= August 1917 =

Month in 1917

<<	August 1917					>>
Su	Mo	Tu	We	Th	Fr	Sa
			1	2	3	4
5	6	7	8	9	10	11
12	13	14	15	16	17	18
19	20	21	22	23	24	25
26	27	28	29	30	31

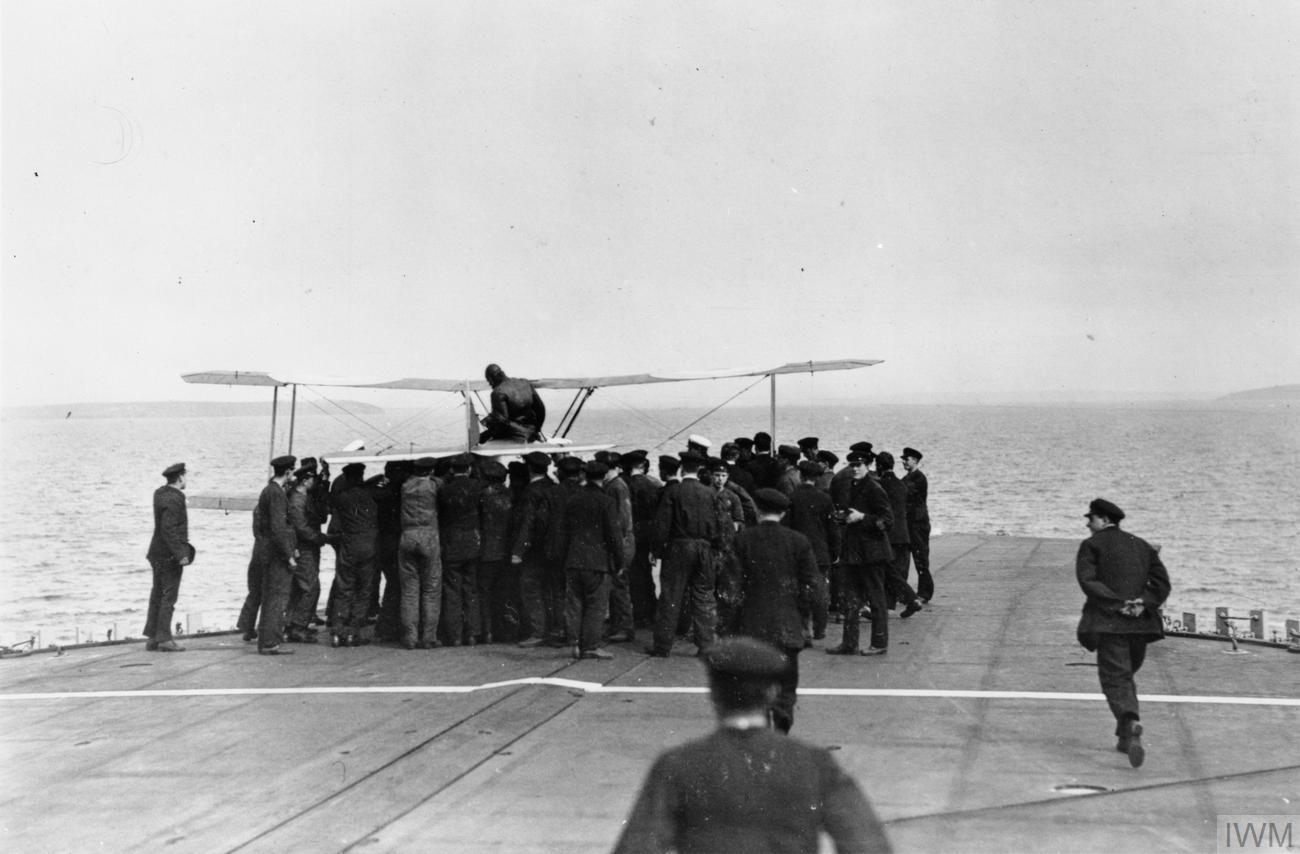
Royal Navy pilot Edwin Harris Dunning being congratulated after landing on HMS Furious in his Sopwith Pup airplane on 2 August 1917.

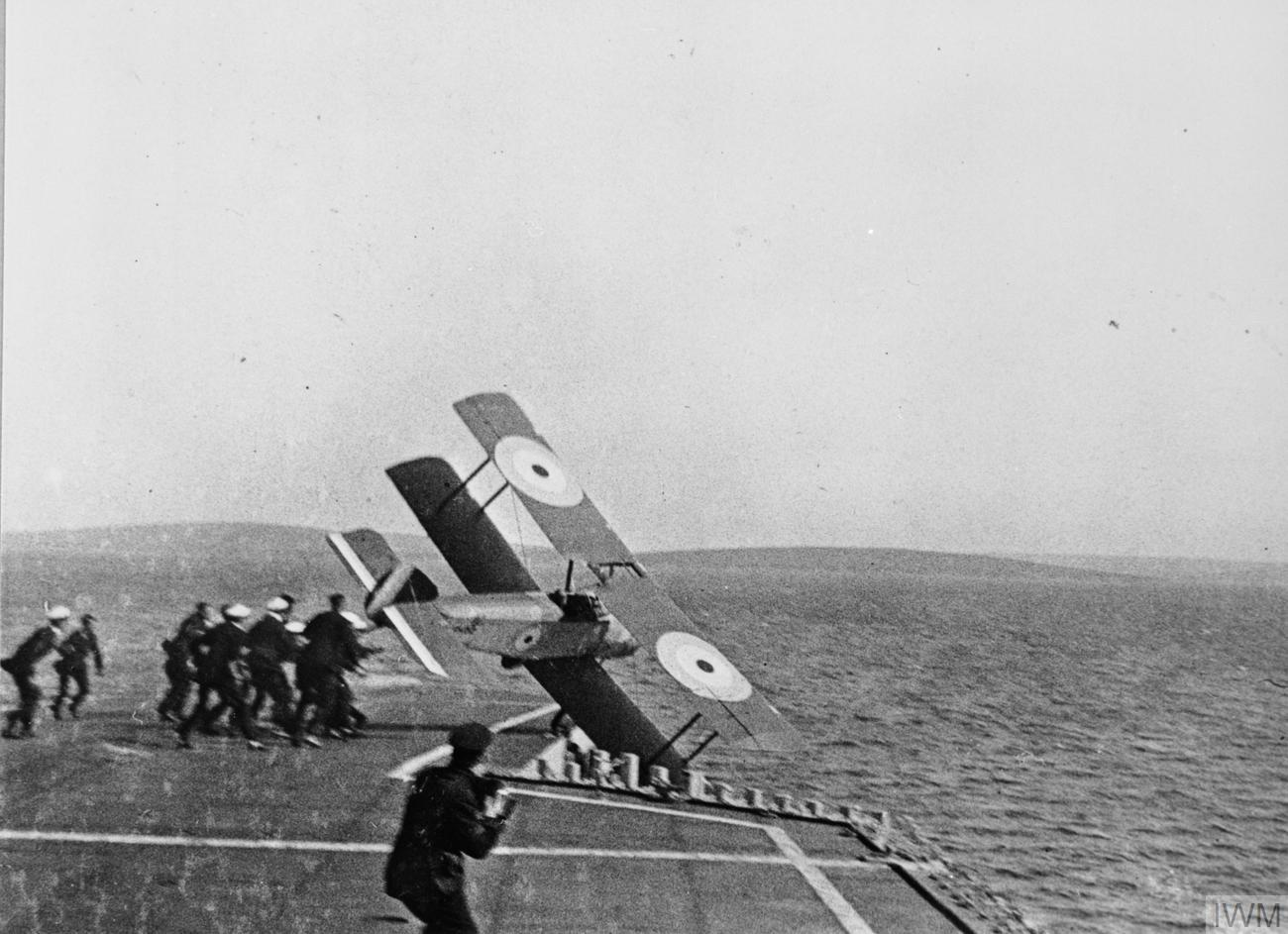
The Sopwith Pup aircraft piloted by Edwin Harris Dunning veers off the flight deck of HMS Furious during his second attempt to land on the carrier, killing him August 7, 1917.

The following events occurred in August 1917:

== August 1, 1917 (Wednesday) ==
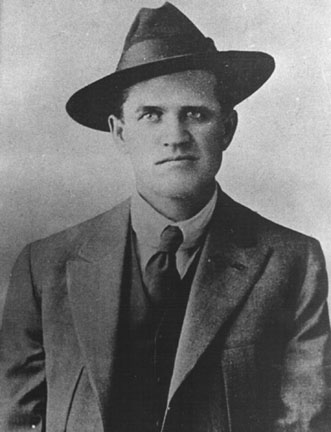
Union leader Frank Little, lynched

- Battle of Mărăști – Russian and Romanian forces broke through a 30 km stretch of German line and advanced 20 km into German held territory in eastern Romania. While the victory did not entirely defeat the German Ninth Army, the Russian-Romanian forces took 2,700 prisoners and 70 guns, and inflicted 9,600 German casualties. The Russian-Romanian force sustained 4,879 casualties.
- Feng Guozhang became President of the Republic of China.
- British hospital ship HMHS Letitia ran aground and sank off Nova Scotia while traveling from Liverpool to Halifax. A single person was killed and the rest of the crew were rescued.
- Japanese navy cruiser Otowa ran aground off Daiō, Mie, Japan and sank ten days later.
- Montana labor leader Frank Little was abducted by six masked men from his room in a boardinghouse, beaten and then dragged by car through the streets of Butte, Montana. His official cause of death was asphyxiation. Little had been in town as representative of the Industrial Workers of the World organization to oversee a miners' strike at Anaconda Copper. His murder was never solved.
- The German Navy Zeppelin L 53 achieved an altitude of 20,700 feet (6,300 meters), a new record for an airship.
- The Royal Flying Corps established air squadrons No. 79, No. 80, No. 85, No. 111, and No. 113.
- The London Underground extended the Bakerloo line with a new tube station at Stonebridge Park.
- Born: Esme Tombleson, Australian-New Zealand politician, Member of New Zealand Parliament from 1960 to 1972; as Esme Irene Lawson, in Sydney, Australia (d. 2010)

== August 2, 1917 (Thursday) ==
- Battle of Pilckem Ridge – Days of constant rain turned the battlefield into mud, making it hard for troops and vehicles to traverse and thus slowing the advance. British casualties by then were recorded at 31,820 casualties while German casualties were 30,000, including 5,626 prisoners captured on the opening day of battle.
- Green Corn Rebellion – Several hundred farmers in central Oklahoma staged an uprising against the World War I draft.
- Italian flying ace Pier Ruggero Piccio scored his eighth victory by shooting down Austro-Hungarian ace Frank Linke-Crawford, who was flying a two-seat aircraft without a rear gunner on board. Linke-Crawford survived uninjured.
- British air naval officer Edwin Harris Dunning successfully landed his aircraft on Royal Navy carrier HMS Furious in the Scapa Flow. However, he died while making a third attempt to land on the same ship five days later.
- The No. 61 Squadron was established by the Royal Flying Corps at Rochford, England.
- Born: Wah Chang, American designer, best known for designing the futuristic props in Star Trek including the tricorder and communicator; in Honolulu, Territory of Hawaii, United States (present-day Hawaii, U.S.) (d. 2003)

== August 3, 1917 (Friday) ==
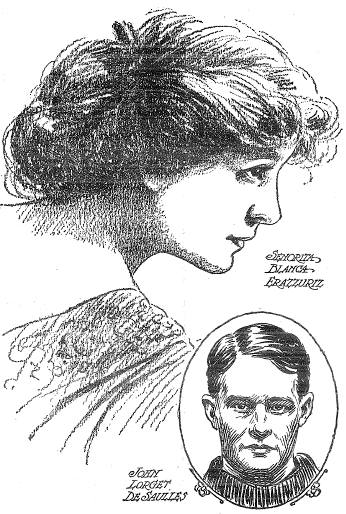
Estranged NYC celebrity couple Blanca Errázuriz and John de Saulles, in happier times (1912)

- Green Corn Rebellion – An armed group of Oklahoma farmers estimated between 800 and 1,000 met up with an armed posse on the Canadian River where shots were exchanged before the group dispersed. Three people were killed over two days of unrest and 450 were arrested. Of that group, 184 were charged and 150 were convicted and sentenced to prison.
- The United States Army established the 1st Medical Brigade at Fort Hood, Texas.
- The state defense force New York Guard was founded as a replacement for the New York National Guard which was drafted for service in World War I.
- American business leader and retired star football player and coach John de Saulles (member of the 1901 College Football All-America Team), was shot by his estranged wife Blanca Errázuriz in front of his home in Westbury, New York. He later died from gunshot wounds in hospital. The two had been going through a high-profile divorce and custody battle over their son that had rising film star Rudolph Valentino involved as a character witness.
- Born: Antonio Lauro, Venezuelan guitarist, considered one of the best live performers of Spanish guitar; in Ciudad Bolívar, Venezuela (d. 1986)
- Died:
  - Ferdinand Georg Frobenius, 67, German mathematician, developed the Frobenius method as a solution for differential equations (b. 1849)
  - John Thomson, 63, Australian politician, member of the Victorian Legislative Assembly 1892–1914 (b. 1853)

== August 4, 1917 (Saturday) ==
- Liberia declared war on Germany.
- German submarine SM UC-44 struck one of her own mines off the coast of Ireland and sank with the loss of all 26 crew on board.
- The United States Army established the 48th Aero Squadron.
- The Edwardian musical comedy The Better 'Ole by Bruce Bairnsfather, with music by Herman Darewski, premiered at Oxford Music Hall in Westminster, London, England, and starring Arthur Bourchier in the title role.
- Born: John Fitch, American racing driver, first American driver to compete in the European racing circuit through the Italian Grand Prix; in Indianapolis, United States (d. 2012)
- Died: Noel Godfrey Chavasse, 32, British army medical officer, two-time recipient of the Victoria Cross; killed in action (b. 1884)

== August 5, 1917 (Sunday) ==
- Battle of Passchendaele – German troops launched a surprise attack against British units near Hollebeke, Belgium, capturing the village (although it was later abandoned).
- The United States Army established the 35th, 82nd, 88th, and 91st Infantry Divisions. As well, the 5th Brigade of the 78th Infantry Division and the 407th Forward Support Battalion were established as part of the American Expeditionary Forces in Europe.

== August 6, 1917 (Monday) ==
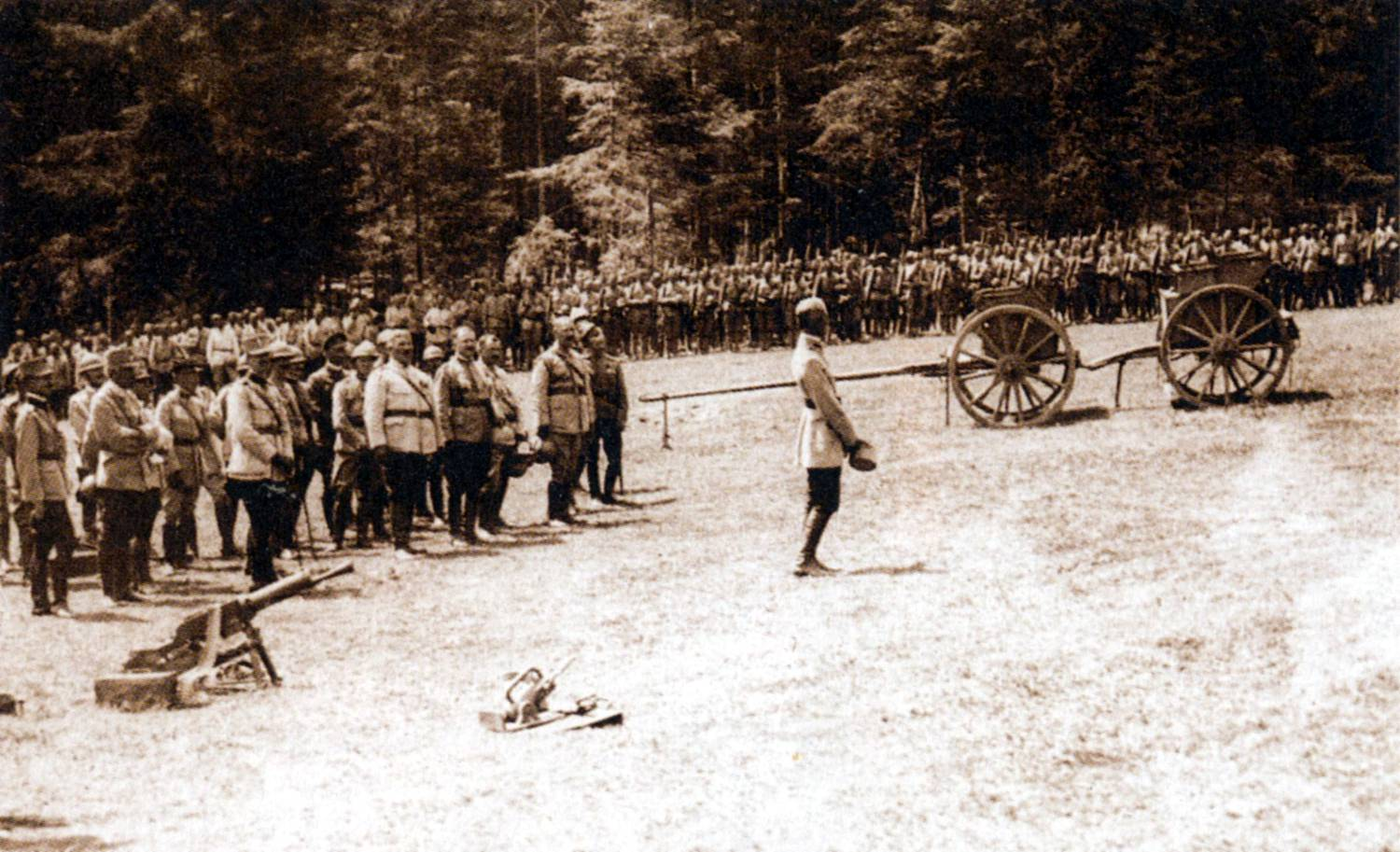
Romanian troops assemble to fight off a German counter-offensive at the Battle of Mărășești.

- Battle of Mărășești – The German Ninth Army, composed of 245,000 troops, launched a counter-offensive against the joint Russian-Romanian force of 218,000 soldiers around the Siret River near Mărășești, Romania, in what was the last major battle between Germany and Romania.
- Railway workers in Sydney officially walked off the job to strike, with eventually over 100,000 industrial workers joining the general strike throughout Australia.
- The United States Army established the 49th and 50th Aero Squadrons.
- Born: Robert Mitchum, American actor, best known for antihero and villainous roles in Out of the Past, The Night of the Hunter, and Cape Fear; in Bridgeport, Connecticut, United States (d. 1997)
- Died: Richard McBride, 46, Canadian politician, 16th Premier of British Columbia (b. 1870)

== August 7, 1917 (Tuesday) ==
- British air naval officer Edwin Harris Dunning died when the Sopwith Pup aircraft he was trying to land for a third time on Royal Navy carrier HMS Furious missed the landing strip and fell over the side.
- Died:
  - Basil Hood, 53, British composer, best known for libretto contributions to comic operas The French Maid, The Rose of Persia, The Emerald Isle and Merrie England (b. 1864)
  - Francis Earl Johnston, 45, New Zealand army officer, commander of the New Zealand 1st Brigade and New Zealand Rifle Brigade; killed in action (b. 1871)

== August 8, 1917 (Wednesday) ==
- Third Battle of Oituz – The Austro-Hungarian First Army attacked defending forces of the Romanian Second Army in the Oituz valley of Romania.
- Royal Navy vessel HMS Dunraven was torpedoed and shelled in the Bay of Biscay by German submarine SM UC-71, killing one crew member. Survivors were rescued by another Royal Navy vessel before Dunraven sank two days later.
- American schooner George A. Marsh sank during a storm in Lake Ontario with the loss of 12 lives, including seven children.
- Born: Earl Cameron, Bermudian-British actor, best known as being the first black actor in lead roles in British cinema and television, including Pool of London, Sapphire and The Interpreter; as Earlston Jewett Cameron, in Pembroke Parish, Bermuda (d. 2020)

== August 9, 1917 (Thursday) ==
- Royal Navy destroyer HMS Recruit was torpedoed and sunk by German submarine SM UB-16 in the North Sea with 54 crew lost.
- The Royal Flying Corps established air squadrons No. 102, No. 194, and No. 197.
- The United States Army established the 55th and 88th Aero Squadrons.
- Died: José Inés Salazar, 32-33, Mexican revolutionary leader; killed in action near Nogales Hacienda, Mexico (b. 1884)

== August 10, 1917 (Friday) ==
- Third Battle of Oituz – After suffering initial setbacks, Romanian forces pushed back against the combined Austro-Hungarian and German assault in the Oituz valley of Romania.
- The British 18th and 25th Divisions captured portions of West Flanders, Belgium, from the Germans that they failed to gain during the Battle of Pilckem Ridge. The 18th suffered 1,291 casualties and the 25th sustained 1,526 casualties.
- A general strike began in Spain but was smashed in three days with 70 left dead, hundreds wounded and 2,000 arrested.
- U.S. President Woodrow Wilson signed the Food and Fuel Control Act into law.
- Convicted Swedish serial killer Hilda Nilsson committed suicide by hanging herself using linen cloth tied to her cell door, without knowing the court had commuted the original death penalty to life imprisonment that same day. She was the last Swedish death penalty prisoner not to be pardoned.
- Born: Jackie Robinson, English football player, inside forward for clubs including Sheffield Wednesday from 1934 to 1949 and the England national football team from 1937 to 1938; as John Allan Robinson, in Shiremoor, England (d. 1972)

== August 11, 1917 (Saturday) ==
- Iskolat, or the executive committee of the Soviet of Workers, Soldiers, and the Landless in Latvia, was established in Riga.
- Born:
  - Vasiľ Biľak, Slovak politician, leader of the Communist Party of Czechoslovakia from 1968 to 1989; in Sáros County, Austria-Hungary (present-day Krajná Bystrá, Slovakia) (d. 2014)
  - Dik Browne, American cartoonist, creator of Hägar the Horrible and Hi and Lois; as Richard Arthur Allan Browne, in New York City, United States (d. 1989)
- Died: Harold Ackroyd, 40, British army officer, recipient for the Victoria Cross; killed in action at the Battle of Passchendaele (b. 1877)

== August 12, 1917 (Sunday) ==
- Battle of Mărășești – The Romanian First Army, with support from Russia, halted an offensive advance from the German Ninth Army.
- German submarine SM U-44 was rammed and sunk in the North Sea by a Royal Navy vessel with the loss of all 44 crew.
- German Gotha bombers attacked the towns of Shoeburyness and Southend in England in the sixth raid of Operation Türkenkreuz ("Turk's Cross"). Along with a previous raid on July 22, the Germans lost a combined five bombers including one that was shot down and four others wrecked in crashes while returning to base.
- The British Desert Column was reorganized as the Desert Mounted Corps under command of General Edmund Allenby.
- The Western drama Golden Rule Kate, starring Louise Glaum and directed by Reginald Barker, was released through the Triangle Film Corporation. Film critics noted the lead role was a departure from the usual "vamp" roles Glaum was cast in; her character ran a saloon and used gun play in scenes often associated with Western star William S. Hart.
- Emperor Charles issued the Wound Medal, the last military decoration ever established in the Austria-Hungary Empire.
- Born:
  - Marjorie Reynolds, American actress, best known for her roles in Holiday Inn, Ministry of Fear, and the 1950s television sitcom The Life of Riley; as Marjorie Goodspeed, in Buhl, Idaho, United States (d. 1997)
  - Ebba Haslund, Norwegian writer, known for works including Det hendte ingenting, Middag hos Molla and Krise i august; in Seattle, United States (d. 2009)
  - E. Robert Kinney, American business executive, CEO of General Mills from 1973 to 1981; as Earl Robert Kinney, in Burnham, Maine, United States (d. 2013)
  - Adolf Burger, Slovak typographer and Holocaust survivor, member of Operation Bernhard, author of The Commando of Counterfeiters which was adapted into the film The Counterfeiters; in Kakaslomnic, Austria-Hungary (present-day Slovakia) (d. 2016)
  - LeRoy Grannis, American photographer, pioneer of "surfphotography"; in Hermosa Beach, California, United States (d. 2011)
  - James Beveridge, Canadian filmmaker, executive producer for the National Film Board of Canada; in Vancouver, Canada (d. 1993)

== August 13, 1917 (Monday) ==
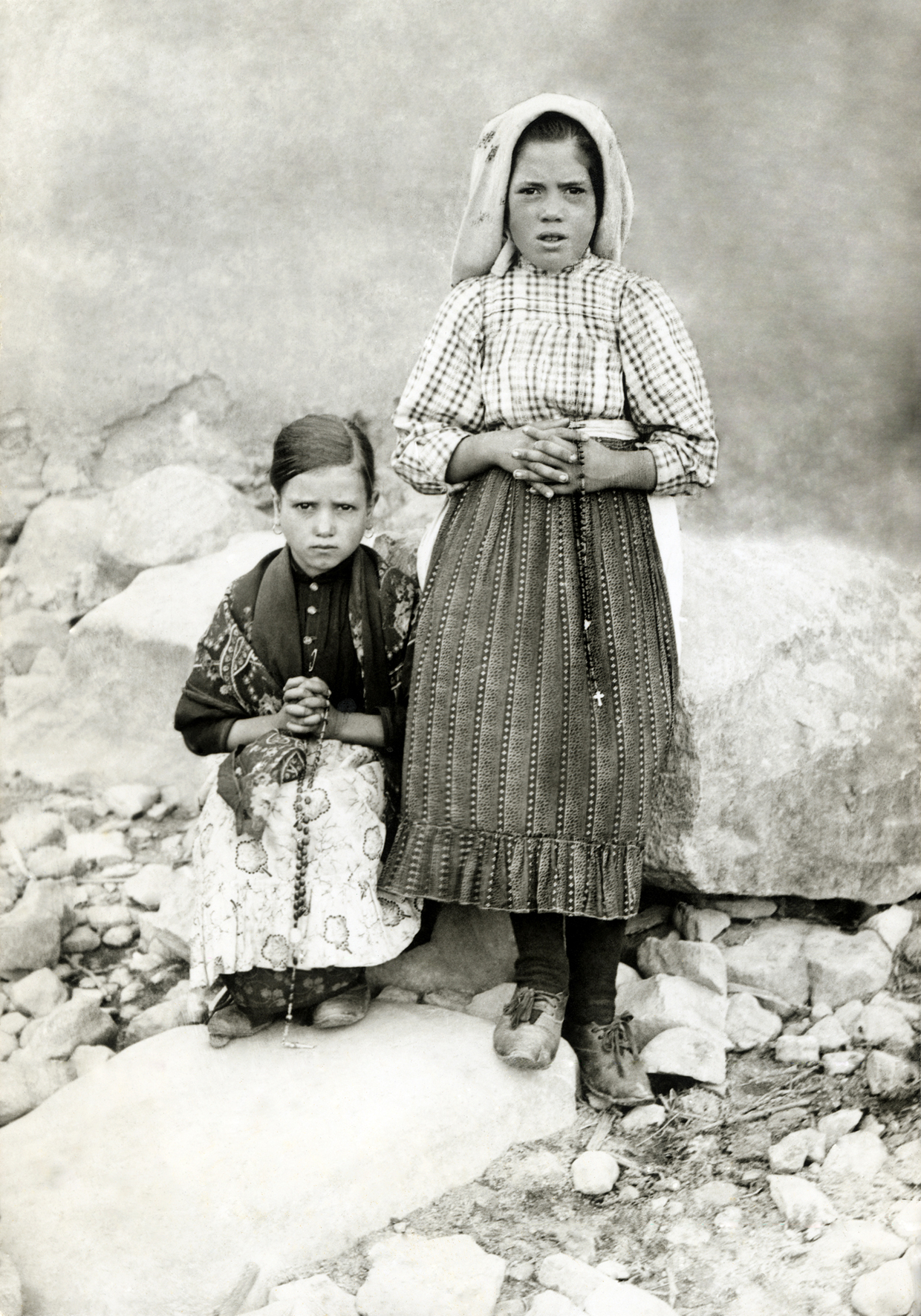
Lúcia Santos with her cousin, Jacinta Marto, receivers of the Our Lady of Fátima visions in Portugal.

- Third Battle of Oituz – Romania and Russia launched counterattacks against Austria-Hungary and Germany but faced losses of up to 800 men.
- Royal Navy ship HMS Bergamot was torpedoed and sunk in the Atlantic Ocean by German submarine SM U-84 with the loss of 14 of her 93 crew.
- Disruptions caused by Catholic pilgrims flocking to the village of Cova da Iria, Portugal to see visions of Our Lady of Fátima forced provincial governor Artur Santos to take custody of initial witnesses Lúcia Santos and her cousins Francisco and Jacinta Marto. The children were interviewed to see if they had made up the story but they defended the visions were real.
- The Stavanger Stadium opened in Stavanger, Norway as the home field for the football club Viking, with a seat capacity of over 17,000, until 2004 when the new Viking Stadium opened.
- Born:
  - Sid Gordon, American baseball player, outfielder and first baseman for the New York Giants, Boston Braves and Pittsburgh Pirates from 1941 to 1955; as Sidney Gordon, in New York City, United States (d. 1975)
  - Richard Hart, Jamaican politician and historian, founding member of the People's National Party, author of Slaves who Abolished Slavery: Blacks in Rebellion; as Ansell Richard Hart, in Montego Bay, Colony of Jamaica, British Empire (present-day Jamaica) (d. 2013)
- Died: Eduard Buchner, 57, German chemist, recipient of the Nobel Prize in Chemistry for his work on fermentation (b. 1860)

== August 14, 1917 (Tuesday) ==
- China declared war on Germany and Austria-Hungary.
- An explosion and fire at a weapons manufacturing plant in Kazan, Russia killed 21 people and injured another 172, including 30 children in the surrounding neighborhoods. Over 500 buildings were destroyed and an estimated 12,000 machine guns and one million shells were lost.
- Royal Navy vessel HMS Prize was torpedoed and sunk in the Atlantic Ocean northwest of Ireland by German submarine SM UB-48 with the loss of all 27 crew, including commanding naval officer and Victoria Cross recipient William Edward Sanders.
- Italian navy vessel SS Umberto I was torpedoed and sunk in the Ligurian Sea by German submarine SM UC-35 with the loss of 26 of her crew.
- The U.S. Marines established the 7th Marine Regiment.
- Born: Marty Glickman, American sports announcer, best known for his live sports commentary for the New York Knicks, New York Giants and the New York Jets; as Martin Irving Glickman, in New York City, United States (d. 2001)
- Died: Miguel Almereyda, 34, French journalist, founder of the news magazines La Guerre sociale and Le Bonnet rouge; died while in police custody (b. 1883)

== August 15, 1917 (Wednesday) ==
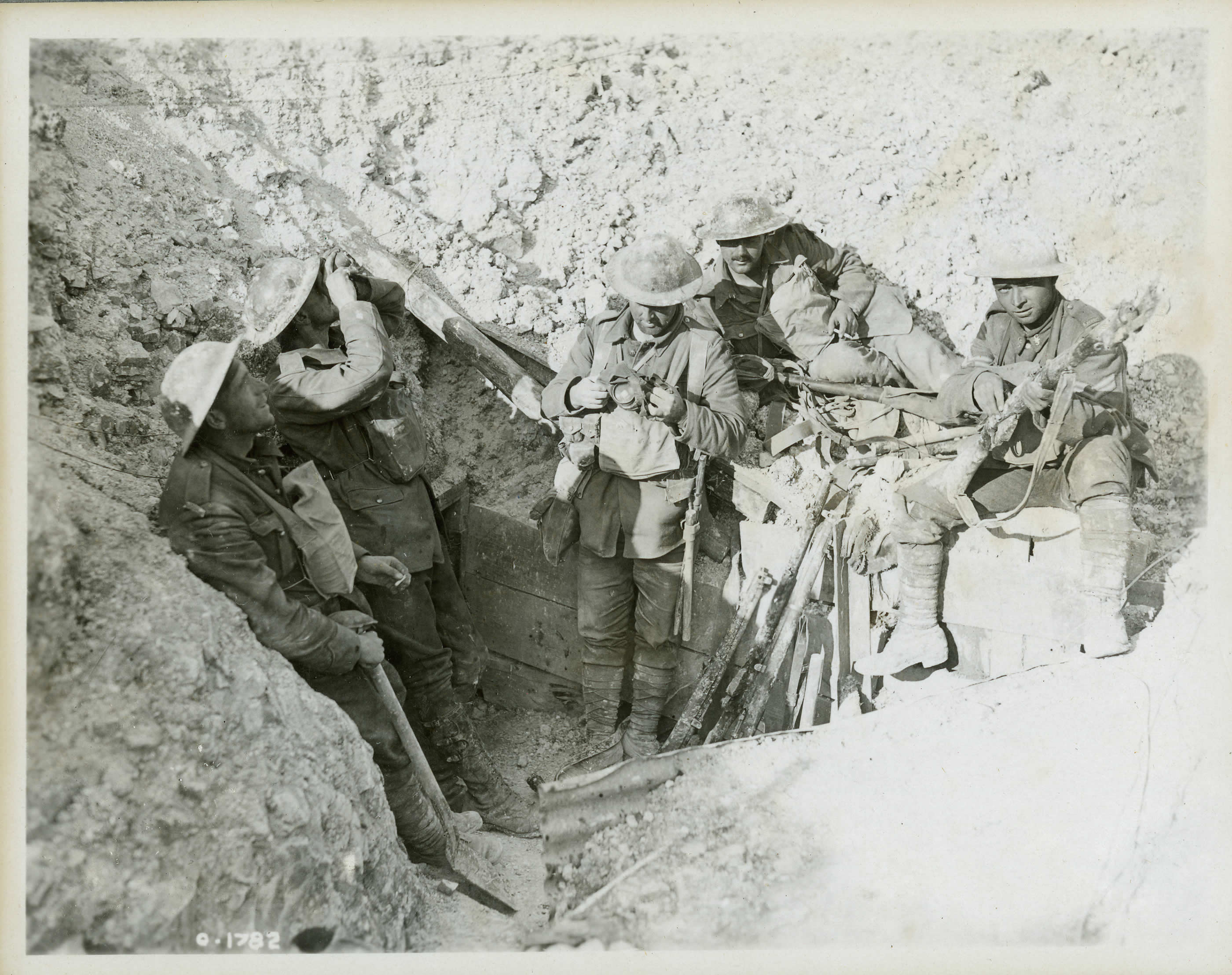
Canadian soldiers in a captured German trench during the Battle of Hill 70.

- Battle of Hill 70 – The Canadian Corps assaulted German positions near Lens, Pas-de-Calais, France to draw enemy units away from the bulk of the British offensive in the Battle of Passchendaele.
- German submarine SM UC-63 attacked and sank British naval trawlers HMT Ethel & Millie and HMT G & E in the North Sea, killing eight sailors.
- The Polish National Committee was formed by Polish nationalist leader Roman Dmowski to support the Allies.
- After two months of study on Allied aircraft in Europe, United States Army aeronautical commission head Colonel Raynal Bolling made recommendations of the materials, engines and parts the United States could provide to the Allied air war effort. He also recommended all top cadets in the U.S. aerial schools be dispatched to France to complete their training to ensure trained American pilots were on hand to support Allied air military campaigns. The U.S. government signed an aeronautical agreement with France by the end of the month.
- Atkinson County, Georgia was established with its county seat in Pearson, Georgia.
- Born:
  - Jack Lynch, Irish state leader, Prime Minister of Ireland from 1966 to 1973 and 1977 to 1979; as John Mary Lynch, in Shandon, Cork, Ireland (d. 1999)
  - Óscar Romero, Salvadoran clergy and activist, Archbishop of San Salvador in El Salvador from 1977 to 1980, beatified by Pope Francis in 2015; in Ciudad Barrios, El Salvador (d. 1980, assassinated)
- Died:
  - John Haynes, 67, Australian journalist, co-founder of The Bulletin (b. 1850)
  - Thomas Crisp, 41, British naval officer, recipient of the Victoria Cross; killed in action (b. 1876)

== August 16, 1917 (Thursday) ==
- Battle of Langemarck – The British Fifth Army and French First Army launched a second attack on the German front line defended by the German Fourth Army near Langemark, Belgium, as part of the Battle of Passchendaele.
- Battle of Hill 70 – Canadian forces captured the entire defensive hill despite a dozen counterattacks by the Germans.
- British ocean liner Delphic was torpedoed and sunk in the Atlantic Ocean by German submarine SM UC-72 with the loss of five lives.
- The all-black 366th Infantry Regiment of the United States Army was established at Camp Dodge, Iowa.
- The Broadway musical Maytime by Rida Johnson Young opened at the Shubert Theatre in New York City, running for a total of 492 performances.
- Atlantic U-boat Campaign – British merchantman SS Athenia was torpedoed and sunk by SM U-53 off the coast of Inishtrahull, Ireland, with the loss of 15 crew and passengers and 440 war horses.

== August 17, 1917 (Friday) ==
- Battle of Hill 70 – Attempts to draw more German forces away from the Ypres salient failed. Many units suffered casualties from German gas attacks, with an estimated 15,000–20,000 shells of Yellow Cross fired into Canadian trenches.
- General Jan Smuts of South Africa released a report recommending that a military air service should be used as "an independent means of war operations" of the British Army and Royal Navy, leading to the creation of the Royal Air Force in 1918.
- The U.S. Marines established the 1st Machine Gun Battalion as part of the 4th Marine Expeditionary Brigade under command of Major Edward B. Cole (it was later renamed the 6th Machine Gun Battalion in January 1918.
- The United States Army established the 85th Aero Squadron at Kelly Field in San Antonio.
- The International Hat Company was established in St. Louis.
- The Original Dixieland Jass Band recorded their second jazz single "Tiger Rag".
- Born: Safa Khulusi, Iraqi writer, author of Islam Our Choice and Abu Nuwas in America; in Baghdad, Ottoman Empire (present-day Iraq) (d. 1995)
- Died: John W. Kern, 67, American politician, U.S. Senator from Indiana from 1911 to 1917 (b. 1849)

== August 18, 1917 (Saturday) ==
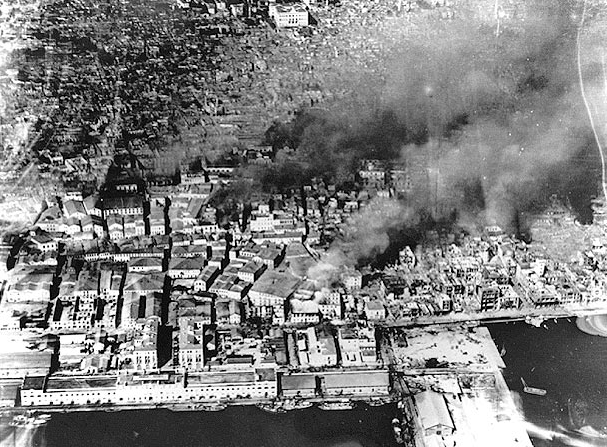
Aerial picture of the massive fire destroying a third of Thessaloniki, Greece.

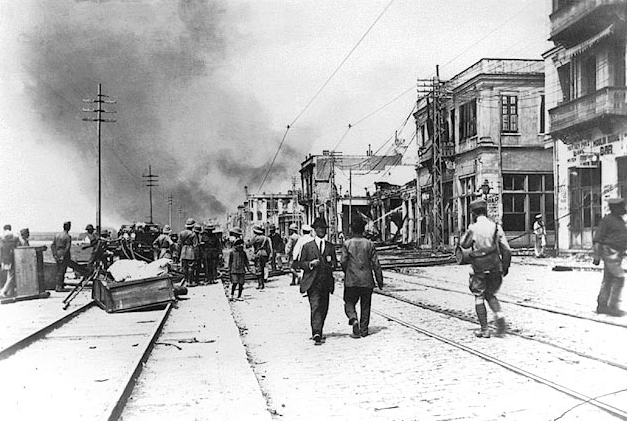
Ground level view of the fire in Thessaloniki, Greece.

- A massive fire destroyed a third of Thessaloniki, Greece, leaving 70,000 people homeless.
- Eleventh Battle of the Isonzo – The Italian Second Army under command of General Luigi Capello launched a major attack on the Austro-Hungarian line along the Isonzo River from Tolmin to the Adriatic Sea coastline in northern Italy, with more than twice the strength of the defending armies.
- Battle of Langemarck – The German Fourth Army was able to hold the lines against the Allied attack but suffered 24,000 casualties, including 2,100 troops taken prisoner along with 30 guns and another 5,000 missing. Both British and French armies suffered 36,190 casualties.
- Vladimir Lenin set up a political bureau, known as the "Narrow composition", with members Leon Trotsky, Grigory Zinoviev, Lev Kamenev, Joseph Stalin, and Grigory Sokolnikov. The bureau laid the foundations for the establishment of the Politburo of the Communist Party of the Soviet Union.
- A total 28 German bombers were launched in the seventh and largest raid of Operation Türkenkreuz on England. However, unfavorable wind conditions hindered travel and forced aircraft to use up so much fuel that the strike commander ordered bombers to abort the raid to ensure most aircraft could return to base. The striking squadron lost two airplanes in the North Sea, another two were forced to crash-land in the Netherlands, and several more were lost in Belgium.
- The United States Army established the 77th Infantry Division.
- The United States Army established the 112th Aero Squadron at Kelly Field, San Antonio.
- English writer Wilfred Owen introduced himself to Siegfried Sassoon while both were staying at the Craiglockhart War Hospital in Edinburgh. Sassoon was sent to the hospital under military orders after he published "Soldier's Declaration", a protest essay against the prolongation of World War I. With Sassoon's encouragement, Owen wrote his two great war poems, "Anthem for Doomed Youth" and "Dulce et Decorum est", although almost all his poetry remained unpublished until after he was killed in action the following year. The meeting was dramatized in both the novel Regeneration by Pat Barker and the play Not About Heroes by Stephen MacDonald.
- Born:
  - Caspar Weinberger, American politician, 15th United States Secretary of Defense; in San Francisco, United States (d. 2006)
  - Zvi Keren, American-Israeli jazz pianist and composer, known for his jazz compositions "Electronic Brain", "Riot in Russia", and "Regards to Igor"; as Howard Ralph Kirshenbaum, in New York City, United States (d. 2008)

== August 19, 1917 (Sunday) ==
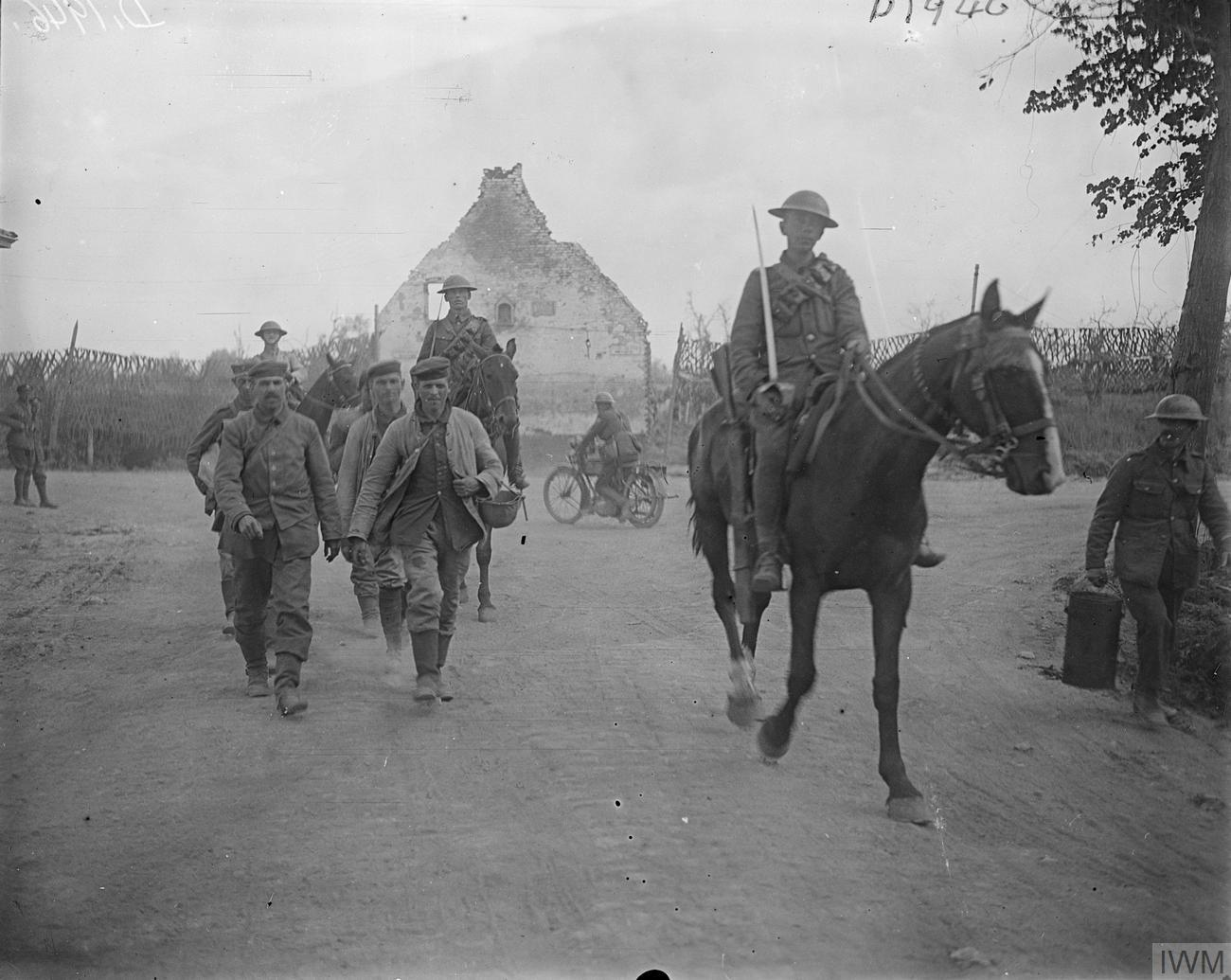
Three cavalrymen escorting a captured machine-gun crew through Brielen, 19 August 1917

- Battle of Mărășești – Romania repelled all attempts for Germany to advance past Siret River.
- Third Battle of Oituz – Austria-Hungary resumed its offensive against Romania
- Battle of Passchendaele – The British 1st Tank Brigade, supported by an infantry corps, attacked and destroyed five German strongholds in West Flanders, Belgium, with minimum casualties.
- Lúcia Santos and her cousins Francisco and Jacinta Marto reported another vision of the Our Lady of Fátima near Valinhos, Portugal and were told "to pray a lot, a lot for the sinners and sacrifice a lot, as many souls perish in hell because nobody is praying or making sacrifices for them."
- Michigan Governor Albert Sleeper established the Michigan State Troops Permanent Force, the precursor to the present-day Michigan State Police.
- The United States Army established the 89th, 92nd and 93rd Aero Squadrons at Kelly Field in San Antonio.
- Born:
  - Laurie Aarons, Australian politician, leader of the Communist Party of Australia from 1965 to 1976; as Laurence Aarons, in Sydney, Australia (d. 2005)
  - Egon Mayer, German air force officer, commander of Jagdgeschwader 2 of the Luftwaffe during World War II, credited with 102 victories, recipient of the Knight's Cross of the Iron Cross; in Konstanz, German Empire (present-day Germany) (d. 1944, killed in action)

== August 20, 1917 (Monday) ==
- Battle of Verdun – France launched an offensive against Germany near Verdun, France.
- Third Battle of Oituz – Austria-Hungary regained lost ground from Romanian counterattacks, nearly ending the battle. Combined casualties for the Austro-Hungarian and German forces were estimated at 1,500 with no official record of Romanian casualties.
- Battle of Mărășești – With no chance of breakthrough, Germany switched to improving its offensive positions for a renewed offensive against Romania.
- Royal Navy ship HMS Vala was sunk in the Atlantic Ocean by German submarine SM UB-54 with the loss of 43 of her crew.
- Royal Navy submarine HMS E47 was lost in the North Sea with all 30 crew including Lieutenant Colin Fraser Creswell, the son of Vice Admiral Sir William Rooke Creswell. The wreck was located in 2002.
- The United States Army established the 94th, 95th, 96th, 97th, and 100th Aero Squadrons at Kelly Field in San Antonio.
- Revolutionary leaders Simeon G. Murafa and Andrei Hodorogea, Russian politicians of Romanian ethnicity, and advocates for the creation of an independent Bessarabia state from the Russian Empire, were murdered by soldiers during a public social gathering at Chișinău (now part of Moldova).
- Several Puerto Rican bankers joined to open Banco de Ponce in Ponce, Puerto Rico.
- Born: Terry Sanford, American politician, 65th Governor of North Carolina; as James Terry Sanford, in Laurinburg, North Carolina, United States (d. 1998)
- Died:
  - Adolf von Baeyer, 81, German chemist, recipient of the Nobel Prize in Chemistry, for synthesizing the color indigo and developing the Von Baeyer nomenclature which is now part of the IUPAC nomenclature of organic chemistry (b. 1835)
  - Jimmy Speirs, 31, Scottish football player, inside forward for various clubs including Bradford and Leeds from 1905 to 1915, and the Scotland national football team in 1908; killed in action at the Battle of Passchendaele (b. 1886)

== August 21, 1917 (Tuesday) ==
- Battle of Hill 70 – German forces began shelling Lens, France, thwarting the Canadian Corps from further action.
- An antiwar uprising broke out in Turin for "peace and bread".
- An internal explosion on German submarine SM UC-41 sank the vessel in River Tay, Scotland, killing all 27 crew and seven British prisoners of war.
- German submarine SM UC-72 went missing on this date with the loss of all 31 crew.
- British cargo liner Oslo was torpedoed and sunk in the North Sea by German submarine SM U-87 with the loss of three of her crew.
- Most of the provisions of Corn Production Act come into force in the United Kingdom, guaranteeing minimum prices for wheat and oats, as well as specifying the minimum wage for agricultural workers.
- Born: Leonid Hurwicz, Polish-American economist, recipient of the Nobel Memorial Prize in Economic Sciences for developing mechanism design for economic systems; in Moscow, Russian Empire (present-day Russia) (d. 2008)

== August 22, 1917 (Wednesday) ==
- Battle of Passchendaele – Infantry and tanks with the British Fifth Army clashed with the German Fourth Army near Langemark, Belgium, in an attempt to capture German defense positions not achieved during the Battle of Langemarck, but were subsequently driven back with a loss of 4,508 casualties.
- The eighth raid of Operation Türkenkreuz involved 15 bombers attacking England during daylight. Five aircraft were forced to turn back over the North Sea, and the remaining 10 encountered British fighter aircraft and heavy anti-aircraft fire over the Isle of Thanet. Two bombers were shot down immediately, and a third was shot down over Dover. The losses prompted the German Air Force to halt daylight raids over the United Kingdom and switch to night bombing.
- Eight German Navy Zeppelins commanded by Naval Airship Service officer Peter Strasser aboard L 46 attempted a high-altitude raid on England, but only reached the British coastline. It bombed the Kingston upon Hull area, destroying a chapel and injuring one civilian.
- Royal Naval Air Service Flight Sub-Lieutenant B. A. Smart launched an attack in a Sopwith Pup fighter from a flying-off platform mounted on a gun turret of the Royal Navy light cruiser HMS Yarmouth, and shot down German Navy Zeppelin L 23 over the North Sea with the loss of her entire crew.
- Born: Blair Clark, American journalist, general manager of CBS News and editor for The Nation in the 1960s; as Ledyard Blair Clark, in East Hampton, New York, United States (d. 2000)

== August 23, 1917 (Thursday) ==
- Houston riot of 1917 – Following a rumor of an African American soldier dying while in police custody, 156 soldiers of the 24th Infantry Regiment mutinied and marched on Houston where they clashed with police officers, resulting in 20 deaths. Courts-martial for the soldiers resulted in 19 being executed and another 41 given life sentences.
- Government troops in Maracaibo, Venezuela raided the news office of Diario El Fonógrafo, effectively shutting down the prominent daily newspaper permanently.
- Born: Tex Williams, American country music singer, known for his talking blues style in country hits "Smoke! Smoke! Smoke! (That Cigarette)" and "Suspicion"; as Sollie Paul Williams, in Ramsey, Illinois, United States (d. 1985)
- Died: Jakob Messikommer, 98, Swiss archaeologist, discovered the Wetzikon-Robenhausen prehistoric dwelling sites in Switzerland (b. 1828)

== August 24, 1917 (Friday) ==
- In the U.S. state of Texas, Governor James E. Ferguson was suspended from office as the state's house of representatives presented its 21 articles of impeachment to the Texas Senate for trial. Lieutenant Governor W. P. Hobby took office under the state's constitution, pending the outcome of the trial.
- In Philadelphia, a meeting of the People's Council of America for Democracy and the Terms of Peace, a pacifist organization opposed to the U.S. participation in World War One, was shut down when a mob of an estimated 1,000 soldiers and sailors invaded the hall where the group was meeting. Similar disruptions followed on August 28 in Fargo, North Dakota and on August 30 in Hudson, Wisconsin.
- Born:
  - Dennis James, American television personality, host of television game shows Cash and Carry and The Price Is Right; as Demie James Sposa, in Jersey City, New Jersey, United States (d. 1997)
  - Ruth Park, New Zealand children's author, author of The Harp in the South and Playing Beatie Bow, and the popular radio and books series of The Muddle-Headed Wombat; as Rosina Ruth Lucia Park, in Auckland, New Zealand (d. 2010)
- Died: Alfred Kidd, 68, New Zealand politician, 18th Mayor of Auckland (b. 1851)

== August 25, 1917 (Saturday) ==
- Battle of Hill 70 – The Germans frustrated further attempts by the Canadian Corps to draw further forces to Lens, France. The Canadians suffered 9,198 casualties but managed to inflict up to 25,000 German casualties, including 1,369 German prisoners. Six Victoria Crosses were also awarded, to Harry W. Brown, Robert Hill Hanna, Frederick Hobson, Okill Massey Learmonth, Michael James O'Rourke, and Filip Konowal, the only Ukrainian ever to receive the medal citation.
- British passenger ship SS Malda was torpedoed and sunk in the Atlantic Ocean by German submarine SM U-70, killing 64 people.
- The United States Army established the 34th, 37th, 38th, 42nd, 83rd, 84th, 85th, 86th, 87th, and 90th Infantry Divisions.
- American tennis player Robert Lindley Murray defeated Nathaniel Niles in four sets to win the U.S. National Men's Singles Championship.
- Born:
  - Mel Ferrer, American actor and director, known for his roles in Lili and War and Peace; as Melchor Gastón Ferrer, in Elberon, New Jersey, United States (d. 2008)
  - J. L. Mackie, Australian philosopher, best known for his contribution to the discussion of ethics, author of Ethics: Inventing Right and Wrong; as John Leslie Mackie, in Sydney, Australia (d. 1981)
  - Lou van Burg, Dutch television game show host, best known for his game show Der goldene Schuss ("The Golden Shot"); as Louis van Weerdenburg, in The Hague, Netherlands (d. 1986)

== August 26, 1917 (Sunday) ==
- Battle of Verdun – France achieved a costly advance into German territory around Verdun at a cost of 14,000 casualties including 4,470 killed, while capturing some 11,000 German prisoners.
- The 106th Aero Squadron was established at Kelly Field, Texas.
- Born:
  - William H. Bates, American politician, U.S. Representative from Massachusetts from 1950 to 1969; in Salem, Massachusetts, United States (d. 1969)
  - William French Smith, American politician, 74th United States Attorney General; in Wilton, New Hampshire, United States (d. 1990)
  - Eileen Caddy, British spiritual leader, founded with husband Peter Caddy the Findhorn Foundation in Scotland; in Alexandria, Sultanate of Egypt (present-day Egypt) (d. 2006)
  - Jan Clayton, American actress, best known for the role of Ellen Miller in the TV series Lassie; in Tularosa, New Mexico, United States (d. 1983)
- Died: William Lane, 55, Australian activist, founder of New Australia colony in Paraguay (b. 1861)

== August 27, 1917 (Monday) ==
- The United States Army established the 76th, 78th, 79th, and 89th Infantry Divisions.
- The United States Army established the 105th and 107th Aero Squadrons at Kelly Field, San Antonio.
- The war drama The Little American, directed by Cecil B. DeMille, was released with Mary Pickford in the starring role. It became her third hit of the year and eighth top-grossing film of 1917. A print of the film is with the UCLA Film and Television Archive.
- Film western Straight Shooting was released starring Harry Carey. It is one of the oldest surviving films directed by John Ford and is preserved at the George Eastman Museum in Rochester, New York.

== August 28, 1917 (Tuesday) ==
- U.S. President Wilson rejected a proposal by Pope Benedict XV to end war between the Allied Expeditionary Force and the Central Powers, sending a communique to the Pope by way of Secretary of State Lansing. Wilson's message said, in part, "Every heart that has not been blinded and hardened by theis terrible war must be touched by this moving appeal of his holiness the Pope... But it would be folly to take it if it does not in fact lead to the goal he proposes." Wilson added, "The object of this war is to deliver the free peoples of the world from the menace and actual power of a vast military establishment controlled by an irresponsible government which, having secretly planned to dominate the world, proceeded to carry the plan out without regard either to the sacred obligations of treaty or the long-established practices and long-cherished principles of international actiona and honor.
- Born: Jack Kirby, American comic book artist, created with Joe Simon the comic superhero Captain America, and with Stan Lee the Fantastic Four, the Hulk, Thor, Iron Man, X-Men and the Black Panther; as Jacob Kurtzberg, in New York City, United States (d. 1994)
- Died: Calistrat Hogaș, 69, Romanian writer, established the Romanian literary magazine Viața Românească (b. 1848)

== August 29, 1917 (Wednesday) ==
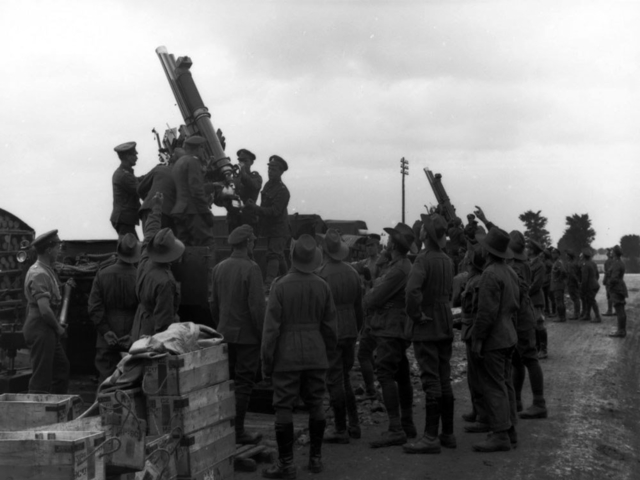
British anti-aircraft gun at Morbecque, Belgium 29 August 1917

- The Military Service Act was passed in the House of Commons of Canada, giving the Government of Canada the right to conscript men into the army.
- The United States Army established the 1st, 2nd, and 3rd Brigade Combat Teams of the 1st Cavalry Division.
- Born:
  - Isabel Sanford, American actress, best known for her lead role in TV sitcom The Jeffersons, recipient of the Primetime Emmy Awards; as Eloise Gwendolyn Sanford, in New York City, United States (d. 2004)
  - John King, British business executive, CEO of British Airways from 1981 to 1989; in Brentford, England (d. 2005)
- Died:
  - Albert Grey, 65, British noble, 9th Governor General of Canada (b. 1851)
  - George Huntington Hartford, 83, American business executive, president of The Great Atlantic & Pacific Tea Company from 1878 to 1917 (b. 1833)

== August 30, 1917 (Thursday) ==
- Battle of Mărășești – After more than three weeks of fighting, Germany only managed to achieve a 2–6 km-deep and 18–20 km-wide breakthrough in the Romanian line.
- The No. 98 Squadron of the Royal Flying Corps was established at Harlaxton, Lincolnshire, England.
- The 70th, 79th, and 638th Aero Squadrons were established at Kelly Field in San Antonio.
- The United States Army established the 332nd Infantry Regiment.
- The first test flight of the Beardmore aircraft was conducted.
- Born:
  - Denis Healey, British politician, Secretary of State for Defence from 1964 to 1970, and Chancellor of the Exchequer from 1974 to 1979; in Mottingham, England (d. 2015)
  - Dan Enright, American television producer, co-creator with Jack Barry of the game show Twenty-One which was scandalized for rigging in the 1950s; as Daniel Ehrenreich, in New York City, United States (d. 1992)
  - Vladimir Kirillovich, Russian noble, claimant to the House of Romanov from 1938 to 1992; in Porvoo, Grand Duchy of Finland, Russian Empire (present-day Finland) (d. 1992)
- Died: Alan Leo, 57, British astrologer, considered the "father of modern astrology" (b. 1860)

== August 31, 1917 (Friday) ==
- The United States gave de jure recognition to the Mexican government under Venustiano Carranza after he assured Mexico would remain neutral during World War I.
- The 103rd Aero Squadron was established at Kelly Field, Texas.
- Born: Len Townsend, English football player, inside right for various clubs including Bristol from 1935 to 1952 and the Irish League representative team in 1943, manager of Maidenhead United from 1954 to 1958 and 1964 to 1969; as Leonard Francis Townsend, in Brentford, England (d. 1997)
