= Penelope Mackie =

British philosopher

Penelope Mackie (1953–2022) (/ˈmæki/) was a British philosopher who specialised in metaphysics and philosophical logic, best known for her work on essence and modality. Mackie spent the majority of her career in the Department of Philosophy at the University of Nottingham (2004–22), having also held appointments at the University of Birmingham, Virginia Commonwealth University, and New College, Oxford.

== Life and career ==
Mackie was the daughter of Australian philosopher J. L. Mackie. She was educated at Somerville College, Oxford, matriculating in 1971, where she completed in her BPhil in Philosophy (thesis title: 'Identity and Continuity') in 1978. Her DPhil was awarded in 1987 for the thesis, How Things Might Have Been: A Study in Essentialism.

Mackie worked in the Department of Philosophy at the University of Nottingham from 2004 until her death in 2022. She was the head of department from 2007 to 2010. Mackie was also a lecturer at the University of Birmingham (1994–2004); a fixed-term fellow at New College, Oxford (1990–1994); assistant professor of philosophy at Virginia Commonwealth University (1987–1990); a visiting lecturer at the University of Maryland (1986–1987); and a lecturer at various Oxford colleges.

== Selected works ==
=== Book ===
How Things Might Have Been (Oxford University Press, 2006)

- Reviewed by André Gallois in The Philosophical Quarterly. https://doi.org/10.1111/j.1467-9213.2007.486_2.x
- Reviewed by E.J. Lowe in Mind. https://doi.org/10.1093/mind/fzm762
- Reviewed by Sonia Roca-Royes in The Philosophical Review. https://doi.org/10.1215/00318108-2008-052

=== Articles ===
Sortals, Timelessness, and Transcendental Truth. Aristotelian Society Supplementary Volume 95 (2021)

Can Metaphysical Modality Be Based on Essence? In: Metaphysics, Meaning, and Modality: Themes from Kit Fine (2020)

Property Dualism and Substance Dualism. Proceedings of the Aristotelian Society 111 (2011)

Fatalism, Incompatibilism, and the Power to Do Otherwise. Noûs 37 (2003)

Identity, Time, and Necessity. Proceedings of the Aristotelian Society 98 (1998)

Sortal Concepts and Essential Properties. The Philosophical Quarterly 44 (1994)

Causing, Delaying, and Hastening: Do Rains Cause Fires? Mind 101 (1992)

Essence, Origin and Bare Identity. Mind 96 (1987)
