= Ethics: Inventing Right and Wrong =

1977 book by J. L. Mackie about ethics

- First edition
- Author: J. L. Mackie
- Language: English
- Subject: Philosophy
- Genre: Non-fiction
- Publisher: Penguin Books

Ethics: Inventing Right and Wrong is a 1977 work of ethics by J. L. Mackie known for its espousal of moral skepticism and the argument from queerness.

== Contents ==
The first chapter, "The Subjectivity of Values," opens with Mackie's rejection of moral universalism: "There are no objective values." This chapter is well known for advancing two arguments against moral universalism: the argument from disagreement and the argument from queerness. The chapter is excerpted in the fourth (2007) edition of Stuart and James Rachels's The Right Thing to Do: Basic Readings in Moral Philosophy.

=== Argument from disagreement ===
The argument from disagreement, also known as the argument from relativity, first observes that there is a lot of intractable moral disagreement: people disagree about what is right and what is wrong. Mackie argues that the best explanation of this is that right and wrong are invented, not objective truths.

=== Argument from queerness ===
The argument from queerness has two forms: metaphysical and epistemological. With regards to the metaphysical version, if moral properties or entities were to exist, they would be very unusual ("queer") things. Epistemologically, it is unclear how we could come to know about such entities. The metaphysical and epistemological arguments are tied together, "since we are forced to posit weird epistemological equipment only if it has already been established that the properties in question are weird.". Quantum phenomena have been put forward as providing counterexamples to both of Mackie's arguments from queerness.

== Literature ==
- McDowell, John: "Aesthetic Value, Objectivity and the Fabric of the World," in: Mind, Value and Reality (1998), Harvard University Press.
