= Krajná Bystrá =

Village in Slovakia

- Municipality
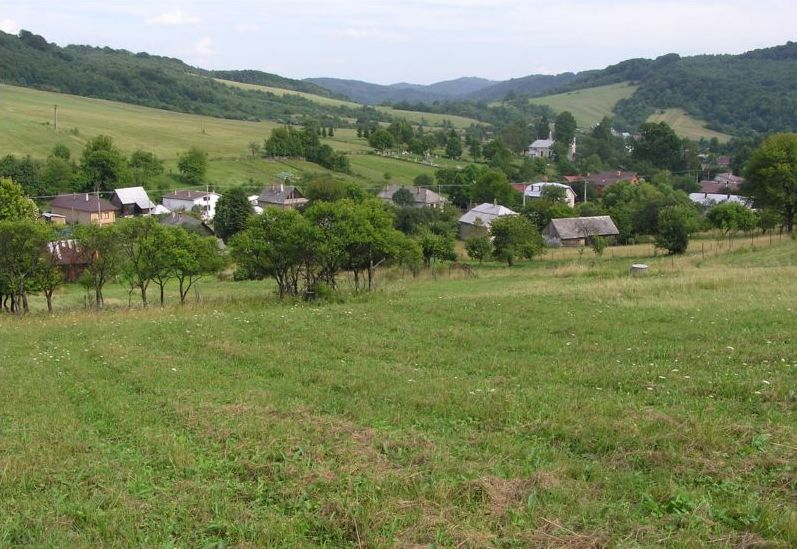

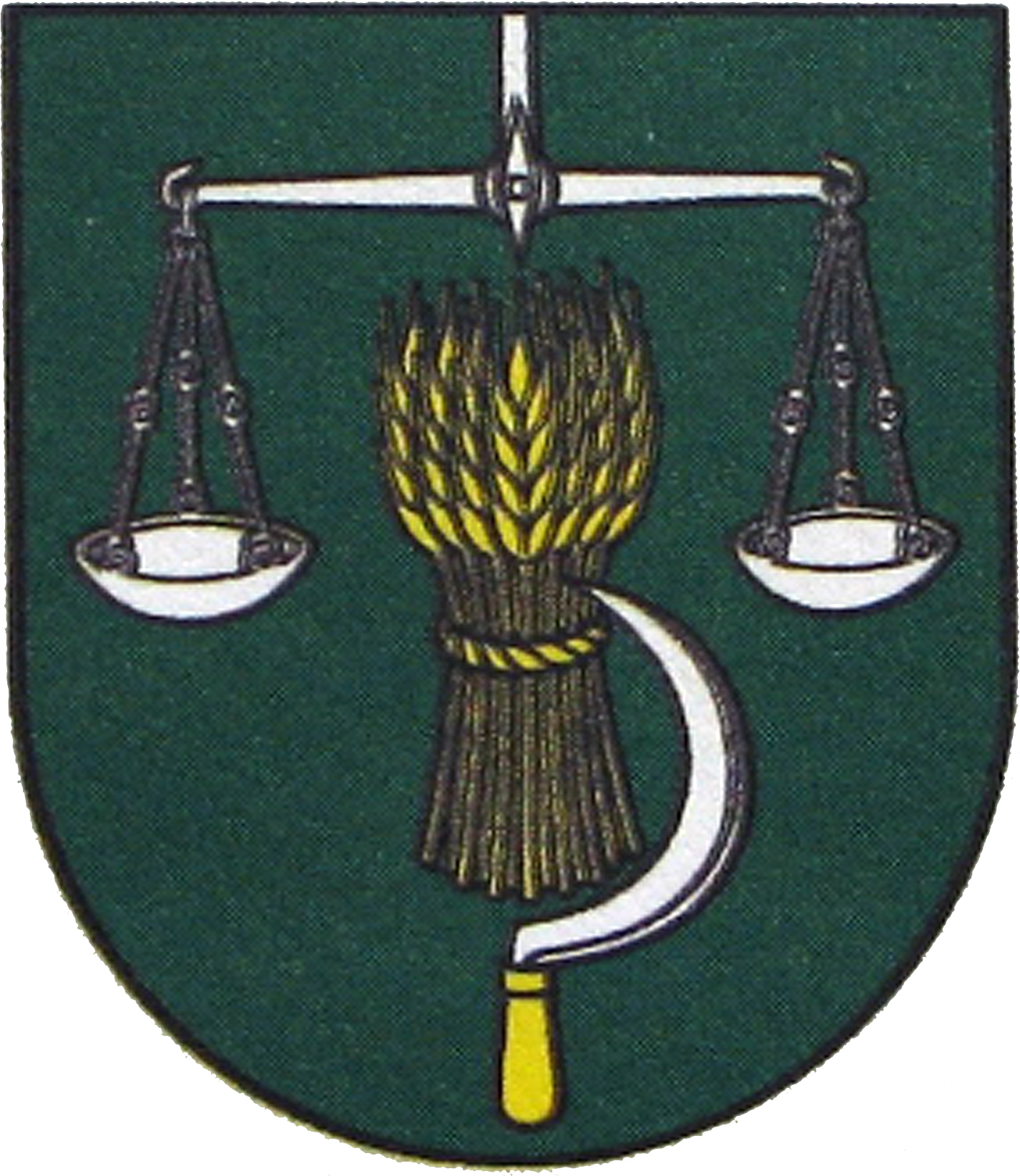
- Flag Coat of arms

- Location of Krajná Bystrá in the Prešov Region Location of Krajná Bystrá in Slovakia
- Coordinates: 49.38°N 21.68°E
- Country: Slovakia
- Region: Prešov Region
- District: Svidník District
- First mentioned: 1618

Area
  - Total: 8.94 km^{2} (3.45 sq mi)
- Elevation: 363 m (1,191 ft)

Population (2025)
  - Total: 501
- Time zone: UTC+1 (CET)
  - Summer (DST): UTC+2 (CEST)
- Postal code: 900 5
- Area code: +421 54
- Vehicle registration plate (until 2022): SK
- Website: www.krajnabystra.sk

Krajná Bystrá (Rusyn: Крайня Быстра; Hungarian: Bátorhegy, until 1899: Krajnó-Bisztra) is a village and municipality in Svidník District in the Prešov Region of north-eastern Slovakia.

== History ==
In historical records the village was first mentioned in 1618.

== Geography ==
The municipality lies at an altitude of 363 metres (1,191 ft) and covers an area of 8.94 km^{2} (3.45 sq mi) (2025).

== Population ==
Population statistic (10 years)
Year	1995	2005	2015	2025
Count	320	331	421	501
Difference		+3.43%	+27.19%	+19.00%

Population statistic
Year	2024	2025
Count	502	501
Difference		−0.19%

It has a population of 501 people (31 December 2025).

=== Ethnicity ===
Census 2021 (1+ %)
Ethnicity	Number	Fraction
Slovak	401	84.59%
Romani	228	48.1%
Rusyn	131	27.63%
Not found out	15	3.16%
Czech	7	1.47%
Total	474	

In year 2021 was 474 people by ethnicity 401 as Slovak, 228 as Romani, 131 as Rusyn, 15 as Not found out, 7 as Czech, 1 as Ukrainian and 1 as Other.

Note on population: The difference values of population numbers in the table "Population statistic" and in the sections "Ethnicity" & "Religion" is caused by the use of various statistical methods.

=== Religion ===
Census 2021 (1+ %)
Religion	Number	Fraction
Greek Catholic Church	413	87.13%
Roman Catholic Church	22	4.64%
Eastern Orthodox Church	16	3.38%
Not found out	11	2.32%
None	9	1.9%
Total	474	

In year 2021 was 474 people by religion 413 from Greek Catholic Church, 22 from Roman Catholic Church, 16 from Eastern Orthodox Church, 11 from Not found out, 9 from None, 2 from United Methodist Church and 1 from Evangelical Church.

== Genealogical resources ==
The records for genealogical research are available at the state archive "Statny Archiv in Presov, Slovakia"

- Greek Catholic church records (births/marriages/deaths): 1862-1895 (parish A)

== See also ==
- List of municipalities and towns in Slovakia
