= J. L. Mackie =

Australian philosopher (1917–1981)

J. L. Mackie FBA
- Born: John Leslie Mackie; 25 August 1917; Sydney, New South Wales, Australia
- Died: 12 December 1981 (aged 64); Oxford, England
- Spouse: Joan Meredith (m. 1947)
- Children: Penelope Mackie

Education
- Education: University of Sydney; Oriel College, Oxford
- Academic advisor: John Anderson

Philosophical work
- Era: 20th-century philosophy
- Region: Western philosophy
- School: Analytic philosophy; Australian realism
- Institutions: University of Otago; University of Sydney; University of York; University College, Oxford
- Notable students: Graeme Forbes
- Main interests: Metaphysics; philosophy of language; ethics; philosophy of religion
- Notable ideas: Argument from queerness

John Leslie Mackie (25 August 1917 – 12 December 1981) was an Australian philosopher. He made significant contributions to ethics, the philosophy of religion, metaphysics, and the philosophy of language. Mackie had influential views on metaethics, including his defence of moral scepticism and his sophisticated defence of atheism. He wrote six books. His most widely known, Ethics: Inventing Right and Wrong (1977), opens by stating, "There are no objective values." It goes on to argue that because of this, ethics must be invented rather than discovered.

His posthumously published The Miracle of Theism: Arguments For and Against the Existence of God (1982) has been called a tour de force in contemporary analytic philosophy. The atheist philosopher Kai Nielsen described it as "one of the most, probably the most, distinguished articulation of an atheistic point of view given in the twentieth century." In 1980, Time magazine described him as "perhaps the ablest of today's atheistic philosophers".

== Life ==
Mackie was born 25 August 1917 in Killara, Sydney, son of Alexander Mackie, professor of education at the University of Sydney and principal of the Sydney Teachers College, influential in the educational system of New South Wales, and Annie Burnett (née Duncan), who was a schoolteacher. In his youth Mackie went to Knox Grammar School in Sydney and graduated with dux.

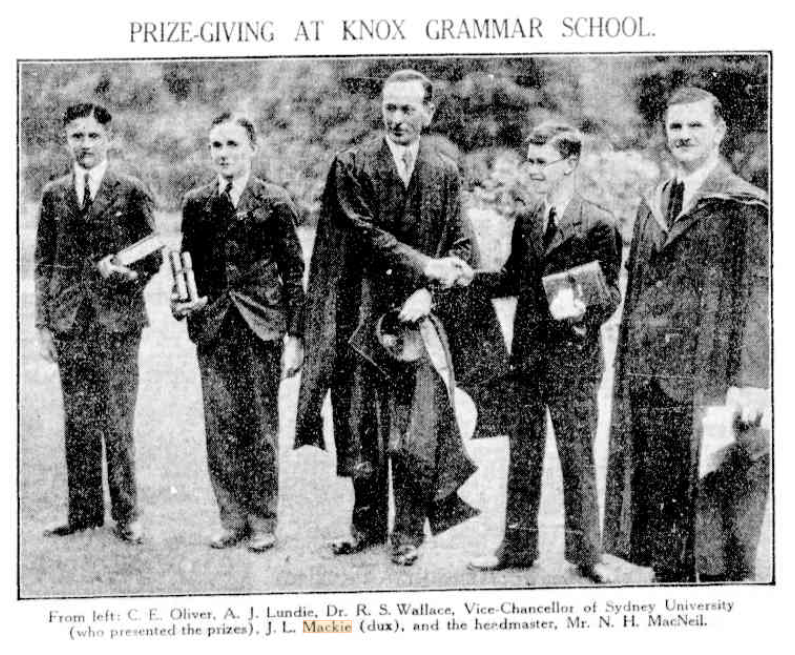
J. L. Mackie receives his Dux from Knox Grammar School

Mackie graduated from the University of Sydney in 1938 after studying under John Anderson, sharing the medal in philosophy with Harold Glass. Mackie received the Wentworth Travelling Fellowship to study greats at Oriel College, Oxford, where he graduated with first-class honours in 1940.

During the Second World War Mackie served with the Royal Electrical and Mechanical Engineers in the Middle East and Italy, and was mentioned in dispatches. He was professor of philosophy at the University of Otago in New Zealand from 1955 to 1959 and succeeded Anderson as the Challis Professor of philosophy at the University of Sydney from 1959 to 1963. In 1963, he moved to the United Kingdom, becoming the inaugural holder of the chair of philosophy in the University of York, a position he held until 1967, when he was elected a fellow of University College, Oxford, where he served as praelector. In 1969, he gave a lecture, "What's Really Wrong with Phenomenalism?", at the British Academy as part of its annual Philosophical Lectures series. In 1974, he became a fellow of the British Academy.

Mackie died in Oxford on 12 December 1981.

=== Character and family ===
Mackie is said to have been capable of expressing total disagreement in such a genial way that the person being addressed might mistake his comment for a compliment. This personal style is exemplified by the following words from the preface to Ethics: Inventing Right and Wrong:

I am nowhere mainly concerned to refute any individual writer. I believe that all those to whom I have referred, even those with whom I disagree most strongly, have contributed significantly to our understanding of ethics: where I have quoted their actual words, it is because they have presented views or arguments more clearly or more forcefully than I could put them myself.

Mackie married Joan Meredith in 1947. One of their three children, Penelope Mackie, also became a philosopher. She lectured in philosophy at the University of Birmingham from 1994 to 2004, and then at the University of Nottingham from 2004 until her death in 2022. Mackie's son David is also a philosopher and graduated from Oxford University, where he held lectureships at Exeter College, Corpus Christi College, and Christ Church before being appointed a Fellow and Tutor at Oriel College. He is Head of Philosophy at D'Overbroeck's College, Oxford. His daughter Hilary is a classicist at Rice University.

== Philosophical work ==
Mackie is best known for his contributions to metaethics, philosophy of religion, and metaphysics.

In his work The Cement of the Universe: A Study of Causation, Mackie makes an analysis of causality by prior philosophers and sets forth his theory of causality based on counterfactual conditionals. He argued that a cause is an "INUS condition" (insufficient but non-redundant parts of a condition which is itself unnecessary but sufficient for the occurrence of the effect). E.g, the statement "The short circuit caused the fire", the short circuit is a necessary part of the fire condition (short circuit and flammable material) but not sufficient (a short circuit does not always result in a fire). This condition in turn is sufficient for a fire to take place, although not necessary (it can be replaced by other conditions such as "lightning and flammable material" or "arson").

In metaethics, he took a position called moral scepticism, arguing against the objective existence of right and wrong as intrinsically normative entities on fundamental grounds. He was unsure what kinds of thing they would be if they existed.

His most widely known work, Ethics: Inventing Right and Wrong, bluntly begins with the sentence "There are no objective values". He uses several arguments to support this claim. He argues that some aspects of moral thought are relative, and that objective morals require an absurd intrinsic action-guiding feature. Most of all, he thinks it is very unclear how objective values could supervene on features of the natural world (see the Argument from queerness), and argues it would be difficult to justify our knowledge of "value entities" or account for any links or consequences they would have. Finally, he thinks it possible to show that even without any objective values, people would still have reason to firmly believe in them (hence he claims that it is possible for people to be mistaken or fooled into believing that objective values exist). The Times called the book "a lucid discussion of moral theory which, although aimed at the general reader, has attracted a good deal of professional attention."

Mackie held compatibilism about free will.

Concerning religion, he was well known for vigorously defending atheism, and also arguing that the problem of evil made untenable the main monotheistic religions. His criticisms of the free will theodicy are particularly significant. He argued that the idea of human free will is no defence for those who wish to believe in an omnipotent being in the face of evil and suffering, as such a being could have given us both free will and moral perfection, thus resulting in us choosing the good in every situation. In 1955 he published "Evil and Omnipotence", which summarized his view that belief in the existence of evil and an all-powerful, all-knowing and all-good god is "positively irrational".

Mackie's views on this logical problem of evil prompted Alvin Plantinga to respond with the "free-will defense", which Mackie later responded in his The Miracle of Theism. In metaphysics, Mackie made significant contributions relating to the nature of causal relationships, especially conditional statements describing them and the notion of an INUS condition.

After being given a copy of Richard Dawkins's The Selfish Gene as a Christmas present, in 1978 Mackie wrote an article in the journal Philosophy praising the book and discussing how its ideas might be applied to moral philosophy. The philosopher Mary Midgley responded in 1979 with "Gene-Juggling", an article arguing that The Selfish Gene was about psychological egoism rather than evolution. This started a dispute between Mackie, Midgley, and Dawkins that was ongoing at the time of Mackie's death.

== Publications ==
=== Books ===
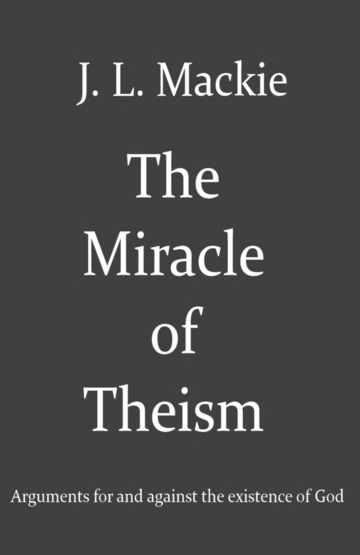
The Miracle of Theism (1982).

- Truth, Probability, and Paradox (1973), Oxford University Press, ISBN 0-19-824402-9.
- The Cement of the Universe: A Study of Causation (1980), Oxford University Press, ISBN 0-19-824642-0.
- Problems from Locke (1976), Oxford University Press, ISBN 0-19-824555-6.
- Ethics: Inventing Right and Wrong (1977), Viking Press, ISBN 0-14-013558-8.
- Hume's Moral Theory (1980), Routledge Keegan & Paul, ISBN 0-7100-0525-3.
- The Miracle of Theism: Arguments for and against the Existence of God (1982), Oxford University Press, ISBN 0-19-824682-X.
- Theories of Justice and Rights (2025), Oxford University Press, ISBN 978-0-19-891740-3.

=== Anthologies ===
- Logic and Knowledge: Selected Papers, Volume I (1985), Oxford University Press, ISBN 0-19-824679-X.
- Persons and Values: Selected Papers, Volume II (1985), Oxford University Press, ISBN 0-19-824678-1.

=== Papers/book chapters ===
- "What’s Really Wrong with Phenomenalism?" Proceedings of the British Academy 55, 1969 (1971)

For a more complete list of works see "The publications of J. L. Mackie" compiled by Joan Mackie.
