= SS Malda (1913) =

British passenger ship (1913–1917)

History

United Kingdom
- Name: Malda
- Namesake: Malda
- Owner: British India SN Co
- Port of registry: United Kingdom, Glasgow
- Builder: Barclay, Curle & Co, Whiteinch
- Yard number: 501
- Laid down: 1913
- Launched: 7 March 1913
- Completed: June 1913
- Acquired: June 1913
- In service: June 1913
- Out of service: 25 August 1917
- Identification: Official number: 133116
- Fate: Torpedoed and sunk on 25 August 1917
- Notes: Call letters: JCDR

General characteristics
- Type: Passenger ship
- Tonnage: 7,884 GRT
- Length: 137.2 metres (450 ft 2 in)
- Beam: 17.7 metres (58 ft 1 in)
- Depth: 10.1 metres (33 ft 2 in)
- Installed power: Twin triple expansion engines
- Propulsion: 2 screw propellers
- Speed: 13.5 knots (25.0 km/h; 15.5 mph)

SS Malda was a British passenger ship that was torpedoed and sunk by the German submarine SM U-70 130 nautical miles (240 km) west of the Bishop Rock, Isles of Scilly in the Atlantic Ocean on 25 August 1917 with the loss of 64 lives, while she was travelling from Boston, United States to London, United Kingdom with general cargo.

== Construction ==
Malda was launched at the Barclay, Curle & Co shipyard in Glasgow, Scotland on 7 March 1913, and completed in June that same year. The ship was 137.2 metres (450 ft 2 in) long, had a beam of 17.7 metres (58 ft 1 in) and a depth of 10.1 metres (33 ft 2 in). She was assessed at 7,884 GRT and had a pair of triple expansion engines producing 900 nhp, driving twin screw propellers. The ship could reach a maximum speed of 13.5 knots (25.0 km/h; 15.5 mph) and had two masts and one funnel. As built, she had the capacity to carry 75 passengers and 11,000 tons of cargo. She had six sister ships: Mantola, Manora, Mashobra, Merkara, Mandala and Margha.

== Early career ==
Malda completed her trails on the river Clyde in June 1913 and was subsequently used on the London–Kolkata route with stops in Karachi and Bombay. She also sailed to British East Africa and Durban during her career.

== World War I service and sinking ==
Malda had several encounters with German submarines during her World War I service, but as she was lightly armed to protect herself against such threats, she was able to outgun two U-boats on 20 June 1916 and 16 October 1916 respectively, both of which these incidents had occurred in the Mediterranean Sea. A third encounter followed on 11 November 1916 in the English Channel, but Malda was able to escape unscathed due to the weather conditions at the time. The final non-fatal encounter occurred on 30 December 1916, when a U-boat fired a torpedo at Malda, but ended up missing the ship.

Malda was travelling from Boston, United States to London, United Kingdom under the command of Captain Charles Davidson while carrying general cargo, when she was hit by a torpedo from SM U-70 130 nautical miles (240 km) west of the Bishop Rock, Isles of Scilly in the Atlantic Ocean on 25 August 1917 at 1.40 pm during a gale. The torpedo struck the ship on the port side and the explosion killed four crew members and ended up flooding the engine room. The crew abandoned the ship in her lifeboats while the U-boat surfaced and attempted to communicate with the surviving crew, but were prevented from it because of the ongoing gale. The lifeboat commanded by Captain Davidson set sail for the Isles of Scilly but was encountered by an eastbound convoy, who picked them up and landed them at Milford Haven. Meanwhile, the lifeboat commanded by the first officer stayed with slowly foundering Malda and contemplated to board the ship again in order to attempt to save her. But he was prevented from reboarding by the still present SM U-70, who remained with the ship until it sank the following morning. The remaining lifeboats reached land at several places in the United Kingdom, and it was later revealed that a total of 64 crew were lost alongside Malda.

== Wreck ==
The wreck of Malda lies 130 nautical miles (240 km) west of the Bishop Rock, Isles of Scilly in the Atlantic Ocean. The current condition of the wreck is unknown.
