= October 1917 =

Month in 1917

<<	October 1917					>>
Su	Mo	Tu	We	Th	Fr	Sa
	1	2	3	4	5	6
7	8	9	10	11	12	13
14	15	16	17	18	19	20
21	22	23	24	25	26	27
28	29	30	31

The following events occurred in October 1917:

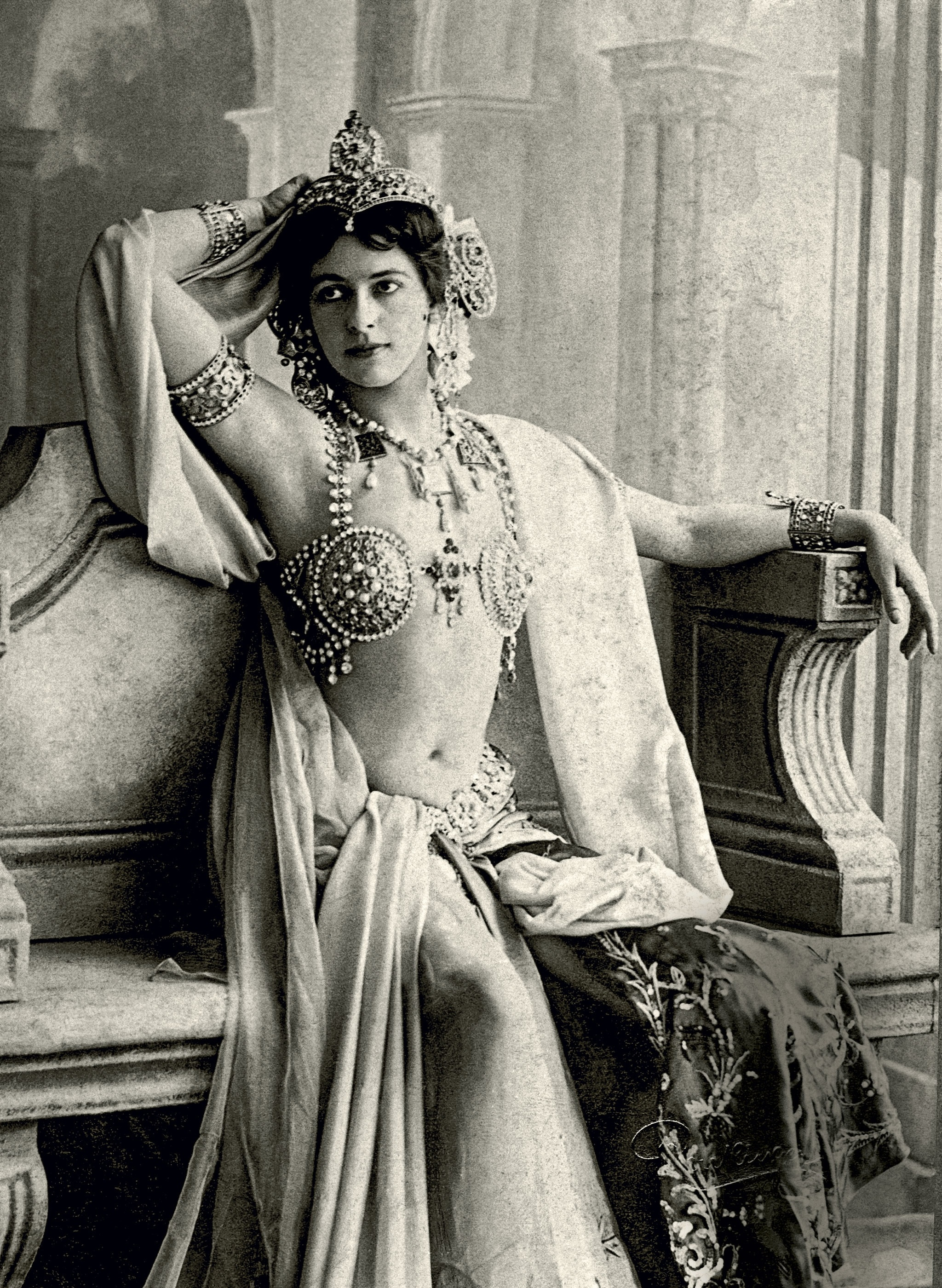
Mata Hari, former famed exotic dancer, executed in France for spying.

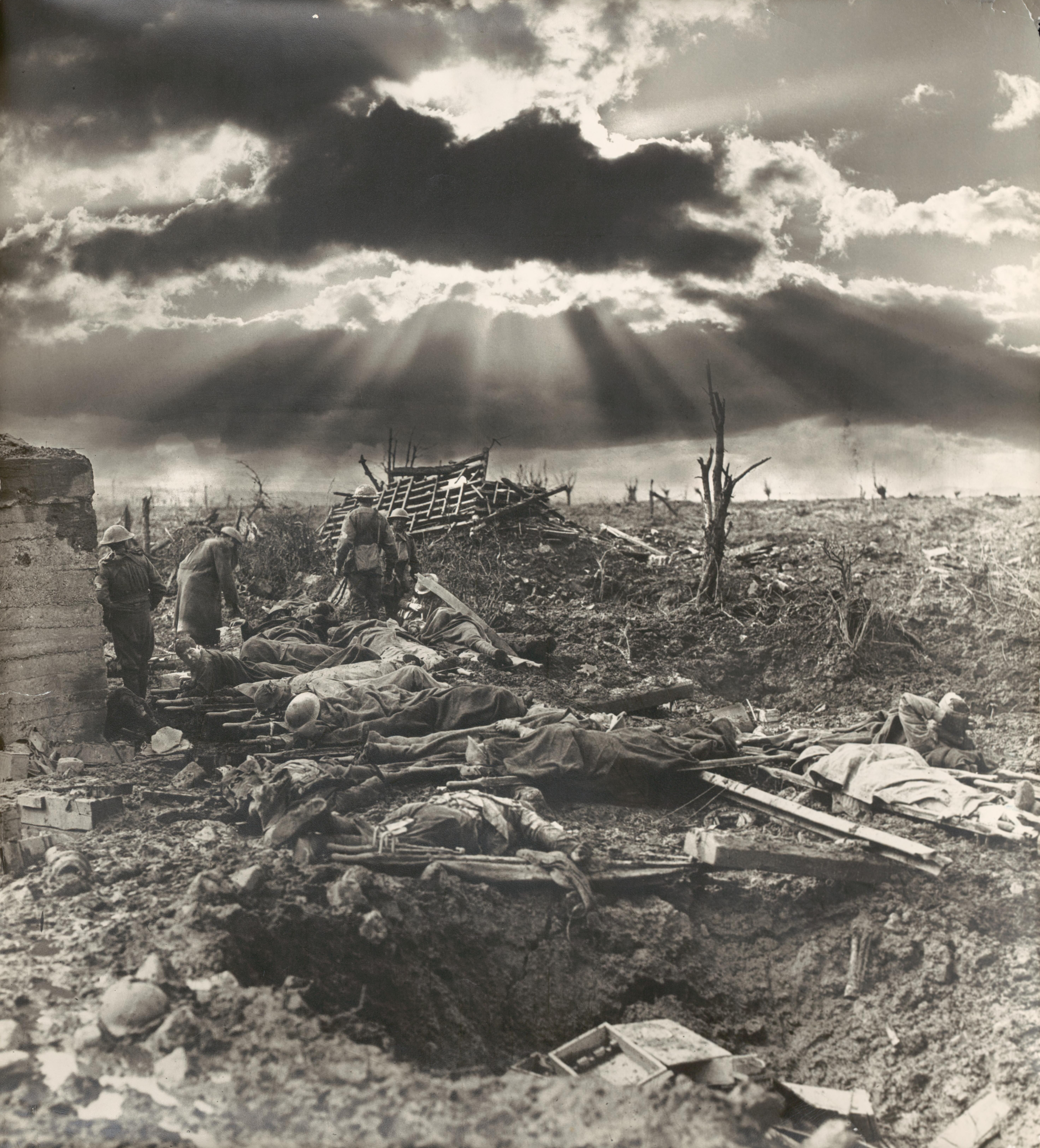
Battlefield after the first day of fighting at the First Battle of Passchendaele. Photo by Frank Hurley.

== October 1, 1917 (Monday) ==
- Germany launched counterattacks on British positions in Polygon Wood, West Flanders, Belgium.
- Eighteen Gotha bombers of the Luftstreitkräfte (German Air Force) set out on to raid the United Kingdom, with 11 of them reaching England. British antiaircraft guns fired 14,000 rounds at them without scoring a single hit, but falling fragments from spent antiaircraft shells from the worn-out guns killed eight and injured another 67 people.
- United States Coast Guard ship USS Mohawk collided with a British cargo ship in the Atlantic Ocean off Sandy Hook, New Jersey and sank, with all 77 crew members rescued.
- The Royal Navy conducted the first launch of an aircraft from a battleship. Royal Naval Air Service Flight Commander Frederick Rutland took off in a Sopwith Pup fighter from a platform mounted on a 15-inch (381-mm) gun turret of the battlecruiser HMS Repulse.
- The Royal Navy tested an aircraft catapult for the first time, using a compressed-air catapult aboard Slinger to launch an unmanned Short aircraft in a series of trial launches.
- The 139th Infantry Regiment of the United States Army was established with the merger of infantry regiments from Kansas and Missouri.
- The U.S. government established the Aircraft Board with Howard E. Coffin as chair.
- Albert Einstein was appointed director of the newly formed Kaiser Wilhelm Institute for Physics in Munich (now the Max Planck Institute for Physics).
- Born:
  - Guido Fibbia, Italian air force officer, top fighter ace for Regia Aeronautica during World War II, two-time recipient of the Silver Medal of Military Valor and the Iron Cross; in Treviso, Kingdom of Italy (present-day Italy) (d. 1988)
  - Cahal Daly, Irish clergy, Archbishop of Armagh and Primacy of Ireland from 1990 to 1996; as Charles Brendan Daly, in Loughguile, Ireland (d. 2009)
- Died: Ivan Aguéli, 48, Swedish artist and writer, known for his melding of Post-Impressionism with Arabic art following his conversion to Islam; killed in a train accident (b. 1869)

== October 2, 1917 (Tuesday) ==
- Finland held parliamentary elections with the Social Democratic Party of Finland winning 44 per cent of the vote.
- Royal Navy armored cruiser HMS Drake was torpedoed and sunk by German submarine U-79 off Rathlin Island with the loss of 18 out of her 900 crew.
- The Flying Field at Anacostia, a U.S. military air base, was opened to train pilots and test new aircraft. It was renamed the Anacostia Experimental Flying Field shortly thereafter and eventually the Bolling Air Force Base after Colonel Raynal Bolling on July 1, 1918.
- Born:
  - Christian de Duve, English biologist, recipient of the Nobel Prize in Physiology or Medicine for his research into cell biology; in Thames Ditton, England (d. 2013)
  - Charles Drake, American actor, known for roles in Winchester '73 and Harvey; as Charles Ruppert, in New York City, United States (d. 1994)
  - Francis Jackson, English composer and organist, director of York Minster from 1946 to 1982; in Malton, North Yorkshire, England (d. 2021)
  - Rosaleen Norton, New Zealand-Australian occultist, proponent of witchcraft and wiccanism in Sydney, earning her the media nickname "The Witch of Kings Cross"; in Dunedin, New Zealand (d. 1979)
- Died: Camille Tissot, 48, French naval officer, pioneer of wireless telegraphy; died of tuberculosis and influenza (b. 1868)

== October 3, 1917 (Wednesday) ==
- A soldiers' revolt erupted at a garrison in Dubno, Ukraine.
- German submarine SM UC-14 struck a mine and sank in the North Sea with the loss of all 14 crew.
- The National Party of the United States held its first conference in Chicago where it formally endorsed American participation in World War I.
- Born:
  - Les Schwab, American business leader, founder of Les Schwab Tire Centers; in Bend, Oregon, United States (d. 2007)
  - Odd Lundberg, Norwegian speed skater, silver and bronze medalist at the 1948 Winter Olympics; in Brandbu, Norway (d. 1983)

== October 4, 1917 (Thursday) ==
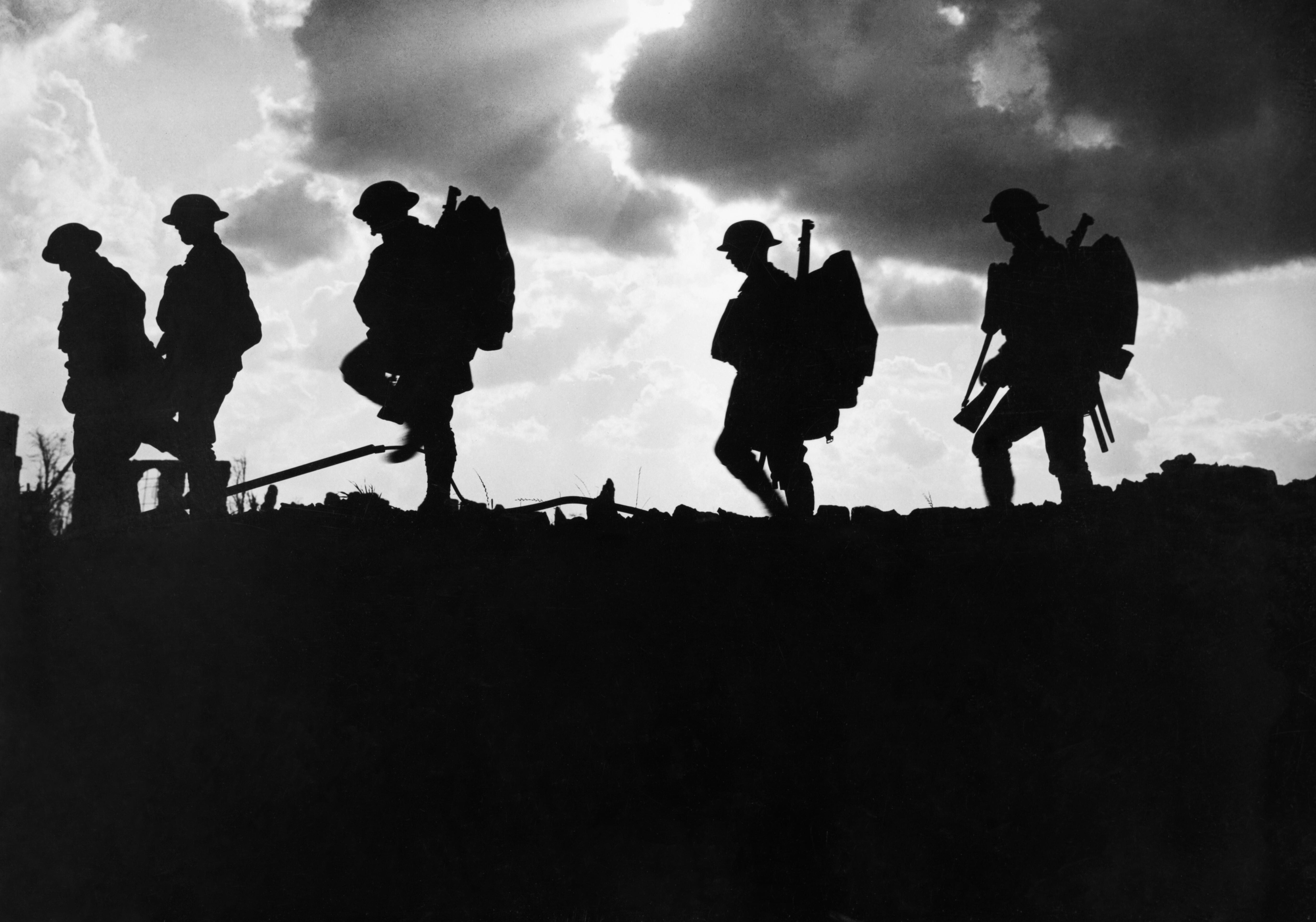
British soldiers going up to the front line during the Battle of Broodseinde. Photo by Ernest Brooks.

- Battle of Broodseinde – The British Second and Fifth Armies, supported by the First ANZAC Corps, overwhelmed German Fourth Army's defenses at Broodseinde Ridge in West Flanders, Belgium. Some 5,000 German troops were taken prisoner, adding to the 30,000 casualties the army suffered overall in the first 10 days of fighting in October. British suffered around 20,000 casualties, including 6,423 for Australia and 1,853 for New Zealand.
- An Italian royal decree was issued allowing heavy criminal sanctions against anyone who committed or incited acts of defeatism.
- Born:
  - Violeta Parra, Chilean folk musician, leading figure in the Nueva canción movement that popularized traditional Chilean music; in San Carlos, Chile (d. 1967)
  - Luis Carniglia, Argentine football player and manager, striker for the Boca Juniors in the 1940s and manager for Real Madrid in the 1950s; in Olivos, Buenos Aires, Argentina (d. 2001)
- Died: Dave Gallaher, 43, Irish-born New Zealand rugby player, team captain for The Original All Blacks and member of the New Zealand national rugby union team from 1896 to 1909; killed in action during the Battle of Passchendaele (b. 1873)

== October 5, 1917 (Friday) ==
- German submarine SM UB-41 struck a mine and sank in the North Sea off Scarborough, England with the loss of all 22 crew.
- The Palestine Brigade of the Royal Flying Corps was established to provide air support during the Sinai and Palestine campaign, which included the No. 40 Wing.
- British politician Arthur Lee donated the country house Chequers to the British government.
- Born:
  - Allen Ludden, American game show host, best known for the television game show Password; as Allen Packard Ellsworth, in Mineral Point, Wisconsin, United States (d. 1981)
  - Magda Szabó, Hungarian novelist, known for works including Abigél; in Debrecen, Austria-Hungary (present-day Hungary) (d. 2007)

== October 6, 1917 (Saturday) ==
- The fourth and final Duma, the legislative assembly of the Russian Empire, formally ended and was dissolved, with the Russian Provisional Government anticipating elections for the Russian Constituent Assembly to replace it.
- The U.S. government enacted the Trading with the Enemy Act, which restricted trade with countries hostile to the United States.
- Born:
  - Marjorie Guthrie, American choreographer, wife to folk singer Woody Guthrie and mother to Arlo Guthrie; as Marjorie Greenblatt, in Atlantic City, New Jersey, United States (d. 1983)
  - Fannie Lou Hamer, American activist, chief organizer of Freedom Summer for the civil rights movement; as Fannie Lou Townsend, in Montgomery County, Mississippi, United States (d. 1977)

== October 7, 1917 (Sunday) ==
- The largest airship ever built at the time, the L 57, was wrecked and destroyed by fire while trying to take off for a test flight in poor weather. The Zeppelin aircraft was 743 feet (226 meters) in length and could carry 2,418,700 cubic feet (68,490 cubic metres) of hydrogen gas for long-distance flights from Europe to Africa.
- German submarine SM U-106 struck a mine and sank in the North Sea with the loss of all 41 crew.
- Born:
  - June Allyson, American actress, best known for her on-screen pairings with Van Johnson in films such as Too Young to Kiss in which she won a Golden Globe; as Eleanor Geisman, in New York City, United States (d. 2006)
  - Rose Piper, American painter, known for abstract works inspired by blues music including The Death of Bessie Smith; as Rose Theodora Sams, in New York City, United States (d. 2005)
- Died: Serhii Vasylkivsky, 62, Ukrainian artist, known his prolific work on Ukraine including the Cossack series (b. 1854)

== October 8, 1917 (Monday) ==
- German submarine SM U-96 sank British cargo ships SS Memphian and SS Greldon in St George's Channel, killing 32 and 28 crew respectively.
- German submarine SM U-57 sank British cargo ship SS Richard de Larrinaga in the Atlantic Ocean, killing 35 crew.
- The Royal Flying Corps established air squadrons No. 90 and No. 107.
- Born:
  - Danny Murtaugh, American baseball player and manager, second baseman for Philadelphia Phillies, Boston Braves and Pittsburgh Pirates from 1941 to 1951, manager of the Pittsburgh Pirates during the 1960 and 1971 World Series; as Daniel Edward Murtaugh, in Chester, Pennsylvania, United States (d. 1976)
  - Billy Conn, American boxer, world light heavyweight champion from 1939 to 1941; as William David Conn, in Pittsburgh, United States (d. 1993)
  - Rodney Robert Porter, English biochemist, recipient of the Nobel Prize in Physiology or Medicine for his research on antibodies; in Newton-le-Willows, England (d. 1985)
  - Tex Banwell, British army officer, served as political decoy for Field Marshal Bernard Montgomery during World War II; as Keith Deamer Banwell, in Newport, Essex, England (d. 1999)
  - Walter Lord, American writer, author of A Night to Remember, about the sinking of the Titanic; as John Walter Lord Jr., in Baltimore, United States (d. 2002)
- Died: Ebenezer Ward, 80, Australian politician, member of the South Australian House of Assembly from 1870 to 1900 (b. 1837)

== October 9, 1917 (Tuesday) ==
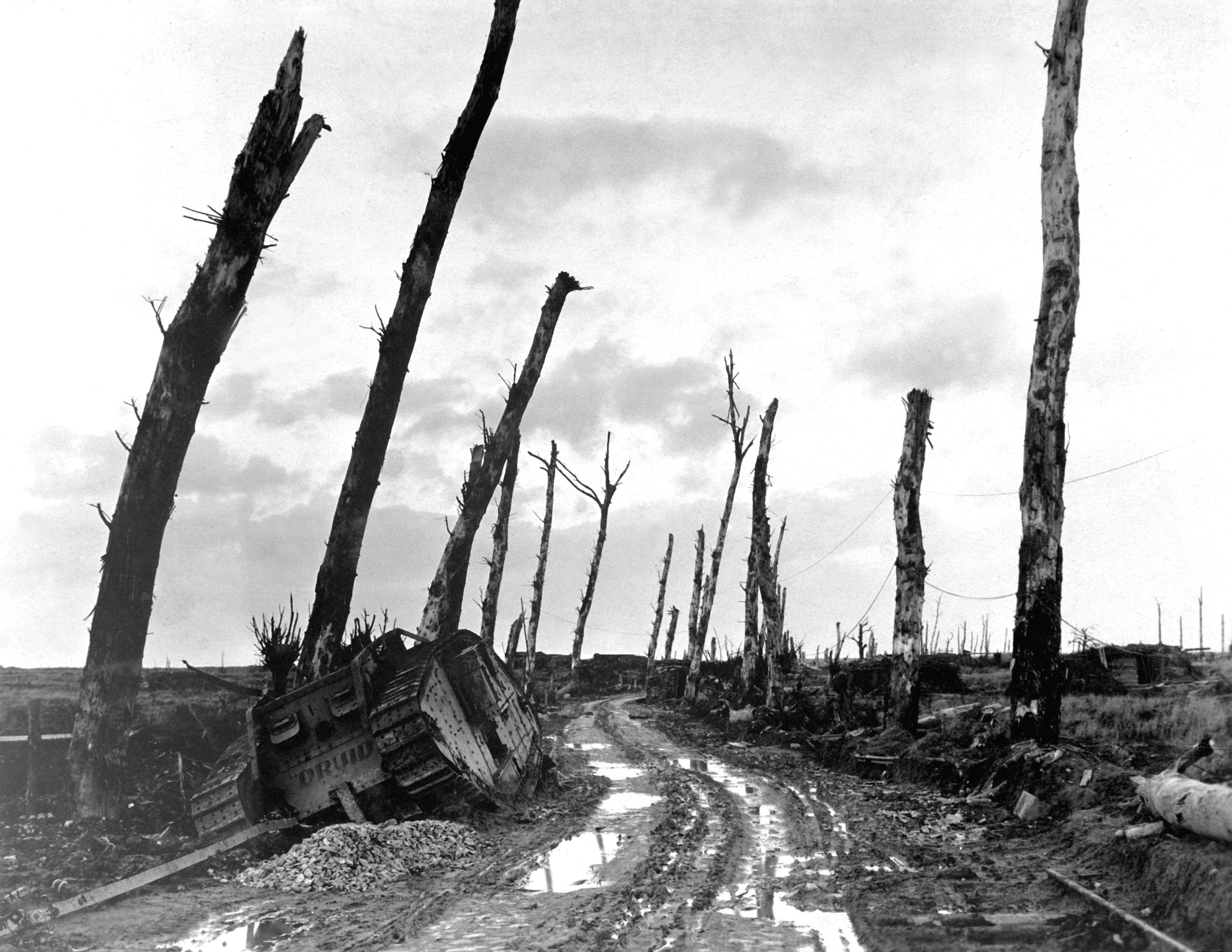
Ruined street in Poelcappelle, Belgium.

- Battle of Poelcappelle – German forces halted the British advance on the Western Front in West Flanders, Belgium but at a cost of 35,000 casualties during the first ten days of October. Total British and Commonwealth casualties for the day's fighting were around 11,500.
- During the Battle of Poelcappelle, a squad of 71 Australian soldiers with the 10th Battalion disappeared without a trace in Celtic Wood during a diversionary attack on German positions. Speculations for the unaccounted men ranged from clerical error to the troops being massacred and buried in a mass grave (though German records made no mention of such an incident). Official Australian military documents confirm at least 37 men remained unaccounted.
- Royal Navy cruiser HMS Champagne was torpedoed and sunk in the Irish Sea by German submarine SM U-96 with the loss of 58 of her 305 crew.
- The U.S. Marines established the 8th Marine Regiment.
- Died:
  - Hussein Kamel of Egypt, 63, Egyptian noble, Sultan of Egypt from 1914 to 1917 (b. 1853)
  - Sarah Aaronsohn, 27, Jewish Palestinian spy, member of the Nili spy network, sister to botanist Aaron Aaronsohn; died by suicide (b. 1890)

== October 10, 1917 (Wednesday) ==
- A coalition of Conservative, Liberal and independent members of Canadian Parliament led by Prime Minister Robert Borden formed the Unionist Party of Canada to enact conscription and govern Canada through the remainder of World War I.
- Japanese Government Railways extended the Ban'etsu East Line in Fukushima Prefecture, Japan with stations Kawamae and Natsui serving the line.
- The first novel of the science fiction series Barsoom, A Princess of Mars, by Edgar Rice Burroughs was published in hardcover by A.C. McClurg & Company.
- Norwegian sports club Tønsberg-Kameratene was established in Tønsberg, Norway with sections for association football, track and field, boxing, wrestling and weightlifting.
- Born: Thelonious Monk, American jazz musician, known for numerous jazz hits including "'Round Midnight", "Blue Monk", and "Straight, No Chaser", second most recorded jazz artist after Duke Ellington; in Rocky Mount, North Carolina, United States (d. 1982)
- Died: Henry Crimmel, 73, American artist, renowned glass-maker and co-founder of the Novelty Glass Company and Sneath Glass Company (b. 1844)

== October 11, 1917 (Thursday) ==
- Operation Albion – A German amphibious force landed at Tagalaht on the island of Saaremaa in the Russian-controlled West Estonian archipelago in the Baltic Sea to capture the islands and stage a launching point to attack Petrograd.
- The Armenian National Congress met in Tbilisi, Georgia to determine the role the Armenian population would play in post Imperial Russia.
- The No. 41 Wing was established by the Royal Flying Corps with Lieutenant-Colonel Cyril Newall in command.
- The United States Army established the 28th, 30th, and 31st Infantry Divisions.
- The Richmond Professional Institute was established in Richmond, Virginia as a medical and healthcare professional school.

== October 12, 1917 (Friday) ==
- First Battle of Passchendaele – Allied forces failed to take key defensive ridges held by the Germans west of the village of Passchendaele, Belgium. The brunt of the 13,000 casualties were taken by ANZAC units, with the New Zealand division suffering 2,725 casualties including 845 killed, the single biggest loss for New Zealand (roughly one in 1,000 of the nation's population at that time). German casualties were estimated at 12,000.
- Operation Albion – German forces captured 20,000 Russian prisoners and 100 guns as they expanded out from Tagalaht to the rest of the island of Saaremaa in the Baltic Sea.
- The first regiment was stationed at the newly commissioned Naval Operating Base in Norfolk, Virginia.
- The Brazilian sports club Fonseca was established in Niterói, Brazil, and included association football, martial arts, swimming and gymnastics.
- Born: James McAuley, Australian poet and literary critic, known for poetry collections including A World of its own and literary criticism such as The rhetoric of Australian poetry; in Lakemba, New South Wales, Australia (d. 1976)
- Died:
  - George Augustus King, 32, New Zealand army officer, commander of the New Zealand Pioneer Battalion; killed in action at the Battle of Passchendaele (b. 1885)
  - Clarence Jeffries, 22, Australian army officer, recipient of the Victoria Cross; killed in action at the Battle of Passchendaele (b. 1894)
  - Lewis McGee, 29, Australian soldier, recipient of the Victoria Cross for action during the Battle of Broodseinde; killed in action at the Battle of Passchendaele (b. 1888)

== October 13, 1917 (Saturday) ==
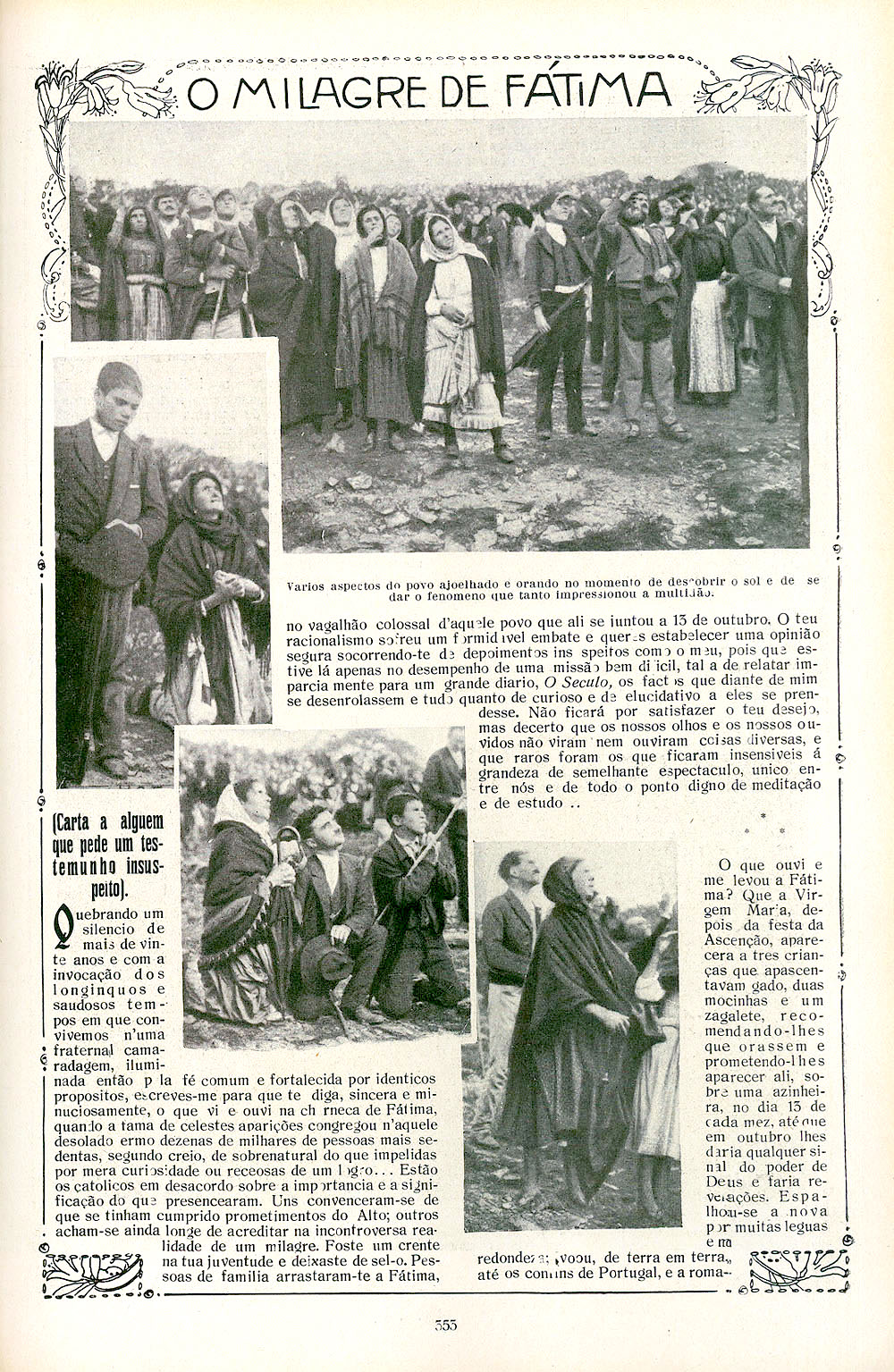
"Miracle of the Sun on front page of Ilustração Portuguesa, 29 October 1917.

- Miracle of the Sun – A massive gathering of pilgrims in Fátima, Portugal, estimated between 30,000 and 40,000 (with another report going as high as 100,000), simultaneously witnessed the sun change colors and move in impossible paths across the sky for ten minutes. The miraculous event was foretold by local children Lúcia dos Santos and siblings Francisco and Jacinta Marto, who had been experiencing visions from Our Lady of Fátima for months. After years of investigation, the Catholic Church concluded in 1930 that the event was genuine. However, skeptics have cited mass delusion brought on by weeks of speculation or meteorological illusions as the cause.
- Tire manufacturer Yokohama was established in Tokyo as a joint venture between Yokohama Cable Manufacturing and B.F. Goodrich.
- The United States Oil & Gas Association was established in Tulsa, Oklahoma which at the time was considered the "Oil Capital of the World".
- The city of South Euclid, Ohio was incorporated.
- Born: George Osmond, American entertainer, patriarch of The Osmonds family singing group; in Etna, Wyoming, United States (d. 2007)
- Died: Florence La Badie, 29, American actress, best known for work in the film serial The Million Dollar Mystery in which she performed her own stunts; killed in a car accident (b. 1888)

== October 14, 1917 (Sunday) ==
- British cargo ship SS Semantha was torpedoed and sunk in the Mediterranean Sea by German submarine SM UC-74 with the loss of 32 of her crew.
- German submarine SM UC-62 struck a mine and sank in the North Sea with the loss of all 26 crew.
- The Uruguay national football team won its second South American Championship, defeating Argentina 1–0 in the series final in Parque Pereira, Montevideo.
- The St. Clements Roman Catholic Church held its first Mass in Saratoga Springs, New York.
- The historic drama Cleopatra was released, with Theda Bara in the starring role as the Egyptian queen. Directed by J. Gordon Edwards, the film also starred Fritz Leiber as Julius Caesar and Thurston Hall as Mark Antony. Controversy around its sensual images only made the film more popular and the biggest hit of 1917. The film was considered lost but some fragments along with production stills survived, allowing a portion of the film to be reconstructed for screening at the Hollywood Heritage Museum.
- The Argentine football club Almirante Brown de Arrecifes was established in Arrecifes, Argentina.
- Born: Geoffrey Bibby, English archaeologist, best known for the discovery of the ancient city of Dilmun and the pioneer of Arabian archaeology; as Thomas Geoffrey Bibby, in Heversham, England (d. 2001)
- Died:
  - Nathaniel Hone the Younger, 85, Irish painter, member of the Hone family (b. 1831)
  - Eddie Latheron, 29-30, English football player, inside forward for the Blackburn Rovers from 1906 to 1917 and the England national football team from 1913 to 1914; killed in action at the Battle of Passchendaele (b. 1887)

== October 15, 1917 (Monday) ==
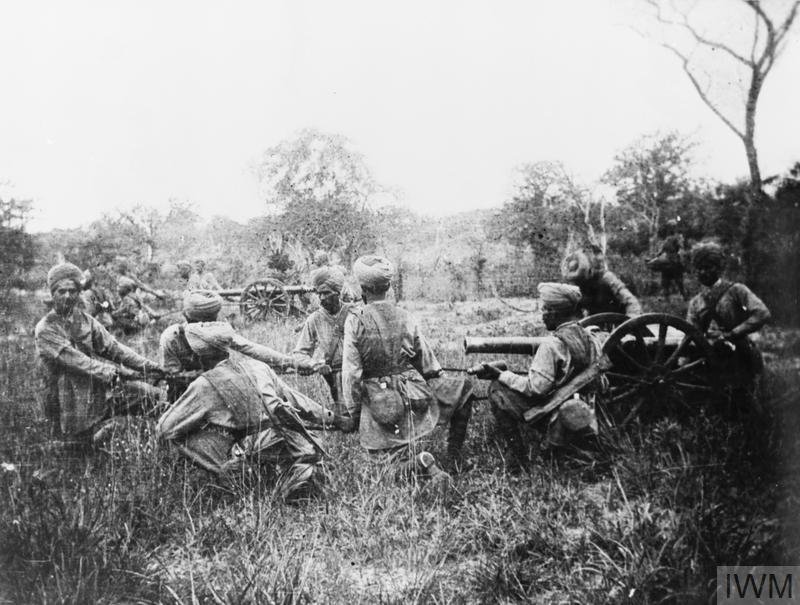
Indian artillery soldiers at Battle of Mahiwa.

- Battle of Mahiwa – Nigerian colonial troops under command of General Jacob van Deventer fought German colonial soldiers under command of Major-General Kurt Wahle at Mahiwa, German East Africa (now Tanzania). General Paul von Lettow-Vorbeck, commander of forces in German East Africa, sent additional battalions that encircled the Nigerian force.
- The first naval action between the United States Navy and Imperial German Navy occurred when American destroyer USS Cassin exchanged fire with German submarine SM U-61 off the coast of Ireland, with both vessels damaged. The sole casualty was U.S. sailor Osmond Ingram, who jettisoned several depth charges from a point where a German torpedo was about to hit, saving the ship from catastrophic damage. He was awarded the Medal of Honor posthumously, and was the first recorded enlisted American casualty of World War I.
- Dutch dancer Mata Hari was executed by firing squad at Vincennes outside Paris for spying on behalf of Germany.
- The Chicago White Sox defeated the New York Giants to win the World Series by four games to two.
- Royal Navy air officer John Alcock oversaw the first test flight of his experimental fighter biplane, named the Alcock Scout. However, only one had been made and when it crashed on another test flight in 1918, no further models were built.
- Born:
  - Arthur M. Schlesinger Jr., American historian, recipient for the Pulitzer Prize for Biography or Autobiography for his historic volume A Thousand Days on the Presidency of John F. Kennedy; as Arthur Bancroft Schlesinger, in Columbus, Ohio, United States (d. 2007)
  - Kevin Boland, Irish politician, cabinet minister for the Irish Assembly from 1965 to 1976; in Dublin, Ireland (d. 2001)
  - Ruairí Brugha, Irish politician, member of the Fianna Fáil (Irish Parliament) from 1962 to 1982; in Dublin, Ireland (d. 2006)
  - Alan W. Livingston, American music and television producer, best known for the television western Bonanza and the creation of Bozo the Clown, founder of Capitol Records; as Alan Wendell Levison, in McDonald, Pennsylvania, United States (d. 2009)
  - Jan Miner, American actress, best known as Madge in the television Colgate-Palmolive commercials; as Janice Miner, in Boston, United States (d. 2004)
- Died: Maxime Collignon, 67, French archaeologist, known for his research in ancient Greek art and architecture (b. 1849)

== October 16, 1917 (Tuesday) ==
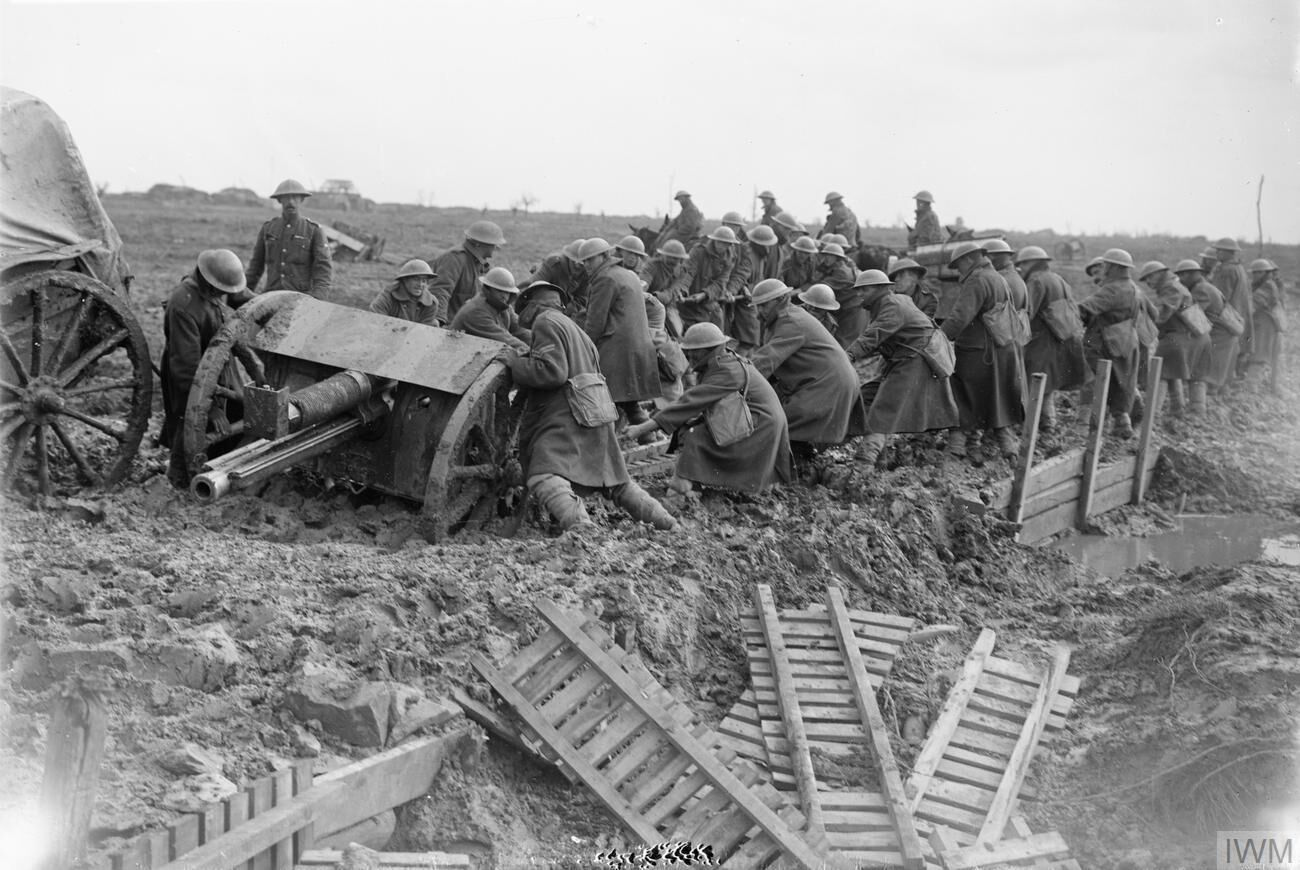
British soldiers pushing an 18-pounder field gun through mud near Langemark, Belgium.

- The first free elections in the Dutch East Indies were held.
- Battle of Moon Sound – British submarines engaged but failed to halt the progress of a German naval squadron dispatched to control the Baltic Sea around the West Estonian archipelago.
- Battle of Mahiwa – South African reinforcements attacked German troops from the opposing side, but the Germans regrouped to a ridge near Mahiwa to hold off the attacks.
- Operation Albion – German forces won complete control of the island of Saaremaa in the Baltic Sea.
- Born:
  - Alice Pearce, American actress, best known as Gladys Kravitz in the 1960s television sitcom Bewitched in which she won an Emmy posthumously; in New York City, United (d. 1966)
  - Murray MacLehose, British colonial administrator, 25th Governor of Hong Kong; as Crawford Murray MacLehose, in Glasgow, Scotland (d. 2000)
- Died: Walter Flex, 30, German writer, author of The Wanderer between the Two Worlds; killed in action (b. 1887)

== October 17, 1917 (Wednesday) ==
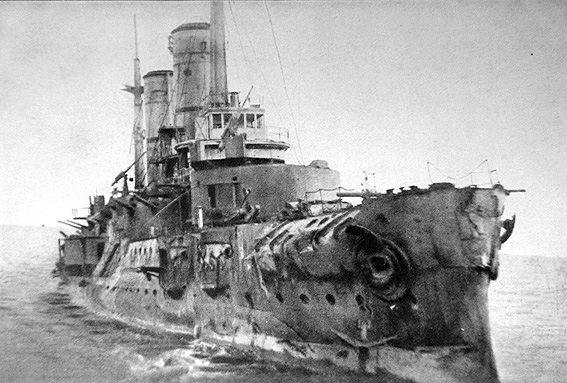
Russian pre-dreadnought Slava sinking during Battle of Moon Sound.

- German light cruisers Brummer and Bremse ambushed an Allied convoy in the North Sea, sinking British destroyers Mary Rose and Strongbow along with several Scandinavian merchant ships carrying coal. Over 300 naval and civilian crew were killed in the attack.
- Battle of Moon Sound – German and Russian naval squadrons clashed in the Baltic Sea, ending with a Russian retreat and the loss of its pre-dreadnought battleship Slava, which was too damaged to retreat and had to be scuttled.
- U.S. Army troopship USAT Antilles was torpedoed and damaged in the Bay of Biscay by German submarine SM U-105 with the loss of 67 lives. Survivors were rescued by USS Corsair before the ship was scuttled.
- The Trans-Australian Railway opened, linking 1,052 miles (1,693 km) of railroad between Port Augusta in South Australia and Kalgoorlie in Western Australia. The rail included 309 miles (497 km) of straight rail with no curves across the Nullarbor Plain, making it the world's longest railway straight.
- The Co-operative Party was formed as the official political party of the British co-operative movement.
- The German football club BC Aichach was established in Aichach, Germany.
- Born:
  - Martin Donnelly, New Zealand cricketer, member of the New Zealand national cricket team in 1937; in Ngāruawāhia, New Zealand (d. 1999)
  - Adele Stimmel Chase, American artist, best known for her ceramics works that became part of Pop art and Op art movements; in San Francisco, United States (d. 2000)
  - Dick Young, American sports journalist, baseball columnist for the New York Daily News for 45 years; as Richard Leonard Young, in New York City, United States (d. 1987)
  - Marsha Hunt, American actress, known for her roles in Born to the West, These Glamour Girls, and Johnny Got His Gun, member of the Committee for the First Amendment during the Hollywood blacklist; as Marcia Virginia Hunt, in Chicago, United States (d. 2022)
  - Sumner Locke Elliott, Australian writer, author of Careful, He Might Hear You and Rusty Bugles; in Sydney, Australia (d. 1991)
- Died: John Franklin Botume, 61, American singer and choir director, author on several books on singing including Modern Singing Methods: Their Use and Abuse (b. 1855)

== October 18, 1917 (Thursday) ==
- Battle of Mahiwa – A German force of 1,500 men counterattacked and repelled the attacking South African and Nigerian force of 4,900 men, inflicting 2,700 casualties. The Germans suffered between 500 and 600 casualties, or thirty percent of its strength.
- Operation Albion – Russian forces evacuated from Muhu in the Baltic Sea.
- Born:
  - Mamie Phipps Clark, American psychologist, co-founder with husband Kenneth Clark of Harlem Youth Opportunities Unlimited; in Hot Springs, Arkansas, United States (d. 1983)
  - Robert A. Lewis, American air force officer, co-pilot of the Enola Gay that dropped the first A-bomb on Hiroshima; in Ridgefield Park, New Jersey, United States (d. 1983)

== October 19, 1917 (Friday) ==
- Operation Albion – German forces landed at Hiiumaa Island in the Baltic Sea.
- Battle of Moon Sound – German ships entered the Gulf of Riga and began to clear the minefield, where most casualties occurred during the operation.
- Thirteen Zeppelins set out on a high-altitude raid against the middle of England but severe weather conditions prevented all but two from reaching their targets. One of the airships bombed London, killing 24 people and injuring nine others, as well as destroying the Austin Motor Works plant at Longbridge, England. The second airship bombed Northampton and London, killing 24 people and injuring nine others.
- Carl Swartz left office as Prime Minister of Sweden after dismal election results for the right-wing party in the September Riksdag elections. He was replaced by liberal leader Nils Edén.
- American ocean liner J. L. Luckenbach was torpedoed and damaged in the Atlantic Ocean by German submarine SM U-62. She was escorted to Le Havre, Seine-Maritime, France by U.S. Navy destroyer USS Nicholson where she was subsequently repaired and returned to service.
- Dallas Love Field was opened in Dallas as a military base for training pilots enlisted in World War I.
- The Luftstreitkräfte, the air arm of the Imperial German Army, established air squadron Jagdstaffel 80.
- The Institute of Quarrying was established during a meeting of quarry managers in Caernarfon, Wales. The organization expanded with branches in Australia, New Zealand, Malaysia, South Africa and Hong Kong.
- Born:
  - Walter Munk, Austrian-American oceanographer, best known for his tidal research into oceans and ocean currents with the Scripps Institution of Oceanography; in Vienna, Austria-Hungary (present-day Austria) (d. 2019)
  - Evgenia Antipova, Russian artist, member of the Leningrad School of Painting; in Toropets, Russian Republic (present-day Russia) (d. 2009)
  - Robert P. Baldwin, American air force pilot, recipient of the Silver Star and Legion of Merit for action during the Korean War; in Los Angeles, United States (d. 1994)
- Died: Bobby Atherton, 41, Welsh football player, midfielder and forward for various clubs including Hiberian and Middlesbrough from 1897 to 1906, member of the Wales national football team from 1899 to 1905; missing in action (b. 1876)

== October 20, 1917 (Saturday) ==
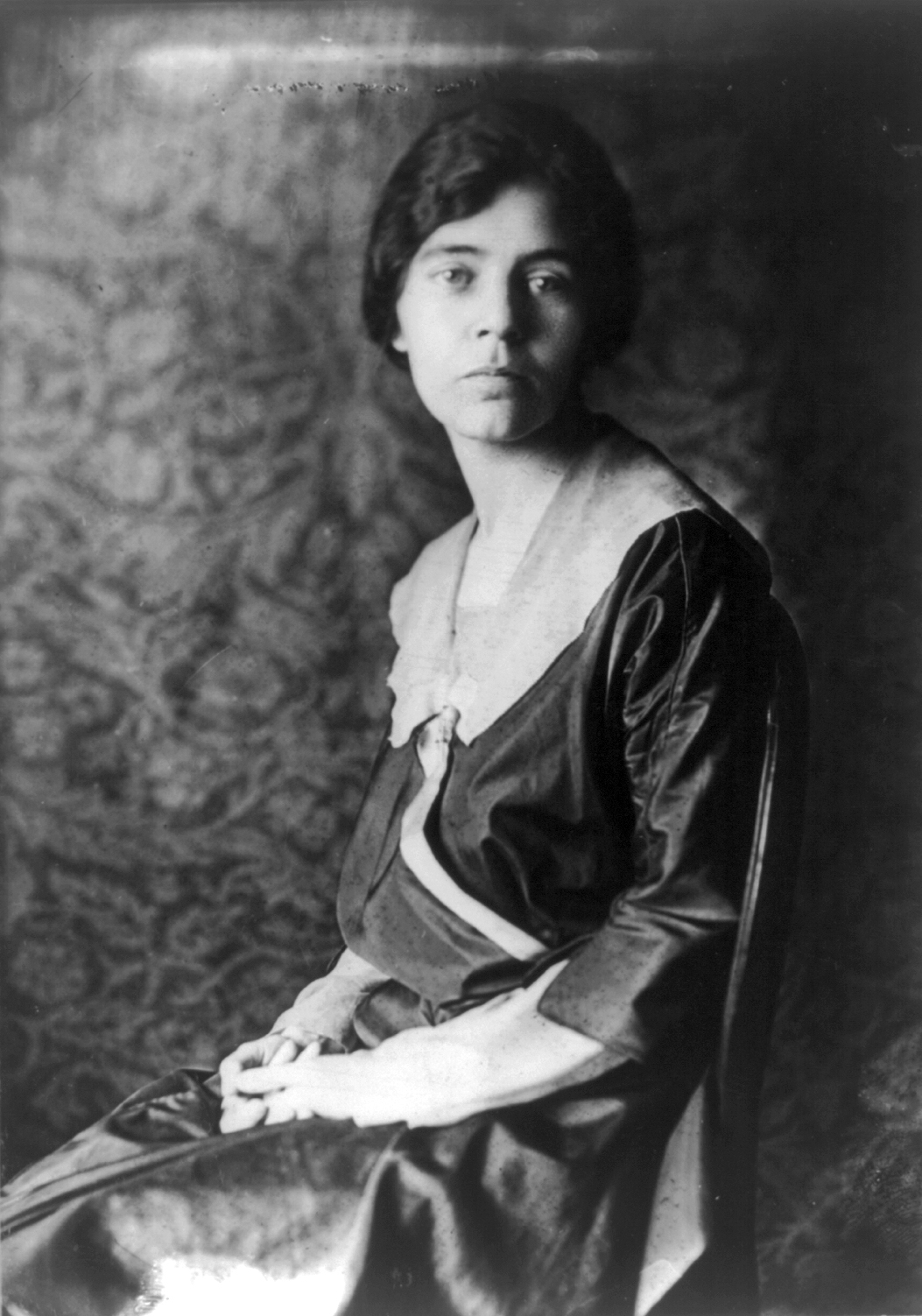
Suffragist Alice Paul, arrested in Washington, D.C.

- Operation Albion – German forces occupied all of Hiiumaa Island in the Baltic Sea, ending the campaign.
- British cargo ship Mahratta was launched by Robert Duncan & Co in Port Glasgow, Scotland. In a remarkable coincidence, the ship was wrecked in the English Channel in the exact spot as its predecessor.
- Police in Washington, D.C. arrested Alice Paul, a prominent member of the suffragist protest group Silent Sentinels, while she carried a banner that quoted U.S. President Woodrow Wilson: "The time has come to conquer or submit, for us there can be but one choice. We have made it." Paul was sentenced to seven months in prison where, after enduring two weeks of solitary confinement, was released to prison hospital where she started a hunger strike to protest the poor conditions of the Virginia penitentiary where many fellow Sentinel members were also imprisoned.
- Irish poet W. B. Yeats, then 51, married 25-year-old Georgie Hyde-Lees at the Harrow Road register office in London with Ezra Pound as best man. It had been a couple of months after he had a proposal of marriage to his ex-mistress's daughter, Iseult Gonne, rejected.
- The United States Army established the Aberdeen Proving Ground in Aberdeen, Maryland as an ordinance testing site.
- Born:
  - Jean-Pierre Melville, French film director, best known for his French New Wave crime dramas Le Doulos, Le Samouraï, and Le Cercle Rouge; as Jean-Pierre Grumbach, in Paris, France (d. 1973)
  - William F. Barnes, American college football player and coach, served as coach for the UCLA Bruins football team from 1958 to 1964; in Cape Girardeau, Missouri, United States (d. 2009)
  - Stéphane Hessel, German-French diplomat and Holocaust survivor, author of Time for Outrage!; as Stefan Friedrich Kaspar Hessel, in Berlin, German Empire (present-day Germany) (d. 2013)
- Died:
  - Elise Kemp, 36, New Zealand nurse, only military nurse from New Zealand to be killed in action in World War I; killed in action (b. 1881)
  - John T. Wilder, 87, American army officer, Union commander at the Battle of Hoover's Gap during the American Civil War (b. 1830)

== October 21, 1917 (Sunday) ==
- Malta held a general election for six out of its eight seats.
- Born: Dizzy Gillespie, American jazz trumpet musician, credited for the development of bebop and promotion of Afro-Cuban music; as John Birks Gillespie, in Cheraw, South Carolina, United States (d. 1993)

== October 22, 1917 (Monday) ==
- British forces launched two separate assaults on the German front in Belgium, capturing the village of Polecappelle but failing to seize a key road junction north of Houthulst Forest from German control. British casualties were 479 while German casualties were unknown, save for 125 prisoners.
- U.S. President Woodrow Wilson appointed A. Mitchell Palmer to head the Office of Alien Property Custodian which administered property seized from those deemed an enemy of the United States during World War I.
- The Charlie Chaplin-directed film The Adventurer, starring Chaplin regulars Edna Purviance and Eric Campbell, was released through Mutual Film. It was the last film by Campbell before his death in a car accident two months later.
- The Sherlock Holmes anthology of previously published stories His Last Bow included the newest short story of the same name by Arthur Conan Doyle.
- The first section of the Seibu Tamagawa Line for Tokyo opened for service.
- Born: Joan Fontaine, British-American actress, known for her roles in Rebecca, Jane Eyre and The Constant Nymph, recipient of the Academy Award for Best Actress for her role in Suspicion, sister to Olivia de Havilland; as Joan de Beauvoir de Havilland, in Tokyo, Empire of Japan (present-day Japan) (d. 2013)
- Died: Bob Fitzsimmons, 54, British boxer, held world champion titles in all three major weight classes, considered the lightest heavyweight champion in the Guinness World Records; died of pneumonia (b. 1863)

== October 23, 1917 (Tuesday) ==
- Battle of La Malmaison – The French Sixth Army attacked the German-held French village and fort of La Malmaison, France, capturing the communes of Allemant and Vaudesson.
- Battle of Wadi Musa – A force of 700 Arab rebel troops ambushed an Ottoman column dispatched to secure the Hejaz railway in Jordan, killing 400 men and capturing 300 prisoners.
- October Revolution – The Bolshevik Party voted in favor of overthrowing the Russian Provisional Government, with a resolution citing "an armed uprising is inevitable, and that the time for it is fully ripe."
- The Canadian Railway War Board (predecessor of the Railway Association of Canada) met for the first time at Windsor Station in Montreal.
- The German government established the Reich Economic Office, the predecessor to the Federal Ministry for Economic Affairs and Climate Action.
- Born: Robert Bray, American actor, best known for the role of ranger Corey Stuart in the TV series Lassie; in Kalispell, Montana, United States (d. 1983)
- Died: Eugène Grasset, 72, Swiss artist, pioneer of Art Nouveau (b. 1845)

== October 24, 1917 (Wednesday) ==
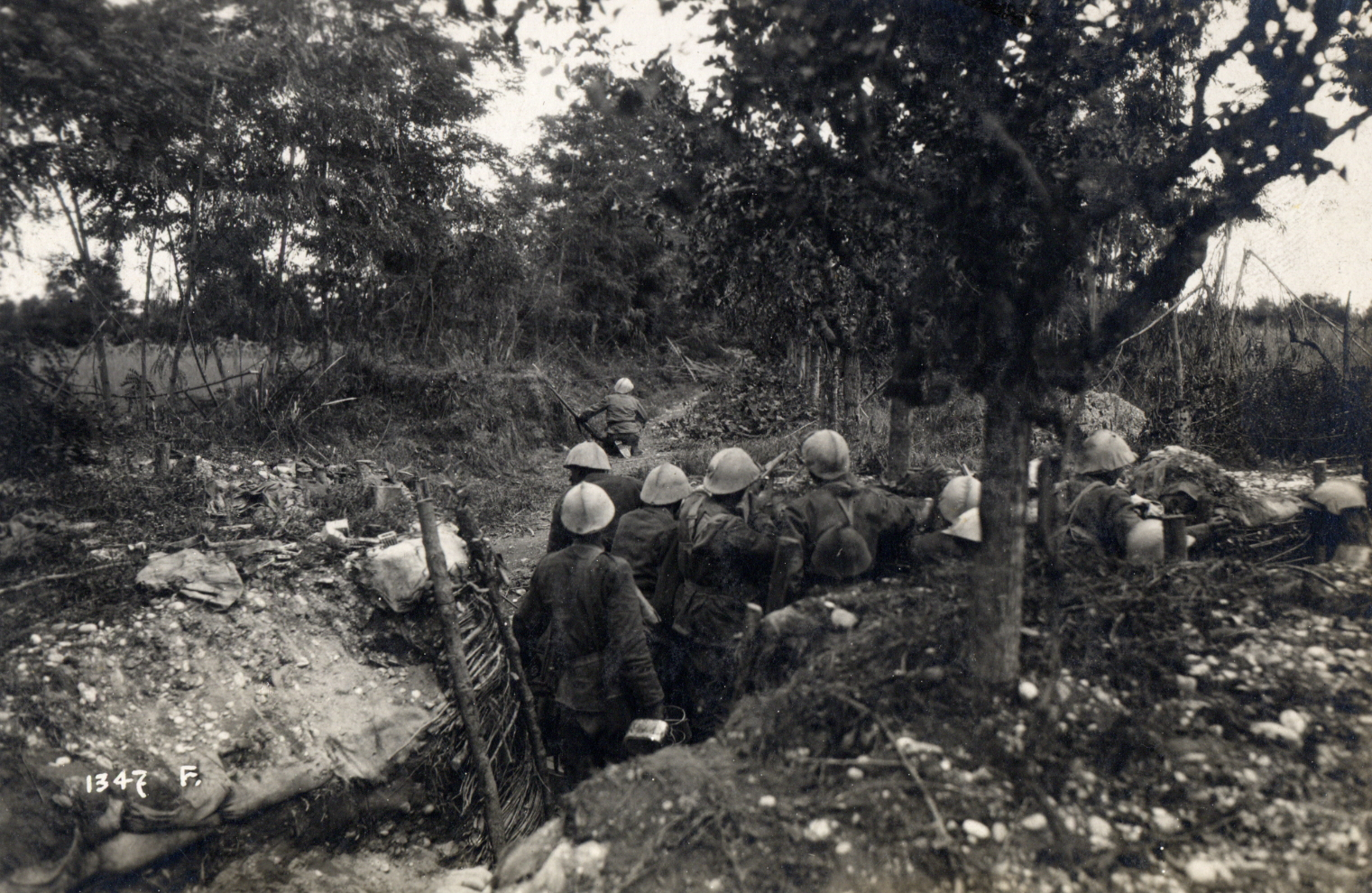
Entrenched Italian troops along the Piave river during the Battle of Caporetto.

- Battle of Caporetto – Also known as the Twelfth Battle of the Isonzo, Austro-Hungarian and German forces triggered 894 canisters that released chlorine gas onto the Italian Second Army entrenched in the valley. Most Italian soldiers retreated as their supplied gas masks could only last for two hours, with an estimated 500 to 600 defenders killed. The Central Powers then used infiltration tactics and stormtroopers armed with light machine guns, mortar launchers, grenades and flamethrowers to break through the line, leading to its collapse six days later.
- The No. 190 Squadron was established by the Royal Flying Corps at Rochford, England.
- Australian Flying Corps established air squadrons No. 7 and No. 8.
- Telephone inventor Alexander Graham Bell attended the unveiling of a monument to him in front of a crowd of thousands in Brantford, Ontario.
- Born:
  - Donald N. Aldrich, American marine officer, recipient of the Navy Cross and Air Medal for action in the Solomon Islands campaign during World War II; in Moline, Illinois, United States (d. 1947, killed in a plane crash)
  - Denys Val Baker, Welsh writer, author of The Door is Always Open and The Sea's in The Kitchen; in Upper Poppleton, England (d. 1984)
- Died: James Carroll Beckwith, 65, American artist, member of the Naturalism movement in the United States (b. 1852)

== October 25, 1917 (Thursday) ==
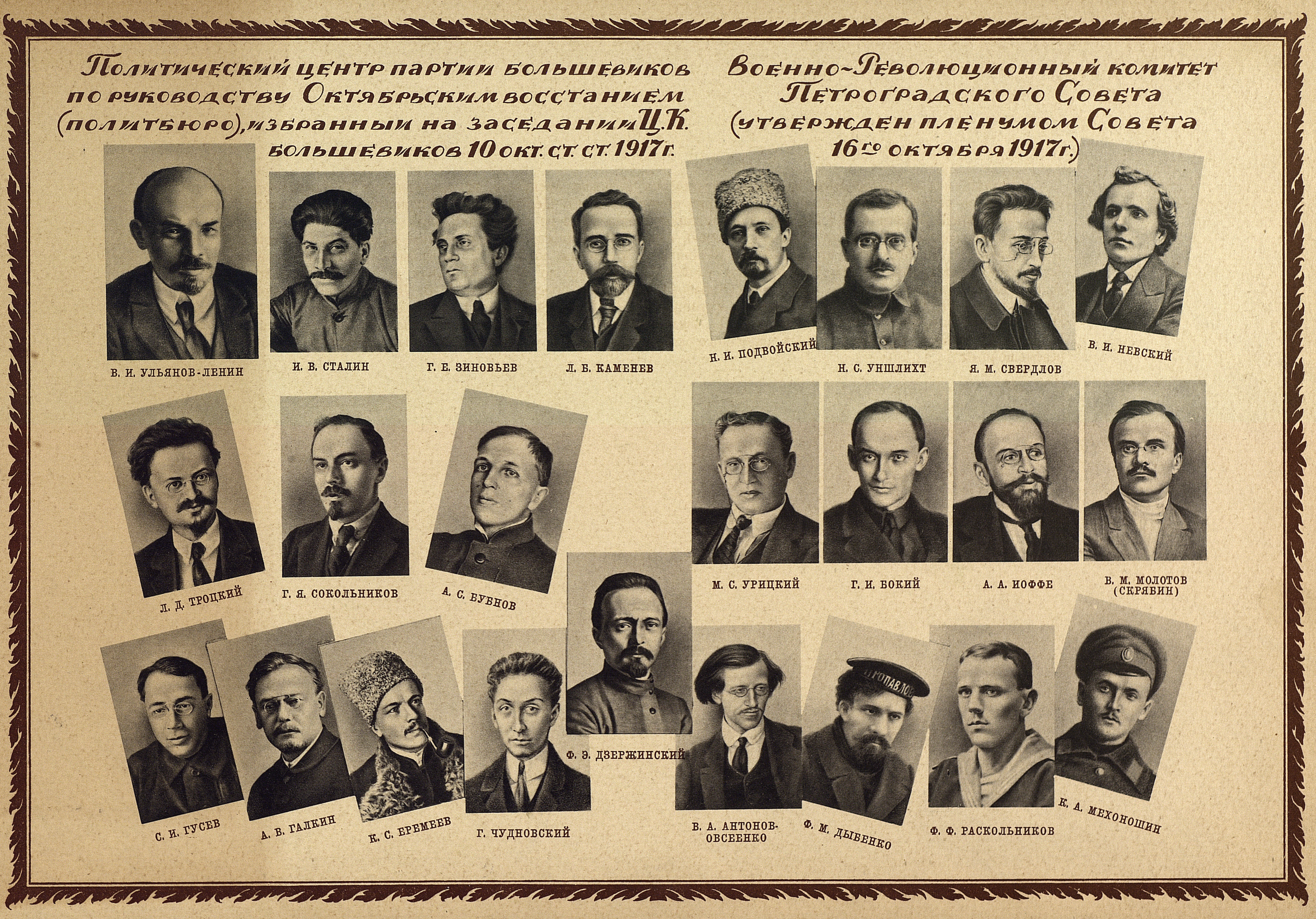
Poster showing the members of the Bolshevik Party that headed the October Revolution in Petrograd.

- The Petrograd Military Revolutionary Committee was established with Leon Trotsky as leader to organize the overthrow of the Russian Provisional Government.
- Some 1,700 Sinn Féin delegates attended a convention in the Dublin Mansion House as Arthur Griffith was replaced as the organisation's president with Éamon de Valera.
- The French Lyceum was established in Korçë, Albania, later renamed the Albanian National Lyceum in 1921 and the Raqi Qirinxhi High School in 1944.
- Born:
  - Carl Forssell, Swedish fencer, bronze medalist in the 1948 Summer Olympics and silver medalist in the 1952 Summer Olympics; in Stockholm, Sweden (d. 2005)
  - Lee MacPhail, American sports executive, president and general manager of the Baltimore Orioles and New York Yankees, and president of the American League, son to Larry MacPhail; as Leland Stanford MacPhail Jr., in Nashville, Tennessee, United States (d. 2012)
  - William Remington, American economist, convicted of perjury stemming from espionage charges made by Soviet spy Elizabeth Bentley; in New York City, United States (d. 1954, murdered in prison)
- Died:
  - Jack Standing, 31, English actor, best known for his Broadway roles including The Belle of New York and Florodora, and his film roles such as Hell's Hinges; died of pneumonia (b. 1886)
  - Maximilian Bayer, 45, German army officer, founder of Scouting in Germany and the 27th Jäger Battalion for the Imperial German Army; killed in action (b. 1872)

== October 26, 1917 (Friday) ==
- Brazil declared war against Germany.
- The Italian military disaster at Caporetto, Italy lead to the fall of the Paolo Boselli government.
- Second Battle of Passchendaele – British and Canadian forces attacked defensive ridges east of the village of Passchendaele, Belgium that the Allies failed to take earlier in the month.
- The United States Army established the 2nd Infantry Division which included the 3rd Infantry Brigade.
- Born: Mario Biaggi, American politician, U.S. Representative from New York from 1969 to 1988; in New York City, United States (d. 2015)

== October 27, 1917 (Saturday) ==
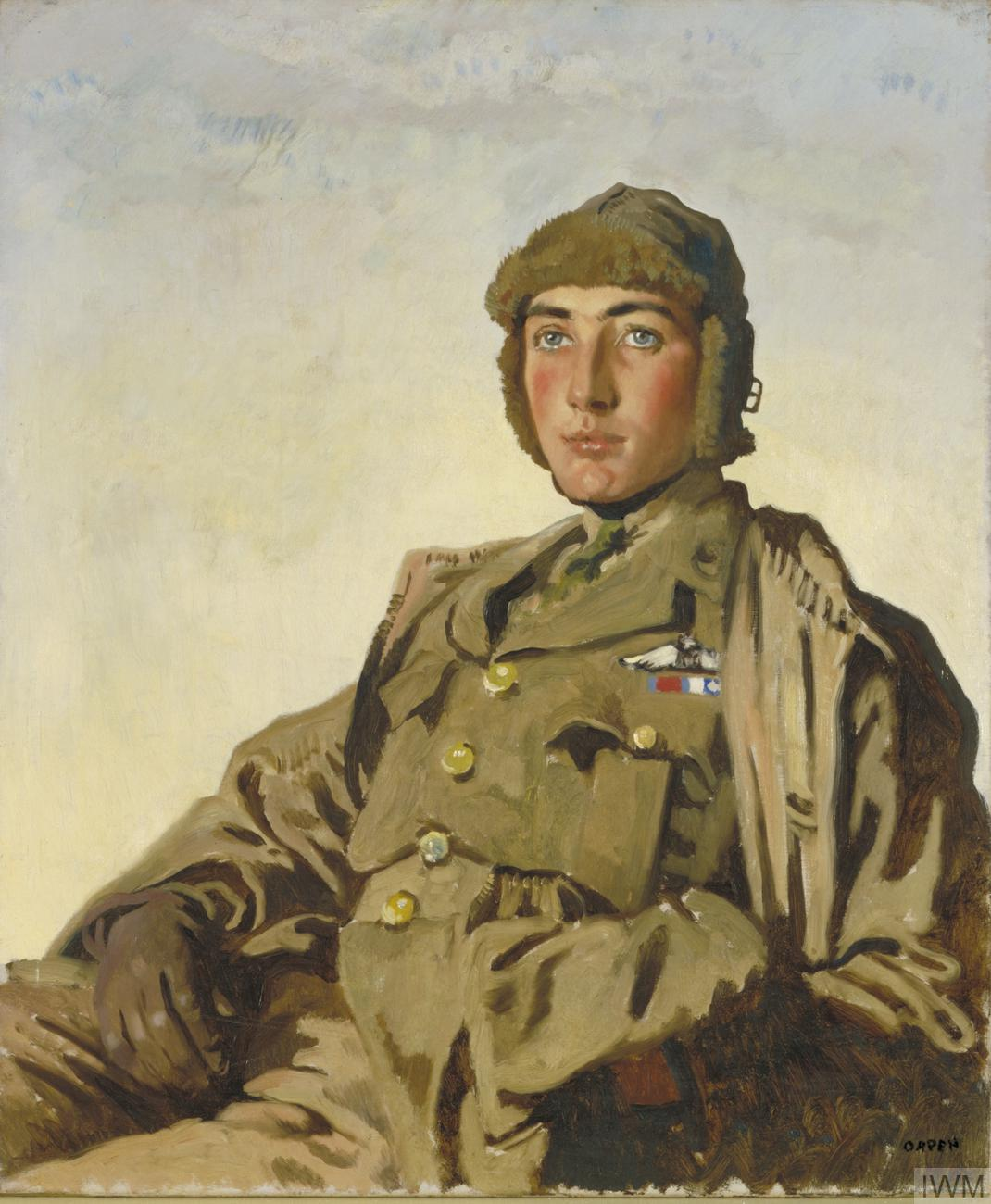
British flying ace Arthur Rhys-Davids.

- Battle of La Malmaison – The French Sixth Army captured the Pinon commune and the surrounding forest from the Germans in northern France, thus liberating the village and fort of La Malmaison, France from German control. French losses were 2,241 killed, 8,162 wounded and 1,460 missing. However, French forces captured 11,157 German prisoners and 1,100 machine gun, artillery and mortar pieces. German losses were estimated at 38,000 killed or missing.
- Third Battle of Gaza – British and French naval vessels bombarded Gaza to soften Ottoman defensive prior to infantry assault on November 1. An Ottoman aircraft strafed one of the British ships, killing 38 sailors.
- Battle of Buqqar Ridge – The Desert Mounted Corps repelled an Ottoman attack on its garrison at el Buqqar Ridge, Syria during the last days of the Stalemate in Southern Palestine.
- British flying ace Arthur Rhys-Davids disappeared while pursuing a German squadron east of Roeselare, Belgium. His death wasn't confirmed until December 29 when German command informed he had been shot down by German flying ace Karl Gallwitz. At the time, he had been credited with 27 victories including German aces Carl Menckhoff and Werner Voss.
- The Irish Volunteers held its convention immediately following the Sinn Féin convention, with most of the delegates having attended both. Newly elected Sinn Féin president Éamon de Valera was also elected president of the Volunteers.
- Russian violinist Jascha Heifetz made his famous American debut at Carnegie Hall in New York City.
- Born: Oliver Tambo, South African politician, President of the African National Congress from 1967 to 1991; in Nkantolo, Union of South Africa (present-day South Africa) (d. 1993)

== October 28, 1917 (Sunday) ==
- Switzerland held its federal election, with the Free Democratic Party of Switzerland retaining its majority in the National Council.
- Second Battle of Passchendaele – The Canadian forces advance slowed due to German resistance but were able to hold the line for reinforcements, at a cost of 2,481 casualties.
- U.S. Army troopship Finland was torpedoed and damaged in the Atlantic Ocean off Brest, France by German submarine SM U-93 with the loss of nine of her crew.
- Dublin beat Tipperary 5-4 and 4–2 in the All-Ireland Senior Hurling Championship Final in Croke Park, Dublin.
- The historical romance The Woman God Forgot, directed by Cecil B. DeMille and starring Geraldine Farrar in the title role, was released and became the fifth box office hit of the year. A copy of the film is in the George Eastman Museum.
- Born:
  - Honor Frost, Cyprus archaeologist, pioneer in underwater archaeology; in Nicosia, Cyprus (d. 2010)
  - Jack Soo, American actor, best known for the role of Nick Yemana in the police television sitcom Barney Miller; as Goro Suzuki, in Oakland, California, United States (d. 1979)
- Died:
  - Eugenio Elia Levi, 34, Italian mathematician, known for his contributions to group theory, brother to Beppo Levi; killed in action (b. 1883)
  - Prince Christian of Schleswig-Holstein, 86, Danish-British noble, husband to Princess Helena of the United Kingdom (b. 1831)
  - Cecil Rawling, 47, British explorer, commander of expeditions to Tibet and Dutch New Guinea; killed in action during the Battle of Passchendaele (b. 1870)
  - Isaac S. Taylor, 66, American architect, best known for his designs for key buildings in St. Louis (b. 1850)

== October 29, 1917 (Monday) ==
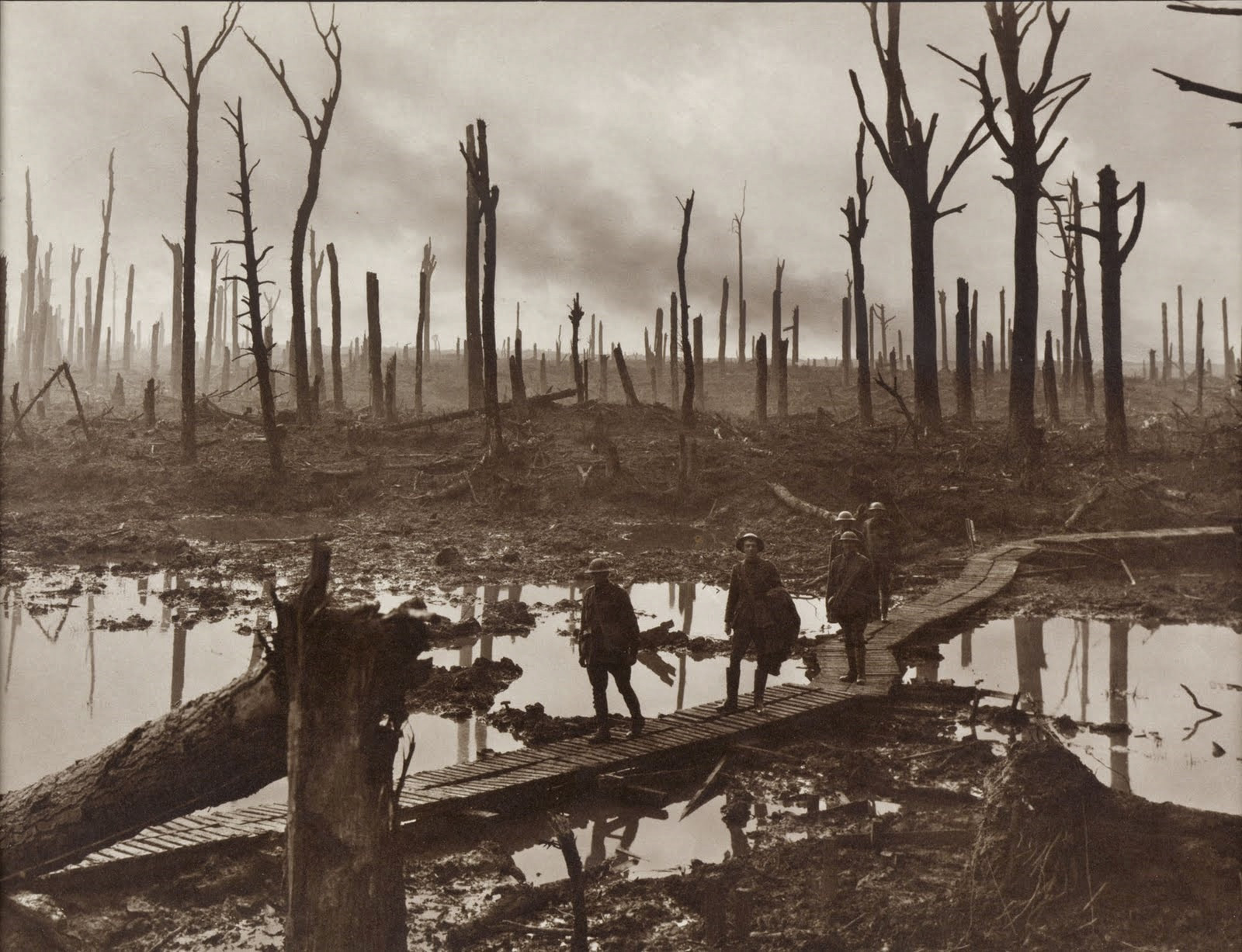
Australian troops crossing a flooded battlefield during the Battle of Passchendaele. Photo by Frank Hurley.

- Battle of Pozzuolo – Two Italian brigades staged a rearguard action against the advancing German and Austrian forces at Pozzuolo del Friuli, Italy as the Italian Second Army retreated from their disastrous defeat at the Battle of Caporetto.
- Three German Luftstreitkräfte (German Air Force) bombers set out for the first heavier-than-air night raid on England in four weeks. Two of the bombers diverted to Calais, France due to bad weather, but the third reached England and bombed the Essex coast.
- The United States Army established the 92nd Infantry Division.
- The Merriwa railway line in New South Wales, Australia was completed.
- Roscoe "Fatty" Arbuckle and Buster Keaton starred in the film comedy Coney Island.
- Born:
  - Eddie Constantine, American actor, best known for the role of Lemmy Caution, most notably in the French New Wave science fiction film Alphaville; as Israel Constantine, in Los Angeles, United States (d. 1993)
  - Harold Garfinkel, American sociologist, developed ethnomethodology as a field of inquiry for social behavior; in Newark, New Jersey, United States (d. 2011)

== October 30, 1917 (Tuesday) ==
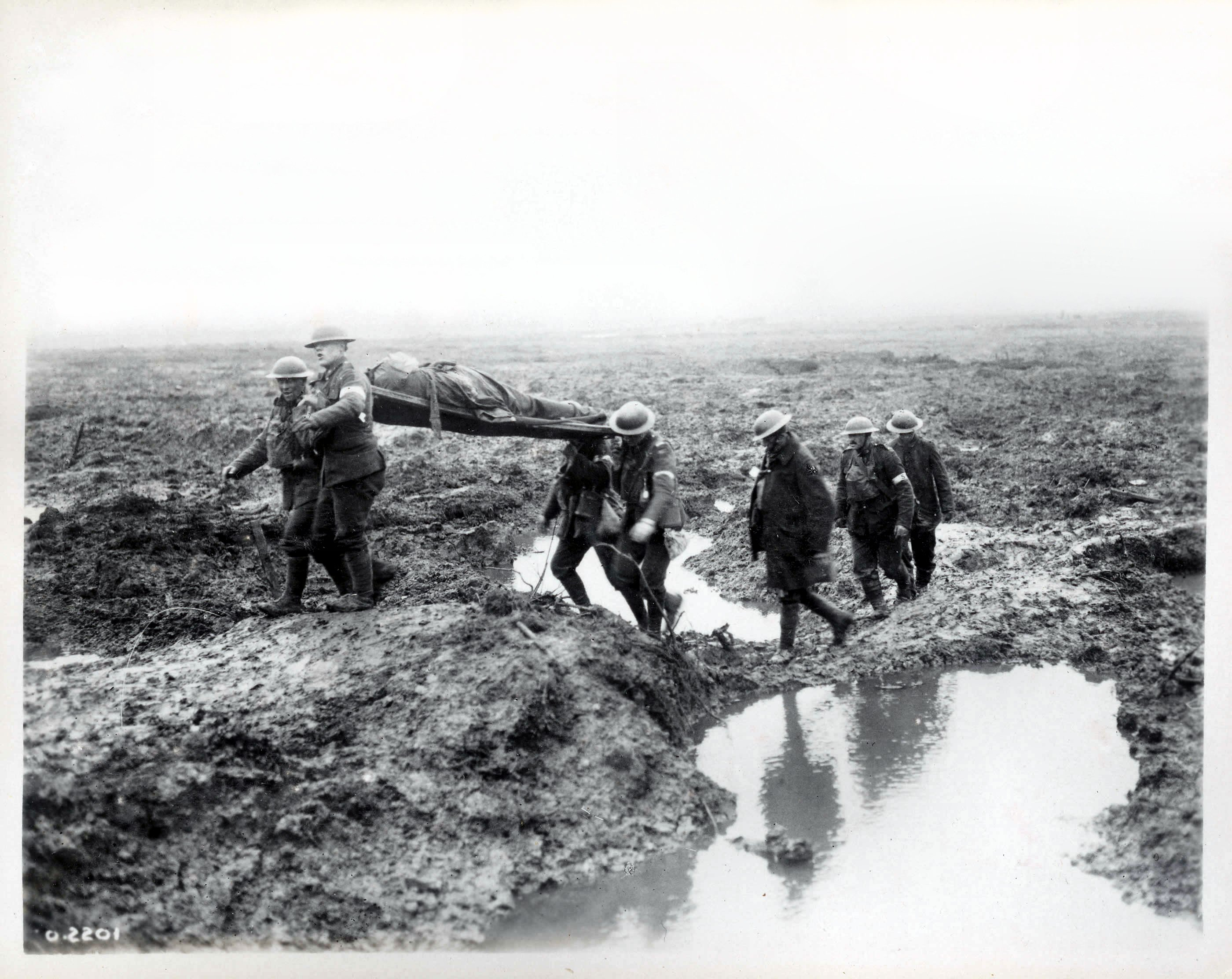
Canadian soldiers carry wounded at the Second Battle of Passchendaele.

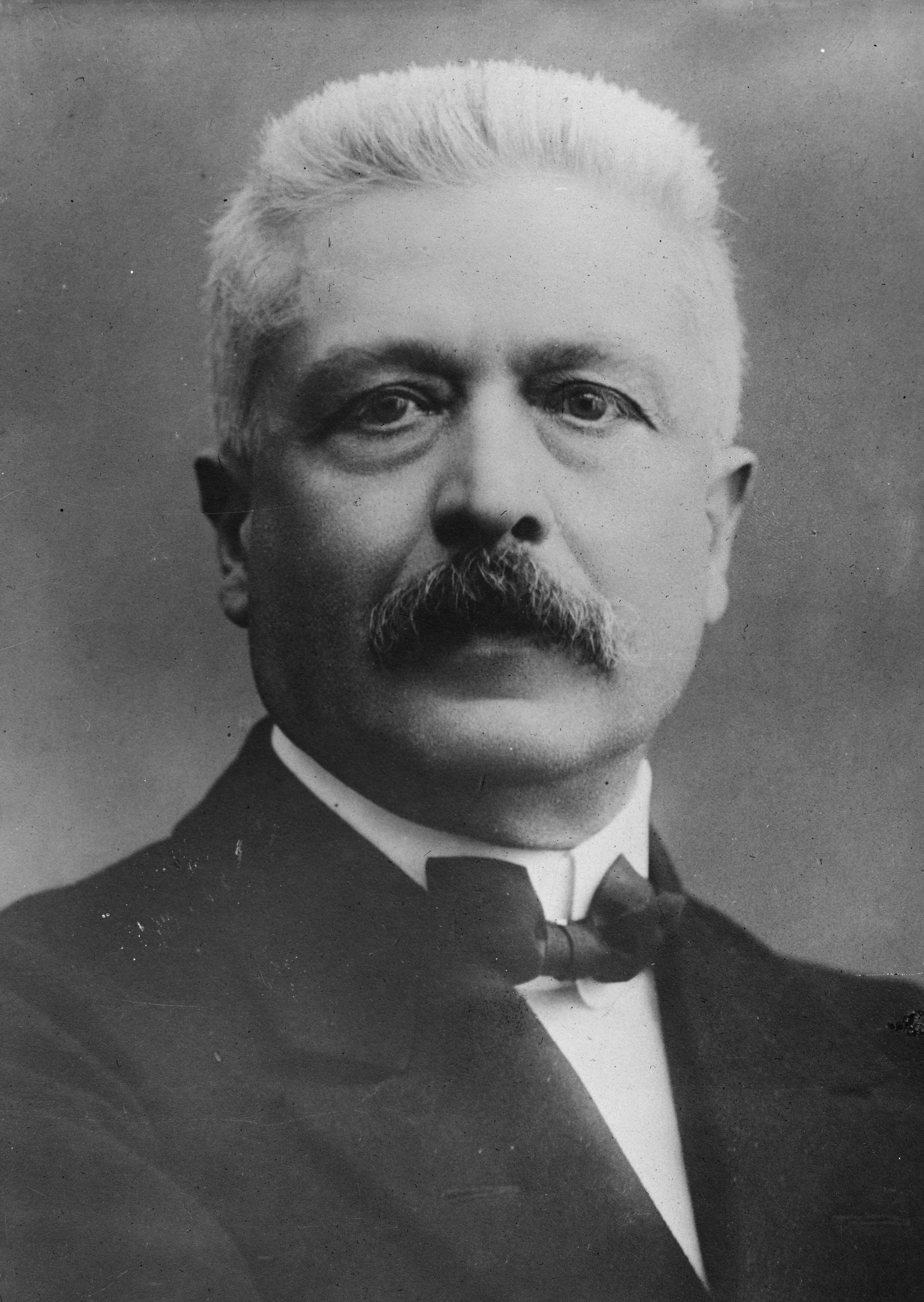
Vittorio Emanuele Orlando, Prime Minister of Italy

- Vittorio Emanuele Orlando replaced Paolo Boselli as Prime Minister of Italy and continued in that role through the rest of the war.
- Battle of Caporetto – After delaying a decision for five days despite pressure from his officers, Italian General Luigi Cadorna relented and ordered the Italian Second Army to retreat back to the Tagliamento River. Meanwhile, the two Italian brigades assigned to protect the rear were destroyed by the German and Austrian forces at the Battle of Pozzuolo.
- Second Battle of Passchendaele – Canadian forces advanced 600 yd (550 m) from the starting line, capturing key defense positions around the hamlets of Meetcheele and Goudberg, Belgium at the cost of 2,321 casualties.
- Charles Stewart became Premier of Alberta, replacing Arthur Sifton who had been chosen to be the provincial representative of the federal Unionist coalition in Ottawa.
- Twenty-two German Gotha bombers set out to raid London, with the newly developed 4.5 kg (9.9 lb) incendiary bomb included in their bomb loads. Fewer than half the bombers reached the London area, and many of the incendiary bombs failed to ignite for the bomb drops that were delivered. The remaining planes bombed Kent, destroying a gasometer in Ramsgate but achieving little else. Five of the bombers crashed while attempting to land upon returning to their bases. Bad weather prevented further raids against England until December.
- German flying ace Lieutenant Heinrich Gontermann was performing aerobatics when the upper wing of his Fokker fighter broke off, causing him to crash where he died from injuries. He had 39 victories, tying him with Lieutenant Carl Menckhoff as the 13th-highest-scoring German ace of World War I.
- The Institut d'optique Graduate School was established as a post-secondary school for the field of optics in France.
- Born:
  - Nikolai Ogarkov, Russian army officer, 36th Marshal of the Soviet Union; in Molokov, Russian Republic (present-day Russia) (d. 1994)
  - Maurice Trintignant, French race car driver, member of the Formula One circuit from 1950 to 1964, winner of the 1954 24 Hours of Le Mans race; in Sainte-Cécile-les-Vignes, France (d. 2005)
  - Anna Marly, Russian-French singer and songwriter, known for protest and political songs including "Chant des Partisans" and "La complainte du partisan"; as Anna Yurievna Betulinskaya, in Petrograd, Russian Republic (present-day Saint Petersburg, Russia) (d. 2006)
  - Bobby Bragan, American baseball player, catcher and shortstop for the Philadelphia Phillies and Brooklyn Dodgers from 1940 to 1948; as Robert Randall Bragan, in Birmingham, Alabama, United States (d. 2010)
  - Robert Maheu, American business executive, CEO of Nevada operations for Howard Hughes, author of Next to Hughes: Behind the Power and Tragic Downfall of Howard Hughes by His Closest Advisor; in Waterville, Maine, United States (d. 2008)
- Died: Alex Decoteau, 29, Cree Canadian athlete and law enforcer, first indigenous police officer in Canada, track and field representative for Canada at the 1912 Summer Olympics; killed in action at the Second Battle of Passchendaele (b. 1887)

== October 31, 1917 (Wednesday) ==
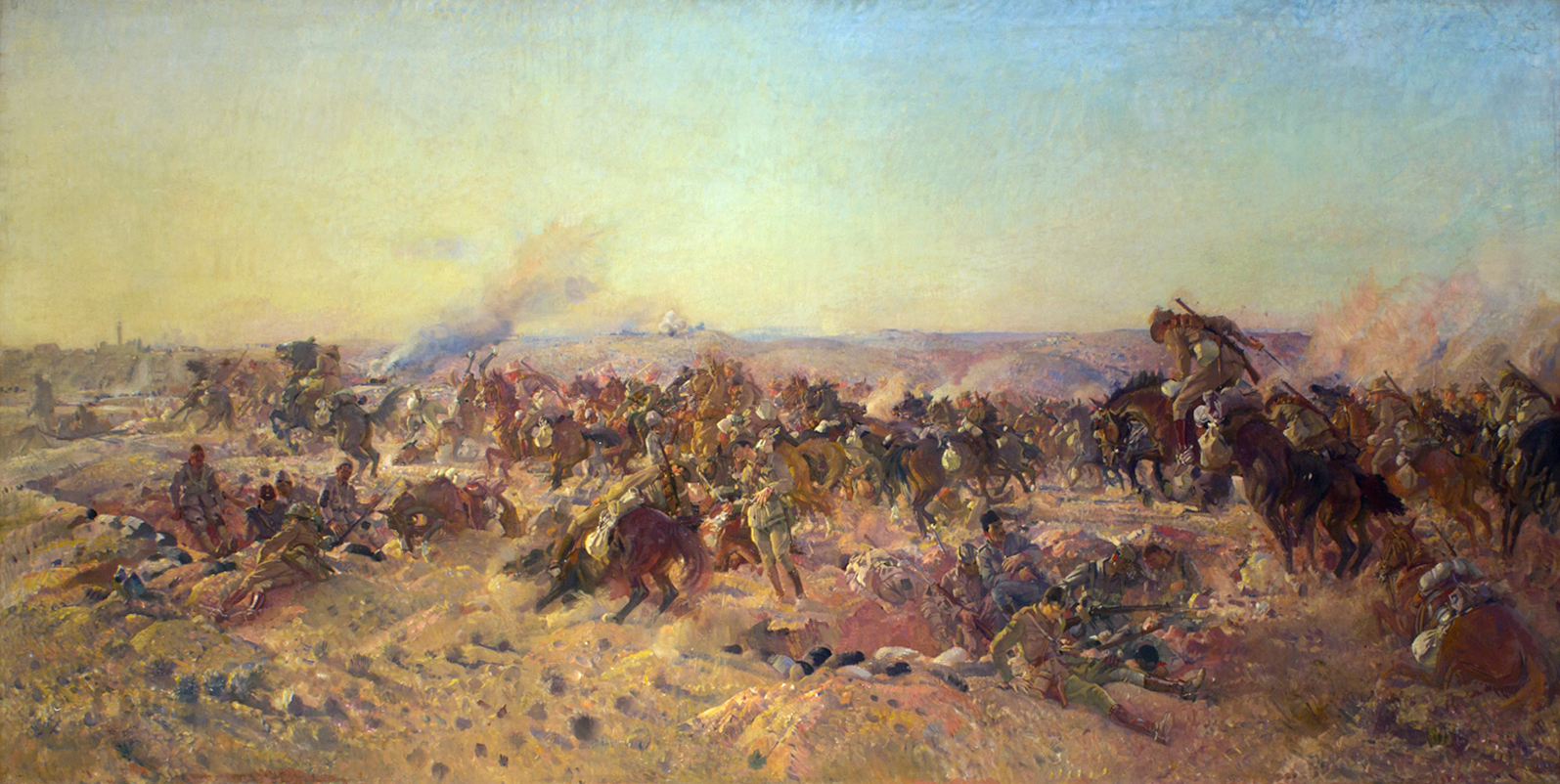
The charge of the Australian Light Horse at Beersheba, 1917, painted by George Lambert.

- Battle of Beersheba – The British 20th Corps and Desert Mounted Corps of the Egyptian Expeditionary Force attacked and captured Beersheba, Syria, from Ottoman forces, ending the stalemate in Southern Palestine and starting the Southern Palestine offensive. Some 1,947 Ottoman troops were taken prisoner and another estimated 1,000 were killed or wounded. British casualties were 171 killed. The capture of Beersheba was clinched with a rare (by this date) mounted charge by the Australian Mounted Division.
- Real estate services company Cushman & Wakefield was established in New York City by brothers-in-law J. Clydesdale Cushman and Bernard Wakefield. The firm now operates in 60 countries and employs more than 43,000 people.
- Born:
  - Patience Gray, British writer, known for best-selling cook and travel books including Plats Du Jour and Honey From A Weed; as Patience Jean Stanham, in Shackleford, England (d. 2005)
  - William H. McNeill, Canadian-born American historian, author of The Rise of the West; in Vancouver, Canada (d. 2016)
  - Evan Mackie, New Zealand air force officer, commander of the No. 92 and No. 80 Squadron during World War II, recipient of the Distinguished Service Order and two Distinguished Flying Crosses from both the United Kingdom and United States; in Waihi, New Zealand (d. 1986)
  - Gordon Steege, Australian air force officer, held various commands during World War II including No. 3 Squadron, recipient of the Distinguished Service Order and the Distinguished Flying Cross; in Chatswood, New South Wales, Australia (d. 2013)
