= Mahiwa =

Mahiwa can mean:

- Mahiwa (マヒワ) the Japanese name for Carduelis spinus, also known as the Eurasian siskin
- Mahiwa, Tanzania, a populated place
  - Battle of Mahiwa fought in 1917
