= John Franklin Botume =

John Franklin Botume as an older man.

John Franklin Botume (November 21, 1855 – October 17, 1917) was a singer, choir director and vocal pedagogist. He is the author of several books on singing including Modern Singing Methods: Their Use and Abuse (1885).

== Life and career ==
John Franklin Botume was born in Boston, Massachusetts on November 21, 1855, to Elizabeth Augusta (Lord) Botume and John Botume Jr., a successful businessman with the Baldwin, Botume & Co. packing company. John Franklin was the only son and had two sisters. Coming from a well-to-do family, Frank (as he frequently went by) attended the Boston Latin School and then entered Harvard College. While Frank's parents had him cut out for a career in law, he started deviating from their plans and began pursuing singing. He studied many years under the Italian voice teacher Vincenzo Cirillo.

John Franklin Botume as a young man.

After graduating from Harvard in 1876, he attended Harvard Law School for a year and he later taught music in Boston and Cambridge as he read law. In 1881 Frank was admitted to the Suffolk County Bar and began dividing his time between practicing law and teaching the music he enjoyed. Finally, four years later, Frank broke for good with the law profession and dedicated all of his time to singing.

For the rest of his life, Frank was heavily involved in both teaching and performing music in and around Boston and New York City. In 1883 he was listed in the Boston Musical Yearbook as the director and accompanist of the "Gounod Quartet" and a bass singer in the "Cecilia" Club. During the summers of 1889 and 1891, he traveled to Paris, London and Munich to study with well-known singing teachers.

From 1891 to 1892 Frank was the resident director of the Boston branch of the American Academy of the Dramatic Arts, and from 1892 to 1893 Principal of the opera department of American Academy of Dramatic Arts in New York City. Soon after, he left that position to become the choirmaster at the historic St. James Church Episcopal Church in Roxbury, a post he would hold for 20 years. There, his duties included training and directing the vested choir and soloist quartet. All the time, he continued to teach voice privately.

About a year prior to his death, Frank retired from his job as choirmaster, continuing to teach privately. By this time he had lost one eye due to a fishing accident and was in poor health. The accident occurred sometime before 18 June 1891, which was the date of Frank's U.S. Passport application listing that he had "1 artificial eye". John Franklin Botume died suddenly of a hemorrhage October 17, 1917 in Boston at age 61. He was never married nor had any children.

== Modern Singing Methods ==
In his Modern Singing Methods, John Franklin Botume was perhaps the first published vocal pedagogue to bridge the substantial gap between the "old Italian school" and the "modern school" of singing, showing the strengths and weaknesses of each method alone and how they could support each other combined. Botume believed that one great strength of the "old Italian school" is its regimen of developing the voice over a long period of training and exercise. He also found this to be a weakness in the "modern school" training:

The teacher of the future will […] follow the old process. He will attempt little the first or the second year, and will go gradually, carefully, regularly and, above all, slowly to the end. […] Nature is a hard task-mistress. What you steal from her today, she will exact with compound interest tomorrow. The end of these "short-cuts" is, that every quick result which the pupil gains is attended either with some physical weakness or disease, or else with an accompanying fault; such as a tremolo, a tendency to sing "off the key," a nasal, sharp, foggy, hard or weak tone, a lack of flexibility, a premature decay of the voice, or some other disagreeable thing, which, like Banquo's ghost, is apt to pop up at the very moment you wish to display yourself on some festal occasion.

Another strength Botume identified of the "old" method is its viewpoint on what the singer feels. While modern science can tell us what a good singer's vocal folds are doing while they are singing, it has been at a loss to help inexperienced singers achieve the same technique. In the "old Italian school", singers would listen to the proper execution of a vocalization and attempt to emulate it. The teacher would then use their experienced ears to inform the student when they had achieved the desired results and the student would memorize the sensations accompanying the correct technique. Botume recommends that this process be continued in modern voice training, describing five different vocal registers by the region of the body they are felt to vibrate.

Botume did not, however, discount the "modern school" completely. Indeed, he praised it for bringing a level of "intellectualism" into singing, allowing a method of scientifically based techniques to be taught ("how to sing"), whereas in the "old Italian school" only the desired results were taught ("what one should sound like"). He also praised the "modern school" for dispelling the myth that voice teachers possess some mystical power for transforming common voices into magnificent ones:

It cannot be too strongly insisted that the art of singing is not an occult thing. It is very much like the carpenter's trade: one must have some aptitude for it to begin with; next he must learn how to use the tools of his craft; finally, he must acquire mechanical dexterity by practice.

Botume's Modern Singing Methods is a ground-breaking work that held influence over several later vocal pedagogical works. In his Psychology of Singing (MacMillan, 1917), David Taylor said:

Probably the best summary of the old Italian method offered by any modern teacher is contained in a little booklet by J. Frank Botume, entitled Modern Singing Methods. […] This sums up beautifully the external aspects of the old Italian method, and of modern methods as well.

The work was also cited in Resonance in Singing and Speaking by Thomas Fille-Brown (Oliver Ditson & Co, 1911), as well as the modern books Secrets of Singing by Jeffry Allen (Alfred, 1994, 2005) and The Singer's Companion by Brent Monahan (Limelight Editions, 2007).

== Works ==
- Modern Singing Methods, Their Use and Abuse (1885, Reissued 2009 Bel Canto Masters Series, Pitch Perfect Publishing)
- Exercises in Vocal Technique (1894)
- Respiration for Advanced Singers (1897)
- Voice Production Today (1916)

Botume also published several songs for both solo voice and choir, including "Morning Love Song" (1896) and "The Trill," (date unknown), and an arrangement of scenes from the earliest opera still extant, Jacopo Peri's Euridice (1895).

== Sources ==
Text for this article has been excerpted by permission of the author from the introduction to J. F. Botume Modern Singing Methods, Bel Canto Masters Study Series (Pitch Perfect Publishing, 2009). ISBN 978-0-557-17314-3.
