= 1917 Maltese general election =

General elections were held in Malta on 20 and 21 October 1917. Two of the eight elected seats were left uncontested.

== Background ==
The elections were held under the Chamberlain Constitution, with members elected from eight single-member constituencies by first-past-the-post voting.

District	Towns
I	Valletta East
II	Valletta West, Msida, Sliema, St. Julian's
III	Floriana, Pietà, Ħamrun, Qormi, Żebbuġ
IV	Cospicua, Birgu, Kalkara, Żabbar, Marsaskala
V	Senglea, New Village, Luqa, Gudja, Għaxaq, Żejtun, Marsaxlokk, Saint George's Bay and Birżebbuġa
VI	Birkirkara, Balzan, Lija, Attard, Għargħur, Naxxar, Mosta, Mellieħa
VII	Mdina, Rabat, Siġġiewi, Dingli, Qrendi, Mqabba, Żurrieq, Bubaqra, Safi, Kirkop
VIII	Gozo and Comino
Source: Schiavone, p17

== Results ==
A total of 7,012 people were registered to vote.

Constituency	Name	Votes	Notes
I	Andrè Pullicino	353	
II	Giov. Gabaretta	288	
III	Antonio Dalli	–	Re-elected unopposed
IV	G Felice Inglott	–	Unopposed
V	Giovanni Bencini	352	
VI	Giuseppe Vassallo	257	
VII	Giuseppe Zammit	253	
VIII	Enrico Mizzi	560	
Source: Schiavone, p183
