= Dubno Garrison Revolt =

Dubno Garrison Revolt was an armed insurgency of the garrison of Dubno, Ukraine on 3-4 October (20-21 September) 1917.

== Events ==
Situated in the region of Volhynia, the city was in an epicenter of the Eastern European theater of World War I and in very close proximity to frontlines.

The reason for the revolt was anti-war moods, while the direct cause was court trials of the protesters who participated in fraternization and anti-war soldier's unrest. In Dubno under investigation were 11 officers and around 500 soldiers. The arrested were threatened with severe punishment.

The revolt started by prisoners immediately inside the military courtroom. The insurgents were supported by the 3rd Rail Battalion and 404th Kamyshin Regiment and soon captured the city. Although the uprising was defeated, it activated a peasant movement near Brody and Dubno.
