= Battle of Mahiwa =

1917 battle of the East African campaign

- Part of East African campaign (World War I)
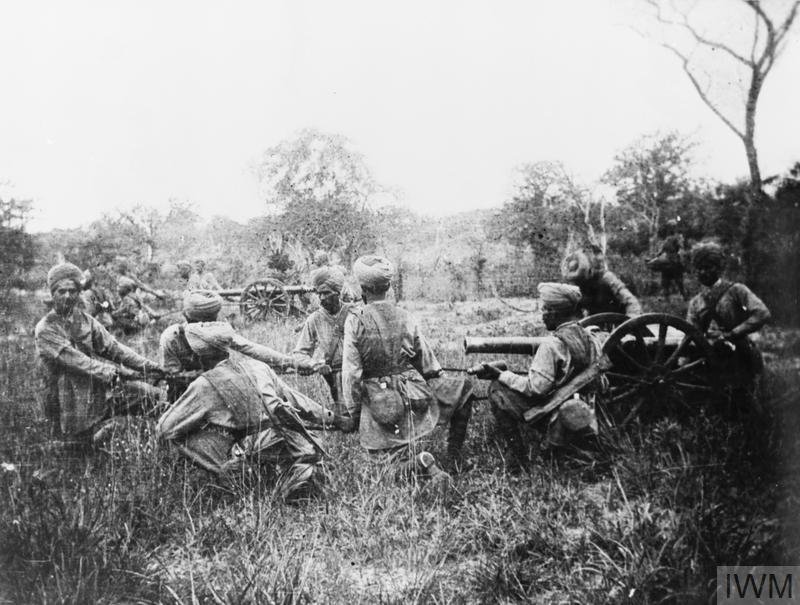
- Indian mountain battery in action at Nyangao against Mahiwa
Date	15–18 October 1917
Location	Mahiwa, Lindi, German East Africa 10°20′20″S 39°16′00″E
Result	Indecisive

Belligerents
German Empire: German East Africa	British Empire: India; Nigeria; South Africa

Commanders and leaders
(German Empire) Paul Emil von Lettow-Vorbeck (German Empire) Kurt Wahle	(Union of South Africa) Sir Jacob van Deventer

Strength
3,000 men	5,000–6,000 men

Casualties and losses
500–600 killed and wounded	2,700 killed and wounded
- Location within Tanzania Battle of Mahiwa (Africa)

The Battle of Mahiwa between German and British Imperial forces was fought during the East African Campaign of World War I, when South African and Nigerian troops under Lieutenant General Jacob van Deventer engaged a column under German General Paul Emil von Lettow-Vorbeck, at Mahiwa in German East Africa. The Germans inflicted substantial casualties upon Van Deventer's army, forcing it to withdraw. However, the Germans lost a large percentage of their forces, and were ultimately forced to withdraw from their positions and continue their guerrilla war. The battle was noted by the British Official History as the "most disastrous day for the Nigerian Army since the formation of the force" and was called "the most savage battle in the history of African conflict-not excluding Omdurman or any engagement of the Boer War."

== Background ==
With Kurt Wahle's force at Nyangao separated from Lettow-Vorbeck's main body, the British hatched a plan to cut off and surround Wahle's column by flanking it with a force of Nigerians. They would then commit a large body of soldiers on a frontal attack and encircle the force.

== Battle ==
A force of three battalions of Nigerians was sent against Wahle's troops at Nyangao and engaged him there on the 15th. Von Lettow-Vorbeck brought up reinforcements to Wahle and pitted his additional four companies against them. The Nigerians were soon threatened with encirclement and suffered severe casualties. A larger force had been sent by the British to attack the Germans from the opposite side, but this was also met with stubborn resistance when the Germans withdrew from Nyangao on the 16th and dug in on the ridge at Mahiwa 2 miles (3.2 km) from their previous position. Despite the attacks from the newly arrived British force, the Germans were able to hold their ground and counter-attacked on the 17th and 18th forcing the British to withdraw with heavy casualties.

== Aftermath ==
The British forces suffered heavy losses, taking over 2,700 casualties, and were forced to withdraw. Although Von Lettow-Vorbeck had inflicted the greatest number of casualties on the Allies in the African Theater since the Battle of Tanga, the battle did not go as well as he had hoped. The German losses of 500 to 600 casualties were over thirty percent of their force engaged. German supplies were extremely limited and four days of fighting had expended over 850,000 rounds, nearly his entire supply of smokeless cartridges. Without sufficient ammunition for their modern weapons, the German force was reduced to using old Mauser Model 1871s which used black powder cartridges. Low on supplies and fearing another assault, General von Lettow-Vorbeck decided to withdraw from German East Africa and launch an invasion of Portuguese East Africa, where he hoped to regain strength by capturing supplies from the ill-prepared Portuguese Army there.
