= Mahiwa, Tanzania =

Human settlement in Tanzania

Coordinates: 10°20′30″S 39°16′06″E

Mahiwa is a place in Tanzania. It is located in the Lindi Rural District of the Lindi Region.

== See also ==
- Battle of Mahiwa
