= July 1917 =

Month in 1917

<<	July 1917					>>
Su	Mo	Tu	We	Th	Fr	Sa
1	2	3	4	5	6	7
8	9	10	11	12	13	14
15	16	17	18	19	20	21
22	23	24	25	26	27	28
29	30	31

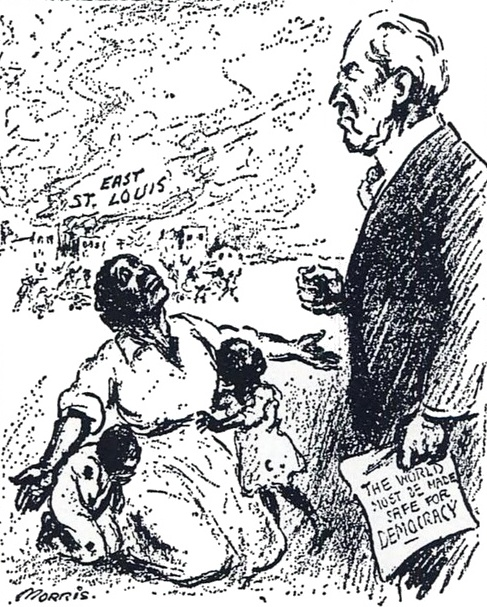
Political cartoon about the East St. Louis massacre of 1917. The caption reads, "Mr. President, why not make America safe for democracy?", referring to President Woodrow Wilson's catch-phrase "The world must be made safe for democracy" (shown on the document he holds).

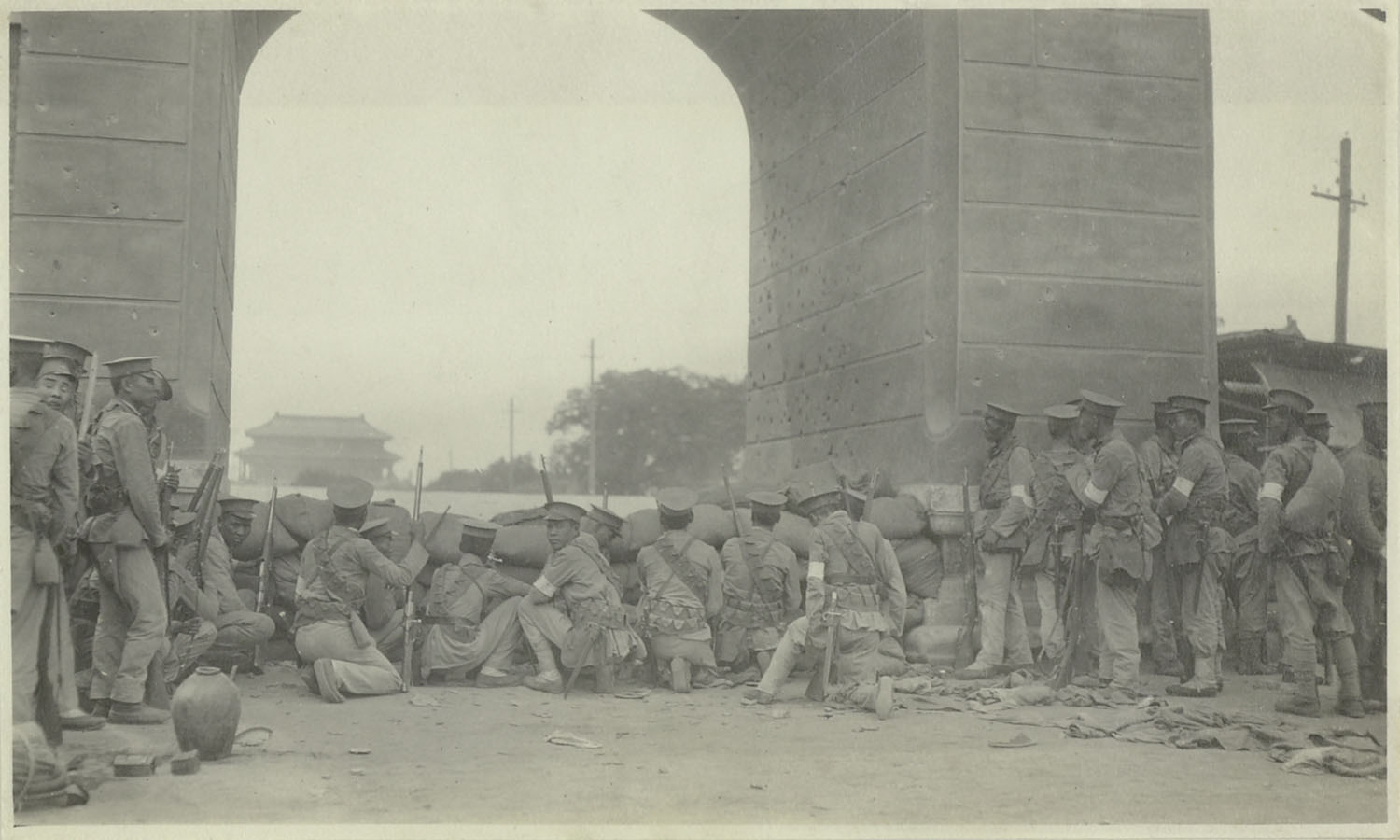
Federal troops at the Forbidden City in Beijing following an attempt to restore the monarchy in China.

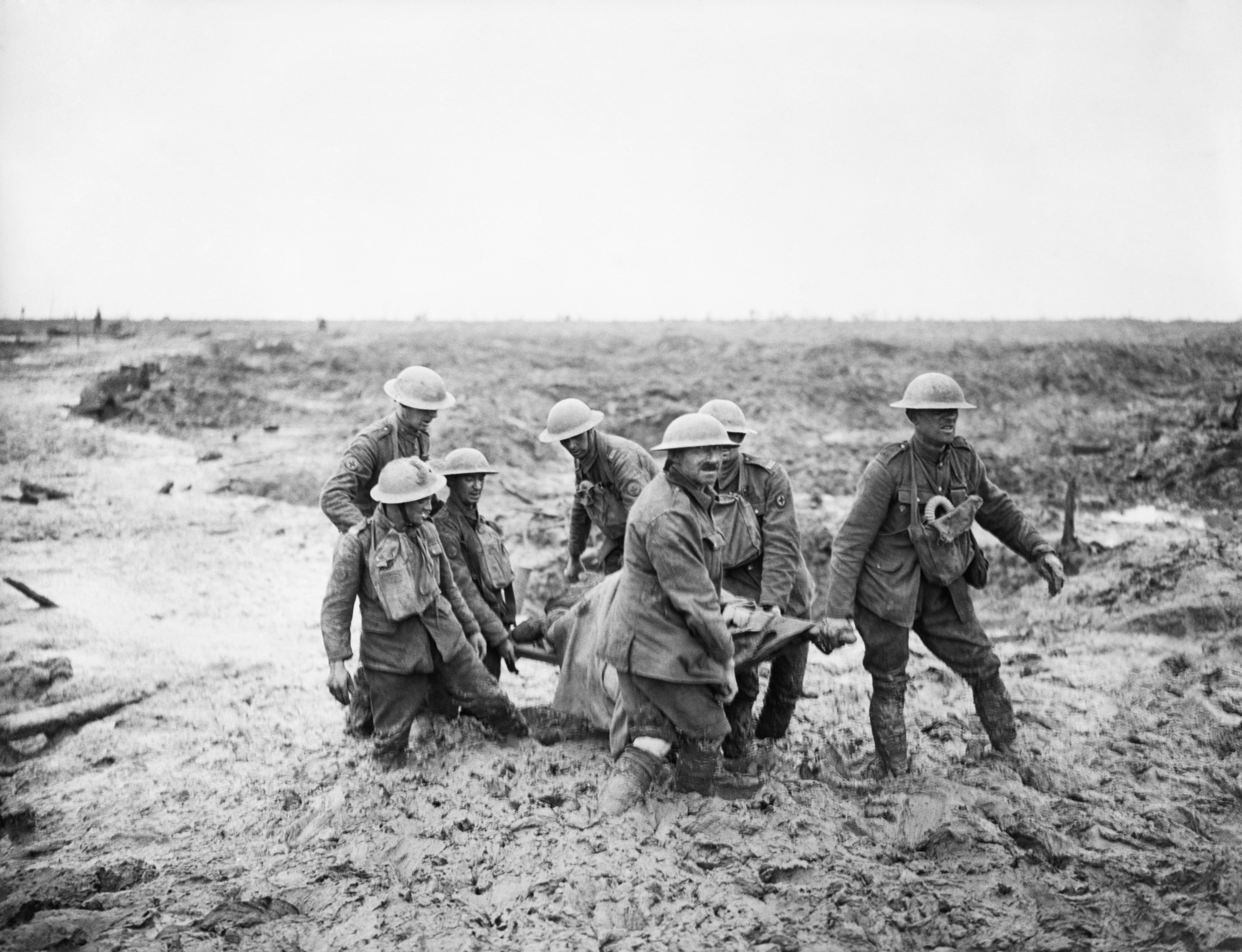
British stretcher bearers carry a wounded man during the first day of the Battle of Passchendaele.

The following events occurred in July 1917:

== July 1, 1917 (Sunday) ==
The first of five Cottingley Fairies photographs taken by Elsie Wright, showing playmate Frances Griffiths with "fairies".

- Canada celebrated its 50th Dominion Day, which was also the second time festivities were organized by the Government of Canada since its official proclamation in 1879 (celebrations prior to were organized locally).
- Kerensky offensive – Russian General Aleksei Brusilov ordered the 7th, 8th and 11th Russian Armies to attack 18 miles (29 km) of the Austro-German line in Galicia in what became the last major Russian military campaign of World War I.
- Over 500,000 anti-war protesters organized by the Congress of Soviets gathered in Petrograd to oppose renewed military offensive against the Central Powers.
- Manchu Restoration – General Zhang Xun, a supporter of the Qing dynasty, marched his army into Beijing and announced the restoration of the monarchy with Puyi as Emperor.
- The Royal Flying Corps established air squadrons No. 72, No. 73, and No. 74.
- The first Cottingley Fairies photographs were taken in Yorkshire, England, a hoax not admitted to by the child creators Elsie Wright and Frances Griffiths until 1981.
- Born:
  - Humphry Osmond, British psychiatrist, advocate for the use of psychedelic drugs in treatment; in Surrey, England (d. 2004)
  - Bob Artley, American cartoonist, best known for news daily editorial cartoons including Memories of a Former Kid; as George Robert Artley, in Franklin County, Iowa, United States (d. 2011)

== July 2, 1917 (Monday) ==
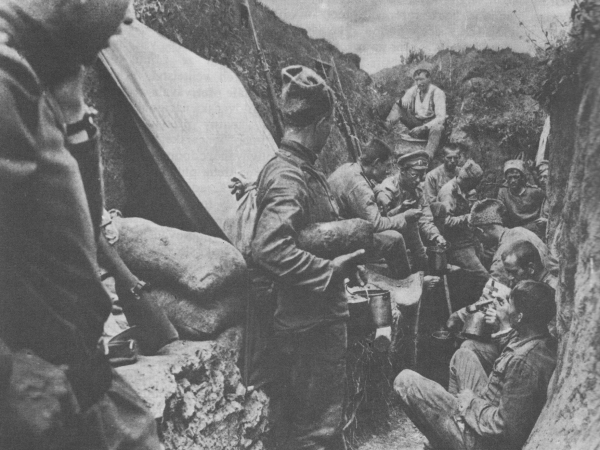
Soldiers with the Czechoslovak Legion in the trenches during the Battle of Zboriv in Eastern Europe.

- Greece joined the war on the side of the Allies.
- Battle of Zboriv – A Russian force composed mostly of 3,530 Czechoslovak volunteers broke through the trench line held by 5,500 Austro-Hungarian soldiers at Zboriv, Galicia, taking 3,300 men prisoner including 62 officers and 20 guns. The Czechoslovak brigade sustained roughly 900 casualties, including 167 dead and 700 wounded.
- East St. Louis massacre – A massive race riot erupted in the predominantly black city of East St. Louis, Illinois, resulting in at least 48 deaths (although some accounts put the death toll between 100 and 200 people). Thousands of white St. Louis citizens entered the town and began burning homes, leaving 6,000 people homeless. The riot was reprisal for the shooting deaths of two police detectives, who were driving a car that was mistaken for a similar vehicle earlier that opened fire on East St. Louis residents.
- Battle of Aqaba – An Arab rebel force led by Sheikh Auda Abu Tayi and supported by British army officer T. E. Lawrence attacked an Ottoman military station between Ma'an and Aqaba in what is now Jordan, killing 300 Turkish soldiers and taking another 300 prisoner. Lawrence was nearly killed in the fighting when he accidentally shot his own camel mount, but was thrown out of harm's way.
- Bisbee Deportation – Sheriff Harry C. Wheeler of Cochise County, Arizona was declined for requested troops to help break up a strike at Copper Queen Mine near Bisbee, Arizona.
- Born:
  - Leonard J. Arrington, American historian, founder of the Mormon History Association; in Twin Falls, Idaho, United States (d. 1999)
  - Harry E. Claiborne, American judge, presided for the United States District Court for the District of Nevada from 1978 to 1986, first judge to be impeached and sent to prison; in McRae, Arkansas, United States (d. 2004)
  - Ernest S. Tierkel, American physician, campaigned for the eradication of rabies in the United States; in Philadelphia, United States (d. 1981)
  - Murry Wilson, American music producer, first manager of The Beach Boys and father to band members Brian, Dennis, and Carl Wilson and uncle to Mike Love, owner of music publisher Sea of Tunes, producer of the album The Many Moods of Murry Wilson; in Hutchinson, Kansas, United States (d. 1973)
- Died:
  - William Holmes, 54, Australian army officer, commander of the Australian 4th Division during the Battle of Messines; killed in action (b. 1862)
  - Herbert Beerbohm Tree, 64, British actor, best known for stage performances and managing work with Her/His Majesty's Theatre (b. 1852)

== July 3, 1917 (Tuesday) ==
- Kerensky offensive – German and Austro-Hungarian forces fell back to Lemberg, Galicia.
- Manchu Restoration – Deposed Chinese president Li Yuanhong fled the presidential palace and took refuge in the French and later Japanese diplomatic districts of Beijing.
- Born: Benjamin Abramowitz, American artist, member of the Expressionism movement in the United States; in New York City, United States (d. 2011)

== July 4, 1917 (Wednesday) ==
- The United States Navy established Naval Station Norfolk in Norfolk, Virginia, with 34,000 enlisted men at the base the following year.
- The Public Auditorium (now Keller Auditorium) in Portland, Oregon, opened to the public with its first concert by the Portland Symphony Orchestra held the following day.
- Born: Manolete, Spanish bullfighter, considered one of the great bullfighters in the world; as Manuel Laureano Rodríguez Sánchez, in Córdoba, Spain (d. 1947, killed during competition)
- Died: Ivan Orlov, 22, Russian air force officer, commander of Escadrille 3, recipient of the Croix de Guerre, author of Ways to Conduct an Air Combat (b. 1895)

== July 5, 1917 (Thursday) ==
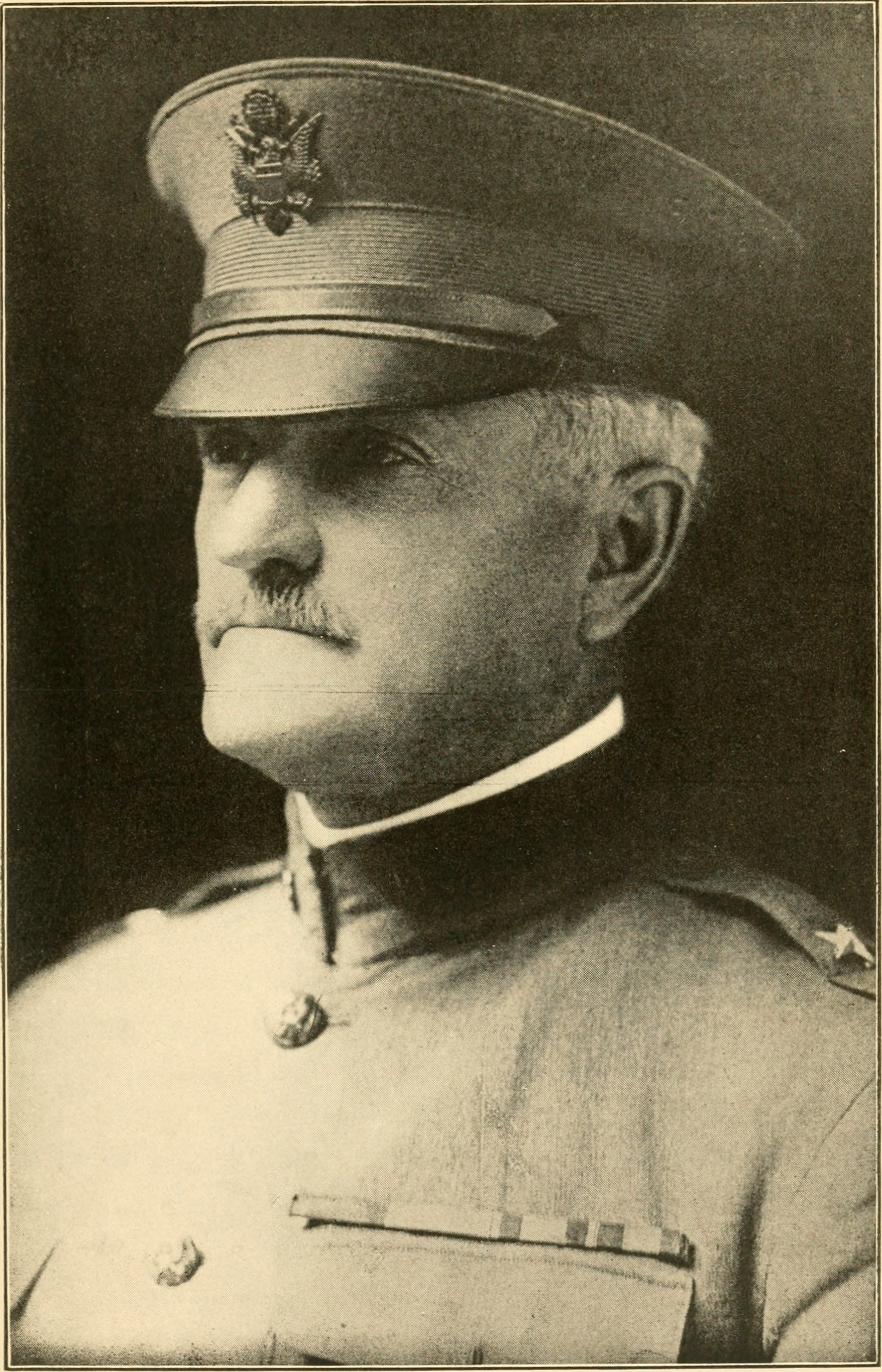
American Expeditionary Forces Commander in Chief, General John J. Pershing.

- The American Expeditionary Forces were established under the command of General John J. Pershing to support the other Allied forces against the German Empire in World War I. The initial force was 14,000 but by 1918 over a million American soldiers were stationed in Europe.
- Manchu Restoration – Duan Qirui, warlord and former Premier of the Republic of China, ordered his troops to seize the Beijing-Tianjin railway 40 kilometers outside the Chinese capital. At the same time, General Zhang Xun, leader of the Manchu Restoration, met overwhelming opposition from the entire Chinese northern army and was forced to give up to more railways leading to Beijing.
- Unrest in Amsterdam caused by wartime food shortages ended violently when government troops fired into a crowd of protesters, killing nine people and injuring 114.
- German submarine SM UC-7 was last sighted in the North Sea before it went missing. It was believed it struck a mine and sank with all 18 crew on board.
- Bisbee Deportation – A striker at the Copper Queen Mine struck the president of Phelps Dodge (which owned the mine) during an altercation in Jerome, Arizona, instigating a reprisal on all strikers.
- The British Fairey float plane made its first test flight.
- Born: Stella Sierra, Panamanian poet, known for poetry collections including Sinfonía Jubilosa en doce sonetos; in Aguadulce District, Panama (d. 1997)

== July 6, 1917 (Friday) ==
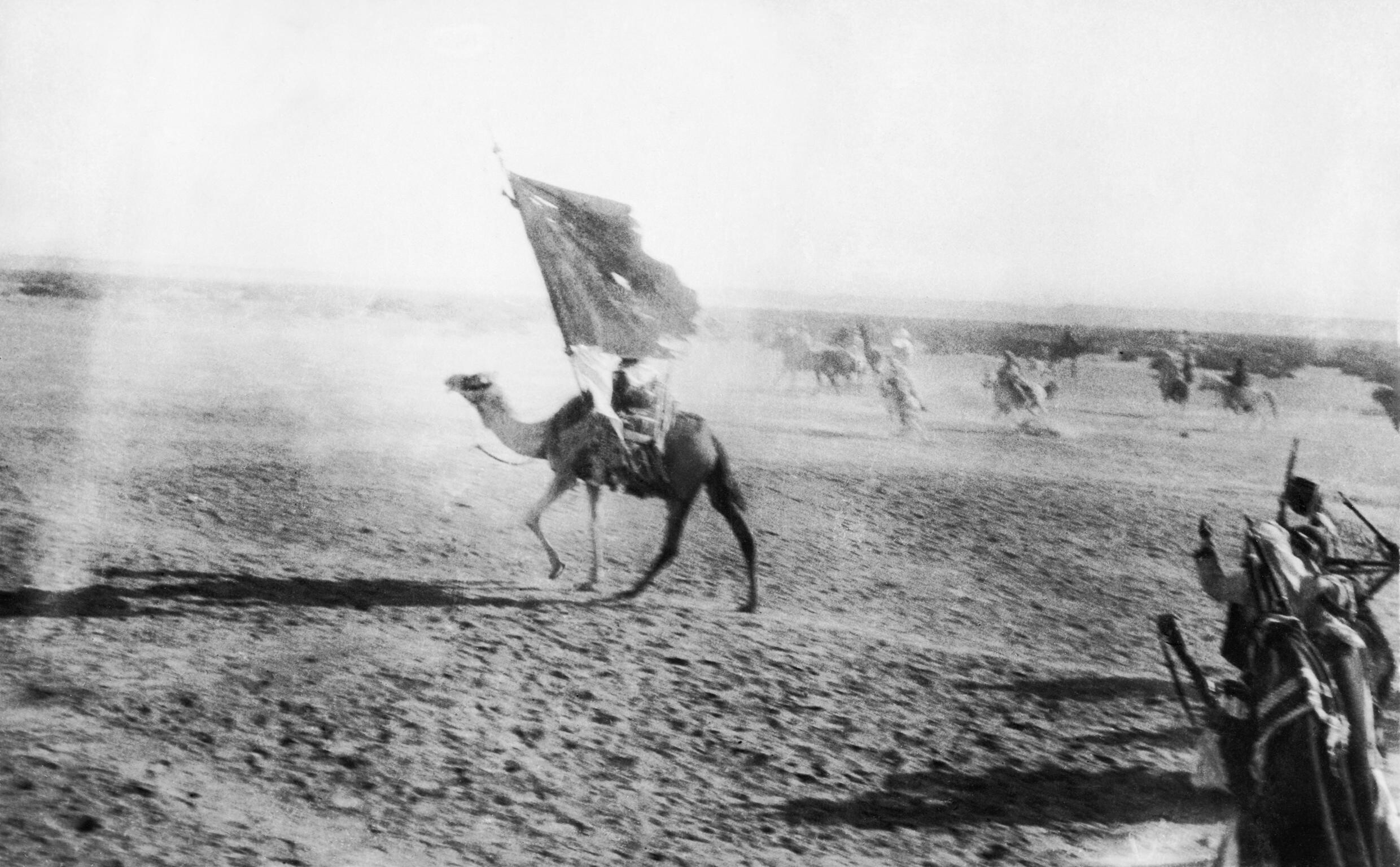
A flag bearer mounted on a camel leads the triumphal entry into Arabian port of Aqaba.

- Battle of Aqaba – An Arab rebel force of 5,000 men led by Sheikh Auda Abu Tayi and supported by British army officer T. E. Lawrence and the Royal Navy captured the port of Aqaba from the Ottoman Empire with little resistance, opening a pathway for further military operations into Syria and Jordan.
- Royal Navy destroyer HMS Itchen was torpedoed and sunk in the North Sea by German submarine SM UC-44 with the loss of eight of her 70 crew.
- The National Party of the United States was formed during a meeting with members of the Progressive Party and pro-war defectors of the Socialist Party of America.
- The Bhandarkar Oriental Research Institute was established in Pune, Maharashtra, India to collect and preserve manuscripts in Sanskrit and Prakrit languages.
- Born:
  - Albert L. Lewis, American religious leader, president of the Rabbinical Assembly from 1988 to 1990, subject of the Mitch Albom book Have a Little Faith; in New York City, United States (d. 2008)
  - Arthur Lydiard, New Zealand runner and athletics coach, coached New Zealand athletes Murray Halberg, Barry Magee and Peter Snell to medal wins at the 1960 Summer Olympics, recipient of the Order of the British Empire; in Auckland, New Zealand (d. 2004)
- Died: James Conlin, 35, English football player, outside forward for clubs including Manchester City from 1899 to 1914, member of the England national football team in 1906; killed in action (b. 1881)

== July 7, 1917 (Saturday) ==
- The fourth raid of Operation Türkenkreuz ("Turk's Cross") occurred with 22 German Gotha bombers attacking London in broad daylight, killing 57 to 65 people and injuring 193 to 245 (sources differ on casualty totals). Around 100 British aircraft were scrambled to intercept the German bombers, shooting one down and damaging three others (the bombers also shot down two of the intercepting British aircraft).
- Royal Navy torpedo boat HMS J2 sank German submarine SM U-99 in the North Sea, killing all 40 crew.
- The All-Russian Central Executive Committee was elected at the conclusion of the first All-Russian Congress of Soviets.
- Born:
  - Larry O'Brien, American politician and sports executive, 57th United States Postmaster General, third Commissioner of the National Basketball Association; as Lawrence Francis O'Brien Jr., in Springfield, Massachusetts, United States (d. 1990)
  - Fidel Sánchez Hernández, Salvadoran state leader, 35th President of El Salvador; in El Divisadero, El Salvador (d. 2003)
  - Red Sovine, American country musician, best known for truck-driving songs including "Giddyup Go" and "Teddy Bear"; as Woodrow Wilson Sovine, in Charleston, West Virginia, United States (d. 1980)

== July 8, 1917 (Sunday) ==
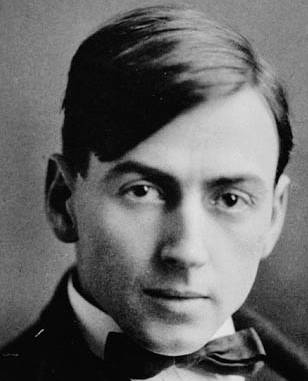
Canadian artist Tom Thomson

- First Battle of Ramadi – Lieutenant General Stanley Maude, commander of British forces in Mesopotamia (now Iraq), ordered a column in Fallujah to drive a force of 1,000 Ottoman troops out of a garrison in Ramadi in order to relieve Ottoman military pressure on a British-held dam that supplied drinking water to Baghdad. However, a record heat wave saw recorded temperatures of 71 °C (160 °F) in direct sun, making conditions intolerable for British troops.
- Canadian artist Tom Thomson disappeared while on a boating trip on Canoe Lake in Algonquin Provincial Park, Ontario shortly after he completed the painting The West Wind. His body was found eight days later with the official cause of death to be drowning. The mysterious circumstances around his disappearance and death led to several conspiracy theories including his body being switched with a local indigenous male (as outlined in the book The Tom Thomson Mystery by Canadian judge William T. Little).
- Born:
  - Faye Emerson, American talk show host, credited as "The First Lady of Television" for her talk and variety shows including Faye Emerson's Wonderful Town and Author Meets the Critics; in Elizabeth, Louisiana, United States (d. 1983)
  - J. F. Powers, American writer, author of the novels Morte d'Urban and Wheat that Springeth Green; as James Farl Powers, in Jacksonville, Illinois, United States (d. 1999)
  - Mikhail Devyataev, Soviet air force officer, known for his escape from the German concentration camp on Usedom in the Baltic Sea, recipient of the Order of Lenin and Hero of the Soviet Union; in Torbeyevo, Russian Empire (present-day Russia) (d. 2002)

== July 9, 1917 (Monday) ==
- Royal Navy battleship HMS Vanguard exploded and sank in Scapa Flow, killing 843 of the 845 men on board, including Japanese naval officer Kyōsuke Eto who was on board as a military observer.
- Manchu Restoration – General Zhang Xun, leader of the Manchu Restoration, resigned from all his government positions except for his command of military forces in Beijing, while the Chinese Imperial Court secretly worked out negotiations for the abdication of Emperor Puyi.
- A single British Handley Page bomber flown by squadron commander Kenneth Savory attacked the battleship SMS Goeben at anchor in Constantinople, a mission that won him the Distinguished Flying Cross.
- Australian activist Margaret Thorp, along with 20 members of the Women's Peace Army (WPA), disrupted a meeting of 300 members with the Women's Compulsory Service Petition League at the Brisbane School of Arts. The league was in favor of conscription in Australia while the WPA was against it. The resulting disruption devolved into brawling at least three times before Thorp was permanently barred from the meeting.
- U.S. military air case Joy Aviation Field was established, the precursor to the Selfridge Air National Guard Base, in Harrison Township, Michigan. It was there the 40th and 41st Aero Squadrons were officially established.
- Irving Berlin published the sheet music for the patriotic war song "For Your Country and My Country" through Waterson, Berlin & Snyder, Inc. Bandleader Patrick Conway later released a recording of the song under the Victor record label.
- Born:
  - Kay Aldridge, American actress, best known for roles in film serials including Perils of Nyoka; as Katharine Gratten Aldridge, in Tallahassee, Florida, United States (d. 1995)
  - Ted Steele, American jazz conductor, best known for The Ted Steele Show radio and television programs popular in the 1940s and 1950s; in Hartford, Connecticut, United States (d. 1985)
  - Frank Wayne, American television producer, original executive producer of The Price Is Right; as Rocco Francis Rossi Jr., in Boston, United States (d. 1988)
- Died: Seldon Connor, 78, American politician, 35th Governor of Maine (b. 1839)

== July 10, 1917 (Tuesday) ==
- Germany spoiled a British attempt to gain control of the mouth of the river Yser in Belgium to secure beachheads for a planned amphibious landing code-named Operation Hush.
- Bisbee Deportation – Mining authorities with Phelps Dodge, along with over 250 local businessmen of Jerome, Arizona, arrested without cause and jailed over 100 suspected members of the Industrial Workers of the World, forcing 67 men later that day out of the town.
- Éamon de Valera of Sinn Féin beat Patrick Lynch, an Irish Parliamentary Party Home Rule candidate, in the East Clare by-election caused by the death on active service of Willie Redmond."
- American cargo ship City of Washington ran aground along with two other vessels on a shallow reef near Key Largo in the Florida Keys. The other two, a barge and tugboat, were salvaged but the cargo ship remained a wreck.
- Born:
  - Don Herbert, American television personality, better known as Mr. Wizard on science education shows for youth including Watch Mr. Wizard; as Donald Herbert Kemske, in Waconia, Minnesota, United States (d. 2007)
  - Dayton S. Mak, American diplomat, first United States Ambassador to Kuwait; in Sioux Falls, South Dakota, United States (d. 2018)
  - Reg Smythe, English cartoonist, creator of the Andy Capp comic strip; as Reginald Smyth, in Hartlepool, England (d. 1998)

== July 11, 1917 (Wednesday) ==
- Kerensky offensive – Russian forces captured Halicz, Galicia, putting them within striking distance of Lemberg.
- First Battle of Ramadi – A British column reached Ramadi north of Baghdad to drive out an Ottoman force of 1,000 men, but were slowed by defensive fire, an early morning dust storm, and intense heat that caused armored vehicles and airplanes to break down.
- Bisbee Deportation – Sheriff Harry C. Wheeler of Cochise County, Arizona organized a posse of 2,200 men from Bisbee, Arizona to round up and deport strikers from the Copper Queen Mine.
- The Yser Testament, also known as the "Open Letter to Albert I", was published by Flemish Movement sympathizers within the Belgian Army on the Yser Front, complaining to the Belgium monarchy about official discrimination against Dutch language.
- German submarine SM U-69 was last sighted off the coast of Norway and may have been sunken by the American destroyer HMS Patriot the following day with all 40 crew lost.
- The U.S. Marines established the 6th Marine Regiment for service in Europe.
- Died: Charles Horton Peck, 84, American botanist, leading researcher of North American indigenous plants, identifying over 2,700 native species of fungi (b. 1833)

== July 12, 1917 (Thursday) ==
Striking miners are forced at gunpoint by local posse onto a train leaving Cochise County, Arizona.

- Manchu Restoration – A counter-revolutionary attack led by Chinese vice-president Feng Guozhang and warlord Duan Qirui forced General Zhang Xun to flee, opening negotiations to restore the Republic of China.
- First Battle of Ramadi – Unable to organize any attack on open ground due to searing heat, British forces were forced to retreat during the night while hounded by a force of 1,500 pro-Turkish Arabs.
- Bisbee Deportation – A large posse from Cochise County, Arizona rounded up nearly 1,300 striking miners at Copper Queen Mine and forced them onto a train to Columbus, New Mexico.
- Royal Naval Air Service Flight Lieutenant O. A. Butcher, manning a kite balloon lofted by the destroyer HMS Patriot off Shetland, sighted a German submarine believed to have been SM U-69 at a range of 28 nautical miles (52 km), allowing Patriot to intercept U-69 and sink her with depth charges.
- The Royal Flying Corps No. 101 Squadron was formed.
- Born:
  - Andrew Wyeth, American painter, known for works including Christina's World and The Helga Pictures, recipient of the National Medal of Arts; in Chadds Ford Township, Delaware County, Pennsylvania, United States (d. 2009)
  - Luigi Gorrini, Italian fighter pilot, flying ace in the Battle of Britain with 19 credited kills, recipient of the Gold Medal of Military Valour; in Alseno, Kingdom of Italy (present-day Italy) (d. 2014)
  - Satyendra Narayan Sinha, Indian state leader, 23rd Chief Minister of Bihar; in Poiwan, British India (present-day India) (d. 2006)
- Died: Donald Cunnell, 23, British fighter pilot, one of the few pilots to shoot down and wound the Red Baron; killed in action (b. 1893)

== July 13, 1917 (Friday) ==
- First Battle of Ramadi – The British column returned to home base after intense heat prevented them from launching an attack on Ramadi west of Baghdad. The British suffered 566 casualties, with 321 – over half – caused by heat stroke, dehydration or exhaustion.
- The Regional State Archives in Hamar, Norway were established as part of the National Archival Services of Norway.
- Died:
  - Tom Cannon Sr., 71, British jockey, British flat racing Champion Jockey of 1872, father of Mornington Cannon (b. 1846)
  - James Dwight, 64, American tennis player, five-time champion of the US Open (b. 1852)

== July 14, 1917 (Saturday) ==
- Police in Washington, D.C. arrested 16 members of the suffragist protest group Silent Sentinels, including Alison Turnbull Hopkins, and Elizabeth Selden Rogers, and sentenced to 60 days in jail or pay a $25 fine. The women spent three days in Occoquan Workhouse, Virginia before they were pardoned by U.S. President Woodrow Wilson.
- Born:
  - Douglas Edwards, American news anchor, first leading anchor for CBS Evening News; as Clyde Douglas Edwards, in Ada, Oklahoma, United States (d. 1990)
  - Arthur Laurents, American playwright and screenwriter, best known for his Broadway hits West Side Story, Gypsy, and Hallelujah, Baby!; as Arthur Levine, in New York City, United States (d. 2011)
  - Nur Muhammad Taraki, Afghan state leader, third President of Afghanistan; in Nawa, Emirate of Afghanistan (present-day Afghanistan) (d. 1979, executed)
  - P. A. P. Moran, Australian mathematician, noted for applying probability to population and evolutionary genetics; as Patrick Alfred Pierce Moran, in Kings Cross, New South Wales, Australia (d. 1988)
  - Roshan, Indian composer, known for scoring many popular Bollywood films including Aarti, Taj Mahal, and Mamta, father to Rajesh and Rakesh Roshan; as Roshan Lal Nagrath, in Gujranwala, British India (present-day Pakistan) (d. 1967)
  - Frank Vigar, English cricketer, batsman and bowler for the Essex County Cricket Club from 1938 to 1954; in Bruton, England (d. 2004)
  - Ben Enwonwu, Nigerian artist, known for African-based art including works such as Portrait of Chief Candido Joao Da Rocha; as Odinigwe Benedict Chukwukadibia Enwonwu, in Onitsha, Colony and Protectorate of Nigeria (present-day Nigeria) (d. 1994)
- Died: Paul Petter Waldenström, 78, Swedish theologian, one of the founders of the Mission Covenant Church of Sweden and promoter of the free church movement in Sweden (b. 1838)

== July 15, 1917 (Sunday) ==
- Royal Navy messenger ship HMS Redbreast was torpedoed and sunk by German submarine SM UC-38 in the Aegean Sea, killing 44 crew.
- The United States Army established Camp Lee in Prince George County, Virginia, named after the Confederate military leader Robert E. Lee. It would become the permanent military base Fort Lee in 1946.
- Welsh poet Hedd Wyn posted his awdl "Yr Arwr" ("The Hero") as his entry for the poetry competition at the National Eisteddfod of Wales on the same day he marched off with the 15th Battalion of the Royal Welch Fusiliers to Belgium. He will be killed on the opening day of the Battle of Passchendaele two weeks later.
- The Brazilian football club Uberaba was established in Uberabão, Brazil.
- Born:
  - Robert Conquest, British historian, best known for his work on Soviet history, author of The Great Terror and The Harvest of Sorrow; in Great Malvern, England (d. 2015)
  - Walter S. Graf, American physician, pioneer in paramedic care in the United States; in New York City, United States (d. 2015)
  - Reidar Liaklev, Norwegian speed skater, gold medallist at the 1948 Winter Olympics; in Jaren, Norway (d. 2006)
- Died:
  - Florence Missouri Caton, 42, British nurse who served in Serbia during World War I (b. 1875).
  - Lemuel John Tweedie, 67, Canadian politician, 10th Premier of New Brunswick (b. 1849)

== July 16, 1917 (Monday) ==
- Kerensky offensive – German defenses halted the Russian advance in Galicia, sparing Lemberg.
- July Days – Spontaneous demonstrations of soldiers and industrial workers arose against the Russian Provisional Government in Petrograd in opposition to continue fighting against the Central Powers.
- The United States Army established the 27th Infantry Division.
- In the Bergen Incident ships of the Royal Navy intercept a convoy of ten German freighters off the coast of Bergen, North Holland. Four freighters are captured, one is beached. Several German merchant sailors are killed and shells land on the coast and well inland, causing damage. As the intercept took place in Dutch territorial waters in violation of Dutch neutrality, the Royal Netherlands Navy sortied from Den Helder and a diplomatic row ensued.
- Born: Bill Woodson, American voice actor, best known for his dramatic narration for the radio series This Is Your FBI and the DC Comics animated show Super Friends; as William T. Woodson, in Glendale, California, United States (d. 2017)
- Died: Philipp Scharwenka, 70, Polish-German composer and music instructor, best known for his tenure with the Musical Academy in Berlin (b. 1847)

== July 17, 1917 (Tuesday) ==
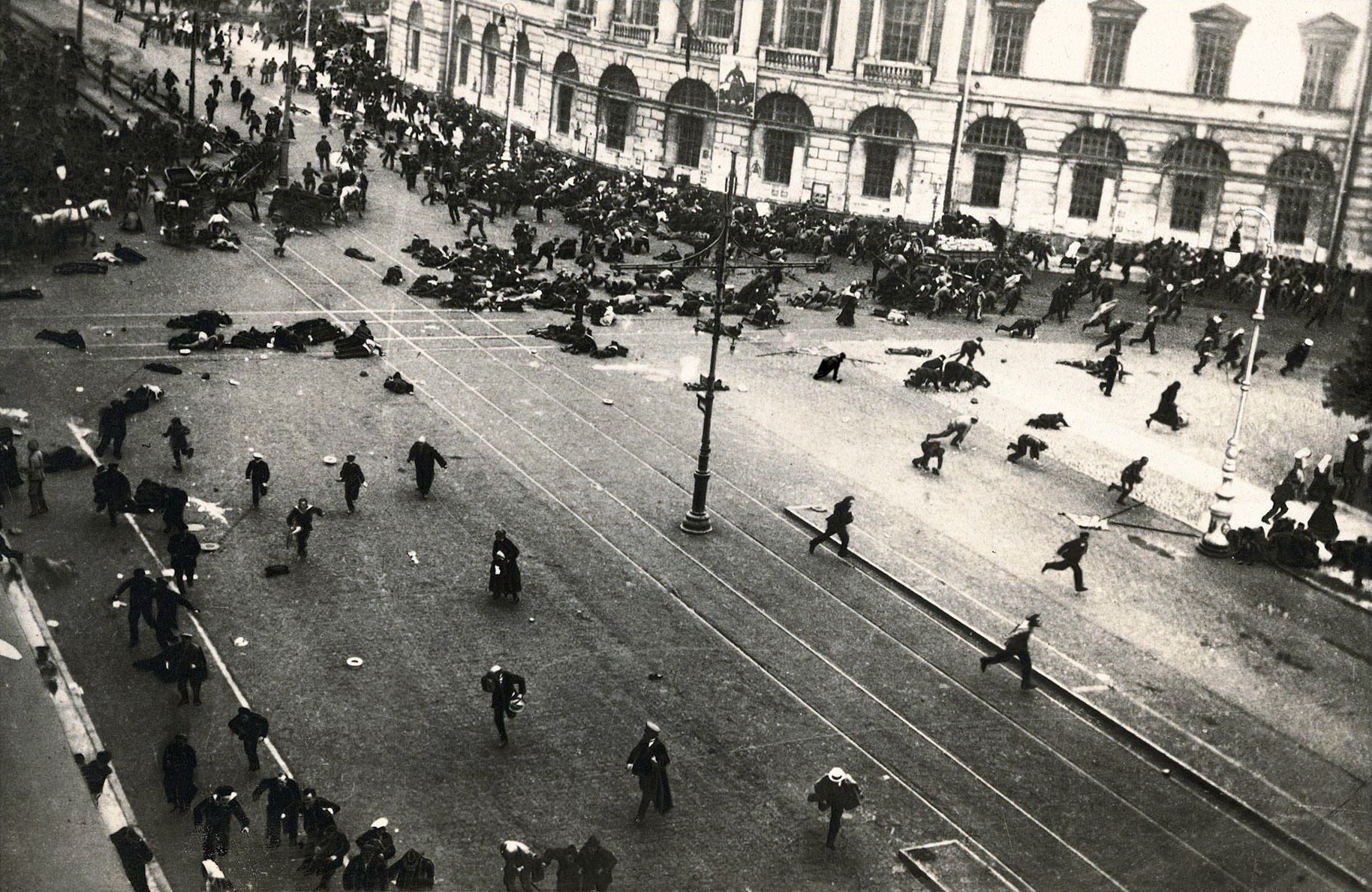
Russian troops open fire on demonstrators in Petrograd.

- July Days – A demonstration of half a million people led by the Bolsheviks in Petrograd was violently put down by troops sent by the Russian Provisional Government, resulting in 700 wounded, 160 killed and 100 arrested.
- Around 10,000 soldiers in Kiev began to mutiny as conditions further deteriorated on the Eastern Front.
- Li Yuanhong resigned from his position as President of the Republic of China and was succeeded by Feng Guozhang on August 1. It also allowed warlord Duan Qirui to regain his position as Premier of the Republic of China.
- Royal Navy minesweeper HMS Newmarket was torpedoed and sunk by German submarine SM UC-38 in the Aegean Sea with 44 crew killed.
- Royal Navy submarine HMS C34 was sunk by German submarine SM U-52 off Shetland, killing all but one of the 19 crew on board.
- King George of the United Kingdom issued a proclamation, stating the male line descendants of the British royal family will bear the surname Windsor in an effort to distance the Royal Family's relations with the German nobility.
- Winston Churchill was appointed Minister of Munitions as part of a cabinet shuffle within the David Lloyd George administration.
- The United States Navy established the Naval Aircraft Factory at League Island Navy Yard in Philadelphia.
- Born:
  - Gus Arriola, American comic strip artist, creator of Gordo; as Gustavo Arriola, in Florence, Arizona, United States (d. 2008)
  - Jack Beale, Australian politician, first minister of environment; in Manly, New South Wales, Australia (d. 2006)
  - Dmitry Belyayev, Russian biologist, director of the genetics department of the Soviet Academy of Science from 1959 to 1985, creator of the domesticated silver fox; in Protasovo, Russian Empire (present-day Russia) (d. 1985)
  - Lou Boudreau, American baseball player, shortstop and manager for the Cleveland Indians and Boston Red Sox from 1938 to 1952; as Louis Boudreau, in Harvey, Illinois, United States (d. 2001)
  - G. B. Caird, English theologian, author of The Truth of the Gospel and Principalities and Powers; as George Bradford Caird, in Wandsworth, London, England (d. 1984)
  - Phyllis Diller, American actress and comedian, credited as one of the pioneers in female stand-up comedy, also for roles in Splendor in the Grass and voice work for A Bug's Life and Family Guy; as Phyllis Ada Driver, in Lima, Ohio, United States (d. 2012)
  - Kenan Evren, Turkish state leader, 7th President of Turkey; as Ahmet Kenan Evren, in Alaşehir, Ottoman Empire (present-day Turkey) (d. 2015)
  - Silvestre S. Herrera, Mexican-American soldier, recipient of the Medal of Honor for action at Mertzwiller, France during World War II; in Camargo, Chihuahua, Mexico (d. 2007)

== July 18, 1917 (Wednesday) ==
- July Days – Government authorities raided and destroyed the Bolshevik Central Committee headquarters and the news office and printing plant of the Pravda newspaper, forcing the Bolsheviks to call off the street demonstrations.
- German submarine SM UC-1 disappeared and likely sank in the North Sea with 17 crew lost.
- The United States Army established the 26th, 29th, 32nd, 33rd, 36th, and 40th Infantry Divisions.
- Born:
  - Henri Salvador, French Caribbean singer, best known for his best-selling Caribbean jazz-style hit albums including Chambre avec vue, recipient of the Legion of Honour; in Cayenne, French Guiana (d. 2008)
  - Paul Streeten, Austrian-born British economist, best known for his research into development economics for low-income countries; as Paul Hornig, in Vienna, Austria-Hungary (present-day Austria) (d. 2019)

== July 19, 1917 (Thursday) ==
- Kerensky offensive – Austro-Hungarian and German forces counterattacked and broke through the Russian line in Galicia, pushing Russian forces back toward the Zbruch river.
- The Reichstag (German Parliament) passed a peace resolution by 212 to 126 votes in an attempt to open peace negotiations that would end World War I. However, it was opposed by conservative parties and groups and ignored by the German High Command and the Allies.
- British troopship SS Eloby was torpedoed and sunk by German submarine SM U-38 in the Mediterranean Sea, killing 156 people on board.
- July Days – The Russian Provisional Government ordered the arrest of Bolshevik leader Vladimir Lenin, who fled Petrograd to Finland. Other Bolshevik leaders were arrested, including Leon Trotsky, Lev Kamenev, and Anatoly Lunacharsky.
- A partial solar eclipse occurred over the Antarctic.
- Born:
  - William Scranton, American politician, 38th Governor of Pennsylvania; in Madison, Connecticut, United States (d. 2013)
  - Fulbert Youlou, Congolese state leader, 1st President of the Republic of the Congo; in Madibou, Moyen-Congo (d. 1972)

== July 20, 1917 (Friday) ==
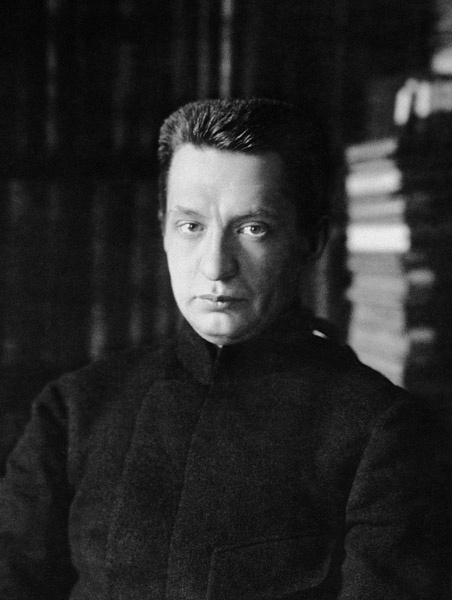
Alexander Kerensky, Premier of Russia

- The Corfu Declaration was signed by the Yugoslav Committee and the Kingdom of Serbia, setting in motion the process to form the Kingdom of Yugoslavia.
- The Parliament of Finland declared Finland a sovereign nation separate from the Russian Empire, a political move the Russian Provisional Government refused to recognize.
- Alexander Kerensky became premier of the Russian Provisional Government, replacing Prince Georgy Lvov.
- Kerensky offensive – The Russian offensive in Galicia began to collapse as thousands of soldiers deserted the trenches. Hundreds of mutinying soldiers were shot by their officers while retreating.
- July Days – Troops loyal to Russian Provisional Government occupied Petrograd, ending the unrest.
- The Russian Provisional Government enacted women's suffrage.
- The Roman Catholic Diocese of Brentwood was established in England.
- Swedish association football club Umeå was established in Umeå, Sweden. Initially a men's football club, the club was re-established in 1985 as a women's football club and has since won seven Swedish league championships, four Swedish Cups and two UEFA Women's Champions League titles.
- Born:
  - Józef Bartosik, Polish naval officer, destroyer command for the Polish Navy and Royal Navy during World War II, recipient of the Virtuti Militari, Cross of Valour and Distinguished Service Cross; in Topola Wielka, Poland (d. 2008)
  - Don Black, American baseball player, pitcher for the Philadelphia Athletics and Cleveland Indians from 1943 to 1948; as Donald Paul Black, in Salix, Iowa, United States (d. 1959)
- Died: Ignaz Sowinski, 58, Galician architect (b. 1858)

== July 21, 1917 (Saturday) ==
- British cargo liner SS Paddington was torpedoed and sunk by German submarine SM U-96 in the Atlantic Ocean, killing 29 people.
- The Henningson Engineering Company officially received its first contract, designing a power house for Ogallala, Nebraska. The engineering and architectural firm would grow to become HDR, Inc., which currently employs 10,000 people in 60 countries.
- Aircraft engine manufacturer Rapp Motorenwerke officially changed its name to Bayerische Motoren Werke AG, or BMW, following the departure of company founder Karl Rapp.
- Shoe retailer Bensonshoe was established in Leicester, England and would eventually evolve into the chain Shoe Zone.

== July 22, 1917 (Sunday) ==
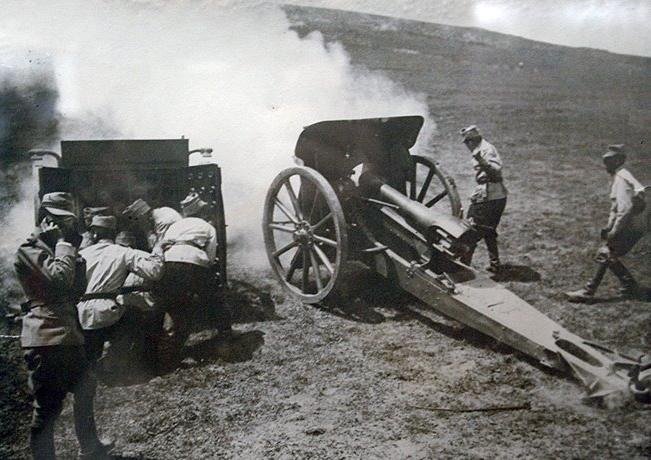
Romanian artillery firing during the Battle of Mărăști.

- Thailand declared war on the Central Powers.
- Battle of Mărăști – Russian and Romanian forces attempted to surround and destroy the German Ninth Army in eastern Romania.
- The fifth raid of Operation Türkenkreuz involved German Gotha bombers attacking Felixstowe and Harwich.
- Oath crisis – Polish army commander Józef Piłsudski and army chief of staff Kazimierz Sosnkowski of the 1st Brigade of the Polish Legions were arrested after instructing their troops not to take an oath swearing allegiance to Kaiser Wilhelm. Following their arrest, 1st and 3rd Brigade, which also joined in the insurrection, were disbanded.
- The United States Army established the 24th Aero Squadron.
- Saint Stephen's High School was established as a Christian secondary school for girls in Manila until 1963, when it was renamed to reflect it was now a co-ed institution.
- Born:
  - Adam Malik, Indonesian state leader, 3rd Vice President of Indonesia; as Adam Malik Batubara, in Pematangsiantar, Dutch East Indies (present-day Indonesia) (d. 1984)
  - H. Boyd Woodruff, American microbiologist, discovered dactinomycin which is used in chemotherapy and leading researcher into using fermentation to develop various natural-forming antibiotics; as Harold Boyd Woodruff, in Bridgeton, New Jersey, United States (d. 2017)

== July 23, 1917 (Monday) ==
- Russian forces retreated in the face of the Austro-Hungarian and German advance and gave up 240 kilometres (150 mi) of territory in Galicia, ending the Kerensky offensive with an estimated 60,000 casualties.
- Royal Navy armed merchant cruiser SS Otway was torpedoed and sunk by German submarine SM UC-49 in the Atlantic Ocean, with the loss of 10 of her crew.
- Born:
  - T. O. S. Benson, Nigerian politician, cabinet member of the first independent Nigerian government, creator of Voice of Nigeria; as Theophilus Owolabi Shobowale Benson, in Ikorodu, Colony and Protectorate of Nigeria (present-day Nigeria) (d. 2008)
  - Knut Brynildsen, Norwegian association football player, forward for the Norway national football team in the 1938 FIFA World Cup; in Fredrikstad, Norway (d. 1986)
  - Charles J. Girard, American army officer, three time recipient of the Legion of Merit, commander of the Capital Military Assistance Command during the Vietnam War; in Sumter, South Carolina, United States (d. 1970)
  - George Greeley, American composer, known for his scores of popular television shows including My Favorite Martian, The Ghost and Mrs. Muir, Nanny and the Professor, and Small Wonder; as Georgio Guariglia, in Westerly, Rhode Island, United States (d. 2007)
  - E. Reginald Townsend, Liberian politician, cabinet minister for Presidents William Tubman and William Tolbert; as Edison Reginald Townsend, in Schieffelin, Liberia (d. 1980, executed)

== July 24, 1917 (Tuesday) ==
- In Manila Bay, Philippines, Lt. (j.g.) Arnold Marcus, commander of the U.S. Navy submarine A-7, and six of his crew sustained fatal burns and smoke inhalation injuries following a gasoline explosion aboard the submarine.
- Dutch dancer Mata Hari appeared on trial in Paris for spying for Germany with information passed on that caused the death of 50,000 French troops, even though both French and British intelligence could produce little evidence of actual espionage. The high-profile nature of the trial suggested the Georges Clemenceau government was determined to create a public scapegoat to bolster morale following the French Army mutinies in June.
- The Federal Shipbuilding and Drydock Company was founded as the shipbuilding arm of U.S. Steel, supplying ships to the United States Shipping Board for use in World War I.
- Born:
  - Henri Betti, French composer and pianist, best known for his collaborations with Maurice Chevalier and hit songs "C'est si bon"; as Ange Betti, in Nice, France (d. 2005)
  - Robert Farnon, Canadian composer, recipient of the Order of Canada, known for film scores for Captain Horatio Hornblower and Gentlemen Marry Brunettes, and collaborations with Lena Horne, Tony Bennett and Sarah Vaughan; in Toronto, Canada (d. 2005)
  - Leonor Orosa-Goquingco, Filipino dancer, pioneer in introducing and promoting Filipino traditional dance to the international scene; as Leonor Luna Orosa, in Jolo, Sulu, Philippine Islands (present-day Philippines) (d. 2005)
  - Gudmund Harlem, Norwegian politician, Minister of Social Affairs and Minister of Defence from 1955 to 1965; in Oslo, Norway (d. 1988)
  - Simon Slåttvik, Norwegian skier, gold medalist in the 1952 Winter Olympics; in Straumsnes, Fauske, Norway (d. 2001)

== July 25, 1917 (Wednesday) ==
- Finance Minister William Thomas White introduced the first income tax legislation in Canada as a "temporary" measure to finance military operations during World War I.
- Large crowds assembled at College Green in Dublin as the Irish Convention met for the first time.
- Japanese camera manufacturer Nikon was established in Tokyo as Japan Optical Industries Co., Ltd until its re-branding in 1988.
- Walter Costello, an enforcer with Egan's Rats gang in St. Louis, was shot and killed by police while resisting arrest. Gang leader William Egan saw Costello going for his gun when police arrested him and others for being drunk and disorderly at a saloon, shouting "We're not killing policemen!" It prompted one of the officers to draw and shoot Costello, a decision rendered as self-defense by the city police department. Costello was one of the main suspects in the murder of former gang member Harry "Cherries" Dunn in September, 1916.

== July 26, 1917 (Thursday) ==
- Royal Navy cruiser HMS Ariadne was sunk in the English Channel by German submarine SM UC-65 with the loss of 38 of her crew.
- Born:
  - Alberta Adams, American blues singer, known for the albums Detroit's Queen of the Blues and Detroit Is My Home; as Roberta Louise Osborn, in Indianapolis, United States (d. 2014)
  - Dickie Burnell, English rower, gold medalist in the 1948 Summer Olympics; as Richard Desborough Burnell, in Henley-on-Thames, England (d. 1995)
  - Lorna Gray, American actress, best known for her comedic roles in serials for Columbia Pictures; as Virginia Pound, in Grand Rapids, Michigan, United States (d. 2017)

== July 27, 1917 (Friday) ==
- Dutch steam passenger ship Batavier II was shelled and sunk by Royal Navy submarine HMS E55 in the North Sea as it was still believed to be under German control. The crew were able to steer the ship to Dutch waters before abandoning it.
- French fighter pilot Georges Guynemer became the first French ace to score his 50th victory, by shooting down a German DFW aircraft using a SPAD fighter plane.
- St. Andrew's Catholic School was established in Parañaque, Philippines.
- Born:
  - Bourvil, French actor, known for comedic roles in The Sucker and La Grande Vadrouille; as André Robert Raimbourg, in Prétot-Vicquemare, France (d. 1970)
  - John Cunningham, British air force officer, commander of the No. 85 Squadron during World War II, recipient of the Distinguished Service Order, Silver Star and Order of the British Empire; in Croydon, England (d. 2002)
- Died: Emil Theodor Kocher, 75, Swiss medical researcher, recipient of the Nobel Prize in Physiology or Medicine for his research and treatment of the thyroid (b. 1841)

== July 28, 1917 (Saturday) ==
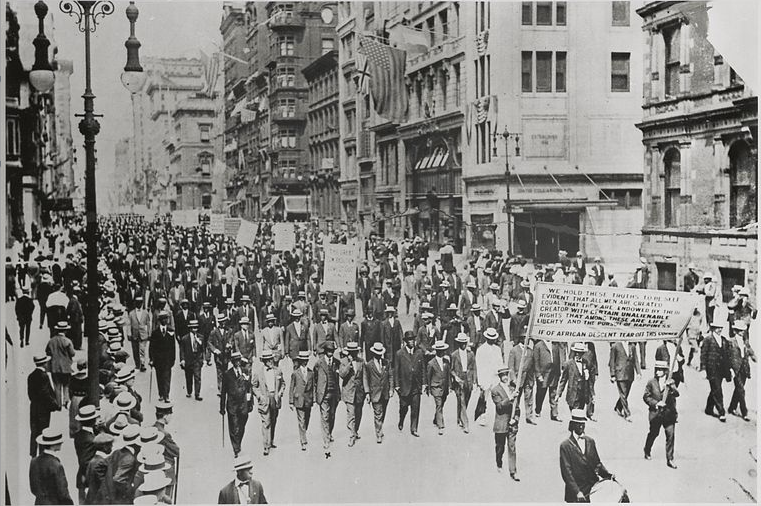
The NAACP's Silent Parade in New York City to protest racial violence.

- Black activist W. E. B. Du Bois and the National Association for the Advancement of Colored People organized the Silent Parade of between 8,000 and 10,000 African-Americans in New York City to protest the East St. Louis massacre in Illinois at the start of the month and lynchings in Tennessee and Texas, as well as encourage U.S. President Woodrow Wilson to bring in anti-lynching legislation.
- German submarine SM UB-20 struck a mine and sank in the North Sea with all 13 crew lost.
- The British established its first Tank Corps with Hugh Elles in command. The corps included A Company (renamed later as the 1st Royal Tank Regiment), Company B (later renamed 2nd Royal Tank Regiment), and Company C (later renamed 3rd Royal Tank Regiment).
- The Roman Catholic Diocese of Wagga Wagga was established in Sydney, Australia.
- The All-Russian Executive Committee of the Union of Railwaymen, or Vikzhel, was formed as the governing body for the largest and most powerful industrial union in Russia.
- Born: Hedwig von Trapp, fifth child of Georg von Trapp, member of the Trapp Family Singers; in Zell am See, Austria-Hungary (present-day Austria) (d. 1972)
- Died:
  - Stephen Luce, 90, American naval officer, first president of the Naval War College (b. 1827)
  - Ririkumutima, Burundi noble, Queen Regent of Burundi from 1908 to 1917 (date of birth unknown)

== July 29, 1917 (Sunday) ==
- A British colonial force of 4,000 troops defeated a German column of 3,000 troops and captured a bridge going across the river Kiawe in German East Africa. The British sustained inflicted 500 casualties and captured 2,500 prisoners while losing 122 casualties.
- German submarine SM UB-27 disappeared but was likely rammed and sunk by a British minesweeper with all 22 crew lost.
- Born: Rochus Misch, German army officer, bodyguard to Adolf Hitler; in Alt Schalkowitz, German Empire (present-day Stare Siołkowice, Poland) (d. 2013)
- Died: Ivan Kolev, 54, Bulgarian army officer, decorated commander in the First and Second Balkan Wars and the Romanian Campaign during World War I (b. 1863)

== July 30, 1917 (Monday) ==
- An earthquake measuring 6.9 in magnitude struck Sichuan, China, killing an estimated 1,800 people and causing heavy damage to the area.
- The Royal Flying Corps established air squadron No. 112.
- The Co-operative Central Exchange was established in Superior, Wisconsin as hub for a network of cooperative stores in the Upper Midwest of the United States.
- The United States National Bank Building in Portland, Oregon opened for business. It was added to the National Register of Historic Places in 1986.
- Liberal Member of Parliament Hastings Lees-Smith read out Siegfried Sassoon's statement of protest, Finished with the War: A Soldier's Declaration, in the British House of Commons.
- Died:
  - Harrison Gray Otis, 80, American publisher, established the Los Angeles Times (b. 1837)
  - Bogdan Radenković, 42-43, Serbian activist, leading member of the Serbian Chetnik Organization, one of the founders of secret military society Black Hand; died of tuberculosis (b. 1874)

== July 31, 1917 (Tuesday) ==
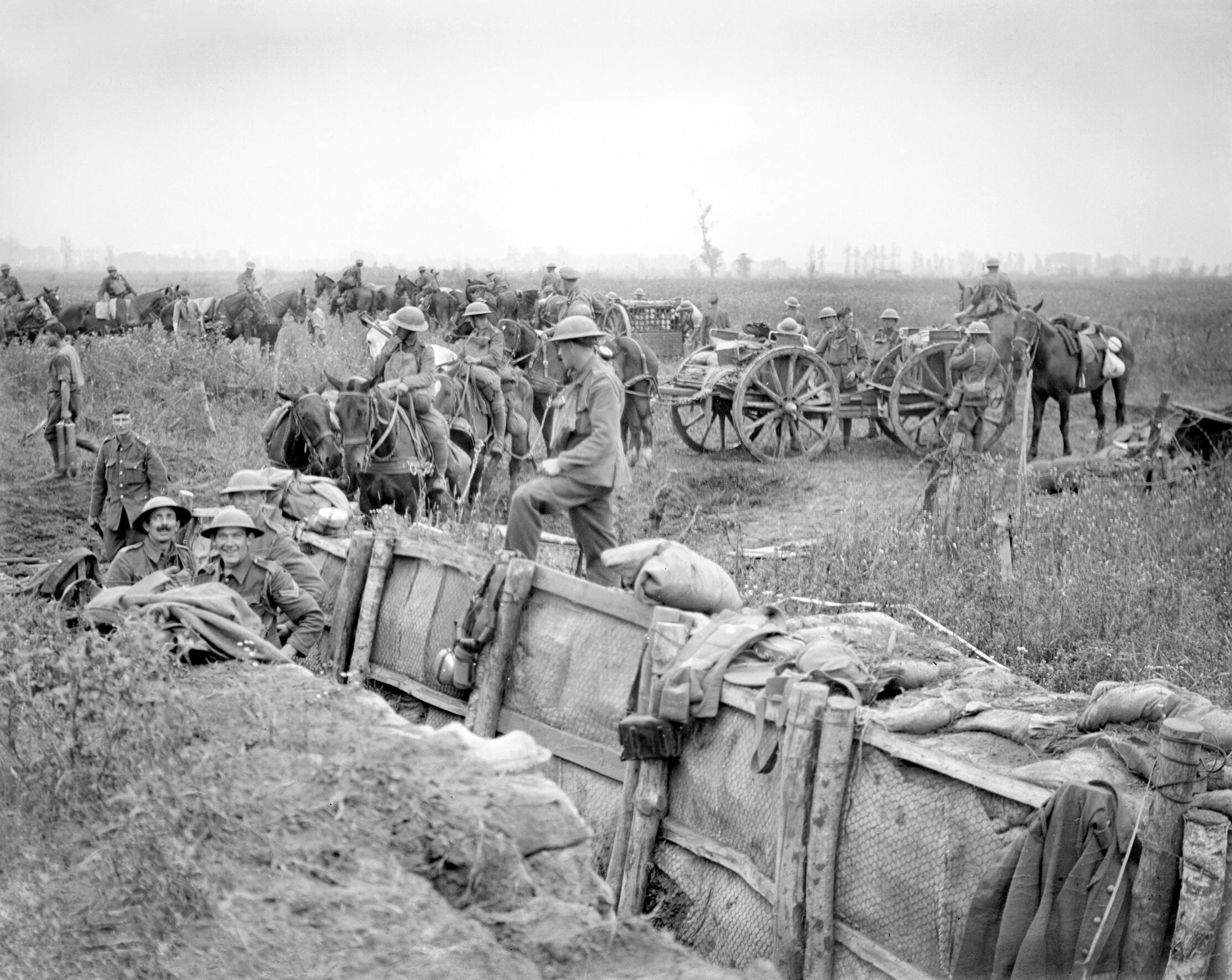
British artillery during the Battle of Pilckem Ridge.

- Battle of Passchendaele – The Allies commenced a new offensive in West Flanders, Belgium, starting with the Battle of Pilckem Ridge. Units with the British Fifth and Second Armies and the French First Army captured Pilckem held by the German Fourth Army.
- The Chesapeake and Ohio Northern Railway opened the Sciotoville Bridge across the Ohio River in the United States to rail traffic. It has a continuous truss across two 775-foot (236 m) spans, the world's longest until 1945.
- Born: HB Jassin, Indonesian literary critic, credited as "The Pope of Indonesian Literature" for his work in researching and preserving Indonesian writings; as Hans Bague Jassin, in Gorontalo, Dutch East Indies (present-day Indonesia) (d. 2000)
- Died:
  - Francis Ledwidge, 29, Irish poet, known for his poetry collections Songs of the Fields and Songs of Peace; killed in action (b. 1887)
  - Hedd Wyn, 30, Welsh poet, known for the poem "Yr Arwr" ("The Hero"); killed in action (b. 1887)
