= R43 =

R43 may refer to:

== Roads ==
- R43 expressway (Czech Republic), now the D43 motorway
- R43 (South Africa)

== Other uses ==
- HMS Comus (R43), a destroyer of the Royal Navy
- R43: May cause sensitisation by skin contact, a risk phrase
- Small nucleolar RNA R43
