= F63 =

F63 or F.63 may refer to:

- Farman F.63, a French aircraft
- HMS Gurkha (F63/G63), a Royal Navy L-class destroyer
- HMS Scarborough (F63), a Royal Navy Whitby-class anti-submarine frigate
