= Betty Wahl =

American novelist (1924–1988)

Elizabeth Alice Wahl (January 16, 1924 – May 12, 1988) was an American novelist and short story writer. She was born on January 16, 1924, in St. Cloud, Minnesota, to Arthur and Romana (Seberger) Wahl. She graduated from the College of Saint Benedict with a major in English and minor in French in 1945.

== Work ==
During her college years, an excerpt of Wahl's unpublished work was sent to author J. F. Powers by Mariella Gable, Wahl's professor in St. Benedict's English Department. Powers came to the campus a month later to offer his advice and proposed to Wahl days later. They married on April 22, 1946. She had five children with Powers: Katherine Anne (born November 11, 1947); Mary Farl (born November 29, 1948); James Ansbury (born November 13, 1953); Hugh Wahl (born November 25, 1955); and Jane Elizabeth (born July 2, 1958).

Shortly after her marriage, Wahl made a debut in The New Yorker with a lauded short story titled "Martinmas." Evelyn Waugh described it as "a brilliant sketch of convent school life which I read with relish." The New Yorker published "Gingerbread" in 1950. Wahl wrote in a 1986 letter to Garrison Keillor that her work adhered to what she called "the world-in-a-grain-of-sand school of writing, which shies away from a great deal of action, preferring instead to reveal meaning through carefully chosen dialogue and setting."

Under precarious financial circumstances due to Powers' unwillingness to work, the family moved frequently and divided their time between Minnesota, Wisconsin, Massachusetts, and extended stays in Ireland. Living in County Wicklow from 1951 to 1952, the family met writers Seán O'Faoláin and Frank O'Connor. From 1957 to 1958, the Powers rented a Georgian house in Dalkey, County Dublin. This setting inspired Wahl to write "A Shorter History of the Irish People", which appeared in The Kenyon Review. She later expanded the story into a novel, Rafferty and Company, published by Farrar, Straus and Giroux in 1969.

== Life ==
Daughter and author Katherine A. Powers writes, in a collection of her father's letters, that Wahl wrote on "a strict schedule" and held the family together: she "cooked every meal from scratch and sewed most of our clothes; she went to her parents for aid; she scrimped, rationed, and cobbled together the wherewithal for our survival." Though both Wahl and Powers write about post-war Ireland and "satirize domestic itinerancy" in similar ways, only Wahl's work has suffered critical neglect.

Wahl continued to write until her death on May 12, 1988, and left behind a multitude of letters, three unpublished novels, and close to twenty short stories.

== Writing ==
- Martinmas (1947)
- Gingerbread (1950)
- A Shorter History of the Irish People (1964)
- Rafferty and Co (1969)
