= 5th Frigate Squadron =

- Active: August 1946 – December 1980
- Country: United Kingdom
- Branch: Royal Navy
- Size: Squadron

Commanders
- First: Captain George K. Collett
- Last: Captain D. Benjamin Bathurst

The 5th Frigate Squadron was an administrative unit of the Royal Navy from 1946 to 1980.

== Operational history ==
During its existence, the squadron included Loch-class, Type 15, Whitby-class, Rothesay-class and Leander-class frigates. Ships of the squadron participated in the Suez Campaign, Beira Patrol, the Silver Jubilee Fleet Review, the Armilla Patrol and the Falklands War.

=== Silver Jubilee 1977 ===
At the Silver Jubilee Fleet Review, 24–29 June 1977, 5th Frigate Squadron comprised:

- HMS Hermione – Capt J. A. B. Thomas, RN (Captain Fifth Frigate Squadron)
- HMS Birmingham – Capt P. J. Symons, RN
- HMS Nubian – Cdr J. R. Griffiths, RN

== Squadron commander ==
Commander	Ship	Dates
Captain George K. Collett	HMS Cardigan Bay	August 1946-1948
Captain Gordon T.S. Gray	HMS Wakeful/HMS Torquay	November 1955-October 1957
Captain Edward M. Usherwood	HMS Torquay	October 1957-September 1959
Captain Józef Bartosik	HMS Scarborough	September 1959-January 1961
Captain David A. Dunbar-Nasmith	HMS Scarborough/HMS Berwick	January 1961-1963
Captain David W. Brown	HMS Hermione	December 1972-April 1974
Captain Peter M. Stanford	HMS Hermione	April 1974-June 1975
Captain Geoffrey R.T. Duffay	HMS Hermione	June 1975-January 1977
Captain John A.B. Thomas	HMS Hermione	January 1977-February 1978
Captain John B.L. Watson	HMS Hermione	February-July 1978
Captain D. Benjamin Bathurst	HMS Minerva	September 1978-December 1980

== See also ==
- List of squadrons and flotillas of the Royal Navy
