= Józef Bartosik =

Rear-Admiral Józef Bartosik CB DSC
- Born: 20 July 1917; Topola Wielka, Poland
- Died: 14 January 2008 (aged 90); Moreton in Marsh Hospital, Gloucestershire, England
- Military career
- Allegiance: Poland (1935–48); United Kingdom (1948–68)
- Branch: Polish Navy; Royal Navy
- Service years: 1935–1968
- Rank: Rear-Admiral
- Commands: HMS London (1963–66); RNAS Culdrose (1961–63); 5th Frigate Squadron (1959–60); HMS Comus (1955–56)
- Conflicts: Second World War
- Awards: Virtuti Militari; Cross of Valour; Companion of the Order of the Bath; Distinguished Service Cross

Rear-Admiral Józef Czeslaw Bartosik, CB, DSC (20 July 1917 – 14 January 2008) was a Polish Naval officer who served in Polish destroyers under British naval command during the Second World War. Shortly after the war, he joined the British Royal Navy and advanced to the rank of rear admiral, before his retirement in 1968. He died in England at age 90.

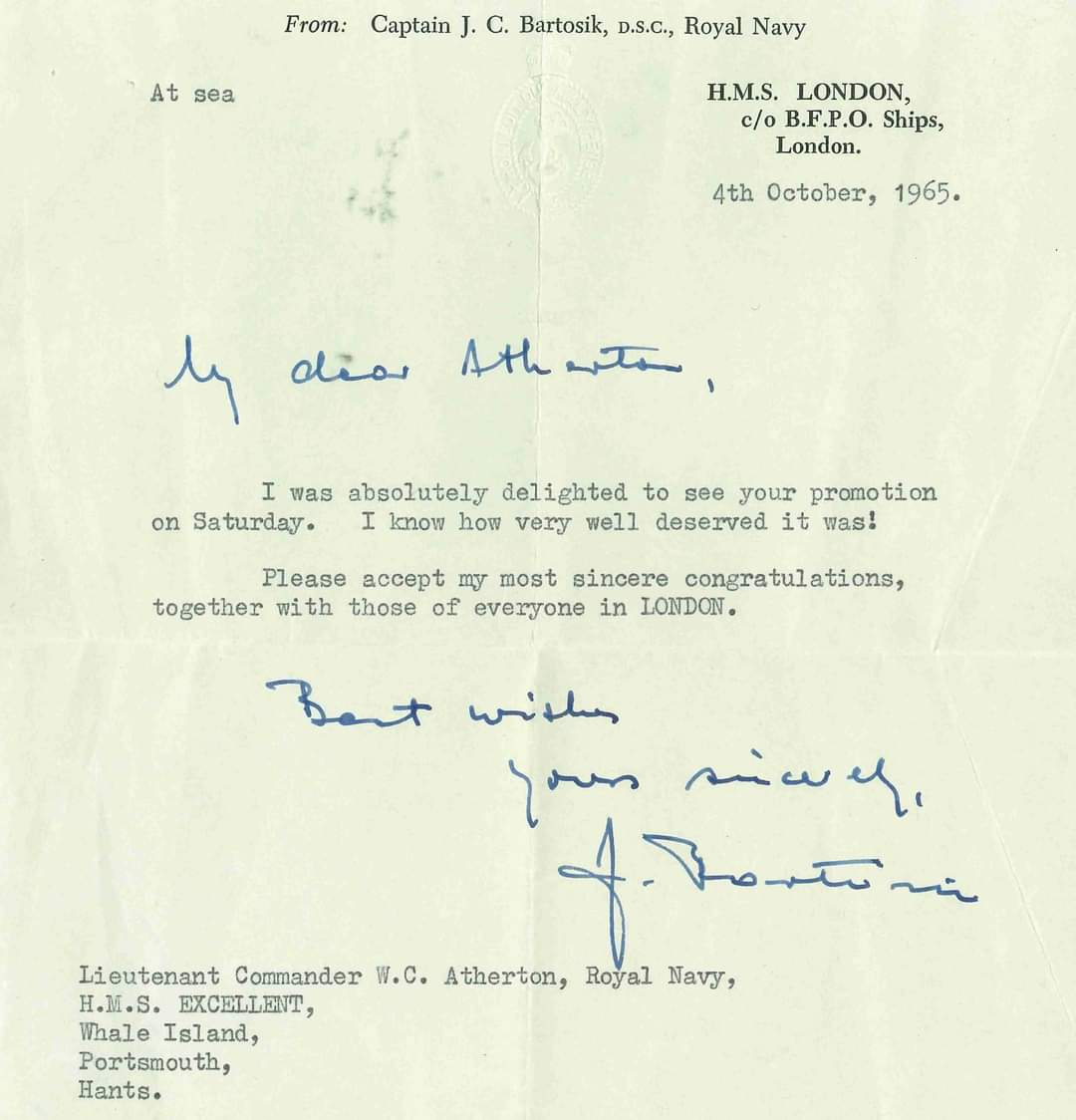
Letter of Congratulation

== Wartime service in the Polish Navy ==
In 1935, at the age of 18, Bartosik joined the naval officer cadet school in Toruń. He graduated in 1938 and in 1939 he was the first watch officer in the cadet schooner ORP Iskra. During the latter half of 1939, he led the wooden sailing ship on a voyage through the Mediterranean and into Southern Atlantic waters. On learning of the 1939 invasion of Poland by Nazi German forces, Iskra returned from the Atlantic and left two crew members with the ship in Morocco. Along with the rest of Iskra's crew, Bartosik boarded a French ship and departed for France, where after deliberations between the French Navy's War Department and free Polish forces, he reported as a member of the reserve officer group at the ship-base ORP Gdynia in the United Kingdom.

In 1940, Bartosik served as a watch keeping officer and deputy gunnery officer aboard the destroyer ORP Błyskawica. During this time, he was instrumental in Błyskawica's downing of two Luftwaffe aircraft during the Norwegian campaign. He was also in the first crew of the destroyer ORP Garland, where he was a watch keeping officer. After promotion to first lieutenant in 1941 he took over responsibilities of the gunnery officer. In Garland, he participated in action in the Mediterranean and the raid on Spitsbergen involving the evacuation of the Norwegian Royal family; as well as serving in convoys in the Arctic, Atlantic, near Iceland and the Mediterranean. In 1942 he became flag lieutenant to the chief operating officer of the navy. In 1943 he served aboard Błyskawica as the gunnery officer and participated in Operation Neptune. In 1944 he was promoted captain and returned to the department of the navy. In 1945 he became the gunnery officer of the Polish cruiser ORP Conrad. Bartosik helped to carry Red Cross supplies to Norway and Denmark before Conrad was returned to the Royal Navy in September 1946. For his actions he was awarded a Virtuti Militari, a Cross of Valour and a British Distinguished Service Cross (DSC).

== Post-war service in the Royal Navy ==
In 1948 Bartosik was one of only three Polish officers to be accepted into the Royal Navy out of several hundred who volunteered. It meant relinquishing his wartime rank of lieutenant commander, and he was appointed to the battleship HMS Anson as a lieutenant with seniority from July 1941. His draft to Anson was nearly rescinded when her captain noticed that Bartosik dared to sport his Polish Virtuti Militari ahead of his British DSC. He was dispatched to serve on escort vessels. From 1955 to 1958 he was the commander of the frigate HMS Comus. From September 1959 he led the 5th Frigate Squadron from HMS Scarborough. From 1962 to 1963 he was commander of Royal Naval Air Station RNAS Culdrose. From 1964 to 1965, he commanded the guided missile destroyer HMS London, and from 1966 to 1968 he was Assistant Chief of Naval Staff (Operations), with the rank of rear admiral. He retired from the Royal Navy in August 1968.

During his time in command of London, Bartosik was involved in a notorious incident. Having sacked his second-in-command in the newly commissioned guided-missile destroyer London in late 1965, he was sent the strong character Mike Henry as a replacement. When London arrived in Singapore for maintenance work Bartosik, for unspecified reasons, had him placed under arrest in his cabin. Henry endured this treatment, but the Fleet chaplain had to intervene with the Captain of the Fleet to obtain his release. Later Bartosik is alleged to have written to Rear Admiral Horace Law, then Flag Officer Submarines, saying that he considered Henry unsuitable for an important submarine appointment "understood to be impending". Law’s reply is said to have been one of the few occasions when Bartosik’s legendary malevolence was checked.

== Author ==
Bartosik was the author of the book Faithful Ship (in Polish) published in 1947, by Orbis of London.

== Honours and awards ==
- Silver Cross of the Order of Virtuti Militari
- Cross of Valour
- Marine Medal, three times
- Companion of the Order of the Bath (UK)
- Distinguished Service Cross (UK)
- 1939-1945 Star (UK)
- Africa Star (UK)
- Atlantic Star (UK)
- France and Germany Star (UK)
- War Medal 1939–1945 (UK)
