= Mary Farl Powers =

Irish-American graphic artist (1948–1992)

- Born: November 29, 1948; St. Cloud, Minnesota, U.S.
- Died: April 4, 1992 (aged 43); Ireland
- Parents: James Farl Powers; Betty Wahl

Mary Farl Powers (November 29, 1948 – April 4, 1992) was an Irish-American graphic artist.

== Early life and family ==
Mary Farl Powers was born on November 29, 1948 in St. Cloud, Minnesota, United States. Her father, James Farl Powers, was an Irish-American writer. She was one of five children. The family moved between Ireland and the US, before settling back in the US in 1975. At this point, Powers remained in Dublin. She moved to Ireland in 1951, studying art in Dublin, first at the Dun Laoghaire School of Art and then the National College of Art. Her sister, Katherine A. Powers, was a writer and worked with Powers at the Graphic Studio Gallery.

== Career ==
Powers exhibited at the Peacock Theatre in 1972. She joined the Graphic Studio in Dublin in 1973, initially specialising in etching, before moving to other forms of printmaking. She exhibited at the International Print Biennale, Ljubljana in 1973. She exhibited widely nationally and internationally.

At the 1975 Listowel Graphics Exhibition, she won a gold medal. In 1978, she won a major Arts Council grant and exhibited at the triennial exhibition at Lalit Kala Akedemi, New Dehli. She was elected a member of the Aosdána in 1981. In 1983, she helped found the Graphic Studio Gallery, and served as its director.

Powers died of breast cancer on 4 April 1992.

The Office of Public Works holds 37 works by her. The Hugh Lane Gallery, the Ulster Museum, and the National Gallery of Ireland all hold examples of her work. In 1995, the Irish Museum of Modern Art (IMMA) held a major retrospective exhibition. A Graphic Studio Award for printmakers was established in her memory by the Arts Council in 1996. Her family donated 50 works by Powers to IMMA in 2009.

Powers' partner, Paul Muldoon, wrote the long form poem Incantata in her memory. He wrote it immediately after her death in 1992, but it was premiered in 2018 at the Galway Arts Festival.
