= HMS London (D16) =

1963 County-class guided missile destroyer of the Royal Navy

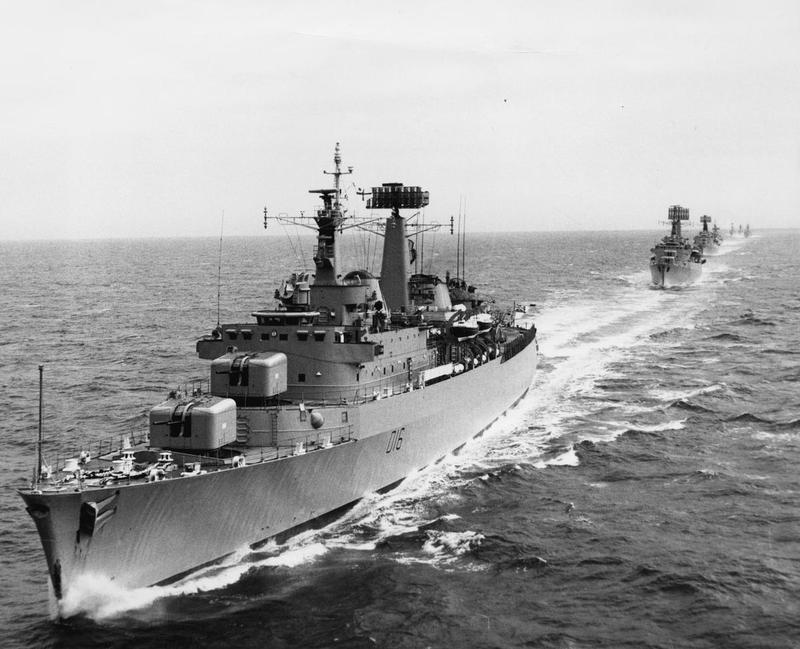
- HMS London leads Antrim and Norfolk in the English Channel after taking part in joint exercises with the RAF in the Atlantic, North Sea and Norwegian Sea, December 1971

History

United Kingdom
- Name: HMS London
- Ordered: 6 February 1957
- Builder: Swan Hunter
- Laid down: 26 February 1960
- Launched: 7 December 1961
- Commissioned: 14 November 1963
- Decommissioned: December 1981
- Identification: Pennant number: D16
- Fate: Sold to Pakistan on 24 March 1982

Pakistan
- Name: Babur
- Acquired: March 1982
- Decommissioned: 1993
- Fate: Sold for scrap in 1995

General characteristics
- Class & type: County-class destroyer
- Displacement: 6,200 tons (6,800 tons full load)
- Length: 158.6 m (520 ft 4 in)
- Beam: 53 ft (16 m)
- Draught: 20 ft (6.1 m)
- Propulsion: COSAG (Combined steam and gas) turbines, 2 shafts
- Speed: 31.5 knots (58.3 km/h)
- Range: 3,500 nautical miles (6,500 km)
- Complement: 470
- Armament: 1× Sea Slug GWS.2 twin-arm SAM launcher(36 missiles); 2× Sea Cat GWS.21 twin-arm SAM launcher(60 missiles); 4× 4.5 in (114 mm) /45 DP (2× twin gunned turret); 2× 20 mm AA; 2× triple-tubes for 12¾ inch (324 mm) ASW torpedo
- Aircraft carried: 1× Lynx or Wessex helicopter
- Aviation facilities: Flight deck and enclosed hangar for embarking one helicopter

HMS London was a County-class destroyer of the Royal Navy.

== Construction and design ==
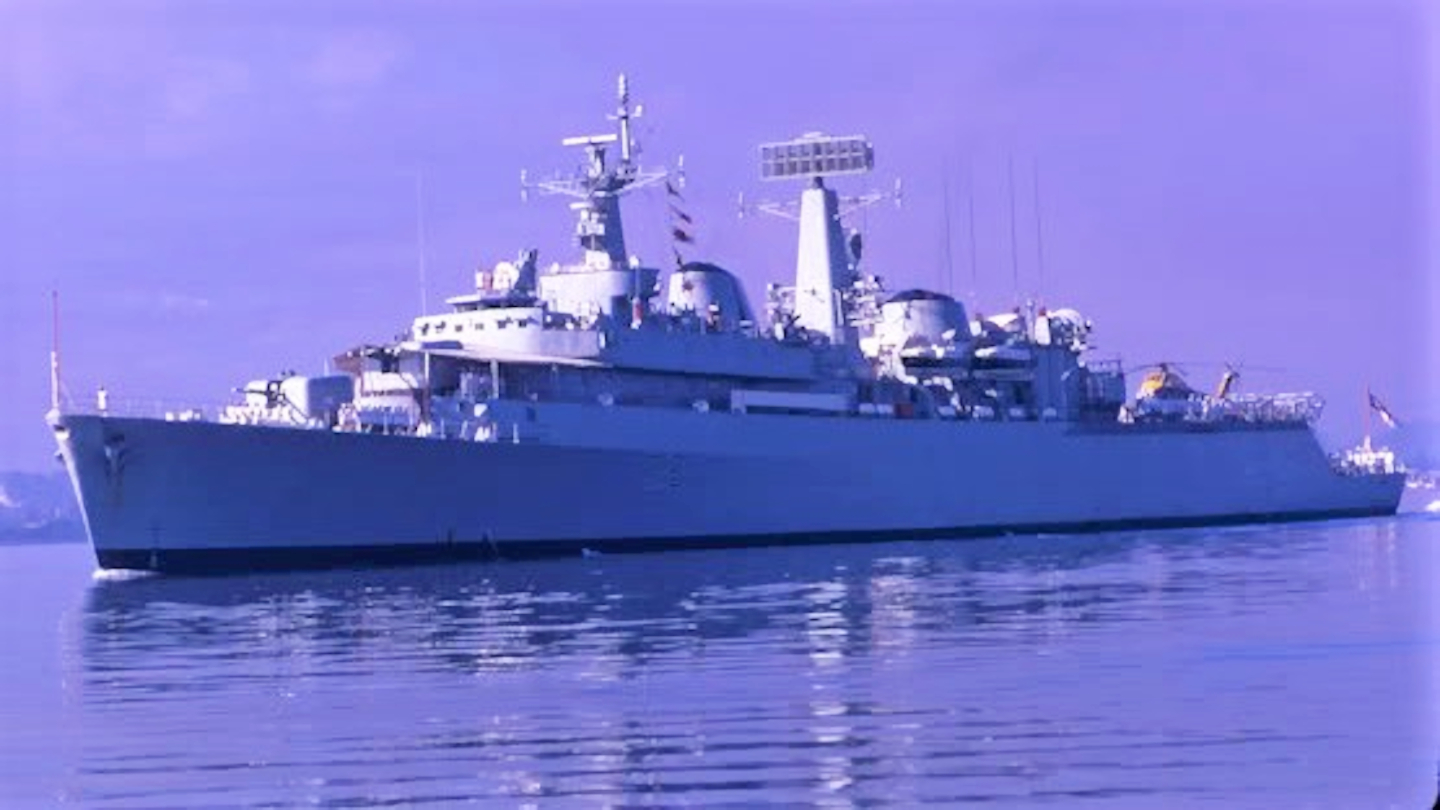
HMS London (D16 - unmarked) entering Southampton, Summer, 1966

London was one of two County-class destroyers ordered under the British Admiralty's 1956–57 shipbuilding programme. She was laid down at Swan Hunter's Wallsend, Tyne and Wear shipyard on 26 February 1960 and launched by Princess Alice, Duchess of Gloucester on 7 December 1961. The ship was completed on 14 November 1963.

London was 521 feet 6 inches (158.95 m) long overall and 505 feet (153.92 m) between perpendiculars, with a beam of 54 feet (16.46 m) and a draught of 20 feet 6 inches (6.25 m). Displacement was 6,200 long tons (6,300 t) normal and 6,800 long tons (6,900 t) deep load. The ship was propelled by a combination of steam turbines and gas turbines in a Combined steam and gas (COSAG) arrangement, driving two propeller shafts. Each shaft could by driven by a single 15,000 shaft horsepower (11,000 kW) steam turbine (fed with steam at 700 pounds per square inch (4,800 kPa) and 950 °F (510 °C; 783 K) from Babcock & Wilcox boilers) and two Metrovick G6 gas turbines (each rated at 7,500 shaft horsepower (5,600 kW)), with the gas turbines being used for high speeds and to allow a quick departure from ports without waiting for steam to be raised. Maximum speed was 30 knots (35 mph; 56 km/h) and the ship had a range of 3,500 nautical miles (4,000 mi; 6,500 km) at 28 knots (32 mph; 52 km/h).

A twin launcher for the Seaslug anti-aircraft missile was fitted aft. The Seaslug GWS1 was a beam riding missile which had an effective range of about 34,000 yd (31 km). Up to 39 Seaslugs could be carried horizontally in a magazine that ran much of the length of the ship. Close-in anti-aircraft protection was provided by a pair of Seacat missile launchers, while two twin QF 4.5 inch Mark V gun mounts were fitted forward. A helicopter deck and hangar allowed a single Westland Wessex helicopter to be operated.

A Type 965 long-range air-search radar and a Type 278 height-finding radar was fitted on the ship's mainmast, with a Type 992Q navigation radar and an array of ESM aerials were mounted on the ship's foremast. Type 901 fire control radar for the Seaslug missile was mounted aft. Type 184 sonar was fitted.

== Royal Navy service ==
=== Early service ===
London commissioned at Swan Hunter's yard in Wallsend on 14 November 1963 under Captain J.C. Bartosik and was initially fully employed setting her armament to work, successfully firing her Sea Slug surface-to-air missile for the first time off Aberporth in April 1964. After working up, during which she entertained the Duke of Edinburgh on board, she crossed the Atlantic in September 1964. She visited Bermuda and Houston before joining a special squadron led by Vice-Admiral Sir Fitzroy Talbot on a round of visits to the South American part of his command. Passing through Panama, she visited Peru, Chile, Uruguay and Brazil before proceeding via Tristan da Cunha to Simonstown, where she spent Christmas. New Year's was spent at sea en route to Mauritius, where the ship's helicopter was used to build a TV mast. She then deployed to the Far East, visiting Hong Kong, Bangkok, Subic, Singapore and ports in Malaya. During this time she was part of a powerful fleet whose presence acted as a deterrent to President Sukarno of Indonesia's attempt to intimidate the infant Federation of Malaysia through 'Confrontation'. She then returned to the UK via Aden and assisted the Adrian Augusta adrift in the Red Sea before entering Suez, proceeding to Gibraltar, then Portsmouth and took part in Navy Days at Portsmouth in 1965.

=== More world travel ===
On Easter Monday 1969 London sailed for the Far East; she had onboard Admiral of the Fleet Sir Varyl Begg GCB., DSO., DSC. who was taking passage to take up his appointment as Governor and C-in-C Gibraltar. The ship sailed into Gibraltar on 17 April flying the flag of an Admiral of the Fleet. After that, she continued her passage, calling in at Simonstown and then onto Beira Patrol before heading for Gan and Singapore. She accordingly spent the period from June to late September in the South China Sea visiting Hong Kong, Manila and Subic Bay as well as spending two weeks in Japan as well as spells in her base port of Singapore. In September, she sailed in company with HMNZS Otago, into New Zealand visiting Auckland, Gisborne where she led a group of ships celebrating Captain Cook's first landing in New Zealand in October 1769. After three days of exceptional hospitality, London sailed for Wellington and Lyttelton. She then crossed the Tasman Sea to Hobart and after that up to Melbourne, where the ship's company were pleased to experience the Gold Cup.

The ship spent two weeks in Sydney before steaming back to Singapore for Christmas and the New Year. She subsequently sailed across the Indian Ocean to carry out a short stint of Beira patrol; she then sailed round the Cape of Good Hope and on across the Atlantic to carry out Sea Slug missile firings in a tactical setting with the US Navy. A short visit to St Vincent and Puerto Rico allowed the ship's company a few days ashore before London headed back to Portsmouth, having completed an extremely busy 12 months. There ensued docking and repairing defects in Portsmouth before carrying out workup in October and visits to Greenock before Christmas leave, prior to sailing in early February 1971 for a nine-month tour of duty in the Mediterranean. This period allowed for a wonderful opportunity for cultural visits in Leghorn (for Pisa and Florence, Civitia Vecchia for Rome and Pompeii and Naples as well as Trieste from where a visit to Venice was possible). The ship called in at Crete for the 30th anniversary of the battle in May 1941. She also called in at Cyprus and Istanbul from where a trip round the Black Sea included a visit to Samsun. The ship gave station leave in Gibraltar and Naples; returning to Portsmouth in early November 1971. In 31 months she had carried out two deployments lasting 21 months, had spent six weeks working up between deployments as well as visits to Scotland and missile firing practice at Aberforth.

=== 'Lasts and decommissioning ===
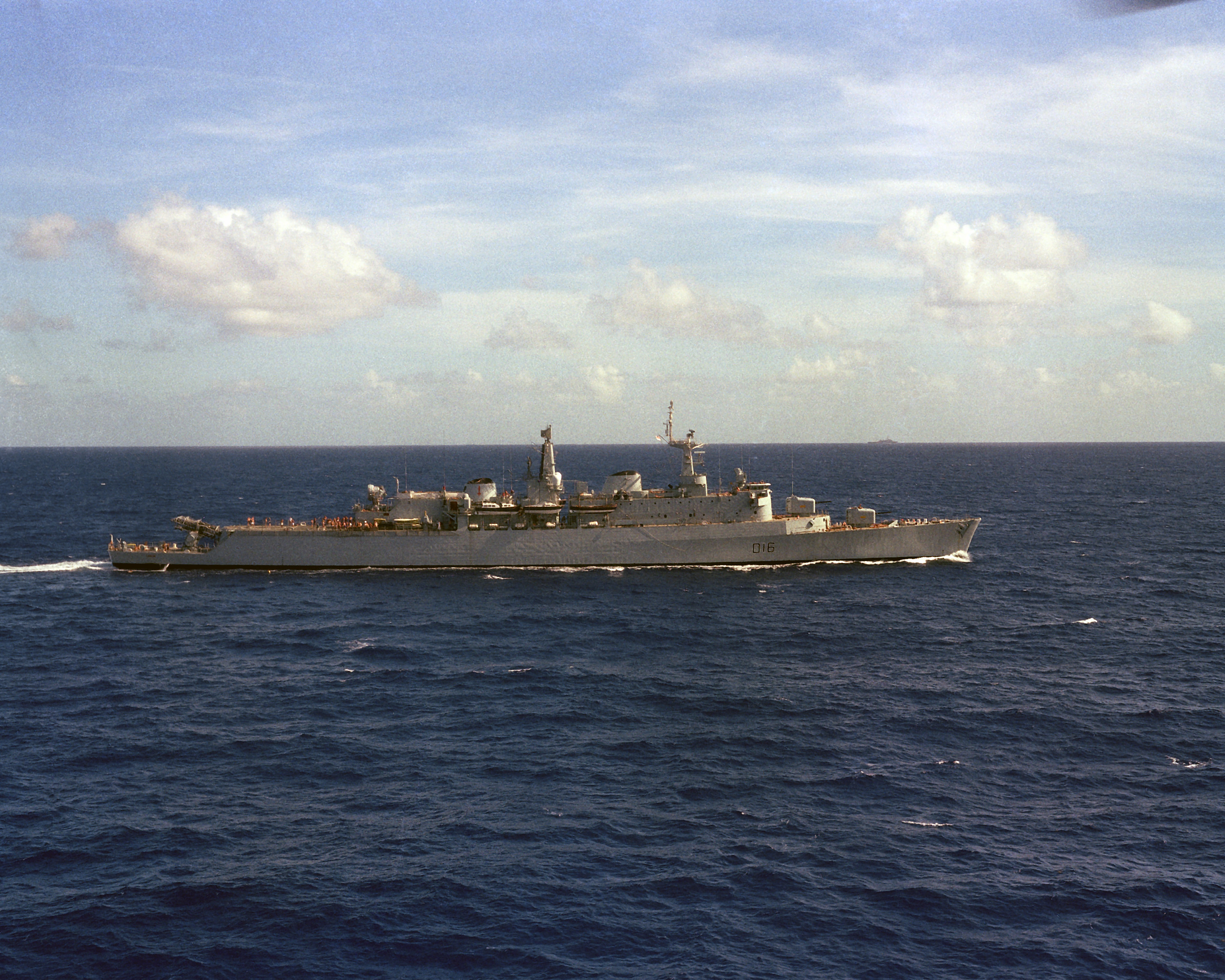
HMS London in 1981

London was chosen to represent Great Britain for the celebrations in New York City for the American Bicentennial celebrations in July 1976. The crew went to great lengths to make the ship clean and 'ship-shape' for the visit, and London hosted several diplomatic and social functions while she was there. Her crew enjoyed an extended liberty period out on the town.

London was the last ship to leave Malta when the Maltese government closed the base. She attended the 1977 Silver Jubilee Fleet Review off Spithead when she was part of the First Flotilla.

The ship was the last RN vessel capable of firing Mark 1 Sea Slug missiles, firing the last 17 Mk 1 seaslugs on 9 December 1981 as targets for Cardiff and Glasgow Sea Darts and 4.5 shells as targets for Brilliant Seawolf and on the 10 December 1981, the ship had the distinction of being the ship that carried out the Navy's final twin turret broadside when all four of her 4.5-inch guns were fired at once

London was decommissioned in late December 1981 after completing a three-month deployment to the West Indies as Belize Guardship, during which her crew were involved in the granting of independence to Antigua.

== Pakistan naval service ==
London was sold to Pakistan on 23 March 1982 and recommissioned Babur under Captain Mukhtar Azam. Babur was decommissioned from Pakistani service in 1993 and sold for scrap in 1995.

== Commanding officers ==
Notable commanding officers include J C Bartosik between 1963-1966 and Ronald Forrest during 1970-1972.

== Legacy ==
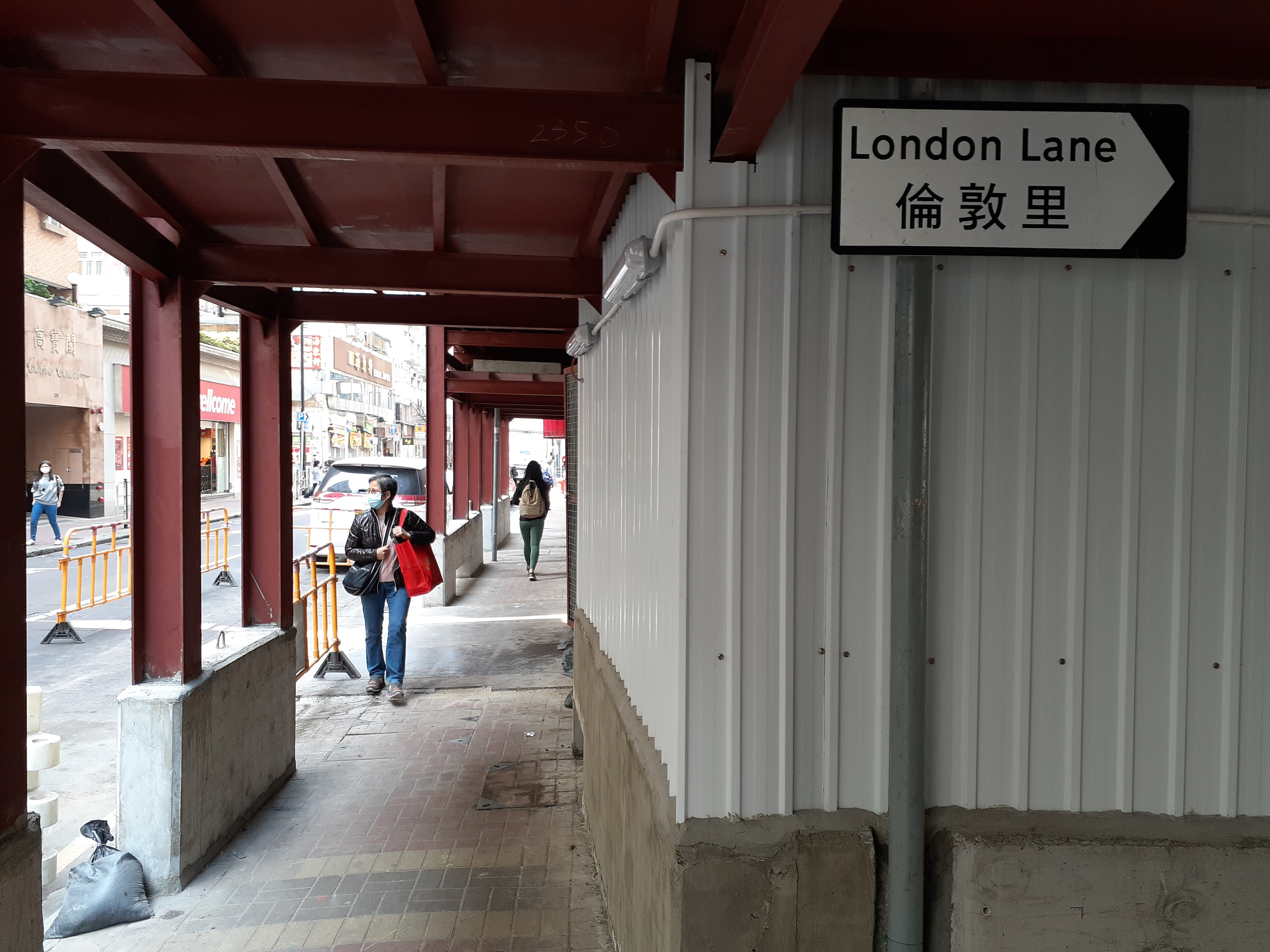
Street sign of London Lane

London berthed Hong Kong in August 1969 during her first commission. Her seamen built a pier with concrete and wooden boards on a beach on the island of Ap Lei Chau, facing Aberdeen Harbour. The pier was then named London Pier (Cantonese: 倫敦碼頭) and the lane connected to it was named as London Lane (Cantonese: 倫敦里), after the name of the destroyer. The pier was later demolished but the lane remains.

== Bibliography ==
- Blackman, Raymond V. B. (1971). Jane's Fighting Ships 1971–72. London: Sampson Low, Marston & Co. Ltd. ISBN 0-354-00096-9.
- Colledge, J. J.; Warlow, Ben (2006) [1969]. Ships of the Royal Navy: The Complete Record of All Fighting Ships of the Royal Navy from the 15th Century to the Present (3rd Rev ed.). London: Chatham Publishing. ISBN 978-1-86176-281-8. OCLC 67375475.
- Friedman, Norman (2008). British Destroyers & Frigates: The Second World War and After. Barnsley, UK: Seaforth Publishing. ISBN 978-1-84832-015-4.
- Gardiner, Robert; Chumbley, Stephen (1995). Conway's All The World's Fighting Ships 1947–1995. Annapolis, Maryland, USA: Naval Institute Press. ISBN 1-55750-132-7.
- Marriott, Leo (1989). Royal Navy Destroyers Since 1945. Shepperton, UK: Ian Allan. ISBN 0-7110-1817-0.
- McCart, Neil (2014). County Class Guided Missile Destroyers. Maritime Books. ISBN 978-1904459637.
