= Morte d'Urban =

1962 novel by J. F. Powers

- First edition
- Author: J. F. Powers
- Published: 1962 (Doubleday)
- Publication place: United States
- Media type: Print (hardcover and paperback)
- Pages: 236
- Award: National Book Award (1963)

Morte d'Urban is the debut novel of J. F. Powers. It was published by Doubleday in 1962. It won the 1963 National Book Award. It is still in print, having been reissued by The New York Review of Books in 2000.

The novel tells the story of Father Urban Roche, a member of a fictitious religious order, the Clementines. Urban has a reputation as a gifted public speaker, but is sent by the superior to a remote retreat house in rural Minnesota. There he puts his skills to work improving the facilities and the local church.

The book has been widely praised. Thomas Merton called it "a valid and penetrating study of the psychology of a priest in what is essentially a spiritual conflict". In a consideration of the book in The Washington Post four decades later, Jonathan Yardley called it "our great workplace saga" and "subtler, wittier and much more elegantly written" than Sinclair Lewis’s Babbitt.

== Plot summary ==
Based in Chicago, Father Urban Roche is a member of the Clementines, a fictitious religious order. In his estimation, the Clementines are stagnating. They care little about innovation and are content to remain as they are. Urban's charismatic, energetic personality contrasts with the rest of the Order. Through his charisma, he befriends a wealthy benefactor, Billy Cosgrove, who helps Urban secure new quarters for the Order. Despite Urban's charismatic spirit, he is sent to The Order of St. Clement, a failing retreat house in rural Minnesota.

In Minnesota, Urban is joined by Father Jack, an aging priest also transferred from Chicago. Father Wilfrid presides over The Order of St. Clement and is primarily concerned with completing repairs to the facility. To Urban's dismay, the property is in sorry shape, and the Order hardly has the means to repair it. True to his spirit, Urban dreams of making the retreat a better place, and it is renamed St. Clement's Hill.

Urban becomes involved with the surrounding communities, slowly gaining a following thanks to his public speaking skills. He plays a large role in revitalizing a local parish and makes connections throughout the community, particularly with the Thwaites family. Mrs. Thwaites, an aging widow, was the previous owner of St. Clement's hill before donating the property to the Order.

Thanks to Cosgrove's patronage, Urban is able to buy property neighboring St. Clement's Hill to turn into a golf course. With this innovation, the retreat becomes more popular than ever. The bishop, a man Urban feels greatly competitive with, comes to visit the golf course. The two play a game, during which Urban is hit in the head by a golf ball. This serves as a turning point for him.

Soon after this, Cosgrove and Urban take a fishing trip. Cosgrove cruelly attempts to drown a deer, and Urban knocks him out of the boat. Angry, Cosgrove responds in kind, pushing Urban out of the boat and stranding him. He is left to find his way back home. Luckily, while he is waiting for the bus, Mrs. Thwaites's daughter, Sally, drives by and offers Urban a ride.

The two spend the evening together on a small island in the middle of a lake on the Thwaiteses’ property, drinking and talking. Sally challenges Urban to a swim, but, feeling as if their relationship is heading in an immoral direction, he declines. Sally then goes for a swim alone and takes the boat, leaving Urban stranded again and forced to swim back to shore.

In terms of his career, Urban has never been more successful. He is soon elected Father Provincial and returns to Chicago. But his health is failing and his charisma and energy have ebbed. He has become part of the bureaucracy he formerly challenged and maintains the status quo.

== Style ==
Powers was known for his writing about priests, but Morte d'Urban established his voice. Often called the greatest Catholic writer of the 20th century, Powers demonstrates the balance between priests and their profession. He treats the subject with a sharp wit.
