= J. F. Powers =

American writer (1917–1999)

- Born: James Farl Powers; July 8, 1917; Jacksonville, Illinois, U.S.
- Died: June 12, 1999 (aged 81); Collegeville, Minnesota, U.S.
- Occupations: Novelist, short story writer
- Spouse: Betty Wahl (m. 1946)
- Children: 5
- Writing career
- Notable awards: National Book Award for Fiction, 1963

James Farl Powers (July 8, 1917 – June 12, 1999) was an American novelist and short story writer who often drew his inspiration from developments in the Catholic Church, and was known for his studies of Catholic priests in the Midwest. Although not a priest himself, he is known for having captured a "clerical idiom" in postwar North America. His first novel, Morte d'Urban, won the 1963 National Book Award for Fiction.

== Early life ==
Powers was born in Jacksonville, Illinois to a devout Catholic family. He graduated from Quincy College Academy, a Franciscan high school. He took English and philosophy courses at Wright Junior College and at Northwestern University in Chicago, but did not earn a degree. He had various jobs, such as insurance salesman, sales clerk, editor and bookstore clerk.

== Career ==
Powers was a conscientious objector during World War II, and went to prison for it. Later he worked as a hospital orderly. His first writing experiment began as a spiritual exercise during a religious retreat.

His work has long been admired for its gentle satire and its astonishing ability to recreate with a few words the insular but gradually changing world of post-World War II American Catholicism. Evelyn Waugh, Flannery O'Connor, and Walker Percy praised his work, and Frank O'Connor spoke of him as "among the greatest living storytellers".

Prince of Darkness and Other Stories appeared in 1947. His story "The Valiant Woman" received the O. Henry Award in 1947. The Presence of Grace (1956) was also a collection of short stories. His first novel was Morte d'Urban (1962), which won the 1963 National Book Award for Fiction. Look How the Fish Live appeared in 1975 and Wheat that Springeth Green in 1988.

Powers lived in Ireland for thirteen years. After moving back and forth from Ireland, he settled with his family in Collegeville, Minnesota, where he taught creative writing and English literature at Saint John's University.

Following his death in 1999, the New York Review reissued his novels and published The Stories of J. F. Powers in 2000. The Southern Illinois University Special Collections Research Center has collected the records or Manuscript Collections Created by Powers.

== Family life ==
Powers met and married Betty Wahl after reviewing a sample of Wahl's fiction. Sister Mariella Gable, OSB, a member of the College of Saint Benedict English faculty, sent him the sample and Powers asked to meet the writer. Powers and Wahl were married on April 22, 1946, after Wahl's graduation. They had five children, including the artists Mary and Jane.

== Published works ==
- Prince of Darkness and Other Stories (1947)
- Cross Country. St. Paul, Home of the Saints (1949)
- The Presence of Grace (1956)
- Morte d'Urban (novel, 1962)
- Lions, Harts, Leaping Does, and Other Stories (1963)
- Look How the Fish Live (1975)
- Wheat that Springeth Green (novel, 1988)
- The Old Bird, A Love Story (1991)
- The Stories of J. F. Powers (1999)
- Suitable Accommodations: An Autobiographical Story of Family Life: The Letters of J. F. Powers, 1942-1963, edited by Katherine A. Powers (2013)
