= Gus Arriola =

American cartoonist (1917–2008)

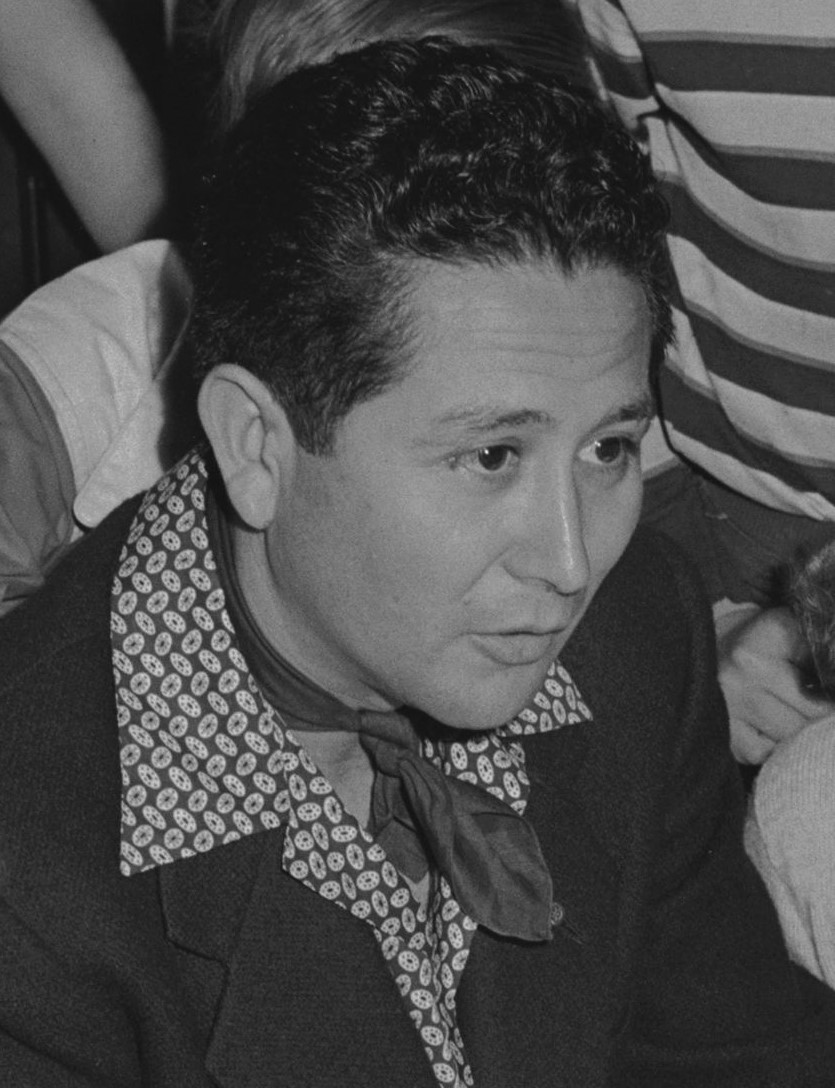
- Arriola in 1949
- Born: Gustavo Arriola; July 17, 1917 Florence, Arizona, U.S.
- Died: February 2, 2008 (aged 90) Carmel, California
- Area: Cartoonist
- Notable works: Gordo
- Awards: National Cartoonist Society's Humor Comic Strip Award, 1957, 1965

Gustavo "Gus" Arriola (July 17, 1917 – February 2, 2008) was an American comic strip cartoonist and animator, primarily known for the comic strip Gordo, which ran from 1941 through 1985.

== Biography ==
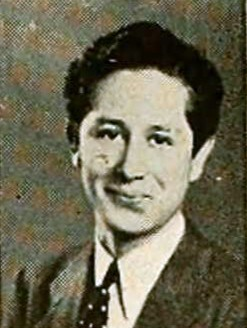
Gus Arriola in 1935

Gus Arriola was born in Florence, Arizona, the youngest of nine children. Arriola's father, Aquiles Arriola, had been born on a hacienda in Sonora, Mexico. Gus's mother died when he was a baby, and he was raised by an older sister in a Spanish-speaking household. He learned English by reading the Sunday comics. His family moved to Los Angeles, California, when he was eight years old. He first studied art formally in Manual Arts High School in Los Angeles, California.

Immediately after high school he spent a year working on Krazy Kat for Screen Gems, then three years animating Tom and Jerry and Lonesome Stranger for the Metro-Goldwyn-Mayer cartoon studio as a "sketch man", before leaving to start his own comic strip. During World War II, he directed training films for the United States Army while continuing to produce Sunday Gordo cartoons.

=== Gordo (1942–1985) ===
Gus Arriola's Gordo (1964)

Although Arriola did not visit Mexico until 1961, he used the human and animal characters of his strip to introduce Mexican culture to readers throughout the world. Gordo was initially designed to be a Mexican version of Li'l Abner, with a highly caricatured style and a lazy overweight title character who spoke in heavily accented English and took naps under a tree wearing a sombrero. The character reflected popular conceptions of Mexicans at the time, particularly Leo Carrillo's portrayal of The Cisco Kid's sidekick, Pancho, on television and film.

After his early strips were criticized for Hollywood-style cultural stereotypes, Arriola realized that his was the only periodical work in American mass media that depicted life in Mexico and modified the strip to be more sympathetic. A much thinner and contemplative Gordo eventually became a flirtatious tour guide, whom Arriola often described as an "accidental ambassador" for Mexican culture. The strip introduced America to such now-popular words and phrases as "hasta la vista", "amigo", "piñata", "compadre", "muchacho" and "hasta mañana", as well as Mayan, Aztec and Mexican customs, history and folklore. Arriola also periodically included traditional Mexican recipes in Gordo that proved popular, telling one interviewer, "In 1948 we ran Gordo's recipe for beans and cheese—which got me into 60 extra papers, by the way."

Arriola did all of the writing, illustration and production of Gordo himself, creating strips every day (except in his army years) for 45 years. Charles Schulz described it as "probably the most beautifully drawn strip in the history of the business." Arriola received the National Cartoonist Society's Humor Comic Strip Award in 1957 and 1965. Although not overtly political, Gordo was also one of the first pop culture works that regularly raised environmentalist concerns.

The last Gordo strip was published on March 2, 1985.

== Personal life ==
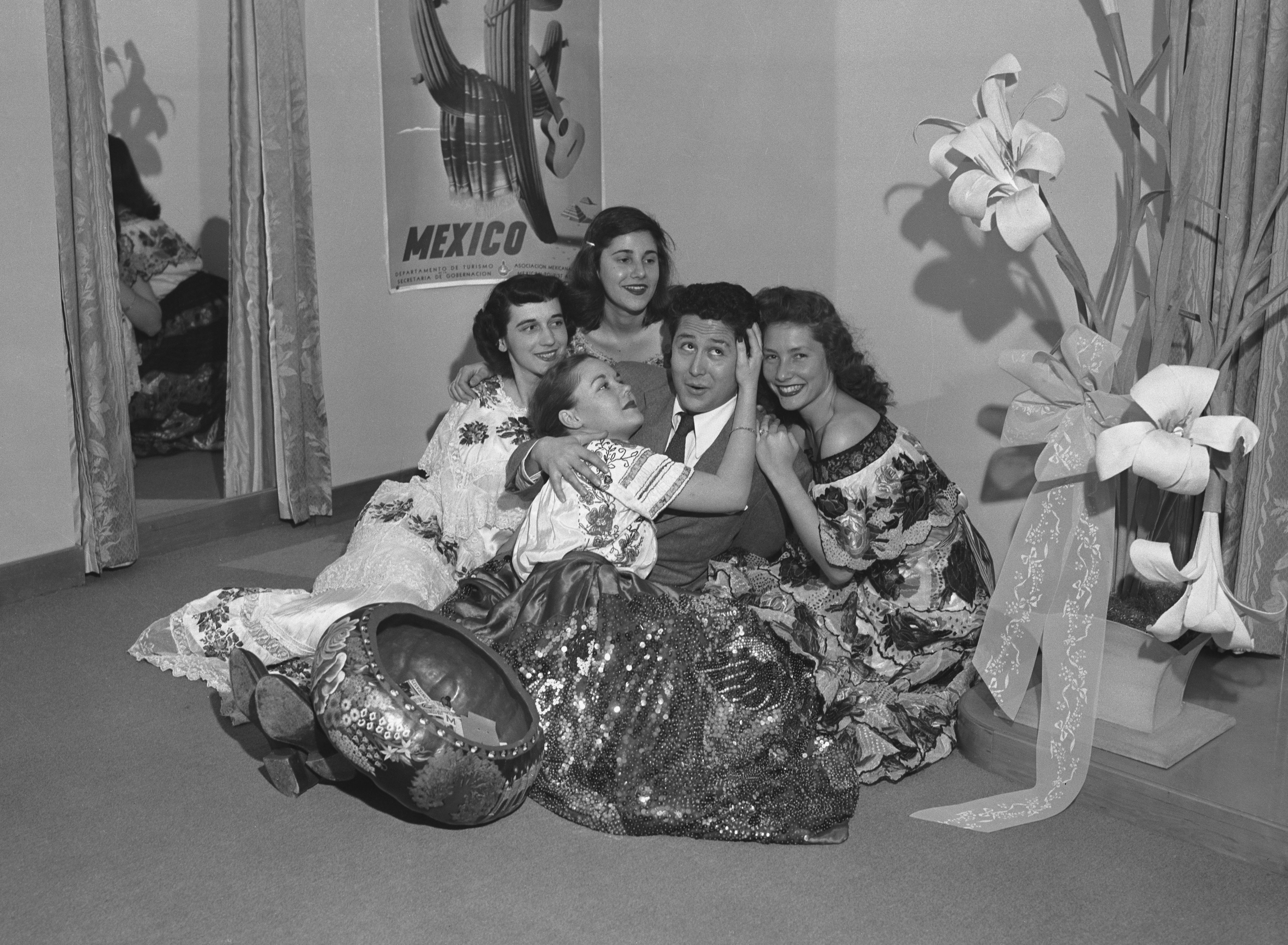
Gus Arriola poses with admirers in 1946.

Arriola met his wife, Mary Frances, at MGM in 1939. They remained married until his death.

While working on Gordo Arriola lived in La Jolla, California, Phoenix, Arizona and then Carmel-by-the-Sea, California, where he ran a shop selling Mexican arts, crafts, and artifacts from 1961 to 1963.

He died in Carmel on 2 February 2008. Shortly before his death he received a lifetime achievement award from the Arts Council for Monterey, California. He had suffered from Parkinson's disease.

On February 20, 2008, the comic strip Baldo noted, "In memory of our amigo Gus Arriola, 1917–2008." The March 21, 2008, version of the comic strip La Cucaracha, by Lalo Alcaraz, was also a tribute to Arriola.

== Awards ==
- 1957 and 1965 – National Cartoonists Society Humor Comic Strip Award
- 1969 Gus Arriola receives a letter of praise by Consul General of Mexico Adolfo S. Dominguez for his educational work on Gordo (comic strip)
- 2007 – Arts Council for Monterey, California Lifetime Achievement Award
