= HMS Scarborough (F63) =

1957 Type 12 or Whitby-class frigate of the Royal Navy

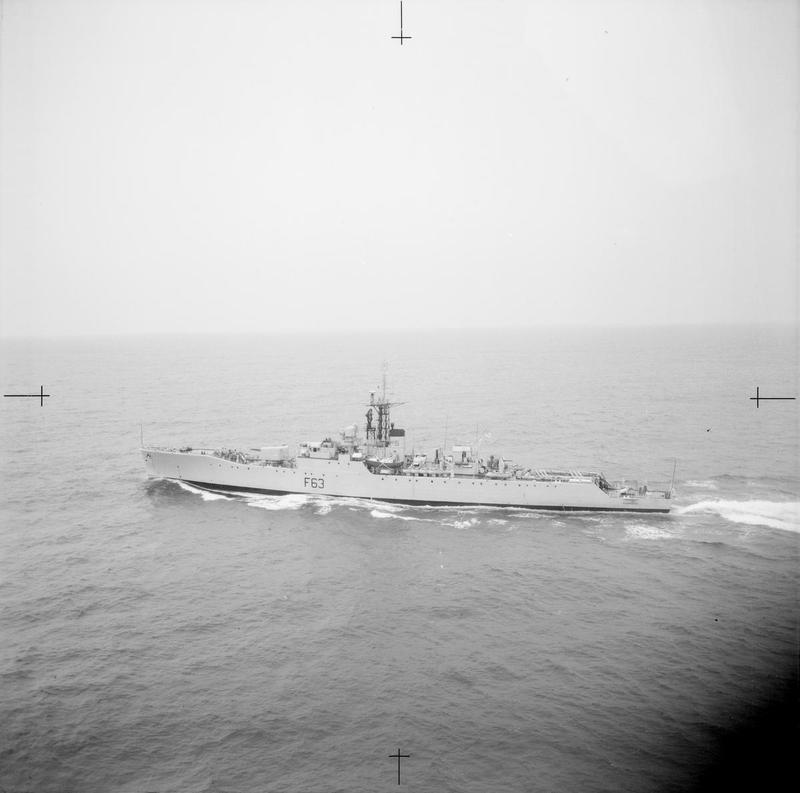
- HMS Scarborough, February 1960

History

United Kingdom
- Name: HMS Scarborough
- Ordered: 6 March 1951
- Builder: Vickers Armstrongs, Newcastle upon Tyne
- Laid down: 11 September 1953
- Launched: 4 April 1955
- Commissioned: 10 May 1957
- Decommissioned: 1972
- Identification: Pennant number: F63
- Fate: Sold to Pakistan Navy in 1975 but not taken up; Sold for scrapping in 1977

General characteristics
- Class & type: Whitby-class frigate
- Displacement: 2,150 tons (2,185 tonnes); 2,560 tons full load (2,600 tonnes)
- Length: 360 ft (109.7 m) w/l; 370 ft (112.8 m) o/a
- Beam: 41 ft (12.5 m)
- Draught: 17 ft (5.18 m)
- Propulsion: Y-100 plant; 2 Babcock & Wilcox boilers, 2 English Electric steam turbines, 2 shafts, 30,000 shp (22 MW)
- Speed: 30 kn (56 km/h)
- Range: 370 tons oil fuel, 4,200 nmi (7,780 km) at 12 knots (22 km/h)
- Complement: 152, later 225
- Sensors & processing systems: Radar Type 293Q target indication; Radar Type 277Q height finding; Radar Type 275 fire control on director Mark 6M; Radar Type 262 fire control on STAAG; Radar Type 974 navigation; later Radar type 978; Type 1010 Cossor Mark 10 IFF; Sonar Type 174 search; Sonar Type 162 target classification; Sonar Type 170 attack
- Armament: 1 × twin 4.5 in (114 mm) gun Mark 6; 1 × twin Bofors 40 mm L/60 gun Mark 2 STAAG, later; 1 × single 40 mm Bofors gun Mark 7; 2 × Limbo A/S mortar Mark 10; 12 × 21 in A/S torpedo tubes (removed or never shipped)

HMS Scarborough was a Whitby-class or Type 12 anti-submarine frigate of the Royal Navy of the United Kingdom. She was named after the town of Scarborough in the county of North Yorkshire.

== Operational Service ==
On commissioning in May 1957, Scarborough joined the 5th Frigate Squadron, and was the leader of the squadron in March 1959 when she took part in "Navy Days" in Portsmouth. Between 1959 and 1961 she was commanded by Józef Bartosik and between 1961 and 1962 by P W Buchanan.

She underwent an extended refit at Portsmouth from December 1962 to February 1964. From April 1964 she served as part of the Dartmouth Training Squadron with sister ships Eastbourne, Tenby and Torquay.

== Publications ==
- Colledge, J. J.; Warlow, Ben (2006) [1969]. Ships of the Royal Navy: The Complete Record of All Fighting Ships of the Royal Navy from the 15th Century to the Present (3rd Rev ed.). London: Chatham Publishing. ISBN 978-1-86176-281-8. OCLC 67375475.
- Critchley, Mike (1992). British Warships Since 1945: Part 5: Frigates. Liskeard, UK: Maritime Books. ISBN 0-907771-13-0.
- Marriott, Leo, 1983. Royal Navy Frigates 1945-1983, Ian Allan Ltd, Surrey.
