= Gordo (comic strip) =

Comic strip by Gustavo "Gus" Arriola

- Gus Arriola's Gordo
- Author: Gus Arriola
- Current status/schedule: Concluded
- Launch date: November 24, 1941
- End date: March 2, 1985
- Syndicate(s): United Feature Syndicate
- Genre(s): Humor, Children, Adults

Gordo was a comic strip written and drawn by the American artist Gustavo "Gus" Arriola (1917–2008) that introduced many Americans to Mexican culture. The strip was praised by the Mexican Government and the California State Legislature for its promotion of international understanding. Charles Schulz described it as "probably the most beautifully drawn strip in the history of the business."

The strip introduced America to such now-popular words and phrases as "hasta la vista," "amigo," "piñata," "compadre," "muchacho" and "hasta mañana," as well as Mayan, Aztec and Mexican customs, history and folklore. Periodically, Arriola also included traditional Mexican recipes in Gordo that proved popular. He told one interviewer, "In 1948 we ran Gordo's recipe for beans and cheese—which got me into 60 extra papers, by the way." Although not overtly political, Gordo was one of the first pop culture works that regularly raised environmentalist concerns.

== Publication history ==
The strip ran from November 24, 1941 to March 2, 1985. At the height of its popularity the strip appeared in 270 newspapers. Arriola did all of the writing, illustration, and production of Gordo, creating strips every day (except during his army years) for 45 years.

One of Arriola's trademarks was to use a comic pseudonym for many of his Sunday comic strips, often a phonetic pun of a recognizable words or a phrase. Examples include "Kant Wynn" (Can't Win), "Overa Cheever" (Over Achiever), "Anne Teak" (Antique), "Liv Anlern" (Live and Learn), "Bob N. Frapples" (Bobbing For Apples), and "E. Trink and Bea Meri" (Eat, Drink, and Be Merry).

== Characters and story ==
The strip chronicled the life of Mexican bean farmer Perfecto Salazar "Gordo" Lopez ("Gordo" approximately translating as "Fatso"). Other characters in the strip included his nephew, Pepito; his pets, Señor Dog and Poosy Gato (a cat); a black cat named "PM" and her kitten "Bête Noire". The 'hip' jazz-loving and artistic 'beat' spider, Bug Rogers, who is drawn with only six legs. Some of Gordo's friends include Paris Juarez Keats Garcia, nicknamed the "Poet", Juan Pablo, and Pelon the bartender. Other supporting characters include the antagonistic Artemisa Rosalinda Gonzalez, a widow determined to marry the bachelor farmer; and Tehuana Mama, Gordo's housekeeper, who later became Gordo's wife.

Initially, Gordo was designed to be a Mexican version of Li'l Abner, with a highly caricatured style and a lazy overweight title character who spoke in heavily accented English and took naps under a tree wearing a sombrero. The character reflected popular conceptions of Mexicans when the strip was introduced, particularly Leo Carrillo's portrayal of The Cisco Kid's sidekick, Pancho, in film and television.

After his early strips were criticized for Hollywood-style cultural stereotypes, Arriola realized that his was the only periodical work in American mass media that depicted life in Mexico and he modified the strip to be more sympathetic. In 1954, Gordo lost his lease on his land and had to travel throughout Mexico as a tour guide. The character's trips were a vehicle for the strip to introduce Mexico and its people to the wider world. A much thinner and contemplative Gordo eventually became a flirtatious tour guide, whom Arriola often described as an "accidental ambassador" for Mexican culture.

== Honors ==
Arriola received recognition given by cartoonists who were his peers, as noted above, and Gordo received the National Cartoonist Society's Humor Comic Strip Award twice, in 1957 and 1965. In 2008, Arriola received honors for his lifetime achievement.

== Final strip ==
The final strip ran on March 2, 1985, where, in a final effort to avoid the advances of the widow Artemisa Rosalinda Gonzalez, Gordo marries his longtime housekeeper, Tehuana Mama. Arriola used three-quarters of the strip to say farewell to his readers.

Final Gordo comic strip (March 2, 1985)

== Sources ==
- Harvey, R.C. and G. Arriola. 2000. Accidental Ambassador Gordo: The Comic Strip Art of Gus Arriola. University of Mississippi Press. ISBN 1-57806-160-1
- Arriola, Gus. 1981. Gordo's Cat. Oak Tree Publications, Inc. ISBN 0-916392-84-8
