= Mariella Gable =

Catholic academic, writer, and literary critic

Mariella Gable OSB
- Born: Mary Margaret Gable; 1898; Wisconsin
- Died: 1985 (aged 86–87)
- Education: Cornell University
- Occupations: Academic, writer, and literary critic
- Writing career
- Language: English

Mariella Gable, OSB (1898–1985) was an American academic, writer, and literary critic.

== Early life and education ==
Gable was born Mary Margaret Gable in Wisconsin, and received the name "Mariella" when she entered the Order of Saint Benedict at Saint Benedict's Monastery in St. Joseph, Minnesota, in 1916.

== Career ==
In 1934 she received her PhD from Cornell University, and took a position as chair of the Department of English at the College of Saint Benedict, where she remained until 1958. She was the editor of several anthologies of short stories, including Great Modern Catholic Short Stories (1942), Our Father's House (1945), and Many-Colored Fleece (1950), and wrote numerous essays as well; as a result she played a large role in shaping mid-century opinions of Catholic fiction in the United States and in Europe. She felt that fiction about religious and moral subjects should possess literary value, not merely serve as sentiment.

Among authors whose work she respected were J. F. Powers and Flannery O'Connor; She also introduced such writers as Frank O'Connor, Sean O'Faolain, Mary Lavin, and Bryan MacMahon to American audiences. Gable remained on the faculty of the College of Saint Benedict until 1973. She is honored on campus with a residence hall and a literary prize, both named in her honor.
