= Wheat that Springeth Green =

1988 novel by J. F. Powers

Wheat That Springeth Green is J. F. Powers's last novel. It chronicles the childhood, adolescence, and adulthood of Joe Hackett, a Midwestern Catholic who becomes a priest and dreams of being a saint. Powers worked on the book for 25 years, and was 71 years old when Alfred A. Knopf published it in 1988. A New York Times review praised Powers's "eye for suburban decor and his ear for clerical idiom, American-style". The book was a finalist for the 1988 National Book Award for Fiction. Wheat That Springeth Green was reprinted by Pocket Books in 1990 (ISBN 9780671682217) and republished by The New York Review of Books in 2000.
