= HMS Comus (R43) =

C-class destroyer

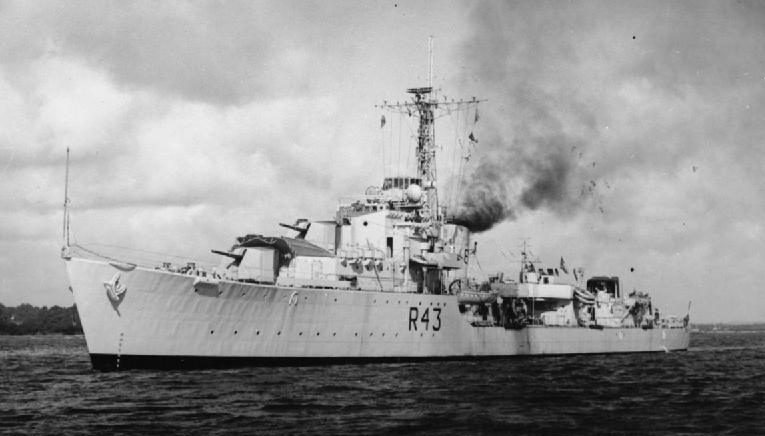
- HMS Comus, 28 June 1946

History

United Kingdom
- Name: HMS Comus
- Builder: John I. Thornycroft & Company
- Laid down: 21 August 1943
- Launched: 14 March 1945
- Commissioned: 8 July 1946
- Home port: Portsmouth
- Identification: Pennant number: R43 (later D20)
- Fate: Scrapped 12 November 1958

General characteristics
- Class & type: C-class destroyer
- Displacement: 1,885 tons (1,915 tonnes); 2,545 tons full (2,585 tonnes)
- Length: 362.75 ft (110.57 m) o/a
- Beam: 35.75 ft (10.90 m)
- Draught: 11.75 ft (3.58 m)
- Propulsion: 2 Admiralty 3-drum boilers, Parsons single-reduction geared steam turbines, 40,000 shp (29.8 MW), 2 shafts
- Speed: 36 knots (67 km/h) / 32 knots (59 km/h) full
- Range: 4,675 nmi (8,658 km) at 20 knots (37 km/h); 1,400 nmi (2,600 km) at 32 knots (59 km/h)
- Complement: 186
- Sensors & processing systems: Radar Type 275 fire control on director Mk.VI
- Armament: 4 × QF 4.5 in (114 mm) L/45 guns Mark IV on mounts CP Mk.V Later reduced to three 4.5s and armed with anti submarine mortars in place of Y turret; 2 × Bofors 40 mm L/60 guns on twin mount Mk V; 4 × anti-aircraft mountings; Single Bofors 40 mm Mk.III; Single QF 2 - pdr Mk.VIII Mk.XVI; Single Oerlikon 20 mm P Mk.III; Twin Oerlikon 20 mm Mk.V; 8 (2x4) tubes for 21 inch (533 mm) torpedoes Mk.IX; 4 throwers and 2 racks for 96 depth charges removed when armed with anti-submarine mortars

HMS Comus was a C-class destroyer of the Royal Navy, built by John I. Thornycroft & Company at Woolston, Southampton. She was launched on 14 March 1945 and commissioned on 8 July 1946.

== Operational service ==
Comus served in the Far East between 1947 and 1957 as part of the 8th Destroyer Squadron.

On 22 August 1950, engaged in the Korean War, she was damaged in the Yellow Sea by two North Korean Ilyushin Il-10. On 4 July 1951, Comus went to the assistance of the British cargo ship Peterstar, which had run aground on the Pratas Reef and had been boarded by pirates.

In 1955 she was engaged in the bombardment of Communist forces as part of the Malayan Emergency.

== Decommissioning and disposal ==
Comus was withdrawn from active service and listed for disposal in 1955. Following her sale Comus arrived at the breakers yard of John Cashmore Ltd for scrapping at Newport, Wales on 12 November 1958.

== Publications ==
- Colledge, J. J.; Warlow, Ben (2006) [1969]. Ships of the Royal Navy: The Complete Record of All Fighting Ships of the Royal Navy from the 15th Century to the Present (3rd Rev ed.). London: Chatham Publishing. ISBN 978-1-86176-281-8. OCLC 67375475.
- Marriott, Leo (1989). Royal Navy Destroyers Since 1945. Ian Allan Ltd. ISBN 0-7110-1817-0.
- Raven, Alan; Roberts, John (1978). War Built Destroyers O to Z Classes. London: Bivouac Books. ISBN 0-85680-010-4.
- Whitley, M. J. (1988). Destroyers of World War 2. Annapolis, Maryland: Naval Institute Press. ISBN 0-87021-326-1.
