= September 1917 =

Month in 1917

<<	September 1917					>>
Su	Mo	Tu	We	Th	Fr	Sa
						1
2	3	4	5	6	7	8
9	10	11	12	13	14	15
16	17	18	19	20	21	22
23	24	25	26	27	28	29
30

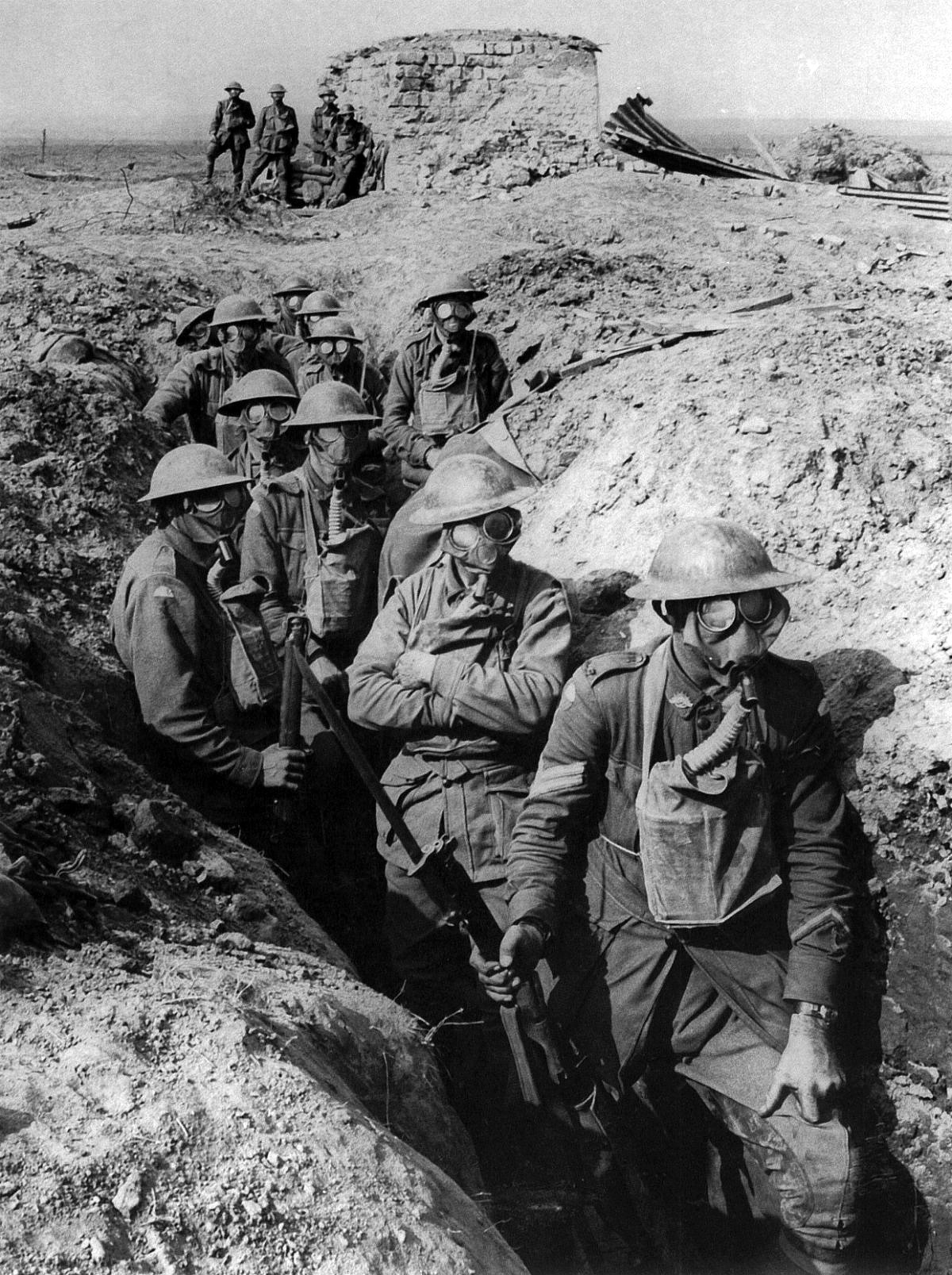
Australian infantry wearing respirators during Battle of Polygon Wood.

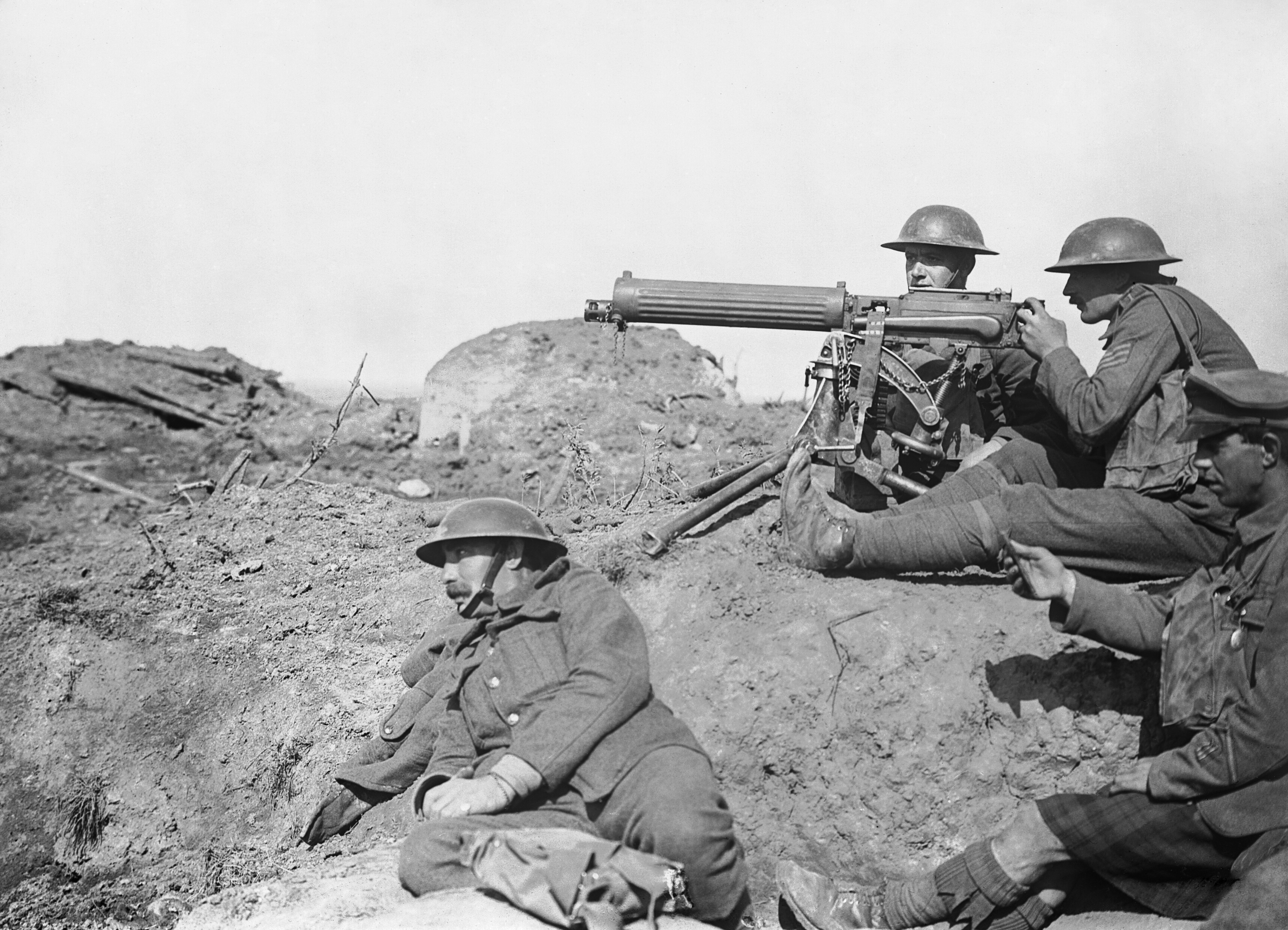
Soldiers using machine guns in the Battle of Passchendaele - September 1917.

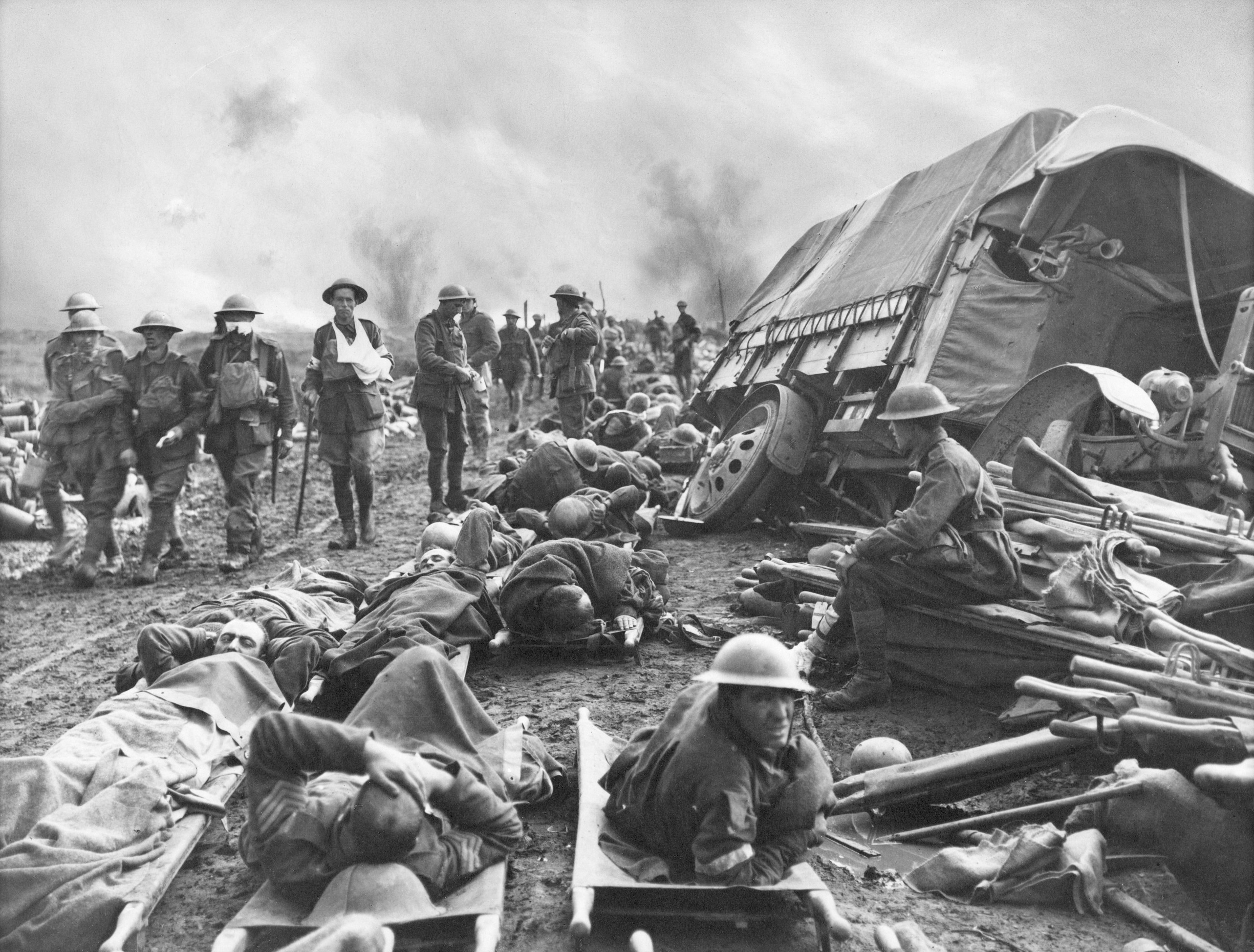
Wounded men at the side of a road after the Battle of the Menin Road Ridge.

The following events occurred in September 1917:

== September 1, 1917 (Saturday) ==
- Battle of Jugla – The Russian Twelfth Army fortified the banks of the Mazā Jugla river in Latvia in an attempt to slow the German Eighth Army advance on Riga and allow most of the force to escape.
- The United States Army established Camp Lewis as a training camp for recruits serving in World War I. The camp began permanent and renamed Fort Lewis in 1927. Around this time, the 80th and 81st Infantry Divisions were established.
- The Royal Flying Corps established air squadrons No. 89, No. 91, No. 92, and No. 103.
- The Port Huron and Detroit Railroad was incorporated to own and operate 14 miles (22 km) of railroad track along the St. Clair River from Port Huron, Michigan to Marine City, Michigan.
- The Alberta Farmers' Co-operative Elevator Company merged with the Grain Growers' Grain Company to form United Grain Growers, which provided grain marketing, handling and supply for farmers in the Canadian Prairies.
- Morinaga Milk Industry was established in Tokyo, with its current products distributed in North America through Kraft Foods.
- Born:
  - Lewis C. Dowdy, American academic, 6th President of North Carolina A&T State University; in Eastover, South Carolina, United States (d. 2000)

== September 2, 1917 (Sunday) ==
- Battle of Jugla – A force of 6,000 Latvian Riflemen withstood the brunt of the German attack for 26 hours, allowing the rest of the Russian Twelfth Army to retreat from Riga.
- An explosion on a British cargo ship carrying munitions struck and sank attacking German submarine SM U-28, killing all 39 crew on board.
- British armed cargo ship HMS Dundee was torpedoed and damaged in the Atlantic Ocean by German submarine SM UC-49, killing nine crew before she sank the next day.
- U.S. military air base Scott Field was established in St. Clair County, Illinois.
- The German Fatherland Party was established to represent ultra-conservative groups opposed to the Reichstag Peace Resolution made on July 19. Although the party grew to have more than 1.25 million members in 1918, it was dissolved in the German Revolution the same year.
- The present stone building of the Makawao Union Church was dedicated in Makawao, Hawaii, It was added to the National Register of Historic Places listings in Hawaii in 1985.
- The newspaper Trinidad and Tobago Guardian released its first edition, the first newspaper published in Trinidad and Tobago.
- Born:
  - Laurindo Almeida, Brazilian jazz musician, credited for creating the music genre jazz samba; as Laurindo José de Araújo Almeida Nobrega Neto, in São Paulo, Brazil (d. 1995)
  - Cleveland Amory, American writer and activist, known for his activism in animal rights and children's works including The Cat Who Came for Christmas; in Nahant, Massachusetts, United States (d. 1998)
  - Bodil Kjer, Danish actress, known for her film roles in Jenny and the Soldier and Babette's Feast; in Odense, Denmark (d. 2003)
- Died: Boris Shturmer, 69, Russian state leader, 6th Prime Minister of Russia (b. 1848)

== September 3, 1917 (Monday) ==
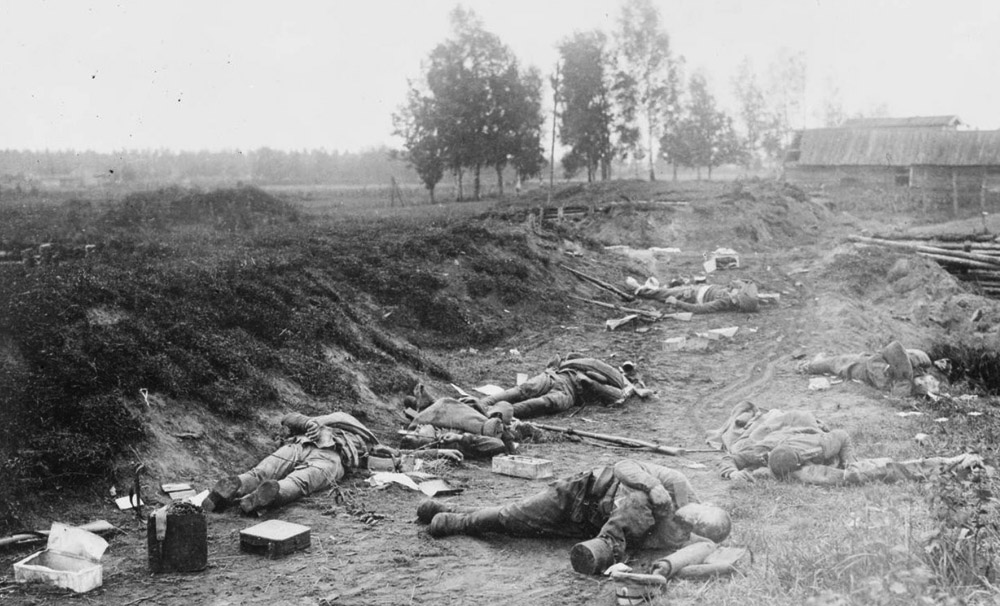
Russian infantrymen killed by chemical weapons during the Battle of Jugla near Riga, Latvia, September 1917.

- Battle of Jugla – The Latvian Riflemen force lost half of its unit before retreating, as the rest of the Russian Twelfth Army retreated to Vidzeme, Latvia. The German Eighth Army entered Riga the same day. Russian forces in total suffered 25,000 casualties while German casualties were minimum at 5,000.
- The Luftstreitkräfte (German Air Force) launched its first night raid, sending five Gotha bombers to attack Chatham Dockyard in Kent, England. The raid killed 152 people, including 130 Royal Navy recruits when a bomb hit their barracks (the highest death toll inflicted by a single aerial bomb during World War I).
- United States Army 1st Aero Squadron arrived in France.
- Royal Navy minesweeper HMS Begonia sank with the loss of 94 crew.
- German submarine SM U-66 disappeared and likely sank after striking a mine in the North Sea with all 40 crew on board lost.
- During the final days of the Battle of Mărășești, Romania lost its most famous partisan fighter and national hero, Ecaterina Teodoroiu, who was killed by machine gun fire.
- Born: G. V. Iyer, Indian film director, known for films Bhagavad Gita and Swami Vivekananda; as Ganapathi Venkataramana Iyer, in Nanjangud, British India (present-day India) (d. 2003)

== September 4, 1917 (Tuesday) ==
- The Luftstreitkräfte (German Air Force) launched a second night raid against the United Kingdom, sending 11 Gotha bombers to raid London. Only five bombers made it to London where 18 Sopwith Camel aircraft were scrambled to intercept. Although neither side met up, the attempted raid proved Sopwith Camel airplanes could operate well at night.
- The Royal Flying Corps established air squadron No. 104.
- The first federal reserve bank for Nebraska opened in Omaha.
- New York City transit stations for the BMT Broadway Line, including Canal Street, Eighth Street, 14th Street and Prince Street were opened for service.
- Born: Henry Ford II, American auto executive, CEO of the Ford Motor Company from 1945 to 1979, son of Edsel Ford and grandson of Henry Ford; in Detroit, United States (d. 1987)

== September 5, 1917 (Wednesday) ==
- The Third Zimmerwald Conference held in Stockholm was the final conference for the anti-war socialist Zimmerwald Movement.
- German submarine SM U-88 struck a mine and sank in the North Sea off the Netherlands with the loss of all 43 crew.
- French passenger ship SS Alesia was torpedoed and damaged in the Atlantic Ocean by German submarine SM UC-69. She was abandoned and sunk the next day by German U-boat SM UC-50.
- The United States Army established Camp Devens in Middlesex County, Massachusetts as a temporary training base for soldiers mobilizing for World War I. It became the permanent army base of Fort Devens in 1931.
- The Royal Flying Corps established air squadron No. 192.
- Born:
  - Art Rupe, American music executive, founder of Specialty Records; as Arthur Goldberg, in Greensburg, Pennsylvania, United States
  - Marty Links, American cartoonist, creator of Emmy Lou; as Martha B. Links, in Oakland, California, United States (d. 2008)

== September 6, 1917 (Thursday) ==
- Vice-Admiral Sir Rosslyn Wemyss was appointed Deputy First Sea Lord for the British Admiralty, only to be relieved on September 27 by Vice-Admiral Herbert L. Heath. The position existed for the duration of both world wars.
- At the National Eisteddfod of Wales, held in Birkenhead, England, the Chairing of the Bard ceremony ended dramatically with the honorary chair being draped in black to signify that the winner, Hedd Wyn, had died a month earlier in battle.
- Daily newspaper Echo in Lithuania released its first edition.
- The unfinished Henry James novels The Ivory Tower and The Sense of the Past were both published by Collins in the United Kingdom and Scribners in the United States.
- Born:
  - Philipp von Boeselager, German army officer, member of the 20 July plot to assassinate Adolf Hitler, recipient of the Order of Merit; in Burg Heimerzheim, German Empire (present-day Heimerzheim, Germany) (d. 2008)
  - Yao Yilin, Chinese state leader, 5th Vice Premier of the People's Republic of China; as William Yiu Hak-kwong, in British Hong Kong (present-day Hong Kong) (d. 1994)
  - Basanti Dulal Nagchaudhuri, Indian physicist, designer of first cyclotron in India at the University of Calcutta; in Dhaka District, British India (present-day Bangladesh) (d. 2006)

== September 7, 1917 (Friday) ==
- Battle of Verdun – France launched a second offensive against Germany near Verdun, France, to capitalize on gains made in August.
- British ocean liner Minnehaha was torpedoed and sunk in the Atlantic Ocean by German submarine SM U-48, killing 43 people on board.
- The Port Victoria aircraft was first flown.
- The Luftstreitkräfte established air squadrons Jagdstaffel 42 and 76.
- Born:
  - Leonard Cheshire, British air force officer, recipient of the Victoria Cross and Distinguished Flying Cross; as Geoffrey Leonard Cheshire, in Chester, England (d. 1992)
  - John Cornforth, Australian chemist, recipient of the Nobel Prize in Chemistry for his research in stereochemistry; in Sydney, Australia (d. 2013)
  - Tetsuo Hamuro, Japanese swimmer, gold medalist at the 1936 Summer Olympics; in Fukuoka, Empire of Japan (present-day Japan) (d. 2005)
  - Jacob Lawrence, American painter, known for works including the Migration Series; in Atlantic City, New Jersey, United States (d. 2000)

== September 8, 1917 (Saturday) ==
- Battle of Mărășești – Romanian and Russian forces successfully held off a massive German offensive on the Siret River near Mărășești, Romania, resulting in an estimated 60,000 to 65,000 enemy casualties. The Allies suffered 53,060 casualties including 12,208 killed, 22,867 wounded, and 17,985 missing.
- Battle of Verdun – French forces captured several German trenches before counter-battery from enemy artillery forced the attack to be called off.

== September 9, 1917 (Sunday) ==
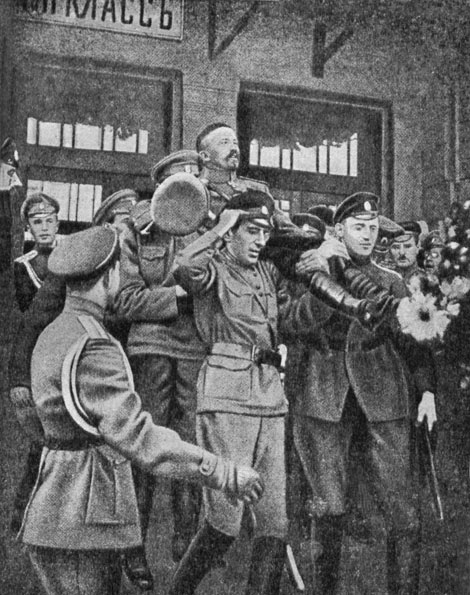
General Lavr Kornilov greeted by his officers during his attempted coup in Russia.

- A military coup led by Russian General Lavr Kornilov was thwarted when Vikzhel, the governing body for Russia's large railway union, issued orders from its members to intercept all telegram messages made by coup participants and delay any trains transporting Russian soldiers.
- A nationwide general strike involving 100,000 industrial workers throughout Australia officially ended following a decision between union leaders and the Australian board, although it would be another two weeks before most strikers resumed work.
- British soldiers stationed at French port of Étaples mutinied over conditions in the training camp.
- The 14th Army of the Imperial German Army was established.
- Died: Madge Syers, 35, British figure skater, first woman to compete in the World Figure Skating Championships, gold medalist in the 1908 Summer Olympics (b. 1881)

== September 10, 1917 (Monday) ==
- German submarine UC-42 was sunk in Cork Harbour, Ireland, probably by one of her own mines, with the loss of 26 crew.
- American stage actress Elsie Ferguson made her screen debut in the historical drama Barbary Sheep, directed by Maurice Tourneur. Adapted from the novel of the same name by Robert Hichens, the movie was distributed by Famous Players–Lasky.
- Russian composer Sergei Prokofiev completed the Classical Symphony, and would premier in Petrograd the following year.
- Born:
  - Miguel Serrano, Chilean diplomat, served as ambassador for three administrations from 1953 to 1970; in Santiago, Chile (d. 2009)
  - Masahiko Kimura, Japanese wrestler, eight-time champion in judo wrestling; in Kumamoto, Empire of Japan (present-day Japan) (d. 1993)
  - Helen Codere, Canadian-American anthropologist, best known for her work with the Kwakwakaʼwakw indigenous people of coastal British Columbia; in Winnipeg, Canada (d. 2009)

== September 11, 1917 (Tuesday) ==
- The attempt by Russian General Lavr Kornilov to take over the Russian Provisional Government by military coup ended in failure.
- German submarine SM U-49 was rammed, shelled and sunk in the Bay of Biscay by British Transport, with the loss of all 43 crew.
- French flying ace Georges Guynemer went missing in action while flying a SPAD aircraft during combat with German aircraft near Poelkapelle, Belgium. German ace Kurt Wisserman of Jagdstaffel 3 was credited with shooting him down, but Guynemer's body was never found. Guynemer had 54 kills at the time of his death.
- The village of Edgerton, Alberta was incorporated.
- Torrance High School opened for secondary students in Torrance, California. The original main building and three others are listed in the National Register of Historic Places.
- The Bellevue Conference was held.
- Born:
  - Herbert Lom, Czech-British actor, best known for his comedic roles in The Ladykillers and The Pink Panther film series; as Herbert Charles Angelo Kuchačevič ze Schluderpacheru, in Prague, Kingdom of Bohemia, Austria-Hungary (present-day Czech Republic) (d. 2012)
  - Jessica Mitford, British-American non-fiction writer, author of Hons and Rebels and The American Way of Death, member of the aristocratic Mitford family; as Jessica Lucy Freeman-Mitford, in Gloucestershire, England (d. 1996)
  - Daniel Wildenstein, French art dealer and racehorse owner, third member of the family to preside over Wildenstein & Company, four-time winner of the Prix de l'Arc de Triomphe in horse racing; in Paris, France (d. 2001)
  - Ferdinand Marcos, Filipino state leader, 10th President of the Philippines; in Sarrat, Philippine Islands (present-day Philippines) (d. 1989)
  - Donald Blakeslee, American air force pilot, one of the most decorated pilots of World War II and the Korean War, including seven Distinguished Flying Crosses, two Silver Stars, two Distinguished Service Crosses, six Air Medals and the Legion of Merit; in Fairport Harbor, Ohio, United States (d. 2008)

== September 12, 1917 (Wednesday) ==
- Eleventh Battle of the Isonzo – The Italian offensive against Austria-Hungary along Isonzo River in northern Italy ended with some key Austro-Hungarian defenses remaining unconquered. Italy suffered massive casualties, with 30,000 dead, 108,000 wounded and 20,000 missing or taken prisoner. Austria-Hungary had 20,000 dead, 45,000 wounded, 30,000 missing, and 20,000 taken prisoner.
- Alexandre Ribot resigned as Prime Minister of France for the fourth and final time and was replaced by Paul Painlevé.
- A force of 400 men from the Honourable Artillery Company ended the mutiny of British soldiers at the Étaples base in France.
- German submarine SM U-45 was torpedoed and sunk in the Atlantic Ocean by Royal Navy submarine HMS D7 with the loss of 43 of her 45 crew.
- Born:
  - Silvino Barsana Agudo, Filipino politician, Governor of the Batanes province in the Philippines from 1968 to 1971; in Tuguegarao, Philippine Islands (present-day Philippines) (d. 2010)
  - John E. Anderson, American financial leader and philanthropist, owner of Topa Equities, Ltd. and donor to major hospitals in Los Angeles, recipient of the Humanitarian Award from the National Conference for Community and Justice; in Minneapolis, United States (d. 2011)
  - Pierre Sévigny, Canadian politician, Member of Parliament for Longueuil from 1957 to 1963, key figure in the Munsinger affair that forced him to resign; as Joseph Pierre Albert Sévigny, in Quebec City, Canada (d. 2004)
  - Russ Christopher, American baseball player, pitcher for the Philadelphia Athletics from 1942 to 1947 and the Cleveland Indians when the team won the 1948 World Series; as Russell Ormand Christopher, in Richmond, California, United States (d. 1954)
  - Charles Jones, Australian politician, cabinet minister for the second and third Whitlam ministry; in Newcastle, New South Wales, Australia (d. 2003)

== September 13, 1917 (Thursday) ==
- German submarine SM UC-21 left port from Zeebrugge, Belgium, for the Bay of Biscay but disappeared after that date, with all 26 crew presumed lost.
- The comedy-drama The Gulf Between, starring Grace Darmond and Niles Welch, was the first movie feature made in Technicolor, then a two-color process, and the fourth color film to be released. Only fragments of it survive at the Margaret Herrick Library, George Eastman Museum, and the National Museum of American History.
- Born: Robert Ward, American composer, known for his works including the opera The Crucible (based on the Arthur Miller play), which received a Pulitzer Prize for Music; in Cleveland, United States (d. 2013)

== September 14, 1917 (Friday) ==
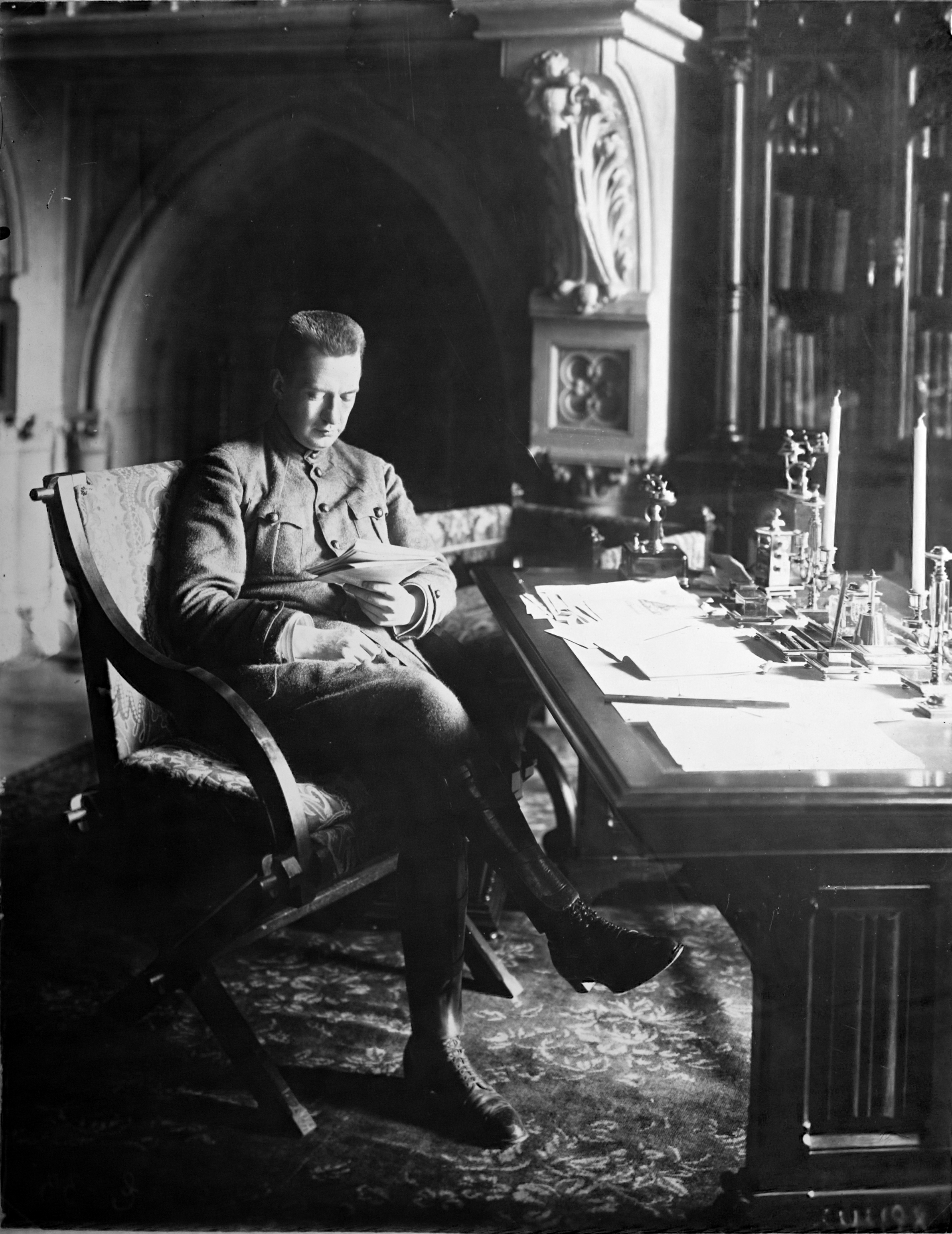
Russian president Alexander Kerensky in his office

- Russia was declared a republic by the Russian Provisional Government, with Alexander Kerensky as president.
- Catholic secondary school Colegio del Sagrado Corazon de Jesus was established in Iloilo City, Philippines by the Daughters of Charity.
- The musical The Boy, by Fred Thompson and Percy Greenbank with music by Lionel Monckton and Howard Talbot, premiered at the Adelphi Theatre in London and ran 801 performances, the longest running show up until that point.
- The Fairey aircraft was first flown.
- The California State Fair hosted the last California State Fair Special train wreck in Sacramento, involving two trains with coal cars attached smashing head-on for spectators. This event originally started in 1913.
- Born:
  - Ettore Sottsass, Italian designer, best known for his furniture and office designs created through his firm Sottsass Associati; in Innsbruck, Austria-Hungary (present-day Austria) (d. 2007)
  - Joyce Chen, Chinese-American chef, best known for promoting Beijing cuisine in the United States through her successful Joyce Chen Cook Book series and Joyce Chen Cooks television shows on PBS; as Liao Chia-ai, in Beijing, Republic of China (present-day China) (d. 1994)
  - Heinrich Ehrler, German air force officer, pilot of the Luftwaffe during World War II with over 200 credited kills, recipient of the Knight's Cross of the Iron Cross; in Oberbalbach, German Empire (present-day Lauda-Königshofen, Germany) (d. 1945, killed in action)

== September 15, 1917 (Saturday) ==
- German ace Kurt Wolff was shot down and killed in his Fokker airplane during a dogfight with Royal Flying Corps Sopwith Camels north of Wervicq, Belgium. His 33 kills tied him with compatriots Otto Könnecke and Heinrich Bongartz as the 20th-highest-scoring German ace of World War I.
- Financial columnist B. C. Forbes published the first issue of Forbes magazine.
- The South Fremantle Football Club defeated East Fremantle 41 to 26 to win their second consecutive West Australian Football League premiership.
- Born:
  - Shan-ul-Haq Haqqee, Pakistani poet, best known for his collections Tar-i-Pairahan and Harf-i-Dilras; in Delhi, British India (present-day India) (d. 2005)
  - Buddy Jeannette, American basketball player and coach, guard and coach for the Baltimore Bullets when it won the Basketball Association of America final in 1948; as Harry Edward Jeannette, in New Kensington, Pennsylvania, United States (d. 1998)
  - Richard Arnell, British composer, known for compositions including Landscapes and Figures and film scores for The Visit; in Hampstead, London, England (d. 2009)
  - Alf Pike, Canadian hockey player, left wing and centre for the New York Rangers from 1939 to 1947; as Alfred George Pike, in Winnipeg, Canada (d. 2009)

== September 16, 1917 (Sunday) ==
- The general election in Sweden saw the liberal Swedish Social Democratic Party gain control of the Parliament of Sweden from the conservative Electoral League, winning 86 of the 230 seats in the Riksdag.
- Royal Navy submarine HMS G9 was rammed and sunk at night in the North Sea by fellow navy destroyer HMS Pasley after the submarine had mistaken Pasley for a U-boat and fired two torpedoes at her. All but one of her 31 crew were killed with the survivor rescued (although initially assumed to be a German prisoner of war).
- The cornerstone of the Archbishop Quigley Preparatory Seminary was laid in Chicago, with the building complete and classes commencing in November 1918.

== September 17, 1917 (Monday) ==
- German submarine SM UC-45 sank in the North Sea with the loss of all 35 crew. She was later salvaged, repaired and returned to service.
- The first Medal of Honor of World War I was awarded to shipfitter Patrick McGunigal of U.S. Navy armored cruiser Huntington after he rescued crew member H. W. Hoyt from a kite balloon that blew away in bad weather while the ship was on an escort mission in the Atlantic Ocean.
- The National Federation of Federal Employees was formed in Washington, D.C. and now represents some 100,000 federal government employees.
- The Junkers J 7, a prototype of the Junkers aircraft, was first flown.
- Born:
  - Tim Ward, English football player, midfielder for various clubs including Derby from 1935 to 1953 and the England national football team from 1947 to 1948, managed clubs Barnsley and Derby from 1953 to 1968; as Victor Timothy Ward, in Cheltenham, England (d. 1993)
  - Isang Yun, Korean composer, known for orchestral works including My Land, My People and Exemplum in Memoriam Kwangju; in Sansei, Japanese Korea (present-day Sancheong County, South Korea) (d. 1995)

== September 18, 1917 (Tuesday) ==
- The Vilnius Conference was held to discuss the formation of an independent Lithuania from the Russian Empire.
- British cargo ship Port Kembla struck a mine and sank in the Atlantic Ocean off Cape Farewell, Greenland with all crew rescued. A sizable shipment of goods, including 1,200 tonnes of lead, went down with the ship. Plans to recover the metal occurred as recently as 2012.
- Born:
  - June Foray, American voice actress, best known for the voice of Rocky the Flying Squirrel; as June Lucille Forer, in Springfield, Massachusetts, United States (d. 2017)
  - Francis Parker Yockey, American author and lawyer, proponent of white nationalism and the New Right; in Chicago, United States (d. 1960)

== September 19, 1917 (Wednesday) ==
- Sylvania Electronics, known for developing the first fluorescent lamp tubes, the first flash cubes for cameras, and some of the cathode ray tubes for some of the early color television sets, was incorporated in the United States as the Hygrade Lamp Company.
- The French ship Blanche became the first victim of the German U-boat U-151, torpedoed and sunk with the loss of all 18 of her crew. On th esame day, the British cargo ship Saint Ronald was sunk by U-82 with the loss of 24 of her crew.
- Born:
  - Paterson Clarence Hughes, Australian air force officer, highest-scoring Australian flying ace during the Battle of Britain, recipient of the Distinguished Flying Cross; in Cooma, Australia (d. 1940, killed in action)
  - Edward Tyrer, British law enforcer, Commissioner of Police during the 1967 Hong Kong riots; as Edward Tyrer Egg, in British Guiana (present-day Guyana) (d. 2004)
  - Amalia Hernández, Mexican choreographer, founder of Ballet Folklórico de México; in Mexico City, Mexico (d. 2000)

== September 20, 1917 (Thursday) ==
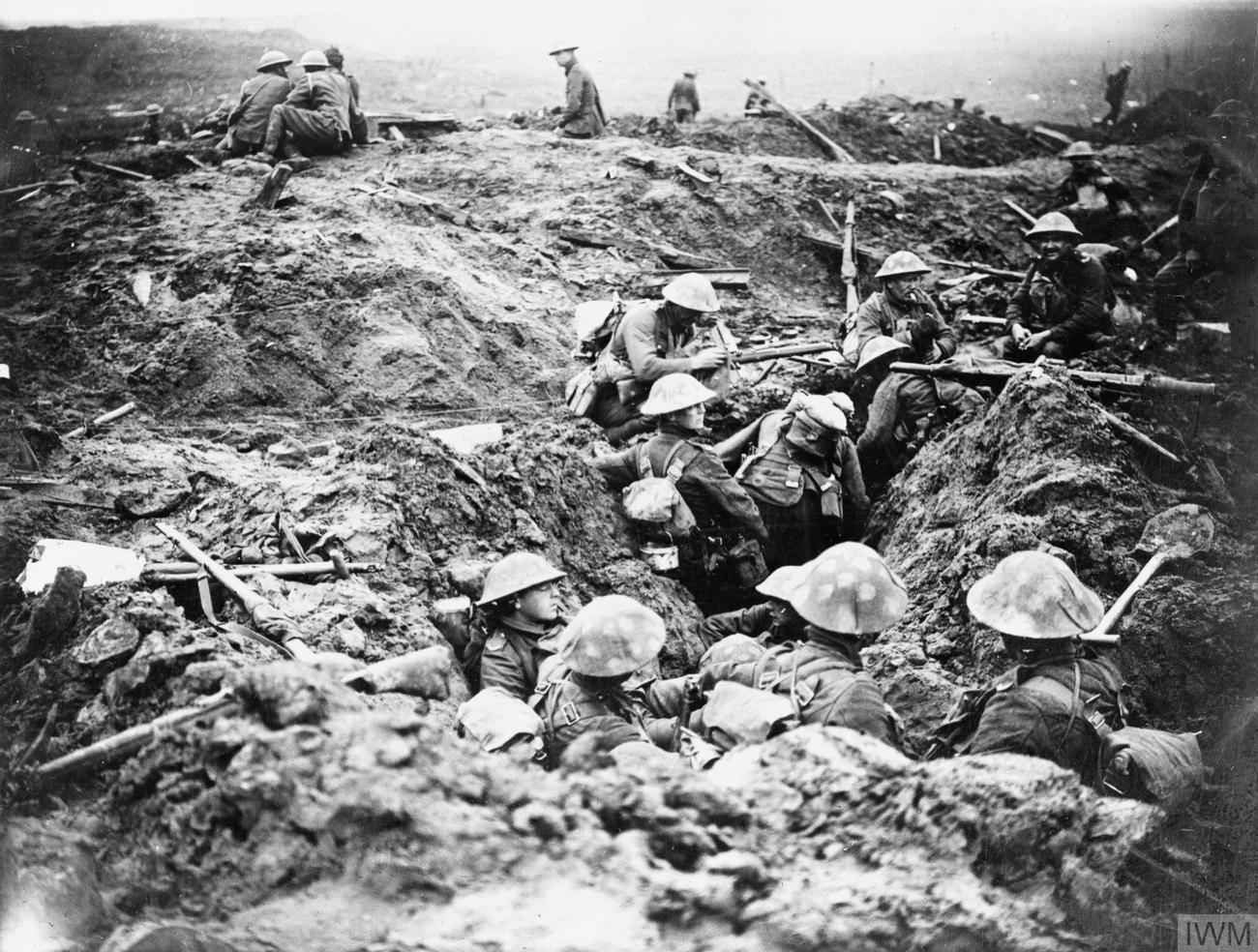
British soldiers resting in trenches during the Battle of the Menin Road Ridge, 20 September 1917

- Battle of the Menin Road Ridge – British and Commonwealth troops with the British Second and Fifth Armies attacked the German Fourth Army in West Flanders, Belgium, capturing Wurst Farm and other key defensive positions along Menin Road Ridge.
- The Income War Tax Act received royal assent in Canada, establishing a "temporary" tax, which remains in force to this day.
- The Wartime Elections Act gave female relatives of Canadian servicemen the right to vote.
- A tropical storm developed about 160 miles (260 km) northeast of Barbados but strengthened when it crossed Saint Lucia and Martinique islands several hours later. It would become a Category 1 hurricane in 24 hours.
- Born:
  - Red Auerbach, American basketball coach, led the Boston Celtics to nine NBA championships from 1950 to 1966; as Arnold Auerbach, in New York City, United States (d. 2006)
  - Fernando Rey, Spanish actor, best known for his collaborations with director Luis Buñuel including Tristana, The Discreet Charm of the Bourgeoisie, and That Obscure Object of Desire, as well as the drug lord in The French Connection; as Fernando Casado Arambillet, in A Coruña, Spain (d. 1994)
  - Abdel Latif Boghdadi, Egyptian politician, Vice-President of Egypt from 1958 to 1961; in El Mansoura, Sultanate of Egypt (present-day Mansoura, Egypt) (d. 1999)
- Died: Jack Cooper, 28, Australian rules footballer, half-back for the Fitzroy Football Club from 1907 to 1915; killed in action at the Battle of Passchendaele (b. 1889)

== September 21, 1917 (Friday) ==
- Hermann Göring, commander of German air squadron Jagdstaffel 27 and future commander of the Luftwaffe in World War II, shot down British pilot Ralph Curtis during a dogfight over Flanders, Belgium. Curtis died later from his wounds while in German custody. He had fifteen aerial victories to his name.
- The United States Army established the 139th Aero Squadron at Kelly Field, San Antonio.
- The Nueva Gerona hurricane formed in the Caribbean Sea, forcing the U.S. Weather Bureau to issue advisories.
- Died:
  - Frederick Birks, 23, Australian army officer, recipient of the Victoria Cross for action during the Battle of the Menin Road Ridge; killed in action (b. 1894)
  - Francis Aylmer Maxwell, 46, British army officer, recipient of the Victoria Cross for action during the Second Boer War; killed in action at the Battle of the Menin Road Ridge (b. 1871)

== September 22, 1917 (Saturday) ==
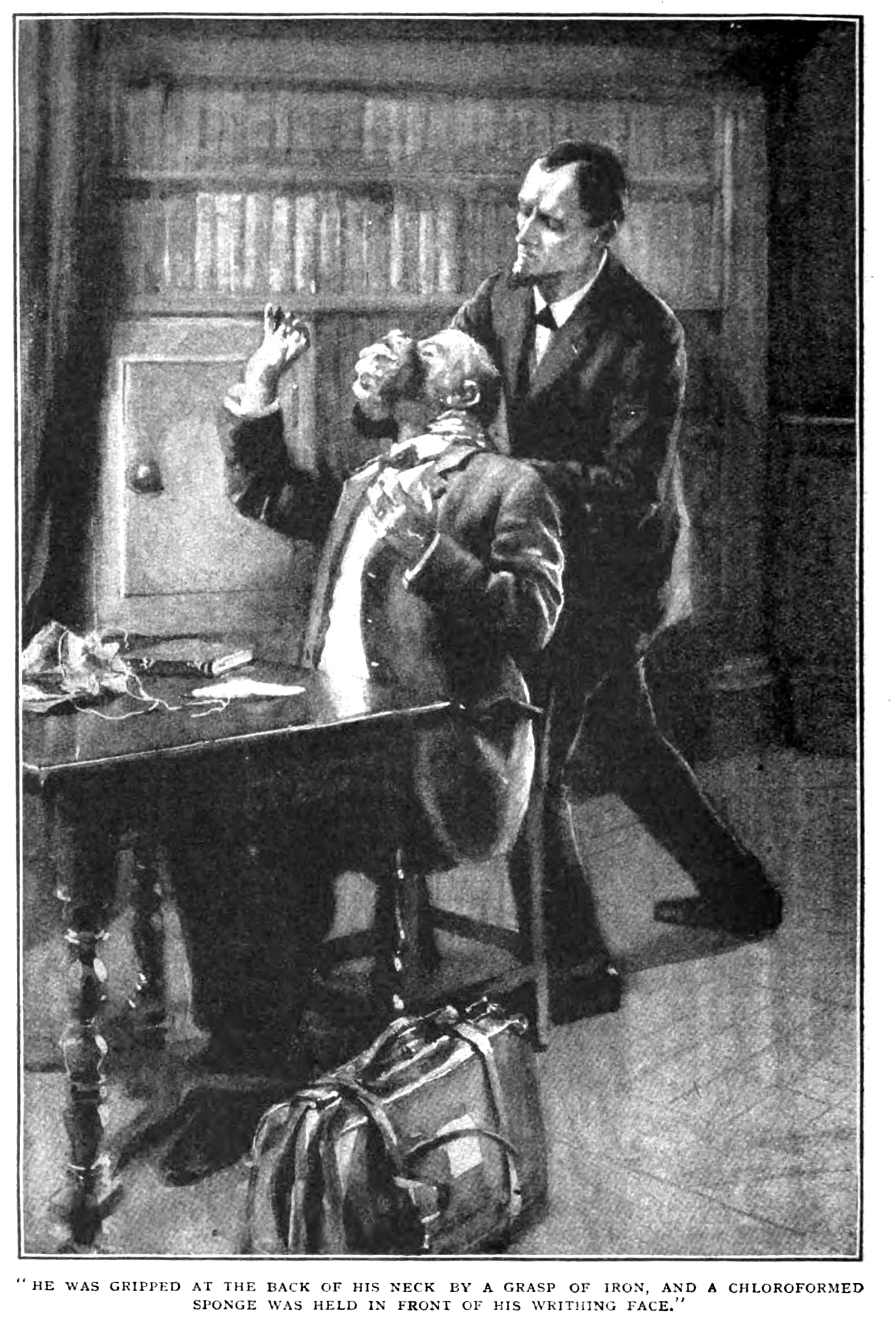
The disguised Sherlock Holmes chloroforms German agent Von Bork in "His Last Bow".

- The Vilnius Conference established the Council of Lithuania to pursue the secession of Lithuania from the Russian Empire.
- A Royal Naval Air Service Curtiss seaplane sank German submarine SM UB-32 in the North Sea, the only confirmed instance of a British aircraft sinking a German submarine without the assistance of surface ships during World War I.
- The Nueva Gerona hurricane strengthened to Category 2 while passing just south of Haiti.
- The Collingwood Football Club defeated Fitzroy at Melbourne Cricket Ground to win the 21st VFL Premiership.
- The American comedy-drama Rebecca of Sunnybrook Farm was released, with Mary Pickford in the starring role and directed by Marshall Neilan. Screenwriter Frances Marion adapted it from the novel by Kate Douglas Wiggin. The film became Pickford's fourth hit of the year and the second-biggest film at the box office for 1917.
- The Sherlock Holmes story His Last Bow was published in The Strand Magazine.
- Born: Richard C. Hottelet, American journalist, final surviving member of the Murrow Boys at CBS News; in New York City, United States (d. 2014)
- Died: John Henry Knight, 70, British engineer, invented one of the first petrol-powered automobiles in the United Kingdom (b. 1847)

== September 23, 1917 (Sunday) ==
German flying ace Werner Voss

- The Nueva Gerona hurricane struck the northern coast of Jamaica. Heavy winds damaged crops and structures on plantations, and nine people were killed when high winds struck Port Antonio. The United States Weather Bureau issued warnings along the Florida coast from West Palm Beach to Boca Grande.
- French troopship SS Medie was sunk in the Mediterranean Sea off the coast of Algeria by German submarine SM UC-27 with the loss of 250 of the 626 people on board.
- During an epic 10-minute dogfight against six aircraft of the Royal Flying Corps No. 56 Squadron, German flying ace Werner Voss was shot down and killed in his Fokker triplane by British ace Arthur Rhys-Davids. At the time of his death, Voss has 48 victories and was the second-leading German ace behind Manfred von Richthofen; Voss would eventually be the fourth-highest-scoring German ace of World War I.
- The Royal Flying Corps established air squadron No. 105.
- The Barossa Valley railway line was completed in South Australia.
- Born:
  - Rodolfo Guzmán Huerta, Mexican wrestler, better known as El Santo; in Tulancingo, Mexico (d. 1984)
  - Asima Chatterjee, Indian chemist, noted researcher into organic chemistry and phytochemistry that lead to development of drugs to treat epilepsy and malaria; in Calcutta, British India (present-day Kolkata, India) (d. 2006)
  - Knut Haugland, Norwegian explorer, resistance fighter of Operation Gunnerside during World War II, member of the Kon-Tiki expedition in 1947; in Rjukan, Norway (d. 2009)
- Died: Robert Swain Peabody, 72, American architect, co-founder of the firm Peabody and Stearns (b. 1845)

== September 24, 1917 (Monday) ==
- A group of New Zealand soldiers were struck by an oncoming train when they disembarked on the wrong side of their passenger car at Bere Ferrers railway station in Devon, England. Nine men were killed instantly and another later died of injuries in the hospital.
- Nine German Navy Zeppelins attempted an attack on the middle and north of England but only L 35 made it in, dropping her bombs near Rotherham. Total damage inflicted by the raid was £2,210.
- Sixteen German Gotha bombers set out to raid the United Kingdom; five reached London and another eight bombed targets in Dover, Kent, England.
- The Nueva Gerona hurricane intensified to Category 3 when it reached Cayman Brac.
- Born:
  - William Bundy, American public servant, foreign affairs adviser to U.S. Presidents John F. Kennedy and Lyndon B. Johnson; in Boston, United States (d. 2000)
  - Doud Eisenhower, first son of Dwight D. Eisenhower and Mamie Eisenhower; in San Antonio, United States (d. 1921)

== September 25, 1917 (Tuesday) ==
- Battle of the Menin Road Ridge – British forces repulsed a German counterattack to secure their capture of German trenches and defense points along Menin Road Ridge in West Flanders, Belgium, at a cost of 20,255 casualties.
- Fifteen German Gotha bombers set out to bomb London, but only three reached the city. British pilots Douglas John Bell and George Williams of the Royal Flying Corps's No. 78 Squadron shot down one of the bombers in the North Sea using a Sopwith Strutter.
- The Nueva Gerona hurricane reached Category 4 when it hit Cuba and entered the Gulf of Mexico. It devastated the village of Nueva Gerona, leaving only 10 homes standing and causing a total 20 deaths through Cuba. Cuban president Mario García Menocal declared the area a disaster and appealed for aid from the United States.
- The 2nd Special Operations Squadron was established at Fort Omaha, Nebraska.
- Born:
  - Johnny Sain, American baseball player, pitcher for the Boston Braves in three World Series, coached the New York Yankees, Detroit Tigers and Minnesota Twins to World Series wins; as John Sain, in Havana, Arkansas, United States (d. 2006)
  - Phil Rizzuto, American baseball player, shortstop for the New York Yankees from 1941 to 1956; as Philip Francis Rizzuto, in New York City, United States (d. 2007)
- Died:
  - Thomas Ashe, 32, Irish activist, founding member of the Irish Volunteers; died as a result of being force-fed while on a hunger strike (b. 1885)
  - Frano Supilo, 46, Croatian politician, member of Croatian Parliament from 1906 to 1910, founding member of the Yugoslav Committee; died of a stroke (b. 1870)

== September 26, 1917 (Wednesday) ==
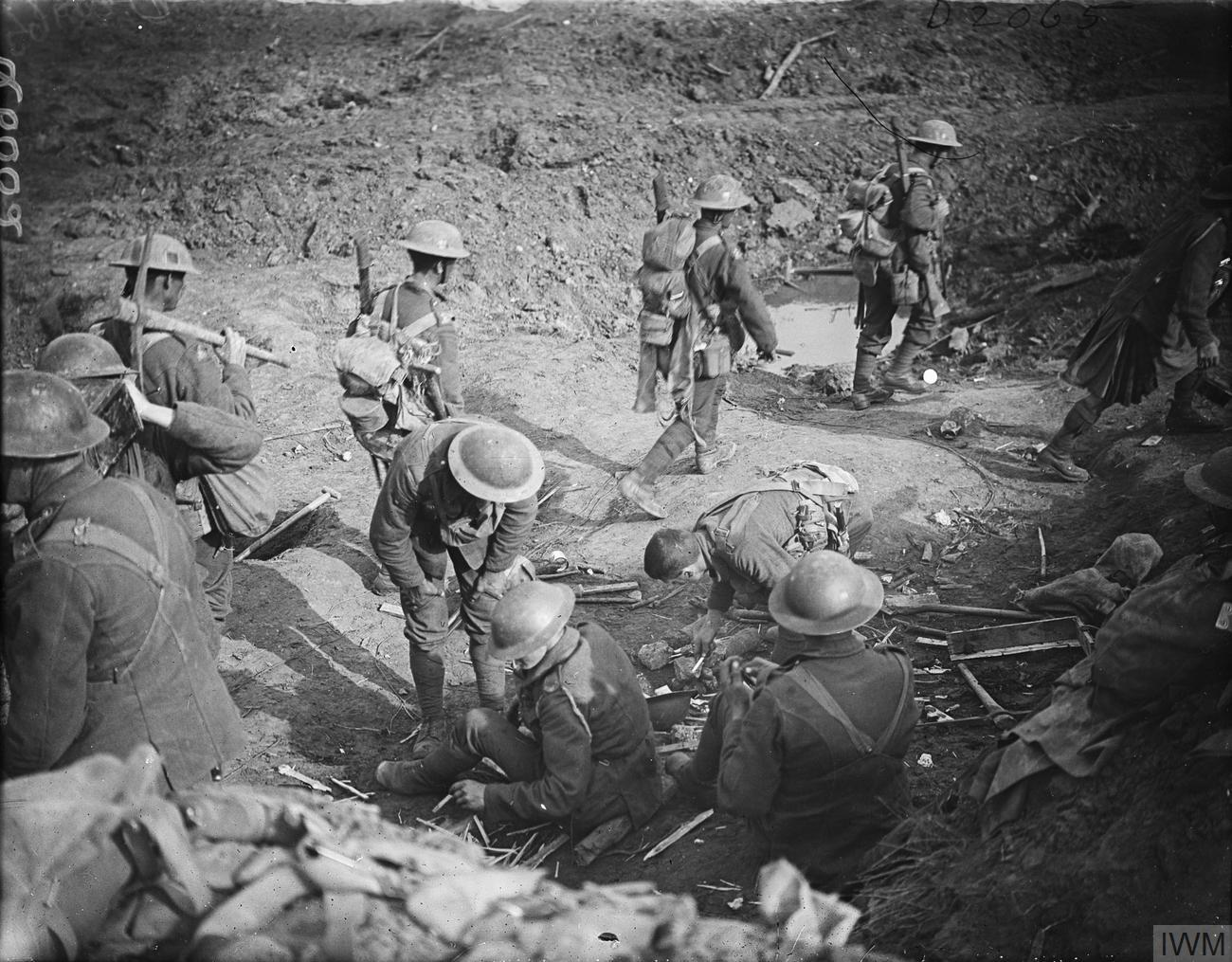
British troops prepare for attack the day before the Battle of Polygon Wood, 25 September 1917

- Battle of Polygon Wood – Seven British and two Australian divisions under command of General Herbert Plumer launched a new offensive against the Germans in West Flanders, Belgium, following successes from the Battle of the Menin Road Ridge, with plans to push the German defensive back from the ridge to Polygon Wood, named for its geometric shape on military maps.
- French cargo ship Jacqueline was torpedoed and sunk in the Atlantic Ocean by German submarine SM U-101 with the loss of all 35 crew.
- German submarine SM UC-33 was shelled, rammed and sunk in St George's Channel by a British patrol boat with the loss of 27 of her 28 crew.
- Born:
  - Réal Caouette, Canadian politician, founder of the ralliement créditiste movement in Quebec; as David Réal Caouette, in Amos, Quebec, Canada (d. 1976)
  - Harrison Brown, American chemist, member of the Manhattan Project, advocate for nuclear arms limitation; in Sheridan, Wyoming, United States (d. 1986)
  - Thurman Tucker, American baseball player, center fielder for the Chicago White Sox from 1942 to 1947 and the Cleveland Indians when the club won the 1948 World Series; in Gordon, Texas, United States (d. 1993)
- Died:
  - Hans von Blixen-Finecke, 31, Swedish equestrian, bronze medalist at the 1912 Summer Olympics, twin brother to Bror von Blixen-Finecke, husband to Danish writer Karen Blixen; killed in a plane crash (b. 1886)
  - Edward Miner Gallaudet, 80, American educator, pioneer instructor for the deaf, first president of Gallaudet University (b. 1837)
  - Bartholomew James Stubbs, 45, Australian politician, member of the Western Australian Legislative Assembly from 1911 to 1917; killed in action at the Battle of Polygon Wood) (b. 1872)

== September 27, 1917 (Thursday) ==
- Battle of Polygon Wood – British forces dug down after forcing the German line back and repulsing enemy counterattacks. German casualties from September 21 to the end of the month were estimated at 13,500. The British had 15,375 casualties with 1,215 killed. Australian casualties were 5,471 dead and wounded.
- The Nueva Gerona hurricane weakened to Category 3 while turning northeast towards Florida. Warnings were issued for the U.S. Gulf States with heavy rains and flooding causing major crop and property. The storm was blamed for one fatality in Louisiana.
- German submarine SM UC-6 struck a mine and sank in the North Sea with the loss of all 16 crew.
- The Royal Flying Corps established air squadron No. 114.
- The Australian government established the Repatriation Department which operated until 1974.
- Born:
  - Louis Auchincloss, American novelist, known for works including The House of Five Talents, Portrait in Brownstone, and East Side Story; in Lawrence, Nassau County, New York, United States (d. 2010)
  - Carl Ballantine, American magician, considered the first magician to incorporate comedy into his magic acts; as Meyer Kessler, in Chicago, United States (d. 2009)
  - Naina Devi, Indian singer and music producer, popular vocalist in Hindustani classical music, music producer for All India Radio and Doordarshan, recipient of the Padma Shri; as Nilina Sen, in Calcutta, British India (present-day Kolkata, India) (d. 1993)
- Died: Edgar Degas, 83, French painter, credited as one of the founders of Impressionism although worked in realism as well with works such as The Bellelli Family (b. 1834)

== September 28, 1917 (Friday) ==
- Second Battle of Ramadi – The British 15th Indian Division and 6th Indian Cavalry Brigade were mobilized to capture Ramadi in Mesopotamia (now Iraq) from the Ottoman Empire when British intelligence learned railway construction was delaying Germany from sending reinforcements to bolster existing Ottoman units in the region.
- Twenty-seven German bombers – 25 Gothas and two newly commissioned Zeppelin-Staaken bombers – attempted a raid on England, but most turned back due to bad weather. The few that did reach their targets dropped bombs that injured three people and inflicted £129 in damage. Three Gothas were lost, and six others were damaged while landing.
- The first 46 American air cadets arrived at Foggia, Italy, for training, followed by another 250. In all, almost 500 American aviators received training in Italy before the war ended in November 1918.
- The Royal Navy established the Plans Division as the strategic arm of the Admiralty for both world wars.
- The Portuguese Naval Aviation was established as the air military army of the Portuguese Navy.
- Italian actor and film-maker Vittorio De Sica made his screen debut in the Italian adventure film The Clemenceau Affair, adapted from the novel by Alexandre Dumas.
- Born: Wee Chong Jin, Malaysian-Singaporean judge, first Chief Justice of Singapore; in Penang, British Malaya (present-day Malaysia) (d. 2005)
- Died:
  - T. E. Hulme, 34, English poet and critic, known for his developing concepts on modernism; killed in action (b. 1883)
  - Patrick Bugden, 20, Australian soldier, recipient of the Victoria Cross for leading rescue missions for wounded soldiers during the Battle of Polygon Wood; killed in action (b. 1897)

== September 29, 1917 (Saturday) ==
- Operation Albion – Germany launched an amphibious attack on the Russian-controlled West Estonian archipelago in the Baltic Sea to strategically set up a launching point for an attack on Petrograd.
- Second Battle of Ramadi – British Indian forces captured Ramadi in what is now Iraq with 995 casualties, most of them being light wounds from shrapnel bursts. Ottoman forces in the town suffered 120 dead, 190 wounded and 3,456 taken prisoner. The capture was so swift and immediate that several local Arab tribes switched alliances from the Ottoman Empire to the British Commonwealth.
- Henry Lefroy retained his position as Premier of Western Australia after his Nationalist-Country-National Labor coalition defeated the Australian Labor Party led by Opposition Leader Philip Collier in the Western Australian state election.
- Seven Gothas and two Zeppelin-Staaken bombers raided England, killing 40 people and injuring 87. By this time, the population of London was so alarmed by the German night raids that up to 300,000 people sought shelter in London Underground stations at night, while others left the city to seek overnight accommodation elsewhere or else slept in open fields in the countryside.
- The Nueva Gerona hurricane made landfall near Fort Walton Beach, Florida, with winds clocked at 115 mph (185 km/h). The storm was blamed for the deaths of five people in Crestview, Florida.
- Duan Qirui, Premier of the Republic of China, secretly negotiated a series of loans with the Japanese government to help China meet its military commitments for the Allies during World War I.
- German submarine SM UC-55 was shelled, depth charged and sunk off Shetland by Royal Navy destroyers HMS Sylvia and HMS Tirade with the loss of 10 of her 27 crew.
- McLeod's Light Railways opened a rail line between Ahmedpur and Katwa in West Bengal, India.
- The Merchant Shipbuilding Corporation launched its first ship, a freighter named Sudbury, from its yard in Bristol, Pennsylvania and delivered the following year, but operational problems in strikes throughout the year delayed most of its other ship orders, leading the company to fold in 1923.

== September 30, 1917 (Sunday) ==
- Two German divisions counterattacked British positions along Menin Road Ridge in West Flanders, Belgium.
- Eleven Gotha bombers raided England.
- During a bombing raid on Constantinople, bombing commander John Alcock was forced to ditch the Handley aircraft after an oil-pipe in the engine was damaged. The plane was lost and the entire bombing crew was captured.
- The Nueva Gerona hurricane weakened to an extratropical cyclone over Georgia after merging with a frontal system, then dissipated six hours later. In all, the hurricane caused 35 fatalities and $2.17 million in damages.
- The film Camille, starring Theda Bara and Alan Roscoe and directed by J. Gordon Edwards, was released through Fox Film. It was an adaptation of the stage play La Dame aux Camélias (The Lady of the Camellias) by Alexandre Dumas.
- Born:
  - Kim Beazley Sr., Australian politician, cabinet minister for the Gough Whitlam administration and Member of Parliament for Fremantle from 1945 to 1977; in Northam, Western Australia, Australia (d. 2007)
  - Chacrinha, Brazilian comedian, best known for collaborations with television network Rede Globo; as José Abelardo Barbosa de Medeiros, in Surubim, Brazil (d. 1988)
  - Yuri Lyubimov, Russian actor and theater director, founder of the Taganka Theatre; in Yaroslavl, Russian Republic (present-day Russia) (d. 2014)
  - Buddy Rich, American jazz musician, considered one of the greatest jazz drummers ever with his collaborations with Tommy Dorsey, Harry James, and Count Basie; as Bernard Rich, in New York City, United States (d. 1987)
- Died: Patricio Montojo y Pasarón, 78, Spanish naval officer, commander of the Spanish fleet during the Battle of Manila Bay (b. 1839)
