= Karl Odebrett =

German World War I flying ace (1890–1930)

- Born: 31 July 1890; Schneidemühl, Kingdom of Prussia (present day Poland)
- Died: 13 February 1930 (aged 39); Caracas, Venezuela
- Military career
- Allegiance: Germany
- Branch: Aviation
- Rank: Leutnant
- Units: Flieger-Abteilung 47 (Flier Detachment 47); Flieger-Abteilung (Artillerie 215 Flier Detachment (Artillery) 215; Royal Bavarian Jagdstaffel 16 (Fighter Squadron 16); Royal Prussian Jagdstaffel 42 (Fighter Squadron 42)
- Commands: Royal Prussian Jagdstaffel 42
- Awards: Prussia: Royal House Order of Hohenzollern; Prussia: Iron Cross; Bavaria: Order of Military Merit Fourth Class with Swords; Austro-Hungary: Medal for Bravery

Leutnant Karl Odebrett was a German World War I flying ace credited with 16 aerial victories.

== Biography ==
See also Aerial victory standards of World War I

Karl Odebrett was born in Schneidemuhl on 31 July 1890.

He was a prewar pilot, earning civilian pilot's license no. 659 on 9 February 1914. As the war burgeoned, he volunteered for military service in aviation on 4 August 1914. He underwent military pilot training at Fliegerersatz-Abteilung 5 (Replacement Detachment 5). After that, he was posted to Flieger-Abteilung 47 (Flier Detachment 47) in Russia in 1915. On 18 October 1915, he shot down a Russian airplane for his first aerial victory.

He was wounded on 24 May 1916. On 25 July, he was switched to Flieger-Abteilung Artillerie 215 (Flier Detachment (Artillery) 215)), another German unit stationed in Russia. Here he was assigned a Fokker fighter, but had no success. On 11 November 1916, he was transferred to the Western Front and posted to Jagdstaffel 16 (Fighter Squadron 16). He would not score another victory until 19 June; that win sparked a string of five more, including three on 20 August. However, just three days after his seventh triumph on 4 September, he was wounded in the thigh by antiaircraft shrapnel fragments. He healed at Fliegerersatz-Abteilung 2 (Replacement Detachment 2) until 6 December 1917. Then he was appointed to command Jagdstaffel 42, which he did until war's end. He would shoot down nine more enemy airplanes in 1918, six of them fighters. With his sixteenth confirmed victory on 29 September, he had claims pending for five more victories. As 20 victories was the criterion for award of Germany's highest decoration for victory, an application for Odebrett's award was submitted in October, about a month before the Armistice. However, he never received the award.

Karl Odebrett died of liver failure in Caracas, Venezuela on 13 February 1930.

== Awards ==
- Prussia: Royal House Order of Hohenzollern: 28 April 1918
- Prussian: Iron Cross, First and Second Class
- Bavaria: Order of Military Merit Fourth Class with Swords
- Austro-Hungary: Bronze Bravery Medal
