= Jagdstaffel 42 =

Jasta 42
- Active: 1917–1918
- Country: German Empire
- Branch: Luftstreitkräfte
- Type: Fighter squadron
- Engagements: World War I

Royal Prussian Jagdstaffel 42, commonly abbreviated to Jasta 42, was a "hunting group" (i.e., fighter squadron) of the Luftstreitkräfte, the air arm of the Imperial German Army during World War I. The unit would score over 30 aerial victories during the war. The squadron's victories came at the expense of four killed in action, one wounded in action, and one taken prisoner of war.

== History ==
Jasta 42 was founded in September 1917 at Flieger-Abteilung (Flier Detachment) 3, Gotha, Germany. The squadron became operational on 18 December 1917. On 17 April 1918, it was consolidated into Jagdgruppe 12, which was commanded by Heinrich Kroll.

== Commanding officer (Staffelführer) ==
- Karl Odebrett (on leave during July 1918)

== Duty stations ==
- Gotha, Germany: September 1917
- Mars-la-Tour, France: 20 December 1917
- Froidmont: 26 March 1918
- Ercheu, France: 17 April 1918
- Grécourt, France: late May 1918
- Clastres, France: 15 August 1918
- Parpeville, France
- Le Brule
- Bois Saint Denis
- Thuilles

== Operations ==
Beginning 20 December 1917, Jasta 42 flew aerial support for Armee-Abteilung B. On 26 March 1918, they moved to support 7 Armee. In late May 1918, they were reassigned to support of 18 Armee; they remained in this role until war's end.
