= 1917 Nueva Gerona hurricane =

Category 4 Atlantic hurricane in 1917

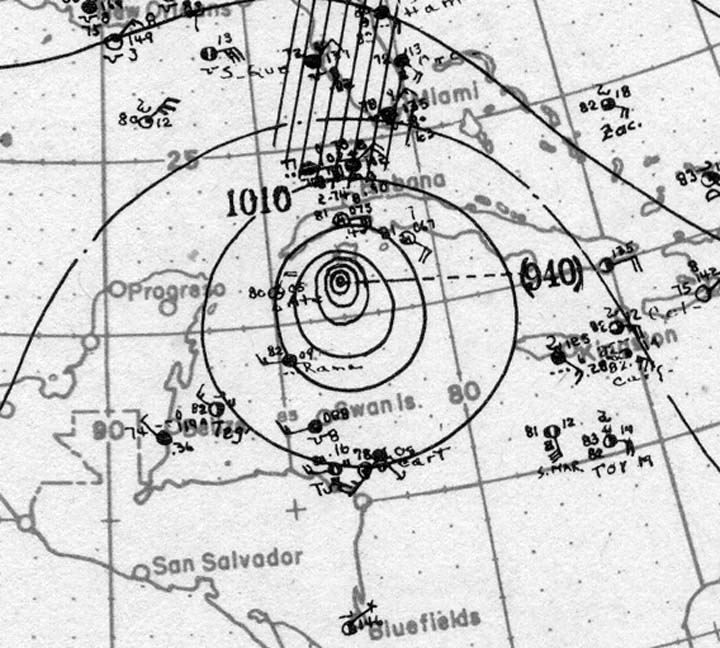
- Surface weather analysis of the hurricane over western Cuba on September 25

Meteorological history
- Formed: September 20, 1917
- Dissipated: September 30, 1917

Category 4 major hurricane
- 1-minute sustained (SSHWS/NWS)
- Highest winds: 150 mph (240 km/h)
- Lowest pressure: 928 mbar (hPa); 27.40 inHg

Overall effects
- Fatalities: ≥44 total
- Damage: $2.17 million (1917 USD)
- Areas affected: Antilles (particularly Jamaica and Cuba), Southeastern United States (especially Florida)
- IBTrACS
- Part of the 1917 Atlantic hurricane season

The 1917 Nueva Gerona hurricane was the most intense tropical cyclone to strike the Florida Panhandle until Hurricane Opal in 1995. The eighth tropical cyclone and fourth tropical storm of the season, this system was identified as a tropical storm east of the Lesser Antilles on September 20. After crossing the Lesser Antilles, the system entered the Caribbean Sea and achieved hurricane intensity on September 21. After becoming a Category 2 hurricane, the storm struck the northern coast of Jamaica on September 23. Early on September 25, the cyclone reached Category 4 status and attained maximum sustained winds of 150 mph (240 km/h) soon thereafter. Later that day, the hurricane made landfall in eastern Pinar del Río Province, Cuba. The system entered the Gulf of Mexico shortly thereafter and weakened slightly. Recurving to the northeast, the hurricane briefly threatened Louisiana before turning toward Florida. Early on September 29, the hurricane made landfall near Fort Walton Beach, Florida, with winds of 115 mph (185 km/h). Once over land, the cyclone rapidly weakened and transitioned into an extratropical cyclone before dissipating on September 30.

Some islands in the Lesser Antilles experienced strong winds and heavy rainfall, including Dominica, Guadeloupe, and Saint Lucia. In Jamaica, the hurricane caused significant damage to banana and coconut plantations. Communications from Holland Bay were disrupted when the station was demolished. The greatest damages were reported from the northern half of the island. Nine deaths occurred in the city of Port Antonio. In Nueva Gerona, Cuba, strong winds destroyed well-constructed buildings and all but 10 homes. The Isla de la Juventud overall experienced about $2 million (1917 USD) in damage and there were at least 20 fatalities. Orchards and crops were destroyed on the Pinar del Río Province. In Louisiana and Mississippi, impact was generally limited to damaged crops and timber stands. Ten deaths from drowning were reported in Louisiana. Farther east in Mobile, Alabama, portions of roofs, trees, and other debris littered streets. Communications were severed in Pensacola, Florida. Several small watercraft washed ashore, and numerous wharves, docks, and boat storages suffered impact. Total damages were estimated near $170,000 in Pensacola area. Five deaths were reported in Florida, all of them in Crestview. The storm and its remnants also produced rainfall in Georgia, North Carolina, and South Carolina.

== Meteorological history ==
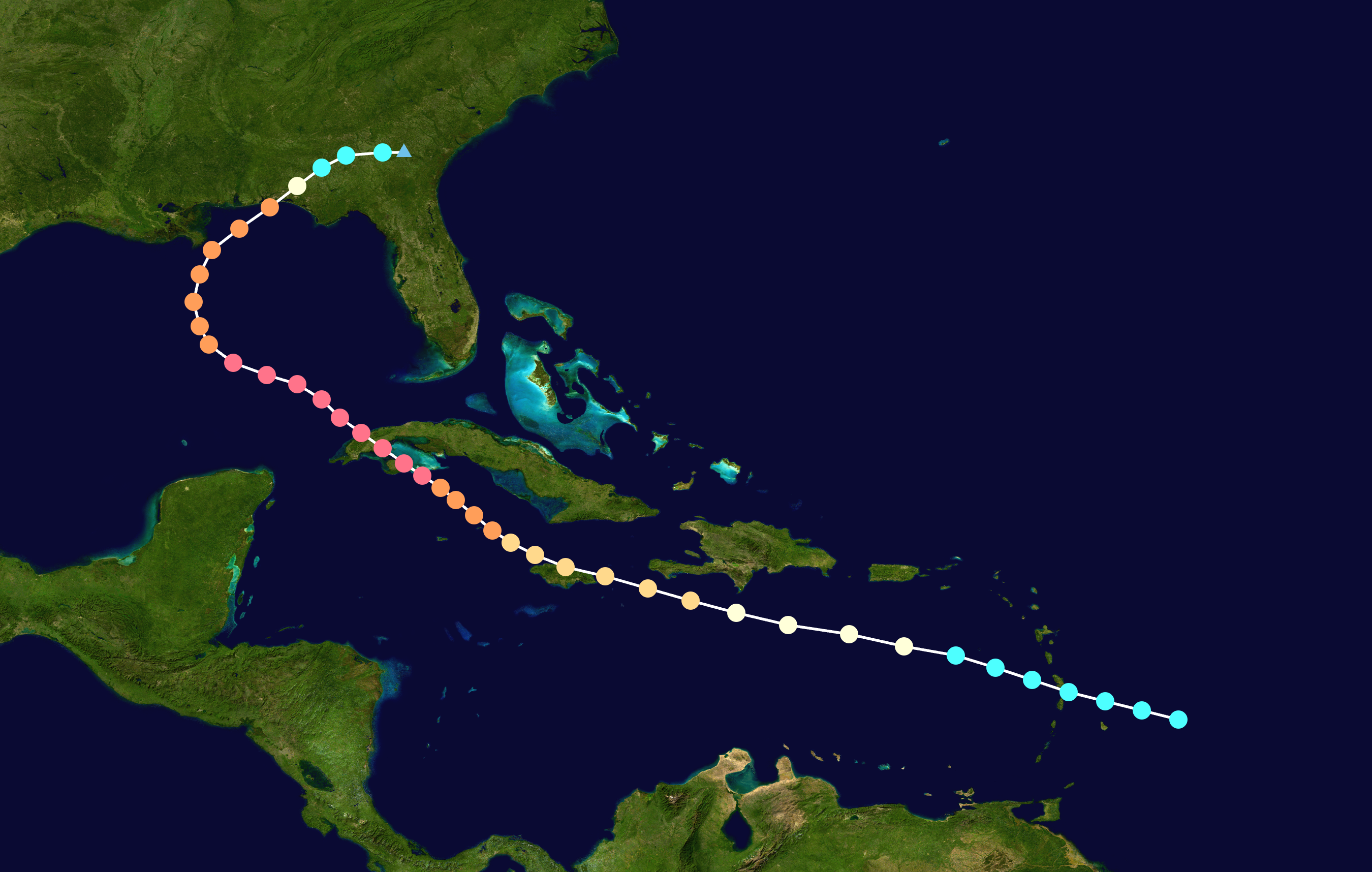
Map plotting the storm's track and intensity, according to the Saffir–Simpson scale Map key Saffir–Simpson scale Tropical depression (≤38 mph, ≤62 km/h) Tropical storm (39–73 mph, 63–118 km/h) Category 1 (74–95 mph, 119–153 km/h) Category 2 (96–110 mph, 154–177 km/h) Category 3 (111–129 mph, 178–208 km/h) Category 4 (130–156 mph, 209–251 km/h) Category 5 (≥157 mph, ≥252 km/h) Unknown Storm type Tropical cyclone Subtropical cyclone Extratropical cyclone, remnant low, tropical disturbance, or monsoon depression

An open trough of low pressure, possibly a tropical wave, developed into a tropical storm about 160 miles (260 km) east-northeast of Barbados at 00:00 UTC on September 20. Steadily intensifying, the storm moved west-northwestward and crossed the Lesser Antilles between the islands of Saint Lucia and Martinique several hours later. Upon entering the Caribbean Sea on September 21, the system intensified quicker, becoming a Category 1 hurricane on the modern-day Saffir–Simpson hurricane wind scale later that day. While passing south of the Tiburon Peninsula on the following day, the storm strengthened into a Category 2 hurricane. Later on September 23, the hurricane struck the northern coast of Jamaica, before re-emerging into the Caribbean Sea. Around 06:00 UTC on September 24, it intensified into a Category 3 hurricane while moving northwestward. Around that time, it struck Cayman Brac. Early on September 25, the storm achieved Category 4 status.

At 12:00 UTC on September 25, the hurricane attained its minimum barometric pressure of 928 mbar (27.4 inHg), an estimate made by Ramón Perez of the Instituto de Meteorología de la República de Cuba. Using a pressure-wind relationship, researchers at the National Hurricane Center estimated peak maximum sustained winds at 150 mph (240 km/h). Shortly after peak intensity, the cyclone brushed Isla de la Juventud. By 18:00 UTC on September 25, the hurricane made landfall at the same intensity in the eastern part of Pinar del Río Province in Cuba. The system entered the Gulf of Mexico later on September 25. The storm fell to Category 3 intensity early on September 27. It briefly tracked generally northward and approached southeastern Louisiana before re-curving northeastward late the next day. At 02:00 UTC on September 29, the hurricane made landfall near Fort Walton Beach, Florida, with winds of 115 mph (185 km/h). Once over land, the system rapidly weakened to a tropical storm within 12 hours. Early on September 30, it transitioned into an extratropical cyclone over Georgia after merging with a frontal system. About six hours later, the remnants of the hurricane dissipated.

The minimum atmospheric pressure of 928 mbar (27.4 inHg) established the cyclone as the third most intense landfalling Cuban hurricane. Deeper pressures of 921 and 915 mbar (27.2 and 27.0 inHg) were measured in the 1924 and 1932 hurricanes, respectively. The cyclone (949 mbar, 28.0 inHg) was also the most intense tropical cyclone in the Florida Panhandle until Hurricane Opal (942 mbar, 27.8 inHg). At the time, it was tied with an 1882 storm, which also had a central pressure of 949 mbar (28.0 inHg) at landfall in northwest Florida.

== Preparations and impact ==
=== Caribbean ===
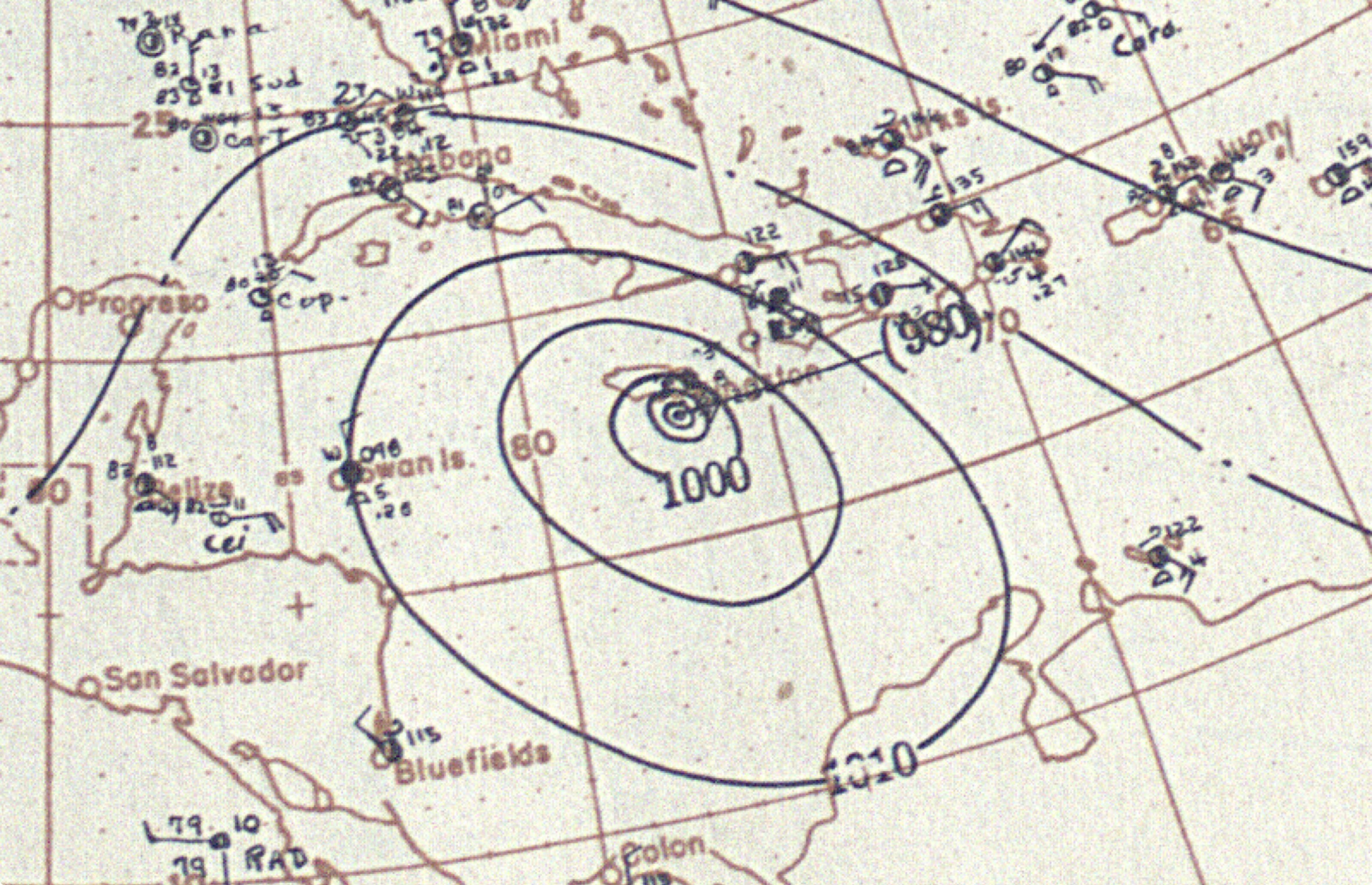
Weather map of the hurricane over Jamaica on September 23

On September 21, the United States Weather Bureau issued advisories because of strong swells in the Leeward Islands, indicating the presence of a tropical disturbance.

The system produced heavy precipitation and strong winds in the eastern Caribbean islands. In Jamaica, the hurricane caused significant damages to banana and coconut plantations. Communications from Holland Bay were disrupted when the station was demolished. The greatest damages were reported from the northern half of the island. At Port Antonio, the custom house was destroyed, while a hotel was severely damaged. Nine deaths occurred in the city. In Nueva Gerona, Cuba, severe winds destroyed well constructed buildings, devastating the town. Only ten homes remained standing. At a large plantation, every building but the house was destroyed. Nearly all of the chickens on the property were killed during the storm. Throughout Isla de la Juventud, damage reached approximately $2 million. The island's food supply was also ruined. Offshore, a number of ships capsized or went missing, resulting in "many" deaths. There were at least 20 fatalities on the island, while other accounts state that there were hundreds killed. Orchards and crops were destroyed on the Pinar del Río Province. A relief committed issued an appeal for aid to then-Cuban president Mario García Menocal and Americans. At the Burnside Hotel, among few buildings were demolished, a soup kitchen was opened to feed storm victims.

The destroyed buildings in Nueva Gerona

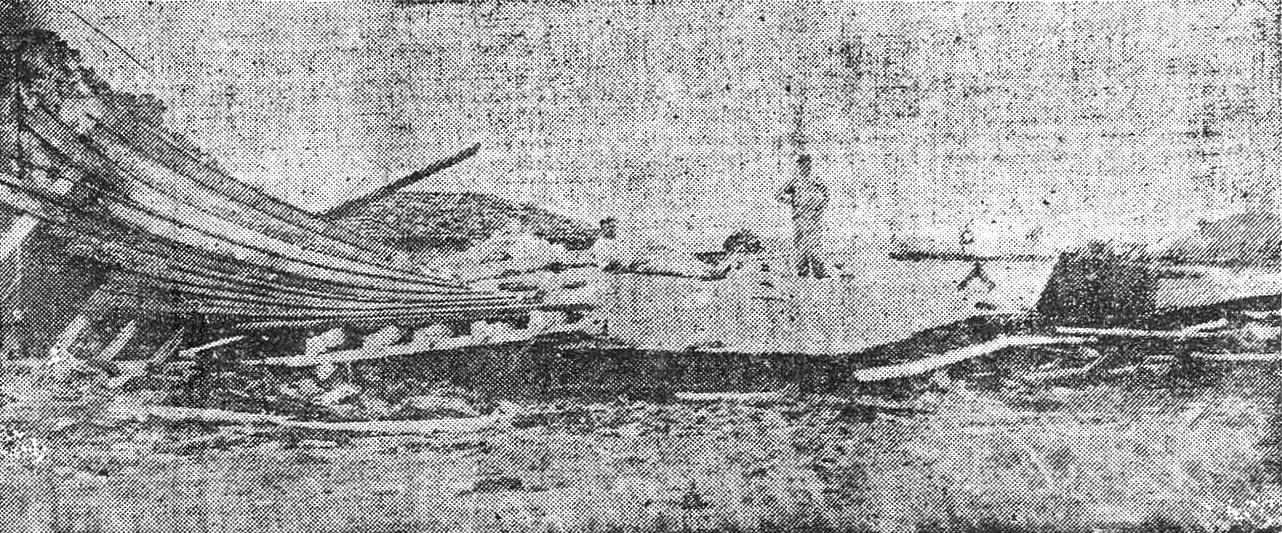
Customs office

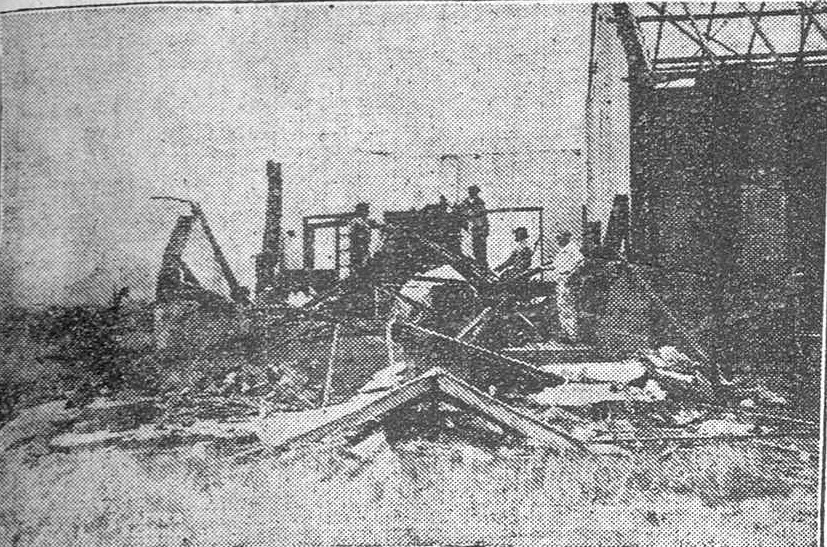
Power plant

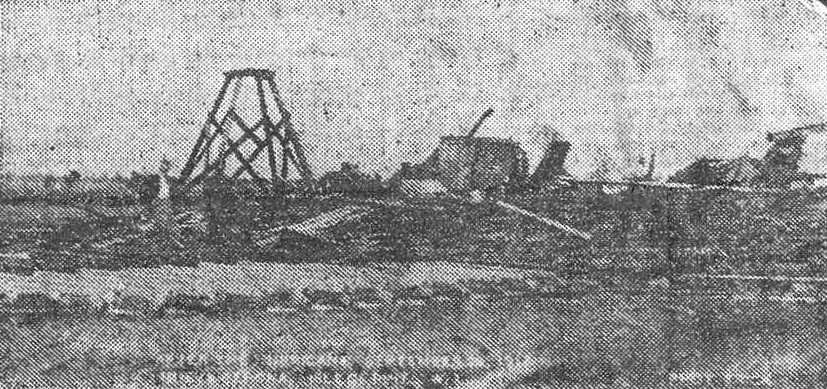
Radiotelegraph station

=== United States ===
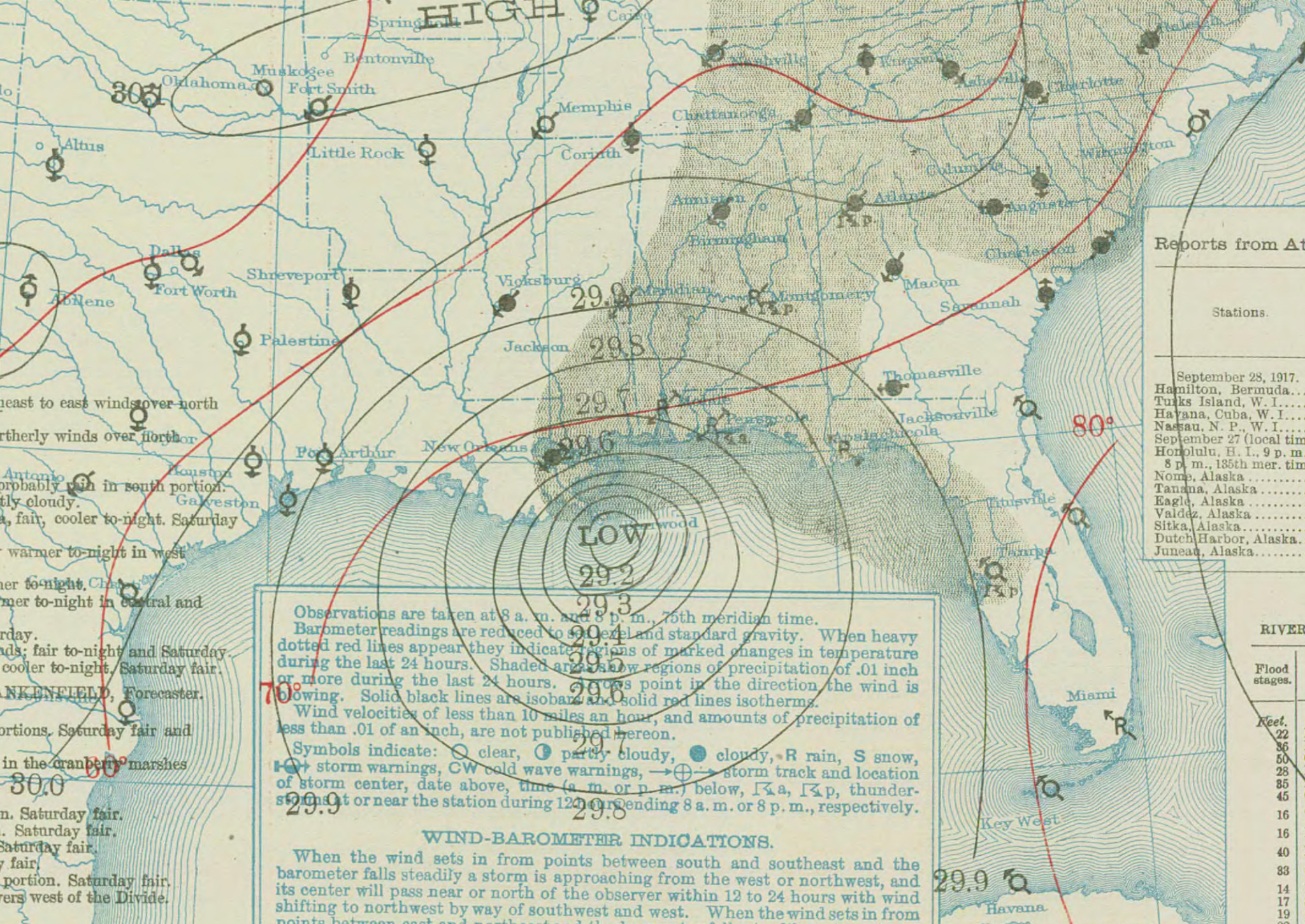
Surface weather analysis of the hurricane approaching landfall in the Florida Panhandle on September 28

On September 23, northeast storm warnings were issued for the Florida coast from West Palm Beach to Boca Grande. On September 25, the Weather Bureau advised marine traffic to remain alert in the Gulf of Mexico, noting that the intensity of the storm was unknown. Later, hurricane warnings were issued from Apalachicola, Florida, to Mobile, Alabama, on September 25. Warnings were also released from Pascagoula, Mississippi, to New Orleans, Louisiana, on September 26. The warnings were briefly discontinued because of track uncertainties, but they were re-issued when the cyclone began to curve northeast. On September 27 and September 28, scheduled vessel trips were cancelled in New Orleans, Louisiana. Marine traffic resumed after the storm passed east of the city. The storm struck the Gulf Coast later than anticipated because of slow forward motion.

In Louisiana, rain bands produced 6.40 in (163 mm) of rain in Burrwood. The Louisville and Nashville Railroad sent trains on alternate routes because of eroded tracks near Lake Catherine. The effects of the cyclone also damaged crops and timber stands in Louisiana and Mississippi. The storm surge associated with the hurricane moved several structures from their foundations in Buras, Louisiana. There, the storm was blamed for the death of an 8-year-old boy. Nine additional fatalities occurred near Houma after the fishing bark Wanna was wrecked. In Biloxi, warnings prevented considerable loss of shrimp boats. Street cars and other traffic were practically suspended in Gulfport.

In Alabama, more than 5 in (130 mm) of rain was measured in Montgomery, prompting flood advisories for the lower Alabama River watershed. At Camp Sheridan, a United States Army World War I training camp, the streets were inundated with at least a few inches of water. In Mobile, trees and telephone and telegraph wires were downed, cutting off communications. Roofs were detached and the galleries of houses were torn away. Police stopped the streets cars were operating and shut off the electricity. No boats from the area were lost, and waterfront damage was negligible.

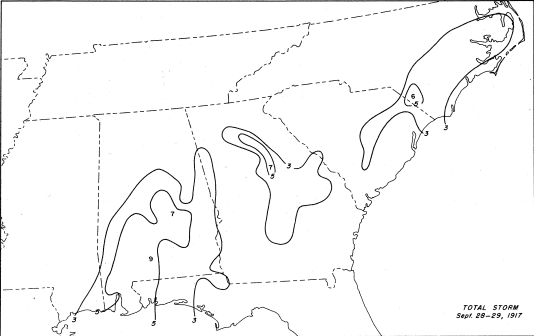
Rainfall totals from the hurricane (in inches) in the United States

The hurricane severed communication from Pensacola, Florida, though reports eventually indicated that the wireless radio plant was not destroyed. Several small watercraft washed ashore, including the USS Quincy, and numerous wharves, docks, and boat storages received damage. Total damages reached about $170,000 in the vicinity of Pensacola. Near the city, a portion of the Louisville and Nashville Railroad was 8 ft (2.4 m) underwater, while several of their bridges washed away. At Valparaiso, tides reached 7.5 ft (2.3 m) above normal. Significant destruction of timber occurred in Okaloosa and Santa Rosa counties, and crops, structures, and livestock were affected. Strong winds occurred along the southwest coast of Florida, and a wind gust of 44 mph (71 km/h) was reported in Jacksonville. A total of five people were killed in Crestview.

The storm and its remnants also produced rainfall in Georgia, North Carolina, and South Carolina.

== See also ==
- List of Florida hurricanes (1900–49)
- Hurricane Dennis
- Hurricane Ivan
