= History of nursing =

The word "nurse" originally came from the Latin word "nutricius", meaning to nourish,to protect and to sustain, referring to a wet-nurse; only in the late 16th century did it attain its modern meaning of a person who cares for the infirm.

From the earliest times most cultures produced a stream of nurses dedicated to service on religious principles. Both Christendom and the Muslim World generated a stream of dedicated nurses from their earliest days. In Europe before the foundation of modern nursing, Catholic nuns and the military often provided nursing-like services. It took until the 19th century for nursing to become a secular profession. In the 20th century nursing became a major profession in all modern countries, and was a favored career for women.

== Ancient history ==
The early history of nurses suffers from a lack of source material, but nursing in general has long been an extension of the wet-nurse function of women.

Buddhist Indian ruler (268 BC to 232 BC) Ashoka erected a series of pillars, which included an edict ordering hospitals to be built along the routes of travelers, and that they be "well provided with instruments and medicine, consisting of mineral and vegetable drugs, with roots and fruits"; "Whenever there is no provision of drugs, medical roots, and herbs, they are to be supplied, and skillful physicians appointed at the expense of the state to administer them." The system of public hospitals continued until the fall of Buddhism in India ca. AD 750.

About 100 BC the Charaka Samhita was written in India, stating that good medical practice requires a patient, physician, nurse, and medicines, with the nurse required to be knowledgeable, skilled at preparing formulations and dosage, sympathetic towards everyone, and clean.

The first known Christian nurse, Phoebe, is mentioned in Romans 16:1. During the early years of the Christian Church (ca. AD 50), St. Paul sent a deaconess named Phoebe to Rome as the first visiting nurse.

From its earliest days, following the edicts of Jesus, Christianity encouraged its devotees to tend the sick. Priests were often also physicians. According to the historian Geoffrey Blainey, while pagan religions seldom offered help to the infirm, the early Christians were willing to nurse the sick and take food to them, notably during the smallpox epidemic of AD 165-180 and the measles outbreak of around AD 250; "In nursing the sick and dying, regardless of religion, the Christians won friends and sympathisers".

Following the First Council of Nicaea in AD 325, Christianity became the official religion of the Roman Empire, leading to an expansion of the provision of care. Among the earliest were those built ca. 370 by St. Basil the Great, bishop of Caesarea Mazaca in Cappadocia in Asia Minor (modern-day Turkey), by Saint Fabiola in Rome ca. 390, and by the physician-priest Saint Sampson (d. 530) in Constantinople, Called the Basiliad, St. Basil's hospital resembled a city, and included housing for doctors and nurses and separate buildings for various classes of patients. There was a separate section for lepers. Eventually construction of a hospital in every cathedral town was begun.

Christian emphasis on practical charity gave rise to the development of systematic nursing and hospitals after the end of the persecution of the early church. Ancient church leaders like St. Benedict of Nursia (480-547) emphasized medicine as an aid to the provision of hospitality. 12th century Roman Catholic orders like the Dominicans and Carmelites have long lived in religious communities that work for the care of the sick.

Some hospitals maintained libraries and training programs, and doctors compiled their medical and pharmacological studies in manuscripts. Thus in-patient medical care in the sense of what we today consider a hospital, was an invention driven by Christian mercy and Byzantine innovation. Byzantine hospital staff included the Chief Physician (archiatroi), professional nurses (hypourgoi) and orderlies (hyperetai). By the twelfth century, Constantinople had two well-organized hospitals, staffed by doctors who were both male and female. Facilities included systematic treatment procedures and specialized wards for various diseases.

In the early 7th century, Rufaidah bint Sa’ad (also known as Rufaida Al-Aslamia) became what is now described as the first Muslim nurse. A contemporary of Muhammad, she hailed from the Bani Aslam tribe in Medina and learned her medical skills from her father, a traditional healer. After she had led a group of women to treat injured fighters on the battlefield, Muhammad gave her permission to set up a tent near the Medina mosque to provide treatment and care for the ill and the needy.

== Medieval Europe ==
Medieval hospitals in Europe followed a similar pattern to the Byzantine. They were religious communities, with care provided by monks and nuns. (An old French term for hospital is hôtel-Dieu, "hostel of God.") Some were attached to monasteries; others were independent and had their own endowments, usually of property, which provided income for their support. Some hospitals were multi-functional while others were founded for specific purposes such as leper hospitals, or as refuges for the poor, or for pilgrims: not all cared for the sick. The first Spanish hospital, founded by the Catholic Visigoth bishop Masona in AD 580 at Mérida, was a xenodochium designed as an inn for travellers (mostly pilgrims to the shrine of Eulalia of Mérida) as well as a hospital for citizens and local farmers. The hospital's endowment consisted of farms to feed its patients and guests. From the account given by Paul the Deacon we learn that this hospital was supplied with physicians and nurses, whose mission included the care the sick wherever they were found, "slave or free, Christian or Jew."

During the late 700s and early 800s, Emperor Charlemagne decreed that those hospitals which had been well conducted before his time and had fallen into decay should be restored in accordance with the needs of the time. He further ordered that a hospital should be attached to each cathedral and monastery.

During the 10th century the monasteries became a dominant factor in hospital work. The famous Benedictine Abbey of Cluny, founded in 910, set the example which was widely imitated throughout France and Germany. Besides its infirmary for the religious, each monastery had a hospital in which externs were cared for. These were in charge of the eleemosynarius, whose duties, carefully prescribed by the rule, included every sort of service that the visitor or patient could require.

As the eleemosynarius was obliged to seek out the sick and needy in the neighborhood, each monastery became a center for the relief of suffering. Among the monasteries notable in this respect were those of the Benedictines at Corbie in Picardy, Hirschau, Braunweiler, Deutz, Ilsenburg, Liesborn, Pram, and Fulda; those of the Cistercians at Arnsberg, Baumgarten, Eberbach, Himmenrode, Herrnalb, Volkenrode, and Walkenried.

No less efficient was the work done by the diocesan clergy in accordance with the disciplinary enactments of the councils of Aachen (817, 836), which prescribed that a hospital should be maintained in connection with each collegiate church. The canons were obliged to contribute towards the support of the hospital, and one of their number had charge of the inmates. As these hospitals were located in cities, more numerous demands were made upon them than upon those attached to the monasteries. In this movement the bishop naturally took the lead, hence the hospitals founded by Heribert (d. 1021) in Cologne, Godard (d. 1038) in Hildesheim, Conrad (d. 975) in Constance, and Ulrich (d. 973) in Augsburg. But similar provision was made by the other churches; thus at Trier the hospitals of St. Maximin, St. Matthew, St. Simeon, and St. James took their names from the churches to which they were attached. During the period 1207–1577 no less than 155 hospitals were founded in Germany.

The Ospedale Maggiore, traditionally named Ca' Granda (i.e. Big House), in Milan, northern Italy, was constructed to house one of the first community hospitals, the largest such undertaking of the fifteenth century. Commissioned by Francesco Sforza in 1456 and designed by Antonio Filarete it is among the first examples of Renaissance architecture in Lombardy.

The Normans brought their hospital system along when they conquered England in 1066. By merging with traditional land-tenure and customs, the new charitable houses became popular and were distinct from both English monasteries and French hospitals. They dispensed alms and some medicine, and were generously endowed by the nobility and gentry who counted on them for spiritual rewards after death.

According to Geoffrey Blainey, the Catholic Church in Europe provided many of the services of a welfare state: "It conducted hospitals for the old and orphanages for the young; hospices for the sick of all ages; places for the lepers; and hostels or inns where pilgrims could buy a cheap bed and meal". It supplied food to the population during famine and distributed food to the poor. This welfare system the church funded through collecting taxes on a large scale and possessing large farmlands and estates.

=== Roles for women ===
Catholic women played large roles in health and healing in medieval and early modern Europe. A life as a nun was a prestigious role; wealthy families provided dowries for their daughters, and these funded the convents, while the nuns provided free nursing care for the poor.

Meanwhile, in Catholic lands such as France, rich families continued to fund convents and monasteries, and enrolled their daughters as nuns who provided free health services to the poor. Nursing took the place of the more specialized physicians, surgeons, or apothecaries, particularly in rural areas where these professionals were rare. This made nursing a highly valued profession for women.

=== Middle East ===
The Eastern Orthodox Church had established many hospitals in the Middle East, but following the rise of Islam from the 7th century, Arabic medicine developed in this region, where a number of important advances were made and an Islamic tradition of nursing begun. Arab ideas were later influential in Europe. The famous Knights Hospitaller arose as a group of individuals associated with an Amalfitan hospital in Jerusalem, which was built to provide care for poor, sick or injured Christian pilgrims to the Holy Land. Following the capture of the city by Crusaders, the order became a military as well as infirmarian order.

Roman Catholic orders such as the Franciscans stressed tending the sick, especially during the devastating plagues.

== Early modern Europe ==
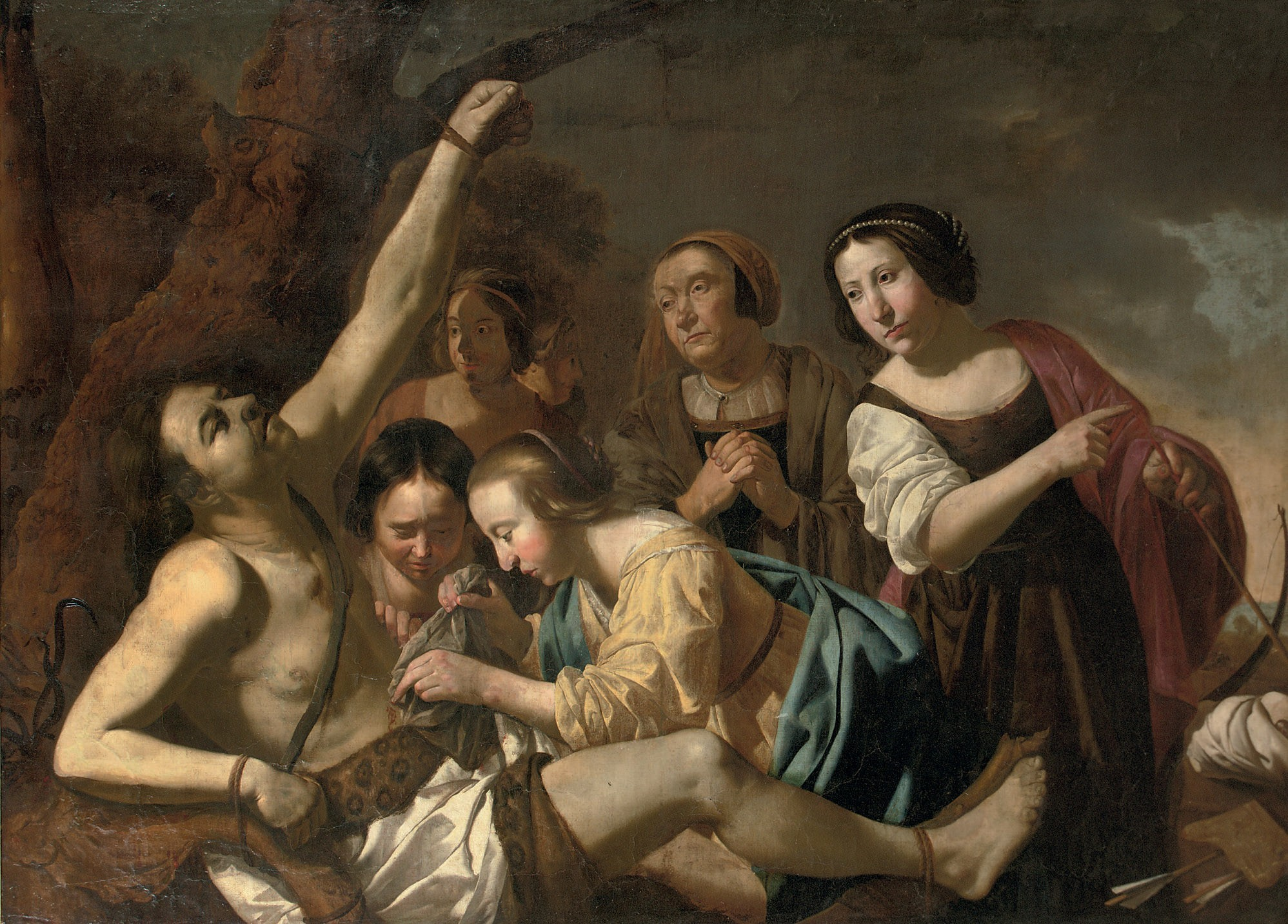
The subject of Saint Sebastian Tended by Saint Irene, here by Jan van Bijlert, c. 1620s, became popular in art in the early 17th century, connected with fears of plague and the encouragement of nursing

=== Catholic Europe ===
The Catholic Church provided hospital services because of its theology of salvation that holds that faith accompanied by good works were the route to heaven. The same theology holds strong into the 21st century. In Catholic areas, the tradition of nursing sisters continues uninterrupted today. Several orders of nuns provided nursing services in hospitals. A leadership role was taken by the Daughters of Charity of Saint Vincent de Paul, founded in France in 1633. New orders of Catholic nuns expanded the range of activities and reached new areas. For example, in rural Brittany in France, the Daughters of the Holy Spirit, created in 1706, played a central role. New opportunity for nuns as charitable practitioners were created by devout nobles on their own estates. The nuns provided comprehensive care for the sick poor on their patrons' estates, acting not only as nurses, but took on expanded roles as physicians, surgeons, and apothecaries. The French Catholics in New France (Canada) and New Orleans continued these traditions. During the French Revolution, most of the orders of nurses were shut down and there was no organized nursing care to replace them. However the demand for their nursing services remained strong, and after 1800 the sisters reappeared and resumed their work in hospitals and on rural estates. They were tolerated by officials because they had widespread support and were the link between elite physicians and distrustful peasants who needed help.

=== Protestantism closes the hospitals ===
The Protestant reformers, led by Martin Luther, rejected the notion that rich men could gain God's grace through good works—and thereby escape purgatory—by providing cash endowments to charitable institutions. They also rejected the Catholic idea that the poor patients earned grace and salvation through their suffering. Protestants generally closed all the convents and most of the hospitals, sending women home to become housewives, often against their will. On the other hand, local officials recognized the public value of hospitals, and some were continued in Protestant lands, but without monks or nuns and in the control of local governments.

In London, the crown allowed two hospitals to continue their charitable work, under nonreligious control of city officials. The convents were all shut down but Harkness finds that women—some of them former nuns—were part of a new system that delivered essential medical services to people outside their family. They were employed by parishes and hospitals, as well as by private families, and provided nursing care as well as some medical, pharmaceutical, and surgical services.

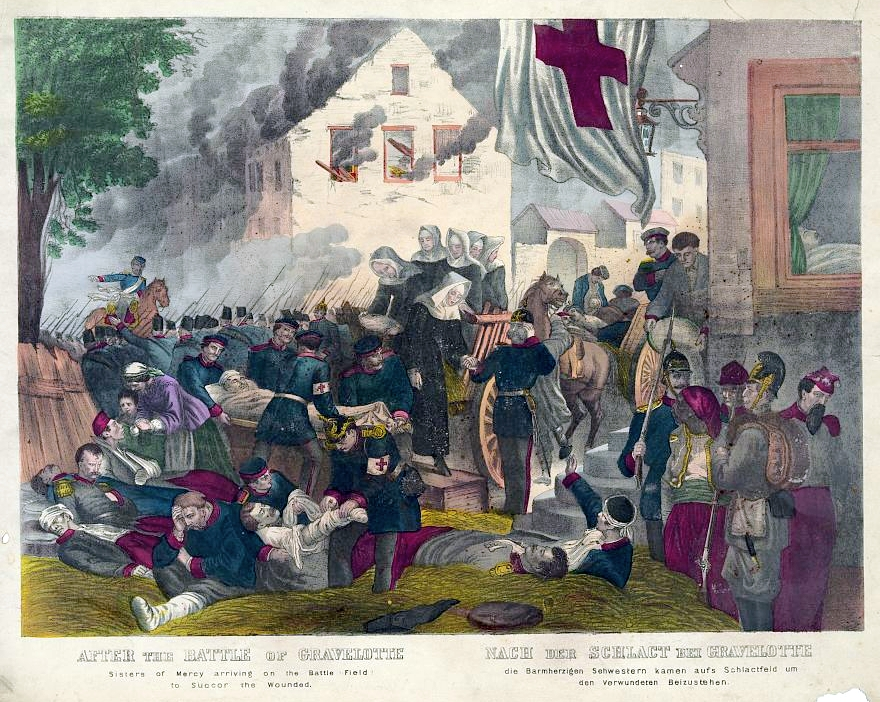
"After the Battle of Gravelotte. The French Sisters of Mercy of St. Borromeo arriving on the battle field to succor the wounded." Unsigned lithograph, 1870 or 1871.

In the 16th century, Protestant reformers shut down the monasteries and convents, though they allowed a few to continue in operation. Those nuns who had been serving as nurses were given pensions or told to get married and stay home. Between 1500 and 1800, Protestant Europe had a few notable hospitals, but no regular system of nursing. The weakened public role of women left female practitioners restricted to assisting neighbors and family in an unpaid and unrecognized capacity.

== Modern ==
Modern nursing began in the 19th century in Germany and Britain, and spread worldwide by 1900.

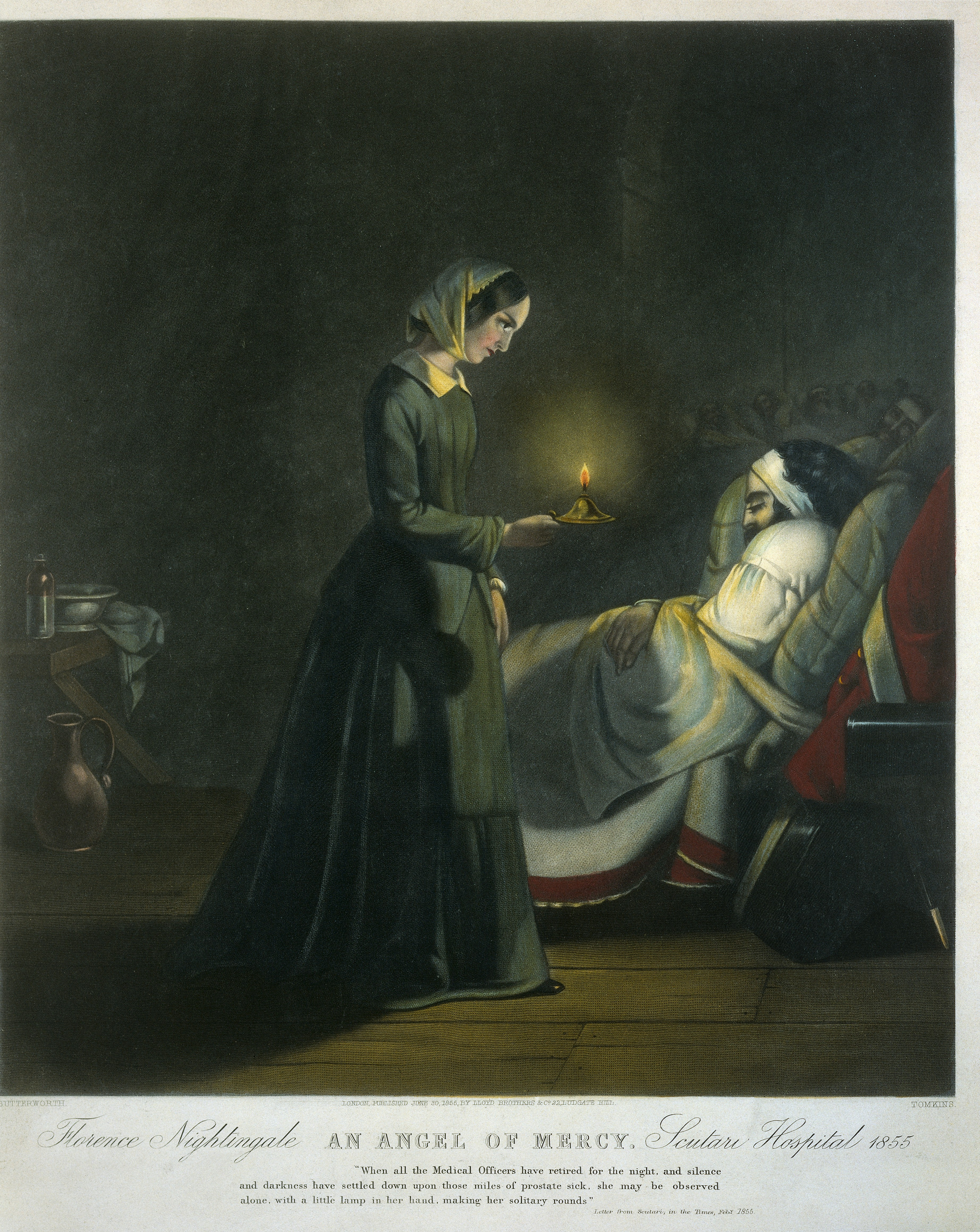
Florence Nightingale, an 'angel of mercy', set up her nursing school in 1860

=== Deaconess ===
Phoebe, the nurse mentioned in the New Testament, was a deaconess. The role had virtually died out centuries before, but was revived in Germany in 1836 when Theodor Fliedner and his wife Friederike Münster opened the first deaconess motherhouse in Kaiserswerth on the Rhine. The diaconate was soon brought to England and Scandinavia, Kaiserswerth model. The women obligated themselves for 5 years of service, receiving room, board, uniforms, pocket money, and lifelong care. The uniform was the usual dress of the married woman. There were variations, such as an emphasis on preparing women for marriage through training in nursing, child care, social work and housework. In the Anglican Church, the diaconate was an auxiliary to the pastorate, and there were no mother houses. By 1890 there were over 5,000 deaconesses in Protestant Europe, chiefly Germany, Scandinavia, and England. In World War II, diaconates in war zones sustained heavy damage. As eastern Europe fell to communism, most diaconates were shut down, and 7,000 deaconesses became refugees in West Germany. By 1957, in Germany there were 46,000 deaconesses and 10,000 associates. Other countries reported a total of 14,000 deaconesses, most of them Lutherans. In the United States and Canada 1,550 women were counted, half of them in the Methodist Church.

William Passavant in 1849 brought the first four deaconesses to Pittsburgh, after visiting Kaiserswerth. They worked at the Pittsburgh Infirmary (now Passavant Hospital). Between 1880 and 1915, 62 training schools were opened in the United States. The lack of training had weakened Passavant's programs. However recruiting became increasingly difficult after 1910 as women preferred graduate nursing schools or the social work curriculum offered by state universities.

=== Nightingale's Britain ===
The Crimean War was a significant development in nursing history when English nurse Florence Nightingale laid the foundations of professional nursing with the principles summarised in the book Notes on Nursing. Nightingale arrived in Crimea in 1855, where she became known as "The Lady with the Lamp." She would visit and minister to the wounded all-day and night. In Crimea, she managed and trained a group of nurses who tended to injured soldiers. When she arrived at Scutari, the British hospital base in Constantinople, she found appalling conditions and a lack of hygiene. The hospital was dirty and filled with excrement and rodents. Supplies, food, and even water were in short supply. Nightingale organized the cleaning of the entire hospital, ordered supplies, and implemented hygienic procedures such as hand washing to prevent the spread of infection. Some credit Nightingale with significantly reducing the death rate at the hospital, on account of her advocacy for proper supplies and sanitary procedures. A fund was set up in 1855 by members of the public to raise money for Florence Nightingale and her nurses' work In 1856, £44,039 (equivalent to roughly over £2 million today) was pooled and with this Nightingale decided to use the money to lay the foundations for a training school at St Thomas' Hospital. In 1860, the training for the first batch of nurses began; upon graduation from the school, these nurses used to be called 'Nightingales'. Nightingale's contemporary, Mary Seacole, was a Jamaican "doctress" who also nursed soldiers who were wounded during the Crimean War, and in the tradition of Jamaican doctresses, Seacole practised the hygiene that was later adopted by Nightingale in her writings after the Crimean War.

Nightingale's revelation of the abysmal nursing care afforded soldiers in the Crimean War energized reformers. Queen Victoria in 1860 ordered a hospital to be built to train Army nurses and surgeons, the Royal Victoria Hospital. The hospital opened in 1863 in Netley and admitted and cared for military patients. Beginning in 1866, nurses were formally appointed to Military General Hospitals. The Army Nursing Service (ANS) oversaw the work of the nurses starting in 1881. These military nurses were sent overseas beginning with the First Boer War (often called Zulu War) from 1879 to 1881. They were also dispatched to serve during the Egyptian Campaign in 1882 and the Sudan War of 1883 to 1884. During the Sudan War members of the Army Nursing Service nursed in hospital ships on the Nile as well as the Citadel in Cairo. Almost 2000 nurses served during the second Boer War, the Anglo-Boer War of 1899 to 1902, alongside nurses who were part of the colonial armies of Australia, Canada and New Zealand. They served in tented field hospitals. 23 Army Nursing sisters from Britain lost their lives from disease outbreaks.

=== New Zealand ===
New Zealand was the first country to regulate nurses nationally, with adoption of the Nurses Registration Act on 12 September 1901. It was here in New Zealand that Ellen Dougherty became the first registered nurse.

=== Canada ===
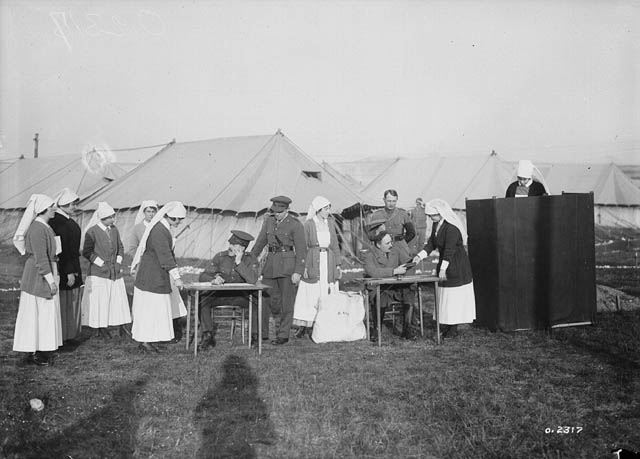
Nursing sisters at a Canadian military hospital in France voting in the Canadian federal election, 1917

Canadian nursing began in Catholic Quebec with the Augustine nuns in 1639. They opened a mission that cared for the spiritual and physical needs of patients. They created the first nursing apprenticeship training in North America.

In the nineteenth century, there were several Catholic orders of nursing spreading their services across Canada. These women had only an occasional consultation with a physician. Towards the end of the nineteenth-century hospital care and medical services had been improved and expanded. Much of this was due to the Nightingale model, which prevailed in English Canada. In 1874 the first formal nursing training program was started at the General and Marine Hospital in St. Catharines in Ontario. Many programs popped up in hospitals across Canada after this one was established. Graduates and teachers from these programs began to fight for licensing legislation, nursing journals, university training for nurses, and for professional organizations for nurses.

The first instance of Canadian nurses and the military was in 1885 with the North-West Rebellion. Some nurses came out to aid the wounded. In 1901 Canadian nurses were officially part of the Royal Canadian Army Medical Corps. Georgina Fane Pope and Margaret C. MacDonald were the first nurses officially recognized as military nurses.

Canadian missionary nurses were also of great importance in Henan, China as a part of the North China Mission starting in 1888.

In the late nineteenth and early twentieth centuries, women made inroads into various professions including teaching, journalism, social work, and public health. These advances included the establishment of a Women's Medical College in Toronto (and in Kingston, Ontario) in 1883, attributed in part to the persistence of Emily Stowe, the first female doctor to practice in Canada. Stowe's daughter, Augusta Stowe-Gullen, became the first woman to graduate from a Canadian medical school.

Apart from a token few, women were outsiders to the male-dominated medical profession. As physicians became better organized, they successfully had laws passed to control the practice of medicine and pharmacy and banning marginal and traditional practitioners. Midwifery—practiced along traditional lines by women—was restricted and practically died out by 1900. Even so, the great majority of childbirths took place at home until the 1920s, when hospitals became preferred, especially by women who were better educated, more modern, and more trusting in modern medicine.

==== Prairie provinces ====
In the Prairie provinces, the first homesteaders relied on themselves for medical services. Poverty and geographic isolation empowered women to learn and practice medical care with the herbs, roots, and berries that worked for their mothers. They prayed for divine intervention but also practiced supernatural magic that provided as much psychological as physical relief. The reliance on homeopathic remedies continued as trained nurses and doctors and how-to manuals slowly reached the homesteaders in the early 20th century.

After 1900 medicine and especially nursing modernized and became well organized.

The Lethbridge Nursing Mission in Alberta was a representative Canadian voluntary mission. It was founded, independent of the Victorian Order of Nurses, in 1909 by Jessie Turnbull Robinson. A former nurse, Robinson was elected as president of the Lethbridge Relief Society and began district nursing services aimed at poor women and children. The mission was governed by a volunteer board of women directors and began by raising money for its first year of service through charitable donations and payments from the Metropolitan Life Insurance Company. The mission also blended social work with nursing, becoming the dispenser of unemployment relief.

Richardson (1998) examines the social, political, economic, class, and professional factors that contributed to ideological and practical differences between leaders of the Alberta Association of Graduate Nurses (AAGN), established in 1916, and the United Farm Women of Alberta (UFWA), founded in 1915, regarding the promotion and acceptance of midwifery as a recognized subspecialty of registered nurses. Accusing the AAGN of ignoring the medical needs of rural Alberta women, the leaders of the UFWA worked to improve economic and living conditions of women farmers. Irene Parlby, the UFWA's first president, lobbied for the establishment of a provincial Department of Public Health, government-provided hospitals and doctors, and passage of a law to permit nurses to qualify as registered midwives. The AAGN leadership opposed midwife certification, arguing that nursing curricula left no room for midwife study, and thus nurses were not qualified to participate in home births. In 1919 the AAGN compromised with the UFWA, and they worked together for the passage of the Public Health Nurses Act that allowed nurses to serve as midwives in regions without doctors. Thus, Alberta's District Nursing Service, created in 1919 to coordinate the province's women's health resources, resulted chiefly from the organized, persistent political activism of UFWA members and only minimally from the actions of professional nursing groups clearly uninterested in rural Canadians' medical needs.

The Alberta District Nursing Service administered health care in the predominantly rural and impoverished areas of Alberta in the first half of the 20th century. Founded in 1919 to meet maternal and emergency medical needs by the United Farm Women (UFWA), the Nursing Service treated prairie settlers living in primitive areas lacking doctors and hospitals. Nurses provided prenatal care, worked as midwives, performed minor surgery, conducted medical inspections of schoolchildren, and sponsored immunization programs. The post-Second World War discovery of large oil and gas reserves resulted in economic prosperity and the expansion of local medical services. The passage of provincial health and universal hospital insurance in 1957 precipitated the eventual phasing out of the obsolete District Nursing Service in 1976.

==== Recent trends ====
After World War II, the health care system expanded and was nationalized with Medicare. Currently there are 260,000 nurses in Canada but they face the same difficulties as most countries, as technology advances and the aging population requires more nursing care.

=== Mexico ===
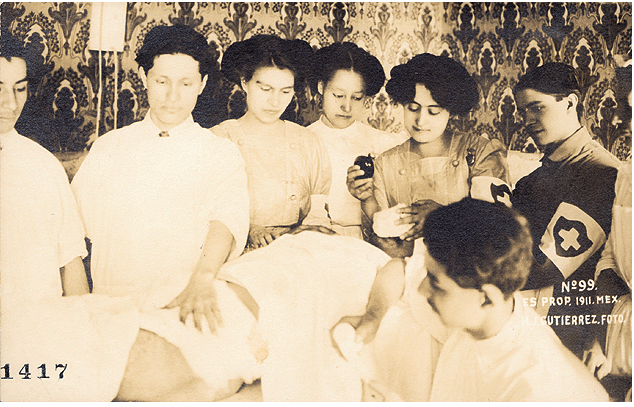
Elena Arizmendi Mejia and volunteers of the Mexican Neutral White Cross, 1911

During most of Mexico's wars in the nineteenth and early twentieth centuries, camp followers known as soldaderas nursed soldiers wounded in warfare. During the Mexican Revolution (1910-1920) care of soldiers in northern Mexico was also undertaken by the Neutral White Cross, founded by Elena Arizmendi Mejia after the Mexican Red Cross refused to treat revolutionary soldiers. The Neutral White Cross treated soldiers regardless of their faction.

=== France ===
Professionalization of nursing in France came in the late 19th and early 20th century. In 1870 France's 1,500 hospitals were operated by 11,000 Catholic sisters; by 1911 there were 15,000 nuns representing over 200 religious orders. Government policy after 1900 was to secularize public institutions, and diminish the role the Catholic Churches. The lay staff was enlarged from 14,000 in 1890 to 95,000 in 1911. This political goal came in conflict with the need to maintain better quality of medical care in antiquated facilities. Many doctors, while personally anti-clerical, realized their dependence on the Catholic sisters. Most lay nurses came from peasant or working-class families and were poorly trained. Faced with the long hours and low pay, many soon married and left the field, while the Catholic sisters had renounced marriage and saw nursing as their God-given vocation. New government-operated nursing schools turned out nonreligious nurses who were slated for supervisory roles. During the World War, an outpouring of patriotic volunteers brought large numbers of untrained middle-class women into the military hospitals. They left when the war ended but the long-term effect was to heighten the prestige of nursing. In 1922 the government issued a national diploma for nursing.

=== United States ===
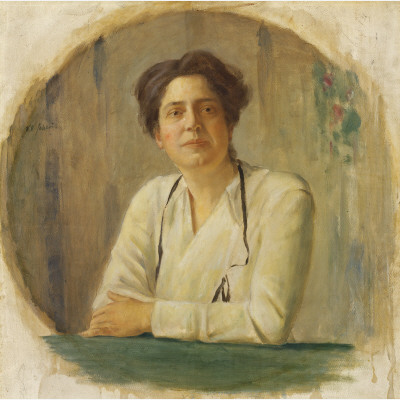
Portrait of Lillian Wald, pioneer of public health nursing, by William Valentine Schevill, National Portrait Gallery in Washington, D.C.

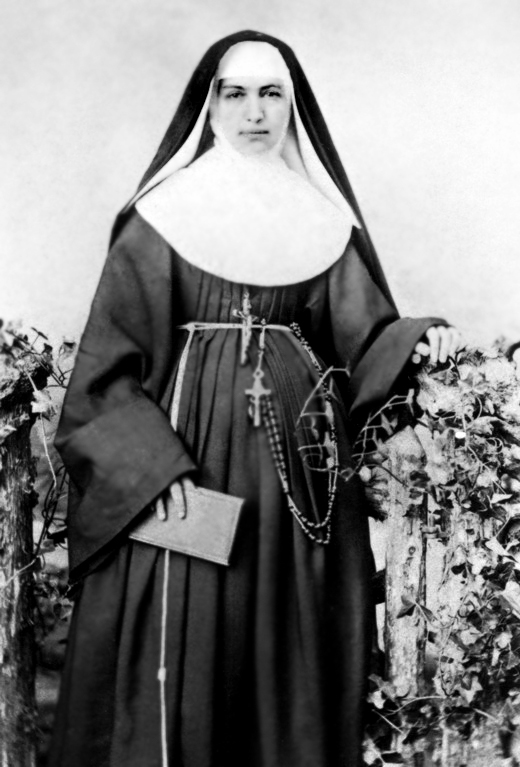
Saint Marianne Cope was among many Catholic nuns to influence the development of modern hospitals and nursing.

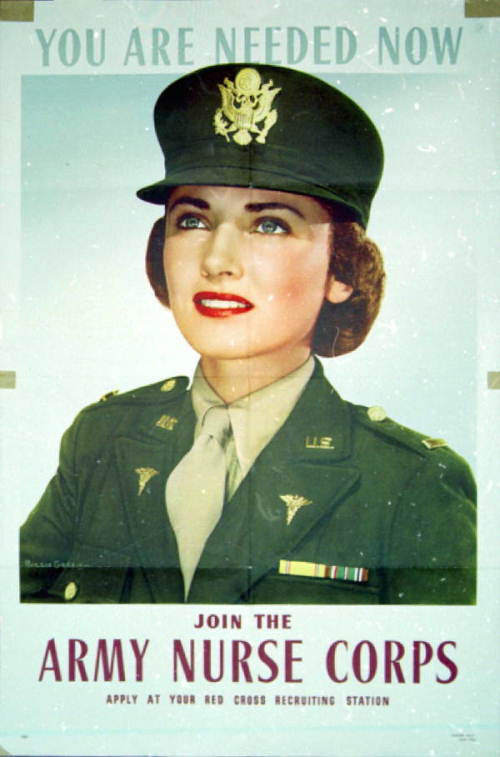
World War II Recruiting poster for the United States Army Nurse Corps (founded 1901)

Nursing professionalized rapidly in the late 19th century as larger hospitals set up nursing schools that attracted ambitious women from middle- and working-class backgrounds. Agnes Elizabeth Jones and Linda Richards established quality nursing schools in the U.S. and Japan; Linda Richards was officially America's first professionally trained nurse, having been trained at Florence Nightingale's training school, and subsequently graduating in 1873 from the New England Hospital for Women and Children in Boston

In the early 1900s, the autonomous, nursing-controlled, Nightingale-era schools came to an end. Despite the establishment of university-affiliated nursing schools, such as Columbia and Yale, hospital training programs were dominant. Formal "book learning" was discouraged in favor of clinical experience through an apprenticeship. In order to meet a growing demand, hospitals used student nurses as cheap labor at the expense of quality formal education.

=== Jamaica ===
Mary Seacole came from a long line of Jamaican nurses, or "doctresses", who worked at healing British soldiers and sailors at the Jamaican military base of Port Royal. These doctresses of the eighteenth century used good hygiene and herbal remedies to nurse their clients back to health. In the 18th century, these doctresses included Seacole's mother, who was a mixed-race woman who was most likely a child of a slave, and who acquired medical knowledge of herbal remedies from West African ancestors. Other 18th century doctresses included Sarah Adams and Grace Donne, the mistress and healer to Jamaica's wealthiest planter, Simon Taylor. Another eighteenth century doctress was Cubah Cornwallis, who nursed back to health famous sailors such as the young Horatio Nelson, 1st Viscount Nelson and Sailor Bill, who later became William IV of the United Kingdom.

==== Hospitals ====
The number of hospitals grew from 149 in 1873 to 4,400 in 1910 (with 420,000 beds) to 6,300 in 1933, primarily because the public trusted hospitals more and could afford more intensive and professional care.

They were operated by city, state and federal agencies, by churches, by stand-alone non-profits, and by for-profit enterprises run by a local doctor. All the major denominations built hospitals; in 1915, the Catholic Church ran 541, staffed primarily by unpaid nuns. The others sometimes had a small cadre of deaconesses as staff. Most larger hospitals operated a school of nursing, which provided training to young women, who in turn did much of the staffing on an unpaid basis. The number of active graduate nurses rose rapidly from 51,000 in 1910 to 375,000 in 1940 and 700,000 in 1970.

The Protestant churches reentered the health field, especially by setting up orders of women, called deaconesses who dedicated themselves to nursing services.

The modern deaconess movement began in Germany in 1836 when Theodor Fliedner and his wife opened the first deaconess motherhouse in Kaiserswerth on the Rhine. It became a model and within a half century were over 5,000 deaconesses in Europe. The Chursh of England named its first deaconess in 1862. The North London Deaconess Institution trained deaconesses for other dioceses and some served overseas.

William Passavant in 1849 brought the first four deaconesses to Pittsburgh, in the United States, after visiting Kaiserswerth. They worked at the Pittsburgh Infirmary (now Passavant Hospital).

The American Methodists – the largest Protestant denomination—engaged in large-scale missionary activity in Asia and elsewhere in the world, making medical services a priority as early as the 1850s. Methodists in America took note, and began opening their own charitable institutions such as orphanages and old people's homes after 1860. In the 1880s, Methodists began opening hospitals in the United States, which served people of all religious backgrounds beliefs. By 1895 13 hospitals were in operation in major cities.

In 1884, U.S. Lutherans, particularly John D. Lankenau, brought seven sisters from Germany to run the German Hospital in Philadelphia.

By 1963, the Lutheran Church in America had centers for deaconess work in Philadelphia, Baltimore, and Omaha.

==== Public health ====
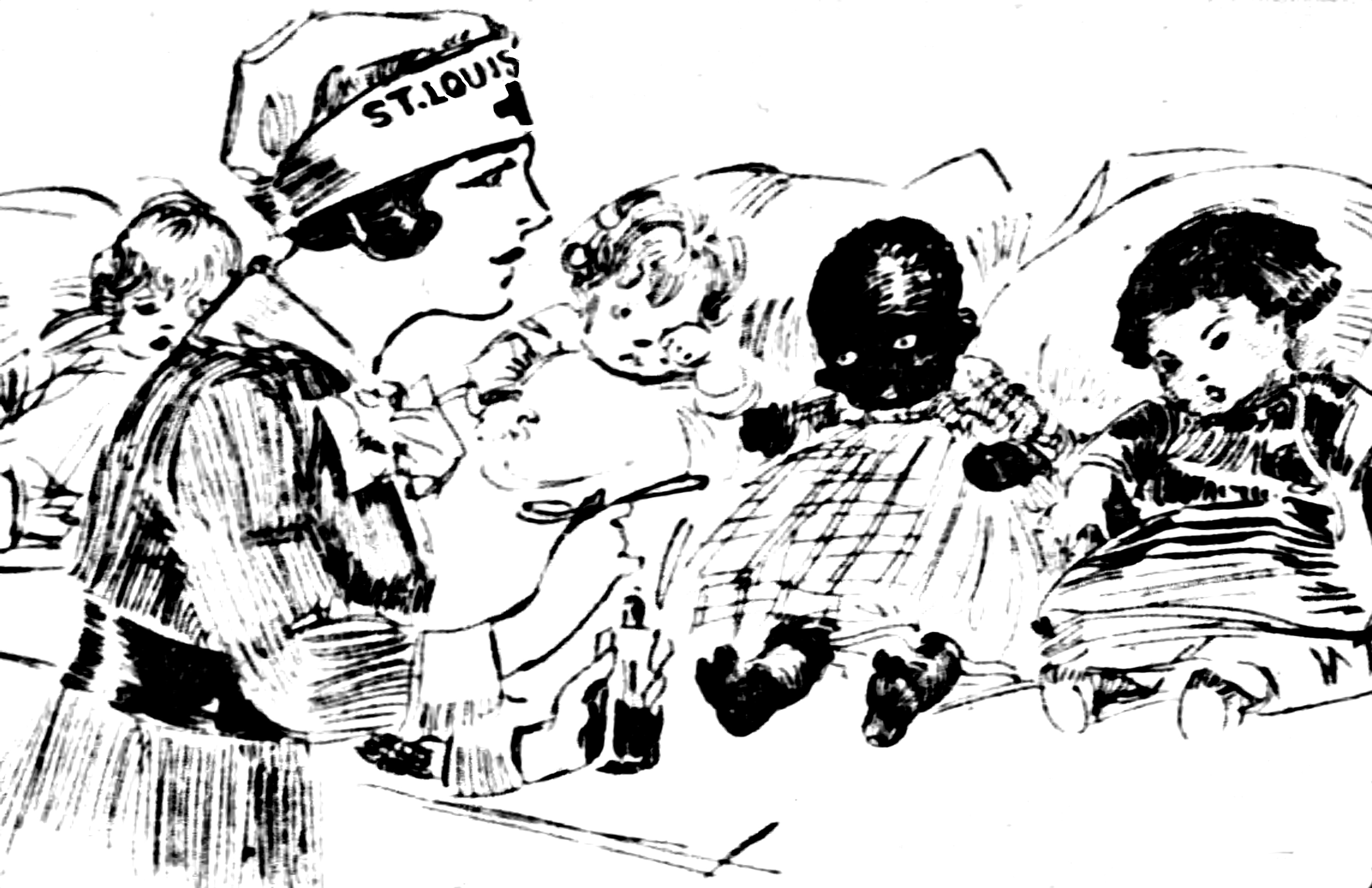
February 1918 drawing by Marguerite Martyn of a public-health nurse in St. Louis, Missouri, with medicine and babies

In the U.S., the role of public health nurse began in Los Angeles in 1898, by 1924 there were 12,000 public health nurses, half of them in the 100 largest cities. Their average annual salary in larger cities was $1,390. In addition, there were thousands of nurses employed by private agencies handling similar work. Public health nurses supervised health issues in the public and parochial schools, to prenatal and infant care, handled communicable diseases and tuberculosis and dealt with an aerial diseases.

During the Spanish–American War of 1898, medical conditions in the tropical war zone were dangerous, with yellow fever and malaria endemic. The United States government called for women to volunteer as nurses. Thousands did so, but few were professionally trained. Among the latter were 250 Catholic nurses, most of them from the Daughters of Charity of St. Vincent de Paul.

==== Nursing schools ====
Sporadic progress was made on several continents, where medical pioneers established formal nursing schools. But even as late as the 1870s, "women working in North American urban hospitals typically were untrained, working class, and accorded lowly status by both the medical profession they supported and society at large". Nursing had the same status in Great Britain and continental Europe before World War I.

Hospital nursing schools in the United States and Canada took the lead in applying Nightingale's model to their training programmers:

standards of classroom and on-the-job training had risen sharply in the 1880s and 1890s, and along with them the expectation of decorous and professional conduct

In late the 1920s, the women's specialties in health care included 294,000 trained nurses, 150,000 untrained nurses, 47,000 midwives, and 550,000 other hospital workers (most of them women).

In recent decades, professionalization has moved nursing degrees out of RN-oriented hospital schools and into community colleges and universities. Specialization has brought numerous journals to broaden the knowledge base of the profession.

=== World War I ===
==== Britain ====
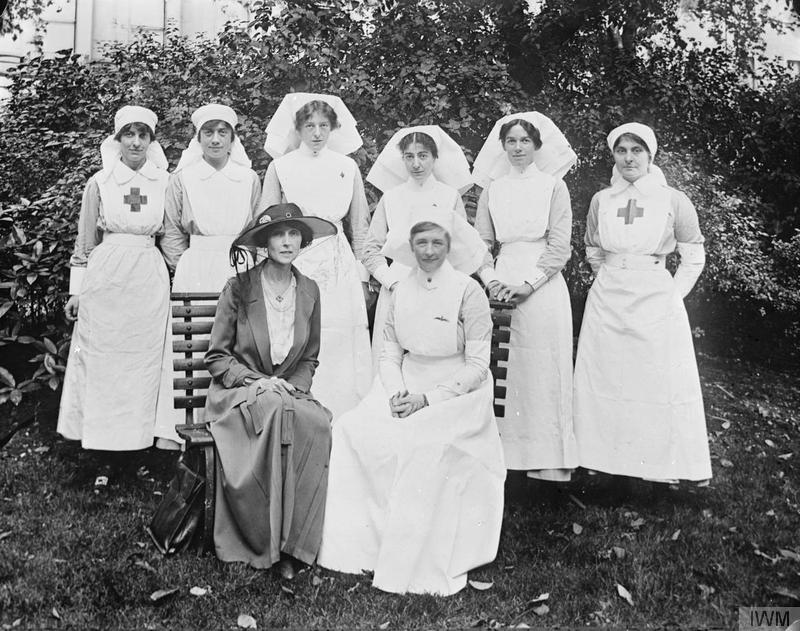
Voluntary Aid Detachment (VAD) members during the First World War

By the beginning of World War I, military nursing still had only a small role for women in Britain; 10,500 nurses enrolled in Queen Alexandra's Imperial Military Nursing Service (QAIMNS) and the Princess Mary's Royal Air Force Nursing Service. These services dated to 1902 and 1918, and enjoyed royal sponsorship. There also were Voluntary Aid Detachment (VAD) nurses who had been enrolled by the Red Cross. The ranks that were created for the new nursing services were Matron-in-Chief, Principal Matron, Sister and Staff Nurses. Women joined steadily throughout the War. At the end of 1914, there were 2,223 regular and reserve members of the QAIMNS and when the war ended there were 10,404 trained nurses in the QAIMNS.

Grace McDougall (1887–1963) was the energetic commandant of the First Aid Nursing Yeomanry (FANY), which had formed in 1907 as an auxiliary to the home guard in Britain. McDougall at one point was captured by the Germans but escaped. The British army wanted nothing to do with them so they drove ambulances and ran hospitals and casualty clearing stations for the Belgian and French armies.

==== Canada ====
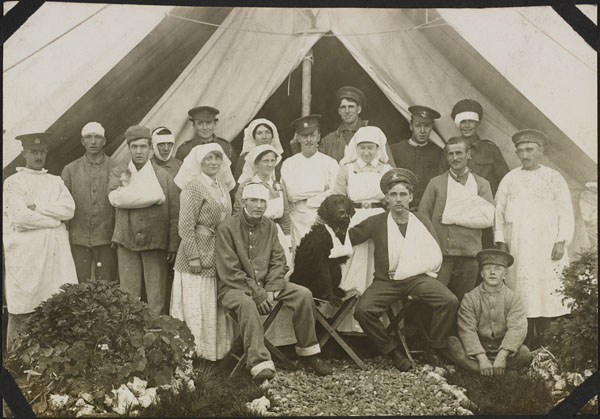
Nursing sisters of the No. 2 Canadian General Hospital in Le Tréport, France, 1917, nicknamed "Bluebirds" for their uniforms

When Canadian nurses volunteered to serve during World War I, they were made commissioned officers by the Canadian Army before being sent overseas, a move that would grant them some authority in the ranks, so that enlisted patients and orderlies would have to comply with their direction. Canada was the first country in the world to grant women this privilege. At the beginning of the War, nurses were not dispatched to the casualty clearing stations near the front lines, where they would be exposed to shell fire. They were initially assigned to hospitals a safe distance away from the front lines. As the war continued, however, nurses were assigned to casualty clearing stations. They were exposed to shelling, and caring for soldiers with "shell shock" and casualties suffering the effects of new weapons such as poisonous gas, as Katherine Wilson-Sammie recollects in Lights Out! A Canadian Nursing Sister’s Tale. World War I was also the first war in which a clearly marked hospital ship evacuating the wounded was targeted and sunk by an enemy submarine or torpedo boat, an act that had previously been considered unthinkable, but which happened repeatedly (see List of hospital ships sunk in World War I). Nurses were among the casualties.

Canadian women volunteering to serve overseas as nurses overwhelmed the army with applications. A total of 3,141 Canadian "nursing sisters" served in the Canadian Army Medical Corps and 2,504 of those served overseas in England, France and the Eastern Mediterranean at Gallipoli, Alexandria and Salonika. By the end of the First World War, 46 Canadian Nursing Sisters had died In addition to these nurses serving overseas with the military, others volunteered and paid their own way over with organizations such as the Canadian Red Cross, the Victorian Order of Nurses, and St. John Ambulance. The sacrifices made by these nurses during the War in fact gave a boost to the women's suffrage movement in many of the countries that fought in the war. The Canadian Army nursing sisters were among the first women in the world to win the right to vote in a federal election; the Military Voters Act of 1917 extended the vote to women in the service such as Nursing Sisters.

==== Australia ====
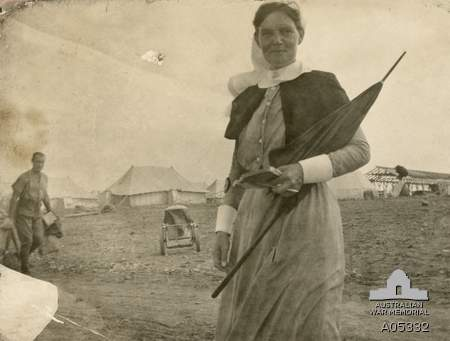
Sister Grace Wilson of the 3rd Australian General Hospital on Lemnos. She sailed from Sydney, New South Wales on board RMS Mooltan on 15 May 1915.

Australian nurses served in the war as part of the Australian General Hospital. Australia established two hospitals at Lemnos and Heliopolis Islands to support the Dardanelles campaign at Gallipoli. Nursing recruitment was sporadic, with some reserve nurses sent with the advance parties to set up the transport ship HMAS Gascoyne while others simply fronted to Barracks and were accepted, while still others were expected to pay for their passage in steerage. Australian nurses from this period became known as "grey ghosts" because of their drab uniforms with starched collar and cuffs.

During the course of the war, Australian nurses were granted their own administration rather than working under medical officers. Australian Nurses hold the record for the maximum number of triage cases processed by a casualty station in a twenty-four-hour period during the battle of Passchendale. Their work routinely included administering ether during haemostatic surgery and managing and training medical assistants (orderlies).

Some 560 Australian army nurses served in India during the war, where they had to overcome a debilitating climate, outbreaks of disease, insufficient numbers, overwork and hostile British Army officers.

==== United States ====
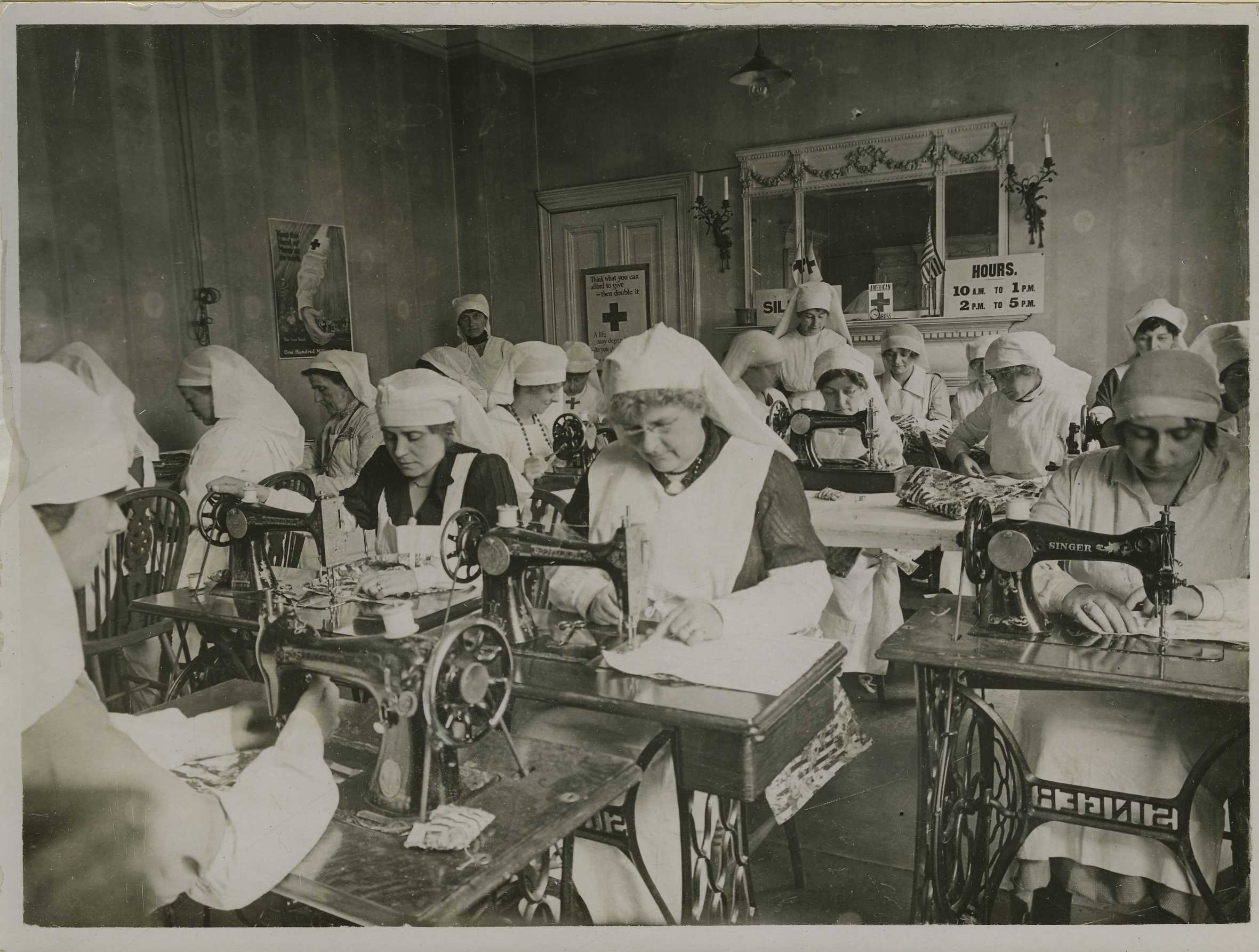
American Red Cross workers sewing surgical dressings in London, c. 1914–1918

Preceding the United States' entrance into World War I, American nurses under the American Red Cross were working in Europe as early as 1915. The United States Army Nurse Corps, formed in 1901, was quite small before World War I, with only 403 active nurses, but volunteers greatly increased when the United States entered the war in 1917. Over 10,000 of the eventual 21,480 volunteer nurses in the Army Nurse Corps served in Europe. American Nurses wore uniforms for the first time in World War I, increasing their credibility and legitimizing their role in the war.

American nurses in the Army Nurse Corps and American Red Cross staffed base hospitals across the United States and Europe, treating wounded soldiers and disease victims, especially victims of the Spanish flu. American nurses worked near the battlefield as essential members of surgical teams in casualty clearing stations. Three members of the Army Nurse Corps were injured as a result of enemy fire and many died from disease.

=== Interwar ===
Surveys in the U.S. showed that nurses often got married a few years after graduation and quit work; other waited 5 to 10 years for marriage; careerists some never married. By the 1920s increasing numbers of married nurses continued to work. The high turnover meant that advancement could be rapid; the average age of a nursing supervisor in a hospital was only 26 years. Wages for private duty nurses were high in the 1920s—$1,300 a year when working full-time in patients' homes or at their private rooms in hospitals. This was more than double what a woman could earn as a teacher or in office work. Rates fell sharply when the Great Depression came in 1929, and continuous work was much harder to find.

=== World War II ===
==== Canada ====
Over 4000 women served as nurses in uniform in the Canadian Armed Forces during the Second World War. They were called "Nursing Sisters" and had already been professionally trained in civilian life. However, in military service they achieved an elite status well above what they had experienced as civilians. The Nursing Sisters had much more responsibility and autonomy, and had more opportunity to use their expertise, then civilian nurses. They were often close to the front lines, and the military doctors – all men – delegated significant responsibility to the nurses because of the high level of casualties, the shortages of physicians, and extreme working conditions.

==== Australia ====
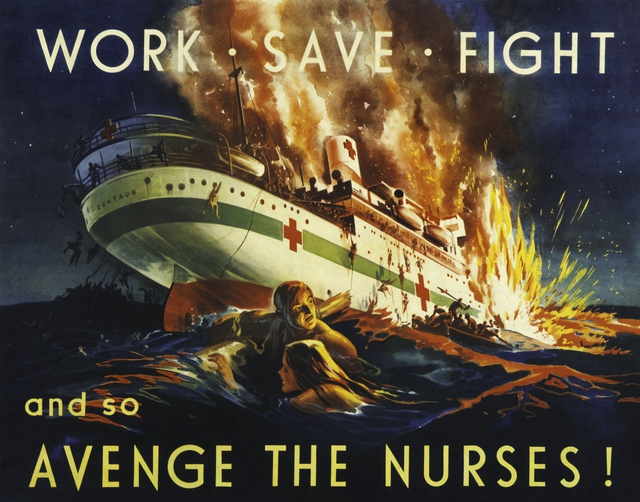
Centaur poster

In 1942, sixty five front line nurses from the General Hospital Division in British Singapore were ordered aboard the Vyner Brook and Empire Star for evacuation, rather than caring for wounded. The ships were strafed with machine gun fire by Japanese planes. Sisters Vera Torney and Margaret Anderson were awarded medals when they could find nothing else on the crowded deck and covered their patients with their own bodies. A version of this action was honoured in the film Paradise Road. The Vyner Brook was bombed and sank quickly in shallow water of the Sumatra Strait and all but twenty-one were lost at sea, presumed drowned. The remaining nurses swam ashore at Mentok, Sumatra. The twenty-one nurses and some British and Australian troops were marched into the sea and killed with machine gun fire in the Banka Island massacre. Sister Vivian Bullwinkel was the only survivor. She became Australia's premier nursing war hero when she nursed wounded British soldiers in the jungle for three weeks, despite her own flesh wound. She survived on the charity provided by Indonesian locals, but eventually hunger and the privations of hiding in mangrove swamp forced her to surrender. She remained imprisoned for the remainder of the war.

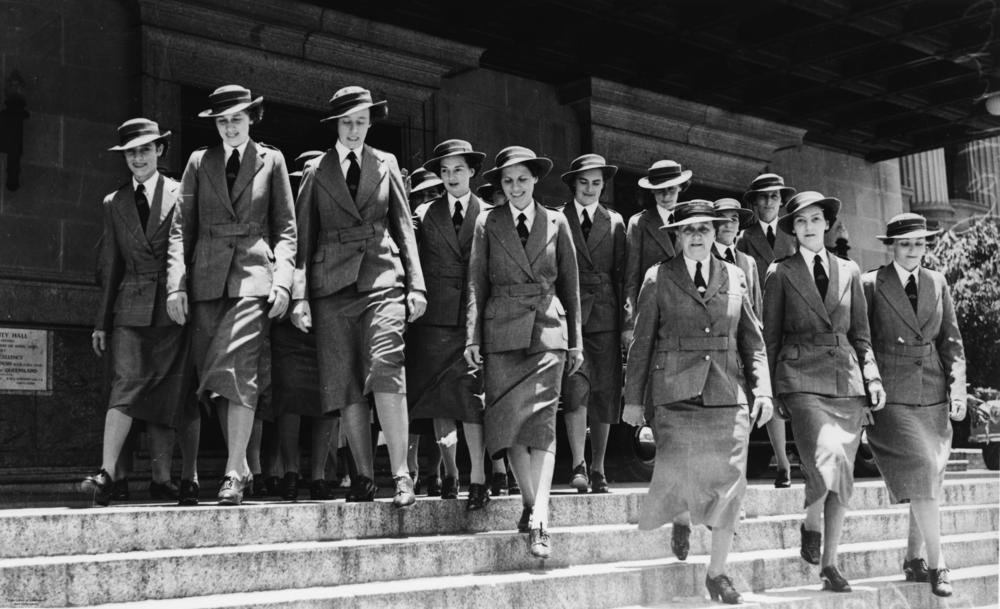
Australian sisters

At around the same time, another group of twelve nurses stationed at the Rabaul mission in New Guinea were captured along with missionaries by invading Japanese troops and interred at their camp for two years. They cared for a number of British, Australian and American wounded. Toward the end of the war, they were transferred to a concentration camp in Kyoto and imprisoned under freezing conditions and forced into hard labour.

==== United States ====
As Campbell (1984) shows, the nursing profession was transformed by World War Two. Army and Navy nursing was highly attractive and a larger proportion of nurses volunteered for service higher than any other occupation in American society.

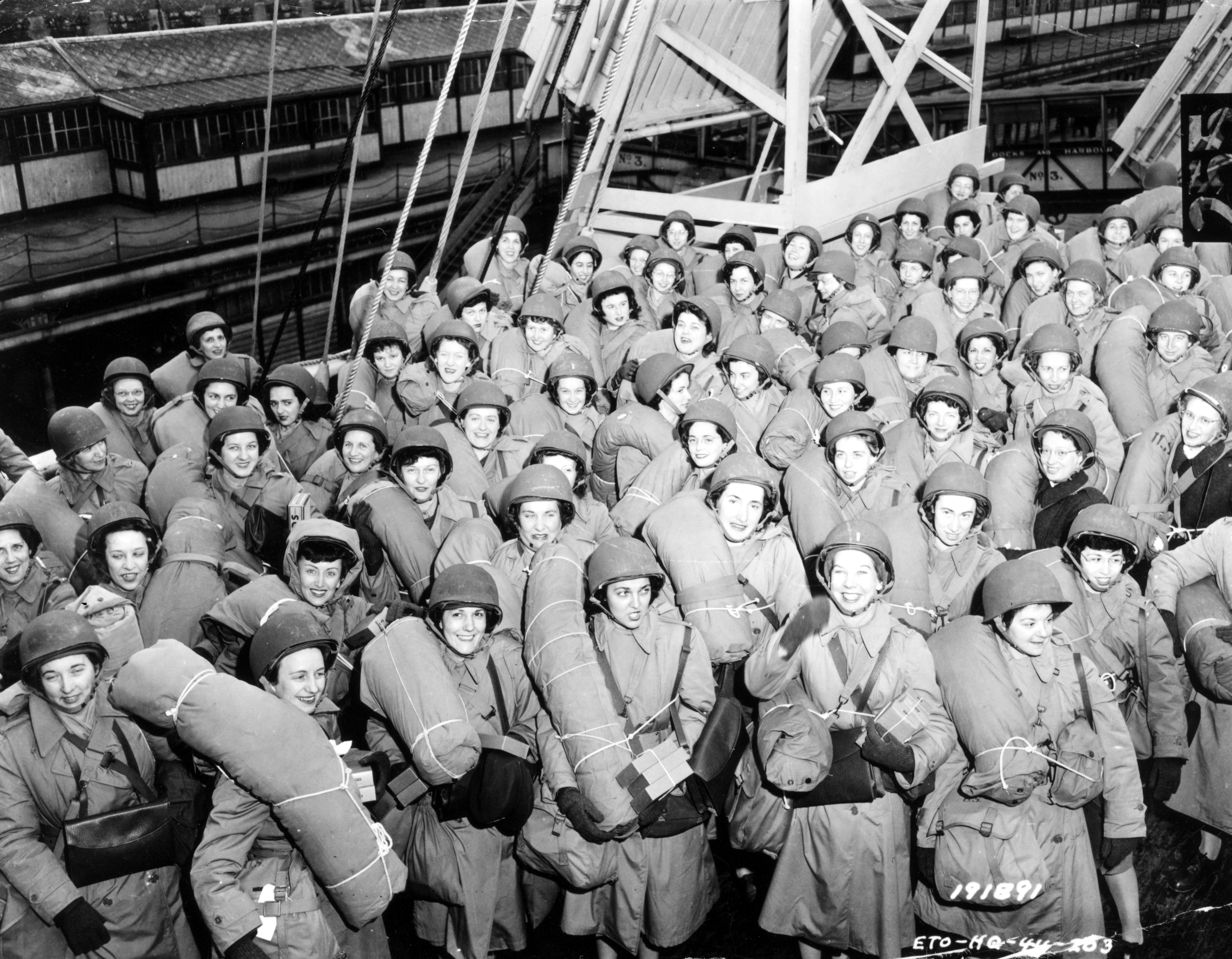
U.S. Army nurses preparing to disembark in Liverpool, England, 11 January 1944

The public image of the nurses was highly favorable during the war, as the simplified by such Hollywood films as "Cry 'Havoc'" which made the selfless nurses heroes under enemy fire. Some nurses were captured by the Japanese, but in practice they were kept out of harm's way, with the great majority stationed on the home front. However, 77 were stationed in the jungles of the Pacific, where their uniform consisted of "khaki slacks, mud, shirts, mud, field shoes, mud, and fatigues." The medical services were large operations, with over 600,000 soldiers, and ten enlisted men for every nurse. Nearly all the doctors were men, with women doctors allowed only to examine the WAC.

President Franklin D. Roosevelt hailed the service of nurses in the war effort in his final "Fireside Chat" of 6 January 1945. Expecting heavy casualties in the invasion of Japan, he called for a compulsory draft of nurses. The casualties never happened and there was never a draft of American nurses.

==== Britain ====
During World War II, nurses belonged to Queen Alexandra's Imperial Military Nursing Service (QAIMNS), as they had during World War I, and as they remain today. (Nurses belonging to the QAIMNS are informally called "QA"s.) Members of the Army Nursing Service served in every overseas British military campaign during World War II, as well as at military hospitals in Britain. At the beginning of World War II, nurses held officer status with equivalent rank, but were not commissioned officers. In 1941, emergency commissions and a rank structure were created, conforming with the structure used in the rest of the British Army. Nurses were given rank badges and were now able to be promoted to ranks from Lieutenant through to Brigadier. Nurses were exposed to all dangers during the War, and some were captured and became prisoners of war.

==== Germany ====
Germany had a very large and well organized nursing service, with three main organizations, one for Catholics, one for Protestants, and the DRK (Red Cross). In 1934 the Nazis set up their own nursing unit, the Brown Nurses, absorbing one of the smaller groups, bringing it up to 40,000 members. It set up kindergartens, hoping to seize control of the minds of the younger Germans, in competition with the other nursing organizations. Civilian psychiatric nurses who were Nazi party members participated in the killings of invalids, although the process was shrouded in euphemisms and denials.

Military nursing was primarily handled by the DRK, which came under partial Nazi control. Front line medical services were provided by male medics and doctors. Red Cross nurses served widely within the military medical services, staffing the hospitals that perforce were close to the front lines and at risk of bombing attacks. Two dozen were awarded the highly prestigious Iron Cross for heroism under fire. They are among the 470,000 German women who served with the military.

== See also ==
- History of nursing in the United Kingdom
  - Voluntary Aid Detachment in World War I and II
- History of nursing in the United States
  - Nursing in the United States
  - List of African-American women in medicine
  - History of Philippine nurses in the United States
- Nursing in Australia
- Nursing in Germany
- Nursing in Canada#History
- Nursing in Hong Kong
- Nursing in India
- Nursing in Japan
- Nursing in Islam
- Nursing in Kenya
- Nursing in Pakistan
- Nursing in the Philippines
  - History of Philippine nurses in the United States
- Nursing in Taiwan
- List of nurses
- Timeline of nursing history
