= Nursing in Islam =

In Islam, nurses provide healthcare services to patients, families and communities as a manifestation of love for Allah and Muhammad. The nursing profession is not new to Islam. Islamic traditions include sympathy for and responsibility toward those in need. This perspective had emerged during the development of Islam as a religion, culture, and civilization.

== Ethos of health care service ==
In Islamic traditions, caring is the manifestation of love for Allah and Muhammad. Caring in Islam, however, is more than the act of empathy; instead, it consists of being responsible for, sensitive to, and concerned with those in need, namely the weak, the suffering and the outcasts of society. This act of caring is further divided into three principles: intention, thought, and action. Intention and thought refer to who, what, where, when and why to care, whereas action is related to the knowledge necessary to be able to care. In short, health care is deemed a service to the patients and to Allah, as opposed to other professions that are commercial. This ethos was the fundamental motivating factor for the majority of the doctors and nurses in the history of Islam.

== Approach to health care service ==
Another aspect of Islamic health care service that distinguishes it from the contemporary Western health care industry is the holistic approach to health and wellbeing taken. This holistic approach consists of both treating the organic basis of the ailments and providing spiritual support for the patient. This spiritual component comes in the form of Tawheed (Oneness of Allah), a dimension lacking in current Western models of nursing and, thus, could pose as a challenge for application of this model of nursing to Muslim patients as it does not meet their holistic needs.

== First Muslim nurse ==
The first professional nurse in the history of Islam is a woman named Rufaidah bint Sa’ad, also known as Rufaida Al-Aslamia or Rufayda al-Aslamiyyah, who was born in 620 (est.) and lived at the time of Muhammed. She hailed from the Bani Aslam tribe in Medina and was among the first people in Medina to accept Islam. Rufaidah received her training and knowledge in medicine from her father, a physician, whom she assisted regularly. At the time when Muhammed's early followers were engaged in war, she led a group of volunteer nurses to the battlefield to treat and care for the injured and dying. After the Muslim state was established in Medina, she was given permission by Muhammed to set up a tent outside the mosque to treat the ill and to train more Muslim women and girls as nurses. Rufaidah is described as a woman possessing the qualities of an ideal nurse: compassionate, empathetic, a good leader and a great teacher. She is said to have provided health education to the community, helped the disadvantaged (like orphans and disabled people), advocated for preventative care, and even to have drafted the world’s first code of nursing ethics .

== Nursing in hospitals ==
In hospitals built in the Medieval Muslim society male nurses tended to male patients and female nurses to female patients. Historically, female nurses during the era of slavery in the Muslim world were often slaves, a tradition which continued in Saudi Arabia until the abolition of slavery in Saudi Arabia in 1962, where nursing was considered a dishonorable profession. The hospital in Al-Qayrawan (Kairouan in English) was especially unique among Muslim hospitals for several reasons. Built in 830 by the order of the Prince Ziyadat Allah I of Ifriqiya (817–838), the Al-Dimnah Hospital, constructed in the Dimnah region close to the great mosque of Al Qayrawan, was quite ahead of its time. It had the innovation of having a waiting area for visitors, not to mention that the first official female nurses were hired from Sudan to work in this hospital. Moreover, aside from regular physicians working there, a group of religious imams who also practiced medicine, called Fugaha al-Badan, provided service as well, likely by tending the patients’ spiritual needs.
