= Nursing in Hong Kong =

Details on the licensed professional occupation

Nursing is a licensed professional occupation in Hong Kong. The profession is regulated by the Nursing Council of Hong Kong, a statutory body. Nurses in Hong Kong are divided into registered nurses and enrolled nurses, with the former requiring more extensive professional training.

There are a total of 59,082 nurses in Hong Kong as of 2019, with the majority of registered nurses working for the Hospital Authority. Nursing education is provided by universities, post-secondary colleges, and hospital-based nursing schools.

== Regulation ==
Nursing practice in Hong Kong is regulated by the Nursing Council of Hong Kong (Chinese: 香港護士管理局), a statutory body established via the Nurses Registration Ordinance. The registration of nurses has been regulated since 1931.

Membership of the council consists of its director, a registered nurse in public service nominated by the Director of Health and appointed by the chief executive of Hong Kong, six registered nurses appointed by the chief executive, six registered or enrolled nurses elected for a term, two persons selected by the CE from people nominated by tertiary institutions providing nursing programmes, one member nominated by the Hospital Authority and appointed by the CE, one mental health nurse appointed by the CE, and three lay members appointed by the CE.

Nurses in Hong Kong are classified into registered nurses (RN; Chinese: 註冊護士) and enrolled nurses (EN; Chinese: 登記護士). RNs may handle patients independently, whereas ENs must work under the supervision of RNs. RNs have a higher academic and professional attainment and must train for a longer period of time; correspondingly, they also have higher salaries and may be promoted to higher positions such as Nursing Officer (Chinese: 護士長). In contrast, ENs do not have a clear path for promotion; in order for ENs to be promoted to higher positions, they must take further studies such as conversion or top-up courses. Psychiatric nurses have a higher starting salary than nurses serving general patients.

== Education ==
All nursing programmes in Hong Kong have to be approved by the Nursing Council of Hong Kong. Registered nurses must undergo at least 3 years of training, either via theoretical and practical training at a nursing school based in hospitals, or via a pre-registration nursing programme at a university or college; whereas, enrolled nurses must take a programme of at least 2 years in duration. Among programmes that lead to qualification as RNs, the Higher Diploma in Nursing programme offered by the Hospital Authority is 3 years in duration, while bachelor's degrees offered by universities and post-secondary colleges are 5 years in duration.

The following is a list of institutions offering nursing programmes as of 2020:

=== Universities ===
- University of Hong Kong
- Chinese University of Hong Kong
- Hong Kong Polytechnic University
- Hong Kong Metropolitan University

=== Approved post-secondary colleges ===
- Tung Wah College
- Caritas Institute of Higher Education
- School of Continuing Education, Hong Kong Baptist University
- Hong Kong Nang Yan College of Higher Education
- Hong Kong Adventist College

=== Nursing schools ===
==== Public hospitals ====
- Caritas Medical Centre
- Queen Elizabeth Hospital
- Tuen Mun Hospital
- Grantham Hospital

==== Private hospitals ====
- Hong Kong Baptist Hospital
- Hong Kong Sanatorium & Hospital
- St. Teresa's Hospital (Hong Kong)
- Union Hospital (Hong Kong)

== Representation ==
The Association of Hong Kong Nursing Staff (Chinese: 香港護士協會) is one of the largest medical unions in Hong Kong. The AHKNS was founded in 1977 and adopted its present name in 2007. According to its statistics, the AHKNS is the largest nursing union in Hong Kong, representing more than 60% of the city's nurses.

Nurses working for the Hospital Authority are additionally represented by the Hospital Authority Employees Alliance (Chinese: 醫管局員工陣線), a union registered in December 2019. According to the HAEA, the union had nearly 20,000 members as of February 2020, including nurses, doctors and supporting staff, representing around a quarter of all staff employed by the HA.

== Workforce ==
As of 2019, there were 44,601 RNs and 14,481 ENs in Hong Kong, for a total of 59,082 nurses. The attrition rate for nurses was 6.1% in 2018, with 95% of those resigning being lowest-level nurses.

According to the 2010 Health Manpower Survey conducted by the Department of Health, among RNs who indicated their gender, 10.2% were male while 89.8% were female. The median age of RNs was 46.0. 64.6% of RNs were working for the Hospital Authority, while others worked in the private sector, the Government, and academic and government-subsidised sectors.
