= Public health nursing =

Nursing speciality focused on public health

Public health nursing, also known as community health nursing, is a nursing specialty focused on public health. The term was coined by Lillian Wald of the Henry Street Settlement, or, Public health nurses (PHNs) or community health nurses "integrate community involvement and knowledge about the entire population with personal, clinical understandings of the health and illness experiences of individuals and families within the population." Public health nursing in the United States traces back to a nurse named Lillian Wald who, in 1893, established the Henry Street Settlement in New York City and coined the expression "public health nurse". A Public or Community Health Nurse is expected to comply with the duties and limitations of the American Nurse Association (ANA) publication Public Health Nursing: Scope and Standards of Practice.

Public health nurses work within communities and focus on different areas to improve the overall health of the people within that community. Some areas of employment for public health nurses are school districts, county or state health departments, and departments of correction. The public health nurse looks for areas of concern within the community and assesses and plans ways through which the concerns can be resolved or minimized. Some health concerns a public health nurse may work on are infection control, health maintenance, health coaching, as well as home care visits for welfare and to provide care to certain members of the community who may need it. The Centers for Disease Control and Prevention is a leading health indicator in preventing morbidity and mortality. Clinical preventative services such as immunizations and routine screenings for colorectal cancer, blood pressure control and diabetes management are key to improving the Nation's health.

Public health nursing focuses on betterment of the community as a whole. Public health nursing is used to promote and protect the population through knowledge of caring for patients at the bedside, in the community, and through social aspects. The public health nurse must assess the needs of the population and limitations to care. Interventions then must be planned and put into place to produce the best possible outcome for the patient. The community health nurse then evaluates effectiveness of the plan while making changes. In combination, this allows the community health nurse to incorporate the community with the health of the patient.

== Credentials ==
To become a Public Health Nurse (PHN), one must be a Registered Nurse, licensed by the state and must possess a Baccalaureate Degree. The ANA offers an ANCC credential for specialized Public Health Nursing known as the Advanced Public Health Nursing-Board Certified (APHN-BC) credential. In some states, no additional education is required to begin working as a Public Health Nurse. Some jobs require a Public Health Nurse Certificate and most jobs require on the job training. This certificate is offered at many institutions across the United States and many can be completed online such as the National Board of Public Health Examiners' Certification in Public Health (NBPHE). This certification requires a bachelor's degree, five years of public health work experience as well as the passing of the exam. This exam covers many fields of study including leadership, ethics, program administration, policies and health equity.

Due to COVID-19, there is a great need for more healthcare professionals in all scopes of practice. As responders to public health emergencies, Public Health Nurses play a major role in providing care to the communities in which they serve. Their role during a pandemic involves providing education, especially to those that have tested positive or been exposed and need to isolate. They also participate in hotlines where the community members can call with questions and give up to date information from the Center for Disease Control. The role of the PHN encompasses promoting healthy lifestyles, identifying people at risk for diseases, and aid in disease prevention which are all ever so important currently.

There are four major actions that PHN organizations can take to promote and expand PHN certification: (1) increase awareness, (2) provide education and coaching on the advanced PHN certification by portfolio process, (3) expand the definition of practice hours for certification to be more inclusive of population‐level practice particularly for faculty whose ability to accrue practice hours is limited by teaching, scholarship, and service demands, and (4) reinstitute BSN certification. Increasing awareness of the PHN certification and support for applicants is critical to the continued viability of this certification. PHN organizations can accomplish this through a comprehensive credentialing marketing campaign including dissemination of promotional materials, collaborative conferences, webinars, and strategies. PHN organizations can target local and state health departments, school districts, colleges and universities, and other nursing associations. The initial focus will be master's‐prepared nurses as there is currently not a credentialing mechanism for baccalaureate‐prepared nurses.

== Background ==
Public health nurses deliver planned activities that require to protect and promote health in patients that require care. Public health is fundamental to the UK's philosophy for health achievement and attainment over time. It is a central feature of the contemporary health strategy which sets to prepare the way for the population's health and wellbeing up to 2030 and is widely accepted to be everyone's business. There are three main objectives for public health nurses: to prevent illness in individuals and promote healthy lifestyle, protect individuals from disease by the use of immunizations and by monitoring the disease process, and by creating long-term changes in communities through education and health promoting activities. Obviously, correct implementation of the nursing care program is vital in the process of educating and providing guidance to vulnerable families and community groups in order to empower family self-care.

Public health nurses focus on the entire community's population along with the individual and family population. Community and Public Health Nurses apply health promotion and preventative health concepts to individuals, families, groups, aggregates, and populations with an upstream focus in a variety of settings. They put an emphasis on preventative care and basic health education. Their goal is to reduce disease and improve the quantity and quality of life of the general public. Public health nurses work in a variety of settings such as public health agencies, non-profit groups, and educational organizations. They collaborate with health planners and policy makers to make changes and act as an advocate for a particular community. They analyze the issues and patterns within a community and assist in developing interventions or strategies for more effective outcomes. (apaulCSU)

Public health nurses may practice in the community on their own, or within a group of several public health nurses. Either way, the public health nurse engages the patient and the community to generate a fruitful outcome. Interventions and strategies may be targeted on the functional level of the patient, promoting return to baseline functioning, or improvement. Strategies for success are aimed at an entire population, group, family, or individual. Through interventions and strategies, the public health nurse can aim at prevention of illness, injury or disability, the promotion of health, and the maintenance of health populations.

Apart from prevention of illness, public health nurses also focus on the promotion of health and maintenance of the health of certain populations. Their role is to keep the public safe and respond to community needs. They provide a linkage between epidemiological data and clinical understanding of health issues. Public health education has been essential throughout the years for preventing certain conditions. Promoting vaccinations and infection control techniques has assisted the public in reducing contagious disease transmission. Nurses are needed at every aspect of public work from education campaigns to implementation of hygiene and sanitation initiatives. (apaulCSU)

Dissemination and implementation (D&I) science is an emerging priority in public health and medicine. There is an interest from the National Academy of Medicine, the National Institutes of Health, and the World Health Organization in narrowing the gap between research (what we know) and practice (what we do). As a rapidly growing field, application of science has focused on understanding factors and strategies that influence the initial adoption and integration of evidence-based interventions (EBIs) in real-world settings; whereas significant advancements have been made in understanding the adoption and implementation of EBIs across a range of community and health care settings, less is known about their sustainability. Recently, experts have prioritized sustainability as an unexplored area, identifying it as “one of the most significant translational research problems of our time” and as a persistent challenge across a range of settings and service delivery sectors, and across health behaviors and outcomes (Shelton et al., 2018).

== See also ==
- History of nursing in the United States
- History of public health in the United States
