= Nursing in Kenya =

Nursing in Kenya began in 1908 and was conducted without a formal framework until 1950. Over the decades, with demand for healthcare providers increasing due to marked growth in the population of Kenya, training programs were implemented.

== History ==
In 1908, nursing in Kenya began when missionaries who visited Kenya provided training. The first nurses were primarily male and were known as "dressers." Their primary responsibilities included dressing wounds, administering injections, and managing hospitals.

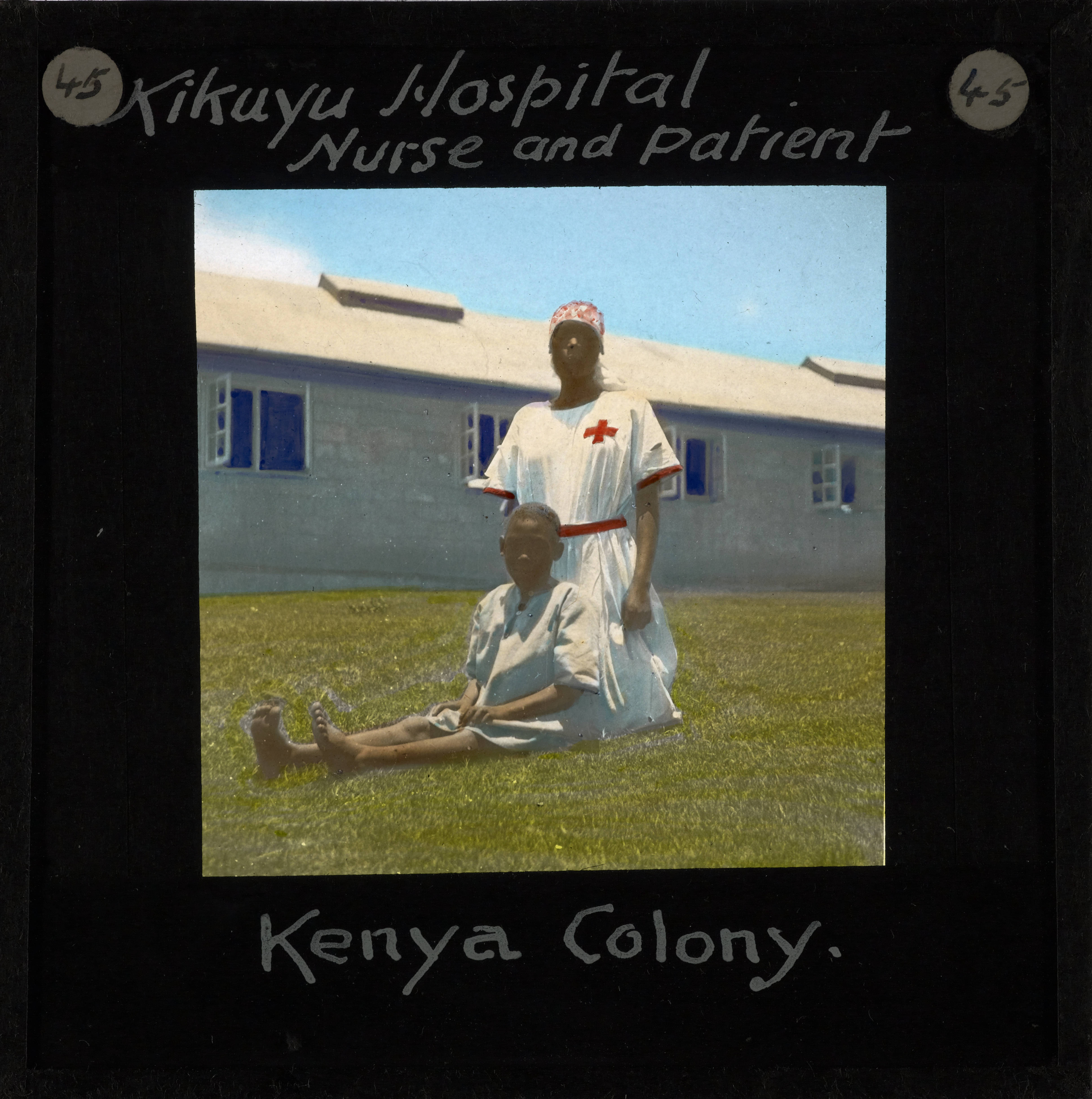
A Kikuyu hospital nurse with a patient, early 20th cent.

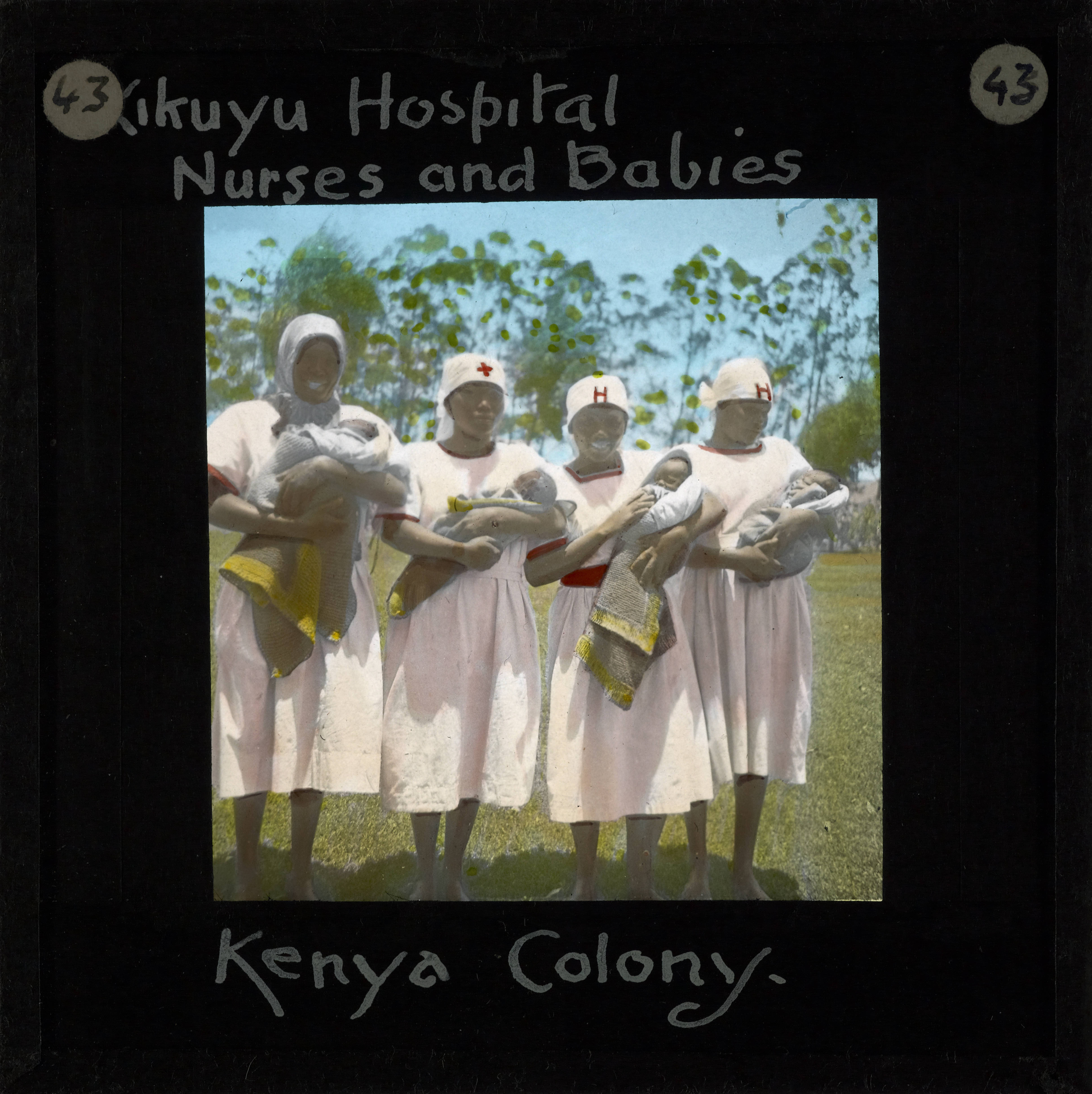
Kikuyu hospital nurses and babies, early 20th cent.

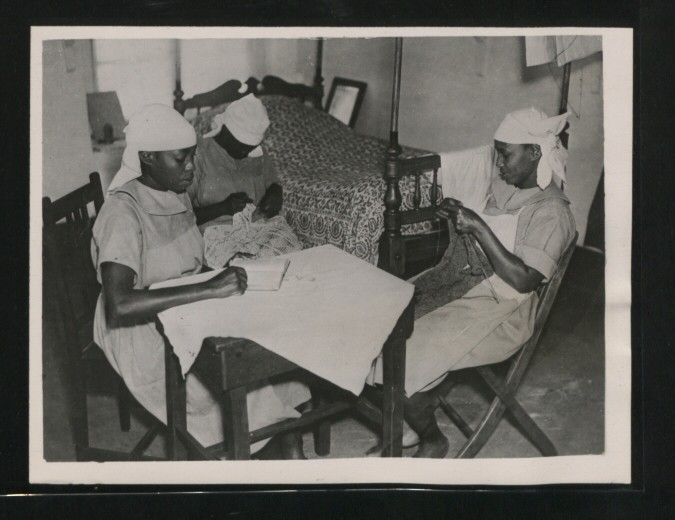
Off duty time for African nurses at Fort Hall. (Picture issued 1945)

Before 1950, nursing in Kenya was conducted without a formal framework. Most health care institutions provided in-service training for healthcare workers, to assist the whites in the provision of required healthcare, thus making it difficult to identify healthcare workers according to their level of training and scope of practice. In 1950 meeting of the Nurses and Midwives Council of Kenya members passed a resolution that formally described the different cadres of nurses who were practising nursing in Kenya at that time. The titles of State Registered Nurse, Kenya Registered Nurse, and Assistant Registered Nurse Grade 1 and 2 remained in force on the basis of Registration and Training.

In 1952, the Examination Sub-Committee held its first examination for Assistant Enrolled Nurses Grade I and II. Approval of training schools was required to be done by the relevant training schools sub-committee, whilst the inspection of schools would be done every three years.

The King George Hospital Kenyatta National Hospital became the first hospital to start the Kenya Registered Nurse training programme. The course was approved to run for 3 ½ years, with the Preliminary Training Service (PTS) to extend over 3 months, followed by a period of 3 months ward rotation and 3 years of theory and clinical training.

1980s there was a marked growth in the population of Kenya. As a result of the rapid development going on in the country at that time, there was an increase in rural-urban migration, resulting in an uneven distribution of resources, with particular reference to human resources. There was also a growing need for health care providers to engage in effective healthcare management strategies, to be able to reach every part of the population. 1987 the Kenya Registered Community Health Nurse (KRCHN) training was commenced, to prepare nurses who would be able to give comprehensive care to the communities. 1990s, due to expansion and emergence of complex disease patterns among populations such as HIV/AIDS, cancer, cardiac conditions, the Nursing Council of Kenya approved the preparation of nurses at bachelors level because the effective management of such patients requires highly skilled and trained personnel who would be able to engage in critical thinking and sound decision-making.

2013, approved-nursing-courses-council-Kenya 19 programmes had been approved, as health care learning institutions continue to recognise the need to build capacity to facilitate health care management and practice at all levels.

== Nursing regulation ==
Before the establishment of the Nursing Council of Kenya (NCK) under the Nurses Cap 257 of the Laws of Kenya, the activities of the council were governed by Ordinances. Ordinance number 16 of 4 June 1946 was the first governing tool to be authorised by the Colony and Protectorate of Kenya to address health issues and activities of the nurses in the then Kenya Colony.

In 1983, the council was finally acknowledged by an Act of Parliament under the Nurses Act Cap 257 of the Laws of Kenya as the "Nursing Council of Kenya".

=== Mandate ===
The core functions of the Nursing Council of Kenya are to establish and improve standards of all branches of the nursing profession in all their aspects and to safeguard the interest of all nurses. The council establishes and continues to improve the standards of professional nursing and of health care within the community. With the approval of the minister, the council:

- Establishes and maintains standards of nursing profession and safeguards the interests of nurses and health care within the community
- Makes provision for the training and instruction of persons seeking registration under the Nurses Act
- Regulates syllabi and curricula
- Prescribes and conducts examinations
- Has regard to the conduct of persons under the Act and takes disciplinary measures
- Has regard to the standards of nursing care, qualified staff, facilities conditions and environment
- Compiles and keeps records and registers
- Approves uniforms and other insignia
- Advises the minister on matters concerning all aspects of nursing

== Nursing programmes ==
Nurses in Kenya fall into two main categories:

- Registered Nurses
- Enrolled Nurses

=== Basic cadres ===
- Kenya Enrolled Nurse _{[Phased Out]}
- Kenya Enrolled Midwifery _{[Phased Out]}
- Kenya Enrolled Community Health Nurse [Basic]
- Kenya Registered Community Health Nurse [Basic]
- Kenya Registered Nurse
- Kenya Registered Nurse Midwife
- Bachelor of Science in Nursing

=== Post basic cadres ===
- Kenya Enrolled Community Health Nurse [Post Basic]
- Kenya Registered Community Health Nurse [Post Basic]
- Kenya Registered Anaesthetic Nurse
- Kenya Registered Critical Care Nurse
- Kenya Registered Mental Health Nurse
- Kenya Registered Midwife
- Kenya Registered Nephrology Nurse
- Kenya Registered Ophthalmic Nurse
- Kenya Registered Paediatric Nurse
- Kenya registered paediatric critical care Nurse
- Kenya Registered Peri-Operative Nurse
- Kenya Registered Accident and Emergency Nurse
- Kenya Registered Palliative Care Nursing
