= Rufaida Al-Aslamia =

Arab medical and social worker

Rufayda Al-Aslamia

Personal life
- Born: c. 620 AD (approx. 2 BH) Hejaz, Arabia
- Home town: Medina

Religious life
- Religion: Islam

Rufayda Al-Aslamia (Arabic: رفيدة الأسلمية) (born 620 AD) was an Arab medical and social worker recognized as the first female Muslim nurse in Islam.

== Early life ==
=== Personal background ===
Among the first people in Medina to accept Islam, Rufaida Al-Aslamia was born into the Bani Aslem tribe of the Kazraj tribal confederation in Medina, and gained popularity for her contribution with other Ansar women who welcomed the Islamic prophet, Muhammad, on arrival in Medina.

=== Familial ties to medicine ===
Born into a family with ties to the medical community, Rufaida's father, Sa`ad Al Aslamy, was a physician and mentor under whom Rufaida initially obtained clinical experience, becoming a nurse.

Although not given responsibilities held solely by men such as surgeries and amputations, Rufaida Al-Aslamia practiced her skills in her tent as Muhammad used to order all casualties to be carried to her tent, treating them with medical expertise.

Rufaida also provided care to injured soldiers during the jihad, as well as providing shelter from the wind and heat of the desert for the dying.

== History of female nursing in Arabia ==
=== Pre-Islamic and Islamic era (570–632 AD) ===
Though Muslims placed a high value on the ritual cleansing of the body, daily prayer schedules, and strict dietary regimens, medicinal treatment during the times of Muhammad was performed solely by doctors. They would visit the patient to diagnose abnormalities and provide medications to those who were in need.

Placing the bulk of the biological and physiological responsibilities of a patient on the doctor, nurses were limited in their duties to provide physical comfort and emotional support.

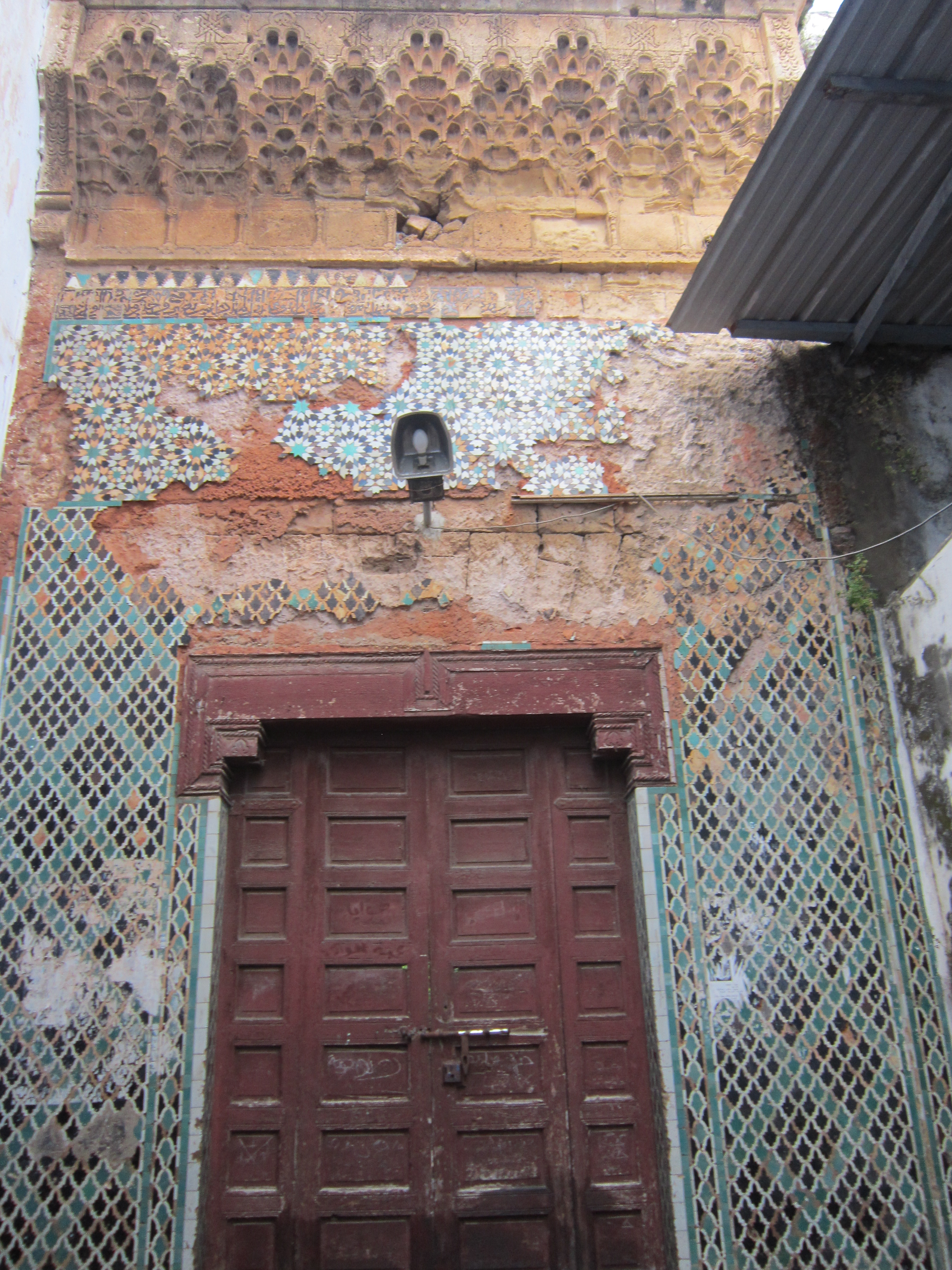
Front door of ancient hospital of Salé in Morocco designed by Islamic architects and managed by ancient Islamic physicians

=== Post-prophetic to Middle Ages era (632–1500 AD) ===
With the diminishing intensity of holy wars and mass civil unrest, advancements in technology resulted in many new hospitals and methods for treating the sick.

Though nurses in this period were still relegated to rudimentary and noninvasive duties, religious and social norms of the times necessitated the segregation of hospital wards based on gender, with males treating males and females treating females. There has also been relaxation of segregation in contemporary times.

== Revolutions in nursing development ==
=== Emergence as nursing leader ===
Rufaida Al-Aslamia, who practiced at the time of Muhammad, was the first Muslim nurse. While there is controversy in who is the first surgeon and nurse in history, Middle Eastern countries attribute the status of the first-ever nurse to Rufaida.

=== Acute care origins ===
Rufaida Al-Aslamia implemented her clinical skills and medical experience into developing the first-ever documented mobile care units that were able to meet the medical needs of the community.

The scope of her work in her organized medical command units consisted primarily in hygiene and stabilizing patients before further and more invasive medical procedures. During military expeditions, she participated in the battles of Khandaq, Khaibar, and others.

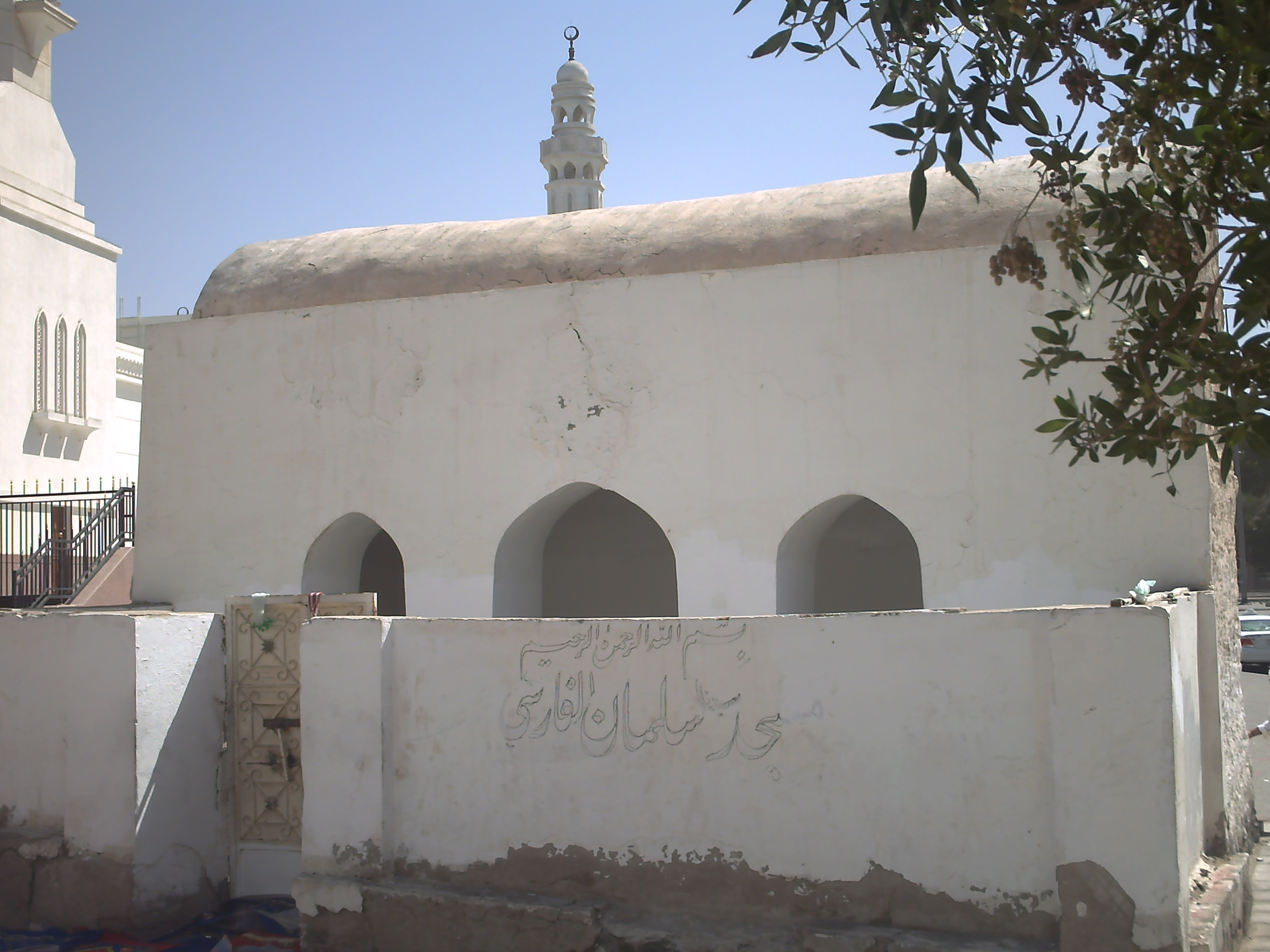
The Mosque at Salaman, location of the Battle of The Trench where Al-Aslamia treated the injured

During times of peace, Rufaida Al-Aslamia continued her involvement with humanitarian efforts by providing assistance to Muslims who were in need.

== Legacy ==
Rufaida trained a group of women companions as nurses. When Muhammad's army was getting ready to go to the battle of Khaybar, Rufaida and the group of volunteer nurses went to Muhammad and asked him for permission, "O' Messenger of Allah, we want to go out with you to the battle, and treat the injured and help Muslims as much as we can". Muhammad permitted them to go. Later, Muhammad assigned a share of the bounty from the battle to Rufaida.

=== Rufaida Al-Aslamia Prize in Nursing ===
Each year, the Royal College of Surgeons in Ireland at the University of Bahrain awards one student the Rufaida Al-Aslamia Prize in Nursing. The award winner determined by a panel of senior clinical medical staff members, the Rufaida Al-Aslamia Prize in Nursing is given to the student who consistently excels in delivering superb nursing care to patients.
