= History of Filipino nurses in the United States =

Since the 1890s, the United States has periodically relied upon Filipino nurses to help meet the needs of the healthcare system. This collaboration has been a significant contributor to the migration of Filipinos to the U.S., as Filipino citizens increasingly had personal connections in America. Since 1960, more than 150,000 nurses have migrated from the Philippines.

== Early history (1898–1930) ==
After the Spanish–American War (1898), the U.S. acquired control over the Philippines and conferred U.S. national status upon the islands' population. The U.S. Army trained and recruited Filipinos as Volunteer Auxiliary and Contract Nurses to serve in the Philippines, focusing on tropical diseases. The hospitals founded served two U.S. interests: treating their soldiers and exporting Western "civilized" culture to the Philippines. Several nurses were sent to San Francisco and New York City for further training and employment. In 1907, formalized nursing education patterned on the U.S. curriculum was established in the Philippines to train nurses there. A shortage of nurses was increasingly urgent due to the epidemics of tuberculosis, typhoid and other communicable disease and the start of World War I. The Pensionado Act (1903) established and legislated a formalized framework to send Filipino pensionados (government subsidized scholars) to the United States for further education and training. Some stayed in the U.S. for employment. A continuous influx of Filipino nurses worked in New York City, and helped to meet to the demands of healthcare at that time. The Philippine Nurses Association – New York was established in 1928 by the Filipino nurses with the goals of promoting cultural understanding and streamlining professional guidance to other Filipino nurses. The first president was Marta Ubana, who completed her Bachelor of Science in Teachers College, Columbia University.

== 1940s-1970s ==
=== Exchange Visitor Program ===
In 1948, Congress passed the Smith-Mundt Act, which created the Exchange Visitor Program. The program allowed students and skilled workers to stay in the U.S. for a two-year period to promote cultural exchange. While the program was largely intended to counteract propaganda disseminated by the Soviet Union at the outset of the Cold War, it came at a time when the U.S. had again found itself in the midst of a postwar nursing shortage. Hospitals quickly began sponsoring Filipino women who had been trained in U.S.-style nursing programs abroad. For this reason, despite being open to all countries, the EVP induced a wave of Filipino migration. By the late 1960s, Filipino applicants, the vast majority of whom were nurses, made up 80% of participants in the program.

=== Immigration and Nationality Act ===
In 1965, Congress passed the Immigration and Nationality Act, which made it easier for Filipino nurses to petition to stay in the U.S. permanently. In addition, hospitals had caught on to the fact that many of their nurses came from the Philippines and started actively recruiting women to come. The Act had a provision which created a visa for skilled laborers. As a result, nurses could now not only come permanently, but bring their families as well. This brought a wave of immigrants from the Philippines, some of whom may have been taking advantage of the program. In the years immediately after the passage of the INA, board exam passing rates for nurses from the Philippines were very low, leading to the establishment of the Commission on Graduates of Foreign Nursing Schools.

The same year that the INA was passed, Medicare and Medicaid were also created, making healthcare more accessible for millions of Americans who had limited access. Nineteen million Americans enrolled in the programs' first year. The demand for healthcare workers in the U.S. once more outpaced its supply.

Ferdinand Marcos, the president of the Philippines from 1966-1986, saw the emigration of nurses as a potential solution to a domestic economic crisis. The country was struggling with high rates of unemployment. Nurses living abroad decreased the amount of competition within the job market. Wages were also drastically lower in the Philippines than the U.S.; during the 1970s, a nurse in the Philippines would have to work nearly 12 years to make the equivalent of one year's salary for a Filipino nurses in the U.S., creating a very powerful incentive to emigrate. Further, many nurses continued to send money home to family overseas, which Marcos hoped might stimulate the economy. Marcos actively encouraged the emigration of nurses as a means to stabilize the economy. This temporary effort became formalized as a program to encourage the export of nurses. While the program was intended to be a temporary, it became deeply embedded in the nation's economy and did not end until 2022. In 2005, 85% of the Philippine's nurses were employed internationally.

== 1980s-Present ==
=== AIDS Crisis ===
During the 1980s, HIV/AIDS was discovered, first becoming apparent in the metropolitan centers and then widening to a nationwide crisis. The disease was initially thought to be unique to men who have sex with men, with the earliest reports of AIDS-related Kaposi's Sarcoma being described as a "gay cancer." While this was quickly proven untrue, the idea of HIV/AIDS as a "gay disease" remained prominent. This contributed to the stigma against the disease and people affected by it. This association, combined with the initial lack of understanding as to how the virus was transmitted and the fear that that caused, led to the refusal by many medical professionals to treat people with AIDS. In 1986, the American Medical Association released guidelines allowing physicians who were "emotionally unable" to care for AIDS patients to refer them to another clinician.

The shortage of willing medical staff led to another influx of migration from the Philippines. In fact, the Filipino population of the United States doubled between 1980 and 1990.

=== Nursing Relief Act of 1989 ===
In 1989, in recognition of the large wave of Filipino nurses throughout the AIDS crisis, Congress passed the Nursing Relief Act. The Act granted special immigrant status to nurses, which allowed them to apply for green cards, and did not set a limit on the number of visas that could be issued under the program. This allowed many nurses who may have had to leave their families behind to bring them to the U.S. This bill had strong backing from the government of the Philippines, which hoped that nurses might send money back home and stimulate the economy.

=== COVID-19 Pandemic ===
The high influx of patients in hospitals and intensive care units during the COVID-19 pandemic was a strain on healthcare systems globally, though it had a particular impact on Filipino nurses in the U.S. Despite making up only 4% of the nation's registered nurses, 25% of deaths among RNs during the pandemic were Filipino. The reasons for this are multiple: Filipino nurses are more likely to work in ICUs and bedside roles than their white counterparts. Further, rates of diabetes and hypertension, which increase one's risk of severe illness from COVID-19, are higher among the Filipino population. There were widespread shortages of PPE during the early pandemic, which elevated the risk to healthcare providers in general, but deaths were disproportionately increased among Filipino nurses due to these risk factors. In California, a state with an especially high proportion of Filipino nurses, Governor Gavin Newsom's mandate to increase the number of patients assigned to each nurse compounded these issues.

== Treatment and labor conditions ==
While nurses are paid far higher in the U.S. than in the Philippines, they have nonetheless been subjected to exploitative practices.

Filipino nurses have, at times, been targeted by aggressive recruiting campaigns that were often deceptive about what benefits they could offer. In the 1980s, the Filipina Nurses Organizing Project (FNOP) partnered with the Philippine Center for Immigrant Rights to pursue legal action against Philippine Overseas Employment Agency, which licensed recruiters who falsely promised nurses green cards and living accommodations. Once in the U.S., the recruiters took heavy cuts of nurses' pay, confiscated their passports, and provided inadequate living space, sometimes assigning as many as eight nurses to a single studio apartment. The organizations were successful in having these dishonest recruiters stripped of their certification with the Filipino government.

In the 1980s and 1990s, FNOP was key is lobbying for a number of labor protections for Filipino nurses, including hospital-sponsored H1-B visas, improved living conditions, and equal pay with nonimmigrant workers.

In 2019, 200 Filipino nurses successfully sued a group of New York nursing homes for human trafficking. Nurses were lied to about working conditions, paid less than the amount stated in their contracts, and provided inadquate staff.

== See also ==
- Brain drain
- Filipino American
- Overseas Filipino
