= Agnes Jones =

Agnes Jones may refer to:

- Agnes Jones (nurse)
- Agnes Jones (The Bold and the Beautiful)

== See also ==
- Agnes Jones Adams, early pioneer for the advancement of black women's clubs
