= Katharine Jane Densford =

American nurse and academic (1890–1978)

Katharine Jane Densford MA, RN
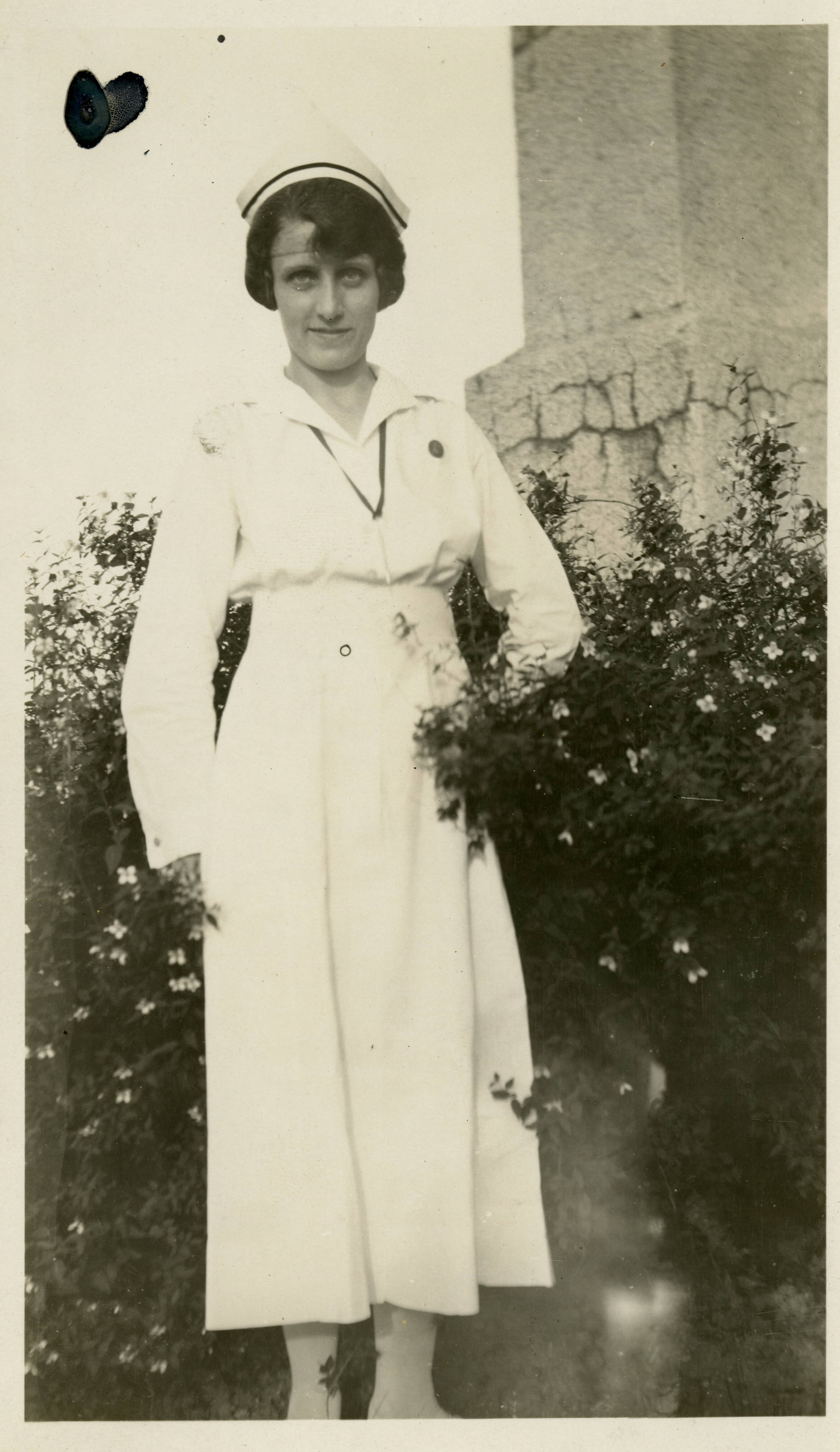
- Densford in Cincinnati, 1923
- Born: Katharine Jane Densford; December 7, 1890; Crothersville, Indiana, U.S.
- Died: September 29, 1978 (aged 87); Saint Paul, Minnesota, U.S.
- Citizenship: USA
- Education: Miami University; University of Chicago; Vassar Training Camp for Nurses; University of Cincinnati
- Occupation: 1930–1959 Director of the University of Minnesota School of Nursing
- Years active: 1918–1970
- Employer: University of Minnesota
- Organization: School of Nursing
- Known for: Leadership
- Predecessor: Marion L. Vannier, RN
- Successor: Edna L. Fritz, EdD, RN
- Spouse: Carl Dreves

Katharine Jane Densford (1890–1978) was an American nurse who made important contributions to nursing education and to nursing services during World War II. Densford was Director of the University of Minnesota School of Nursing, serving in that position from 1930 to 1959. Densford's leadership of Minnesota's flagship school of nursing, located in the Minneapolis-Saint Paul area, provided the model for nursing education throughout the state and nation. Her pragmatic leadership during World War II made a significant contribution to the United States war effort.

== Early life ==
Katharine Jane Densford (1890–1978) was born in Crothersville, Indiana in 1890. In her late teens, she was hired by a family friend to teach fourth, fifth and sixth grades at a girls' "industrial school" which was a boarding school for girls as young as eight years old, who were termed 'delinquents', located in Indiana. Besides teaching the full curriculum for those grades, she also instructed in 'manual training'. She earned her B.A. degree, magna cum laude, at Miami University, Oxford, Ohio, and then earned her M.A. in history at the University of Chicago, Chicago. She returned then to teaching, first Latin and German at a high school in Harbor Springs, Michigan, and then History for several years in a Bismarck, North Dakota high school. The outbreak of World War I caused her to evaluate how to best serve her country, and she decided to become a nurse. (Note: Densford noted, "it seemed that nurses were needed more than teachers, and since I was the only member of the family free to go to war, I should go into nursing.".)

== Professional nursing career ==
By 1920, she graduated from the Vassar Training Camp for Nurses, where she completed an intensive three-month educational program. Next she earned a two-year clinical nursing degree at the School of Nursing and Health of the University of Cincinnati.

In 1925, she transitioned away from bedside nursing practice to education leadership. She become the Assistant Dean of the Illinois Training School for Nurses (program merged in 1926 into the University of Chicago's School of Nursing and ceased to exist in 1929) where she also taught public health and tuberculosis nursing, and gained leadership experience. She also served as assistant dean and associate director of Nursing Service for the Cook County Hospital in Chicago.

In 1930, she became professor and director of the University of Minnesota School of Nursing, a tenure that lasted until she retired in 1959. The University of Minnesota (UMN) was the world's first school of nursing within a university, and Densford continued and expanded the nursing program at UMN throughout her tenure, based on a set of policies she established early on the defined the quality of the program. Nursing education otherwise had been following an apprenticeship model and was conducted exclusively in hospital settings. During her tenure, School of Nursing faculty began providing bedside instruction, ensuring that students learned from the most-prepared people available.

== In response to the Great Depression ==
In response to the high unemployment rates for nurses during the Great Depression in the 1930s, Densford collaborated with hospitals and the university to create a "Learn and Earn program". In that program, nurses worked in the clinical practice area (without compensation) while enrolling in university courses tuition-free, earning credits to apply toward baccalaureate and advanced degrees, and getting room and board free within that program as well.

Densford's focus on finding and retaining talent resulted in several important hires in the 1930s, including Cecilia Hauge, Myrtle Hodgkins (later known as Mrs. John Coe), Mildred Montag, Frances Lucier, Ruth D. Johnson, Julia Miller and Ruth Harrington. During 1937–1938 Densford and Hauge went for 6 months to Europe, to attend the International Council of Nurses ICN meeting in London. Lucile Petry took her place as acting director. Densford had been with the ICN since 1929 and continued to be active in it for the rest of her career. She also travelled in Russia during that period, and took further training at Teachers College, Columbia University.

Densford continued throughout the 1930s to improve the School of Nursing's programs in terms of content, teaching, and patient care. Powell Hall was opened in October, 1933 as a 300-unit dormitory for student nurses, which connected by tunnel to Elliot Hospital, the UMN hospital site at the time. In 1939, for the school's thirtieth anniversary, the building was renamed in honor of Louise Powell. The Louise M. Powell Hall was the first building at the University of Minnesota to be named for a living person.

== Nursing leadership during World War II ==
=== Direct War Services ===
Densford released Hauge and Petry and many others for direct war services in leadership positions, who were replaced by bringing back retired nurses, local sourcing, and having all faculty increase their teaching load. Cecilia Hauge was chief nurse for 26th General Hospital, serving at multiple locations around Europe. Lucille Petry went to Washington to work with the Surgeon General to help facilitate nursing education around the county. Ruth Harrington went to D.C. to serve with the National League of Nursing Education

As early as August 1940, the UMN School of Nursing under Densford's leadership started planning for the creation of the 26th General Hospital. As of October of that year, the designation was official, and efforts began to locate and recruit 120 nurses. In January 1942, Hauge and her team officially went on war footing. The University of Minnesota's 26th General Hospital left for Oklahoma with 50 doctors, 7 dentists, and 108 nurses in February, 1942.

=== Nursing recruitment and training ===
Densford then turned to recruiting nurses for the war effort. Densford made nationwide appeals encouraging women to become nurses, stressing the wartime need for nursing as well as the permanent peacetime opportunities.

The Bolton Nurse Training Act passed by congress in June, 1943 provided federal funds for housing and training costs of educating nurses, and created the Cadet Nurse Corps. Opened in July, 1943, by November her program was honored nationally for enrolling the most nurses of any institution in the country. (Note: November 27, 1943: Between halves at the Iowa Seahawks-Minnesota Game at Memorial stadium, Saturday, national recognition for the United States cadet nurse corps at the university came from Dr. Thomas Parran, surgeon general of the United States Public Health Service. In a telegram read over the loudspeaker system, Dr. Parran congratulated the school of nursing at the "U" for enrolling in the corps the largest number of student nurses of any institution in the Country.)

Densford managed to find housing for these large numbers of students, find classroom space (including at Northrop Auditorium), and find teachers – despite most trained faculty having gone to war themselves already. Due to the extreme need for students, Densford and the University were able to use federal funds from the Bolton Act to partially fund an addition to Powell Hall. (Note: Densford remarked, "We accelerated the programs to the limit, and the girls couldn't work harder; but still there was a need for twice as many as we had the facilities to train.") While class sizes increased and instruction was accelerated to get students into the field as soon as possible, remaining faculty also served on civil defense committees and took on additional training responsibilities in the area of home health.

By January 1945, the wartime need for nurses was critical. General Norman T. Kirk, Surgeon General of the Army, characterized the shortage as the most critical since Pearl Harbor. Hospital units were going overseas with no nurses aboard. The ratio of nurses per enlisted men in overseas military hospitals had dropped from 120 per 500 to 83 per 450. At the same time, U.S. civilian hospitals were caring for 60 to 70 patients at a time with a nursing staff of only one nurse and one assistant. President Roosevelt announced that due to the urgent need, he wanted to mobilize greater numbers by use of forced induction. Nationwide reaction included concern from many communities that were already operating despite drastically reduced nursing staff. The shortage was caused in part by mixed messages from the military and Red Cross on the need for nurses, many nurses had gone to private nursing after being turned away from active service. In some communities, sufficient nurses to meet quota had already signed up and were on waiting lists for physical examinations or assignments.

=== Nursing draft ===
Densford testified as head of the American Nurses Association (ANA) before the House Military Committee in February 1945 that sufficient nurses were already available, but that bureaucracy had hindered their progress. The number of nurses willing to volunteer would be available if the War Manpower Commission, or another government department, were given the power to make necessary changes. She also suggested that black nurses and male nurses be allowed to serve their country. In testimony before the Senate Military Affairs Committee in March, Densford stated that nurses who have applied for military service had waited as long as seven months for assignment.

The draft bill stalled in the Senate and was later withdrawn. By June 1945, the U.S. Army directed the Red Cross to stop taking applications, as they had all the nurses they needed from voluntary enlistment.

=== Rural nursing ===
Densford had been concerned about the provision of nursing services in rural areas already, but the war made the situation even more severe. She launched a summer demonstration project in 1943, and the School of Nursing worked with the state Division of Public Health Nursing to coordinate a training program for 1944–1948 that served senior Cadet Nurse Corps students. Those students spent three-month periods in one of five participating programs around the state. In 1948, 40 graduates of the program accepted positions among the 5 hospitals.

== Post-war Period ==
=== International activities ===
Densford was president of the American Nurses Association (ANA) from 1944 to 1948. During her presidency, the American Nurses Association hosted the International Council of Nurses in 1947 at Atlantic City. The Ninth ICN Quadrennial Congress – attended by 700 nurse representatives and over 5,000 delegates representing 250,000 nurses in 32 countries – was a major step forward in re-establishing international peacetime relations in the healthcare community. Densford was in charge of all arrangements (along with Ella Best, Secretary) which included locating lodgings for attendees among local residents, and raising funds to cover travel costs. (Note: 'The Farewell': When this great postwar Congress came to a close, the ties harshly strained by war had been reknit and greatly strengthened.".) Also during her term the ANA enacted a five-point program to increase the number of nurses in the US.

=== Progress against Racial Discrimination ===
Early in the post-war years, the ANA opened its membership to black nurses. Authorized at the 1946 Biennial and enacted during the 1948 House of Delegates meeting, the ANA changed its membership requirements for the purpose of enabling black nurses to join. Since ANA membership existed through state membership, and southern state organizations banned black nurses from joining, those black nurses had also been effectively banned from ANA membership. The ANA waived the requirement of state organization membership so that individual nurses who, due to their race, were not permitted membership in their state chapter could join ANA. The final vote in 1948 was by anonymous paper ballot. Also during that same meeting, the Alumnae Association of the Freedmen's Hospital School of Nursing presented a resolution urging those nine state nurses associations to drop that membership restriction. The House of Delegates accepted that resolution.

=== Korean connection ===
In the aftermath of the Korean War, the dean of the Medical School, Harold Diehl, invited Densford and the School of Nursing to join with several colleges of the University of Minnesota to help Korea rebuild. The University entered into a contract with the International Cooperation Administration (of the U.S. State Department) for the period from 1954 to 1959 originally, which was extended after that. The contract was to strengthen and develop the Seoul National University's education and research programs. The four units at the University of Minnesota that were involved in this project were nursing, medical, agricultural, and engineering. Densford arranged for American nurses to go and work in Seoul for 6 months, while Korean nurses would travel to Minnesota for the same period. This project was crucial in establishing the School of Nursing at Seoul National University.

Margery Low, R.N., M.A., went to Korea in 1957 and stayed until December 1958. Her work centered on assisting nursing administration and nursing education. At the time she arrived, the nursing course was described as being similar to a high school level of technical education. D. Joan Williams, B.S., M.N.A., went next, and she was in Korea in 1959. Her focus was on improving nursing services in the hospital and clinical training for the students. Florence Julian, B.S., M.N.A. went to Korea in January 1960, and remained until April 1961. That period coincided with a great deal of change. Miss Julian focused on coordinating between the nursing service and nursing education. She also introduced the Kardex system of nursing documentation. Faculty members from Seoul National University traveled to the University of Minnesota as well, including Lee Kwi Hyong, director of the SNU School of Nursing, and Lee Song Hi, surgical supervisor. A total of 77 nurse educators traveled to Minnesota during this project, and almost 20 students. As a result of this project, the status of nursing was improved in Korea, and the nursing education program was transformed.

=== Rural nursing ===
Densford worked with the W. K. Kellogg Foundation and the Minnesota League for Nursing Education to develop rural nursing into a clinical specialty. Mabel Larson Roach took responsibility for coordinating the statewide program, which included six rural hospitals and nine urban schools of nursing. These activities expanded to the School of Agriculture, which Densford worked with to provide a course on home management and practical nursing. Direct experience training in this program was not limited to hospital settings, but included community settings such as 4-H groups, churches, and other organizations. Additional groups supported these programs, including the Farm Bureau and the communities themselves, and they were in place in that format through 1963. After that point, several diverse programs have continued to exist, including a Rural Nurse Practitioners Project.

== Academic and Career Honors ==
Densford was active throughout her career in many nursing organizations. She was president of the Minnesota League of Nursing Education (1932–1936), president of the Minnesota Nurses Association (1936–1937), second vice-president of the International Council of Nurses (1947–1957), president of Alpha Tau Delta, National Fraternity for Professional Nurses (1936–1938) and president of Sigma Theta Tau, International Honor Society of Nursing (1941–1945). She served as Chair of the Minnesota Nursing Council for War Service (1941–1944). She also chaired the first fund-raising campaign for the American Nurses Foundation after retiring.

In 1984, Densford was inducted in to the American Nurses Association Hall of Fame.

In 1959, Densford was honored to give the presentation at the all-university Cap and Gown Day. She was the first woman to give the address.

Weaver-Densford Hall, built in 1980 for use by the schools of pharmacy and nursing, was named in honor of Densford in 1997. It is also named for Lawrence Weaver, longtime pharmacy dean.

== Personal life ==
The day after her retirement in 1959, she announced her engagement to Carl A. Dreves. She died in Saint Paul, Minnesota in 1978 and is buried in Acacia Park Cemetery, Mendota Heights, Minnesota.

== Writings ==
- Densford, K. J. How shall we select and prepare the undergraduate nurse? American Journal of Nursing, 32: (1932). 557–566.
- Densford, K. J. Student Health; Studies of Illness. American Journal of Nursing 35,4 (Apr. 1935) 333–336.
- Densford, K. J. The Nurse in the Community. Illinois Health Messenger 8,5 (Mar. 1, 1936) 50–52.
- Densford, K. J. Adequacy of nursing care of the patient. Hospitals 10, (1936). 83–85.
- Densford, K. J. & Everett, M. S. Ethics for Modern Nursing. Philadelphia W.B. Saunders. 1946.Densford, K.J. "Laura R. Logan." in Makers of Nursing History, ed. M. R. Pennock, 90–91. New York: Lakeside Publications, 1940.
- Densford, K. J. Nursing 1941– For All the People Hospital Management 51,2 (Feb. 1941) 49–54.
- Densford, Katharine Jane (January 1944). "Louise M. Powell, RN, BS". Alumnae Quarterly. 25 (3). School of Nursing: 3–4.
- Densford, K. J. Community participation in the U.S. Cadet Nurse Corps recruitment. American Journal of Nursing, 44: (1944). 430–431.
- Densford, K. J. To Every Army Nurse American Journal of Nursing 44,11 (Nov. 1944) 1021.
- Densford, K. J. (1945). ANA Testimony on Proposed Draft Legislation: Statement Made by Katharine J. Densford before the Senate Military Affairs Committee, March 23, 1945. The American Journal of Nursing 45(5): 383–385.
- Densford, K. J. and Millard S. Everett (Eds.). Ethics for Modern Nurses: Professional Adjustments I. Philadelphia, Pa: W.B. Saunders Company. (1946)
- Densford, K. J. Nursing at a Mid-Century Milestone International Nursing Bulletin 7,1 (Spring, 1951) 8–10.
- Densford, K. J. The Role of the University of Minnesota School of Nursing in Meeting Nursing Needs. Bulletin of University of Minnesota Hospitals and Minnesota Medical Foundation 24,31 (June 5, 1953) 625–636.
- Densford, Katherine; Grainger, Margaret (Winter 1953). "Public Affairs: The United Nations Today – A Report on Unesco". Educational Affairs. 32 (2). Phi Delta Kappa: 158–159. JSTOR 42922908.
- Densford, K. J. 1933–1952 Measuring Up in Three Score Years and Ten 1893–1963. New York: National League for Nursing. 1963.
- Dreves, K. D. This I believe about nursing in a changing world. Nursing Outlook, 12 (1964). 50–51.
