= Margaret Newman =

Margaret Newman may refer to:

- Margaret Potter (1926–1998), née Newman, British writer
- Margaret Newman (nurse) (born 1933), American nurse, university professor and nursing theorist
