= Drusilla R. Poole =

- Born: March 5, 1921; Cornersville
- Died: December 11, 1981 (aged 60); Houston
- Occupation: Nurse

Drusilla Rageu Poole (March 5, 1921 – December 11, 1981) was an American nurse and educator. She was a nursing educator in China before joining the United States Army Nurse Corps, eventually becoming director of the Walter Reed Army Institute of Nursing (WRAIN).

== Early life and education ==
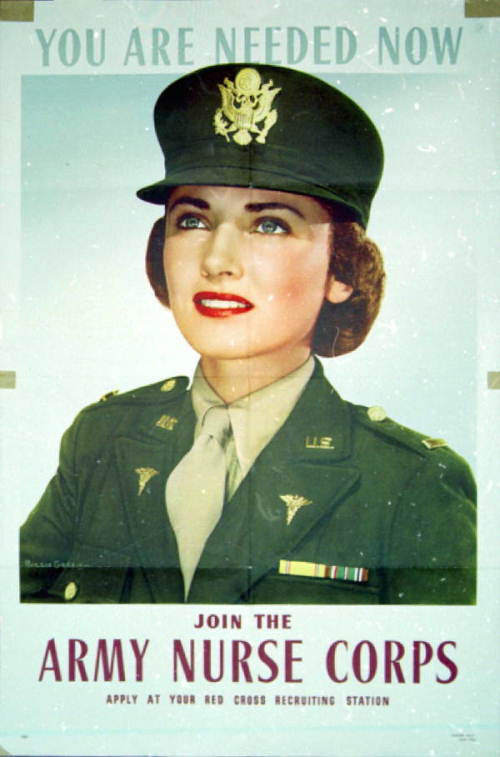
World War II Army Nurse Corps recruiting poster

Poole was born on March 5, 1921, in Cornersville, Tennessee, the daughter of John Poole, a barber. She attended Martin Junior College in Pulaski, Tennessee, then Scarritt College for Christian Workers in Nashville, where she graduated with an A.B. in 1942.

In 1944, with funding from the Cadet Nurse Corps, she began her studies at the Yale School of Nursing. After training as an advanced nurse clinician in medical-surgical nursing, she earned a master's degree from Yale in 1947.

== China ==
Poole was chosen for a four year appointment by Yale-in-China to work at the Hsiang-Ya Nursing School (now the nursing school of Central South University) in Changsha, Hunan Province, China. She studied Mandarin Chinese at the Yale Institute of Far Eastern Languages.

In 1948, she left for China aboard the SS General M. C. Meigs, accompanied by a cook stove, one hundred yards of screening, a crate of jeep parts, and a nursing mannequin dubbed "Mrs. Chase" which weighed 289 pounds and was in a 3' x' 3' x' 8' waterproof wooden box. Mrs. Chase was intended to replace a nursing mannequin brought to the school thirty years earlier by Nina Gage. Upon arrival in Hong Kong, Mrs. Chase presented a puzzle for customs officials, but eventually she was allowed to depart with Poole by train to Changsha. The nursing students were delighted with Mrs. Chase, posing for photographs with the mannequin and even dressing her in pajamas and slippers and having her act out a welcome address.

This mood did not last, however, due to the Chinese Communists. Students were drafted, supplies hard to come by, propaganda against the US intensified, and eventually, Poole was placed under house arrest in 1950. She fled in May 1950 and returned to the United States.

== U.S. Army Nurse Corps ==
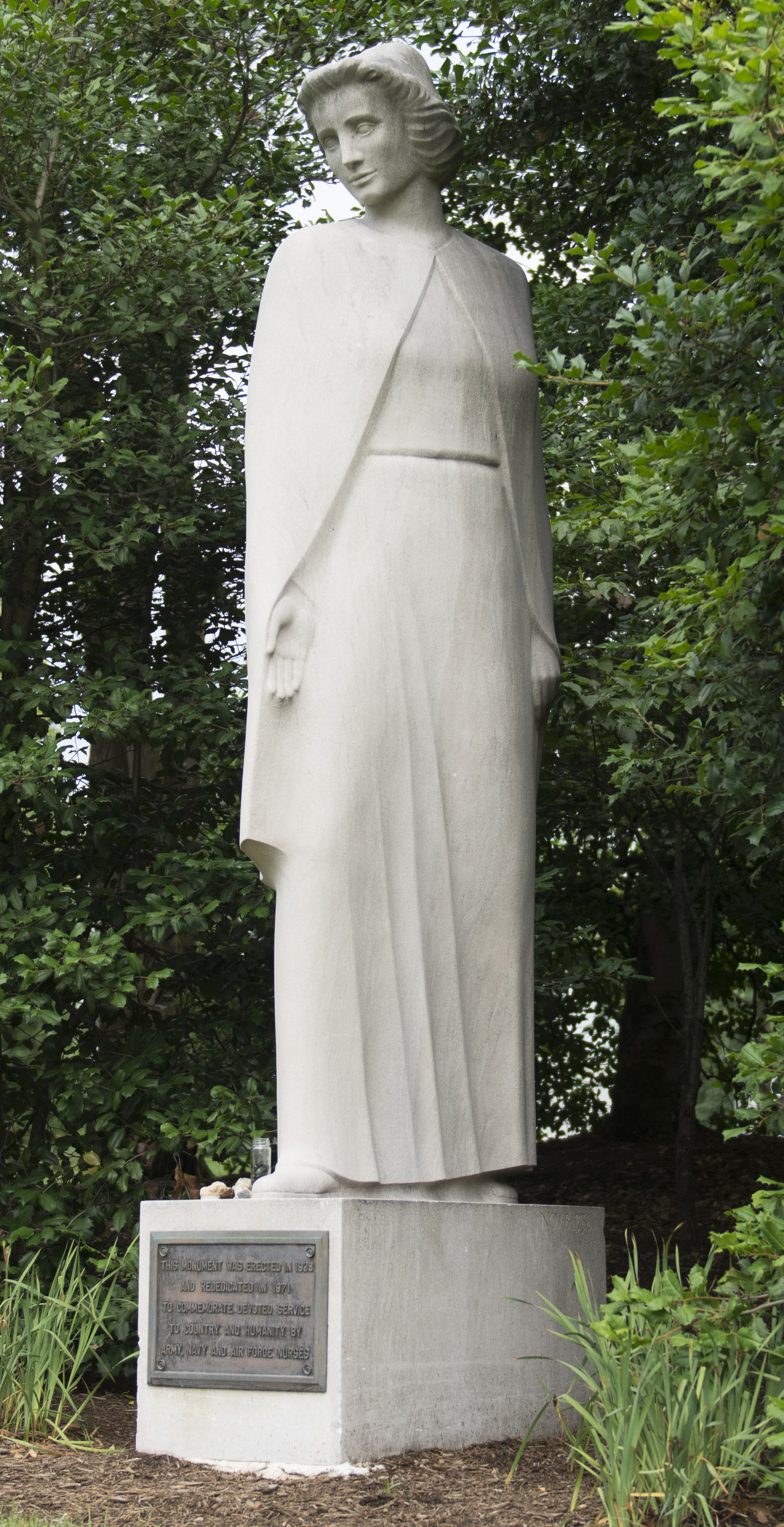
Nurses Memorial, Arlington National Cemetery

Back in the United States, Poole worked at the Grace-New Haven Hospital. In 1952, she became a clinical instructor and supervisor in surgical nursing at Burbank Hospital in Fitchburg, Massachusetts. She was then appointed director of in-service education and assistant director of nursing at Emory University Hospital in Atlanta.

In 1954, she joined the Army Nurse Corps. In 1957, Captain Poole was stationed at Walter Reed Hospital in Washington, D.C. From 1958 to 1959 she was head of the National League for Nursing Disaster Nursing Project at the University of Minnesota School of Nursing. In 1963, she returned to Asia as the Army Nurse Corps' chief nurse supervisor in Korea.

In 1969 she earned her PhD from the University of Texas at Austin. Her dissertation was A study of role perceptions of nursing faculty in sixteen state university schools of nursing in the southern region.

The same year, Colonel Poole became director of the Walter Reed Army Institute of Nursing (WRAIN). WRAIN provided full tuition to students, who graduated as first lieutenants in the U.S. Army. In 1972, Poole delivered the dedication address for the Arlington National Cemetery nurses memorial. Poole retired in 1974.

== Awards and honors ==
In 1973, Poole was awarded the Dr. Anita Newcomb McGee Award for outstanding army nursing service by the US Surgeon General and the Daughters of the American Revolution. In 1974, she was awarded the Distinguished Alumnae Award from the Yale School of Nursing.

== Death and legacy ==
Drusilla Rageu Poole died of intestinal cancer on December 11, 1981, aged 60, in Houston, Texas.
