= Alpha Tau Delta =

American nursing fraternity)

- ΑΤΔ
- Founded: February 15, 1921; 105 years ago University of California, Berkeley
- Type: Professional
- Affiliation: Independent
- Former affiliation: PFA; PPA
- Status: Active
- Emphasis: Nursing
- Scope: National
- Motto: "United in Service"
- Colors: Yellow, White, Blue, and Gold
- Symbol: Caduceus, Lamp, Star
- Flower: Yellow rose
- Jewel: Pearl
- Publication: The Pulse
- Chapters: 10 collegiate, 3 alumni
- Members: 10,000 lifetime
- Headquarters: 1904 Poinsettia Avenue; Manhattan Beach, California 90266; United States
- Website: atdnursing.org

Alpha Tau Delta (ΑΤΔ) is a professional fraternity for students and industry professionals in the nursing fields. It was founded in 1921 at University of California, Berkeley as Alpha Tau.

== History ==
=== Alpha Tau sorority ===
Nursing students at the University of California, Berkeley after holding conferences with the dean, the university faculty, and the director of the School of Nursing founded a nurses’ sorority on February 15, 1921. It was named Alpha Tau, and its first chapter was named Alpha–the Lady of the Lamp, after Florence Nightingale.

=== Alpha Tau Delta ===
Soon after, the organizing committee decided that the sorority should be designated as a fraternity since it was professional. The name was changed to Alpha Tau Delta in 1924. The Greek letter Delta was added when it was learned that a male fraternity had a prior claim to the name Alpha Tau. Alpha Tau Delta and its insignia were registered with the United States Patent Office. Alpha Tau Delta became the first nursing fraternity in the United States.

Invitations were sent to eligible collegiate Schools of Nursing throughout the states to join Alpha Tau Delta. The second chapter to be chartered was Beta, at the University of Minnesota in 1927, followed by Gamma chapter at the University of California, Los Angeles in 1928. Since new chapters were being founded on different campuses in different cities, a central office was established at Berkeley.

Its first national publication, the T.P.R. of ATD, was first published in 1931. Later, the name was changed to Cap’tions of ALPHA TAU DELTA and then to The Pulse in 2000.

ATD’s first national convention was held in 1932, in conjunction with the American Nurses Association Biennial Convention with six chapters participating. The fraternity has held a national convention each biennium from 1931 to the present time, except during World War II in 1944 or under exceptional circumstances.

In the early 1970s, Alpha Tau Delta opened its membership to male nursing students, and the Articles of Incorporation of Alpha Tau Delta were changed to reflect this decision. The fraternity became a charter member of the Professional Fraternity Association in 1978. This association was the consolidation of the Professional Panhellenic Association founded in 1925 and the Professional Interfraternity Conference founded in 1928, with the fraternity being a member of the former..

In 1992, Alpha Tau Delta replaced pledging with a membership orientation period.

As of 2024, the fraternity has ten active collegiate chapters and three alumni chapters. It has initiated 10,000 members. Its national headquarters are in Manhattan Beach, California.

== Symbols ==
Alpha Tau Delta's colors are yellow, white, blue, and gold. Its flower is the yellow rose. Its jewel is the pearl. The fraternity's motto is "United in Service". Its symbols are the caduceus, the lamp, and the star.

== Chapters ==
=== Collegiate chapters ===
In the following chapter list, active chapters are indicated in bold and inactive chapters are in italics.

| Chapters | Charter date and range | Institution | Location | Status | Ref. |
|---|---|---|---|---|---|
| Alpha | February 15, 1921 – 1946 | University of California, Berkeley | Berkeley, California | Inactive | |
| Beta | 1927–198x ? | University of Minnesota | Minneapolis and Saint Paul, Minnesota | Inactive | |
| **Gamma** | 1928 | University of California, Los Angeles | Los Angeles, California | Active | |
| Delta prime | 1928–1936 | University of Idaho | Moscow, Idaho | Inactive | |
| Zeta | 1931–1956 | University of Southern California | Los Angeles, California | Inactive | |
| Eta | 1932–xxxx ? | Oregon Health & Science University | Portland, Oregon | Inactive | |
| Delta second | 1936–xxxx ? | University of Washington | Seattle, Washington | Inactive | |
| **Theta** | 1938–xxxx ? | Duquesne University | Pittsburgh, Pennsylvania | Active | |
| Iota | 1938–xxxx ? | Marquette University | Milwaukee, Wisconsin | Inactive | |
| Kappa | 1939–xxxx ? | College of St. Scholastica | Duluth, Minnesota | Inactive | |
| Lambda | 1940–xxxx ? | Montana State University | Bozeman, Montana | Inactive | |
| Mu | 1945–xxxx ? | University of Pittsburgh | Pittsburgh, Pennsylvania | Inactive | |
| Nu | 1945–1965 | Seattle University | Seattle, Washington | Inactive | |
| Epsilon | 1953–xxxx ? | Ohio State University | Columbus, Ohio | Inactive | |
| Omicron | 1957–1965 | University of Utah | Salt Lake City, Utah | Inactive | |
| Xi | 1957–xxxx ? | Loyola University Chicago | Chicago, Illinois | Inactive | |
| Rho | 1958–xxxx ? | University of Illinois Chicago | Chicago, Illinois | Inactive | |
| Sigma | 1959–xxxx ? | University of Wisconsin–Madison | Madison, Wisconsin | Inactive | |
| Tau | 1961–xxxx ? | University of Portland | Portland, Oregon | Inactive | |
| Upsilon | May 16, 1964 – xxxx ? | Illinois Wesleyan University | Bloomington, Illinois | Inactive | |
| **Phi** | 1965 | California State University, Los Angeles | Los Angeles, California | Active | |
| Chi | 1966–xxxx ? | University of Evansville | Evansville, Indiana | Inactive | |
| Omega | 1966–xxxx ? | California State University, Long Beach | Long Beach, California | Inactive | |
| Alpha Gamma | 1976–xxxx ? | University of Wisconsin–Milwaukee | Milwaukee, Wisconsin | Inactive | |
| **Alpha Epsilon** | May 4, 2011 | University of California, Irvine | Irvine, California | Active | |
| **Alpha Theta** | | Mount Saint Mary's University, Los Angeles | Los Angeles, California | Active | |
| **Alpha Iota** | | Millikin University | Decatur, Illinois | Active | |
| **Alpha Kappa** | 2011 | Gannon University | Erie, Pennsylvania | Active | |
| **Alpha Lambda** | | Indiana University of Pennsylvania | Indiana County, Pennsylvania | Active | |
| **Alpha Omicron** | | University of Rhode Island | Kingston, Rhode Island | Active | |
| **Alpha Rho** | October 18, 2014 | San Jose State University | San Jose, California | Active | |
| **Gamma Pi** | | | Manhattan Beach, California | Active | |
| **Phi Pi** | | | Los Angeles, California | Active | |
| **Alpha Theta Pi** | | | Los Angeles, California | Active | |

=== Alumni chapters ===
Alumni chapters end in Pi. In the following chapter list, active chapters are indicated in bold and inactive chapters are in italics.

| Chapters | Charter date and range | Location | Status | Ref. |
|---|---|---|---|---|
| **Gamma Pi** | | Manhattan Beach, California | Active | |
| **Phi Pi** | | Los Angeles, California | Active | |
| **Alpha Theta Pi** | | Los Angeles, California | Active | |

== Notable members ==
- Elenora A. Cawthon, professor and university leader at Louisiana Tech.
- Katharine Jane Densford, director of the University of Minnesota School of Nursing
- Louise M. Powell, dean of nursing at Western Reserve University and director of the University of Minnesota School of Nursing

== See also ==
- List of nursing organizations
- Professional fraternities and sororities
