= Louise M. Powell =

American nurse and educator (1871–1943)

Louise M. Powell RN, BS
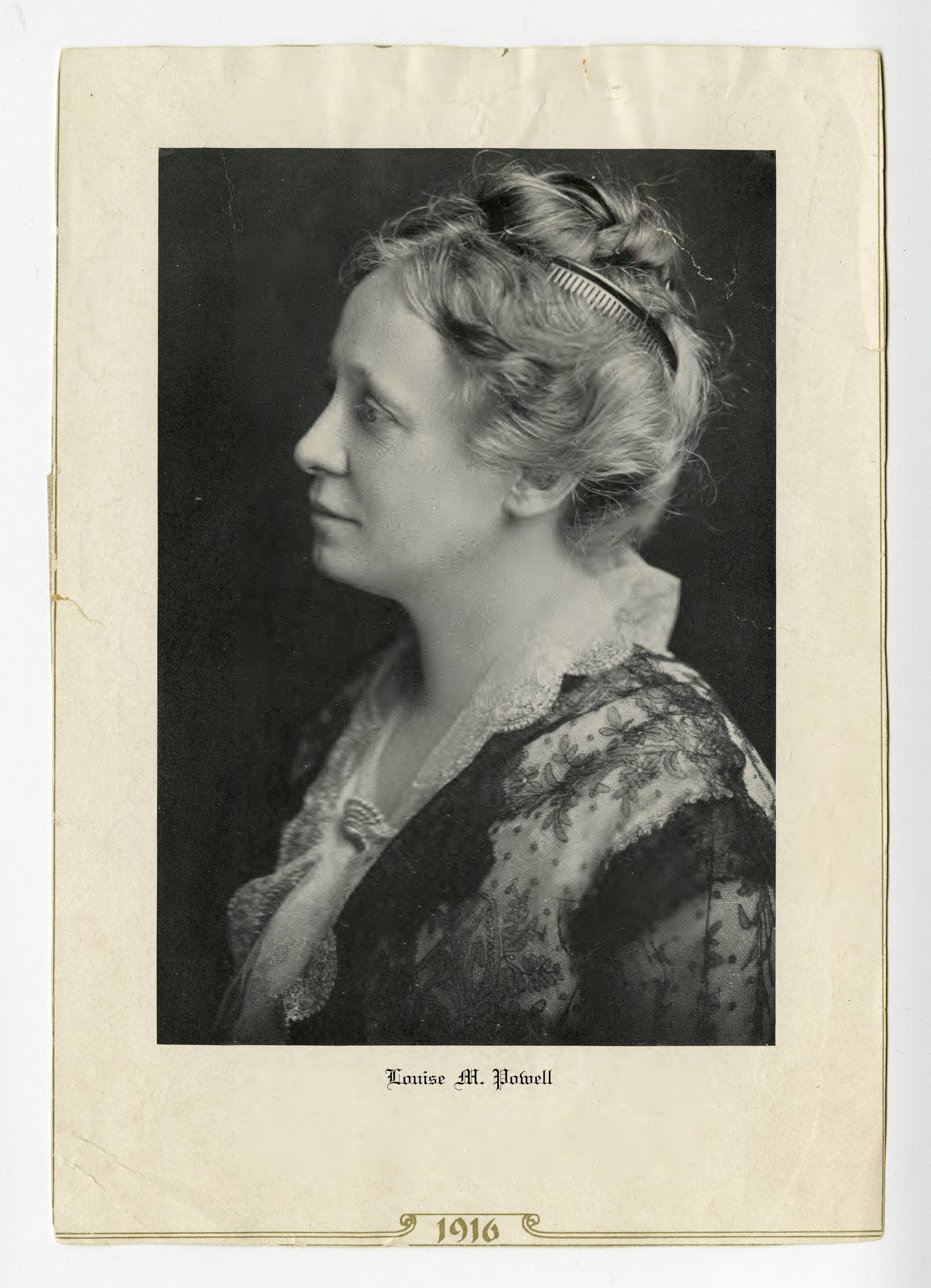
- Portrait of Louise M. Powell, 1916
- Born: Louise Matilda Powell; March 12, 1871; Staunton, Virginia
- Died: October 6, 1943 (aged 72); Staunton, Virginia
- Citizenship: USA
- Education: St. Luke’s Hospital, Richmond, Virginia; Teachers College, Columbia University; University of Virginia; Smith College, Northampton, Massachusetts
- Occupations: 1910–1921 Superintendent of Nurses of the University of Minnesota School of Nursing; 1918–1919 Acting Superintendent, University Hospital; 1922–1924 Director, School of Nursing at the University of Minnesota. 1924–1926 Dean of Nursing at Western Reserve University (which was later named Case Western Reserve University)
- Years active: 1910–1924
- Employer: University of Minnesota
- Organization: School of Nursing
- Predecessor: Bertha Erdman
- Successor: Marion L. Vannier, RN

Louise M. Powell (1871–1943) was an American nurse and educator who led the University of Minnesota School of Nursing, during its formative years. During her tenure there (1910–1924), the university established a five-year baccalaureate nursing degree program. In honor of her achievements, the nurses residence hall was named for her in 1939. She was later dean of nursing at Western Reserve University (later known as Case Western Reserve University).

== Early life ==
Louise Matilda Powell (1871–1943) was born in Staunton, Virginia in 1871 to Hugh Lee Powell and Ella Stribling Powell. Francis T. Stribling, Superintendent of the Western State Hospital, is her maternal grandfather. He developed more humane treatments for the patients at that facility. She had two siblings – one of them, her sister Lucy Lee, moved to Minneapolis also and worked at the Minneapolis Public Library for many years. Louise's initial education was in private school in Virginia and teacher training at Stuart Hall School in Staunton. She was then recruited by a former teacher to help establish a progressive school for girls, and she taught primary grades at that school in Norfolk, Virginia.

== Professional nursing career ==
Miss Powell completed nursing school at St Luke's Hospital Training School for Nurses in Richmond, Virginia in 1899. She was superintendent of nurses at St. Lukes Hospital from 1899 to 1904. Her next position from 1905 to 1908 was charge nurse of the Infirmary at Baldwin School in Bryn Mawr, Pennsylvania. Powell continued her education at the University of Virginia and at Smith College in Northampton, Massachusetts, during summer sabbaticals from her position at the University of Minnesota. (Note: Powell's continued education included courses at specialized institutions including the Hospital for Sick Children (later called Mount Wilson State Hospital), Baltimore County, Maryland and the Municipal Hospital for Contagious Diseases, Philadelphia, PA. Her coursework also included Teachers College, Diploma in Education, 1908–10; Teachers College, Second Semester, 1916–17; University of Virginia, Summer Session, 1919, Smith College, Northampton, Mass, Second Semester, 1921–1922.)

She earned a bachelor's degree at Columbia Teachers College, New York in 1922. Her class was the largest class ever enrolled at that time, with 16 students. During her first year at Columbia, she was taught by M. Adelaide Nutting, Professor of Nursing. She was a classmate of Isabel Stewart, as well as Bertha Erdmann, first Superintendent of Nurses for the new School for Nurses at the University of Minnesota. (Note: Miss Erdmann “had many interesting things to tell of the experiment in education which was being inaugurated at the University of Minnesota. The experiment was to admit young women who could meet the entrance requirements to a School of Nursing, the first such school under University control ever to be organized.”)

== University of Minnesota School of Nursing ==
After Erdmann's time leading the School for Nurses at the university was cut short due to tuberculosis, Dr. Richard Olding Beard asked Adelaide Nutting for assistance in replacing her. Nutting suggested Powell, Olding Beard made the offer and Powell accepted. Powell started her position as Superintendent of nurses at the university in July 1910.

The nursing program that she inherited had been established as a three-year program similar to that in the more advanced hospital based schools of nursing. It differed from those schools in that students were all high school graduates and they received instruction in disease and medical treatment from physicians of the university's medical school. Instruction in nursing care was originally provided only by Miss Powell, as nursing school faculty were added they provided training as well. Completely integrated into the University of Minnesota, it was also unusual in that student nurses had an eight-hour work day instead of the twelve-hour work day common at that time.

At the time that Powell accepted her position, the "hospital" consisted of 3 frame houses located on campus, two on State Street and one on University Avenue in the Stadium Village area of the Minneapolis Campus, East Bank. There was total capacity for 25 patients. The operating room was on the first floor, the recuperating rooms were upstairs. Post-op patients had to be carried upstairs by two people to their recovery bed from the operating room, as the staircases were too narrow for stretchers.

The School for Nurses had opened on March 1, 1909, and its staff consisted of one nurse and two assistants. Administration offices were situated between the door opening to the street, and the main rooms of the first floor which were the operating room, the delivery room, and a room for internes. Training was provided by the nursing school superintendent and medical school faculty. The housing provided for the nursing students was also very modest. (Note: Powell later reported conditions in the nurses’ home as ‘dismally primitive’. “Miss Powell described later how hopeful she and her students were.. ‘As they broke their way through block after block of snowdrifts, still unshoveled at the early hour when they rose .. their spirits seldom wavered, even though Minnesota’s subzero weather must often have made the pilgrimage seem like martyrdom.’ “However, we could see the walls of the hospital building rising over on the river,” Miss Powell concluded her remembrance, “and we could laugh at our inconveniences and think that they were temporary and soon there would be an elevator so that patients would not have to be carried to and from the operating room, up and down stairs, and that food and laundry could be easily transported from floor to floor”.)

Care of patients was much improved with the construction of the Elliot Memorial Hospital in 1911, which had capacity for over 100 beds. Dr. Louis Baldwin was named superintendent of the hospital-to-be in 1910. Dr. Richard Olding Beard, hired to teach at Minneapolis Hospital College in 1887, was integral in the formation of a central medical school from four existing programs, incorporated in to the University of Minnesota. Dr. Beard was an original faculty member of that University Medical School, and an energetic advocate for the professionalization of nursing.

=== Nursing curriculum and faculty ===
During her tenure at the University of Minnesota from 1910 to 1924, Miss Powell worked with Dr. Beard of the medical school and Dr. Baldwin of the University Hospital to establishing a more rigorous educational program for nurses This new five-year program put in place stronger academic standards so that graduates of the program had a strong foundation for their career. The three-year program remained available as well. The name of the school was changed from School for Nurses to School of Nursing. Some curriculum additions she achieved included Sociology (1916), Public health nursing (1918), and the five-year baccalaureate program in 1919 that included humanities coursework in addition to biological and social sciences.

In 1915 Powell added the Dental Clinic to the student's rotation; and in 1917 Powell created an affiliation with Glen Lake Tuberculosis Sanatorium in Minnetonka which had just opened a year earlier to pioneer new treatment methods. The curriculum was updated to include a two-month period of service there, introducing nursing students to another set of conditions and treatments.

Early public health nursing programs were often temporary, created in response to a particular crisis. In 1918, Powell instituted a four-month public health nursing course in cooperation with the Minnesota Public Health Association, the first of its kind in the state. The flu epidemic was a major catalyst for the course. Thirteen students attended the first course started in November 1918, six students attended the second one which started in March 1919. Among those 19 students was Pearl McIver, who went on to become director of Public Health Nursing for the U.S. Public Health Service in 1944. The course was made permanent in 1919, and was expanded to an academic year in 1920. In 1922 the course included in the curriculum of the university's Medical School, and the two programs shared it going forward.

Powell contributions to nursing education were many, including establishing admission standards, strengthening the curriculum, hiring qualified faculty, and working to improve the living conditions of the students. Simultaneously Powell was responsible for getting the housekeeping done, acting as dietician in terms of planning meals for patients and nursing staff, doing marketing for the nursing program via telephone calls, and teaching Nursing Practice classes herself. She also attended many of the lectures by doctors, and held quiz classes after the lectures

=== World War I ===
Returning from a six-month leave to further her education in 1917, Powell found the university preparing Base Hospital Unit 26 to go overseas, which went abroad in June 1918. The contingent included every head nurse from the Nursing School who was physically able to go. There was a massive need for as many trained nurses as possible, for faculty to train those nurses and space to house them during training. Additionally, Miss Powell was acting superintendent of the University of Minnesota Hospital (1918–1919) while the medical director was on military assignment. Powell also designed a four-month training program during this time to teach navy hospital corpsmen basic nursing care during the War.

The flu epidemic was a public health challenge throughout Minnesota, Elliot Hospital was emptied of regular patients and turned over entirely to flu patients, although treatment options were very limited. Most experienced staff had gone to the war effort, which left only the newest students in place to deal with this epidemic. One of those students was Pearl McIver who was later to have an extensive career in Public Health. Powell led nursing's response in dealing with the crisis, and created and taught the university's first public health course along with Dorothy Kurtzman.

=== Central School ===
The university entered into an agreement with 3 other hospitals to provide an integrated nursing training and staffing program for the whole community in 1920. The other three hospitals were The Minneapolis General Hospital, the Charles T. Miller Hospital in St. Paul, and the Northern Pacific Beneficial Association Hospital in St. Paul. Minneapolis General ended its own training program, and the recently opened Miller hospital in this way did not need to start a nursing school. Students were able to rotate among those three hospitals in addition to Glen Lake Sanitarium and community health settings, in order to gain the broadest possible variety of experience. Northern Pacific was a fraternal hospital specific to the employees and families of employees of the railroad. Elliot Hospital (the university facility) had very few maternity cases, pediatric cases, and cases of contagious disease – but those did exist at Minneapolis General. The patients at Miller included private patients, who were not seen at the university hospital.

=== Powell Hall ===
Maintenance and support of the nursing student's residence had been a challenge and a focus of energies for Powell during her tenure. At that time, nursing students were provided very modest housing with limited transportation availability, and often an absence of even basic amenities. Powell worked tirelessly to improve the housing situation for her students.

In the spring of 1931, some of the few housing buildings available for nurses were removed in favor of a new dentistry building, increasing the urgency for a nursing dormitory. An extensive outreach effort was led by alumnus Minna Kief, including a petition signed by 1,700 students and nursing alumni. The effort was joined by the Minnesota Employment commission (now known as the Minnesota Department of Employment and Economic Development) and the Minnesota State Federation of Labor, in support of the jobs that would be provided by the construction project. In The new nursing residence hall, designed by Clarence H. Johnston Sr. of St. Paul in a neo-colonial style, was completed in 1933. In 1939 for the school's thirtieth anniversary it was renamed in honor of Powell. The Louise M. Powell Hall was the first building at the University of Minnesota to be named for a living person.

Powell Hall had seven floors. Floors four, five and six were residential, each with a kitchenette for light cooking. The building was connected to the hospital by tunnel. Powell Hall was expanded in July 1945 with 125 rooms and an auditorium, to house an additional 250 U. S. Cadet Nurses. The building was the hub of activity for nursing at the university.

In 1962 Minnesota relaxed its rule requiring that nursing students live on campus, one of the first in the country to do so. As students vacated rooms, the space was put to other uses including hospital clinics and low-cost accommodations for outpatients and patients' families. The School of Nursing administration remained in the building until their new location in Weaver-Densford Hall was opened in 1980. In 1980 the chair of the hospital board of governors announced plans to build an eleven-story hospital on the site of Powell Hall. Powell Hall was demolished in 1982. The new hospital – scaled back to eight floors – opened in 1986.

=== Other activities ===
Louise Powell was named Director of Nursing at the university in 1922. inaugurated the Nurses Alumnae Association in December 1913, at that point there were 12 graduates from the school. She published the first Alumnae Association Quarterly in 1920. The Nurses Self Government Association – a student organization – was formed in 1919. Miss Powell was instrumental in establishing the Beta chapter of the nursing sorority Alpha Tau Delta in Minnesota.

Powell was active in nursing organizations including serving as president, vice president and director of the Minnesota League of Nursing Education; secretary, treasurer, and director of the Minnesota Nurses Association; member of the state and national committees of the American Red Cross; and honorary president of the Minnesota Organization for Public Health Nursing.

Powell left the University of Minnesota in 1924 to become dean at the Western Reserve University (later named Case Western Reserve University) School of Nursing in Cleveland, Ohio. The programs of the School of Nursing were in coordination with local facilities including the Babies and Children's Hospital and Lakeside Hospital which became part of University Hospitals Cleveland Medical Center, while the Lakeside Nurses Training School merged into Western Reserve University's School of Nursing also in 1924. While there she led organizational change processes to improve the classroom facilities, improve the housing facilities, increase student recruitment, and to assess quality of teaching. She also organized an Alumnae Association for the Western Reserve University School of Nursing graduates. Ill health caused her to resign from that position in March, 1927.

== Awards and honors ==
Louise Powell was the first living person to have a building named after them at the University of Minnesota.

In 1935, Miss Powell was elected honorary member of the National League of Nursing Education.

== Personal life ==
Miss Powell retired from nursing in 1926 due to health issues, and moved to Charlottesville, Virginia. During her retirement she continued with philanthropic work, learned Braille and translated books including a biology textbook for the use of the blind. She died on October 6, 1943, at her brother's home near Brownsburg, Virginia and is buried in Thornrose Cemetery in Staunton beside her mother and sister.

== Writings ==
- Powell, L.M. (1911). How the Training School for Nurses Benefits by Relation to a university. American Society of Superintendents of Training Schools for Nurses 1911 Annual Report, 150 – 158, and Proceedings of the 17th convention, Baltimore, MD: J.H. Furst, 1911.
- Powell, L.M. (1915). Existing affiliations between Universities and Training Schools. National League of Nursing Education, Annual Report, 106 – 14, and Proceedings of the 21st convention, Baltimore, MD: Williams & Wilkins, 1915.
- Powell, L.M. (1920). Department of Nursing Education: Student self-government in Schools of Nursing. American Journal of Nursing 20 (3), 471–8.
- Powell, L.M. (1921). Education in tuberculosis for student nurses. American Journal of Nursing, 22 (11), 98 – 102.
- Powell, L.M. (1937). The history of the development of nursing education at the University of Minnesota. University of Minnesota School of Nursing Alumnae Quarterly 17 (1), 4 – 13. Reprinted in Brenda Canedy, Remembering Things Past: A heritage of excellence; University of Minnesota School of Nursing Diamond Jubilee (Minneapolis: University of Minnesota Biomedical Graphic Communication, 1984), 1.
