= Margaret Arnstein =

American nurse and public health researcher (1904–1972)

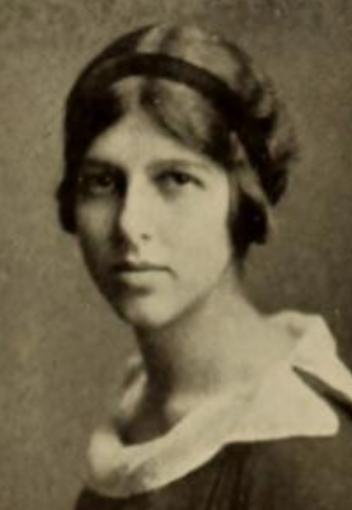
- Margaret Arnstein, from the 1925 Smith College yearbook
- Born: October 27, 1904
- Died: October 9, 1972 (aged 67)

Margaret G. Arnstein (October 27, 1904 – October 9, 1972) was an American health expert who focused her efforts in nursing and public health. Throughout her life Arnstein worked for the United States public health sector and several American colleges, eventually becoming dean of the Yale School of Nursing in 1967. Arnstein also published multiple academic papers discussing nursing practices within the U.S health system of the time. Arnstein also participated in Congress discussions in relation to provisions given to the health sector by the state through the Second Supplemental Appropriation Bill of 1957. In her later career Margaret earned the nickname of "Peg" by her peers.

== Early life and studies ==
Arnstein was born in New York on October 27, 1904, to Elsie and Leo Arnstein. Arnstein's father Leo was a mildly well-known business man within the community and good friend of Lillian Wald. Arnstein's interactions with Wald grew more common as her father Leo was on the board of directors for Wald's Henry Street settlement house.

Arnstein had a long and dedicated academic career as a student, graduating from the Ethical Culture School in 1921 before starting her higher education at Smith College, graduating in 1925 with a Bachelor of Arts. Arnstein moved on to study nursing at the New York City Presbyterian Hospital's School of Nursing where she received her diploma of nursing in 1928. Arnstein continued to pursue academic qualifications with a Masters of Arts specializing in Public Health Nursing from the Teachers College, Columbia University in 1929 before working shortly in the private health sector and then again returning to complete a Masters of Public Health with the Johns Hopkins University in 1934.

Despite not completing further study towards a degree with a college or university after 1934, Arnstein received three honorary Bachelors of Science. Smith College, 1950; Wayne State University, 1962 and finally the University of Michigan in 1972.

== Career ==
Arnstein's working career began in 1929 when she started work as a nurse at the Westchester County Hospital in White Plains, New York. Through this time Arnstein was eventually promoted to supervisor but soon left to complete studies in order to become a public health nurse.

After completing her studies at Johns Hopkins University Arnstein moved back to New York and began work as a consultant nurse within the New York Communicable Disease Division. After working for the public sector for three years she accepted a job offer from the University of Minnesota to develop their nursing program. While at the University of Minnesota, Arnstein directed the university's nursing course alongside being a professor for health and nursing within the Department of Preventive Medicine.

Arnstein worked within the US public health system beginning in 1940 with her public career finishing in 1966. She took on many roles over her time within the public health system, beginning work as a consultant nurse to the Department of Health. As World War II continued, Arnstein eventually worked for the United Nations from 1943 until the close of the war in 1945. Her role during this period was as chief nurse for Relief and Rehabilitation Administration the UN had set up within the Balkans. As Arnstein's role for the UN finished up she moved to Washington, D.C., after being offered the position as assistant to the chief of the Bureau of Medical Services' Nursing Division. Arnstein continued to work for the Bureau of Medical Service and was eventually promoted to chief of nursing resources in 1949 until 1957 when she became Chief of Public Health Nursing again for the Bureau of Medical Services. In the following year Arnstein took a year's leave from her post to teach for Yale's School of Nursing. Upon returning, she resumed serving as Chief of Public Health Nursing up until 1960 when the Bureau decided to merge both sectors into the Division of Nursing. In September 1960, Arnstein was appointed the inaugural Chief of the new division and held the position until 1964 when she moved to the Office of International Health.

While working for the International Health division, Arnstein was funded by the Rockefeller Foundation and the U.S Agency for International Development to study the health systems of developing countries in order to determine what changes they needed to succeed. From 1964 to 1966 Arnstein worked on seven different Rockefeller research projects with involvement in Ethiopia, Guatemala, Hawaii, Jamaica, Thailand and two joint investigations in Senegal/Nigeria and Nairobi/Sudan. She conducted some of her research in-field for all of these reports except the one based on Hawaii.

Arnstein ended her public health career in 1966 and began teaching as a professor at the University of Michigan from October 1966 until August 19, 1967, when she moved and became the Dean of Nursing at Yale later that year.

In 1957 Arnstein directed the first international seminar in nursing research which was held in France by the Nightingale Foundation.

== Publications and research ==
Arnstein directed and published multiple papers based on the public health sector within the U.S. In 1953 she published the Guide for National Studies of Nursing Resources for the World Health Organization. She also directed the Division of Nursing Resources' 1956 "Design for Statewide Nursing Surveys: A basis for action" along with directing the Public Health Service's "Public Health Service Publication, Issue 227", also titled "The Head Nurse Looks at Her Job", published in 1953.

== Accomplishments ==
In 1955 the Lasker Foundation jointly awarded the Mary Woodland Lasker Public Service Award to Arnstein along with the US Nursing Services, Lucile Perty Leone and Pearl McIver.

Arnstein became the first woman to receive the Rockefeller Public Service Award in 1965.

In 1971 Arnstein became the fifth woman to win the Sedgwick Memorial Medal.

== Legacy ==
As of 1995, the American Public Health Association has awarded a total of eight Margaret G. Arnstein awards.

Since 2002, the Yale School of Nursing has had an exhibition dedicated to Arnstein on display.

== Works ==
- Petry, Lucile; Arnstein, Margaret; McIver, Pearl (1952). "Research for Improved Nursing Practices". Public Health Reports. 67 (2): 183–188. doi:10.2307/4588035. JSTOR 4588035. PMC 2030693. PMID 14900352.
