= Joanne Disch =

- Citizenship: American
- Education: University of Wisconsin-Madison; University of Alabama at Birmingham; University of Michigan
- Known for: Health administration, Patient safety
- Awards: Distinguished Alumni Award, University of Michigan; Fellow AAN
- Scientific career
- Fields: Nursing
- Workplaces: University of Minnesota
- Thesis: (1985)
- Website: www.linkedin.com/in/joanne-disch-rn-phd-faan-45409a7b/

Joanne Disch is an American professor ad honorem of nursing at University of Minnesota School of Nursing. She is best known for her contributions improving patient safety, health administration, and nurse-physician relationships.

As an advocate for patient safety, Disch has testified before Congress sharing both large-scale data and compelling case studies.

== Education ==
Disch earned her BS in nursing at the University of Wisconsin–Madison in 1968, in 1976, she earned an MS in nursing at University of Alabama at Birmingham, and her doctorate in 1985 from University of Michigan.

== Career ==
She started her career as a staff nurse in cardiovascular intensive care and she has served as a chief nurse executive in two major medical centers. She has co-authored the award-winning text "Person and Family Centered Care".

Disch was named as the Katherine R. and C. Walton Lillehei Chair in Nursing Leadership in 2000 at the University of Minnesota School of Nursing. In 2000–2012, Disch was the director of the University of Minnesota's Densford International Center for Nursing Leadership, part of the School of Nursing.

Disch is a Fellow of the American Academy of Nursing, an organization for which she served as president from 2011 to 2013. In 2018, she was named a Living Legend, nursing's highest honor. She has also served as president of the American Association of Critical-Care Nurses and as board member and chair of the national board of AARP where she led organization through a major restructuring.

In 2016, Disch was elected chair of the board of directors of Aurora Health Care, a not for profit health-care system headquartered in Milwaukee. In 2018, Disch was elected chair of the board of directors after the merger of Aurora Health Care and Advocate Healthcare, the largest healthcare provider in Illinois. The joint healthcare system is the 10th largest in the United States. In September 2019, she was succeeded by John Daniels Jr. as chair of Advocate Aurora board.

Currently, Disch serves as chair of the Chamberlain University Board of Trustees.

== Awards ==
- President's Award from the American Academy of Nursing
- Marguerite Rodgers Kinney Award for a Distinguished Career from the American Association of Critical-Care Nurses
- Distinguished Alumna Award from the University of Wisconsin, Madison
- Distinguished Alumna awards from the University of Alabama at Birmingham, and the University of Michigan.
- "Living Legend" by the American Academy of Nursing
