= Sylvanus Stockwell =

American politician (1857–1943)

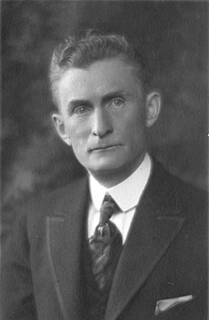
- Stockwell in 1925
- Born: June 8, 1857; Anoka, Minnesota
- Died: April 17, 1943 (aged 85); Minneapolis, Minnesota
- Political party: Farmer-Labor Party
- Other political affiliations: Democrat, Populist (Prior to 1922)
- Spouse: Maud Conkry (m. 1887)
- Children: 3

Sylvanus Albert Stockwell (June 8, 1857 - April 17, 1943) was an American Georgist politician active in Minnesota.

Stockwell was born on June 8, 1857, in Anoka, Minnesota. In 1880, he moved in Minneapolis where he would live for the rest of his life.

He and his wife were both lifelong Georgists. In 1891, he joined Carl J. Buell in an attempt to petition the State of Minnesota to incorporate Georgist single-tax policy into the State Constitution.

== Political career ==
Stockwell initially ran as a Democrat in 1890. The first two times he would be in office in the Minnesota House of Representatives, he would represent District 33 from 1891 to 1892. In 1891, he introduced a bill to allow women to vote in municipal elections. It was 'indefinitely postponed'. In 1896, he was elected as on a Fusion Democratic-Populist Ticket, serving again from 1897 to 1898. In 1897, he introduced a bill to abolish capital punishment, which was voted down after a twenty-three hour debate. He represented Senate District 42 from 1899 to 1902. In 1899, he introduced a bill that would allow local governments to implement single-tax systems, which was defeated.

In 1900, he ran for Minnesota's 5th congressional district against incumbent Loren Fletcher, losing with 34.3% of the vote.

In 1904, he helped found the Minneapolis Voters League, to increase election education and turnout. In 1906, Stockwell founded the Municipal Ownership League of Minneapolis (MOLoM). The MOLoM advocated for city control of the Gas Power Company. Governor John Albert Johnson encouraged them, and expanded their goals to city control over railroads, telephones, and electricity.

He then represented District 32 twice, from 1923 to 1926 and again from 1929 to 1940.

In 1929, Frances Mchie Rains was denied admission to the University of Minnesota School of Nursing on a basis of her race. Rains brought the issue to Stockwell, who then convinced the state legislature to grant her entry and ban racial discrimination in University admittance.

He was also an early environmentalist, leading efforts to clean up pollution in Bde Maka Ska. He also led infrastructure improvements and the creation and improvement of public parks around Lake Nokomis and Minnehaha Creek. In 1933, he introduced bills that would create thirteen state forests, and the first permanent protections for the Boundary Waters.

== Death and Legacy ==
Stockwell would die April 17, 1943, at the age of 85. He would be credited as an inspiration for Donald M. Fraser and Paul Wellstone.
