= Irene Clark Woodman =

American military nurse (1915–1994)

Mildred Irene Clark Woodman
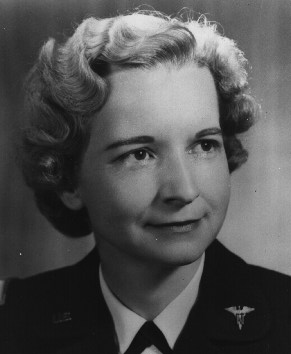
- Col. Mildred Irene Clark Woodman, 12th Chief, Army Nurse Corps
- Born: January 30, 1915
- Died: November 25, 1994 (aged 79)
- Military career
- Allegiance: United States of America
- Branch: United States Army
- Service years: 1938–1967
- Awards: Army Commendation Medal, Distinguished Service Medal

Mildred Irene Clark Woodman (January 30, 1915 – November 25, 1994) was the twelfth chief of the United States Army Nurse Corps (1963–1967). She is credited with, during her tenure, playing a large role in the survival of the Nurse Corps in the Vietnam War. She has been inducted into the Michigan Women's Hall of Fame.

== Biography ==
Woodman was born on January 30, 1915, to Martha Darling and William James Clark, in Elkton, North Carolina. The youngest of five children, she attended and graduated the Baker Sanatorium Training School for Nurses in Lumberton, North Carolina. In 1936, Clark attended two six-month postgraduate courses. The first was a curriculum in pediatrics offered by the Babies Hospital in Wrightsville Beach, North Carolina. The second was a program at the Jewish Hospital in Philadelphia, Pennsylvania, that prepared specialists in operating room administration and technique. Elizabeth Pearson, one of Clark's postgraduate instructors, had served in the Army Nurse Corps (ANC), and initially sparked Clark's interest in the ANC. When Clark was accepted, she was first assigned to Fort Bragg. After taking several courses to become an experienced Anesthesiologist, in 1938, Woodman was reassigned to Fort Leavenworth, and commissioned as a second lieutenant; she was later assigned to Schofield Barracks. While there, she tended to the wounded after the attack on Pearl Harbor. In 1943, Woodman became chief nurse at Auburn General Hospital, Brooke General Hospital, Cushing General Hospital, Halloran General Hospital, Station Hospital, and the 382nd Station Hospital. She received her B.S. in nursing education from the University of Minnesota School of Nursing.

Woodman served as chief nurse of the XXIV Corps. She was the only woman staff officer (as chief nurse of the Far East Command) assigned to General Douglas MacArthur when the Korean War began. Later she served as Director of Nurses and Medical Specialists in Office of the Surgeon General, during which she implemented the Army Student Nurse Program. Woodman became Chief Army Nurse in 1963.

She worked throughout the Vietnam era to increase the minimum educational requirements for army nurses.

For her work, she received the Army Commendation Medal with Pendant, and the Distinguished Service Medal. When Woodman died, she was buried in Arlington National Cemetery. The Clark Health Clinic is named after her.
