= Pearl McIver =

American nurse and public official

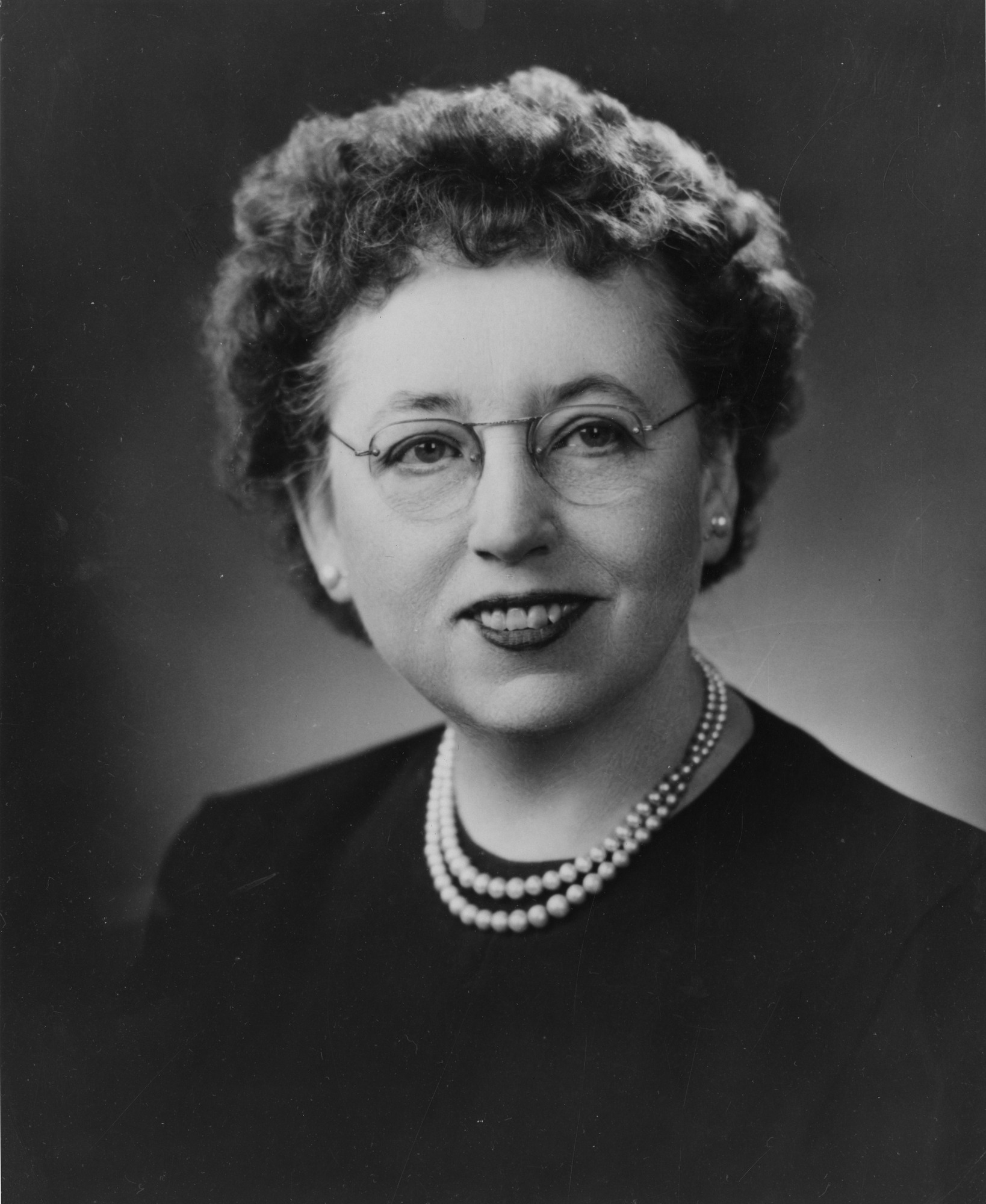
- McIver in 1955
- Born: Pearl McIver; June 23, 1893; Lowry, Minnesota, U.S.
- Died: June 3, 1976 (aged 82); Saint Paul, Minnesota, U.S.
- Education: University of Minnesota School of Nursing
- Occupations: Nurse, public official
- Years active: 1918–1957
- Employer: United States Public Health Service
- Organization: United States Public Health Service

Pearl McIver (June 23, 1893 – June 3, 1976) was an American nurse and public official. She was noted for her work with the United States Public Health Service (USPHS) and was the first nurse to be employed by the body in providing consultation services on nursing administration. McIver later served with various health organizations, and retired in 1957 after being the USPHS' Chief of the Division of Public Health Nursing. She was inducted into the American Nurses Association Hall of Fame in 2014.

== Biography ==
=== Early life ===
McIver was born on June 23, 1893, in Lowry, Minnesota. She was the daughter of a Scottish immigrant father and her mother, from Minnesota, was of Norwegian descent. She began her career as a school teacher in North Dakota.

=== Education ===
McIver attended the University of Minnesota's School of Nursing. She nursed children during the 1918 flu pandemic, and cared for them by removing her mask and cap. McIver then wrapped the child in cloth and rocked them in her arms until they calmed down and consumed fluids. She graduated from the school in 1919, and remained at the university to work in the hospital for the next three years. McIver later obtained Bachelor of Science and Master of Arts degrees in administration from Teachers College, Columbia University.

=== Public health ===
McIver was one of the first students to attend the initial training program in Public Health at the University of Minnesota in 1919, taught by Louise Powell. It was established in cooperation with the Minnesota Public Health Association, the first of its kind in the state.

McIver was also the director of public health nursing in the Missouri State Health Department.

In 1933, she was employed by the United States Public Health Service (USPHS) in their Division of Public Health, as the first US Public Health Nurse. She worked as a public health nursing analyst to concentrate on the national health needs of the people. The USPHS hired other nurses to help McIver in providing consultation to all states regarding issues relating to nursing. She was the first nurse to be employed by the USPHS to provide consultation on nursing administration. McIver was convinced that the strengths of each individual director of public health nursing of each state would influence its scope and quality. Her goal was to have an experienced nursing director in the health department of every state. She later continued with the service by working in their Division of Domestic Quarantine. McIver worked closely with the Director of Nursing in the U.S. Children's Bureau, Naomi Deutsch, to support community nursing services in a coordinated way.

In 1944 McIver was made chief of public health nurses. McIver had the honor of administering the oath to the Minnesota Nursing Cadet Corps members at their induction in May, 1944 at Northrop Auditorium in Minneapolis.

McIver was the chief of the Nursing Unit of the Children’s Bureau, and was responsible for training and assigning public health nurseries to various departments in the health sector. After serving as the USPHS Chief of the Division of Public Health Nursing, she retired in 1957, after 22 years of service.

=== Post-retirement ===
She also worked with the American Nurses Association (ANA) for nearly 20 years, and was its president between 1948 and 1950. McIver was the editor of the American Journal of Nursing and served as the Vice-President of the American Public Health Association where she oversaw the foundation of the organization's nursing section. She was the chairperson of the Federal Nursing Council, was a member of the Expert Panel of Nursing for the World Health Organization, was the chairperson of the International Council of Nurses Constitution Committee, and was the Vice-Chairperson of the American Nurses Foundation.

=== Personal life ===
McIver died on June 3, 1976, at the age of 83.

== Legacy ==
McIver helped to influence a greater than 40% increase in employment in the local public health sectors of each state. She received the Outstanding Achievement Award from the University of Minnesota in 1951.

In 1955 the Lasker Foundation jointly awarded the Mary Woodland Lasker Public Service Award to McIver along with Margaret Arnstein and Lucile Petry Leone.

The inaugural Public Health Nurse Award was awarded to McIver by the Public Health Nurses Section of the ANA in 1956, which was later renamed in her honor.

She was awarded the Florence Nightingale Medal by the American Red Cross on May 8, 1961. McIver was inducted into the American Nurses Association Hall of Fame in 2014.

== Works ==
- Missouri., & McIver, P. (1931). Annual report of public health nursing, 1931. Jefferson City: State Board of Health of Missouri.
- McIver, P. (1934). An analysis of first level public health nursing in ten selected health organizations. New York, N.Y.: National Organization for Public Health Nursing.
- McIver, P. (1937). Public health nursing. Washington: U.S. Govt. Print. Off.
- McIver, P. (1942). Registered nurses in the U.S.A.
- McIver, P. (1943). Public health nursing. Washington: U.S. Govt. Print. Off.
- McIver, P. (1943). Negro nurses and the war effort. Mabel K. Staupers Papers, Moorland-Spingarn Research Center, Howard University, Washington, D.C. (box 96-2)
- Petry, Lucile, Margaret Arnstein, and Pearl McIver. "Research for Improved Nursing Practices." Public Health Reports 67, no. 2 (1952): 183-88. Accessed May 11, 2021. doi:10.2307/4588035.
