= Lucile Petry Leone =

Lucile Petry Leone MA, RN
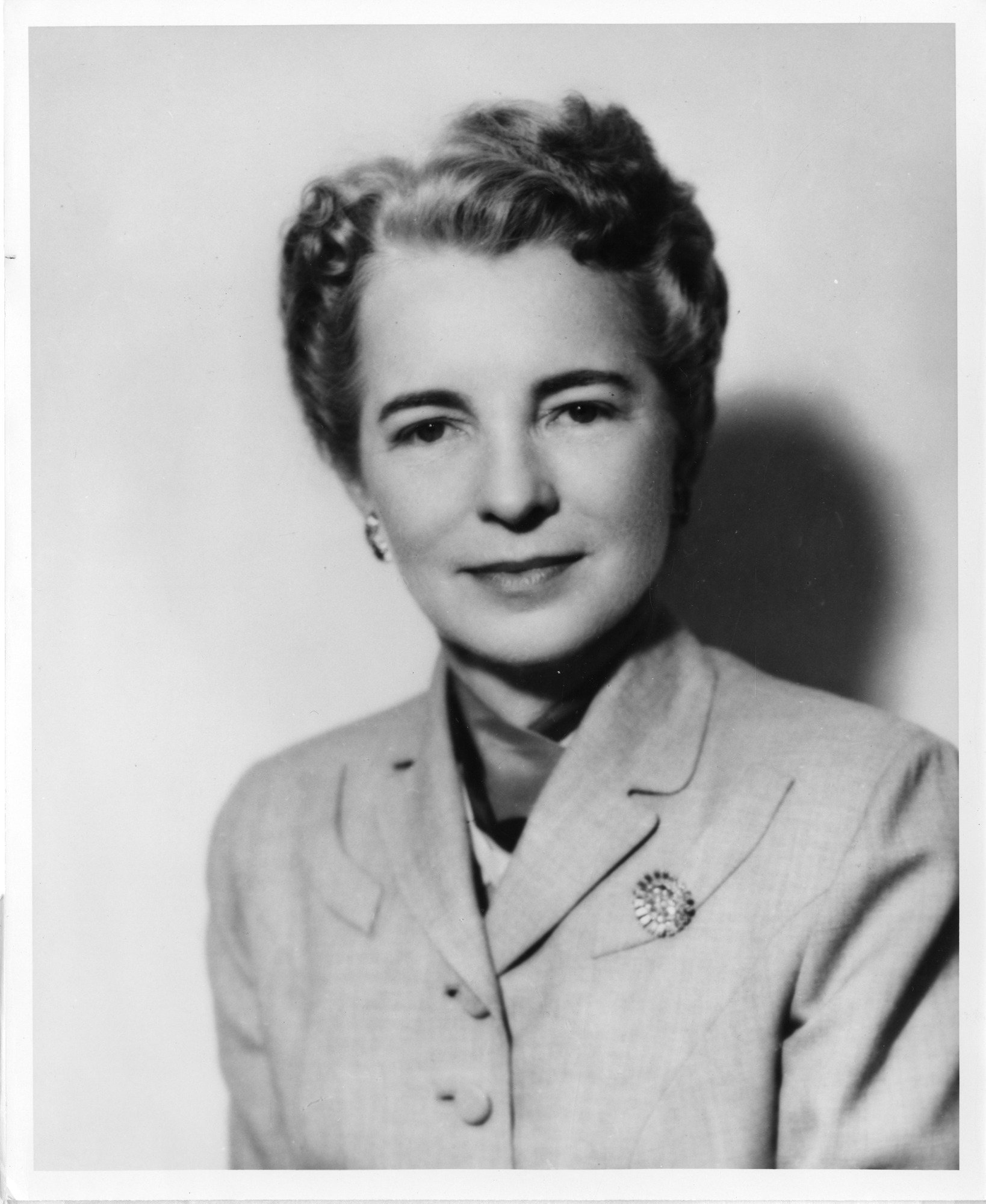
- Petry in 1955
- Born: Lucile Petry; January 2, 1902; Frog Heaven, Preble County, Ohio
- Died: November 25, 1999 (aged 97); San Francisco
- Citizenship: USA
- Education: University of Delaware, Johns Hopkins School of Nursing, Columbia Teachers College
- Occupation: 1941-1966 Public Health Nurse
- Years active: 1929-1966
- Organization(s): Cadet Nurse Corps, United States Public Health Service, University of Minnesota, Texas Women's University
- Known for: Founding director of the Cadet Nurse Corps
- Title: Assistant Surgeon General of the United States Public Health Service
- Spouse: Nicholas C. Leone
- Awards: Florence Nightingale Medal; Mary Woodland Lasker Public Service Award

Lucile Petry Leone (January 23, 1902 – November 25, 1999) was an American nurse who was the founding director of the Cadet Nurse Corps in 1943. Because the Nurse Corps met its recruiting quotas, it was not necessary for the US to draft nurses in World War II. She was the first woman and the first nurse to be appointed as Assistant Surgeon General of the United States Public Health Service.

== Origins ==
Born in 1902 in Frog Heaven, Ohio, Lucile was the only child of a high school principal and his wife. She was raised in Selbyville, Delaware.

Lucile Petry completed a double major in chemistry and English at the University of Delaware in 1924. While attending the University of Delaware she worked as a nurses' assistant over the summer, confirming her interest in nursing. "I knew I wanted to work with both my hands and my head," Petry said. "I wanted to see science work. And I knew I wanted to work with people, not things."

She earned a nursing degree from Johns Hopkins School of Nursing in 1927 in one and a half years, and during that time she held six different nursing positions. She served as head nurse, night supervisor, and in several wards including a psychiatric ward at Phipps Clinic. She earned a master's degree from Teachers College, Columbia University in 1929 on scholarship."

== University of Minnesota School of Nursing ==
Petry's first position after earning her M.A. was assistant supervisor of clinical instruction at Yale for a summer. Then Petry was hired to be one of two instructors at the University of Minnesota School of Nursing in 1929. Her initial role was to coordinate and update instruction and curriculum in the nursing school.

She spent the next eleven years teaching nursing students and recruiting faculty and students to the school under the directorship of Katharine Jane Densford. She took one year during that period to earn her doctorate degree at Columbia Teachers College. Her role expanded to Associate Professor and Assistant Dean for the 1937–1938 academic year, while Densford took a sabbatical leave to work with the International Council of Nurses in London. Petry attended the convention of the National League of Nursing Education in April, 1938. Petry was instrumental in laying the academic foundations for nursing education and the preparation for teachers and administrators.

== World War II ==
From 1941 until 1966 Leone worked at the United States Public Health Service. Initially she was 'on loan' to the US Public Health Service as an educational consultant, with the directive to accelerate nursing education nationally in the U.S. By 1943 various groups were organizing to provide for additional training for wartime nurses, including an effort by the American Legion Auxiliary to fund a 'Victory Nurse Corps'. Then in June, 1943 Petry became the founding director of the Cadet Nurse Corps.

Congress created the Cadet Nurse Corps via the Bolton Nurse Training Act, which provided federal funds for housing and training costs of educating nurses.

The cost of a student's tuition, fees, room, and board as well as a monthly stipend would be paid. Nursing schools were required to submit information and follow guidelines in order to participate, but there was minimal federal supervision of the curriculum. The training itself was not standardized. From July 1943 to October 1945, about 132,000 women were admitted to colleges across the country under the act. In exchange for federal funding, participating colleges were required to establish a 24- to 30-month accelerated education program for nurse candidates. And the women who enrolled had to pledge to "engage in essential nursing, military or civilian, for the duration of the war."

In return for that pledge, the government paid all tuition fees and a monthly stipend that ranged from $15 to $30, depending on the seniority of the nurse candidate, and supplied distinctive uniforms by fashion designer Molly Parnis.

In California, several hospitals took the lead in recruiting and training nurses for the Corps. These included Good Samaritan, Queen of Angels Hospital and St. Vincent's in Los Angeles and Huntington Memorial in Pasadena. After the war, those activities continued to be beneficial as those hospitals offered employment positions to nurses, breaking the contractor pattern that had been in place.

In May, 1944 in Washington, D.C. there was a joint ceremony marking the observance of the second annual national induction of the Cadet Nurse Corps. Thomas Parran, Surgeon General of the Public Health Service, led the 112,000 cadet nurses in the induction pledge, Petry gave remarks, and others including Eleanor Roosevelt, Frances Bolton, Helen Hayes and Bing Crosby paid tribute to them. The Freedman's Hospital (later known as Howard University Hospital) joined with other schools of nursing in the District of Columbia and Alexandria, Virginia in a joint ceremony on Constitution Avenue, joined by the Cadet Nurse Glee Club. The ceremony was broadcast coast-to-coast on the Mutual Broadcasting network by the Public Health Service, Federal Security Agency.

On graduation, the cadet nurse had received a complete nursing education, and was eligible to become a registered nurse.

The program was a success, training 124,000 nurse cadets in basic schools, making it unnecessary to draft nurses for war service.

== Post War Period ==
Petry was the chief nurse officer for the U.S. Public Health Service after the end of World War II. In June 1949, Petry became the first nurse and the first woman to be promoted to assistant surgeon general of the U.S. Public Health Service. Simultaneously she was also an associate chief of the agency's Bureau of Medical Services. At that point she was ranked the equivalent of a brigadier general in the health service.

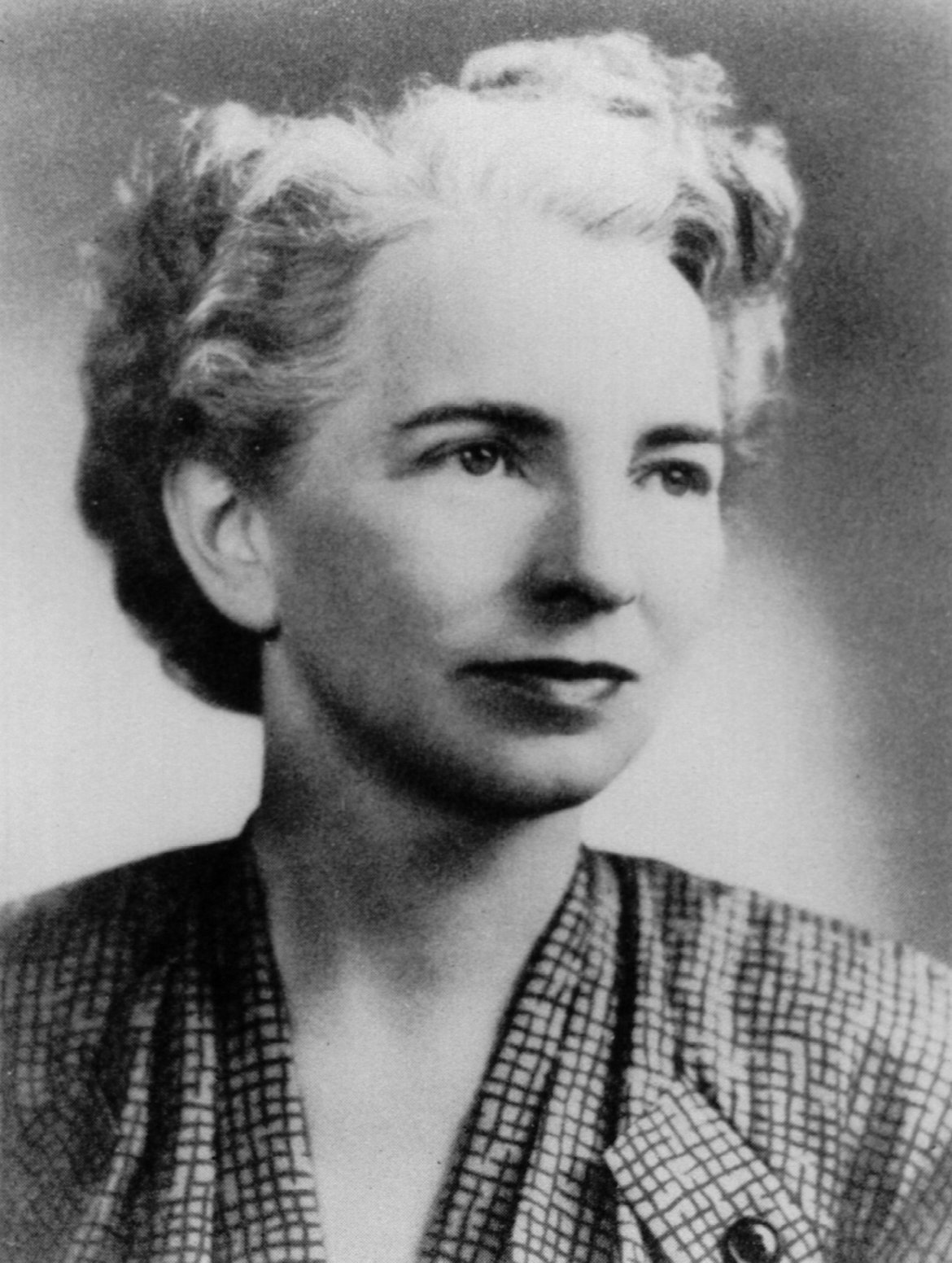
Lucile Petry Leone in 1951

On Petry's recommendation, the Division of Nursing Services of the Public Health Service launched a research grant and fellowship program. From those programs grew the National Center for Nursing Research and the National Institute for Nursing Research.

During the 1950s she was a member of the nursing advisory committee of the W. K. Kellogg Foundation. During the 1960s, she served as President of the National League for Nursing.

Leone participated in the first assembly of the World Health Organization as a delegate in 1948. In 1956 she was a delegate again, to the ninth assembly.

When she retired from government service in 1966, Lucile P. Leone was the Assistant Surgeon General and Chief Nurse Officer. After retiring, she continued her career in nursing education, serving as Assistant Dean and teacher of nursing at Texas Woman's University until 1971.

== Personal life ==
She married Nicholas C. Leone in 1952. They divorced in 1967. She died on November 25, 1999, at the age of 97 in San Francisco, California.

== Awards ==
Leone received the Florence Nightingale Medal of the International Red Cross and the Distinguished Service Award of the United States Public Health Service. She was named by the University of Maryland School of Nursing "as one of seven who significantly impacted the nursing profession." She was elected a member of the Institute of Medicine in 1970.

In 1955 the Lasker Foundation jointly awarded the Mary Woodland Lasker Public Service Award to Leone along with Margaret Arnstein and Pearl McIver.

Petry was awarded honorary degrees from Syracuse University, Adelphia College, Wagner College and Hood College.

The Lucile Petry Leone Award was established by 2,500 members of the Public Health Service to honor Leone upon her retirement, and to encourage nursing leadership. It is presented biennially by the National League for Nursing "to an outstanding nurse educator."

== Works ==
- Petry, L. (1946). Foreword. In Katherine J. Densford and Millard S. Everett (Eds.). Ethics for Modern Nurses: Professional Adjustments I. Philadelphia, Pa: W.B. Saunders Company.
- Petry, Lucile, Margaret Arnstein, and Pearl McIver. "Research for Improved Nursing Practices." Public Health Reports 67, no. 2 (1952): 183–88. Accessed May 11, 2021. doi:10.2307/4588035.
- Leone, Lucile Petry, and Helen L. Johnston (1954). "Agricultural migrants and public health". Public Health Rep. 69 (1): 1–8. PMC 2024329. PMID 13121189.
- Leone, L.P. (1953). "National nursing needs – a challenge to education". Nursing Outlook. 1 (11): 616–619. PMID 13145117.
- Leone, Lucile Petry (1953). "The Community's Stake in the Professional Education of Health Workers". American Journal of Nursing. 53 (10): 1215–1216. PMID 13092139.
- Leone, Lucile (1955). "The Art of Nursing". Journal of the American Medical Association. 157 (16): 1381–1383. doi:10.1001/jama.1955.02950330021005. PMID 14366988.
- Leone, Lucile P. “The Changing Needs of People”, American Journal of Public Health 47, no. 1 (January 1, 1957): pp. 32–38.
- Leone, Lucile P. Statewide Planning for Nursing Education. Atlanta: Southern Regional Education Board, 1967.
- Leone, Lucile Petry (1988). "Lucile Petry Leone". In Schorr, Thelma M.; Zimmerman, Anne (eds.). Making Choices, Taking Chances: Nurse Leaders Tell Their Stories. St. Louis, Missouri: The C. V. Mosby Company. ISBN 0801646111.
