= Frances Rains =

African American community worker, educator, businesswoman, and nurse (1911-2006)

Frances Mary McHie Rains
- Born: Frances Mary McHie; January 29, 1911; Minneapolis
- Died: May 21, 2006 (aged 95); Long Beach, California
- Occupations: Nurse, Educator

Frances Mary McHie Rains (1911–2006) was an American nurse. She was the first Black woman admitted to the University of Minnesota School of Nursing. She was admitted to the School of Nursing after the Minnesota State Legislature learned of her initial rejection from the school based on race. She graduated in 1932.

== Biography ==
Rains née McHie was born on January 29, 1911, in Minneapolis, Minnesota. In 1929, she was denied admittance to the University of Minnesota School of Nursing. After contacting state representative Sylvanus Stockwell, the legislature was convinced to grant her admittance and ban racial discrimination in college admittance. In 1932 she graduated from The University of Minnesota School of Nursing. She had to fight for her right to attend school there after initially being denied admittance. While attending nursing school Rains lived at the Phyllis Wheatley Settlement House because she was denied housing in the dormitory. In 1933 Rains began her nursing career at Minneapolis General Hospital (now Hennepin County Medical Center). She went on to work with the Visiting nurse association in New Orleans, Louisiana as well as the Herman Kiefer Hospital in Detroit, Michigan.

Rains was also an educator, teaching at Meharry Medical College in Nashville and then serving as director nursing services at Hubbard Hospital located at Meharry. In 1951 she married Dr. Horace Rains. The couple relocated to California where Rains worked at her husband's medical practice. She also taught at the University of Southern California General Hospital.

Rains died on May 21, 2006 in Long Beach, California.

In 2019, the Frances McHie Nursing Scholarship was established in her honor.

Rains' experience of gaining access to an education at the University of Minnesota School of Nursing is highlighted in the 2020 article A History of Systemic Racism at the University of Minnesota School of Nursing.
