= Elenora A. Cawthon =

American university professor

Elenora Albrecht Cawthon (1917–2016) was an American professor and university leader at Louisiana Tech. She served as president of the College Placement Council in 1972–1973 and was an officer of the American Association of University Women in the 1950s.

== Early life ==
Cawthon was born December 6, 1917, in Mission Valley in Victoria County, Texas. Her parents were Lillie Lassmann and Otto H. Albrecht. She attended Patti Wlder High School and Victoria Junior College. She then attended the University of Texas at Austin, receiving a BA with highest honors in 1938 and a master's degree in education in 1939. She then taught in public schools in Bandera, Texas, and Woodsboro, Texas. She married John Ardis Cawthon, who she met while they were graduate students. The couple married in 1948 at Zion Lutheran Church in Mission Valley, one day before receiving their PhDs from UT. Her doctorate was in curriculum and instruction, psychology, education administration and educational supervision. Her mother died on April 5, 1967, and her father died on July 21, 1971.

== Career ==
She taught in public schools in Texas before starting at Arkansas Tech University, where she worked from 1948 to 1954 as director of student teaching and acting head of the division of education. She was elected first vice president of the Arkansas Association of University Women in 1953 In 1954 she was elected president of the Business and Professional Women's Federation of Arkansas. She moved to Ruston in 1954 to join her husband who was faculty of Louisiana Tech University.

She then took a position at Louisiana Tech where she served as assistant director of placement services. In 1955, while still president of the Arkansas Federation of Business and Professional Women, she was elected vice-president of the American Association of University Women. By 1956 she was the director of the department of placement and services at Louisiana Tech.

In 1962 she was elected education representative to the College Placement Council and by 1972 she was national president of the council, still serving as director of placement at Louisiana Tech.

In the late 1970s, she was dean of student service at Louisiana Tech. She retired in 1988, continuing to serve as dean emeritus of student services. In 1990 she named the 5th District's second representative on the Louisiana State University Board of Supervisors where she continued to serve for a number of years.

During her career, she served a number of roles in civic and professional societies. She was a member of the American Association of University Women, Pi Sigma Alpha (social science fraternity), Pi Lambda Theta (education fraternity), Delta Kappa Gamma (society for women teachers), Business and Professional Women's Club, National Council for the Social Studies, the Association for Student Teaching, and Alpha Tau Delta.

== Death ==
She died on June 1, 2016, in Carrollton, Texas. Her funeral was at Zion Lutheran Church in Mission Valley and she was buried in Mission Valley Cemetery.
