= Anna D. Wolf =

Anna Dryden Wolf (June 25, 1890 – 1985) was an American nurse who served as the first dean of the Peking Union Medical College School of Nursing in Beijing, China, and later as the director of the school of nursing and nursing services at Johns Hopkins University. Her dedication to higher-level nursing education has been credited with laying the groundwork for the foundation of the Johns Hopkins School of Nursing in 1984.

== Biography ==
Wolf was born on June 25, 1890, in Guntur, Madras Presidency, India, to I.B. Wolf, a retired Indian missionary, and his wife, a teacher at an Indian all-women school. She received her B.A. from Goucher College in 1911, her nursing degree from the Johns Hopkins Hospital School of Nursing in 1915, and her M.A. from Columbia University Teachers College in 1916.

She subsequently worked at Johns Hopkins as an instructor and the assistant superintendent of nurses, taking time off in 1918 to work as a nursing instructor at the Vassar Training Camp. She became the superintendent of nurses at Peking Union Medical College in 1919, and became the first dean of the school of nursing there in 1924.

In 1926, she became an associate professor at the University of Chicago, as well as superintendent of nursing at Albert Merritt Billings Hospital. She worked at New York Hospital-Cornell Medical Center from 1931 until 1940, when she returned to Johns Hopkins to become director of the school of nursing and nursing services. She retired from this position in 1955.
