= University of Minnesota School of Nursing =

Minnesota university of nursing school

- Type: Public
- Established: 1909
- Dean: Connie Delaney
- Students: 880
- Location: Minneapolis & Rochester, Minnesota, United States
- Campus: Urban
- Website: www.nursing.umn.edu

The University of Minnesota School of Nursing is the nursing school of the University of Minnesota that was founded in 1909. It is the nation's first and oldest continuously operated university-based school of nursing. It has historically been an innovator in nursing, it was the first university to create a Bachelor of Science in Nursing and it graduated the first bachelor's degree nurses in 1909. It is ranked amongst the nation's top nursing schools, it has a research budget of $6 million each year, and produces more than half of the faculty in Minnesota's public and private nursing schools and advanced practice nurses. College courses and continuing education are offered at the University of Minnesota East Bank in Minneapolis and at the University of Minnesota, Rochester campus in Rochester, Minnesota.

It is notable as first school of nursing in the nation to offer Doctor of Nursing Practice programs in Certified Registered Nurse Anesthetist, Nursing Informatics and Health Innovation and Leadership as well as the first to create a midwifery program to be fully accredited within a Doctor of Nursing Practice degree. It offers the Bachelor of Nursing, Master of Nursing, Doctorate of Nursing Practice, Philosophy Doctorate in Nursing as well as certificates and continuing education.

== Historical Timeline ==
University of Minnesota School of Nursing Timeline

- 1908, Oct 1: University of Minnesota Board of Regents approved the establishment of the School for Nurses (as it was originally named).
- 1909, March 1: First class of 4 students was admitted to the three-year nursing curriculum of the University of Minnesota. The other 1,129 schools of nursing in the United States at that time were located within hospitals, not universities.
- 1910, Sept 10: Louise M. Powell appointed Superintendent of Nurses.
- 1911: University Hospital (named Elliot Hospital originally) opened, a significant improvement over the prior facilities, converted from living quarters to medical facilities within two adjacent houses.
- 1916: Marion L. Vannier became instructor.
- 1917-1918 World War I
  - Powell became acting director of the hospital when the existing director went to the surgeon general's office in Washing DC; while still remaining superintendent of nurses and instructor of the School for Nurses.
  - 300 - 500 navy hospital corpsmen were trained for their work overseas.
  - Base Hospital 26 was organized of nurses and surgeons from the university to serve overseas during the war.
- 1918 Flu Epidemic
  - The first public health course was offered, which assisted with caring for those affected by the influenza epidemic.
- 1919, June 9: The 5-year program resulting in a Bachelor of Science in Nursing was announced.
- 1920, April 14: The school changed its name to School of Nursing.
- 1923: Louise Powell completed her BS degree, and was appointed full-time Director of the School of Nursing.
- 1924: Marion L. Vannier replaced Powell as Director of the School of Nursing.
- 1929: Lucile Petry appointed as Instructor.
  - The State Legislature, led by Sylvanus Stockwell, force the School to admit Frances Rains and ban race-based discrimination.
- 1930: Katharine Jane Densford replaced Vannier as Director of the School of Nursing.
- Depression
- 1932: The "Learn-Earn Plan" was instituted. Graduate nurses were provided maintenance and $10/month by resident hospitals to provide care, while enrolled in graduate clinical courses that were applicable to their bachelor's degree.
- 1932: Frances Rains becomes the first Black woman to graduate from the nursing school.
- 1933, October: Nurses Hall was dedicated. Built as a combination dormitory, classroom wing and office wing, it was constructed between 1931 and 1933. It was named Powell Hall in 1939, the first time a university building had been named for a living person.
- World War II
  - 1940, August: Base Hospital Unit 26 was re-organized at University Hospital to provide care overseas on the front line of the war.
  - 1943, November: School of Nursing recognized by Surgeon General for enrolling the largest number of students in the US Cadet Nurse Program (launched July 1943).
- 1949, Fall: The first 4 men were admitted as students. There were only 6 male RN's in the state at the time.
- 1959: Katharine Jane Densford retired after 29 years as director, was replaced by Edna L. Fritz.
- 1969: The Health Sciences unit was created within the university. M. Isabel Harris was appointed acting dean.
- 1975: Irene G. Ramey was appointed the second dean.
- 1980: Ellen T. Fahey was appointed the third dean.
- 1981: The school moved to Unit F (shared with pharmacy)
- 1982: The nursing doctoral program began.
- 1990: Sandra Edwardson appointed fourth dean.
- 1991: Public Health Nursing program was transferred to the School of Nursing from the School of Public Health
- 1996: Unit F renamed Weaver-Densford Hall.
- 1997: Katharine J. Densford International Center for Nursing Leadership established, Mary Jo Krietzer names as founding director.
- 2000: Joanne Disch was appointed director of the Densford Center.
- 2005: Connie White Delaney was appointed the fifth dean.
- 2013: Bentson Healthy Communities Innovation Center opened - a state-of-the-art learning simulation center.

== Organization ==
The School is organized into Cooperative Units instead of traditional departments. These are:

- Adult and Gerontological Health
- Child and Family Health
- Population Health and Systems

== Building and facilities ==
In 2013 the University of Minnesota built the Bentson Center, an 11,000 square foot renovated space that includes multiple care simulation labs, a large study space, and work stations. The center was named to honor the Bentson Foundation who, along with HealthPartners, donated a majority of the funds to build the facility.

== Notable people ==
- Richard Olding Beard
- Louise M. Powell
- Pearl McIver
- Myrtle Aydelotte
- Mildred Irene Clark
- Lucile Petry Leone
- Katharine Jane Densford
- Cecilia H. Hauge
- Mabel Larson Roach
- Clara Adams-Ender
- Margaret Newman
- Ruth Nelson Knollmueller
- Joanne Disch
- Drusilla R. Poole
