= Margaret Newman (nurse) =

American nursing theorist (1933–2018)

Margaret A. Newman (October 10, 1933 - December 18, 2018) was an American nurse, university professor and nursing theorist. She authored the theory of health as expanding consciousness, which was influenced by earlier theoretical work by Martha E. Rogers, one of her mentors from graduate school. Newman was designated a Living Legend of the American Academy of Nursing.

== Biography ==
Newman earned a degree in home economics and English from Baylor University. She spent five years caring for her mother, who was dying of amyotrophic lateral sclerosis (Lou Gehrig's disease). "The 5 years I spent with her before she died were difficult, tiring, restrictive in some ways, but intense, loving, and expanding in other ways," she later wrote. After going through these experiences, Newman decided to become a nurse.

Newman graduated from the University of Tennessee College of Nursing, then earned a master's degree at the University of California, San Francisco and a PhD in nursing from New York University (NYU). Early in her academic career, she held teaching positions at Tennessee, NYU and Pennsylvania State University.

Newman taught at the University of Minnesota School of Nursing until her retirement in 1996. She served as a nursing research consultant to the U.S. Surgeon General in the 1980s. Her theory of health as expanding consciousness was presented at a nursing theory conference in the late 1970s. She expanded the theory by studying its use in cardiac disease and cancer from 1986 to 1997. The theory is based on the science of unitary human beings written by Martha E. Rogers. Newman had studied under Rogers in the Ph.D. program at NYU. Rather than framing health as the opposite of disease, Newman held that health included patterns of disease.

In 2008, the American Academy of Nursing recognized Newman as a Living Legend, an honor which is awarded to a small group of nurses "in honor of their extraordinary contributions to the nursing profession, sustained over the course of their careers."

Newman died on December 18, 2018.
