= Cadet Nurse Corps =

Former program of the United States government

- Seal of the U.S. Public Health Service (USPHS)

Agency overview
- Formed: 1 July 1943
- Dissolved: 31 December 1948
- Headquarters: United States
- Agency executive: Lucile Petry, Registered Nurse (RN)
- Parent agency: United States Public Health Service (USPHS)

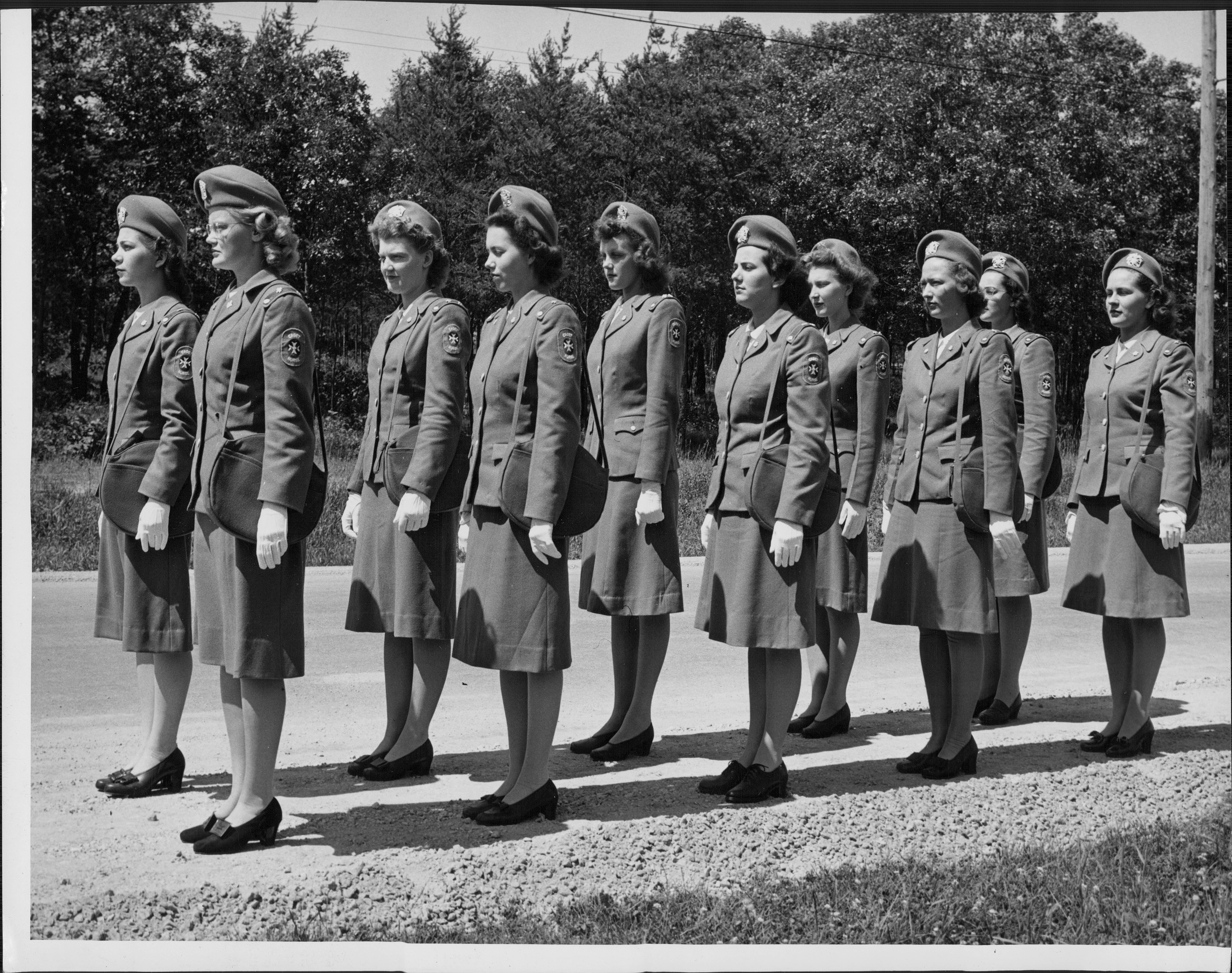
Inspection of Senior Cadet Nurses at Camp McCoy

The United States (U.S.) Cadet Nurse Corps (CNC) for women was authorized by the U.S. Congress on 15 June 1943 and signed into law by president Franklin D. Roosevelt on 1 July. The purpose of the law was to alleviate the nursing shortage that existed before and during World War II. The legislative act contained a specific provision that prohibited discrimination based upon race, color, or creed. The United States Public Health Service (USPHS) was named the supervisory agency; it was answerable to Thomas Parran, Jr. the surgeon general of the United States. The USPHS established a separate division to administer the CNC program and Parran appointed Lucile Petry a registered nurse (RN) as its director.

The program was open to all women between the ages of 17 and 35 who were in good health and had graduated from an accredited high school. Nearly every type of media source advertised for the CNC. All state nursing schools in the U.S. were eligible to participate in the program; they were, however, required to be accredited by the accrediting agency in their state and be connected with a hospital that had been approved by the American College of Surgeons. The participating schools of nursing were required to compress the traditional 36-month nursing program into 30 months, and they were obligated to provide students with the clinical experiences of medicine, surgery, pediatrics, and obstetrics.

The cadets came from locations across the nation and from all backgrounds. The CNC allowed young women to serve their country in uniform while being protected by law against discrimination. Of the 1,300 schools of nursing in the country, 1,125 participated in the program. The CNC operated from 1943 until 1948; during this period 179,294 student nurses enrolled in the program and 124,065 of them graduated from participating nursing schools. The American Hospital Association credited the cadet student nurses with helping to prevent a collapse of civilian nursing in the U.S. during World War II.

== Background ==
The U.S. experienced a shortage of nurses long before its entry into World War II; this shortage worsened with the prewar buildup of the military and industrial upturn that this caused. Professional nursing groups were unprepared to deal with the problem. On 10 July 1940, however, the situation changed when Isabel M. Stewart, professor of nursing at Columbia University and a member of the National League for Nursing, wrote to its president: "I believe we should have a committee or board that is representative of the nursing profession as a whole and it should be at work now ... Within three weeks, on 29 July 1940, representatives of the national nursing community gathered in New York City, under the umbrella of the American Nurses Association, where they formed the Nursing Council on National Defense. In its first order of business, the council concentrated on surveying nursing resources and securing federal funding to expand nursing educational opportunities.

The survey results indicated that 100,000 nurses were eligible for military service, and that most nursing schools were ill-equipped to enlarge their instructional or housing facilities. The council submitted its federal aid request for fiscal year 1 July 1941 to 30 June 1942 to the U.S. commissioner of education, who approved it and moved it on to the Bureau of the Budget. The Congress then enacted and funded the Nurse Training Program, which assisted in the education of 12,000 students at 309 nursing schools. Through the program, 3,800 inactive nurses received refresher courses and 4,800 graduate nurses received postgraduate training. By the end of the fiscal year, 47,500 students were enrolled in nursing schools but this did not meet the country's demands. Nurses could not be trained quickly enough to keep pace with the country's civilian and military needs.

During 1942 the Office of War Information tried to mobilize interest in the nursing profession, using prime-time radio advertisements to focus their broadcasts on interviews, dramatic sketches, and spot announcements urging young women to join the nursing profession. While these efforts were helpful, they did not meet expectations. The supporters of the nurse training programs recommended doubling federal aid for basic nursing education in the fiscal year ending 30 June 1943. Representative Frances P. Bolton of Ohio, a longtime advocate of nursing, supported the proposed increase in federal aid and informed the Congress that further aid requests for nurse training programs were likely.

== Creation of the program ==
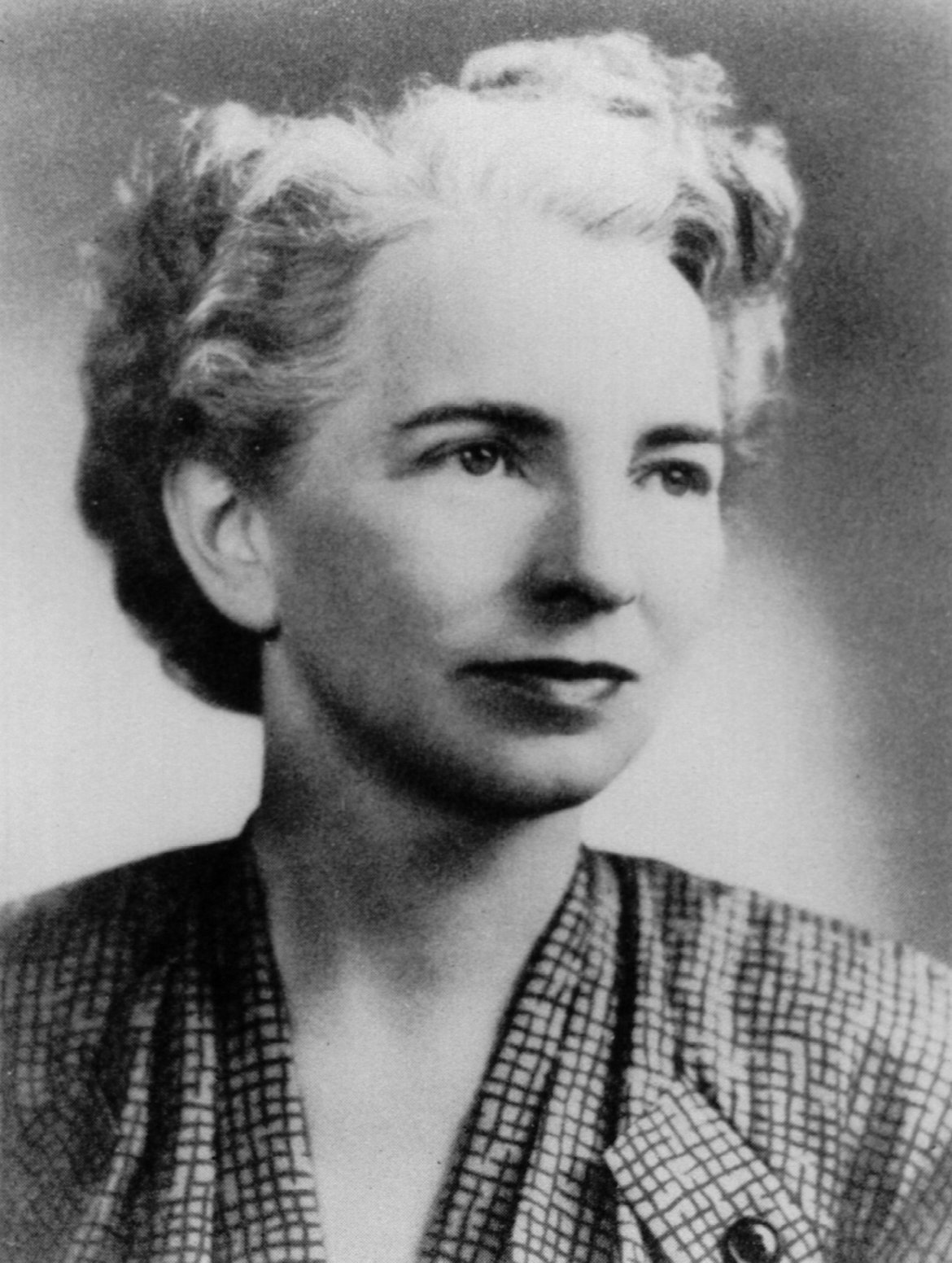
Lucile Petry (RN) was the director of the Cadet Nurse Corps from 1943 to 1948

On 29 March 1943 Bolton took the initiative and introduced H.R. 2326, a bill to create and fund a training program for nurses. The Senate added an amendment that prohibited discrimination based upon race, color, or creed. At the bill's legislative hearings, hospital groups explained how distressed nursing care in civilian hospitals had become. Support for the bill also came in the form of letters and telegrams. The bill passed both houses of the Congress by unanimous vote on 15 June 1943 and became Public Law 74 on 1 July 1943; with the title of Nurse Training Act of 1943 but commonly referred to as the Bolton act. It provided for the training of nurses for the armed forces, government and civilian hospitals, health agencies, and war industries through grants to the institutions providing the training. (Note: In G. I. Nightingales, Barbara Tomblin describes how the CNC became a new program: "The decision to create a new program rather than to reinstitute the old Army School of Nursing was a sharp break with Army Nurse Corps tradition. However, the Congress and the Army felt it would be more efficient and economical to use existing civilian nursing schools and facilities than to create a military structure to provide more graduate nurses ... ".) It also contained a provision requiring that those trained under the act would comprise a uniformed body but without military status.

The Division of Nurse Education was established in the USPHS to supervise the program; it was answerable to the surgeon general of the United States, Thomas Parran Jr. He appointed Lucile Petry (RN), a registered nurse, as its director. The federal security administrator was required to appoint an advisory committee to assist in guiding the nurse-training programs. The committee consisted of people in the nursing and related fields who were drawn from various parts of the country. (Note: Advisory committee: Isabel M. Stewart, Columbia University; Anna D. Wolf, Johns Hopkins Hospital; Marion C. Howell, Western Reserve University; Estelle Massey Riddle, National Nursing Council; Margaret Tracy, University of California; Sister Helen Jarrell, Loyola University; James A. Hamilton, American Hospital Assn.; Oliver C. Carmichael, Vanderbilt University; Hyrum Leo Marshall, University of Utah; A. M. Schwitalla, S.J., St. Louis University) On 25 June 1943, the committee met for the first time with government officials to establish the rules and regulations to carry out the act. As required, they were approved by the surgeon general and published in the Federal Register.

The surgeon general then sent telegrams that outlined the program to 1,300 nursing schools in the United States and Puerto Rico. This was followed up with applications and instructions sent by mail. The Territory of Hawaii's two nursing schools were not eligible for the program because they were in a war zone and the Territory of Alaska had no nursing schools at the time. The regulations required interested nursing schools to:

- be state accredited;
- be connected with a hospital approved by the American College of Surgeons or a hospital of equal standards;
- maintain adequate instructional facilities and personnel;
- provide adequate clinical experience in four basic services—medicine, surgery, pediatrics, and obstetrics;
- provide maintenance and a stipend of $30.00 for all senior cadet nurses, or arrange for their requested transfer to federal or other hospitals (a student nurse became a senior cadet in the last six months before graduation);
- provide satisfactory living facilities and an adequate health service for students;
- provide for an accelerated program; and
- restrict its hours of practice.

The standards of the National League for Nursing were adopted to evaluate the participating schools. After issuing these regulations, the surgeon general said:

The schools of nursing are free to select students, to plan curricula, and to formulate policies consistent with the Act and the traditions of the institution concerned. This is a partnership job between the USPHS, the institutions, and the students ... .

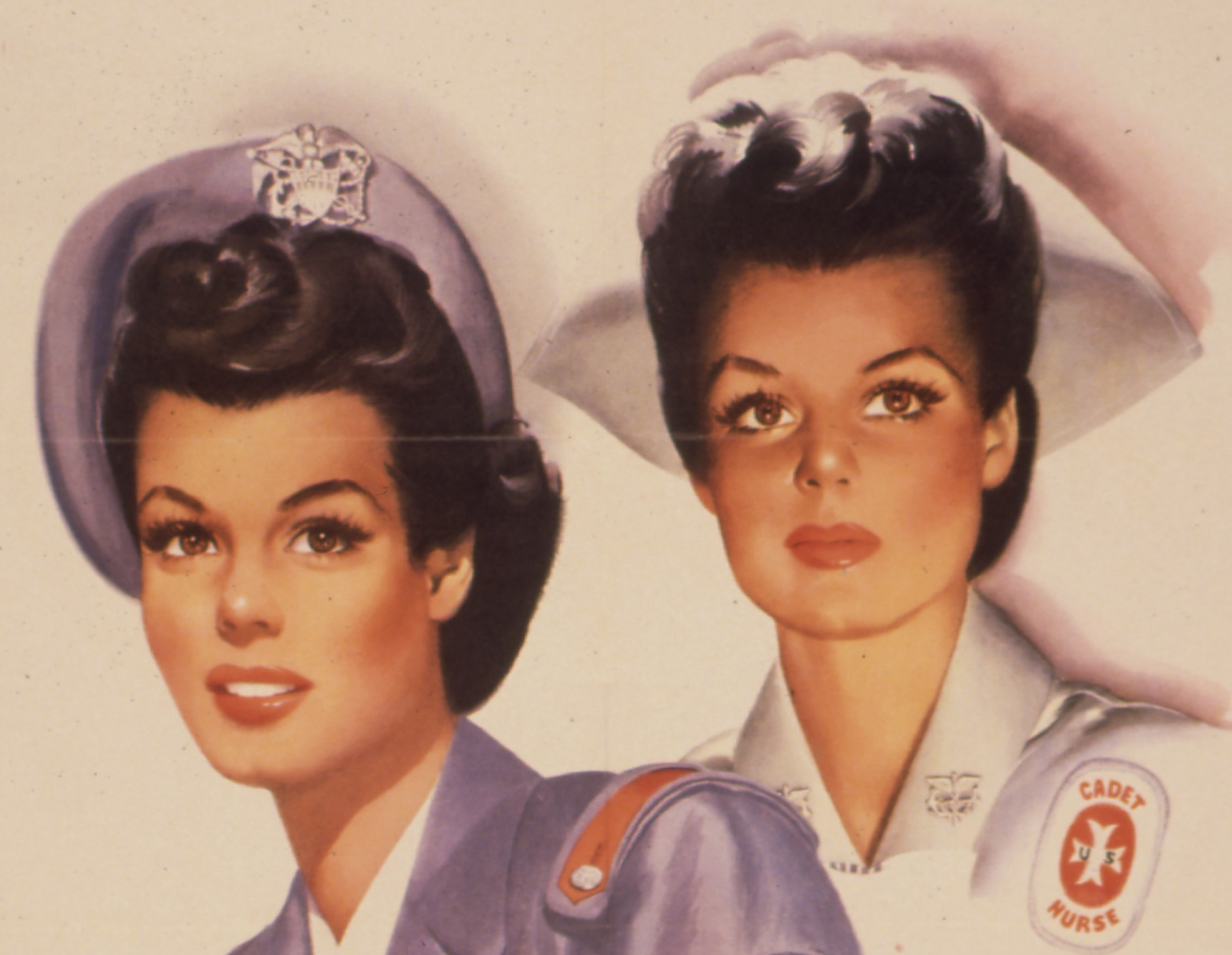
"Be a cadet nurse - The girl with a future" poster by the U. S. Public Health Service

The CNC was open to all women between the ages of 17 and 35 who were in good health and had graduated from an accredited high school. Marriage was permissible subject to individual nursing school guidelines. Successful applicants were eligible for a government subsidy that paid for tuition, books, uniforms, and a stipend. In exchange, student cadets were required to pledge to actively serve in essential civilian or federal government services for the duration of World War II.[17] The corps pledge was a statement of good intentions rather than a legal contract.[18]

All state-accredited schools of nursing were eligible to participate in the program; each school, however, was required to apply individually. Of the 1,300 nursing schools in the country, 1,125 participated. For this program, the traditional 36-month nurse training was accelerated to 30 months. Senior nursing students were required to work for a six-month period in a hospital or in another health agency. In return, the federal government would pay the schools for the related tuition and fees of the students.

The advisory committee was also responsible for naming the new program. The Victory Nurse Corps and the Student War Nursing Reserve were considered, but both names were rejected in favor of the United States Cadet Nurse Corps (CNC).

== Housing ==
In its 1940 survey, the Nursing Council on National Defense reported that most of the nursing schools in the U.S. were ill-equipped to enlarge their housing and classroom facilities. In the following two fiscal years, federal aid was provided to nursing schools for nurse training but it did not provide any aid for housing facilities. Even with the passage of the Nurse Training Act of 1943, the problem remained. Some schools were able to rent or purchase additional buildings; those that could not requested assistance from the federal government. Without funds for physical facilities, the USPHS arranged with the Federal Works Agency to allow nursing schools to share in some of the construction funds provided under the National Defense Act of 1940. The two federal agencies agreed the need for housing and other facilities in nursing schools would be based on school participation in the CNC program. The Federal Works Agency would decide where, how, and to whom the aid would be granted.

Under the agreement, the schools of nursing that could not otherwise accommodate classes would receive a share of the federal aid for housing. It would include aid for living quarters, library space, classrooms, and demonstration rooms. The amount allocated for construction projects was $25,657,785. The Federal Works Agency projects started in September 1943 and ended in November 1944; during this period, about 400 applications consisting of 160 for training facilities, 172 for construction, and 68 for the purchase, lease, or renovation of existing buildings were cleared. Nursing schools in all but nine states were helped by the federal aid; the arrangement called for the nursing schools to share in the cost of the projects. Of the $25,657,785 spent on the nursing school projects, federal aid paid $17,397,002 (about 67.8 percent) and the nursing schools paid $8,260,783 (about 32.2 percent).

== Recruitment ==
=== General ===
The USPHS recruiting campaign was aimed at reaching the maximum number of potential applicants in the shortest period of time. The primary target was the high-school graduate but college women were also recruited. The selling point was a free education in a proud profession while providing an essential service to the country. Appeals to join the CNC reached more than 7,000,000 newspaper and magazine readers, and millions of radio listeners and movie patrons around the country. Pleas were made in speeches, through billboards, and in leaflets. U.S. corporations donated $13,000,000 worth of advertising space and technical services to the program in one year. Nearly every type of media source advertised for the CNC.

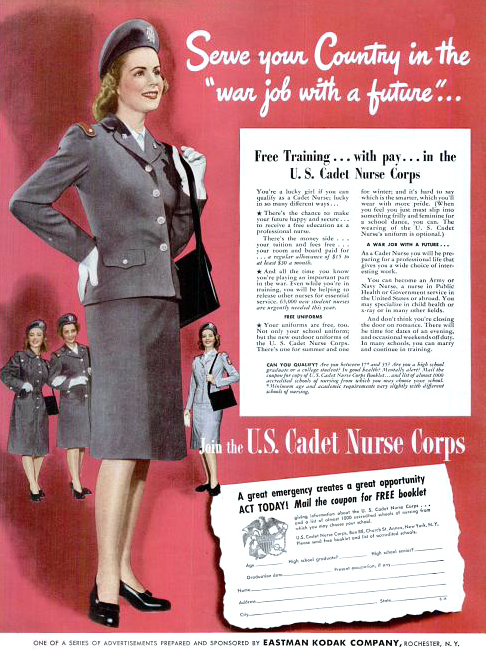
A recruiting advertisement in Life magazine, 24 January 1944

The Eastman Kodak Company sponsored a full-page advertisement in Life magazine (24 January 1944) touting the CNC as a way to serve the country in "a war job with a future". The advertisement said young women who could qualify as cadet nurses were "lucky girls" who were eligible for free training with pay, room and board, and gray uniforms with gray berets. The uniforms were described as one for summer and one for winter, which "you'll wear with pride". Applicants were assured they could wear something "frilly and feminine" instead of uniforms for dances, that they would have time for dating, and that many schools allowed students to marry.

In the same year, a motion-picture company produced a recruiting film about the CNC called Reward Unlimited for the USPHS. Mary C. McCall Jr. wrote the story and Dorothy McGuire played the lead role of Peggy Adams, a cadet nurse. The ten-minute film shows the way that Peggy Adams decided to become a cadet nurse, along with her training and everyday nursing experiences. Reward Unlimited received awards for the best recruitment film for 1944; it was shown in 16,000 theaters and seen by an audience of 90 million.

The American Hospital Association established recruitment centers in all 1,125 participating nursing schools. Using recruiting booths, volunteers disseminated information about the opportunities offered by the CNC to potential candidates. State and local nursing councils, and many other organizations, associations, and volunteers aided the recruitment effort. In the fiscal year 1943—the first year of enrollment—65,521 nursing students registered. In the 1944 enrollment period, 61,471 registered. In the 1945 enrollment period, 3,000 students were admitted to what would be the final class of the program.

=== Minority women ===
The Nurse Training Act of 1943 prohibited discrimination against race, creed, or color. However:

Little is known about the degree to which [1,125] schools of nursing participating in the Cadet Nurse Corps actually admitted students regardless of race or ethnicity...

— Elise M. Szecsy (Note: Elsie M. Szecsy Ed. D. is the daughter of a former Cadet Nurse Corps member who was a cadet nurse from 1943 to 1946. Szecsy is an academic professional emerita at Arizona State University. Author of "The Cadet Nurse Corps of Arizona" (2016), Szecsy dedicated the book to all Cadet Nurse Corps members. Proceeds from the sale of the book will be used to support the Cadet Nurse Corps Foundedation of which she is a director as of 2023.), "Cadet Nurse Corps in Arizona", A History of Service

The CNC enrollment of each student was recorded on a membership card; however, it did not require the student to list her race or ethnicity. Thus, increasing the difficulty to ascertain the diversity across participating nursing schools.

==== African American ====
African American organizations had actively advocated for discriminatory changes in the American society and in military policies. The non-discrimination provision in the CNC legislation of 1943 had a positive effect on encouraging young African American women to enter the nursing profession, in particular, those women who could not afford to pay for a nursing education. Some 2,000 students attended 20 black institutions, while around 400 students were enrolled in 42 white schools. The African American press helped the CNC in its efforts to recruit black women as did community leaders. Some of these cadets took part in public ceremonies and were the subject of special feature stories released to their local newspapers. In 1940, there were 230 black-owned newspapers in the United States. They were publishing regularly in Baltimore; Washington, DC; Chicago; New York; Philadelphia; and Atlanta.

==== Japanese American ====
The bombing attack on Pearl Harbor on 7 December 1941 by the Empire of Japan caused hysteria among residents along the Pacific coast where many Japanese Americans lived - including the Nisei generation. The U.S. intelligence found that the majority of Japanese Americans were not security threats and posed no danger to the country. The press, patriotic organizations, and others continued to fuel the fire for their removal from the Pacific coast. On 16 February 1942, President Franklin D. Roosevelt (bowing to political pressure) signed Executive Order 9066; the order caused the evacuation of people of Japanese ancestry from the Pacific coast states. The order uprooted in excess of 100,000 men, women, and children from their homes and farms, jobs, and schools. Forcibly removed, they were interned at ten relocation camps in seven states.

Among those interned included Nisei women students who were attending nursing schools in the coastal states of California, Oregon, and Washington. Many of these students volunteered to staff relocation hospitals, and so did other Nisei women after completing nurse's aid training.

The non-discrimination provision in the CNC legislation of 1943 opened the portal for more than 400 Japanese (Nisei) American women to become cadet nurses. Of the 1,125 schools of nursing that participated in the CNC program, only about 70 schools of nursing opened their enrollment to Japanese American women. Too few nursing schools were open to Japanese American women; it was perceived that hospital staff and patients would not trust them.

==== Native American ====
There is no ready record of the number of Native American women who participated in the CNC program across the country. The only accredited school of nursing for Native Americans in the entire United States then was the Sage Memorial Hospital School of Nursing, located in Ganado, Arizona, the heart of the Navajo Nation.

The hospital opened in 1930 and closed in 1953. Over its operating life, the Sage School of Nursing graduated about 150 Native American women from more than 50 tribes. Among them were about 39 women who were enrolled in the Cadet Nurse program. Sage excluded white students, reportedly because they had many other options while Native Americans did not. Later, they accepted Hispanic and Asian American nursing students.

== Uniforms ==
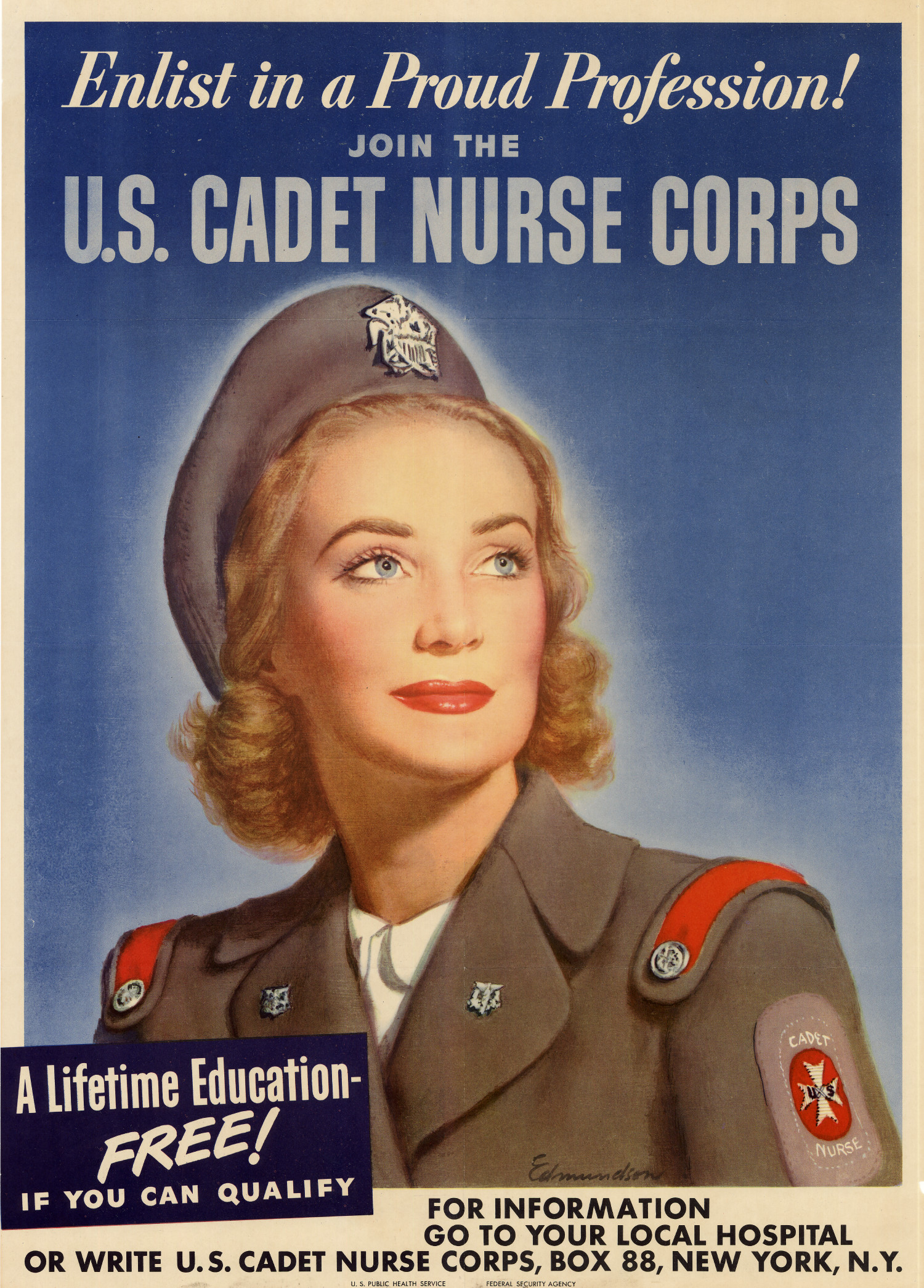
The outdoor or winter uniform of the Cadet Nurse Corps

The outdoor uniforms of the CNC were designed to be distinctive and to identify each cadet as a member of the corps. There was one uniform for winter and another for summer. The winter uniform was a gray, woolen, single-breasted jacket suit, a gored skirt, and a gray, velour overcoat. A gray Montgomery beret, similar to the one worn by the British general, Bernard Montgomery, was worn with both of the uniforms. The summer uniform consisted of a two-piece, gray-and-white-striped, cotton suit and a gray twill raincoat. The winter uniform was one of three designs created by professional designers and introduced in a fashion show at New York City on 16 August 1943. Thirty-two fashion editors judged this uniform and the Montgomery beret as the winners. The selected uniform style was said to be attractive enough to have provided an incentive for young women to join the CNC.

The official outdoor uniforms—with the exception of blouse, gloves, shoes, and stockings—were supplied to the cadets by the institution in which they were enrolled. The students paid for the excluded items. The indoor or work uniforms varied from school to school; these were purchased by the school from federal grants.

The insignia of the CNC was the Maltese Cross. The insignia was worn on the left shoulder of the uniforms and on the student nurse uniform of the official school of nursing. The USPHS official insignia was worn on the jacket lapels and was also present on the silver buttons. On the Montgomery beret, the USPHS insignia was worn beneath the spread eagle and the American Shield. Wearing the CNC outdoor uniforms was optional for all cadets, except when instructed to do otherwise.

== Training ==
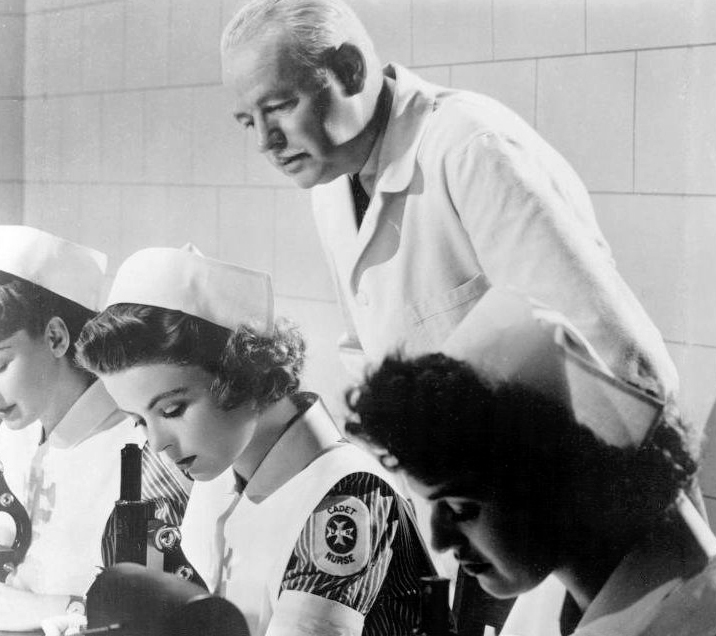
Cadet Nurse Peggy Adams (Dorothy McGuire) studies in the bacteriology laboratory in Reward Unlimited (1944), a promotional short film produced for the Public Health Service

The participating schools of nursing were required to compress the traditional nursing program to 30 instead of 36 months, and they were to provide students with the four clinical experiences of medicine, surgery, pediatrics, and obstetrics. The students became senior cadets in their last six months before graduation, requiring them to serve in a federal or civilian hospital where they provided the equivalent services to those of a graduate nurse. During their first nine months of training, cadets were protected by regulation from working on the hospital wards for more than 24 hours each week. Junior cadets typically worked between 40 and 48 hours each week, including classes; senior cadets were free of classes. All state boards of nursing modified their regulations to agree with the accelerated program.

The quality and standards of the educational systems in which cadets would be trained varied considerably. In 1943, nursing schools, hospital administrators, and government officials assured the U.S. Congress the federally subsidized training of nurses would conform to the minimum standards. With his rule-making powers, the surgeon general issued these regulations:

- The school had to be accredited by the appropriate accrediting agency for schools of nursing in the state or territory;
- An institution offering a degree in nursing had to be accredited by the appropriate accrediting agency for universities and colleges.
- The school had to be connected with a hospital that had been approved by the American College of Surgeons, or that maintained standards of nursing equivalent to those required by the college. In a central school of nursing, the major hospital clinical unit had to meet these standards.
- The school had to require for admission not less than graduation from an accredited high-school;
- The school had to maintain an educational staff adequate to provide satisfactory instruction and supervision;
- Its curriculum had to include all those units of instruction necessary to conform with accepted practices in basic nursing education.
- The school had to provide adequate clinical experience in the four basic services – medicine, surgery, pediatrics, and obstetrics;
- The school had to provide well-balanced weekly schedules of organized instruction, experience and study;
- The school had to provide adequate and well-equipped classrooms, laboratories, libraries, and other necessary facilities for carrying out the program, and satisfactory living facilities and health service for students.
- In evaluating the adequacy of the school facilities to meet the various requirements specified, the standards of the National League of Nursing Education were to be used as a guide.

Congressional hearings on appropriations stressed all schools should be allowed to take part in the program. When the standards were applied against the existing conditions, they did not seem practical for some schools to achieve. Some accommodations were made for smaller schools by lowering the standards for them. They would be judged by criteria that included the qualifications and number of instructional personnel, their clinical facilities, the curricula, the weekly schedule of hours, and the health and guidance programs. Such schools produced a small percentage of the cadet force. While monitoring the standards of the 1,125 approved schools of nursing, the consultants of the Division of Nurse Education traveled thousands of miles, wrote countless letters, and provided direct and specific support services. The consultants were assigned to an area and each school was well known to them.

The CNC program began on 1 July 1943 and ended with the last group of graduating students on 31 December 1948 and included three enrollment periods; the first term was in 1943, the second in 1944, and the third and final term was in 1945. During this time, 179,294 students enrolled in the program and 124,065 of them graduated from the participating nursing schools. The main cause of student withdrawals was homesickness; some married students withdrew to be with their husbands when they were released from the military; others when the hostilities ceased; some failed in their studies; others left for health reasons; and some left because of the stress of a nursing career.

The CNC was the largest of the federal nurse training programs. The federal government spent $160,326,237 on the Nurse Training Act of 1943 for administration, uniforms, maintenance, tuition, fees, and stipends. By the end of the program, the records of all participating schools of nursing had been audited. The work of the field auditors resulted in the recovery of $2,200,000 of prepaid funds.

== Looking back ==
=== Cadet nurses ===
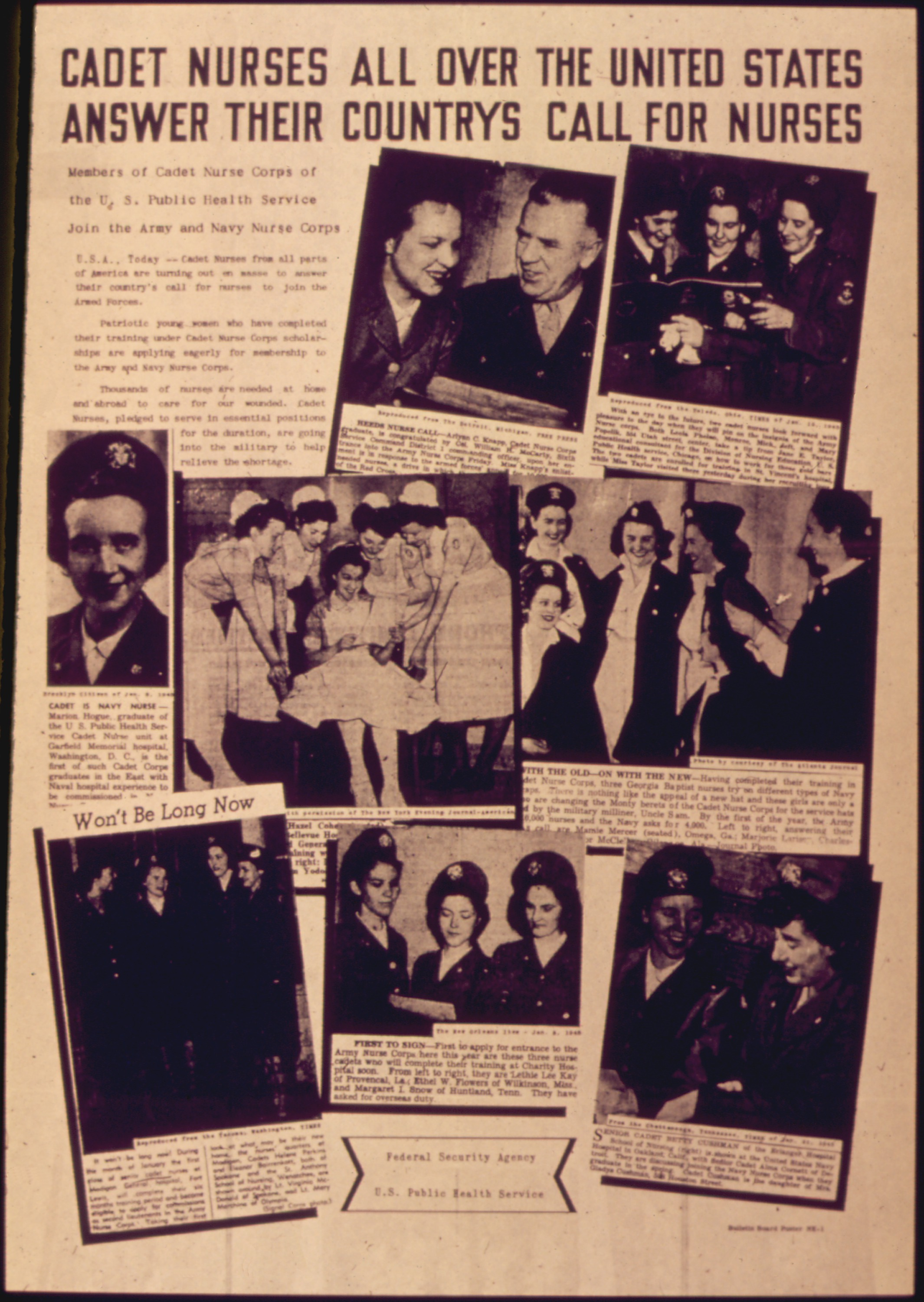
Cadet nurses from around the United States

Cadet nurses came from every state in the U.S.; they were the daughters of farmers and mechanics, of teachers, lawyers, clerks and businessmen. Some joined because they wished to become nurses and others for the free education. In the course of their training, cadet nurses served in Army and Navy hospitals, with the Indian Health Service, with the Veterans' Administration, and in Public Health hospitals. During and after World War II, student nurses restored the diminished capacity of civilian nurses; making a major contribution to the nation's civilian and military healthcare systems.

The American Hospital Association credited cadet student nurses with helping to prevent the collapse of civilian nursing care and commended them for replacing graduate nurses who enlisted in the armed forces during World War II. In Cadet Nurse Stories, the authors noted the CNC program influenced the way in which future nurses would be educated and trained in the United States. They also discern that Cadet nurses leave as their legacy the hope that those who aspire to a career in nursing will not be denied the education needed to achieve that goal. Without the U.S. Cadet Nurse Corps many women would not have accomplished their dream of becoming a nurse.

=== Cadet stories in their own words ===
Florence Blake Ford:

Frankly I jumped at the opportunity to become a cadet nurse because it was free, and if I completed the course I could earn more money than I currently made as a clerk. This decision of convenience turned out to be a decision made in heaven. I loved nursing.

Dorothie Melvin Crowley:

My cadet experience challenged me intellectually and physically. I learned about myself and what I was capable of doing. I look back on those years with great nostalgia and with pride that I made it. History and circumstances came together in the right way, at the right time, to offer me the right life choices.

Pauline M. Perry:

Why do so few remember us? Why did we, cadet nurses of World War II, not consider ourselves significant in a historical sense? Perhaps the selfness of our nurse training was so inbred that we made little effort to draw attention to our record. Perhaps we simply did not take the time to tell our stories.

Thelma M. Robinson (Note: Thelma M. Robinson and Pauline M. Perry (sisters) both graduated (at different times) from the Cadet Nurse Corps program. Both were career nurses. Robinson was a Registered Nurse (RN), with a Master of Science degree in Nursing (MSN) and a Pediatric Nursing Practitioner (PNP). Perry was a Registered Nurse (RN) and a Public Health Nurse (PHN). Between them, they have written three books about the Cadet Nurse Corps.):

The corps gave me the eagerness to move forward in my learning and to gain new skills and insights so I could broaden my horizon and provide a better nursing service.
