= Timeline of nursing history =

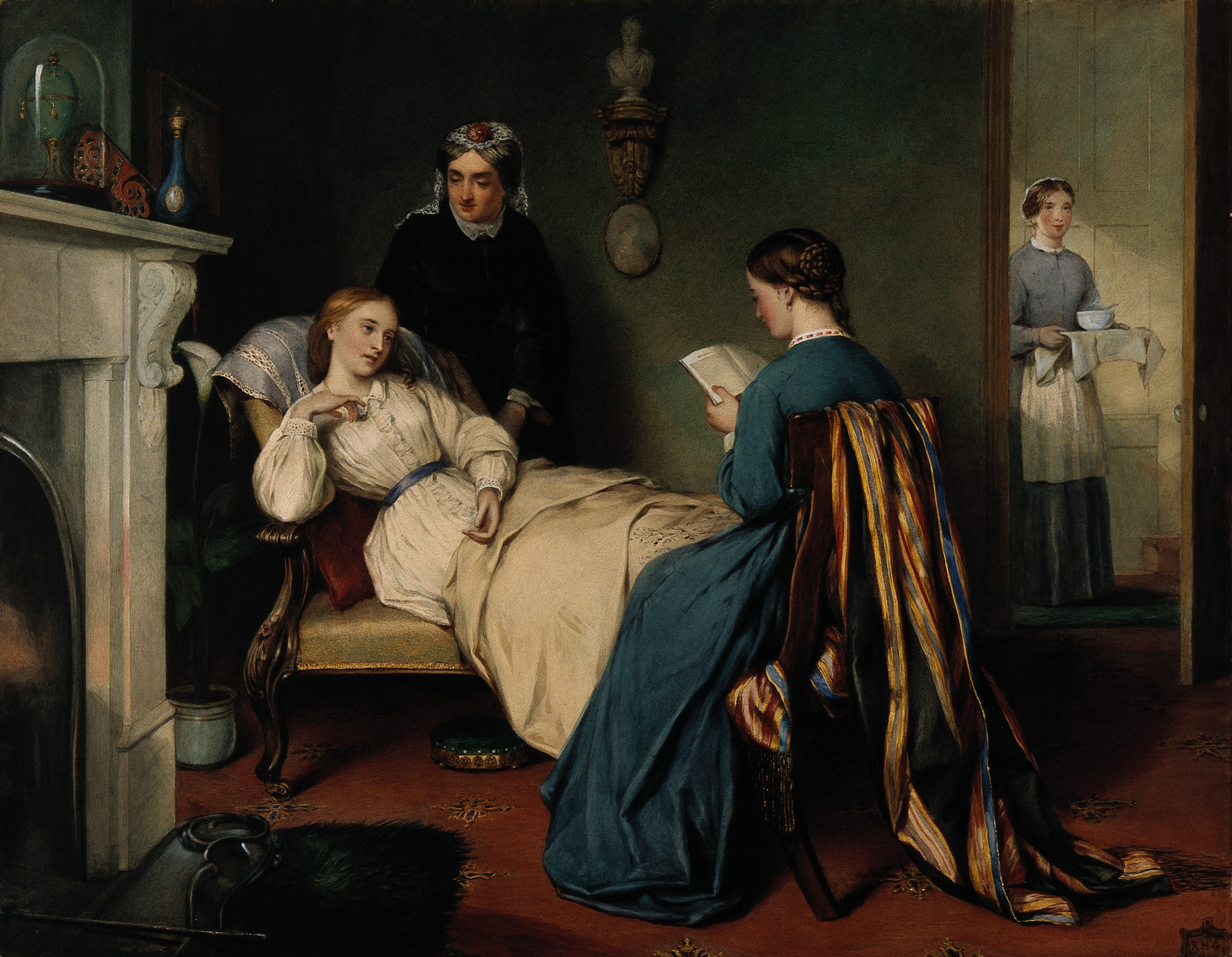
A girl reads to a convalescent while a nurse brings in the patient's medicine

== Prior to the 16th century ==
- 1–500 AD (approximately) – Religious organizations provided nursing and palliative care for individuals and families.
- 55 AD – Phoebe is traditionally associated with early Christian nursing and is described as a deaconess.
- 300 – Entry of Christian women into nursing.
- c. 390 AD – The first general hospital was established in Rome by Saint Fabiola.
- c. 620 AD – Rufaida Al-Aslamia became the first Muslim nurse.

== 16th century ==
- 1517 The Protestant Reformation – the breakdown of religious orders meant that monasteries, hospitals and nursing care facilities were closed in most Protestant areas.

== 17th century ==
St. Louise de Marillac

Sisters of Charity

- 1618–1648 – The Thirty Years' War – Catholic–Protestant wars rocked Europe, killing 8 million.
- 1633 – The founding of the Daughters of Charity of Saint Vincent de Paul, Servants of the Sick Poor by Sts. Vincent de Paul and Louise de Marillac. The community would not remain in a convent, but would nurse the poor in their homes, "having no monastery but the homes of the sick, their cell a hired room, their chapel the parish church, their enclosure the streets of the city or wards of the hospital."
- 1645 – French nurse Jeanne Mance established Hôtel-Dieu de Montréal, North America's first hospital.
- 1654 and 1656 – Sisters of Charity cared for the wounded on the battlefields at Sedan and Arras in France.
- 1660 – Over 40 houses of the Sisters of Charity existed in France and several in other countries; the sick poor were helped in their own houses in 26 parishes in Paris.

== 18th century ==
The 18th century was considered the Age of Reason. A lot of myths were contradicted by scientific fact. Jamaican "doctresses" such as Cubah Cornwallis, Sarah Adams and Grace Donne, the mistress and healer to Jamaica's most successful planter, Simon Taylor, had great success using hygiene and herbs to heal the sick and wounded.

== 19th century ==
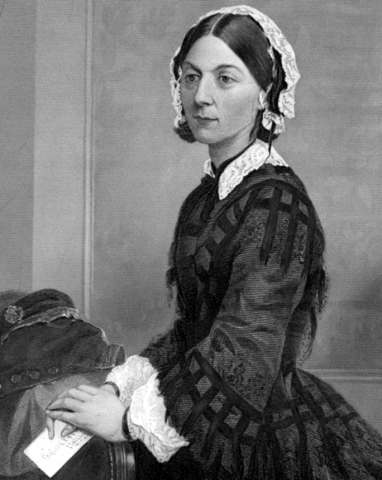
Florence Nightingale (1820–1910)

=== 1810s ===
- 1811 – The grand re-opening of Sydney Hospital (founded 1788 as a tent hospital). Convict men and women undertook the nursing.

=== 1820s ===
- c. 1820 – Ex-slave Jane Minor opens a hospital in Petersburg, Virginia.
- 1820 – Florence Nightingale (1820–1910) born at Villa La Columbaia in Florence (12 May).

=== 1830s ===
- 1838 – The first trained nurses arrived in Sydney, they were five Irish Sisters of Charity.
- 1839 – Nursing Society of Philadelphia (NSP).

=== 1840s ===
- 1840 – Settlement of New Zealand as a colony and the establishment of state hospitals.
- 1841 – People considered to be mentally-ill were considered criminals. The first case of insanity in New Zealand's society was recorded in 1841
- 1844 – Dorothea Dix testifies to the New Jersey legislature regarding the state's poor treatment of patients with mental illness.
- 1847 – Wellington Hospital was established, the first New Zealand hospital.
- 1848 – The Yarra Bend Asylum was opened so that the mentally-ill could be moved out of jail. This asylum was later known as Melbourne.

=== 1850s ===
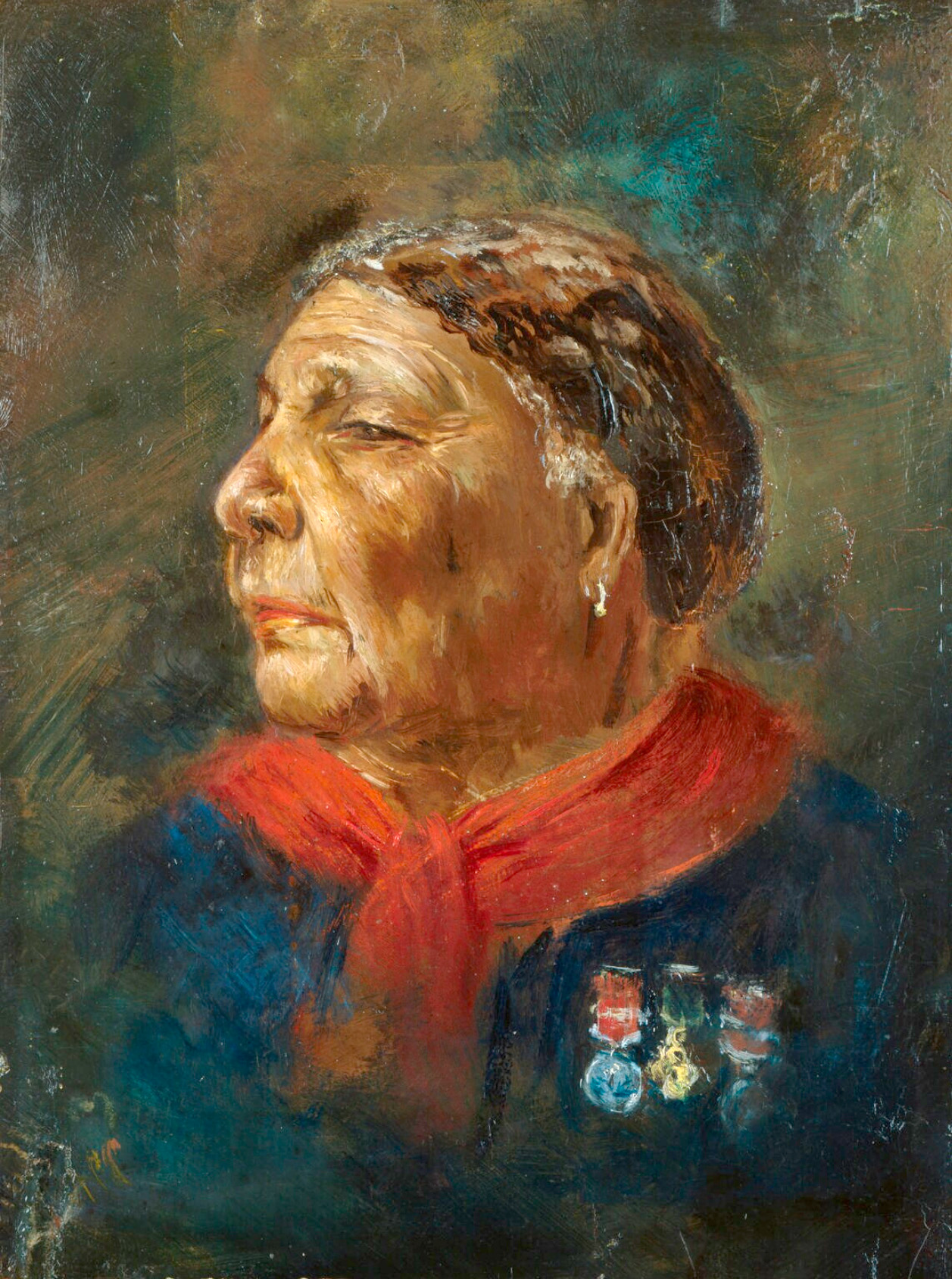
Mary Seacole

- 1850 – Instructional school for nurses opened by NSP.
- 1850 – Florence Nightingale, a pioneer of modern nursing, begins her training as a nurse at the Institute of St. Vincent de Paul at Alexandria, Egypt.
- 1851 – Florence Nightingale completed her nursing training at Kaiserwerth, Germany, a Protestant religious community with a hospital facility. She was there for approximately 3 months, and at the end, her teachers declared her trained as a nurse.
- 1851 – Mary Seacole travelled to Panama, where she worked at healing sufferers from cholera and other diseases.
- 1853 – Crimean War.
- 1853 – Seacole returned to the Colony of Jamaica, where she worked at healing sufferers from yellow fever.
- 1853 – Florence Nightingale went to Paris to study with the Sisters of Charity and was later appointed superintendent of the English General Hospitals in Turkey.
- 1854 – The first lunatic asylum was opened in Wellington, New Zealand.
- 1854 – Florence Nightingale appointed as the Superintendent of Nursing Staff.
- 1854 – Florence Nightingale and 38 volunteer nurses are sent to Turkey on October 21 to assist with caring for the injured of the Crimean War.
- 1854 – In a letter written November 15, 1854, to Dr Bowman, Florence Nightingale gives definite statistics:
  on Thursday last [i.e.Nov 8] we had 1715 sick and wounded in this hospital (among whom, 120 cholera patients) and 650 severely wounded in...the General Hospital...when a message came to me to prepare for 510 wounded....
  — (Seymer 1932)
- 1855 – Mary Seacole leaves London on January 31 to establish a "British Hotel" at Balaklava in the Crimea, where she nursed wounded British soldiers using herbs and practised good hygiene.
- 1856 – Biddy Mason is granted her freedom and moves to Los Angeles. She works as a nurse and midwife and becomes a successful businesswoman.
- 1856 – The Melbourne Lying-in Hospital and Infirmary for Diseases Peculiar to Women and Children was established.
- 1856 – A charitable organisation known as the Nightingale Fund for Nursing was founded in Britain, to commemorate Nightingale's work in the Crimean War.
- 1856 – Establishment of Melbourne Lying-in Hospital and Infirmary for Diseases peculiar to Women and Children.
- 1857 – Ellen Ranyard creates the first group of paid social workers in England and pioneers the first district nursing programme in London.
- 1857 – The Sisters of Charity opened the first St Vincent's Hospital in Potts Point, Sydney Australia. Today, the St Vincent's hospitals provide a considerable proportion of public health services.
- 1857 – Seacole published her autobiography, The Wonderful Adventures of Mrs Seacole in Many Lands.
- 1859 – Florence Nightingale published her views on nursing care in "Notes on Nursing". The basis of nursing practice was based on her ideas from this.

=== 1860s ===
- 1860 – In May 1860 advertisements appeared seeking young lady nurses for training, but responses were not overwhelming; however, in July 1860 15 hand-picked probationers entered the Nightingale Training School, and the pattern for modern nursing came into being.
- 1860 – Florence Nightingale publishes "Note on Nursing: What it is and what it is not"
- 1860 – Crisp et al. 2011 state that the Nightingale training school for nurses in England at the St Thomas' hospital, London was established at this time.
- 1860–1883 – As 16,000 single women emigrated to New Zealand, 582 identified their occupation as a nurse (including monthly nurse, sick nurse, trained nurse, nurse girl, midwife, hospital nurse or professional nurse.)
- 1861 – Sally Louisa Tompkins opens a hospital for Confederate soldiers in July. She is later made an officer in the army, the only woman to receive that honor.
- 1861–1865 – The American Civil War, American Army nurses corps.
- 1863 – The International Red Cross was established in Geneva, Switzerland, by five private individuals,
- 1865 – Mary Tattersall, a nurse who served in the Crimean War arrived was Timaru Hospital's first matron.
- 1867 – Jane Currie Blaikie Hoge publishes her memoirs of nursing in the Union Army, The Boys in Blue.
- 1868 – Lucy Osburn and her four Nightingale nurses arrived at Sydney Infirmary (later Sydney Hospital).
- 1868 – Sir Henry Parkes requested that Nightingale is to provide trained nurses for New South Wales.
- 1868 – Cathinka Guldberg, who had trained as a Deaconess at Kaiserswerth, started the first nursing school in Norway at the Deaconess Institute of Christiania and became its first director.

=== 1870s ===
- 1870 – New Zealand had 37 hospitals as a result of the population increase of the Gold Rush.
- 1871 – Nightingale-trained matron appointed to the Alfred Hospital, Melbourne.
- 1872–1873 – formal nursing training programs were established, establishment of formal education.
- 1873 – Linda Richards graduates from the New England Hospital for Women and Children Training School for Nurses and officially becomes America's First Trained Nurse.
- 1873 – The first nursing school in the United States, based on Florence Nightingale's principles of nursing, opens at Bellevue Hospital, New York City.
- 1874 – Group of Anglican nuns arrive in South Africa (Bloemfontein) to work as nurses. Among them was Sr. Henrietta Stockdale who started the first training for nurses in Africa.
- 1876 – The Japanese term (Kangofu 看護婦 or nurse) is used for the first time.
- 1879 – Mary Eliza Mahoney graduates from the New England Hospital for Women and Children Training School for Nurses and becomes the first black professional nurse in the U.S.

=== 1880s ===
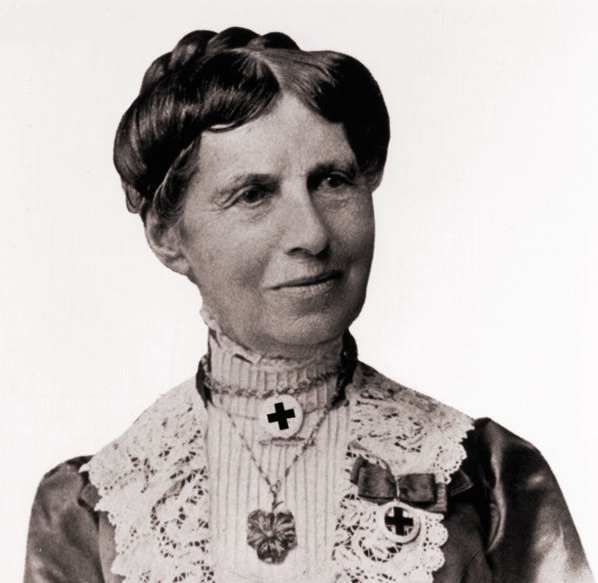
Clara Barton

- 1881 – Clara Barton becomes the first president of the American Red Cross, which she founded.
- 1881 – Created the first Portuguese Nursing School at Coimbra, Portugal.
- 1881 – Seacole died in Paddington, London.
- 1882 – The inspector of hospitals in New Zealand sent for Nightingale nurses from Britain.
- 1884 – Mary Agnes Snively, the first Ontario nurse trained according to the principles of Florence Nightingale, assumes the position of Lady Superintendent of the Toronto General Hospital's School of Nursing.
- 1885 – Following the Hospital and Charitable Aids Act, conditions improved.(MacDonald, 1990).
- 1885 – The first nurse training institute is established in Japan, thanks to the pioneering work of Linda Richards.
- 1886 – The first regular training school in India is established in Bombay, with funds provided by the governor general.
- 1886 – The Nightingale, the first American nursing journal, is published.
- 1886 – Spelman Seminary establishes the first nursing program specifically for African-Americans.
- 1888 – The monthly journal The Trained Nurse begins publication in Buffalo, New York.

=== 1890s ===
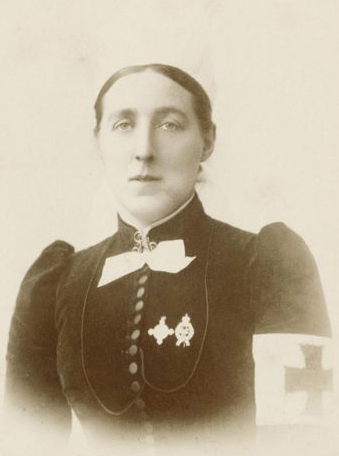
Kate Marsden

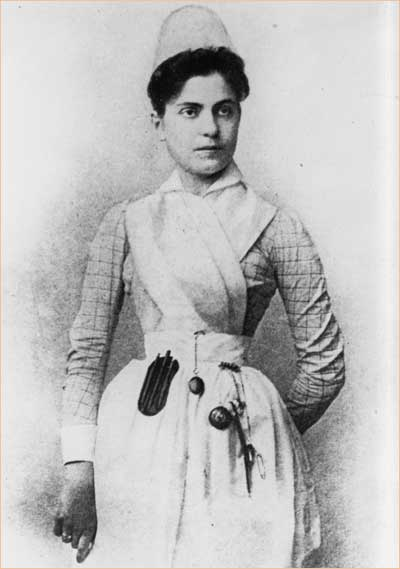
Lillian Wald

- 1890 – English nurse Kate Marsden, founder of the St. Francis Leprosy Guild, travels to Yakutia, Siberia in search of a herb reputed to cure leprosy.
- 1891 – Cape Colony establishes the first nursing registration in the British Empire.
- 1891 – Hampton University began as the Hampton Training School for Nurses in conjunction with Kings Chapel Hospital for Colored and Indian Boys and the Abbey Mae Infirmary. This school was started on the campus of Hampton Institute at Strawberry Banks in what is now the City of Hampton, Virginia. On this campus sits the Emancipation Oak, the site of the first reading of the Emancipation Proclamation in the South. Alice Bacon was instrumental in starting the Hampton Training School for Nurses. The school was commonly called Dixie Hospital, now known as the Sentara Hampton CarePlex, and its first graduate was Anna DeCosta Banks. Elnora D. Daniel, the first black nurse to serve as the president of a university [Chicago State University] was Dean of Hampton University School of Nursing in the 1980s.
- 1891 – Daniel Hale Williams founds Provident Hospital in Chicago, Illinois, the first interracial hospital and training school for black nurses and interns.
- 1893 – Lillian Wald, the founder of the Visiting Nurse Service of New York in the U.S. begins teaching a home class on nursing for Lower East Side (New York) women after a trying time at an orphanage where children were maltreated.
- 1893 – The Nightingale Pledge, composed by Lystra Gretter, is first used by the graduating class at the old Harper Hospital in Detroit, Michigan in the spring.
- 1893 – Ellen Dougherty (later New Zealand's and the world's first registered nurse) began working as matron of Palmerston North Hospital.
- 1893 - Rebecca Strong started the first training school for nurses at Glasgow Royal Infirmary, based on Nightingale's model, and her methods were later widely adopted by the profession.
- 1897 – The American Nurses Association holds its first meeting in February as the "Associated Alumnae of Trained Nurses of the United States and Canada".
- 1897 – Jane Delano becomes Superintendent of Bellevue Hospital.
- 1899 – Japan establishes a licensing system for modern nursing professionals with the introduction of the Midwives Ordinance.
- 1899 – Anna E. Turner goes to Cuba on a cattle boat with nine other nurses to serve two years at a yellow fever hospital in Havana.
- 1899 – The International Council of Nurses is formed.
- 1899 – The Australasian Trained Nurses' Association is founded in New South Wales.
- 1899–1902 – During the 1899–1902 South African Boer War, nurses from Canada, Australia, and New Zealand serve as private citizens or with the British nursing forces.

== 20th century ==
=== 1900s ===
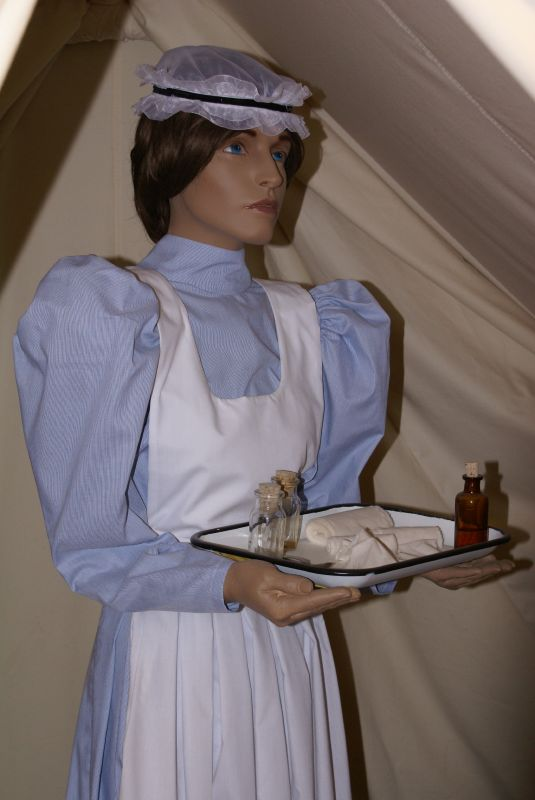
French nurse's uniform, 1900

- 1900 – Dame Agnes Gwendoline Hunt, the founder of orthopaedic nursing, opens a convalescent home for crippled children at Florence House in Baschurch which espouses the yet-unproven theory of open-air treatment.
- 1901 – United States Army Nurse Corps (NC) is established
- 1901 – New Zealand is the first country to regulate nurses nationally, with adoption of the Nurses Registration Act.
- 1901 – State registration for nurses began in New Zealand.
- 1902 – Ellen Dougherty of New Zealand becomes the first registered nurse in the world.
- 1902 – New York City Board of Education hires Lina Rogers Struthers as North America's first school nurse.
- 1902 – Queen Alexandra's Imperial Military Nursing Service replaces, by royal warrant, the Army Nursing Service.
- 1903 – The Armstrong Act of 1903 is passed in New York, requiring registration of nurses.
- 1905 – The Spanish–American War Nurses Memorial is erected at Arlington National Cemetery in the United States.
- 1906 – The first nursing school Union Mission Hospital Training School for Nurses/Iloilo Mission Hospital training school for Nurses, now Central Philippine University–College of Nursing, is established in the Philippines.
- 1906 – Severance School opens in Korea, the first of many training schools.
- 1908 – The United States Navy Nurse Corps is established.
- 1908 – The New Zealand Nurses Organisation's journal, Kai Tiaki was first published.
- 1908 – Representatives of 16 organized nursing bodies meet in Ottawa to form the Canadian National Association of Trained Nurses, which will become the Canadian Nurses Association in 1911.
- 1908 – Akenehi Hei registered as the first Maori nurse.
- 1909 – The New Zealand Trained Nurses Association was established.
- 1909 – The American Red Cross Nursing Service is formed.
- 1909 – The University of Minnesota School of Nursing bestows the first bachelor's degree in nursing, setting a new standard in the training of nurses.

=== 1910s ===
Edith Cavell

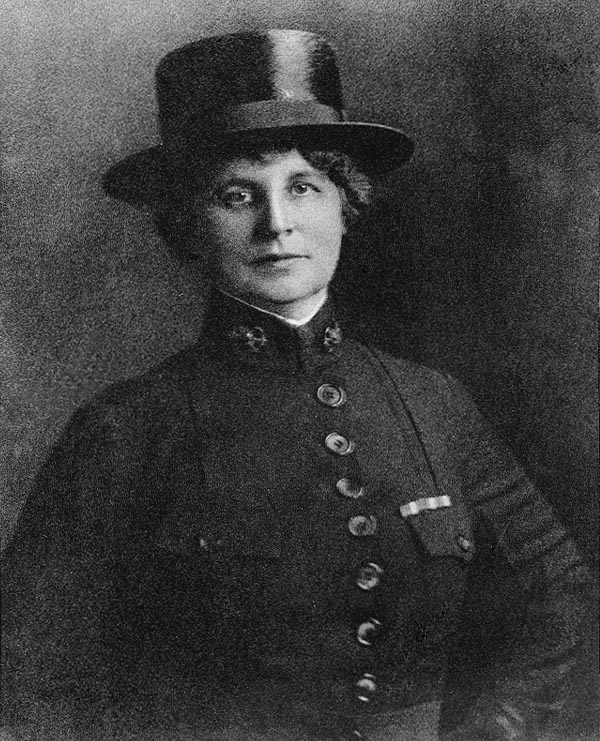
Chief Nurse Higbee, USN

- 1910 – Florence Nightingale dies on 13 August at the age of 90.
- 1910 – Akenehi Hei, the first qualified Maori Nurse in New Zealand dies on November 28, 1910, after contracting typhoid from family members.
- 1914 – New Zealand Nurses worked alongside the British, Australian, American and Canadian nurses in World War I.
- 1915 – Edith Cavell is executed by a German firing squad on October 12 for helping hundreds of Allied soldiers escape to the Netherlands.
- 1915 – The New Zealand Army Nursing Service set up in 1915, largely at the urging of Hester Maclean (1863–1932).
- 1915 – 10 New Zealand nurses killed when SS Marquette torpedoed in Aegean Sea.
- 1916 – The Royal College of Nursing is founded.
- 1917 – Mrs. Annie Kamauoha is recognized as Hawaii's first graduate nurse from the Queen's Hospital Training School for Nurses. Her pin was designed by Queen Liliuokalani and was presented to her by the queen before the queen died later that year.
- 1917 – Standardized curriculum established by the National League for Nursing Education.
- 1918 – Lenah Higbee is awarded the Navy Cross for distinguished service in the line of her profession and unusual and conspicuous devotion to duty as superintendent of the U.S. Navy Nurse Corps. She is the first living woman to receive this honor.
- 1918 – Frances Reed Elliot is enrolled as the first African–American in the American Red Cross Nursing Service on July 2.
- 1919 – The UK passes the Nursing Act of 1919, which provides for registration of nurses. The first name entered in the register as SRN 001 was Ethel Gordon Fenwick.

=== 1920s ===
- 1921 – Sophie Mannerheim, a pioneer of modern nursing in Finland, accepts the chairmanship of the Finnish Red Cross.
- 1922 – Filipino Nurses Association was founded. The FNA was admitted as member of the International Council of Nurses (ICN) in 1929. The FNA which was renamed Philippine Nurses Association (PNA) in 1962 continues to uphold its vision to uplift the ideals and spirit of the nursing profession in the country and to win for the profession the respect and recognition of the international community
- 1923 – The Nursing Act of 1919 becomes effective and Ethel Gordon Fenwick is the first nurse registered in the UK.
- 1923 – Yale School of Nursing becomes the first school of nursing to adopt the Rockefeller Commission recommendations for curriculum was based on an educational plan rather than on hospital service needs.
- 1923 – Mary Breckinridge, the founder of the Frontier Nursing Service, travels 700 miles on horseback surveying the health needs of rural Kentuckians.
- 1923 – The first Brazilian higher education institution of nursing, named after nursing pioneer Ana Néri, is launched in Rio de Janeiro by Carlos Chagas, aiming at implementing the "Nightingale model" nationwide.
- 1925 – New Zealand attempted to have a nursing programme available at the University of Otago. (Crisp, Taylor, Douglas & Rebeiro, 2013)
- 1926 – 20 July New Zealands's first sister was appointed by the board at Auckland hospital New Zealand.
- 1929 – The Japanese Nursing Association is established.

=== 1930s ===
- 1931 – The Forgotten Frontier, a documentary about the Frontier Nursing Service in Kentucky, is filmed.
- 1933 – Australian Capital Territory nursing registration commenced.
- 1937 – Sister Elizabeth Kenny publishes her first book, Infantile Paralysis and Cerebral Diplegia: Method of Restoration of Function.
- 1938 – The Nurses Memorial in Arlington National Cemetery is erected in Section 21 (the "Nurses Section") to honor nurses who served in the armed forces during World War I. Over 600 nurses are buried at Arlington.
- 1939 – Registering of nursing aides commenced in New Zealand

=== World War II ===
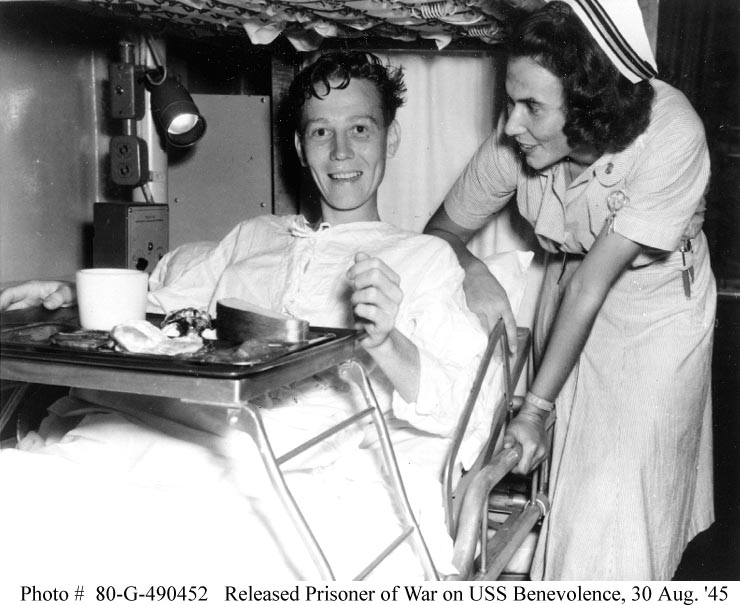
U.S. Navy Nurse and released POW aboard USS Benevolence, 1945.

- 1939–1945 – Military and naval nurses from numerous countries serve outside their countries.
- 1941–45 – Over 59,000 American women serve in the U.S. Army Nurse Corps
- 1941–45 – Over 11,000 women serve in the United States Navy Nurse Corps
- 1942 – Banka Island massacre: Twenty one Australian nurses, survivors of a bombed and sunken ship, are executed by bayonet or machine gun by Imperial Japanese Army soldiers on February 16.
- 1943 – 11 Australian Army nurses killed when hospital ship Centaur torpedoed off Queensland.
- Australian Army Medical Women's Service (AAMWS) operates 1942 until 1951. Its nurses serve in military hospitals in the Middle East, Australia and, with the British Commonwealth Occupation Force, in Japan. In 1951, it merged into the Royal Australian Army Nursing Corps

=== 1940s ===
- 1942 – Beveridge Report recommends comprehensive health care funded through National Insurance.
- 1943 – Mary Elizabeth Lancaster (Carnegie) is appointed the acting director of the Division of Nursing Education at Hampton Institute in Hampton, Virginia. Through her direction the first baccalaureate nursing program in the Commonwealth of Virginia is created.
- 1943 – The Mid-Atlantic state of Delaware was the first to admit the African American nurses to membership as a state nurses.
- 1944 – Ludwig Guttmanns Spinal Unit at Stoke Mandeville was formally opened on 1 February with one patient and twenty-six beds.
- 1944 – The first baccalaureate nursing program in the Commonwealth of Virginia is created at the Hampton University School of Nursing.
- 1948– The first baccalaureate nursing program in the State of Alabama is established at Tuskegee University under the leadership of Dr. Lillian H. Harvey, Dean.
- 1948 – The National Health Service is launched on July 5.
- 1949 – Mary Elizabeth Carnegie is the first black person elected to the board of the Florida Nurses Association with the right to speak and vote.
- 1949 – Formation of College of Nursing Australia.

=== 1950s ===
- 1950-1953 - Korean War: 1500 nurses are the only female members of the US Army allowed on the Korean peninsula, serving in MASH units near the front lines.
- 1951 – The National Association of Colored Graduate Nurses merges with the American Nurses Association.
- 1951 – Males join the United Kingdom same register of nurses as females for the first time.
- 1951 – National Association for Practical Nurse Education and Service (NAPNES) along with professional nursing organizations and the U.S. Department of Education created Vocational Nursing standards for education and the LPN / LVN level of nursing was created in the United States.
- 1952 – The introduction of sedatives transforms mental health nursing.
- 1952 – Hildegard Peplau presents Interpersonal Relations Theory.
- 1952 - 2nd Lt. Nurse Abbie Sweetwine of 494th Medical Group of the United States Air Force ran triage at the Harrow and Wealdstone rail crash based on her military field experience. The success of the team's response is credited with inspiring the development of the use of paramedics in Britain.
- 1953 – The National Students Nurses' Association (NSNA) is established.
- 1954 – One of the first PhD programs in nursing is offered at the University of Pittsburgh.
- 1955 – Elizabeth Lipford Kent becomes the first African American to earn a PhD in nursing.
- 1955 – The United States Army Nurse Corps ceases to be all-female when Edward L.T. Lyon receives his commission.
- 1956 – The Columbia University School of Nursing is the first in the U.S. to grant a master's degree in a clinical nursing specialty.
- 1956 – The University of Edinburgh Nurse Teaching Unit established as the first nurse teaching unit in a British university.

=== 1960s ===
- 1960 – The first Neonatal Intensive Care Unit was established.
- 1960 – The Nursing Studies department at the University of Edinburgh initiates the first degree in nursing.
- 1963 – Ruby Bradley retires from the U.S. Army Nurse Corps with 34 medals and citations for bravery.
- 1964 – Daphne Steele becomes the first Black Matron in the NHS.
- 1965 – The establishment of the first nurse practitioner (NP) role, developed jointly by a nurse educator and a physician at the University of Colorado.
- 1965 – The United States Navy Nurse Corps was all-female until 1965.
- 1965 – A Japanese court rules on the regulation regarding night shifts of nurses, limiting them to 8 days a month and banning single-person night shifts altogether.
- 1966 – The Filipino Nurses Association was renamed as The Philippine Nurses Association
- 1967 – The Salmon Report recommends the reorganisation of the NHS management, ultimately leading to the abolishment of matrons
- 1967 – Termination of pregnancy becomes legal in the United Kingdom under the Abortion Act 1967.
- 1967 – Dame Cicely Saunders sets up the first hospice in a suburb of London.
- 1967 – Luther Christman becomes first male dean of a nursing school in the United States.
- 1967 – New Zealand nursing undergo changes from being hospital-based apprenticeships to tertiary education institutions.

=== 1970s ===
- 1971 – The Carpenter report was released, this was a review released by New Zealand centered around the nursing education system, the report advocated training nurses in an educational environment. The government however decided that polytechs not universities were more appropriate for this, however the consequences of this were that nurses were only diploma level not degree level.
- 1973 – Christchurch and Wellington Polytechnics offer diploma-level nursing education; Massey and Victoria Universities (Wellington) start their post-registration bachelor's degrees.
- 1974 – Yale Nursing School dean Florence Wald et al. found Connecticut Hospice, launching the hospice movement in the U.S.
- 1974 – The classic definition of health which has endured for many years, was actually provided by the World Health Organization.
- 1975 – First nursing diploma program in Australia in a College of Advanced Education (CAE) in Melbourne, followed quickly by programs in New South Wales, South Australia and Western Australia.
- 1976 – The first master's degree program in nursing for a historically Black College or University (HBCU) founded at Hampton University School of Nursing.
- 1976 – The Nurses' Health Study began
- 1976 – Roy Adaptation Theory published, Sister Callista Roy nursing theorist
- 1977 – The M. Elizabeth Carnegie Nursing Archives is created by Dr. Patricia E. Sloan at the Hampton University School of Nursing. This is the only repository for memorabilia on minority nurses in the United States. The focus of the archives is African American nurses.
- 1978 – Estelle Massey Osborne becomes the first black nurse to be inducted as honorary fellow in the American Academy of Nursing.
- 1978 – Barbara Nichols is the first black nurse to be elected president of the American Nurses Association.
- 1978 – Elizabeth Carnegie is the first black to be elected president of the American Academy of Nursing.
- 1979 – The first iteration of a clinical doctorate, a nursing doctorate (ND), was established at Case Western Reserve University.
- 1979 – Dr. Watson's first book published, based on her theory of caring.

=== 1980s ===
- 1980s – In the U.S. the MSN degree became the required degree for advanced practice nurse certification. Nurse Practitioners with certificates were grandfathered in. The American Association of Nurse Anesthetists (AANA) first required a master's degree in order to sit for the boards in 1999.
- 1980 – Viola Davis Brown of Kentucky is the first African American nurse to lead a state office of public health nursing in the United States
- 1980 – The Roper, Logan and Tierney model of nursing, based upon the activities of daily living, is published.
- 1982 – Florence Nightingale Trust was created where they had Florence Nightingales letters, artifacts and publications made viewable to the public and protected at the 'Florence Nightingale Museum'.
- 1983 – The first edition of Modeling and Role-Modeling: A Theory and Paradigm for Nursing by Helen Erickson, Evelyn Tomlin and Mary Ann Swain was published, arguing for the client as the primary source of information and the client's worldview as essential data for nursing practice.
- 1983 – The importance of human rights in nursing is made explicit in a statement adopted by the International Council of Nurses.
- 1983 – UKCC becomes the profession's new regulatory body in the UK.
- 1984 – Under the Australian federal government plan, tertiary education for all Australian nurses was adopted.
- 1985 – Miss Virginia Henderson is presented with the first Christianne Reimann Prize by the International Council of Nurses in June.
- 1988 – Anne Casey develops her child-centered nursing model while working as a paediatric oncology nurse in London.
- 1989 – Nurses' Health Study 2 begins.

=== 1990s ===
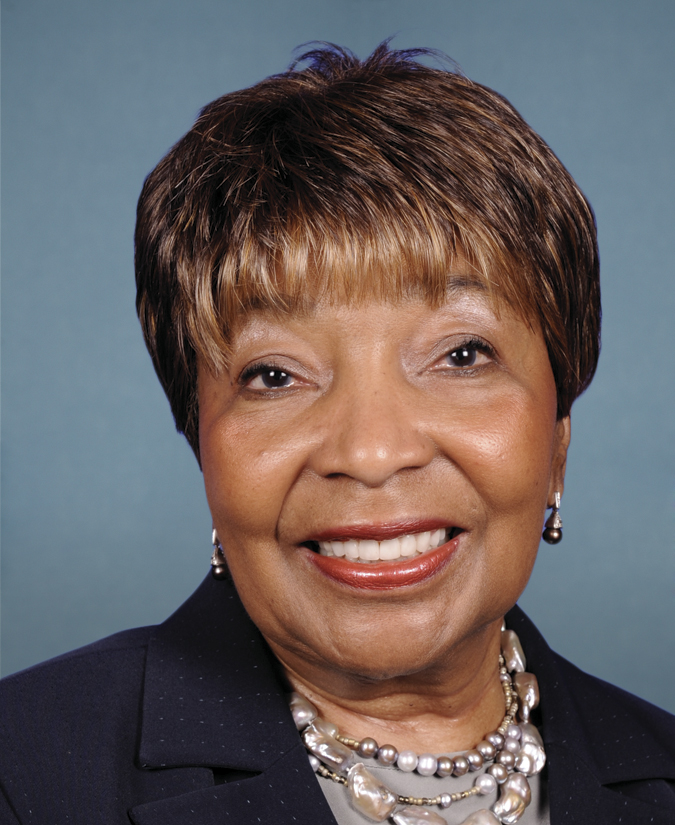
Rep. Eddie Bernice Johnson

- 1990 – Florence Nightingale's birthday (May 12) is declared the official Nursing Day in Japan.
- 1992 – Eddie Bernice Johnson is the first nurse elected to the U.S. Congress.
- 1993 – After reforms in 1993, nursing education in Sweden is changing from vocational training to academic education.
- 1999 – Elnora D. Daniel is the first black nurse elected president of a major university, Chicago State University.
- 1999 – The first doctor of philosophy degree program in nursing for a Historically Black College or University (HBCU) is founded at Hampton University School of Nursing. This doctoral program is unique in that it is the only doctoral program in the country that focuses on family and family-related nursing research.
- 1999 –
  I define caring as a "nurturing way of relating to a valued 'other' toward whom one feels a personal sense of commitment and responsibility"
  — (Swanson 1991), page 162
- 1999 – 9-day strike of nurses and midwives in Ireland.

== 21st century ==
=== 2000s ===
- 2002 – The Nursing and Midwifery Council takes over from the UKCC as the UK's regulatory body.
- 2003 – Primary Health Care framework document is released by New Zealand Ministry of Health.
- 2004 – The American Association of Colleges of Nursing (AACN) recommends that all advanced practice nurses earn a Doctor of Nursing Practice degree.
- 2004 – The New Zealand Health Practitioners Competence Assurance (2003) Act comes into full power on 18 September. This covers the requirements for nurses to have current competences relating to their scope of practice.
- 2004 – The National Council of State Boards of Nursing initiated its Nursing License Compact which allows an RN who holds a license in one Compact state (USA), to work in another Compact state without having that state's license. (As of 2015 there are twenty-four Compact states and four with pending legislation to join.)
- 2007 – ICN Conference is held in Yokohama
- 2008 – Courtney Lyder becomes the first male minority dean of a nursing school in the United States.
- 2008 – National Council for State Boards of Nursing (NCSBN) issues final report: "NCSBN Consensus Model for APRN Regulation: Licensure, Accreditation, Certification & Education".
- 2009 – Carnegie Foundation releases the results of its study of nursing education, "Educating Nurses: A Call for Radical Transformation".
- 2010 – Institute for the Future of Nursing (IFN) releases evidence-based recommendations to lead change for improved health care.
- 2010 – A national registration for all nurses and midwives came into force in Australia in July.

== See also ==
- Timeline of nursing history in Australia and New Zealand
- Nursing
- History of medicine
- History of hospitals
- History of nursing
- List of nurses
- List of African-American women in medicine

== Sources ==
- Andersson, E P (1999). "From Vocational Training to Academic Education: The Situation of the Schools of Nursing in Sweden". J Nurs Educ. 38 (1): 33–38. doi:10.3928/0148-4834-19990101-10. PMID 9921786.
- Barber, L.; Towers, R. (1976). "Wellington Hospital 1847–1976". Giselle's Journal.
- Bloy, Marjie (3 January 2012). "Florence Nightingale (1820–1910)".
- Bullough; Bullough (1969). The Emergence of Modern Nursing.
- Craven, R. F.; Hirnle, C. J. (2011). Fundamentals of Nursing, Human Health and Function (7th ed.).
- D'Antonio, Patricia (2010). American Nursing: A History of Knowledge, Authority, and the Meaning of Work. Johns Hopkins University Press. ISBN 978-0801895647.
- Davies, Celia, ed. (1980) Rewriting Nursing History
- Dinan, Susan E. (2006). Women and Poor Relief in Seventeenth-Century France. The Early History of the Daughters of Charity. Ashgate / Routledge. ISBN 978-0754655534.
- Dingwall, Robert, Anne Marie Rafferty, Charles Webster (1988) An Introduction to the Social History of Nursing (Routledge)
- Dock, Lavinia Lloyd (1920) A Short history of nursing from the earliest times to the present dayfull text online; abbreviated version of her four volume A History of Nursing vol 3 online
- Donahue, M. Patricia (2010) Nursing, The Finest Art: An Illustrated History (3rd ed.) excerpt and text search
- Fairman, Julie and Joan E. Lynaugh (2000) Critical Care Nursing: A History excerpt and text search
- Mitchell, Paula R.; Grippando, Gloria M. (1992). Nursing Perspectives and Issues (5th ed.). Cengage Learning. ISBN 978-0827349834.
- Judd, Deborah. (2009) A History of American Nursing: Trends and Eras excerpt and text search
- Lewenson, Sandra B. (2004). "Integrating nursing history into the curriculum". Journal of Professional Nursing. 20 (6): 374–380. doi:10.1016/j.profnurs.2004.08.003. PMID 15599871. "History was always part of the curriculum but declined in emphasis and time dedicated to it"
- Lewenson, Sandra B., and Eleanor Krohn Herrmann (2007) Capturing Nursing History: A Guide to Historical Methods in Research
- Masson, M. (1985). A pictorial history nf Nursing. Hamlyn. ISBN 978-0600500629.
- Snodgrass, Mary Ellen (2004) Historical Encyclopedia of Nursing from ancient times to the present

=== Britain and Commonwealth ===
- Adlam, K.; Dotchin, M.; Hayward, S. (2009). "Nursing first year of practice, past, present and future: documenting the journey in New Zealand". Journal of Nursing Management. 17 (5): 570–575. doi:10.1111/j.1365-2834.2008.00932.x. PMID 19575715.
- Bostridge. Mark (2008) Florence Nightingale: The Making of an Icon
- Brown, Gary B; Greaney, Anna-Marie; Kelly-Fitzgibbon, Mary E; McCarthy, Jane (2006). "The 1999 Irish nurses' strike: nursing versions of the strike and self-identity in a general hospital". Journal of Advanced Nursing. 56 (2): 200–208. doi:10.1111/j.1365-2648.2006.03998.x. PMID 17018068.
- Brown, M.; Masters, D.; Smith, B. (1994). Nurses of Auckland : the history of the general nursing programme in the Auckland School of Nursing. Auckland, NZ. ISBN 978-0473028275.
- Chick, Norma; Rodgers, Jan A, eds. (1997). Looking back, moving forward : essays in the history of New Zealand nursing and midwifery. Palmerston North, NZ: Massey University, Dept. of Nursing and Midwifery. ISBN 978-0473047542.
- Clarke, Jean; O'Neill, Catherine S (2001). "An Analysis of How The Irish Times Portrayed Irish Nursing During the 1999 Strike". Nurs Ethics. 8 (4): 350–359. doi:10.1177/096973300100800407. PMID 16004089. S2CID 36692426.
- Crisp, J.; Taylor, C; Douglas, C.; Rebeiro, G., eds. (2012). Potter & Perry's Fundamentals of Nursing (4th ANZ ed.). Mosby. ISBN 978-0729541107.
- Daly, J.; Speedy, S.; Jackson, D. (2014). Contexts of Nursing (4th ed.). Churchill Livingstone. ISBN 978-0729541527.
- Helmstadter, Carol, and Judith Godden, eds. (2011) Nursing before Nightingale, 1815–1899 (Ashgate)
- Kellaway, J.; Maryan, M. (1993). A century of care: Palmerston North Hospital 1893–1993. Double Bay, NSW: Focus. ISBN 978-0473021825.
- Loots, I.; Vermaak, M. (1975). Pioneers of professional nursing in South Africa. Bloemfontein: de Villiers. ISBN 978-0796400055.
- McLauchlan, G., ed. (1989). The illustrated encyclopedia of New Zealand. Auckland: Bateman. ISBN 978-1869530075.
- Middleton, J. (2008) NHS nursing in the 1950s. NursingTimes.net. Retrieved from http://www.nursingtimes.net/nhs-nursing-in-the-1950s/461928.article
- Nelson, Sioban, and Ann Marie Rafferty, eds. (2010) Notes on Nightingale: The Influence and Legacy of a Nursing Icon
- Papps, E. (2012). "Legal implications in nursing practice: New Zealand". In Crisp, J.; Taylor, C; Douglas, C.; Rebeiro, G. (eds.). Potter & Perry's Fundamentals of Nursing (4th ANZ ed.). Mosby. ISBN 978-0729541107.
- Seymer, Lucy R. (1932). A general history of nursing. Faber and Faber.
- Sweet, Helen (2007). "Establishing Connections, Restoring Relationships: Exploring the Historiography of Nursing in Britain". Gender and History. 19 (3): 565–580. doi:10.1111/j.1468-0424.2007.00490.x. S2CID 145247963.

=== U.S. ===
- Alligood, Martha Raile; Marriner-Tomey, Ann (2009). Alligood, Martha R.; Tomey, Anne M. (eds.). Nursing theorists and their work. ISBN 978-0323056410.
- Campbell, D'Ann (1984) Women at War with America: Private Lives in a Patriotic Era ch 2, on military nurses in World War Two
- Judd, Deborah (2009) A History of American Nursing: Trends and Eras excerpt and text search
- Kalisch, Philip Arthur, and Beatrice J. Kalisch (2003)[1986] The Advance of American Nursing (2nd ed.); retitled as American Nursing: A History (4th ed.)
- Parker, M. E.; Smith, M. C. (2010). Nursing Theories and nursing practice (3rd ed.). Philadelphia, PA: F.A. Davis Co.
- Potter, Patricia A.; Perry, Anne Griffin; Stockert, Patricia; Hall, Amy (2012). Fundamentals of Nursing (8th ed.). Mosby. ISBN 978-0323079334.
- Rodgers, Jan. A. (1994). A Paradox of Power and Marginality: New Zealand Nurses' Professional Campaign During War 1900–1920 (Ph.D.). Massey University.
- Sarnecky, Mary T. (1999) A history of the U.S. Army Nurse Corps
- Wesley, Ruby L. (1995). Nursing theories and models (2nd ed.). Springhouse Pub Co. ISBN 978-0874347449.
- Wojnar, D. (2009). "Florence Nightingale". In Alligood, Martha R.; Tomey, Anne M. (eds.). Nursing theorists and their work. pp. 71–90. ISBN 978-0323056410.
