= Nursing theory =

Conceptual model for the practice of nursing

Nursing theory is defined as "a creative and conscientious structuring of ideas that project a tentative, purposeful, and systematic view of phenomena". Through systematic inquiry in research and practice, nursing theory helps organize knowledge to improve patient care. In general terms, theory refers to a coherent set of concepts and propositions used to explain phenomena.

== Importance ==
Early nursing had limited formalized knowledge. As nurse education developed, the need to systematize knowledge led to the development of nursing theory to help nurses evaluate increasingly complex care situations.

Nursing theories provide a reflective framework to guide assessment, decision-making, and evaluation in practice. As new situations are encountered, this framework provides an arrangement for management, investigation and decision-making. Nursing theories also administer a structure for communicating with other nurses and with other representatives and members of the health care team. Nursing theories assist the development of nursing in formulating beliefs, values and goals. They help to define the different particular contribution of nursing with the care of clients. Nursing theory guides research and practice.

== Borrowed and shared theories ==
Not all theories in nursing are unique nursing theories; many are borrowed or shared with other disciplines. Theories developed by Neuman, Watson, Parse, Orlando and Peplau are considered unique to nursing. Theories and concepts that originated in related sciences have been borrowed by nurses to explain and explore phenomena specific to nursing.

== Types ==
=== Grand nursing theories ===
Grand nursing theories have the broadest scope and present general concepts and propositions. Theories at this level may both reflect and provide insights useful for practice but are not designed for empirical testing. This limits the use of grand nursing theories for directing, explaining, and predicting nursing in particular situations. However, these theories may include concepts that lend themselves to empirical testing. Theories at this level are intended to be pertinent to all instances of nursing. Grand theories consist of conceptual frameworks defining broad perspectives for practice and ways of looking at nursing phenomena based on the perspectives.

=== Mid-range nursing theories ===
Middle-range nursing theories are narrower in scope than grand nursing theories and offer an effective bridge between grand nursing theories and nursing practice. They present concepts and a lower level of abstraction and guide theory-based research and nursing practice strategies. One of the hallmarks of mid-range theory compared to grand theories is that mid-range theories are more tangible and verifiable through testing. The functions of middle-range theories include describing, explaining, or predicting phenomena. Middle-range theories are generally more concrete than grand theories and consider a limited number of variables and a narrower aspect of reality.

=== Nursing practice theories ===
Nursing practice theories have the most limited scope and level of abstraction and are developed for use within a specific range of nursing situations. Nursing practice theories provide frameworks for nursing interventions, and predict outcomes and the impact of nursing practice. The capacity of these theories is limited, and analyzes a narrow aspect of a phenomenon. Nursing practice theories are usually defined to an exact community or discipline.

== Nursing models ==
Nursing models are usually described as a representation of reality or a more simple way of organising a complex phenomenon. The nursing model is a consolidation of both concepts and the assumption that combine them into a meaningful arrangement. A model is a way of presenting a situation in such a way that it shows the logical terms in order to showcase the structure of the original idea. The term nursing model cannot be used interchangeably with nursing theory.

=== Components of nursing modeling ===
There are three main key components to a nursing model:

- Statement of goal that the nurse is trying to achieve
- Set of beliefs and values
- Awareness, skills and knowledge the nurse needs to practice.

The first important step in development of ideas about nursing is to establish the body approach essential to nursing, then to analyse the beliefs and values around those.

=== Common concepts of nursing modeling: a metaparadigm ===
A metaparadigm contains philosophical worldviews and concepts that are unique to a discipline and defines boundaries that separate it from other disciplines. A metaparadigm is intended to help guide others to conduct research and utilize the concepts for academia within that discipline. The nursing metaparadigm consists of four main concepts: person, health, environment, and nursing.

- The person (Patient)
- The environment
- Health
- Nursing (Goals, Roles Functions)

Each theory is regularly defined and described by a nursing theorist. The main focal point of nursing out of the four various common concepts is the person (patient).

== Notable nursing theorists and theories ==
- Alison J. Tierney, Nancy Roper, Winifred W. Logan: Roper-Logan-Tierney model of nursing
- Anne Casey: Casey's model of nursing
- Betty Neuman: Neuman systems model
- Callista Roy: Adaptation model of nursing
- Carl O. Helvie: Helvie energy theory of nursing and health
- Dorothea Orem: Self-care deficit nursing theory
- Faye Abdellah: 21 Nursing Problems Theory
- Alison Kitson, Kerry Kuluski, Louise Locock, Renee Lyons, Tiffany Conroy: Fundamentals of Care (FoC)
- Helen Erickson: Modeling and Role Modeling Theory
- Hildegard Peplau: Theory of interpersonal relations
- Imogene King: Theory of Goal Attainment
- Isabel Hampton Robb: Nursing Education
- Jean Watson: The Theory of Human Caring
- Kari Martinsen: Adequate care must involve both objective observation and perceptive response.
- Katharine Kolcaba: Theory of Comfort
- Katie Love: Empowered Holistic Nursing Education
- Madeleine Leininger: Transcultural Nursing Theory
- Margaret Newman: Health as Expanding Consciousness
- Marie Manthey: Primary Nursing
- Martha E. Rogers: Science of unitary human beings
- Phil Barker: Tidal Model
- Ramona T Mercer: Maternal role attainment theory
- Virginia Henderson: Henderson's need theory

Purposely omitted from this list is Florence Nightingale. Nightingale never actually formulated a theory of nursing science but was posthumously accredited with formulating some by others who categorized her personal journaling and communications into a theoretical framework.

Also not included are the many nurses who improved on these theorists' ideas without developing their own theoretical vision.

== Emerging Nursing Theorists ==
New ideas are bound to emerge as the path has been set by notable nursing theorists. While some of these theories are still evolving, they have the potential to soon shape the future of nursing practice.

- Afaf Meleis: Transitions Theory

A middle-range nursing theory addressing the process of navigating life changes and health challenges. The theory emphasizes the nurse's role in helping others to positively adapt to change, prepare them for transitions, and secure their well-being. Transitions are seen as processes with stages influenced by various factors and supported through intervention strategies. This theory can be applied in developmental, situational, health-related, and organizational situations.

== See also ==
- Nursing
- Nursing assessment
- Nursing process
- Nursing research
