= NSQ =

NSQ or nsq may refer to:

- Nursing Science Quarterly, a quarterly peer-reviewed academic journal that publishes papers in the field of nursing
- NSQ, the IATA code for Nuussuaq Heliport, Greenland
- nsq, the ISO 639-3 code for Northern Sierra Miwok, California, United States
