= Philip Barker =

Philip (or Phillip) Barker may refer to:

- Philip A. Barker (1920–2001), British archaeologist
- Phillip Barker (film director) (born 1955), Canadian film director
- Philip Barker-Webb (1793–1854), English botanist
- Phil Barker (born 1932), British war games designer and pioneer
- M. A. R. Barker (Phillip Barker, 1929–2012), American professor of Urdu and South Asian Studies
- Phil Barker, British professor, creator of the Tidal Model
