= Elnora =

Elnora can refer to:

In places

- Elnora, Alberta, in Red Deer County, Alberta, Canada
- Elnora, Indiana, in Daviess County, Indiana, United States

In people

- Elnora Monroe Babcock (1852–1934), American suffragist
- Elnora D. Daniel (1941–2024), American nurse and academic administrator
