= Nightingale Pledge =

Modified version of the Hippocratic Oath

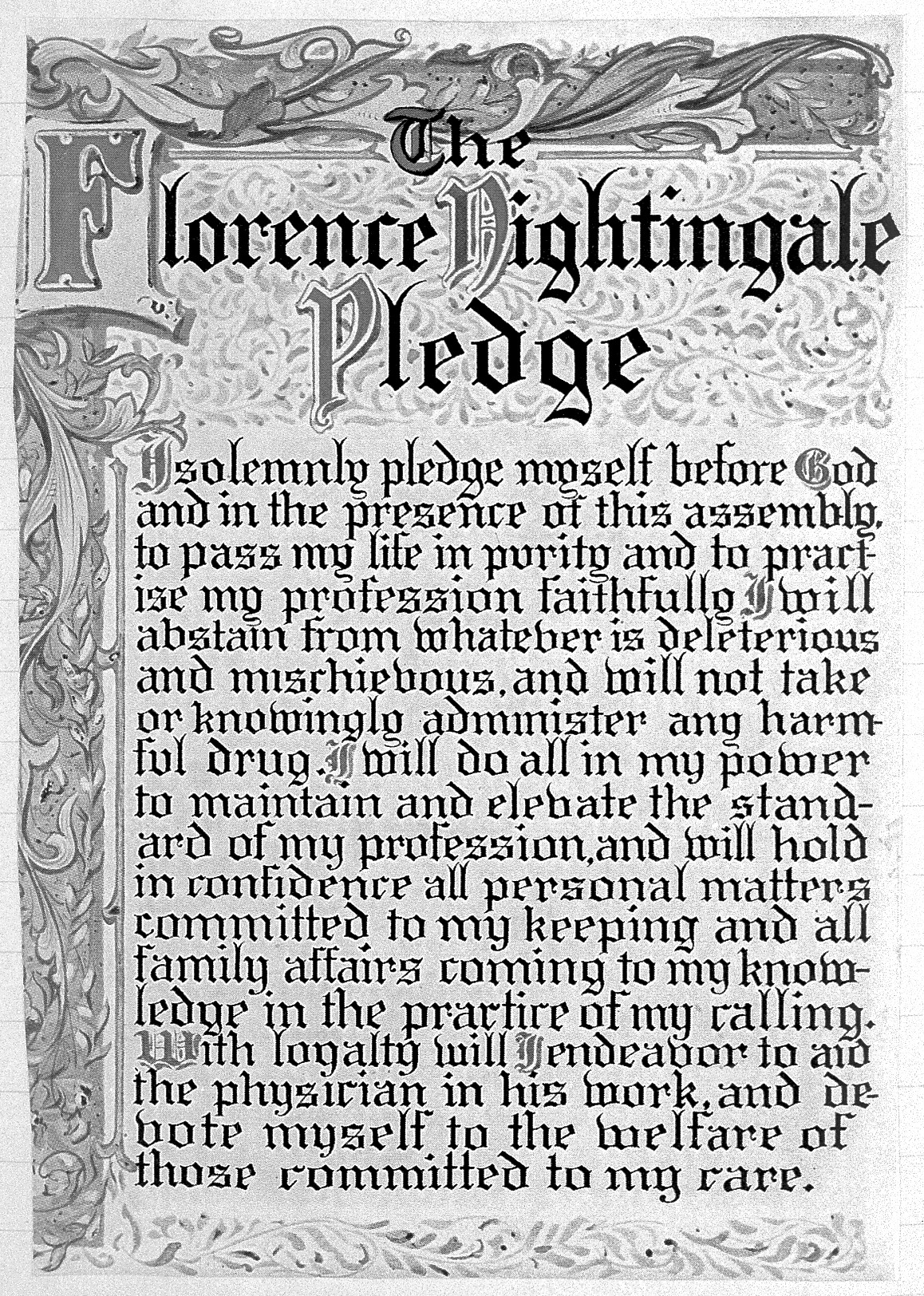
The Nightingale Pledge

The Nightingale Pledge, named in honour of Florence Nightingale, is a modified version of the Hippocratic Oath. Lystra Gretter and a Committee for the Farrand Training School Grace for Nurses in Detroit, Michigan created the pledge in 1893. Gretter, inspired by the work of Nightingale, the founder of modern nursing, credited the pledge to the work of her committee, but was herself considered "the moving spirit behind the idea" for the pledge.

The Nightingale Pledge is a statement of the ethics and principles of the nursing profession in the United States, and it is not used outside the US. It included a vow to "abstain from whatever is deleterious and mischievous" and to "zealously seek to nurse those who are ill wherever they may be and whenever they are in need." In a 1935 revision to the pledge, Gretter widened the role of the nurse by including an oath to become a "missioner of health" dedicated to the advancement of "human welfare"—an expansion of nurses' bedside focus to an approach that encompassed public health.

US nurses have recited the pledge at pinning ceremonies for decades. In recent years, many US nursing schools have made changes to the original or 1935 versions, often removing the "loyalty to physicians" phrasing to promote a more independent nursing profession, with its own particular ethical standards.

== Versions ==
Original "Florence Nightingale Pledge":

I solemnly pledge myself before God and in the presence of this assembly to pass my life in purity and to practise my profession faithfully.
I shall abstain from whatever is deleterious and mischievous, and shall not take or knowingly administer any harmful drug.
I shall do all in my power to maintain and elevate the standard of my profession and will hold in confidence all personal matters committed to my keeping and all family affairs coming to my knowledge in the practice of my calling.
I shall be loyal to my work and devoted towards the welfare of those committed to my care.

1935 revised version (changes from original italicized):

I solemnly pledge myself before God and in the presence of this assembly to pass my life in purity and to practise my profession faithfully.
I will abstain from whatever is deleterious and mischievous, and will not take or knowingly administer any harmful drug.
I will do all in my power to maintain and elevate the standard of my profession and will hold in confidence all personal matters committed to my keeping and all family affairs coming to my knowledge in the practice of my calling.
With loyalty will I aid the physician in his work, and as a missioner of health, I will dedicate myself to devoted service for human welfare.

"Practical Nurse Pledge", a modern version based on the "Nightingale Pledge":

Before God and those assembled here, I solemnly pledge;
To adhere to the code of ethics of the nursing profession;
To co-operate faithfully with the other members of the nursing team and to carry out faithfully and to the best of my ability the instructions of the physician or the nurse who may be assigned to supervise my work;
I will not do anything evil or malicious and I will not knowingly give any harmful drug or assist in malpractice.
I will not reveal any confidential information that may come to my knowledge in the course of my work.
And I pledge myself to do all in my power to raise the standards and prestige of the practical nursing;
May my life be devoted to service and to the high ideals of the nursing profession.

== See also ==
- Veterinarian's Oath
