= Jean Watson =

American nurse theorist and nursing professor

Jean Watson, PhD, RN, AHN-BC, FAAN, LL (AAN) (born June 10, 1940) is an American nurse theorist and nursing professor who is best known for her theory of human caring. She is the author of numerous texts, including Nursing: The Philosophy and Science of Caring. Watson's research on caring has been incorporated into education and patient care at hundreds of nursing schools and healthcare facilities across the world.

== Biography ==
Watson was born June 10, 1940, in Welch, West Virginia, the youngest of eight children. She attended high school in West Virginia. Watson knew she wanted to be a nurse at the age of 10 when she saw a friend of her older sister having a seizure. Her father died suddenly when she was 16 years old, something she claims made her particularly sensitive to people and their suffering for the rest of her life. She attended the Lewis Gale School of Nursing located in Roanoke, Virginia, where she graduated in 1961. Keen to go beyond the medical pathology she learned at nursing school, Watson completed both her bachelor's degree in nursing and her master's degree in Psychiatric Mental Health Nursing at the University of Colorado at Boulder by 1966. In 1973, after earning her Ph.D. in Educational Psychology and Counseling, Watson begun her career teaching nursing courses at the CU College of Nursing. By 1979 she was the director of the university's doctoral program, and in 1986 she became the founder and director of its Center for Human Care. She served as dean of the College of Nursing at the University Health Sciences Center and president of the National League for Nursing.

In 1997, Watson sustained an injury that resulted in the loss of her left eye, then a year later, her husband of 37 years died by suicide. She claims the two incidents allowed her to understand her work on another level, saying: “It was this journey of losing my eye and losing my world as I had known it, including my beloved and devoted husband, who shortly thereafter, committed suicide –that I awakened and grasped my own writing".

In 2008 she founded the Watson Caring Science Institute, an NGO that aims to advance Watson's work on Caring Theory.

== Caring Theory ==
The theory of human caring, first developed by Watson in 1979, is patient care that involves a more holistic treatment for patients. As opposed to just using science to care for and heal patients, at the center of the theory of human caring is the idea that being more attentive and conscious during patient interactions allows for more effective and continuous care with a deeper personal connection. Watson's theory was influenced by several philosophers and thinkers including Abraham Maslow, Carl Rogers, and Pierre Teilhard de Chardin, each of whom were pioneers in creating the concept of transpersonal. Watson defines the idea of transpersonal as "an inter-subjective human-human relationship in which the person of the nurse affects and is affected by the person of the other. Both are fully present in the moment and feel a union with the other." The four major concepts in the science of caring are health, nursing, environment or society, and human being.

- Health: The connection between the mind, body, and spirit. This concept is dependent upon the likeness of how one is seen versus what they experience.
- Society: The value that society projects upon people about how they should act or achieve in life.
- Nursing: The science of human care and health. This involves interactions with individuals that have an active role in patient care and those that are being taken care of.
- Human being: A person that is valued, respected, and cared for. They are seen as fully functional and whole.

Over the course of her many academic works, Watson developed a set of 10 "caritive" processes to act as a guide for the core of nursing. The following are translation of the "carative" factors into clinical processes.

- Practice of loving kindness and equanimity within context of caring consciousness.
- Being authentically present, and enabling and sustaining the deep belief system and subjective life world of self and the one-being-cared-for.
- Cultivation of one's own spiritual practices and transpersonal self, going beyond ego self, opening to others with sensitivity and compassion.
- Developing and sustaining a helping-trusting, authentic caring relationship.
- Being present to, and supportive of, the expression of positive and negative feelings as a connection with deeper spirit of self and the one-being-cared-for.
- Creative use of self and all ways of knowing as part of the caring process; to engage in artistry of caring-healing practices.
- Engaging in genuine teaching-learning experience that attends to unity of being and meaning, attempting to stay within others’ frames of reference.
- Creating healing environment at all levels (physical as well as non-physical), subtle environment of energy and consciousness, whereby wholeness, beauty, comfort, dignity, and peace are potentiated.
- Assisting with basic needs, with an intentional caring consciousness, administering “human care essentials,” which potentiate alignment of mindbodyspirit, wholeness, and unity of being in all aspects of care; tending to both the embodied spirit and evolving spiritual emergence.
- Opening and attending to spiritual-mysterious and existential dimensions of one's own lifedeath; soul care for self and the one-being-cared-for.

One of the USA's largest healthcare delivery systems, Kaiser Permanente, has used Watson's theory in California for many years. Stanford Health Care is also an affiliate of the Watson Caring Science Institute. In a 2023 interview, Watson stated that “I’ve been told that something like 300 hospitals use my work, so it’s had kind of a life of its own. But the thing is, it’s not my work – it’s nursing. I’m just giving a voice to nursing. I haven’t done anything original. I’ve just provided a language, and a philosophical and scientific framework that holds it together and makes it understandable”.

== Academic appointments ==
Watson was appointed as the dean emerita of nursing at the University of Colorado in the fall of 1983, taking the university's college of nursing into its “golden age”. During a 2023 interview, Watson revealed that she was at first reluctant to accept the position due to the amount of unrealized potential she saw in the college.

As dean, Watson advanced research and refined the university's doctorate program. Seeing the need for a more interdisciplinary, philosophical-theory-guided approach to patient care, in 1986 she established the Center for Human Caring. She also established the Denver Nursing Project in Human Caring, which saw the university partner with local hospitals to support patients with AIDS and HIV.

In a 2023 interview, Watson recalled that one clinic at the Denver VA hospital “was totally community-oriented and guided under my theory. It was initiated because at the time the AIDS population was being hospitalized inappropriately. We listened to the people and provided whatever they wanted – whether it was exercise physiology, nutrition, healing touch, massage, or group therapy. It was totally interdisciplinary, and we were able to demonstrate that we saved over a million dollars every year by hosting that program”.

Faculty members remember Watson's deanship transforming the college into an “epicenter for human caring”. Watson has stated that “I’ve had faculty tell me that it was like Camelot when I was dean. For me, it was great fun. It was challenging in terms of what we were doing, but I had good support from the chancellor. Even when we didn’t always agree, we agreed to disagree. So, it was really a very collaborative, exciting, and creative time. And faculty thrived. We were No. 5 in the country for research funded by the National Institutes of Health. That’s pretty special, and we haven’t gotten back there since".

She served as the dean of nursing at the University of Colorado from 1983 until 1990. While Caring Science is no longer such a large part of the nursing college at the university, it still offers a PhD in Nursing and Caring Science.

Watson also held the title of Distinguished Professor of Nursing; the highest honor accorded its faculty for scholarly work. In 1999 she assumed the Murchinson-Scoville Chair in Caring Science, the nation's first endowed chair in Caring Science, based at the University of Colorado Denver & Anschutz Medical Center.

Prior to her deanship, Dr. Watson earned her baccalaureate in nursing from the University of Colorado Nursing in 1964. Two years later, she earned a master's degree in psychiatric-mental health nursing, before earning her doctorate in educational psychology and counselling in 1973.

== Leadership achievements ==
Watson founded the original Center for Human Caring in Colorado in 1988. She is a past president of the National League for Nursing. She is founder of the original Center for Human Caring in Colorado and is a Fellow of the American Academy of Nursing. She is Founder and Director of non-profit foundation, Watson Caring Science Institute.

== Honors and awards ==
Watson has been awarded sixteen honorary doctoral degrees, including thirteen international honorary doctoral degrees. She has received numerous awards including:

- Fetzer Institute Norman Cousins Award
- Fulbright Research Award
- Living Legend, inducted in 2013 by the American Academy of Nursing
- An international Kellogg Fellowship in Australia
- Pioneering Work in Caring Science award
- The honorary chairperson of the Japanese International Society of Caring and Peace
- The Visionary Award for Caring Science Leadership

She holds sixteen Honorary Doctoral Degrees, including 13 International Honorary Doctorates (E. G. Sweden, United Kingdom, Spain, British Columbia and Quebec, Canada, Japan, Turkey, Peru and Colombia, S. America, Ireland).

== Works ==
Watson is the author and co-author of over 30 books on caring theory. Her first book, Nursing: The Philosophy and Science of Caring, was published in 1979, Boston, Little Brown. It set out the frame work of Watson's Caring Theory and The 10 Caritas Processes®. The book has been continually revised as Watson theories developed, so as to remain a comprehensive overview of the history and evolution of Caring Science philosophy and theory.

Her 2002 book Assessing and measuring caring in nursing and health sciences, and 2005 book Caring science as sacred science, have both received the American Journal of Nursing's “Book of the Year” award.

Watson's more recent work looks at unitary caring science, examining the role of nurses through the lens of world view of unison, belonging and connection.
