= Martha E. Rogers =

American nurse, researcher, theorist, and author

Martha Elizabeth Rogers (May 12, 1914 – March 13, 1994) was an American nurse, researcher, theorist, and author. While professor of nursing at New York University, Rogers developed the "Science of Unitary Human Beings", a body of ideas that she described in her book An Introduction to the Theoretical Basis of Nursing.

== Early life and education ==
She was born in Dallas, Texas, the oldest of four children of Bruce Taylor Rogers and Lucy Mulholland Keener Rogers. She began college at the University of Tennessee, studying pre-med (1931-1933) and withdrew due to pressure that medicine was an unsuitable career for a woman. She received a diploma from the Knoxville General Hospital School of Nursing in 1936. The following year she received an undergraduate degree in public health nursing at George Peabody College in Nashville, Tennessee. She received an M.A. in public health nursing from Teachers College, Columbia University in 1945, an M.P.H. in 1952 and a Sc.D. in 1954, both from Johns Hopkins School of Public Health.

== Career ==
She specialized in public health nursing, working in Michigan, Connecticut, and Arizona, where she established the Visiting Nurse Service of Phoenix, Arizona. Between 1952 and 1975, she was Professor and Head of the Division of Nursing at New York University; she became Professor Emeritus in 1979.

== Death ==
Rogers died March 13, 1994, and was buried in Knoxville, Tennessee. In 1996, she was posthumously inducted into the American Nurses Association's Hall of Fame.

== Nursing theory ==
Rogers' theory is known as the Science of Unitary Human Beings. Its primary tenets include the following:

- Nursing is both a science and art; the uniqueness of nursing, like that of any other science, lies in the phenomenon central to its focus.
- Nurses’ long-established concern with the people and the world they live is a natural forerunner of an organized abstract system encompassing people and their environments.
- The irreducible nature of individuals is more than the sum of the parts.
- The integralness of people and the environment that coordinate with a multidimensional universe of open systems points to a new paradigm: the identity of nursing as a science.
- The purpose of nursing is to promote health and wellbeing for all persons wherever they are.

A form of energy medicine, the Science of Unitary Human Beings is based on the idea that "human beings and environment are energy fields" that are characterized by "four-dimensionality", a "nonlinear domain without spatial or temporal attributes"; postulates that physicist Alan Sokal describes as "pseudoscientific verbiage" and "perfectly meaningless". Jef Raskin wrote that Rogers' writings were filled with contradictions, "fuzzy physics," and vagaries. "Unlike science, nursing theory has no built-in mechanisms for rejecting falsehoods, tautologies, and irrelevancies."

== Publications ==
- Educational Revolution in Nursing (1961)
- Reveille in Nursing (1964)
- An Introduction to the Theoretical Basis of Nursing (1970)
