= Neuman systems model =

Model in nursing theory

The Neuman systems model is a nursing theory based on the individual's relationship to stress, the reaction to it, and reconstitution factors that are dynamic in nature. The theory was developed by Betty Neuman, a community health nurse, professor and counselor. The central core of the model consists of energy resources (normal temperature range, genetic structure, response pattern, organ strength or weakness, ego structure, and knowns or commonalities) that are surrounded by several lines of resistance, the normal line of defense, and the flexible line of defense. The lines of resistance represent the internal factors that help the patient defend against a stressor, the normal line of defense represents the person's state of equilibrium, and the flexible line of defense depicts the dynamic nature that can rapidly alter over a short period of time.

The purpose of the nurse is to retain this system's stability through the three levels of prevention:

1. Primary prevention to protect the normal line and strengthen the flexible line of defense.
2. Secondary prevention to strengthen internal lines of resistance, reducing the reaction, and increasing resistance factors.
3. Tertiary prevention to readapt and stabilize and protect reconstitution or return to wellness following treatment.

== See also ==
- Nursing theory
