= Helvie energy theory of nursing and health =

American theory of nursing

The Helvie Energy Theory of Nursing and Health is a nursing theory developed by Carl O. Helvie's lifelong cross-cultural exposure to various ways of assessing, planning, implementing and evaluating health with application to individuals, families, and to specific communities across the world.

Following publication of an advanced practice registered nursing textbook using the theory as a framework, the theory was cited and discussed in graduate nursing textbooks, in graduate nursing courses and in nursing agency manuals. Likewise the Helvie Energy Theory has been widely appropriated for use in Alternative Health literature.
