= Empowered Holistic Nursing Education =

Middle range nursing theory

Empowered Holistic Nursing Education - Mid-range Nursing Theory

The Empowered Holistic Nursing Education (EHNE) nursing theory is a middle range nursing theory that was developed between 2008 and 2014 by Katie Love. It is particularly used In undergraduate level nursing education, where students are first being socialized into nursing professional practice.

== Central philosophy ==
The nursing theory is based upon the philosophy that students need to experience holism and empowerment in the classroom to not only have a positive learning experience, but to integrate holism and empowerment in their own professional practice. Examination of power structures and cultural perspectives is supportive of diverse student populations, and therefore diverse patient populations.

== EHNE principles ==
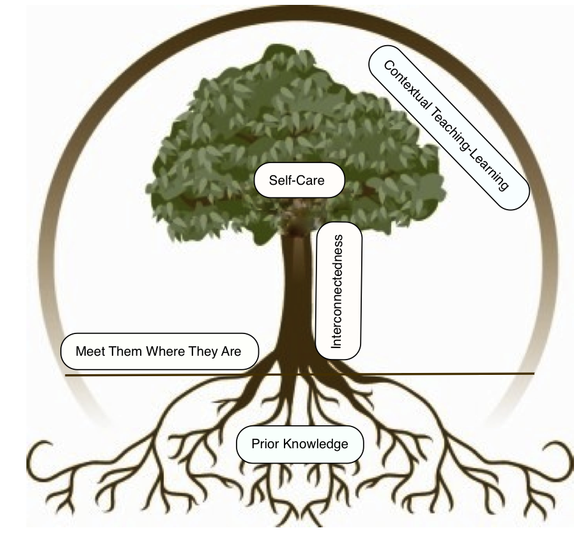

EHNE principles are the basis of the theory as Love identified. They are described as:

Prior knowledge: Knowledge and experience the student brings is the foundation from where learning begins.

Meet them where they are: Making teaching responsive to the diverse learning needs of students, and where the teacher learns from the student.

Interconnectedness: Experiencing our connection to one another, being present, and growing together. Self-Care: Nurturing ourselves so we may nurture others.

Contextual Teaching and Learning: Addressing the environmental factors that influence readiness to learn, such as mind-body-spirit imbalance, values and beliefs, with culturally appropriate education and holism.

== Support modalities ==
Nurse educators are encouraged to integrate 1) complementary and alternative modalities (CAM) into their classrooms and 2) Praxis: Reflection and Action:

1) All CAM can be used to start class, before/after exams, or as a whole class to experience directly. These modalities have been used in nursing classrooms for this purpose:

- Guided imagery
- Meditation
- Progressive muscle relaxation
- Tapping
- Aromatherapy
- Drumming
- Belly dancing
- Yoga
- Breathing

2) Reflection of personal bias, world view, experiences, and values is done as a part of experiential learning experiences. Supporting students from diverse backgrounds such as race, class, religion, and the LGBT community leads to the diversification of the profession and socializes nursing students how to support diverse patient populations.
