= Nurse–client relationship =

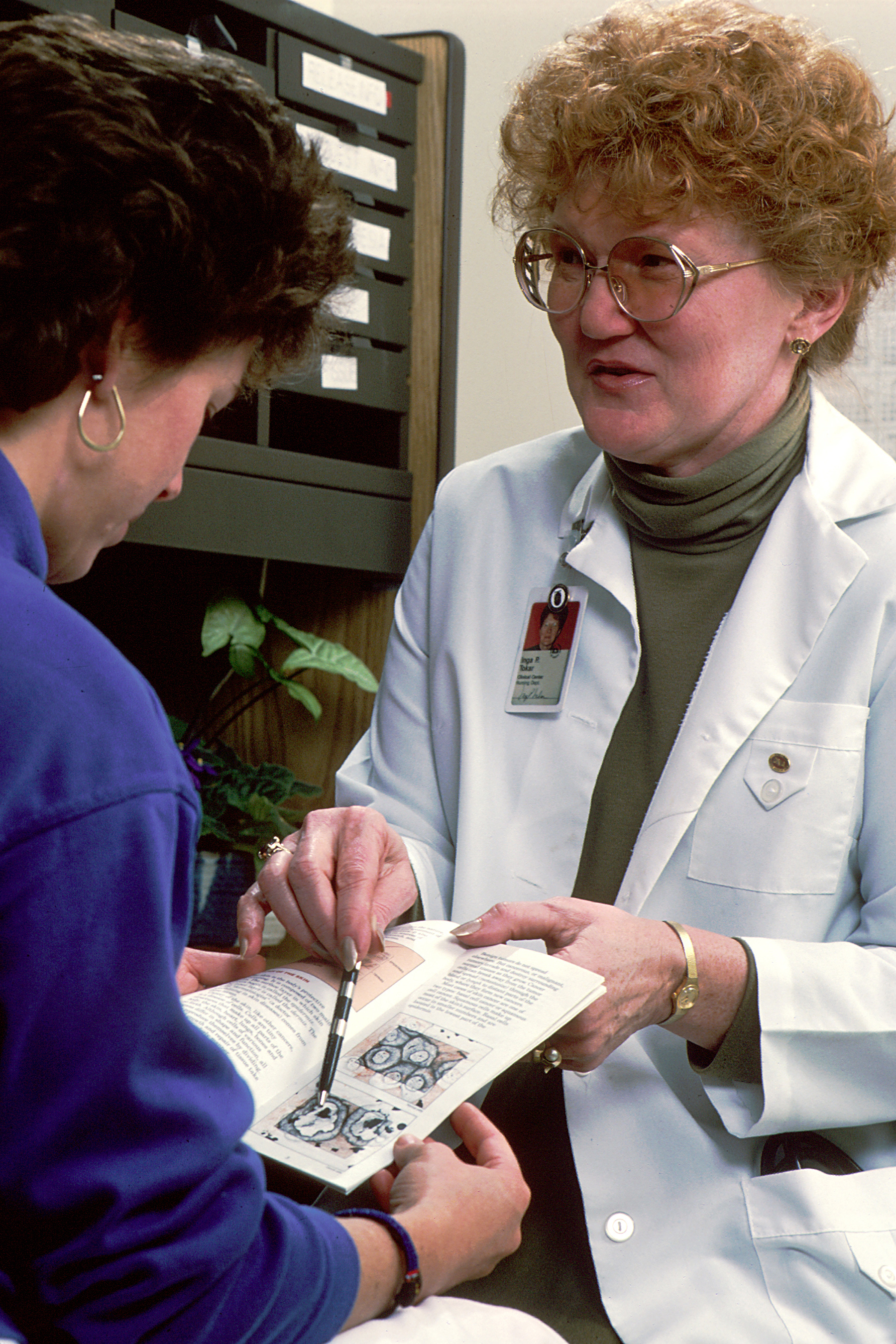
Nurse explaining information in a brochure with a client. Picture was taken by Bill Branson (Photographer).

The nurse–client relationship is an interaction between a nurse and "client" (patient) aimed at enhancing the well-being of the client, who may be an individual, a family, a group, or a community.

== Peplau ==
Peplau's theory is of high relevance to the nurse-client relationship, with one of its major aspects being that both the nurse and the client become more knowledgeable and mature over the course of their relationship. Hildegard Peplau believed that the relationship depended on the interaction of the thoughts, feelings, and actions of each person and that the patient will experience better health when all their specific needs are fully considered in the relationship. The nurse-patient relationship enables nurses to spend more time, to connect, to interact with their patients as well as to understand their patient's needs. It assists nurses to establish a unique perspective regarding the meaning of the patient's illness, beliefs, and preferences of patients/families. Thus, the patients/families feel that they are being cared for and they feel more motivated to open up to the nurses as well as working together to achieve better outcomes/satisfaction.

== Elements ==
The nurse-client relationship is composed of several elements.

=== Boundaries ===
Boundaries are an integral part of the nurse-client relationship. They represent invisible structures imposed by legal, ethical, and professional standards of nursing that respect the rights of nurses and clients. These boundaries ensure that the focus of the relationship remains on the client's needs, not only by word but also by law. The College of Nurses of Ontario (CNO) Standards identifies that it is the nurse's responsibility to establish the boundaries and limits of the relationship between the nurse and client. The boundaries have a specific purpose and health goal, and the relationship terminates when identified goal is met.

Any action or behaviour in a nurse-client relationship that personally benefits the nurse at the expense of the client is a boundary violation. Some examples of boundary violations are engaging in a romantic or sexual relationship with a current client, extensive non-beneficial disclosure to the client and receiving a gift of money from the client. Abuse and neglect are extreme examples. They involve the betrayal of respect and trust within the relationship. This includes withholding communication from a client because it is considered to be an example of neglect.

It is the nurse's job to be aware of signs that professional boundaries may be crossed or have been crossed. Warning signs of boundary crossing that may lead to boundary violations include frequently thinking of a client in a personal way, keeping secrets with a specific client, favouring one client's care at the expense of another's and telling a client personal things about yourself in order to make an impression. Anything that could comprise the client's well-being if the relationship with a registered nurse is continued or discontinued can be considered a warning sign. Boundary violations are never acceptable and it is the nurse's job to handle any situation with any regards to it professionally and therapeutically regardless of who initiated it.

=== Confidentiality ===
This makes the relationship safe and establishes trust. The patient should feel comfortable disclosing personal information and asking questions. The nurse is to share information only with professional staff that needs to know and obtain the client's written permission to share information with others outside the treatment team.

== Therapeutic nurse behaviours ==
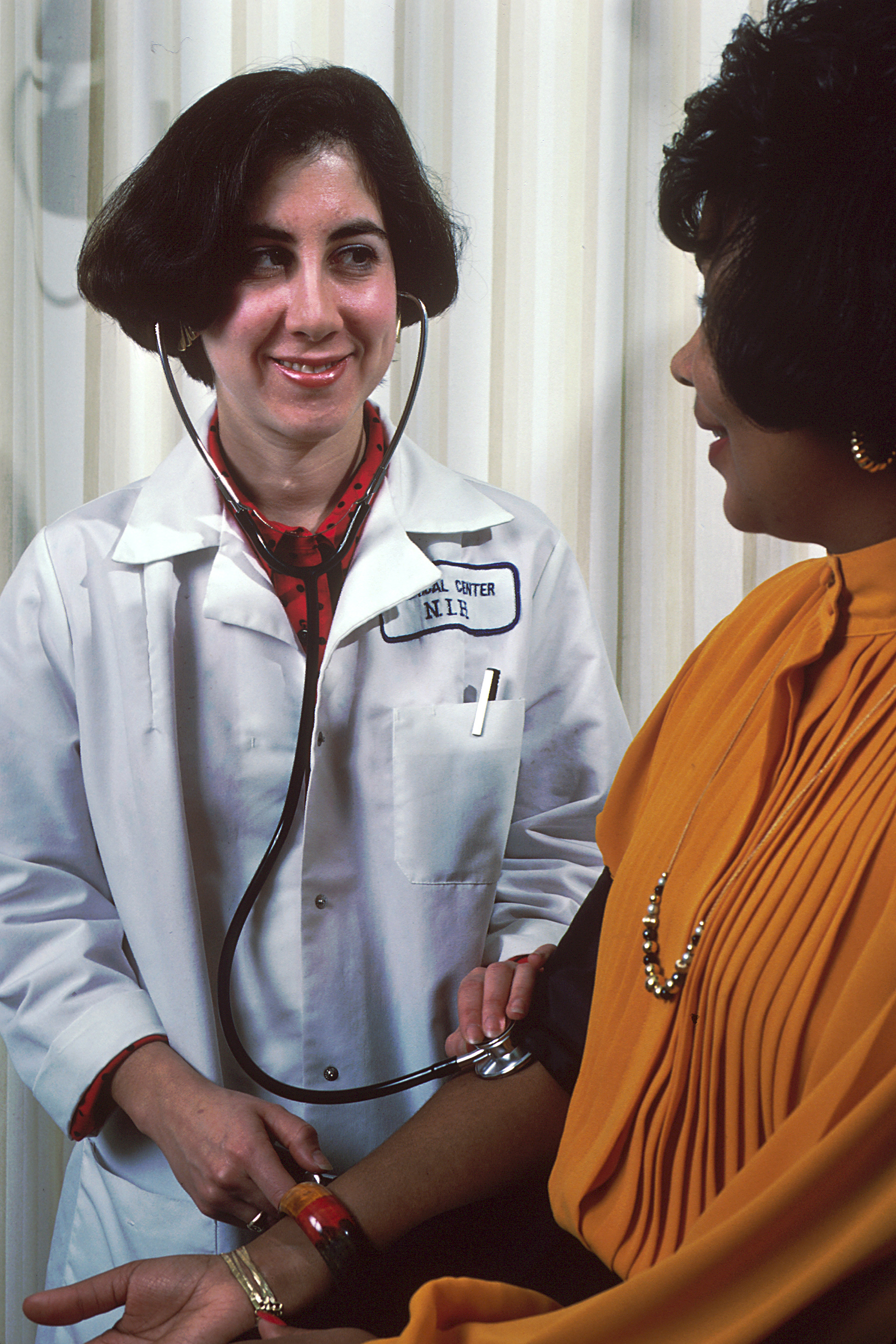
Nurse takes a client's blood pressure. This photo was taken by Bill Branson (Photographer).

Nurses are expected to always act in the best interests of the patient to maintain a relationship that is strictly with all intent to only benefit the client. The nurse must ensure that their client's needs are met while being professional. Extensive research and clinical observation has shown that the body, mind and emotions are in unity. Therefore, in order to help another person, one must consider all these aspects; this means not neglecting the person and strictly just treating the illness. Caring for patients is beyond the treatment of disease and disability.

The necessary knowledge aspects that are needed to maintain a therapeutic nurse-client relationship are: background knowledge, knowledge of interpersonal and development theory, knowledge of diversity influences and determinants, knowledge of person, knowledge of health/illness, knowledge of the broad influences on health care and health care policy, and knowledge of systems.

Background knowledge is the nurse's education, and her life experience. Knowledge of interpersonal and development theory is the knowledge of theories of the sense of self and self influence on others. The specific theories are: The Interpersonal Theory, Object relation theory, Developmental theory, and Gender/developmental theory. Knowledge of person explains that nurses must take the time to understand the client, and their world; what is meaningful to them, and their history. Knowledge of Health and Illness is the knowledge that the nurse must attain about their client's health issue. Knowledge of the broad influences on health care and health care policy explains that nurses need to be aware of the influences of the client's care; social/political forces, expectations of health-care system, and changes in accessibility, and resources. Knowledge of Systems explains that the nurse needs to know about the health-care system so they can help their clients access services. Effective communication in nursing entails being empathic, non-judgmental, understanding, approachable, sympathetic, caring, and having safe and ethical qualities. The first statement of the CNO Standard is Therapeutic Communication, which explains that a nurse should apply communication and interpersonal skills to create, maintain, and terminate a nurse-client relationship.

All of the aspects to a therapeutic relationship are interrelated. You cannot efficiently use one aspect without the other; they are all connected and work together to create a successful relationship. Nurses assist clients to achieve their health related goals including improving their relationship with others. "The help that nurses offer to their clients is much more than technical expertise. The relationship between nurse and client is a powerful healing force by itself.

Therapeutic nurse-patient communication is a key aspect of the performance of the nurse's role. Therapeutic communication benefits not only the patient but the nurse as well. Nurses report higher job satisfaction connected with positive communication with patients. Improved communication with patients increases the nurses ability to do their job effectively, which in turn increases job satisfaction. Reports of increased job satisfaction reduces the reported instance of compassion fatigue. Increased compassion fatigue reduce the nurse's ability to communicate effectively and compassionately with the patient, impairing therapeutic behaviours and communication, and decreasing the effectiveness of the nurse-patient relationship, and safe care. It is a cycle where therapeutic communication leads to a positive relationship that increases both patient and nurse satisfaction that improves the nurses ability to continue therapeutic behaviours.

Of course, other factors are involved in the nurse's ability to engage in therapeutic behaviours. As mentioned, compassion fatigue hinders the nurses ability to form a therapeutic relationship with the patient. Many factors contribute to compassion fatigue, short-staffing and increased responsibilities are highest on the list. These factors also contribute to the patient's perception of a positive nurse-patient relationship. Patient responses indicate that timeliness, attentiveness, and time spent in communication improved the patient's perception of a positive nurse-patient relationship. A therapeutic nurse-patient relationship increases the patient's trust in the nurse. Additionally, the patient is more willing to provide information to the nurse that may be pertinent to the safe care and medical needs of the patient. A therapeutic relationship can help patients cope better and lead to calmness at a time that the patient may be struggling with difficult situations.

=== Self-awareness ===
Self-awareness is an internal evaluation of one self and of one's reactions to emotionally charged situations, people and places. It offers an opportunity to recognise how our attitudes, perceptions, past and present experiences, and relationships frame or distort interactions with others. An example of self-awareness would be acknowledging that showing anger is not a sign of weakness, because there were emotions outside of your control. Self-awareness allows you to fully engage with a client and presence; being with the client in the moment, allows the nurse to know when to provide help and when to stand back. Until individuals can fully understand themselves they cannot understand others. Nurses need self-awareness in this relationship to be able to relate to the patient's experiences to develop empathy.

=== Genuine, warm and respectful ===
Highly skilled, experienced nurses must possess certain attributes or skills to successfully establish a nurse client relationship. Attributes such as being genuine, warm and respectful are a few to mention. An aspect of respect is respecting an individual's culture and ensuring open-mindedness is being incorporated all throughout the relationship up until the termination phase. The nurse works to empower the client along with their family to get more engaged in learning about their health and ways in which it can be improved. It is highly beneficial for the client to incorporate their family, as they may be the most effective support system. Revealing your whole self and being genuine with clients will accomplish the desired nurse client relationship.

Behaving therapeutically may require remaining silent at times to display acceptance, incorporating open ended questions to allow the client control of the conversation and encouragement to continue. In addition, the nurse may also reduce distance to demonstrate their desire in being involved, restating and reflecting to validate the nurse's interpretation of the client's message, directing the conversation towards important topics by focusing in on them. Furthermore, being polite and punctual displays respect for the client in addition to remembering to be patient, understanding, also to praise and encourage the client for their attempts to take better care of their health. A primary factor in establishing a nurse client relationship is the non-verbal message or behaviours you send out unconsciously, resulting in a negative perception and may distort your attempts in effectively assisting the client to achieve optimal health. One of the non-verbal factors is listening. Listening behaviours are identified as S.O.L.E.R; S-sit squarely in relation to client, O-maintain an open position and do not cross arms or legs, L-lean slightly towards the client, E-maintain reasonable and comfortable eye contact, R-relax. These behaviours are effective for communication skills, and are useful for thinking about how to listen to another person.

=== Empathy ===
Having the ability to enter the perceptual world of the other person and understanding how they experience the situation is empathy. This is an important therapeutic nurse behaviour essential to convey support, understanding and share experiences. A client to a nurse in a general sense is seeking help. Patients are expecting a nurse who will show interest, sympathy, and an understanding of their difficulties. When receiving care patients tend to be looking for more than the treatment of their disease or disability, they want to receive psychological consideration. this happens through good communication, communication with clients is the foundation of care.

During hard times, clients are looking for a therapeutic relationship that will make their treatment as less challenging as possible. Many patients are aware that a solution to their problems may not be available but expect to have support through them and that this is what defines a positive or negative experience. Empathy is used as a tool to enhance the communication between the nurse and client. Past experiences can help the clinician can better understand issues in order to provide better intervention and treatment.

=== Cultural sensitivity ===
Healthcare is a culturally diverse environment and nurses have to expect that they will care for patients from many different cultures and ethnic backgrounds. Cultural backgrounds affect people's perceptions of life and health. The goal of the nurse is to develop a body of knowledge that allows them to provide culturally specific care. This begins with an open mind and accepting attitude.

Cultural competence is a viewpoint that increases respect and awareness for patients from cultures different from the nurse's own. Cultural sensitivity is putting aside our own perspective to understand another person's perceptive. Caring and culture are described as being intricately linked.This is believed because there can be no cure without caring and caring involves knowing the different values and behaviours of a person's culture. It is important to assess language needs and request for a translation service if needed and provide written material in the patient's language; also, trying to mimic the patient's style of communication (such as little direct eye contact, slow, quiet).

A major obstacle to cultural sensitivity and good communication is ethnocentrism, which is the belief that one's ethnic group is superior to another; this causes prejudice and stops a nurse from fully understanding the patient. Another obstacle is stereotyping; a patient's background is often multifaceted, encompassing many ethic and cultural traditions. In order to individualise communication and provide culturally sensitive care it is important to understand the complexity of social, ethnic, cultural and economic factors. This involves overcoming certain attitudes and offering consistent, non-judgemental care to all patients. Accepting the person for who they are regardless of diverse backgrounds and circumstances or differences in morals or beliefs. By exhibiting these attributes trust can grow between patient and nurse. Nurses need to know the outcome of social, cultural, and racial differences, and how they can affect the therapeutic relationship. Nurses need to acknowledge the impact of culture in order to practice health in a way that respects a person's beliefs and values.

=== Collaborative goal setting ===
A therapeutic nurse-client relationship is established for the benefit of the client. It includes nurses working with the client to create goals directed at improving their health status. Goals are centered on the client's values, beliefs and needs. A partnership is formed between nurse and client. The nurse empowers patient and families to get involved in their health. This relationship has three phases, a beginning (first time contact/introduction), a middle (develop a relationship to deliver care) and an end (the patient is no longer dependent on the nurse). To make this process successful the nurse must value, respect and listen to clients as individuals. Focus should be on the feelings, priorities, challenges, and ideas of the patient, with progressive aim of enhancing optimum physical, spiritual, and mental health.

=== Responsible, ethical practice ===
This is a communication-based relationship, therefore, a responsibility to interact, educate, and share information genuinely is placed upon the nurse. The fourth statement of the CNO Standard is, Protecting Clients from Abuse. It is stated that it is the nurse's job to report abuse of their client to ensure that their client is safe from harm. Nurses must intervene and report any abusive situations observed that might be seen as violent, threatening, or intended to inflict harm. Nurses must also report any health care provider's behaviors or remarks towards clients that are perceived as romantic, or sexually abusive.

== Clients' perspectives ==
Coatsworth-Puspoky, Forchuk, and Ward-Griffin conducted a study on clients' perspectives in the nurse–client relationship. Interviews were done with participants from Southern Ontario, ten had been hospitalised for a psychiatric illness and four had experiences with nurses from community-based organisations, but were never hospitalised. The participants were asked about experiences at different stages of the relationship. The research described two relationships that formed the "bright side" and the "dark side".

The "bright" relationship involved nurses who validated clients and their feelings. For example, one client tested his trust of the nurse by becoming angry with her and revealing his negative thoughts related to the hospitalisation. The client stated, "she's trying to be quite nice to me ... if she's able to tolerate this occasional venomous attack, which she has done quite well right up to now, it will probably be a very beneficial relationship".

The "dark" side of the relationship resulted in the nurse and client moving away from each other. For example, one client stated, "The nurses' general feeling was when someone asks for help, they're being manipulative and attention seeking". The nurse didn't recognise the client who has an illness with needs therefore; the clients avoided the nurse and perceived the nurse as avoiding them. One patient reported, "the nurses all stayed in their central station. They didn't mix with the patients ... The only interaction you have with them is medication time". Neither trust nor caring was exchanged so perceptions of mutual avoiding and ignoring resulted. One participant stated, "no one cares. It doesn't matter. It's just, they don't want to hear it. They don't want to know it; they don't want to listen". The relationship that developed depended on the nurse's personality and attitude. These findings bring awareness about the importance of the nurse–client relationship.

== Building trust ==
Building trust is beneficial to how the relationship progresses. Wiesman used interviews with 15 participants who spent at least three days in intensive care to investigate the factors that helped develop trust in the nurse–client relationship. Patients said nurses promoted trust through attentiveness, competence, comfort measures, personality traits, and provision of information. Every participant stated the attentiveness of the nurse was important to develop trust. One said the nurses "are with you all the time. Whenever anything comes up, they're in there caring for you". Competence was seen by seven participants as being important in the development of trust. "I trusted the nurses because I could see them doing their job. They took time to do little things and made sure they were done right and proper," stated one participant. The relief of pain was seen by five participants as promoting trust.

One client stated, "they were there for the smallest need. I remember one time where they repositioned me maybe five or six times in a matter of an hour". A good personality was stated by five participants as important. One said, "they were all friendly, and they make you feel like they've known you for a long time". Receiving adequate information was important to four participants. One participant said, "they explained things. They followed it through, step by step". The findings of this study show how trust is beneficial to a lasting relationship.

== Emotional support ==
Emotional Support is giving and receiving reassurance and encouragement done through understanding. Yamashita, Forchuk, and Mound conducted a study to examine the process of nurse case management involving clients with mental illness. Nurses in inpatient, transitional, and community settings in four cities in Ontario Canada were interviewed. The interviews show the importance of providing emotional support to the patients. One nurse stated that if the client knows "Somebody really cares enough to see how they are doing once a week ... by going shopping with them or to a doctor's appointment. To them it means the world".

The interviews showed it was crucial to include the family as therapeutic allies. A nurse stated that "We're with the families. We can be with them as oppositional and overly involved and somewhere else in between, and we're in contact with them as much as they want". With frequent contact the nurse was able to discuss possibilities with the family. The study reaffirmed the importance of emotional support in the relationship.

== Humour ==
Humour is important in developing a lasting relationship. Astedt-Kurki, Isola, Tammentie, and Kervinen asked readers to write about experiences with humour while in the hospital through a patient organisation newsletter. Letters were chosen from 13 chronically ill clients from Finland. The clients were also interviewed in addition to their letters. The interviews reported that humour played an important role in health. A paralyzed woman said, "Well you have to have a sense of humour if you want to live and survive. You have to keep it up no matter how much it hurts".

Humour helped clients accept what happened by finding a positive outlook. One participant stated, "... when you're sick as you can be and do nothing but lie down and another person does everything in her power to help, humour really makes you feel good". Humour also serves as a defence mechanism, especially in men. A participant said, "For male patients humour is also a way of concealing their feelings. It's extremely hard for them to admit they're afraid".The patient finds it easier to discuss difficult matters when a nurse has a sense of humour. "A nurse who has a sense of humour, ... that's the sort of nurse you can talk to, that's the sort of nurse you can turn to and ask for help ..." reported a participant. This study lends support that if humour is generally important to people, then in times of change it will remain important.
