= Lystra Gretter =

Canadian-American nurse (1858–1951)

Lystra Gretter

Lystra Gretter (née Eggert; September 3, 1858 – 1951) was a Canadian-American nurse who devoted her career to improving the nursing field in Michigan, promoting nursing as a profession, and writing the Nightingale Pledge, a nurses' pledge.

== Biography ==
Born Lystra Eggert, in Bayfield, Canada West (today Ontario), her father was a Swiss doctor and her mother was Canadian of Dutch descent. She attended grade school in the Bayfield area until 1866, when her family moved to Greensboro, North Carolina, United States. It was there that she began attending private schools. After graduation, at the age of 19, she married John Birney Gretter. Her husband was approximately 26 years older and a veteran of the Confederate Army led by Robert E. Lee. They had one daughter.

In 1884, John died, leaving Gretter to raise their daughter alone. In 1886, she moved to Buffalo, New York, with her mother and sister. It was then that she began attending school at the Buffalo General Hospital Training School for Nurses. Two years later, Gretter graduated with honors, well above many students in her class. Following graduation, she was given the position of Principal of the Farrand Training School for Nurses located in Detroit, Michigan, at Harper Hospital.

From 1889 to 1907, she maintained the position of nursing school superintendent. It was during this time that Gretter made changes that affected the training of nurses around the United States. The nursing programs were expanded from one year to two years, and later on, to three years. This allowed future nurses more time on the floor, thus gaining more experience. With Gretter putting effort into training, it was one of the main reasons that Michigan became the second state in the nation to require a nursing certification.

In 1908, Gretter was appointed director of the Detroit Visiting Nurses Association. During this time she founded tuberculosis hospitals and also made way for the first free maternity and infant care clinics in Detroit, as well as made health screenings available to all school aged children.

Although Gretter made an impact on the nursing world, she is most commonly known for composing, in part, along with the Committee for the Farrand Training School for Nurses, the Nightingale Pledge in 1893. The pledge is a modified version of the Hippocratic Oath, and although modified in many ways, is still used by physicians today.

During her final years, Gretter helped in the gathering of nurses for the American Red Cross Nursing Service during both World Wars as well as maintained her position of the Detroit Visiting Nurses Association. She remained in Grosse Pointe, Michigan, until she died in 1951.

In 2004, Lystra Gretter was inducted into the Michigan Women's Hall of Fame for her efforts to promote nursing as a profession during the 19th and 20th centuries.
