= Carl O. Helvie =

American registered nurse (1932–2019)

Carl O. Helvie (August 13, 1932 – December 3, 2019) was an American registered nurse and Professor Emeritus of Nursing at Old Dominion University. Helvie is known for his development and implementation of the Helvie Energy Theory of Nursing and Health.

As a lung cancer survivor he has focused on holistic alternative integrative health and wellness interventions. A major part of his career also focused on education, practice and research with homeless and low-income individuals and families. He has published books, articles, and research findings in these three areas.

== Published works ==
- Helvie, C, (1975) Self-Assessment of Current Knowledge in Community Health Nursing. New York: Medical Examiners Publishing Co.
- Helvie, C. (1981) Community Health Nursing: Theory and Process New York: Harper & Row Co.
- Helvie, C. (1991) Community Health Nursing: Theory and Practice, New York: Springer Publishing Co.
- Helvie, C. (1998) Advanced Practice Nursing in the Community, Thousand Oaks, California: Sage Publishing Co
- Helvie, C and Kunstmann, W. (1999) Homelessness in the United States, Europe, and Russia, Connecticut: Greenwood. June
- Clark, C (editor in chief), Gordon, R. (contributing editor), Harris, B. and Helvie, C. (advisory contributing editors) (1999) Encyclopedia of Alternative Health Practices. New York, Springer Publishing Co
- Helvie, C. (2000) "The homeless, health promotion and nursing centers." Community Health Promotion (C.C.Clarke, editor) New York:Springer
- Helvie, C. (2002) "Home care for the seriously ill in the United States." In Ambuant vor stationär. Perspektiven für eine integrierte ambulante Pflege Schwerstkranker (Schaeffer, D. and Ewers, M., Editors). Bern: Huber Verlag. Germany
- Helvie, C. (2002) "Community Mobilization and Participation." In Health Promotion in Communities (C.C. Clark, Editor). New York, Springer. Pg 69–82.
- Helvie, C. (2002) "Health Promotion in a Homeless Center." In Health Promotion in Communities. (C.C. Clark, Editor). New York: Springer. Pg 461–464.
- Helvie, C. (2007) Healthy Holistic Aging: A Blueprint for Success, Minnesota: Syren Publications.
- Helvie, C (2012) You Can Beat Lung Cancer: Using Alternative/Integrative Interventions. with chapters by Dr Bernie Siegel, Dr Francisco Contreras, Dr James Forsythe, Dr Kim Datzell, and Tanya Harter Pierce, London: Ayni Books.
