= Anne Casey =

British nurse and writer

Anne Casey, FRCN is a New Zealand-trained nurse based in England, who developed Casey's model of nursing. In October 2002 Casey was made a Fellow of the Royal College of Nursing for her services to paediatric nursing.

== Casey's Model of Nursing ==
Casey's Model of Nursing was developed in 1988 by Casey whilst working on the Paediatric Oncology Unit at the Great Ormond Street Hospital London. The focus of the model is on working in partnership with children and their families, and was one of the earliest attempts to develop a model of practice specifically for child health nursing. The model has been developed in other areas of England to focus upon local aspects of practice.

It comprises the five concepts of child, family, health, environment and the nurse. The philosophy behind the model is that the best people to care for the child is the family with help from various professional staff. Another paediatric nursing model developed by Smith in "Children's nursing in practice: The Nottingham Model" emphasizes the family as client; But Casey's model sees the child as the client.

== Sources ==
- Casey A. The development and use of the partnership model of nursing care In: Glasper EA, Tucker A (eds) (1993) Advances in Child Health Nursing. London, Scutari Press; 1993.
- Smith, F. (1995). Children's nursing in practice: The Nottingham model. Oxford: Blackwell Science
