= Tidal Model =

The Tidal Model is a recovery model for the promotion of mental health developed by Phil Barker, Poppy Buchanan-Barker and their colleagues. The Tidal Model focuses on the continuous process of change inherent in all people. It seeks to reveal the meaning of people's experiences, emphasising the importance of their own voice and wisdom through the power of metaphor. It aims to empower people to lead their own recovery rather than being directed by professionals.

The philosophy underpinning the model initially was inspired by a five-year research into what people need for care in mental health carried out by Barker and Chris Stevenson at the University of Newcastle, UK. Since 2000, it has been put into practice in a number of settings in the UK and abroad.

Due to the work of Phil Barker in this area, he is frequently cited as being a prominent contemporary theorist in mental health nursing.

== Six key philosophical assumptions ==
The tidal model is applied through six key philosophical assumptions:

- a belief in the virtue of curiosity
- recognition of the power of resourcefulness, rather than focusing on problems, deficits or weaknesses
- respect for the person's wishes, rather than being paternalistic
- acceptance of the paradox of crisis as opportunity
- acknowledging that all goals must belong to the person
- the virtue of pursuing elegance—the simplest possible means should be sought

== The engagement process ==
In order for the practitioner to begin the process of engagement using the Tidal Model, the following needs to be accepted:

- that recovery is possible
- that change is inevitable—nothing lasts
- that ultimately, people know what is best for them
- that the person possesses all the resources they need to begin the recovery journey
- that the person is the teacher and the helpers are the pupils
- that the helper needs to be creatively curious, to learn what needs to be done to help the person

The process of engaging with the person in distress takes place in three discrete domains. With the Tidal Model, the practitioner explores these dimensions to be aware of the situation in the present time and determine what needs to happen now.

- Self domain is where people feel their world of experience. There is an emphasis on making people feel more secure and the practitioner helps the person develop a Security Plan to reduce threats to the person or others around them.
- World domain is where people hold their story. The Tidal Model practitioner uses a specific form of inquiry to explore this story collaboratively, revealing its hidden meanings, the person's resources, and to identify what needs to be done to assist recovery.
- Others domain represents the various relationships the person has: past, present and future. This includes Tidal Model practitioners but also other members of the health and social care team, friends, family and supporters.

== The metaphor ==
The Tidal Model uses the metaphor of water and describes how people in distress can become emotionally, physically and spiritually shipwrecked. It sees the experience of health and illness as a fluid, rather than a stable phenomenon, and life as a journey undertaken on an ocean of experience. It proposes that in mental health, the factors associated with a psychiatric crisis, or its more enduring consequences, can be diverse as well as cumulative. It states that by appreciating this metaphor, nurses or other helpers will gain a greater understanding of the person's current situation and the inevitability of change. With this, the helper may, in time, be guided to care with the person beginning their journey from the state of being washed ashore, drowning or being otherwise marooned by their life problems. Following the rescue, exploration can then begin as to what caused the storm in the first place and what needs to be done immediately to set sail again.

== The ten commitments ==
The values of the Tidal Model can be distilled into ten commitments.

1. Value the voice – the person's story is paramount
2. Respect the language – allow people to use their own language
3. Develop genuine curiosity – show interest in the person's story
4. Become the apprentice – learn from the person you are helping
5. Reveal personal wisdom – people are experts in their own story
6. Be transparent – both the person and the helper; professionals are in a privileged position and should model confidence by at all times being transparent and helping the person understand exactly what is being done
7. Use the available toolkit – the person's story contains valuable information as to what works and what doesn't
8. Craft the step beyond – the helper and the person work together to construct an appreciation of what needs to be done "now"
9. Give the gift of time – time is the midwife of change; the question that should be asked is, "How do we use this time?"
10. Know that change is constant – this is a common experience for all people

=== The twenty competencies ===
The twenty competencies were introduced to assist with the auditing of recovery practice by generating practice-based evidence for the model. They focus on competencies in practice and there are two related to each of the commitments above.

== The model in practice ==
In 2000, the Tidal Model was first implemented in Newcastle upon Tyne, UK in the adult mental health programme covering nine acute admission wards. Almost 100 different Tidal Model projects were established in the UK, Ireland, New Zealand, Canada, Japan and Australia. However, it has yet to be broadly adopted.

== See also ==
- Anti-psychiatry
- Nursing theory
- Solution focused brief therapy
