= Helen Erickson =

Helen Lorraine (Cook) Erickson (born 1936) is the primary author of the modeling and role-modeling theory of nursing. Her work, co-authored with Evelyn Tomlin and Mary Ann Swain, was published in the 1980s and derived from her experience in clinical practice. In 2006 she edited a book that provides additional information describing the relationships among soul, spirit, and human form.

== Career ==
Erickson was the first president of the Society for the Advancement of Modeling and Role-Modeling (SAMRM). The organization was established in 1986 at the University of Michigan.

She holds the title of Professor Emeritus at The University of Texas at Austin. She has served on the Board of Directors for the American Holistic Nurses Certification Corporation.

== Personal ==
Erickson was married to Lance Erickson in 1957 in Clare, Michigan. Together they live in Cedar Park, Texas.

== Works ==
Erickson, H. Ed. (2010) Exploring the Interface Between the Philosophy and Discipline of Holistic Nursing : Modeling and Role-Modeling at Work. Cedar Park, TX:Unicorns Unlimited.

Erickson, H. (2010). Erickson, Tomlin, & Swain theory of Modeling and role-modeling. In M. Parker (Ed). Nursing theories and Nursing Practices. Philadelphia, PA: F A Davis Company.

Erickson, H. (2009) Holistic Nurses’ Examinations: Past, Present, Future Journal of Holistic Nursing, Sept 2009; vol. 27: pp. 186 – 202.

Erickson, H. (2008) What is holistic nursing and why is it important? Advances for Nurses. Vol 6, Issue 20, September 29, pp. 31

Erickson, H. (2007) Philosophy and theory of holism, Nursing clinics of North America, Vol. 42 (2), pp. 139–163.

Erickson, H. (Ed) (2006). Modeling and Role-Modeling: A View From the Client’s World. TX: Unicorns Unlimited.

Erickson, H. (2006). Searching for Life Purpose: Discovering Meaning. In H. Erickson (Ed). Modeling and Role-Modeling: A View From the Client’s World. Tx: Unicorns Unlimited, pp. 5–32.

Walker, M. & Erickson, H. (2006). Mind-body-spirit relations. In H. Erickson (Ed). Modeling and Role-Modeling: A View From the Client’s World. Tx: Unicorns Unlimited, pp. 68–85.

Erickson, M., Erickson, H. & Jensen, B. (2006). Affiliated-individuation and self-actualization: Need satisfaction as prerequisite. In H. Erickson (Ed). Modeling and Role-Modeling: A View From the Client’s World. Tx: Unicorns Unlimited, pp. 182–207.

Erickson, H. (2006). Connecting. In H. Erickson (Ed). Modeling and Role-Modeling: A View From the Client’s World. Tx: Unicorns Unlimited, pp. 300–322.

Erickson, H. (2006). Nurturing growth. In H. Erickson (Ed). Modeling and Role-Modeling: A View From the Client’s World. Tx: Unicorns Unlimited, pp. 324–345.

Erickson, H. (2006). Facilitating development. In H. Erickson (Ed). Modeling and Role-Modeling: A View From the Client’s World. Tx: Unicorns Unlimited, pp. 346–390.

Clayton, D., Erickson, H., & Rogers, S. (2006). Finding meaning in our life journey. In H. Erickson (Ed). Modeling and Role-Modeling: A View From the Client’s World. Tx: Unicorns Unlimited, pp. 391–410.

Erickson, H. (2006). The healing process. In H. Erickson (Ed). Modeling and Role-Modeling: A View From the Client’s World. Tx: Unicorns Unlimited, pp. 411–443.

Erickson, H. (2002). Facilitating generativity and ego integrity: Applying Ericksonian methods to the aging population. In B.B. Geary and J.K. Zeig, (Eds) The Handbook of Ericksonian Psychotherapy. AZ: Zeig Tucker Publications.

Erickson, H. (1996). Holistic healing: Intra/Inter relations of person and environment. (Guest Editor) Issues of Mental Health Nursing Vol. 17, 3, 1996.

Erickson, H. (1991). Erickson, H. Modeling y Role-Modeling con psychophysiological problemas. Rapport. Journal of Instituto de Hipnoterapia Ericksoniana. Buenos Aires, Argentina.

Erickson, H. (1990) Theory based nursing. In Kinney, C., Erickson H. (Ed ) Modeling and Role-Modeling: Theory, Practice and Research. Society for Advancement of Modeling and Role-Modeling. Vol. 1(1), 1-27.

Erickson, H. (1990). Self-care knowledge: An exploratory study. In Kinney, C. & Erickson, H. (Ed ) Modeling and Role-Modeling: Theory, Practice and Research. Society for Advancement of Modeling and Role-Modeling. Vol. 1(1), 178-202.

Erickson, H. Modeling and role-modeling with psychophysiological problems (1990). In J.K. Zeig & Gilligan, S. (Eds.) Brief Therapy: Myths, Methods, and Metaphors New York: Brunner/Mazel, 473-491.

Kinney, C. & Erickson, H. (1990). Modeling the client's world: A way to holistic care. Issues in Mental Health Nursing. Vol. 11 (2), 93-108.

Erickson, H. & Swain, M.A. (1990). Mobilizing self-care resources: A nursing intervention for hypertension. Issues in Mental Health Nursing. Vol. 11 (3), 217-236.

Barnfather, J., Swain, MA, & Erickson, H. (1989) Evaluation of two assessment techniques. Nursing Science Quarterly. 4, 172-182.

Barnfather, J., Swain, M.A., Erickson, H. (1989). Construct validity of an aspect of the coping process: Potential adaptation to stress. Issues in Mental Health Nursing. 10, 23-40.

Erickson, H. (1988). Modeling and role modeling: Ericksonian approaches with physiological problems. In J. Zeig, & S. Langton (Eds), Ericksonian pychotherapy: The state of the art.

Erickson, H. (1986). Synthesizing clinical experiences: A step in theory development. Ann Arbor, MI: Biomedical Communications, University of Michigan.

Erickson, H. (1985, March/April). New challenges for nurses. DCCN, 99-100.

Campbell, J., Finch, D., Allport, C., Erickson, H., & Swain, M. (1985). Modeling and role-modeling: A nursing assessment format. Journal of Advanced Nursing, 10, 111-115.

Erickson, H. (1984). Political aspects of compassionate care. Published in proceedings from A Call to Create, Loyola University of Chicago, June 1–4, 1984.

Erickson, H. (1984). Self-care knowledge: Relations among the concepts support, hope, control, satisfaction with daily life and physical health status. Dissertation Abstract Erickson, H. (1983, March). Coping with new systems. Journal of Nursing Education, 132-136.

Erickson, H. C., Tomlin, E. M., & Swain, M. A. P. (1983/2010). Modeling and role-modeling: A theory and paradigm for nursing. Englewood Cliffs, NJ: Prentice-Hall) Second-ninth printing, 1988-2010; EST Co: Austin, TX.

Erickson, H., & Swain, M. A. (1982). A model for assessing potential to adapt to stress. Research in Nursing and Health, 5, 93-101.

Erickson, H. (1976). Identification of states of coping utilizing physiological and psychological data. Master’s thesis. The University of Michigan.

Selected Abstracts: Erickson, H. Caring, Comforting and Healing. Conference Proceedings. The Sixth National AJN Conference on Medical-Surgical and Geriatric Nursing. October 19, 1994.

Erickson, H., Kinney, C., Acton, G., Becker, H., Irvin, B., Jensen, B., & Miller, E. (1994). An Intervention Study: Persons with Alzheimer’s Disease and Their Caregivers. Conference Proceedings. The Fifth National Conference for the Theory of Modeling and Role-Modeling.

Erickson, H. (1993). Intervention Research with Cognitively Impaired Persons and Their Caregivers. Nursing's Challenge: Leadership in Changing Times. STTI 32 cd Biennial Convention. Indianapolis, Indiana.

Erickson, H & Kennedy, G. (1992). Viewing the world through the patient's eyes. Proceedings: Celebrating Partnerships. AACN NTI. New Orleans, Louisiana.

Erickson, H., Acton, G., Baas, L., Robinson, K., & Rossi, L. (1992). Strategies to humanize care in the ICU. Proceedings: Celebrating Partnerships. AACN NTI. New Orleans, Louisiana.

Erickson, H. (1991). The relationships among self-care knowledge, self-care resources and physical health. The Proceedings of the Fifth Annual Conference of the Southern Nursing Research Society.

Erickson, H. (1990). The McKennell model: using qualitative methods to guide instrument development. Fourth Annual Conference of the Southern Nursing Research Society. p. 115.

Erickson, H., Lock, S., & Swain, M. (1989). Continuation of the study of the self-care knowledge construct in the modeling and role-modeling theory. Advances in International Nursing Scholarship. Sigma Theta Tau International Research Congress . Taipei, Taiwan: Sigma Theta Tau International Honor Society. p. 84.

Erickson, H. (1989). Study of the self-care knowledge construct. Third Annual Conference of the Southern Nursing Research Society. p. 10.

Erickson, H. (1989). Mind-body relationships as a factor in the care of people with diabetes. Third Annual Conference of the Southern Nursing Research Society p. 47.

Erickson, H. (1985). Self-care knowledge: Relations among the concepts support, hope, control, satisfaction with life, and physical health. Social Support and Health: New Directions for Theory Development and Research. University of Rochester. pp. 208–212.

Erickson, H., & Swain, M. A. (1977). The utilization of a nursing care model for treatment of essential hypertension. Circulation. (Abstract)}
