= Veterinarian's Oath =

Oath of ethics taken by veterinarians

Upon graduation as a veterinarian, an oath may be sworn to demonstrate the graduate's dedication and commitment to their new profession. This has similarities to human doctors' Hippocratic Oath. The oath itself differs around the world.

== Americas ==
=== United States of America ===
The Veterinarian's Oath was adopted by the American Veterinary Medical Association's House of Delegates July 1969, and amended by the AVMA Executive Board, November 1999 and December 2010.

Being admitted to the profession of veterinary medicine, I solemnly swear to use my scientific knowledge and skills for the benefit of society through the protection of animal health and welfare, the prevention and relief of animal suffering, the conservation of animal resources, the promotion of public health, and the advancement of medical knowledge. I will practice my profession conscientiously, with dignity, and in keeping with the principles of veterinary medical ethics. I accept as a lifelong obligation the continual improvement of my professional knowledge and competence.

This oath is also used in Afghanistan.

=== Canada ===
The Veterinarian Oath taken by Canadian veterinarians was established by the Canadian Veterinary Medical Association in 2004 and updated in 2018. It has some minor deviations from that of the American Veterinary Medical Association.

As a member of the veterinary medical profession, I solemnly swear that I will use my scientific knowledge and skills for the benefit of society.

I will strive to:

- promote animal health and welfare,
- prevent and relieve animal suffering,
- protect the health of the public and the environment, and
- advance comparative medical knowledge.

I will perform my professional duties conscientiously, with dignity, and in keeping with the principles of veterinary medical ethics.

I will strive continuously to improve my professional knowledge and competence and to maintain the highest professional and ethical standards for myself and the profession.

Veterinarians from The University of the West Indies also swear an oath upon graduation.

== Oceania ==
=== Australia ===
Graduates of the University of Queensland and James Cook University take the following oath, as well as those in New South Wales:

I solemnly swear to practise veterinary science ethically and conscientiously for the benefit of animal welfare, animal and human health, users of veterinary services and the community.

I will endeavour to maintain my practice of veterinary science to current professional standards, and will strive to improve my skills and knowledge through continuing professional development.

I acknowledge that along with the privilege of acceptance into the veterinary profession comes community and professional responsibility.

I will maintain these principles throughout my professional life.

=== New Zealand ===
Instead of swearing a particular oath, New Zealand veterinarians follow a 7-point Code of Professional Conduct.

== Europe ==
=== United Kingdom ===
British veterinarians must declare their oath in order to have the right to practice veterinary medicine in the UK:

I promise and solemnly declare that I will pursue the work of my profession with integrity and accept my responsibilities to the public, my clients, the profession and the Royal College of Veterinary Surgeons and that ABOVE ALL my constant endeavour will be to ensure the health and welfare of animals committed to my care.

=== Ireland ===
According to One Welfare, the veterinarian oath in Ireland is:

I solemnly and sincerely declare that I will, to the best of my ability, uphold the honour, dignity and integrity of the veterinary profession, that I will promote the welfare of animals entrusted to my care and that I will abide by the rulings of the Veterinary Council.

=== Hungary ===
According to the World Small Animal Veterinary Association, the Hungarian veterinarian oath is:

I, [NAME], swear that as a veterinarian, I will act at all times according to the professional and ethical standards of veterinary medicine. I will use the knowledge acquired during my studies to prevent and cure diseases and to benefit the well-being of my patients. I will avoid causing unnecessary pain to animals and will be conscious of protecting the biodiversity of our natural environment. I will keep my knowledge and skills up-to-date by continuous education to meet the requirements of future development in my field. I accept it my duty to recognize the laws and regulations regarding veterinary practice and public health in the country I shall be active as a veterinarian. I will strive to enhance the reputation of the veterinary profession and my alma mater, the Faculty of Veterinary Science, Budapest. (So help me God!)

== Asia ==
=== India ===
According to the World Small Animal Veterinary Association, the Indian veterinarian oath is:

Being admitted to the profession of Veterinary medicine, I solemnly swear to use my scientific knowledge and skill for the benefit of society through the protection of animal health and welfare, the prevention and relief of animal suffering, the conservation of livestock resources, the promotion of public health and the advancement of medical knowledge. I will practice my profession conscientiously, with dignity and in keeping with the principles of veterinary medical ethics. I accept as a lifelong obligation the continual improvement of my professional knowledge and competence

=== Indonesia ===
According to the World Small Animal Veterinary Association, the Indonesian veterinarian oath is:

Upon the acceptance of myself into the profession of veterinary medicine, I swear:

- I will devote myself, my knowledge and skills to the improvement of quality, compassionate for the welfare of animals and the protection of the public;
- I will use the knowledge and skills I have is based on humanity and compassion to animals;
- I will give primary consideration to healing, health and well-being of my patients, the highest interests of the client by staking the honour of the

profession and myself;

- I will always uphold the honour and the noble traditions of the profession to uphold the Veterinary Profession Code

I pronounce this oath before Almighty God.

=== Korea ===
According to the World Small Animal Veterinary Association, the Korean veterinarian oath is:

I, as a veterinarian, hereby solemnly swear that:

I will contribute for the care of animal health, for the relief of pains from disease, and for the promotion of public health, with my entire professional veterinary knowledge, and that

I will accept as a lifelong obligation to study without cease both the conservation of livestock resources and the advancement of veterinary skills for the benefits of the national society, and that

I will practice my veterinary profession, faithfully and conscientiously, maintaining the dignity of the job and keeping the General Principles of Veterinary Ethics.

=== Sri Lanka ===
According to the World Small Animal Veterinary Association, the Sri Lankan veterinarian oath is:

Being admitted to the profession of veterinary medicine, I solemnly swear to use my scientific knowledge and skills for the benefit of society through the

protection of animal health, the relief of animal suffering, the conservation of livestock resources, the promotion of public health and the advancement of medical knowledge.

I will practice my profession conscientiously, with dignity and in keeping with the principles of veterinary medical ethics.

I accept as a lifelong obligation the continual improvement of my professional knowledge and competence.

=== Taiwan ===
According to the World Small Animal Veterinary Association, the Taiwanese veterinarian oath is:

Having chosen veterinary medicine to be my profession, I hereby solemnly swear that I will treat my teachers with reverence and my colleagues with comity; that I will devote my professional knowledge and skills to the respect of animal life, the protection of animal health, the relief of animal suffering, the conservation of livestock resources, the promotion of public health and the advancement of medical knowledge; and that I will collaborate with human medical professionals for the benefit of society. I will strive to improve relations between man and animals, societal harmony, and the protection of our environment, and to maintain the highest professional and ethical standards for the profession. I will practice my profession with good conscience, dignity, morality, and professional ethics. I will endeavor continuously to advance my professional knowledge and competence. Upon my beliefs stated above, I hereby solemnly and voluntarily pledge my oath.

=== Singapore ===
Singaporean veterinarians follow a Code of Ethics, instead of swearing a specific oath.

== Middle East ==
=== Iran ===
According to the World Small Animal Veterinary Association, the Iranian veterinarian oath is:

Now that I start my way in veterinary practice, I swear to protect the health and reduce the suffering of animals, conserve resources of animal life, improve public health, and promote the veterinary science, prevention and treatment of zoonotic diseases, using my practical knowledge and skills in order to benefit

society.

I am always conscious of and abide by my professional duties, veterinary science, ethics, and honour. I will always be committed to further increasing my professional knowledge and to be diligent in increasing my competence

== Africa ==
=== Kenya ===
According to the World Small Animal Veterinary Association, the Kenyan veterinarian oath is:

I, [NAME], being admitted to the profession of veterinary medicine, solemnly swear/affirm that I shall use my scientific knowledge and skills for the benefit of society through the protection of animal health, the relief of animal suffering, the conservation of livestock resources, the promotion of public health and shall at all times support the advancement of veterinary medical knowledge. I shall practice my profession conscientiously with dignity. And in keeping with the principles of veterinary medical ethics, I accept as a lifelong obligation the continual improvement of my professional knowledge and competence.

== Global scope ==
Members of the World Small Animal Veterinary Association swear an oath "which supports our national declarations and reflects the mission of our global veterinary community":

As a global veterinarian, I will use my knowledge and skills for the benefit of our society through the protection of animal welfare and health, the prevention and relief of animal suffering, and the promotion of One Health. I will practice my profession with dignity in a correct and ethical manner, which includes lifelong learning to improve my professional competence.

== Veterinary technicians ==
Paraveterinary workers in the US may swear an oath:

I solemnly dedicate myself to aiding animals and society by providing excellent care and services for animals, by alleviating animal suffering, and by promoting public health. I accept my obligations to practice my profession conscientiously and with sensitivity, adhering to the profession’s Code of Ethics, and furthering my knowledge and competence through a commitment to lifelong learning.

== See also ==
- Veterinary ethics
- Hippocratic Oath
