= Elnora Daniel =

American nurse and educator (1941–2024)

Elnora Delores Belle Daniel (née Belle; November 19, 1941 – March 4, 2024) was an American nurse and educator. She served as president of Chicago State University from 1998 to 2008. In 1986, she became the first African American president of the Virginia State Board of Nursing.

== Early life and education ==
Elnora Delores Belle was born in Oxford, North Carolina on November 19, 1941. After graduating from high school in 1959, she enrolled in North Carolina A&T State University, earning a bachelor's degree in 1964. In 1968, she earned a Master of Education degree from Columbia University. In 1972, she enrolled in the College of William and Mary, and later earned a Doctor of Education degree from Columbia University in 1976. Her doctoral dissertation was Essential Elements of Individualized Instruction: As Perceived by Faculty Members and Learners in a Baccalaureate Nursing Education Program.

== Career ==
After earning her bachelor's degree, Daniel worked as a nurse at the New York Medical Center. She joined the faculty of Hampton University in 1968, and became Dean of the School of Nursing in 1980. In 1985, she Dean of Hampton's Interdisciplinary Nursing Centre for Health and Wellness. In 1986, she became the second African American member of the VIrginia State Board of Nursing, and the first African American to serve as its president. Daniel was appointed Vice President of Academic Affairs at Hampton in 1991, and became Provost of Hampton University in 1995.

Daniel became the president of Chicago State University in 1998, a position she held for ten years. She resigned from CSU effective June 30, 2008, having faced criticism for her spending practices. One example was the publication of a coffee table book in her own honor. The publication of the book cost $18,000, which was charged to her official account as university president. In a state audit, it was also revealed that Daniel had spent more than $15,000 of university funds travelling to a leadership conference on a cruise ship with five family members.

She returned to Hampton in 2008 as a Special Assistant to the President for Research.

In addition to her career as an academic administrator, Daniel worked with the W.K. Kellogg Foundation as a healthcare consultant for some African nations, including Swaziland and Zimbabwe.

Daniel also served as a nurse in the United States military. In 1972, she became a Captain of the U.S. Air Force Reserve, and in 1979, she transferred to the U.S. Army Nurse Corps, and eventually achieved the rank of Colonel. Daniel served as Chief Nurse, 18th Field Hospital in Virginia before being transferred to found a training school at the 2076th U.S. Army Reserve School in Wilmington, Delaware. In 2001, she was interviewed by the Library of Congress as part of the Veterans History Project.

== Death ==
Elora D. Daniel died on March 4, 2024.
