= Nursing Science Quarterly =

- Language: English
- Edited by: Rosemarie Rizzo Parse

Publication details
- History: 1988-present
- Publisher: SAGE Publications
- Frequency: Quarterly

Standard abbreviations
- ISO 4: Nurs. Sci. Q.

Indexing
- ISSN: 0894-3184 (print); 1552-7409 (web)
- OCLC no.: 299858832

Links
- Journal homepage; Online access; Online archive

Nursing Science Quarterly is a quarterly peer-reviewed academic journal that publishes papers in the field of nursing. The editor-in-chief is Rosemarie Rizzo Parse (Loyola University Chicago). The journal was established in 1988 and is published by SAGE Publications. Nursing Science Quarterly is devoted exclusively to the enhancement of nursing knowledge. The major purpose of the journal is to publish original manuscripts focusing on nursing theory development, nursing theory–guided practice, and quantitative and qualitative research related to existing nursing frameworks.
