= Uniform =

Similar clothing worn by a group of people

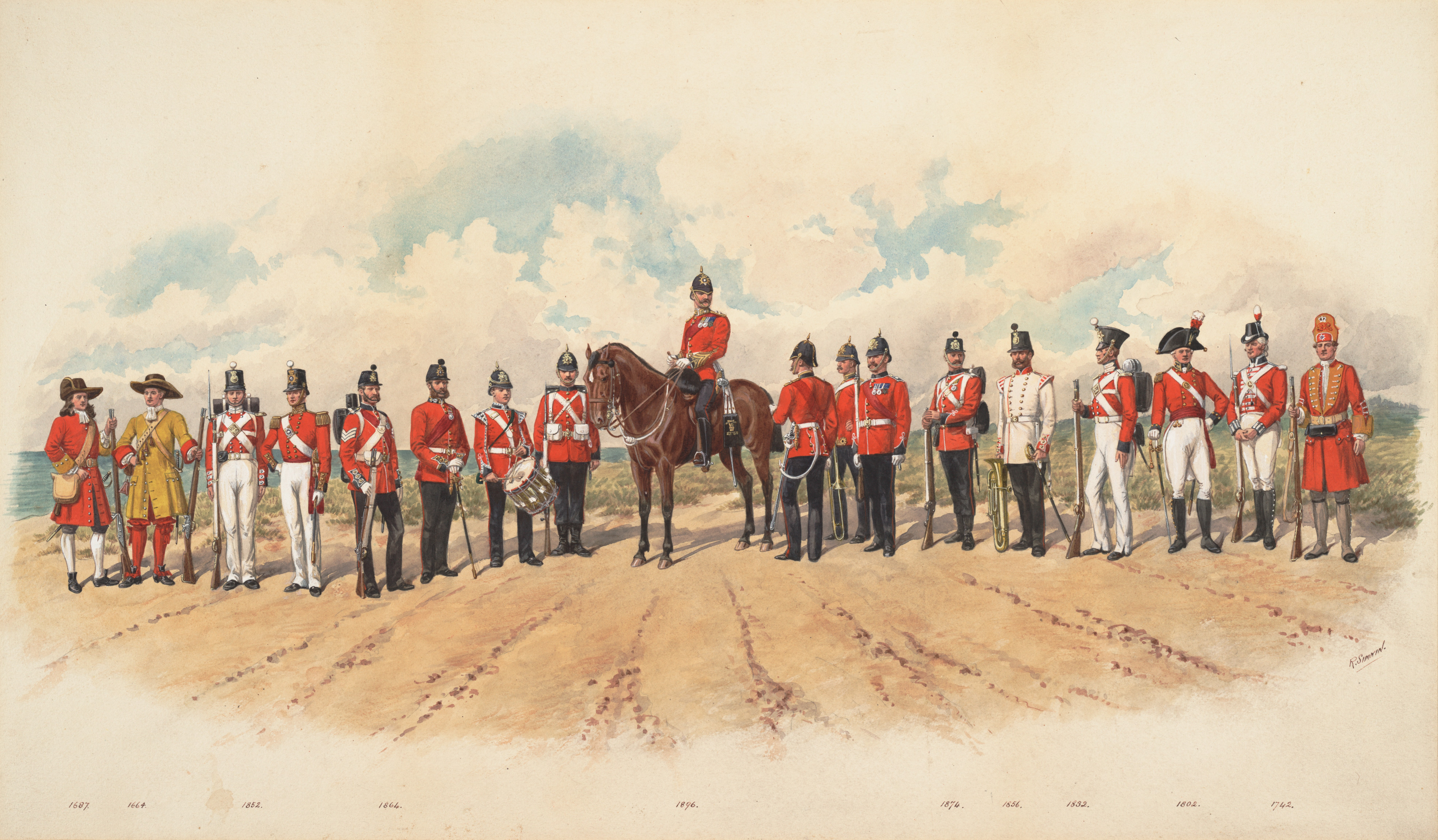
The uniforms of the Royal Marines from 1664 to 1896

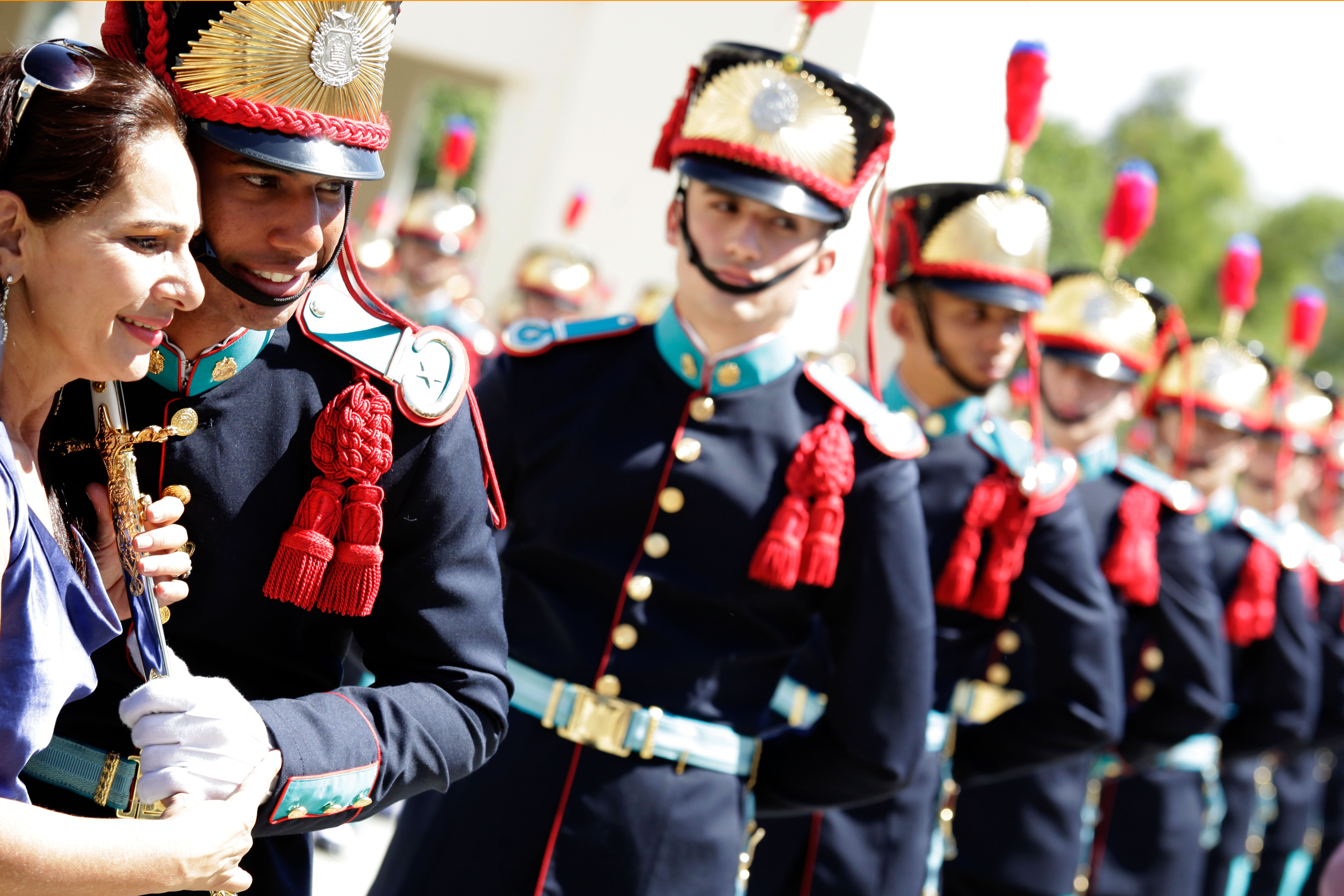
Brazilian cadets in 2013 wearing full dress uniform

A uniform is a variety of costume worn by members of an organization while usually participating in that organization's activity. Modern uniforms are most often worn by armed forces and paramilitary organizations such as police, emergency services, security guards, in some workplaces and schools, and by inmates in prisons. In some countries, some other officials also wear uniforms in their duties; such is the case of the Commissioned Corps of the United States Public Health Service or the French prefects. For some organizations, such as police, it may be illegal for non-members to wear the uniform.

== Etymology ==
From the Latin unus (meaning one), and forma (meaning form).

== Variants ==
=== Corporate and work uniforms ===
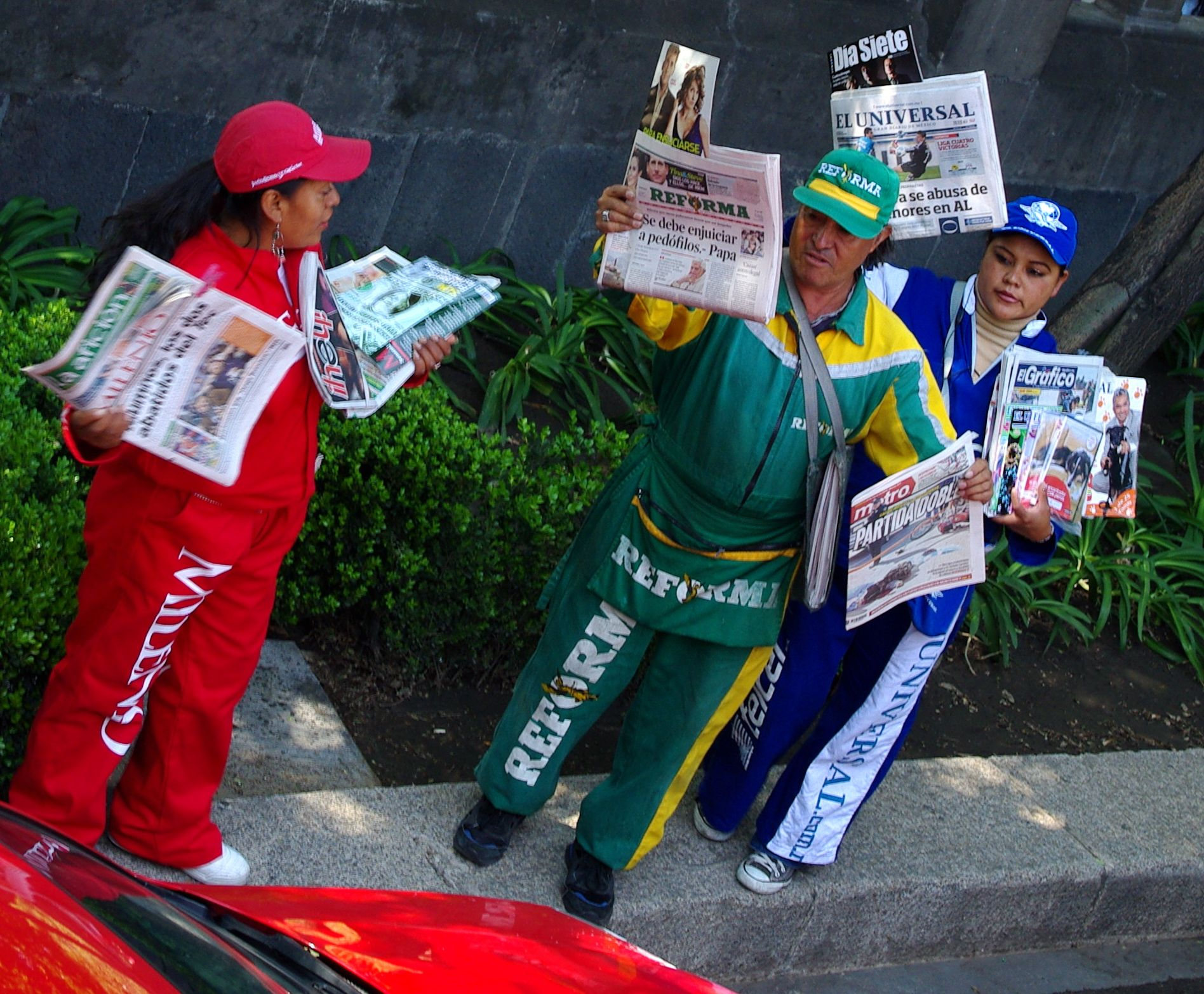
Uniformed newspaper vendors in Mexico City. Employers in some workplaces require their employees to wear a uniform.

Workers sometimes wear uniforms or corporate clothing of one nature or another. Workers required to wear a uniform may include retail workers, bank and post-office workers, public-security and health-care workers, blue-collar employees, personal trainers in health clubs, instructors in summer camps, lifeguards, janitors, public-transit employees, towing- and truck-drivers, airline employees and holiday operators, and bar, restaurant and hotel employees. The use of uniforms in commercial or public-service organizations often reflects an effort in branding and in developing a standard corporate image; it also has important effects on the employees required to wear uniforms.

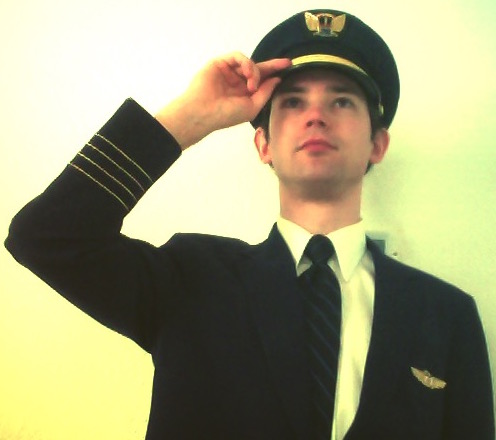
An airline pilot in uniform.

The term uniform may be misleading because employees are not always fully uniform in appearance and may not always wear attire provided by the organization, while still representing the organization in their attire. Academic work on organizational dress by Rafaeli & Pratt (1993) referred to uniformity (homogeneity) of dress as one dimension, and conspicuousness as a second. Employees all wearing black, for example, may appear conspicuous and thus represent the organization even though their attire is uniform only in the color of their clothing, not in its features. Pratt & Rafaeli, (1997) described struggles between employees and management about organizational dress as struggles about deeper meanings and identities that dress represents. And Pratt & Rafaeli (2001) described dress as one of the larger set of symbols and artifacts in organizations, which coalesce into a communication grammar.

=== Armed forces and security ===
A Russian honor guard wearing their full dress uniforms. Full dress is a formal uniform typically worn in ceremonies.

Military uniform is the standardised costume worn by members of the armed forces and paramilitaries of various nations. Military dress and military styles have gone through great changes over the centuries from colourful and elaborate to utilitarian camouflage uniforms for field and battle purposes. Military uniforms in the form of standardised and distinctive dress, intended for identification and display, are typically a sign of organised military forces equipped by a central authority. Most military forces have developed several different uniform types.

Military personnel in most armed forces and some civilian officials may wear some or all of the following: combat uniform, service dress, dress uniform, full dress uniform, mess dress.

=== Medical workers ===
Uniforms can distinguish various categories of staff in medical institutions: doctors, surgeons, nurses, ancillary staff and volunteers.

Traditional female nurses' uniforms resemble uniforms (habits) worn by religious orders.

Equipment - notably stethoscopes - worn like a badge of office, may accompany or replace medical uniforms.

=== Educational ===
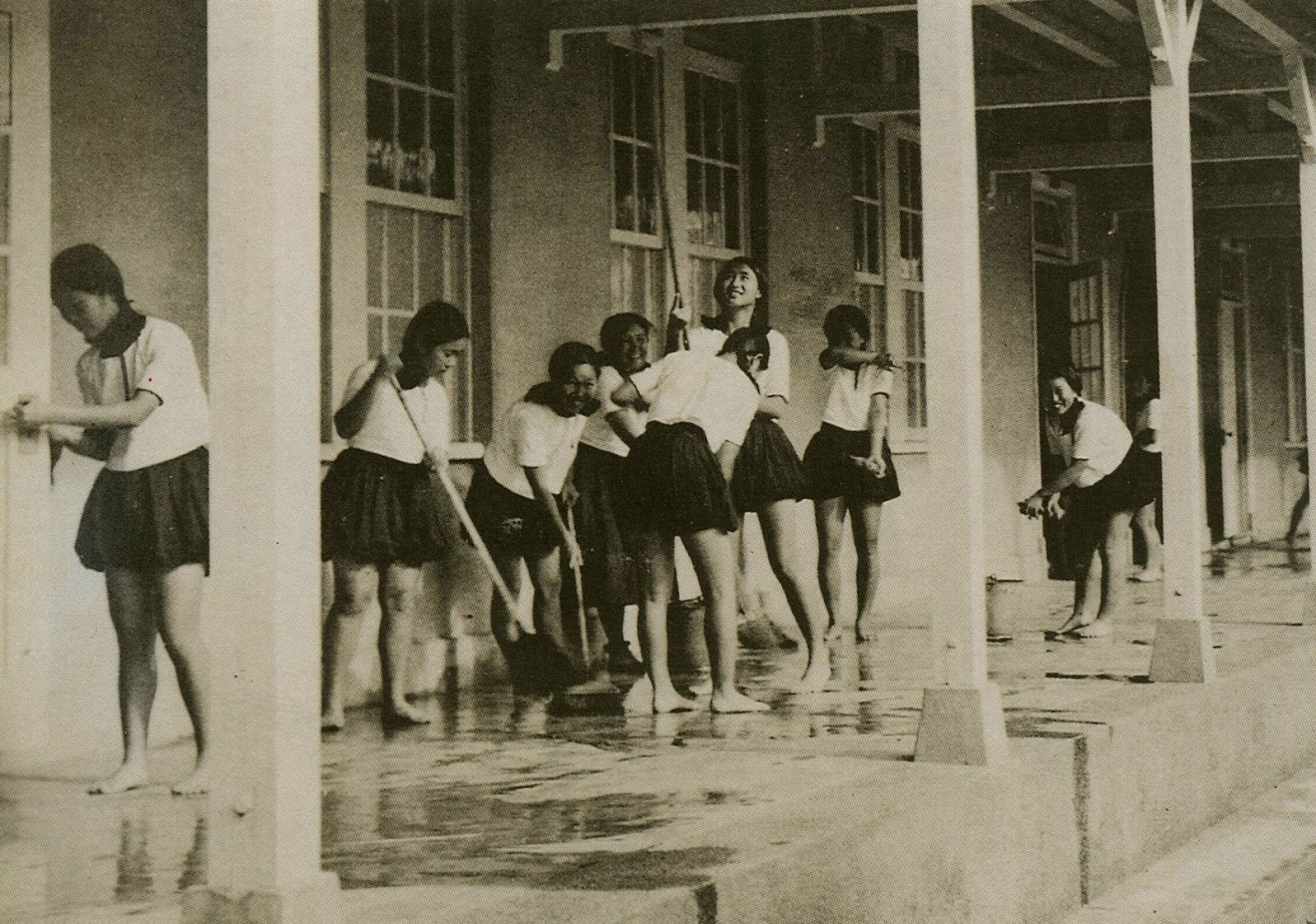
Taiwan schoolgirls in uniform during the time of Japanese rule, 1927.

Uniforms are required for students in many schools in different countries. School uniforms vary from a standard issue T-shirt to rigorous requirements for many items of formal wear at private schools. School uniforms are in place in many public schools as well.

Countries where mandatory school uniforms are common include Japan, South Korea, Hong Kong, Thailand, India, Australia, UAE, Singapore, Albania, Philippines, some schools in Taiwan, New Zealand, South Africa, Indonesia and the United Kingdom, among many other places. In some countries, uniform types vary from school to school, in the United Kingdom, many pupils between 11 and 16 of age wear a blazer, tie and trousers for boys and blouse, tie and trousers, skirt, or culottes for girls. The ties tend to have a set pattern or a logo embroidered representing the school, and jackets will usually carry a badge on the breast pocket with the school's name, coat of arms, and motto or emblem. Children in many British state primary schools will have a uniform jumper and/or polo shirt with the school name and logo.

Some universities in the DPRK require students to wear uniforms.

=== Diplomats ===
From about 1800 to after the Second World War, diplomats from most countries (and often senior non-military officials generally) wore official uniforms at public occasions. Such uniforms are now retained by only a few diplomatic services, and are seldom worn.

=== Police ===
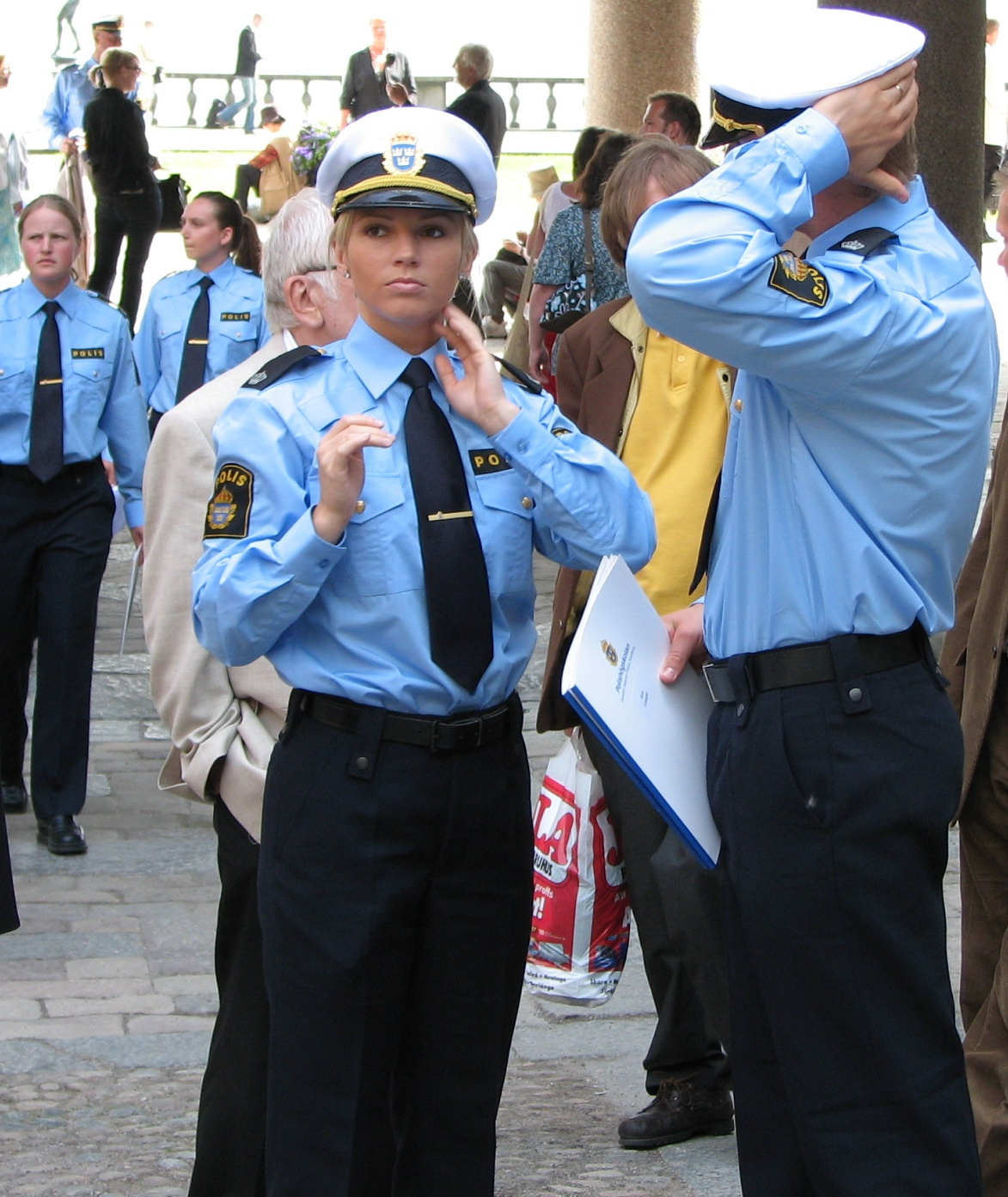
A uniformed police officer in Sweden. The police often wear uniforms to distinguish themselves in public.

Members of the police in every country have a uniform for identification as law-enforcement personnel or agents. They are distinguished from the public by the uniform the police wear during overt policing activity. Usually each country has its own different police uniform.

Contrast plainclothes law enforcement and undercover operations.

=== Sports ===
Most, if not all, sports teams also wear uniforms, made in the team's distinctive colors. In individual sports like tennis and golf, players may choose any clothing design allowed by the competition rules.

To prevent the confusion (for officials, players, and fans) that might result from two opposing teams wearing uniforms (kits) with similar colors, teams have different variations for "home" and "away" games, where typically one is dark and the other is light. In the four major North American sports leagues, one of the two uniforms is almost always predominantly white, and each league except for the National Basketball Association (NBA) has a rule to determine which team should normally wear its white uniform. Customarily, National Football League (NFL) and National Hockey League (NHL) teams wear their color uniforms for home games. By contrast, Major League Baseball (MLB) teams wear their white uniforms for home games. The NBA traditionally required home teams to wear white, or at least a light color, but as of the 2017–18 season allows home teams to wear any uniform color, mandating only that away teams wear a color that sufficiently contrasts with the home team's choice. These rules are not strictly enforced, however, for any of the four major professional sports leagues in North America. Some NFL teams, most notably the Dallas Cowboys, prefer to wear their white jerseys for home games. When Joe Gibbs was the head coach of the Washington Redskins — first from 1981 to 1992, and again from 2004 to 2007 — they exclusively wore white jerseys at home games. In the United Kingdom, especially in football, the terms "kit" or "strip" (as in 'football kit') are more common.

=== Domestic workers ===
Domestic workers are often required by their employers-managers to wear a uniform.

=== Prison ===
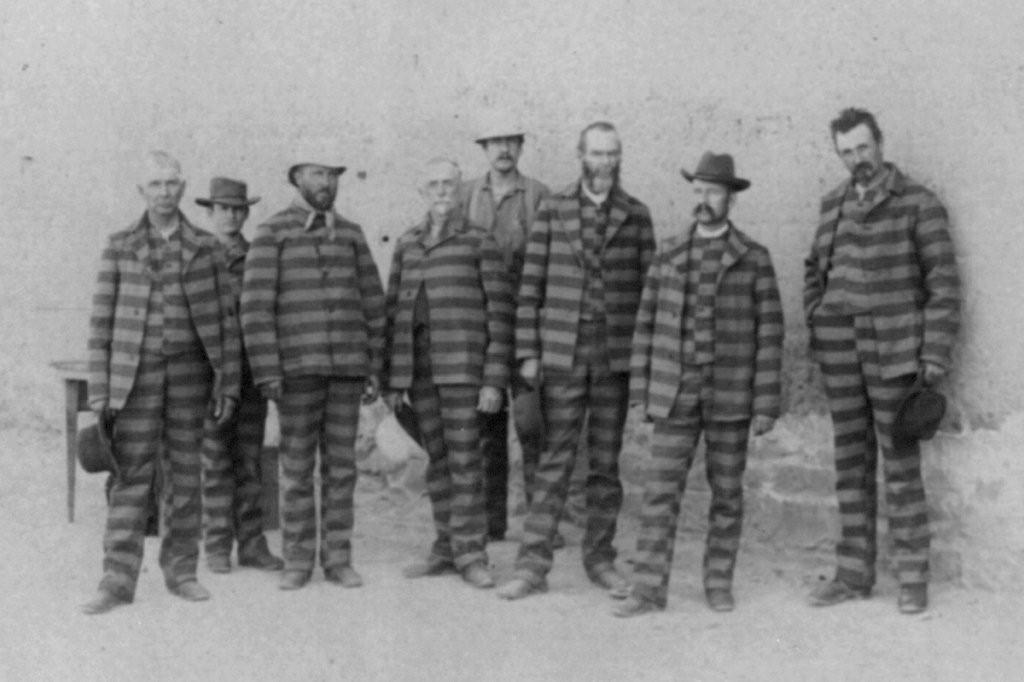
Prisoners in Utah (c. 1885) wearing striped prison uniforms. Prisons often require inmates to wear uniforms.

A prison uniform is any uniform worn by individuals incarcerated in a prison, jail or similar facility of detention.

=== Beautician ===
The beauticians use uniforms to protect their skin from harmful chemicals and acid. These chemical resistant and water proof uniforms are not only safe to work in but also provide a professional, polished appearance throughout the day.

=== Scouting ===
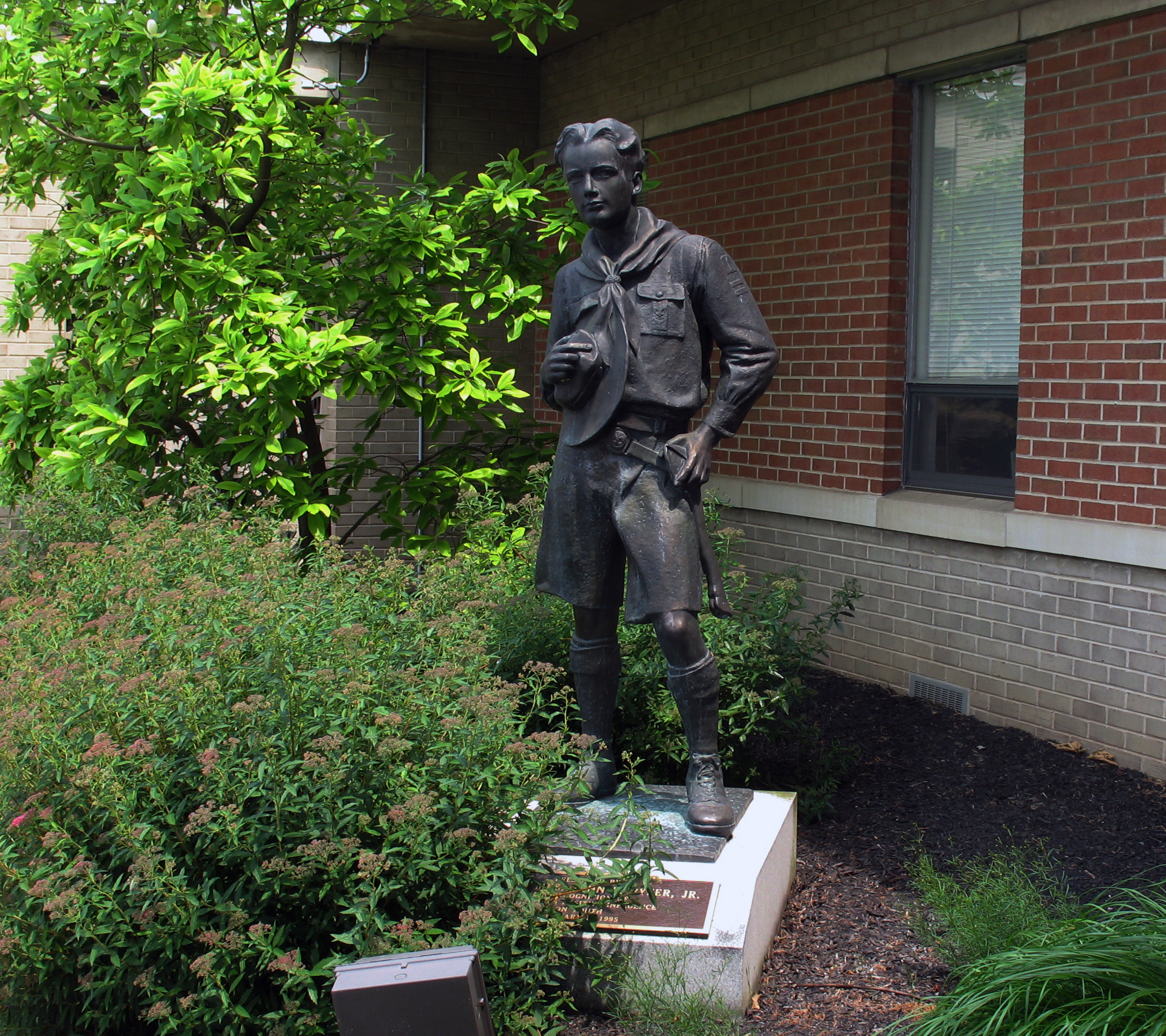
Statue of a Boy Scout in uniform. The Scout uniform is a specific characteristic of scouting used in most of their events.

The Scout uniform is a specific characteristic of the Scouting movement, in the words of Baden-Powell at the 1937 World Jamboree, "it covers the differences of country and race and makes all feel that they are members one with another of one World Brotherhood". The original uniform, which has created a familiar image in the public eye, consisted of a khaki button-up shirt, shorts and a broad-brimmed campaign hat. Baden-Powell himself wore shorts since being dressed like the youth contributed to reducing perceived "distance" between the adult and the young person. Nowadays, uniforms are frequently blue, orange, red, or green, and shorts are replaced by long pants in areas where the culture calls for modesty, and in winter weather. The campaign hats have also been dropped in some Scouting organisations.

== Buttons ==
Some uniforms have specially-manufactured buttons, which, in the case of antiques, often outlast the fabric components of the uniform, and become highly collectable items. Nowadays, buttons come in different materials, shapes sizes and colors.

== Hygiene ==
In some countries or regions such as the UK, Australia or Hong Kong, the cost of cleaning one's uniform or work clothing can be partially deducted or rebated from the personal income tax, if the organization for which the person works does not have a laundry department or an outsourced commercial laundry.

== See also ==
- Costume – Wardrobe and dress in general
- Court dress – Style of clothes prescribed for courts of law
- Dress code – Clothing code based on event or occasion
- Industrial laundry – Washing of clothing and other textiles
- Political uniform – Distinctive clothing worn by members of a political movement
- Social behavior – Behavior among two or more organisms within the same species
- Uniform fetishism – Sexual fetishism relating to uniforms
