= Nurse's cap =

Traditional nurse's hat

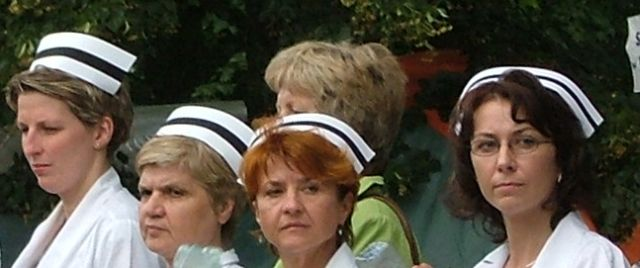
Nurses wearing their caps

A nurse's cap or nursing cap is part of the female nurse's uniform, introduced early in the history of the profession. The cap's original purpose was to keep the nurse's hair neatly in place and present a modest appearance. Male nurses do not wear caps.

In some schools, a capping ceremony presents new nursing students their caps before beginning their clinical (hospital) training.

== History ==
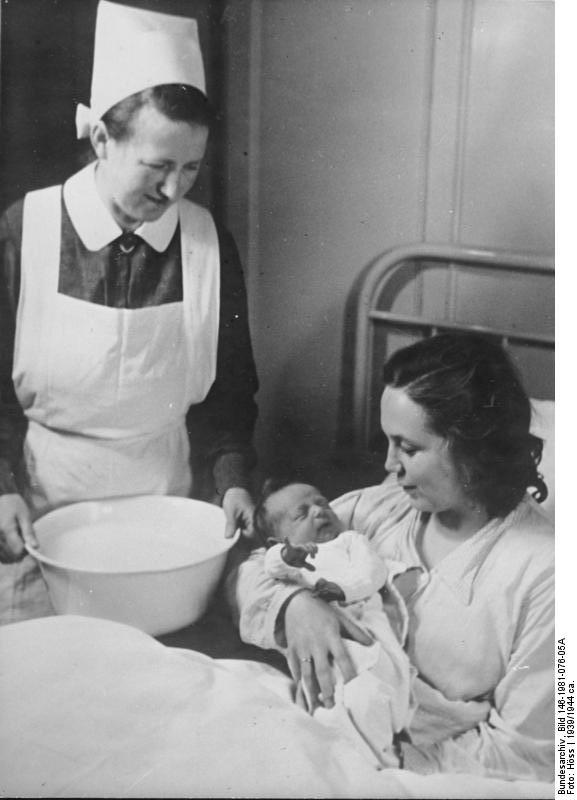
The German nurse in this 1939 photo wears a heavily starched nurse's cap.

The nurse's cap originated from a group of women in the early Christian era, called "deaconesses." These women were distinguished from other women during this time by white coverings worn on their heads. This particular head covering was worn to show that this group of women worked in the service of caring for the sick. Originally, this head covering was more of a veil, but it later evolved into a white cap during the Victorian era. It was during this era that women were required to keep their heads covered. The cap worn was hood-shaped with a ruffle around the face and tied under the chin, similar to cleaning ladies of that day. Long hair was fashionable during the Victorian era, so the cap kept the nurse's hair up and out of her face, as well as keeping it from becoming soiled.

The nurse's cap was derived from the nun's habit and developed over time into two types:

- A long cap, that covers much of the nurse's hair, and
- A short cap, that sits atop the nurse's hair (common in North America and the United Kingdom).

The nursing cap was originally used by Florence Nightingale in the 1800s.

Different styles of caps were used to depict the seniority of the nurse, the frillier and longer the more senior the nurse.

== Advantages ==
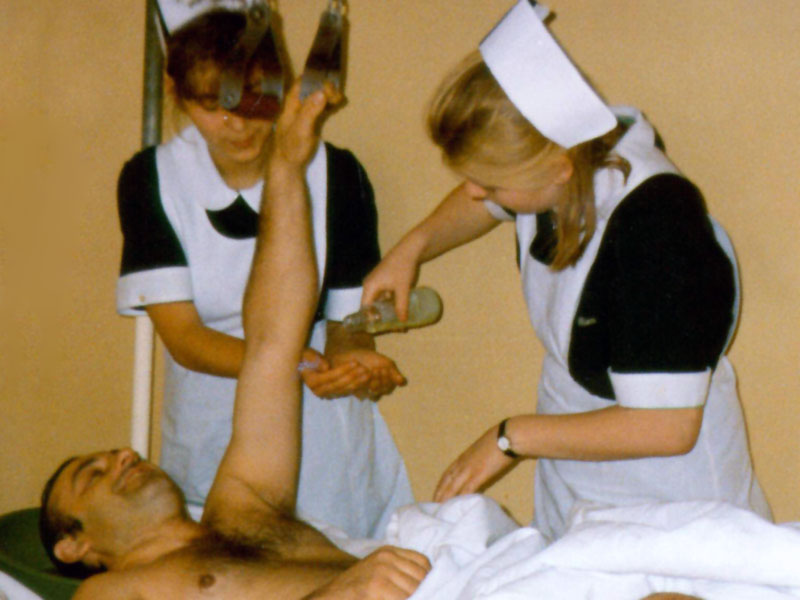
Polish nurses, wearing a uniform that includes a nursing cap, care for a patient in 1993.

The nursing cap is a nearly universally recognized symbol of nursing. It allows patients to quickly identify a nurse in the hospital from other members of the health team. Additionally, some designs of caps serve the same function as hair nets.

== Disadvantages ==
Some claim the cap is a potential carrier of bacteria and other disease-causing pathogens that could then be transmitted from patient to patient. However, such incidents can be prevented when infection control procedures are followed.

== Standardized school caps ==
Around 1874, the Bellevue Hospital School of Nursing in New York City adopted a special nursing cap as a way to identify nurses who had graduated from Bellevue. The Bellevue cap covered the entire head except the ears, and can be compared to a current ski hat, although it was made out of white linen and had fringe around the bottom (put simply, it resembled an upside-down cupcake wrapper, with a fringe around the bottom of the opening). As the number of nursing schools increased, so did the need for unique caps. Each nursing school decided to design their own style of nurse's cap. Some became very elaborate and some were even different shapes. Because each school had their own cap, it became very easy to determine from which school the nurse had graduated. It was common for a black stripe (usually a black velvet ribbon) on the cap to signify a Registered Nurse. In some regions, two thinner stripes were used to signify the award of a Bachelor's of Science in nursing (BSN). The caps needed to be washed regularly and the black stripe(s) needed to be easy to remove and reattach. Water-soluble lubricants such as KY jelly become solid when dried and were plentiful in hospitals. Nurses often used a thin layer of these lubricants applied to the back of the ribbon to attach stripes to their caps.

== Since the 1980s ==
From a global perspective, the nurses' cap continues to be widely used. However, the use of the nurses' cap had begun to slowly decline in Western Europe and North America by the late 1960s. The use of nurses' caps in the medical facilities of the United States all but disappeared by the late 1980s with the near-universal adoption of scrubs.

In areas where healthcare facilities no longer required their nurses to wear nurse's caps, nursing schools eliminated the cap as a mandatory part of student uniforms. In addition, with the growth of technology in the healthcare setting, some felt that the nurse's caps were an obstacle for nurses wearing them, while others disagreed. With the rapid growth of the number of men in nursing, some also felt a need for a unisex uniform, while others saw no difficulty with gender-specific uniforms as is the case in many uniformed professions. However, nurses' caps can still be found in many developing and developed nations. Japan and South Korea are examples of developed countries with near-universal use of the nurses' cap. It is also common for students of nursing to have their graduation portraits taken while wearing nurses' caps.

In countries where the nursing cap is no longer required as a part of a nurse's uniform, it still holds the same significance that it did during the time of Florence Nightingale. The nursing cap symbolizes the goal of the nurse, which is to provide "service to those in need." Furthermore, the cap is a sign of the industry's ageless values of dedication, honesty, wisdom, and faith.

== See also ==
- Beret
- Cap
- Coif
- List of hat styles
- Nightcap (garment)
- Scrubs (clothing)
- Pinning ceremony, a custom for nursing students who have completed their course of study
