= Nursing pin =

Clothing accessories for nurses

A nursing pin is a type of badge, usually made of metal such as gold or silver, which is worn by nurses to identify the nursing school from which they graduated. They are traditionally presented to the newly graduated nurses by the faculty at a pinning ceremony as a symbolic welcome into the profession. Most pins have a symbolic meaning, often representing the history of the nursing program for that school of nursing.

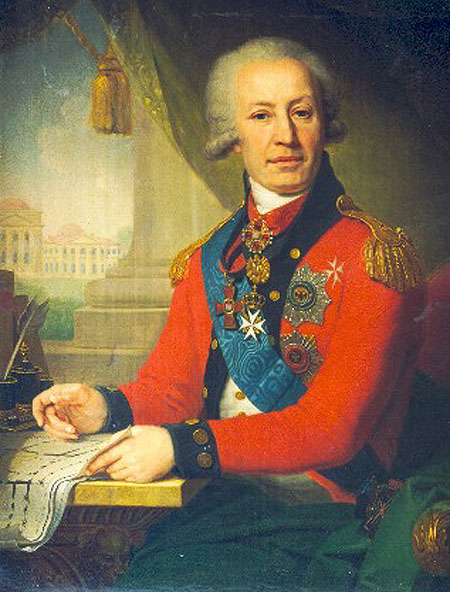
Baron Vassiliev, a 19th-century Knight Commander of the Knights Hospitaller, bearing a badge with Maltese cross design

The ancestor of the nursing pin is the Maltese cross. Some significant historical contributors to the foundation of hospital standards involved in using the Maltese cross were the Knights Hospitaller and Order of Saint Lazarus, pioneers of communicable disease care, such as leprosy, syphilis, and other chronic skin diseases during their period, and established one of a few hospitals in the territories of their reign. As the Renaissance period progressed, the use of the symbol has evolved into family coat of arms, then given to those who were providers of exclusive services. Such pins were then awarded to nurses who were needed by society during periods of spread of uncontrolled illnesses during the early period, and to recognize them as nurses who are educated, trained and experienced in the said field.

== Nurse's pins today ==
Modern designs of nurses' pins have evolved through time. The Maltese cross, in some nursing educational institutions, has not been incorporated in their pins. Instead, their own seal or logo, such as that of their nursing school, nursing organization or university affiliation is used. The pin is still worn as part of nurses' uniforms today, in such cases, before or even after they graduate from their respective nursing schools and work for medical institutions, such as hospitals and health and wellness centers.

== Nursing symbols ==
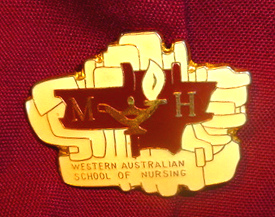
Mental health pin showing lamp

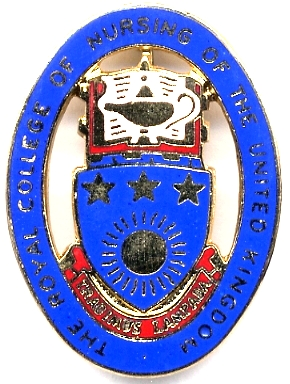
Royal College of Nursing

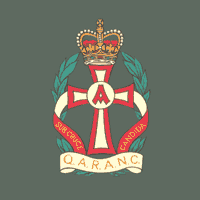
Queen Alexandra's Royal Army Nursing Corps

Pins vary widely in shape and imagery, generally about the proportions of a woman's brooch (less than 10 cm diameter). A common graphic is an old pattern oil lamp. These lamps or candles were the only lighting available before kerosene became available early in the twentieth century. There are a selection of lamps in the Florence Nightingale museum, thought to have been used in the Scutari hospital in the area known geographically as the Balkans during the war with Russia. American Poet Henry Wadsworth Longfellow wrote a poem "Saint Philomena" dedicated to the work of Florence in 1857. In this verses, Longfellow characterised Florence as "The lady with the lamp". The poem was used in fundraising for the wounded veterans of the empire. The image of the lamp used by the emerging modern nursing profession took hold.

Another common graphic found on nursing pins is the Red Cross, a symbol commonly associated with the International Federation of Red Cross and Red Crescent Societies. In times past, young women who adopted the profession of nursing were accepted as nurses, particularly in overseas service roles, such as military and mission work, when they joined the red cross society. Volunteers usually had to supply their own uniforms, equipment and generally had to undertake charitable works in order to raise funds for their own passage to the area of identified need. Red cross nurses are honoured in the 1916 song Rose of no man's land but were by no means the only volunteers. Nurses were also drawn from organisations like the ancient order of deaconesses and quaker ambulance units. The situation changed during the great war, in which the contribution of nursing to the war effort was recognised in several urgent recruitment drives. As nurses were granted access to postings, commissions and pensions, amateur involvement declined.

Another symbol previously used was the sword entwined by double winged serpents. This sword of caduceus was mistakenly used by the United States medical forces in place of the wand of Asclepius (one serpent without wings on a stick), a long-standing symbol of medical doctors and physicians.

Other common symbols include

- stork and baby, legacy torch,
- fountain of youth
- religious symbols – crucifix, star of David, crescent moon.

== See also ==
- Maltese cross
- Nurse uniform
- Nursing
- Knights Hospitaller
- Order of Saint Lazarus
