= Grammer (surname) =

Grammer is a surname. Notable people with the surname include:

- Andy Grammer, American singer and songwriter
- Billy Grammer, American singer
- Camille Grammer, American television personality
- Elijah S. Grammer, American businessman and politician
- Greer Grammer, American actress
- Kelsey Grammer, American actor
- Mabel Grammer, American journalist
- Red Grammer, American singer and songwriter
- Robin Grammer Jr., American politician
- Spencer Grammer, American actress
- Tracy Grammer, American folk singer

== See also ==
- Grammer (disambiguation)
