= Pinning ceremony (nursing) =

Symbolic welcoming of nurses into the profession

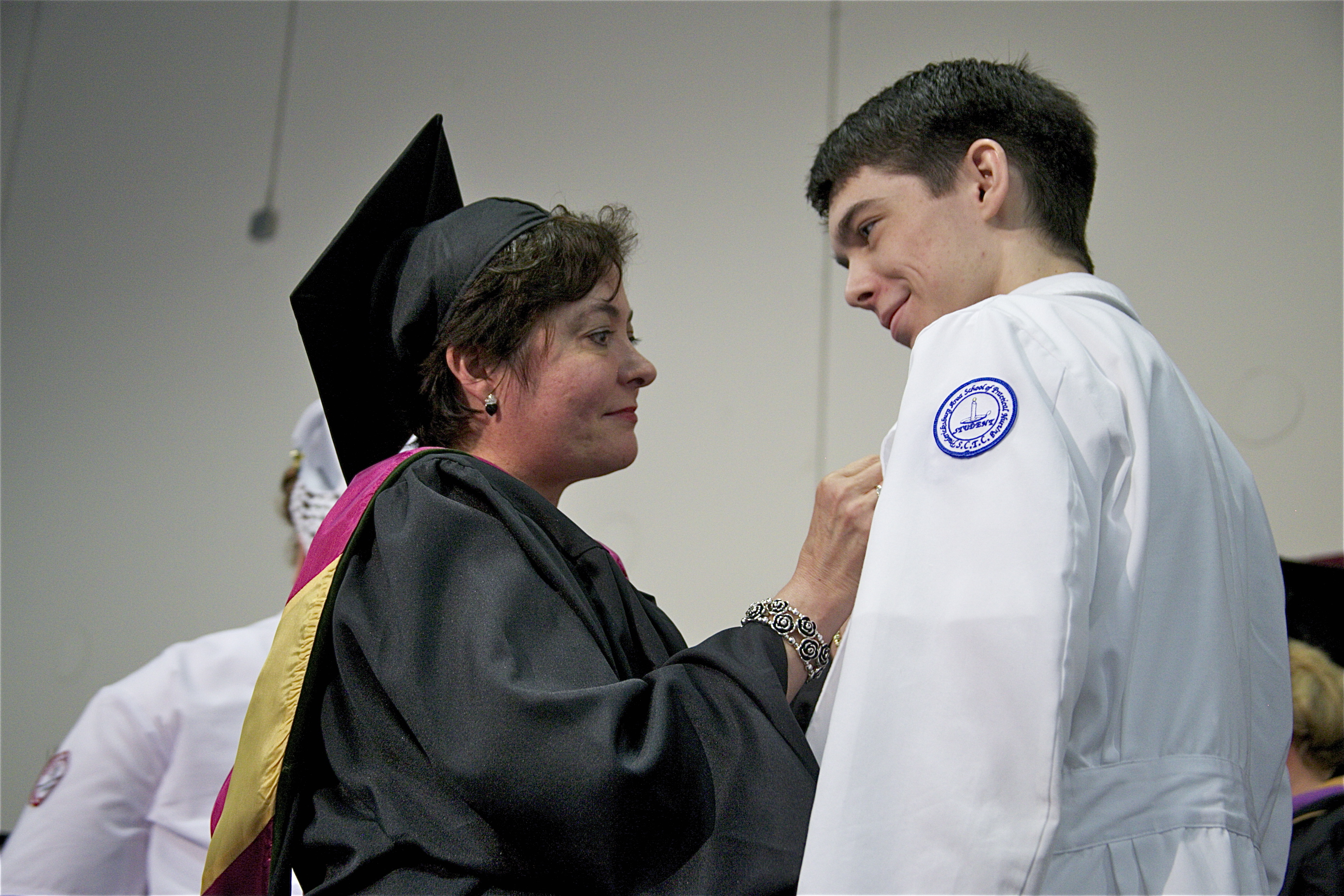
Pinning ceremony at S.C.T.C. Professional School of Nursing, Somerset, Pennsylvania, 2012

A pinning ceremony is a symbolic welcoming of newly graduated or soon-to-be graduated nurses into the nursing profession.

The history of the ceremony dates back to the Crusades in the 12th century, and later, when Queen Victoria awarded Florence Nightingale the Royal Red Cross for her service as a military nurse during the Crimean War. By 1916, pinning ceremonies had become an established tradition in both the United Kingdom and the United States, although, by the 2010s, many nursing schools in the United States had abolished them.

At pinning ceremonies, nurses are presented with nursing pins by either the faculty of their nursing school or by a person significant to them. These ceremonies also often include a candle-lighting or lamp-lighting ceremony, which commemorates Nightingale's nighttime aid to wounded soldiers by candlelight, and the reciting of the Nightingale Pledge, the International Council of Nurses Pledge, or another similar pledge.

A pinning ceremony is not a graduation, as it does not signify the completion of all criteria necessary to earn a nursing degree, although it sometimes recognizes the completion of educational requirements that enable nurses to take their state licensing examinations. Historically, a nursing pin symbolizes an educated nurse who is prepared to serve society as a healthcare professional.

== History ==
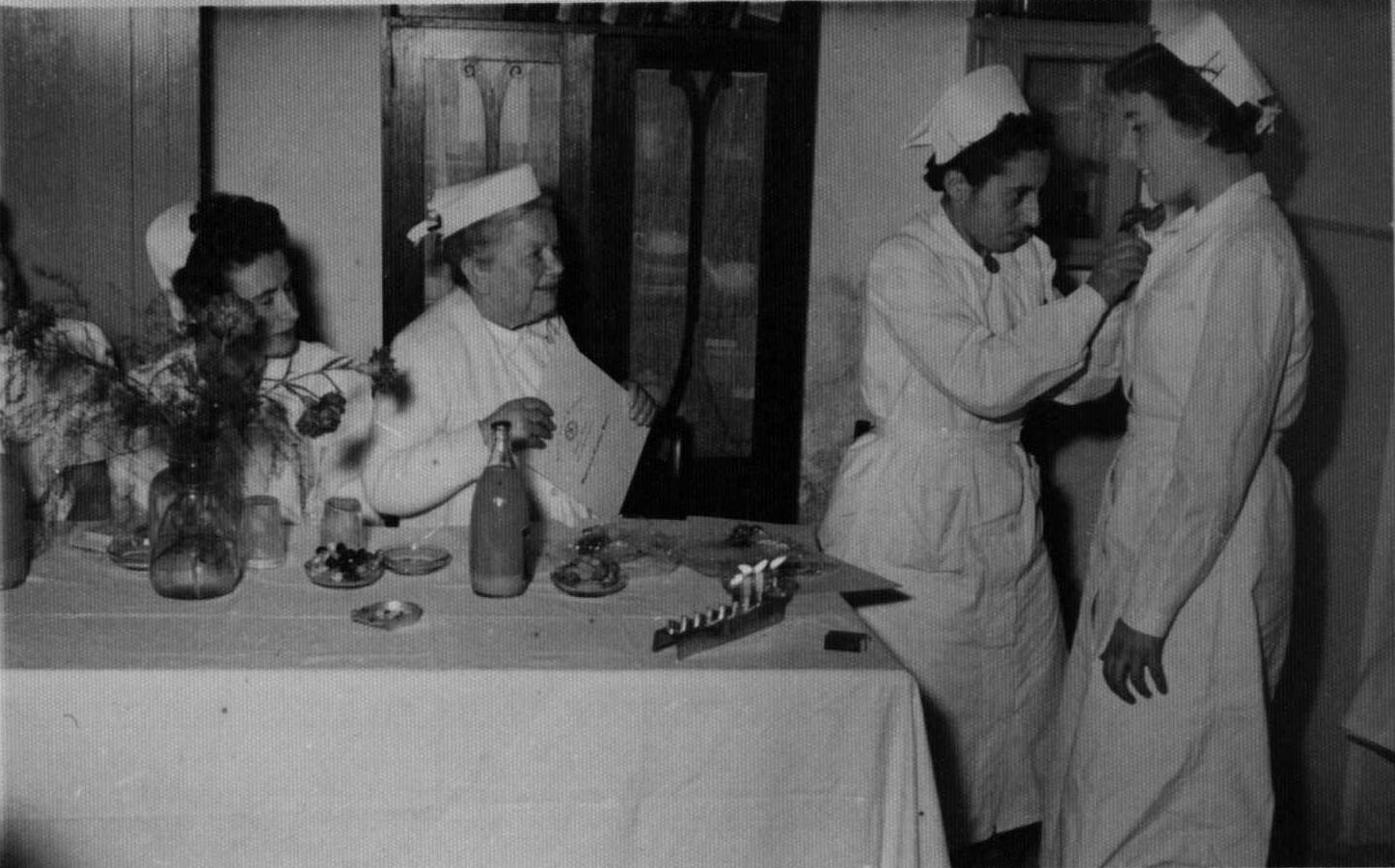
A nursing school graduate receives a nurse's pin at Shaare Zedek Hospital in Jerusalem, circa 1954. Head nurse Schwester Selma is second from the left.

The history of nursing pins dates back to the Crusades in the 12th century. Monks initiated into the Knights Hospitaller that cared for injured and ill Crusaders were given a Maltese cross, which is considered to be the first form of a badge given for nursing.

After the Crimean War, Queen Victoria awarded Florence Nightingale the Royal Red Cross for her service as a military nurse during the conflict. Nightingale later presented a somewhat similar "medal of excellence" to her outstanding nursing students. Initially, only nurses who attained exceptional grades or made remarkable contributions to practice received nursing pins, although in time pinning ceremonies came to include all nurses.

The Nightingale School of Nursing at London's St Thomas' Hospital created a badge featuring a Maltese cross that it awarded to nurses who completed their studies. The first pinning ceremony in the United States occurred at New York City's Bellevue Hospital in 1880. By 1916, pinning ceremonies at which all nursing graduates were awarded pins had become an established tradition in both the United Kingdom and the United States.

By the 2010s, many nursing schools in the United States had abolished their pinning ceremonies, often considering them out of date and unnecessary. Other nursing schools retain ceremonies that are entirely planned and funded by the students.

== Ceremony ==
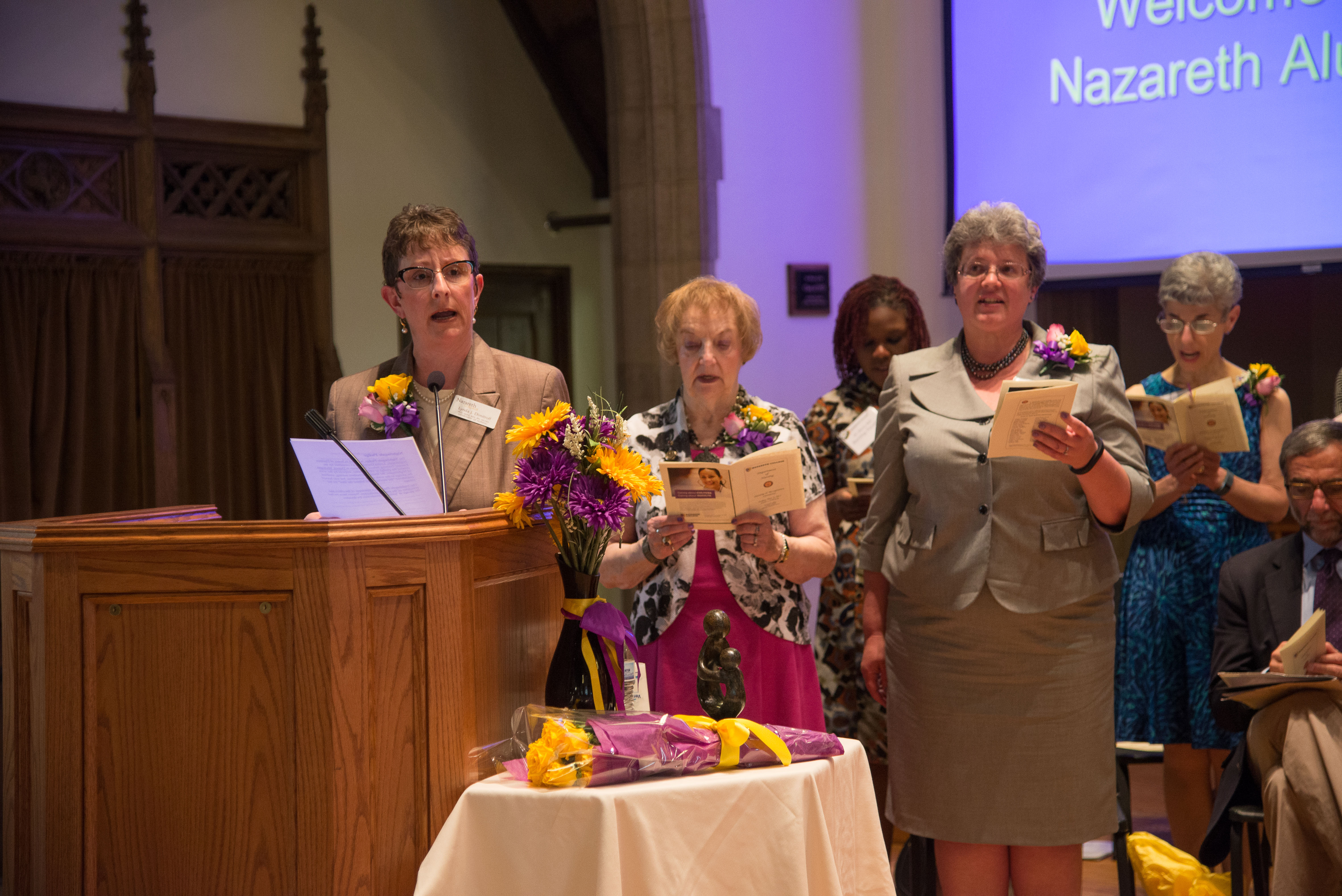
Pinning ceremony at Nazareth College, New York, 2015

A pinning ceremony is a public event involving the family and friends of nurses being recognized. The nurses often dedicate their pins to a person who has made a significant impact on their lives.

At the ceremony itself, a faculty member from the nursing school typically hands a pin to each designated significant person, who in turn places it on the nursing student who selected them. Sometimes the faculty member themselves places the pin on the nursing student. During the pinning itself, another faculty member will often read a dedication that the student has written about the person pinning them.

Pinning ceremonies also generally feature an address from a nursing faculty member and a candle-lighting or lamp-lighting ceremony, which commemorates Nightingale's nighttime aid to wounded soldiers by candlelight. The candle-lighting or lamp-lighting ceremony is often accompanied by the reciting of the Nightingale Pledge, the International Council of Nurses Pledge, or a pledge specific to an individual nursing school.

== Symbolism ==
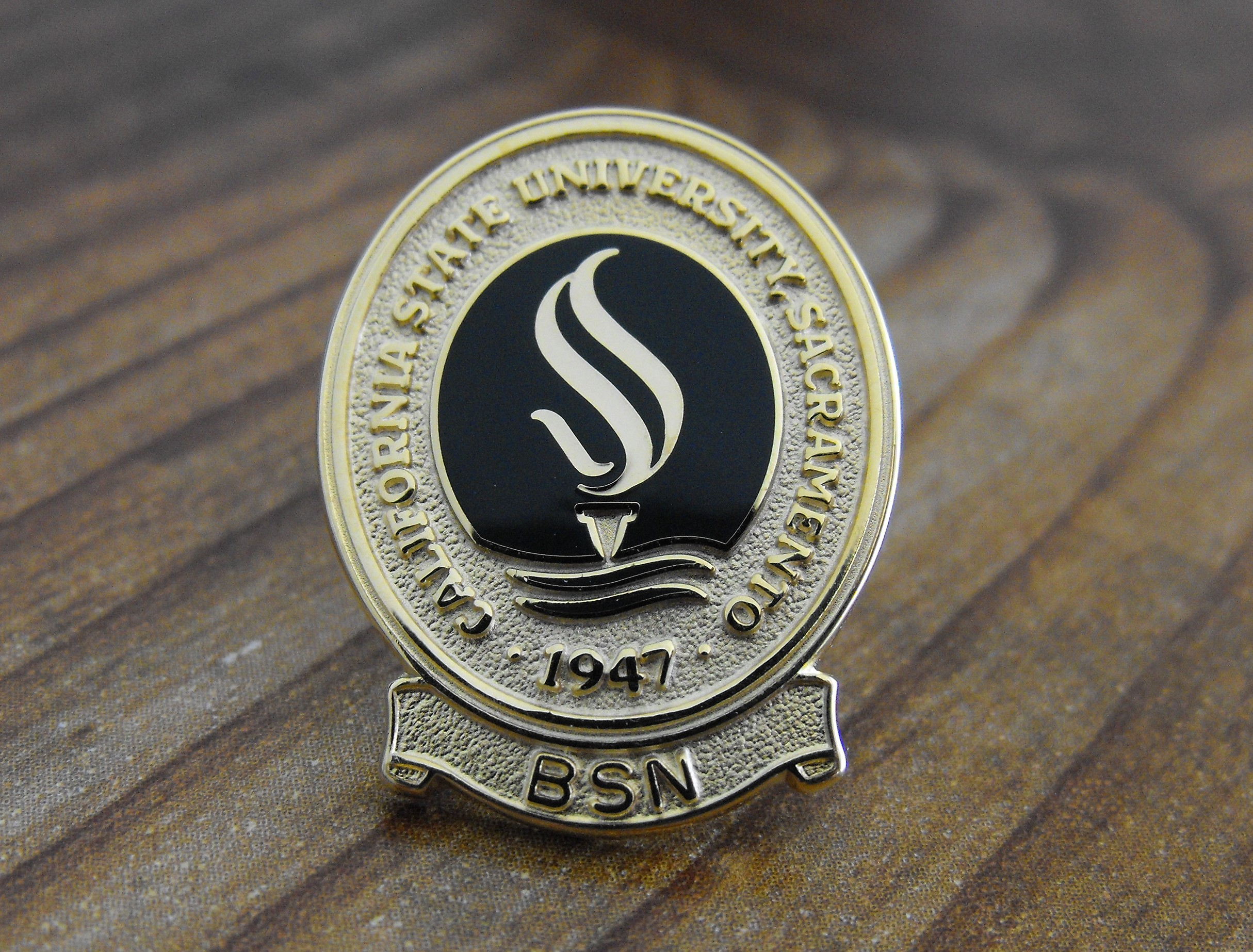
A nursing pin from California State University, Sacramento

A pinning ceremony is a symbolic welcoming of newly graduated or soon-to-be graduated nurses into the nursing profession. It sometimes recognizes the completion of educational requirements that enable nurses to take their state licensing examinations. The ceremony is not a graduation, as it does not signify the completion of all criteria necessary to earn a nursing degree. At some nursing schools, the pinning ceremony is held a few weeks before commencement.

According to Linda Ketchum, a pinning ceremony is "recognition from the nursing faculty and acknowledgment on the part of the student, that in the students' hearts, they are ready for the role of a nurse." Lenora Bodway called pinning ceremonies symbolic of "initiation into the brotherhood and sisterhood of nurses" and remarked that they are "often more personally meaningful than the graduation ceremony".

Historically, a nursing pin symbolizes an educated nurse who is prepared to serve society as a healthcare professional. Typically, each nursing school designs and awards its own unique pin. For example, Bellevue Hospital's 1880 pin design includes a crane that represents vigilance, a blue band symbolizing constancy, and a red band symbolizing mercy and alleviation of suffering.

== See also ==
- Capping ceremony
