= Nurse uniform =

Traditional professional nursing uniform

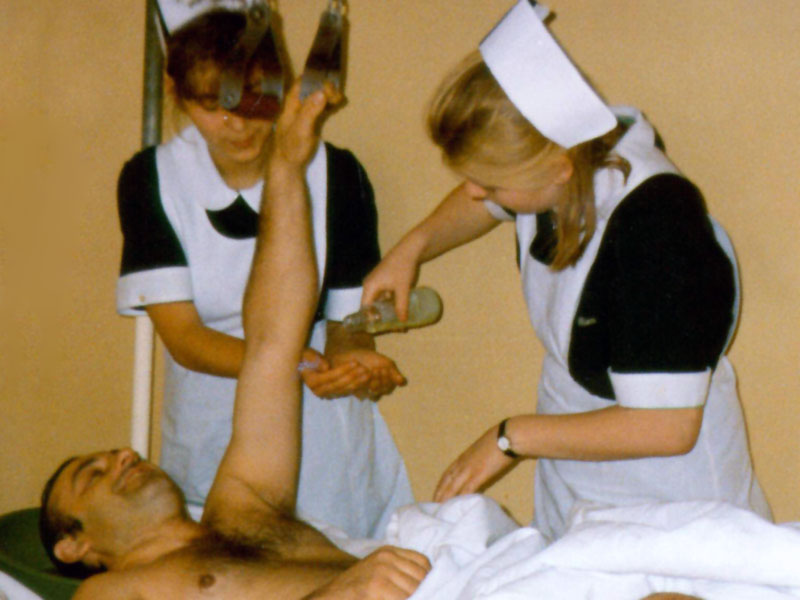
Nurses wearing a traditional uniform consisting of a dress, apron and cap.

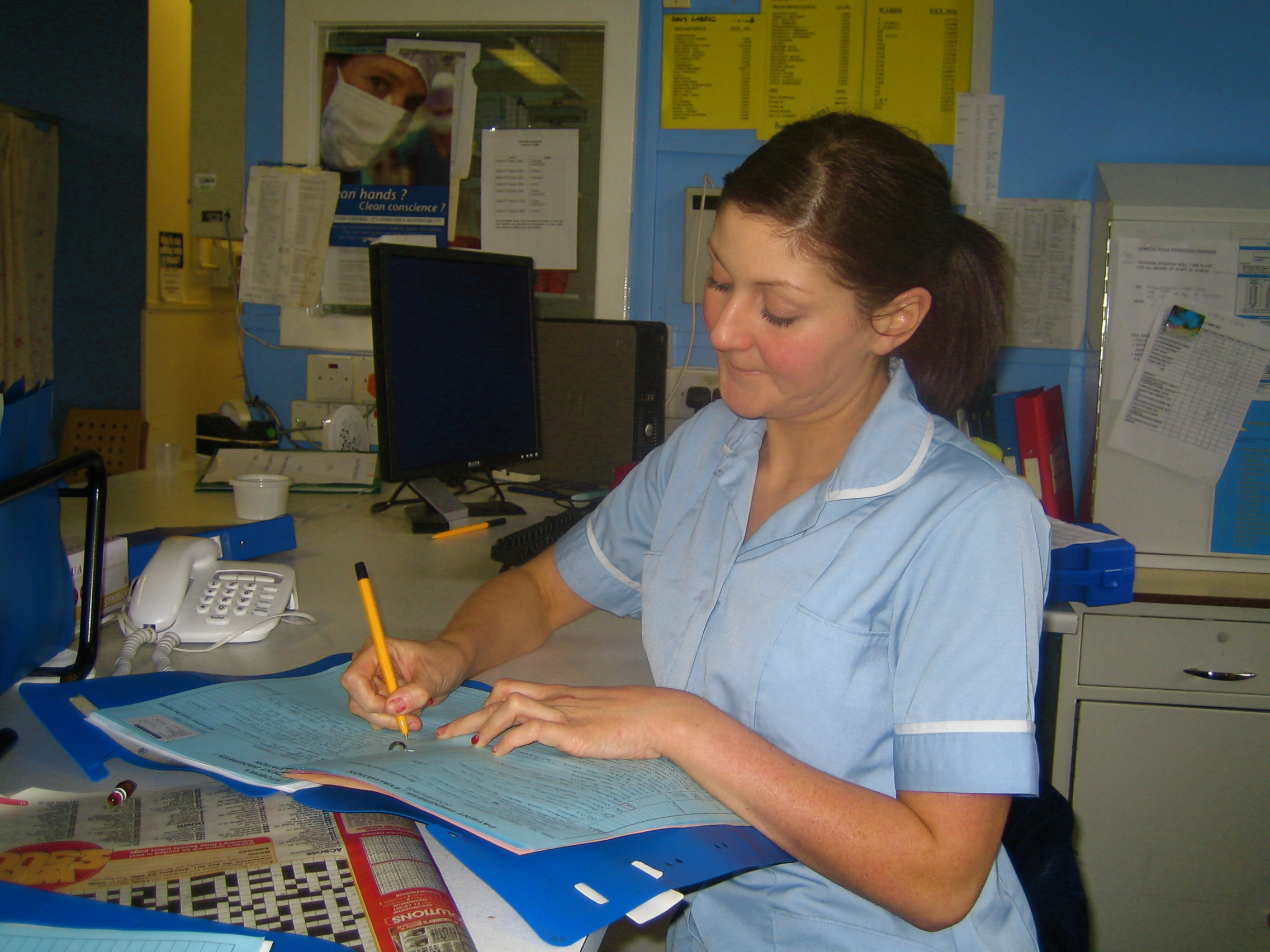
A British staff nurse in a type of uniform dress that has been common since the 1980s.

A nurse uniform is attire worn by nurses for hygiene and identification. The traditional nurse uniform consists of a dress, apron and cap. It has existed in many variants, but the basic style has remained recognizable.

== History ==
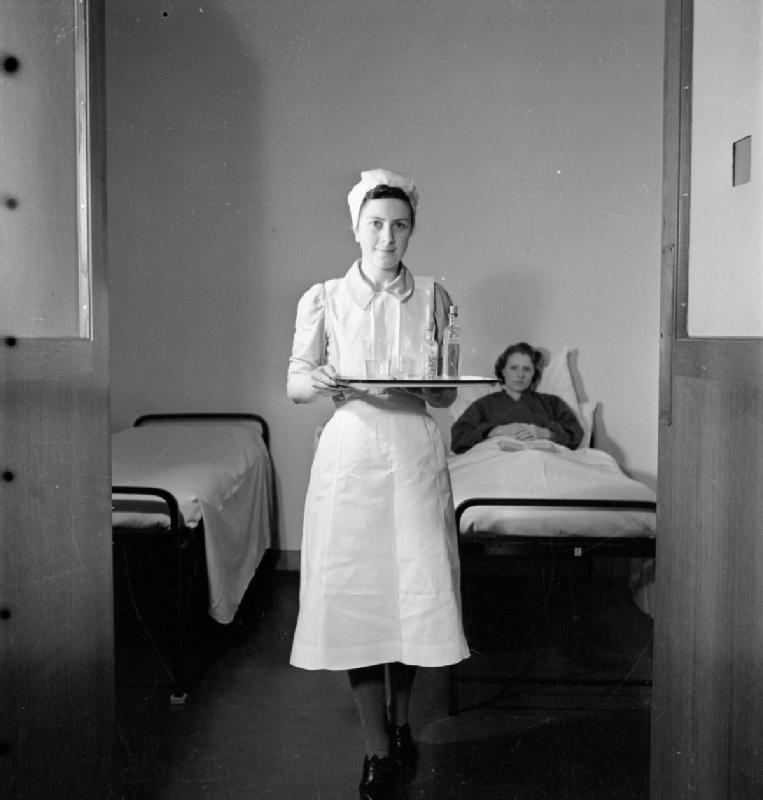
This nurse's uniform consists of a "spotless apron and a practical but attractive mob cap, made simply from a plain triangle of linen". 1943.

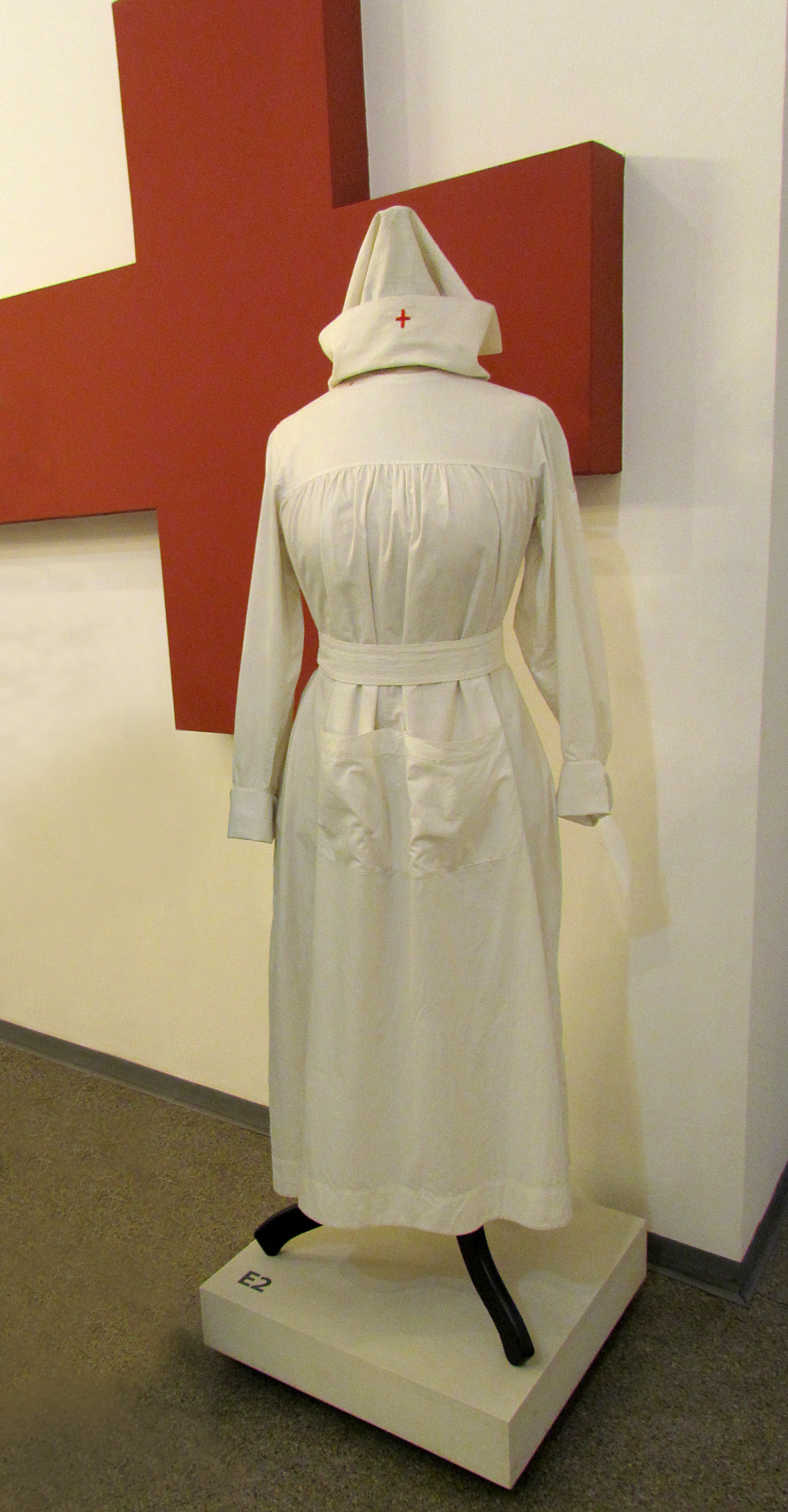
A nurse uniform in Serbia during World War I

The first nurse uniforms were derived from the nun's habit. Before the 19th century, nuns took care of sick and injured people so it was obvious that trained lay nurses might copy the nun's habit as they have adopted ranks like "Sister". One of Florence Nightingale's first students (Miss van Rensselaer) designed the original uniform for the students at Miss Nightingale's school of nursing. Before the 1940s minor changes occurred in the uniform. The clothing consisted of a mainly blue outfit. Hospitals were free to determine the style of the nurse uniform, including the nurse's cap which exists in many variants.

In Britain, the national uniform (or simply "national") was designed with the advent of the National Health Service (NHS) in 1948, and the Newcastle dress. From the 1960s open necks began to appear. In the 1970s, white disposable paper caps replaced cotton ones; in the 1980s, plastic aprons displaced the traditional ones and outerwear began to disappear. From the 1990s, scrubs became popular in Britain, having first appeared in the USA; however, some nurses in Britain continue to wear dresses, although some NHS trusts have removed them in favour of scrubs as in many other countries.

== Standard nurse's uniform ==
Historically, a typical nurse uniform consisted of a dress, pinafore apron and nurse's cap. In some hospitals, however, student nurses also wore a nursing pin, or the pinafore apron may have been replaced by a cobbler style apron. This type of nurse's dress continues to be worn in many countries.

Traditional uniforms remain common in many countries, but in Western Europe and North America, the so-called "scrubs" or tunics have become more popular. "Scrub dress" is a simpler type of uniform, and is almost always worn in operating rooms and emergency rooms.

Nurses have a variety of roles in the 21st century and therefore have a variety of "uniforms". Nurse scientists may wear a lab coat, while nurse executives may wear a suit. The "uniform" will vary by country and role.

== Alternative nurse uniforms ==
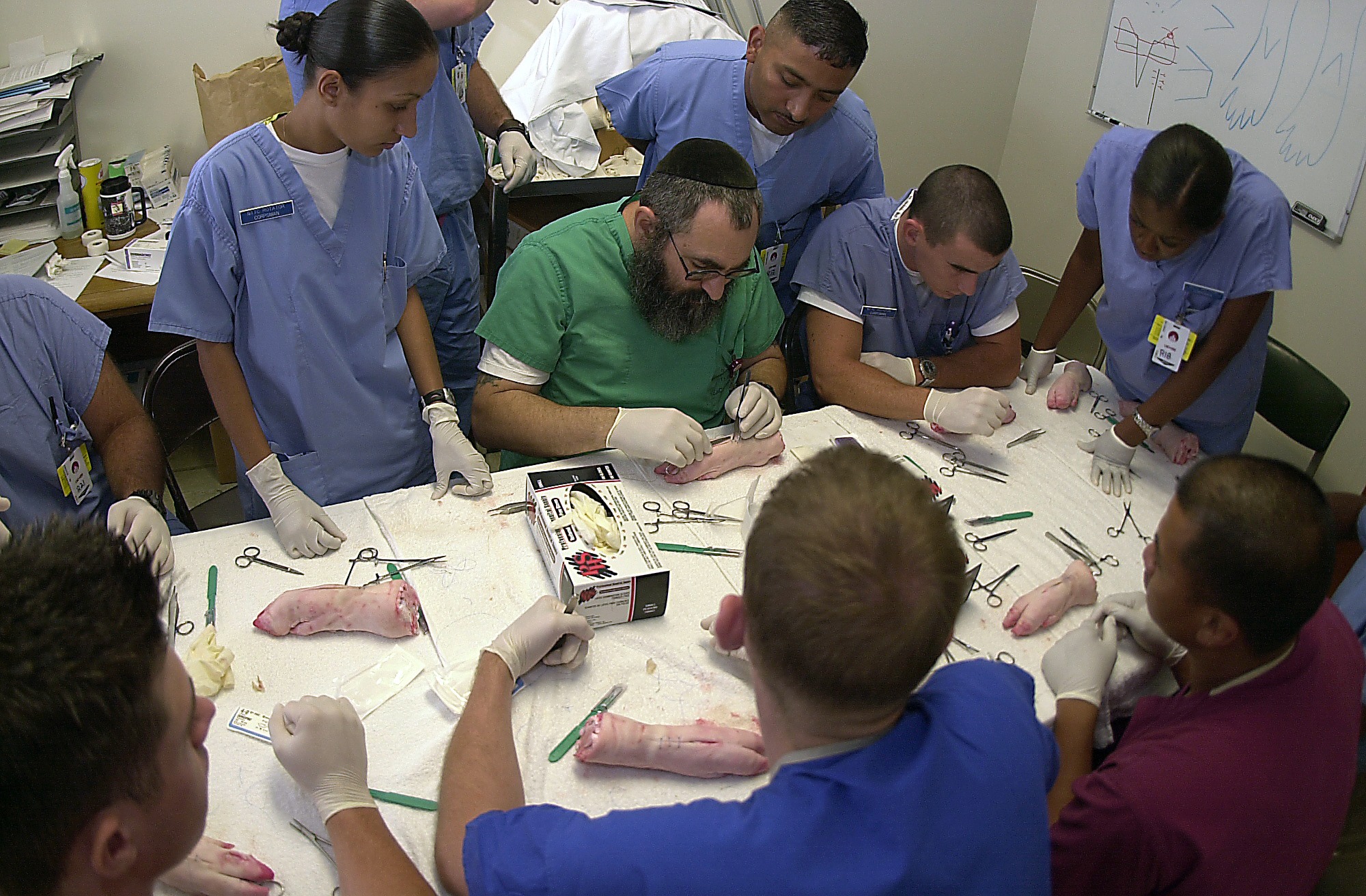
A group of medical students wearing scrubs practice surgical techniques on pigs' feet.

Since the late 1980s, there has been a move towards alternative designs of nursing uniforms in some countries. Newer style nurse's uniform in the United Kingdom consists of either:

1. A tunic-style top and dark blue trousers that are optimally designed to prevent cross-infection, the colour of which depends upon the grade (or, more recently, band) and gender of the nurse – the colour varies between NHS Trusts. The tunics often feature piping around the edges of the uniform.
2. A dress in the same colour as the tunic-style top.

=== Male nursing uniform ===
In some countries the nurse's uniform is now gender neutral. When this is not the case, male nurses wear a different uniform to their female counterparts. In the UK, male nurses often wear a white tunic with epaulettes in a color or quantity that represents their year of training or grade. However, in many trusts the white uniform is now obsolete and uniforms are non-gender specific.

=== No uniform ===
In some settings, for example in psychiatric inpatient units in the UK, it is common for mental health and learning disorder nurses to not wear a formal uniform.

== Nurse uniforms versus scrubs ==
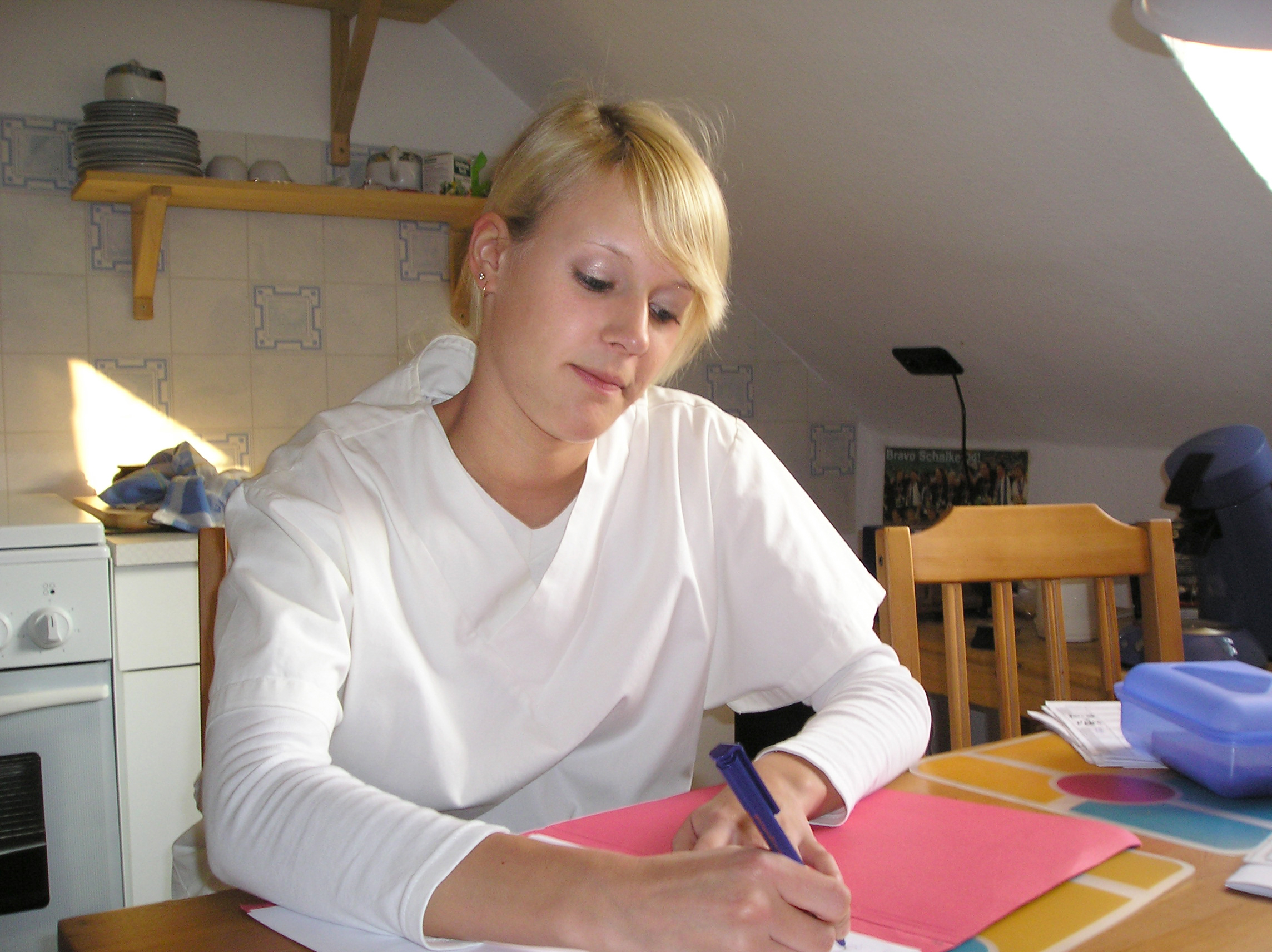
A German nurse in scrubs.

Beginning in the 1990s, and until the present time, the traditional nurse uniforms have been replaced with the "new" scrub dress in some countries. Most hospitals in the US and Europe argue that the scrub uniform is easier to clean than the old nurse uniforms. The nurses who wear the uniforms are divided into two camps:

- Those who prefer the new scrubs; disliked the old white nurse dress uniforms.
- The nurses who liked the old white nurse dress uniforms; they argue that nurses who wear scrubs are seen by the patients as cleaners or surgeons and cannot be identified as nurses.

In many parts of the world, nurses continue to wear a uniform consisting of a dress, pinafore and cap. The traditional white uniform for male nursing staff is now going out of fashion, except for student nurses. A tunic of either the dental surgeon style or a V-neck with a collar is very often used. The colours vary with grade, area of work, and hospital; however, the male equivalent of a sister (that is, charge nurse) tend to be shades of blue or dark green: often, this is the only colour to be recognised by the public as signifying a person in authority.

=== Nursing jewellery ===
Nurses' watch

Nurses were actively discouraged from wearing jewellery which might distract from their purpose and get caught on patient skin during care activity. A fob watch or pendant watch is considered synonymous with nursing. The fob watch frees the nurses' hands for client care and prevents the wrist watch becoming a vector for disease. Watches are sometimes given as a token rite-of-passage gift from parents to young nurses, who are making the transition into nurses' quarters and living away from home for the first time.

== See also ==
- Hospital volunteer – Volunteers in hospitals who work without pay
- Scrubs (clothing) – Lightweight, washable clothing worn by hospital staff or other medical personnel
- Uniform – Similar clothing worn by a group of people
