= Grammer =

Grammer may refer to:

- Grammer (surname), people with the surname
- Grammer, Indiana, a small town in the United States
- A common misspelling of grammar

== See also ==
- Grammar (disambiguation)
