= Grammar (disambiguation) =

Grammar is the system of rules and principles for speaking or writing a natural language, particularly a linguistic description of the morphology and syntax of the language.

Grammar may also refer to:

- Grammar book, a book describing the grammar of one or more languages
- Formal grammar, in mathematics, logic, and theoretical computer science a set of production rules for character strings in a constructed formal language (e.g., a programming language)
- Prescriptive grammar, a style guide laying down norms and guidelines for writing and speaking a natural language

== See also ==
- Grammar school
- Grammer (disambiguation)
