= Edna Nell Doig =

Australian army matron-in-chief (1915–1988)

Edna Doig
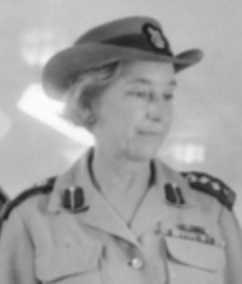
- Doig in 1969
- Born: 21 June 1915; West End, Queensland
- Died: 24 November 1988 (aged 73); Manly, Queensland
- Military career
- Allegiance: Australia
- Branch: Australian Army
- Service years: 1939–1949; 1951–1970
- Rank: Matron-in-Chief
- Commands: Royal Australian Army Nursing Corps (1961–70)
- Conflicts: Second World War; Occupation of Japan
- Awards: Royal Red Cross; Florence Nightingale Medal

Edna Nell Doig, RRC (21 June 1915 – 24 November 1988) was an Australian army matron-in-chief.

== Early life ==
Doig was born on 21 June 1915 at West End, Queensland. She won a scholarship for her high school education at All Hallows' School and completed the Junior Public examination with first class passes in four of her five subjects. She completed her nursing training at Brisbane General Hospital in 1937.

== Career ==
In December 1939 Doig joined the Australian Army Nursing Service as a staff nurse. She served in the 2/3rd Australian General Hospital (AGH) at Godalming, Surrey, before being transferred to the 2/2nd AGH in Egypt, where she was promoted to sister. In March 1942 she returned to Australia where she was appointed lieutenant, then captain, both in 1943.

From September to November 1945 Doig was part of the 2/14th AGH that cared for the Australian prisoners of war released from camps in Malaya prior to their repatriation. Doig spent 1946 to 1949 as deputy-matron of the 130th AGH in Japan. Returning to Australia, she transferred to the Army Reserve in April 1949 and settled in Melbourne. There she undertook midwifery training at the Women's Hospital and worked at the Repatriation General Hospital, Heidelberg.

In 1953 Doig was promoted to major in the Royal Australian Army Nursing Corps. She became matron-in-chief and director of the Army Nursing Service on 23 May 1961, succeeding Ethel Jessie Bowe who had just died. She was then promoted to lieutenant colonel in 1963. Doig toured South Vietnam in 1969.

Doig retired as Colonel on 21 June 1970.

== Awards and honours ==
In the 1953 Queen's Birthday Honours, Doig was made an Associate of the Royal Red Cross (ARRC). She was decorated with the award by Queen Elizabeth II at Government House, Sydney on 6 February 1954.

Doig received the Royal Red Cross (1st Class) (Imperial) in the 1963 New Year Honours for her service in the Royal Australian Army Nursing Corps.

She was awarded the Florence Nightingale Medal in 1969 as one of the 22nd Awards. She received the medal from Lady Hasluck, in her role of President of the National Red Cross, in Melbourne.

== Death and legacy ==
Edna Nell Doig died on 24 November 1988 at Manly, Queensland and was cremated.
