= Grace Wilson =

Australian nurse (1879–1957)

Grace Margaret Wilson
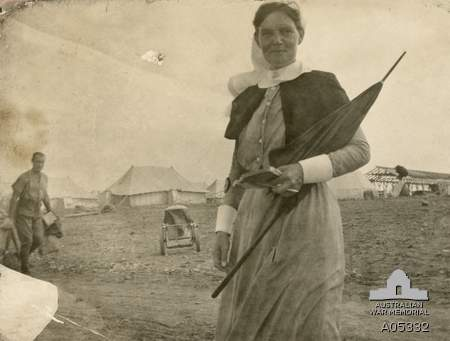
- Grace Wilson on Lemnos island during the Gallipoli Campaign
- Born: 25 June 1879; South Brisbane, Queensland
- Died: 12 January 1957 (aged 77); Repatriation General Hospital, Heidelberg, Victoria
- Military career
- Branch: Australian Army
- Service years: 1914–1941
- Commands: Australian Army Nursing Service (1925–1940)
- Conflicts: World War I World War II
- Awards: Commander of the Order of the British Empire; Royal Red Cross; Mentioned in Despatches (4); Florence Nightingale Medal

Grace Margaret Wilson CBE, RRC (25 June 1879 – 12 January 1957) was a high-ranked nurse in the Australian Army during World War I and the first years of World War II. Wilson was born in Brisbane, and completed her initial training as a nurse in 1908. After the outbreak of World War I she joined the Australian Army Nursing Service (AANS) and subsequently transferred to the First Australian Imperial Force. From 1915 until 1919 she was the principal matron of the 3rd Australian General Hospital. She served as the temporary matron-in-chief in the AIF Headquarters, London from late 1917 until early 1918. Wilson returned to Australia in 1920 and left the AIF to work in civilian hospitals. She was appointed the matron-in-chief of the AANS in 1925, and in September 1940 joined the Second Australian Imperial Force. She served in the Middle East until August 1941, when she returned to Australia due to ill health. She left the Army the next month, but from September 1943 worked in the Department of Manpower Directorate (Victoria)'s nursing control section.

== Early life and World War I ==
Grace Wilson was born in South Brisbane on 25 June 1879. She attended Brisbane Girls Grammar School, and began her training to become a nurse at Brisbane Hospital in 1905. She completed this qualification in 1908. During her period at Brisbane Hospital, Wilson became the first winner of the prestigious gold medal for nursing excellence. She later travelled to London for training in midwifery at the Queen Charlotte's Lying-in Hospital. Wilson subsequently worked at the National Hospital for the Paralysed and Epileptic in London. She arrived back in Australia during July 1914, and became the matron of Brisbane Hospital.

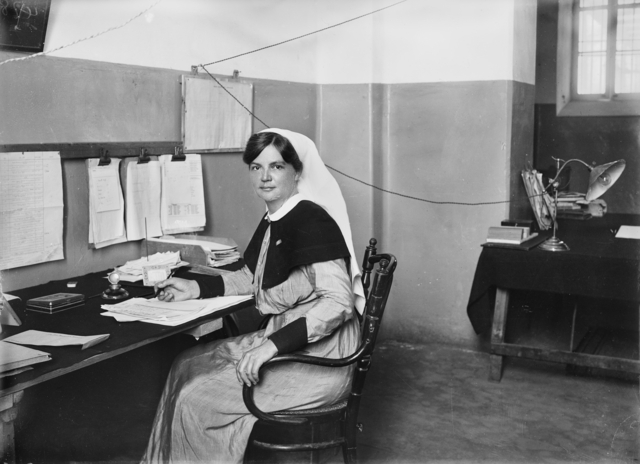
Wilson in her office at a hospital at Abbassia in Egypt during May 1916

Following the outbreak of World War I, Wilson joined the Army Nursing Service Reserve in October 1914 and became the principal matron of the 1st Military District. She enlisted in the Australian Imperial Force (AIF) on 15 April 1915 and was appointed the 3rd Australian General Hospital's (3rd AGH) principal matron. She and the rest of the 3rd AGH departed Sydney bound for Europe on 15 May 1915.

The 3rd AGH arrived in England at the end of June and was originally intended to be deployed to France. Instead, it was decided to send the hospital to Lemnos island in the Mediterranean to treat casualties of the Gallipoli Campaign. The 3rd AGH departed England in early July and arrived at Lemnos on 8 August. The ship carrying the nurses stopped at Alexandria during this voyage, where Wilson learned that one of her brothers had been killed at Quinn's Post in Gallipoli. Conditions at Lemnos were difficult, and there were initially few facilities to care for the many soldiers who were being evacuated there from Gallipoli. Wilson led efforts to improve the situation, earning praise from both her subordinates and superior officers.

In January 1916 the 3rd AGH moved to Abbassia in Egypt. Wilson was mentioned in despatches on three occasions during the year, and was awarded the Royal Red Cross in May. Wilson was also offered the post of Matron in Chief at AIF Headquarters in either late 1915 or early 1916, but turned it down as she wished to remain with the 3rd AGH. In October 1916 the 3rd AGH was transferred to Brighton in England, and remained there until April 1917 when it moved to Abbeville in France.

Wilson was temporarily appointed the Matron in Chief at the AIF Headquarters, London in September 1917 while Evelyn Conyers was on leave in Australia. She remained in this position until April the next year, and then rejoined the 3rd AGH. Following the war, Wilson was mentioned in despatches again in December 1918, and was appointed to the Commander of the Order of the British Empire (CBE) on 1 January 1919. The 3rd AGH was disbanded in May 1919, and Wilson was posted to England to serve in the 3rd Australian Auxiliary Hospital. She returned to Australia in January 1920 and formally ceased to be a member of the AIF in April of that year.

== Interbellum and World War II ==
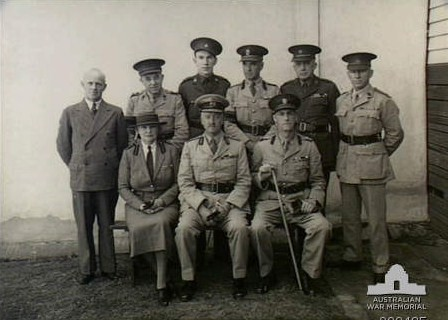
Wilson with other senior Australian Army medical staff in December 1939. Major General Downes is seated to Wilson's left.

From November 1920 to 1922 Wilson was the matron of the Children's Hospital in Melbourne. During this appointment she sought to improve her nurses working conditions, and secured a minimum wage for trainees. In 1922 she resigned from the Children's Hospital and opened her own hospital in East Melbourne. She was appointed the matron-in-chief of the AANS (which was a part-time reserve position) in 1925, and received the Florence Nightingale Medal four years later. Wilson became the matron of The Alfred Hospital in January 1933. In this role she oversaw the first Commonwealth scheme for training nurse tutors. Wilson travelled again to London in 1937 to lead the AANS contingent at the ceremonies which marked the coronation of King George VI and Queen Elizabeth.

Upon the outbreak of World War II in September 1939, Wilson was called up to a full-time position in the Army and resigned from her position at The Alfred Hospital. She served on the staff of the Director-General of Medical Services, Major General Rupert Downes, in Army Headquarters as the Army's matron-in-chief. She became a member of the Second AIF in September 1940, and served in the Middle East as the matron-in-chief of its nursing service. Wilson remained in this position until May 1941, when she was forced to return to Australia due to health problems. She arrived back in Australia in August and left the AIF the next month. Annie Sage replaced her as the AIF's matron-in-chief.

Wilson was subsequently attached to the Australian Red Cross Society and oversaw an expansion of its activities. She was appointed the executive officer of the Department of Manpower Directorate (Victoria)'s nursing control section on 15 September 1943. In this role she controlled the staffing of all hospitals in the state of Victoria, and had a personal staff of four trained nurses and eleven office workers.

== Retirement ==
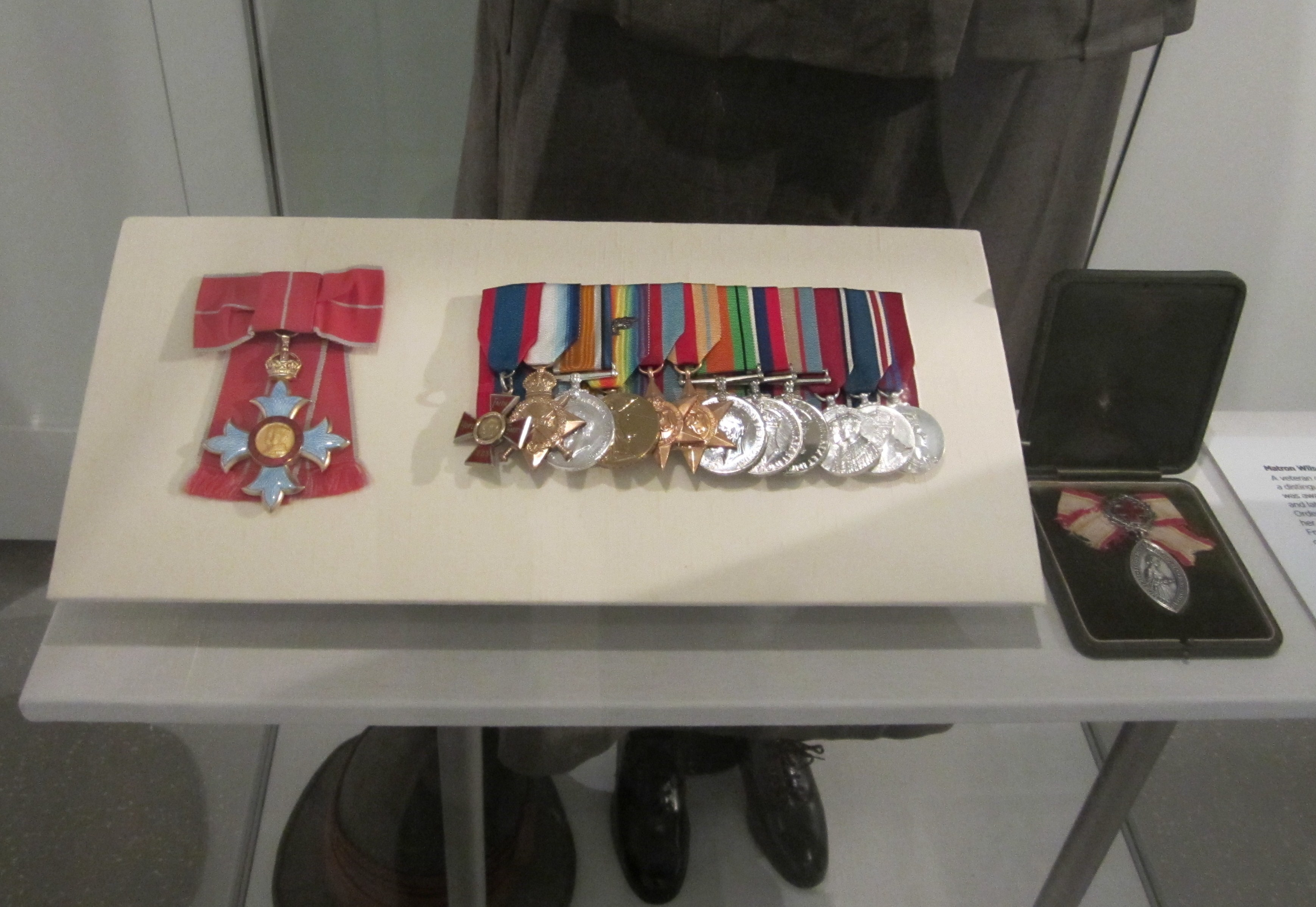
Grace Wilson's medals on display at the Australian War Memorial, Canberra

Wilson retired following the end of World War II, but continued to work on a voluntary basis for a number of organisations. These included the Royal Victorian Trained Nurses' Association, Royal Victorian College of Nursing, Australian Red Cross Society and the Girl Guides' Association. In addition, she worked as a trustee for the Shrine of Remembrance and the Edith Cavell Trust Fund. In 1953, Wilson became the first female life member of the Returned and Services League of Australia. Several nursing organisations also awarded her their highest honours. She married Robert Wallace Bruce Campbell in London on 12 January 1954. Wilson died at the Repatriation General Hospital at Heidelberg, Victoria on 12 January 1957. She was accorded a funeral with full military honours at Christ Church in South Yarra.

Wilson's medals and uniform from World War I were placed on permanent display at the Australian War Memorial in 2014. Her World War I service was depicted in the 2014 television miniseries ANZAC Girls, in which actress Caroline Craig was cast as Wilson. In 2019, Grace Wilson along with Vivian Bullwinkel, were memorialised in mosaic banners installed at the Repatriation General Hospital at Heidelberg, Victoria.
