= Ethel Jessie Bowe =

Former Australian army matron-in-chief (1906–1961)

Colonel Ethel Bowe
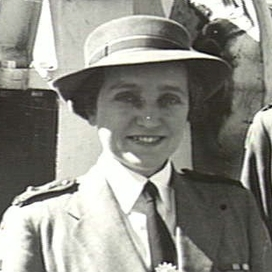
- Born: 27 May 1906; Maldon, Victoria
- Died: 13 October 1961 (aged 55); Heidelberg, Victoria
- Military career
- Allegiance: Australia
- Branch: Australian Army
- Service years: 1931–1948; 1951–1961
- Rank: Colonel
- Nickname: "Bowie"
- Commands: Royal Australian Army Nursing Corps (1952–61)
- Conflicts: Second World War
- Awards: Officer of the Order of the British Empire; Royal Red Cross; Florence Nightingale Medal; Bronze Star Medal (United States)

Ethel Jessie Bowe, OBE, RRC (27 May 1906 – 13 October 1961) was an Australian military nurse during the Second World War and later matron-in-chief of the Royal Australian Army Nursing Corps. She was awarded an Associate Royal Red Cross in 1944, a Florence Nightingale Medal in 1953, a Royal Red Cross in 1955 and appointed an Officer of the Order of the British Empire in 1960. She became an honorary colonel and an honorary nursing sister to Queen Elizabeth II.

== Life ==
Bowe was born on 27 May 1906 in Maldon, Victoria. Her parents were Edith Jane (née Dorman) and her husband Abraham James Bowe, who was a bricklayer. Her parents were both born in Victoria and they brought up their eleven children in a cottage built by her grandfather. She qualified as a nurse in 1930 and as a midwife in 1931, when she joined the Australian Army Nursing Service Reserve.

Major Ethel Jessie Bowe became a sister with the Australian Army Nursing Service on 19 December 1939 and she was called up in the following March to the Second Australian Imperial Force and in May she embarked overseas with 32 nurses. They thought that they were going to the Middle East but en route they were redirected to England during the Battle for Britain. The nurses worked in a hospital in Godalming in Surrey before they went to Kantara in Egypt. In 1941 Bowe was appointed matron of the 2/2nd Australian General Hospital, initially temporarily.

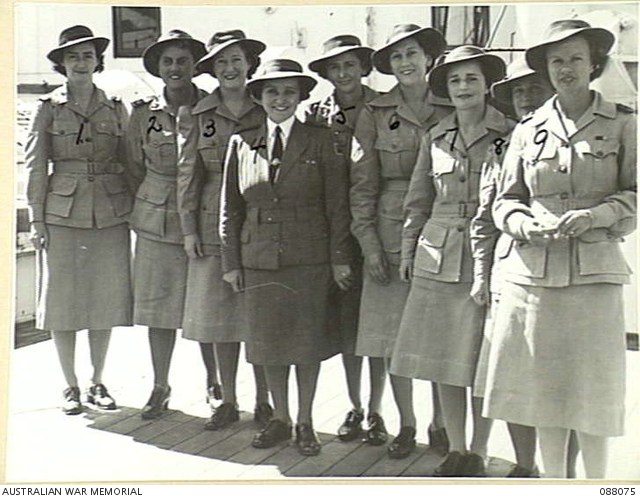
Lieutenant Colonel Ethel Bowe and lieutenants in Sydney at the No. 110 Casualty Clearing Station on board the Manunda on 4 April 1945

In 1944 Bowe was awarded the Associate Royal Red Cross (ARRC). In 1947 German and Italian prisoners of war and internees were still being returned to their home countries and Bowe was involved with their departure in November. She was soon discharged from military service in the following year. She worked in Austria and she rejoined the Australian military in 1951. She became an honorary Colonel in 1952 and, in time, an honorary nursing sister to Queen Elizabeth II.

In 1953 the Florence Nightingale Medal was given by the International Committee of the Red Cross to three Australian matrons, Melbourne's Edith Johnson, Brisbane's Sarah Charlotte MacDonald and Bowe. In 1960 she was appointed an Officer of the Order of the British Empire (OBE) in recognition of her work.

== Death and legacy ==
Bowe died in the Repatriation General Hospital in Melbourne in 1961. She was succeeded by Edna Nell Doig as matron-in-chief and director of the army nursing service. Doig also became an honorary colonel and the Queen's honorary nursing sister. Bowe's wartime diaries from 1940 to 1944 are held in the Australian War Memorial in Canberra.
