= Joyce Hood =

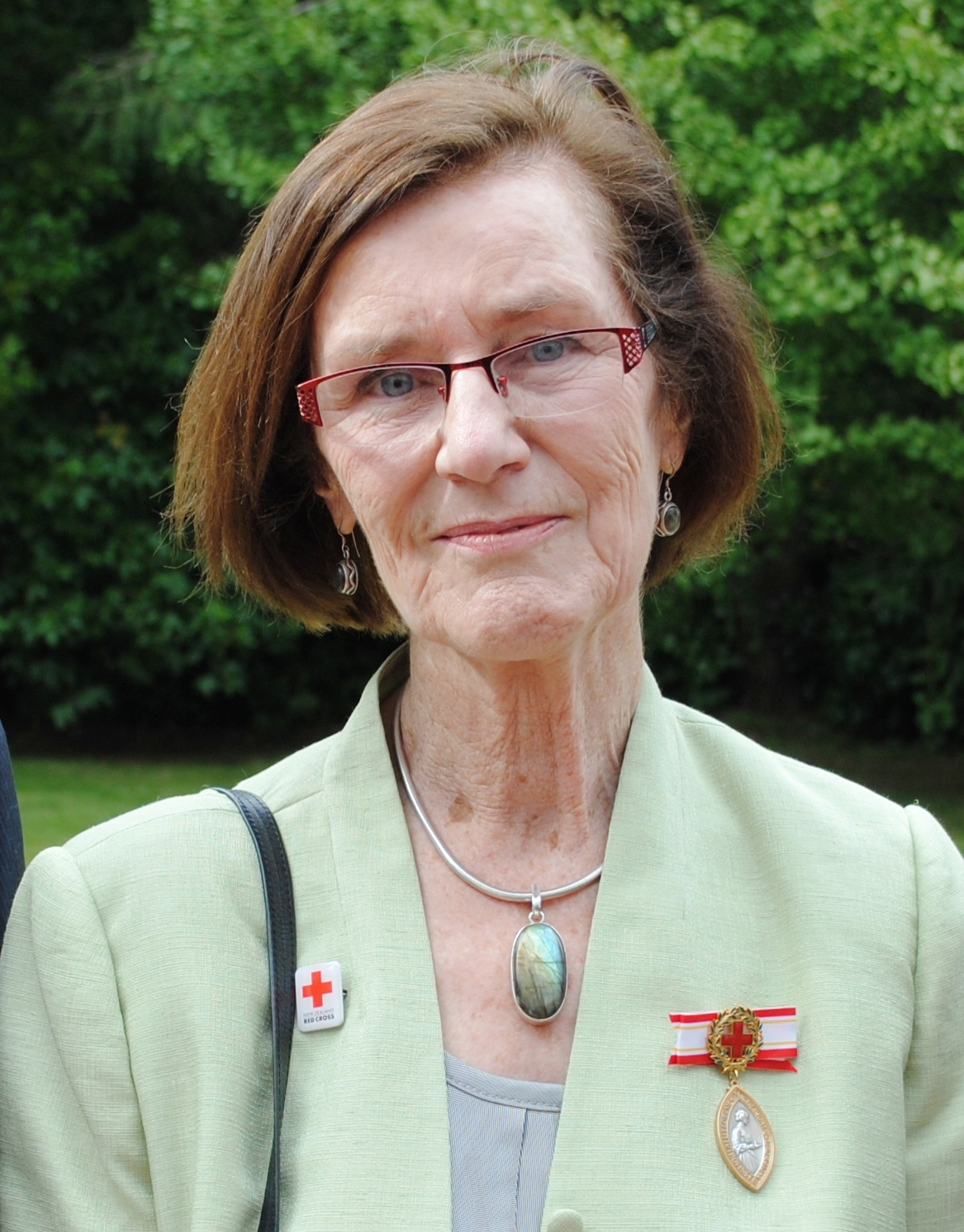
Hood in 2010, after being presented with the Florence Nightingale Medal

Joyce Hood is a New Zealand nurse. In her work with the International Red Cross and Red Crescent Movement she has served in areas of armed conflict and natural disaster, and received a number of medals recognising her service.

== Biography ==
Hood is from Britain and completed her nursing training there in around 1961. She emigrated to New Zealand in 1965, settling in Auckland. In 1998 she became an aid worker for the International Red Cross. Her first assignment was to Kandahar, Afghanistan, in 1999. She has also served in Kenya, Timor Leste, Libya, Iraq and South Ossetia. As part of some of her assignments Hood has been responsible for training local medical personnel to update their skills.

=== Recognition ===
In 2009 Hood was awarded the Florence Nightingale Medal. She has also received the New Zealand Operational Service Medal and the New Zealand General Service Medal.
