= Manunda =

Australian ship

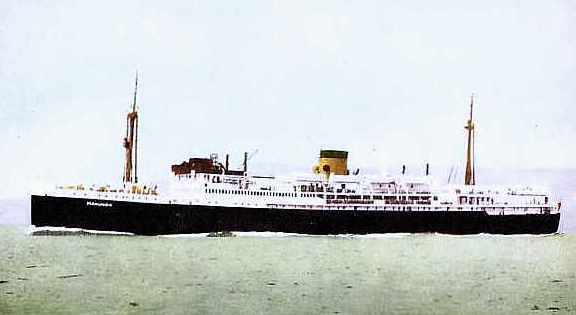
- Postcard of TSMV Manunda in Adelaide Steamship Co. livery (buff funnel with black band at top), c.1930

History

Australia
- Name: TSMV Manunda
- Owner: Adelaide Steamship Company, Melbourne
- Builder: William Beardmore and Company, Dalmuir
- Yard number: 651
- Launched: 27 November 1928
- Completed: 16 April 1929
- Acquired: 23 May 1929
- In service: June 1929
- Out of service: September 1939
- In service: April 1948
- Out of service: September 1956
- Reclassified: Hospital ship, 25 May 1940
- Identification: Official number: 153933
- Fate: Sold, October 1956

Japan
- Name: Hakone Maru
- Owner: Okadagumi Shipping Ltd., Japan
- Acquired: October 1956
- Fate: Broken up at Osaka, June 1957

General characteristics
- Type: Passenger/cargo ship
- Tonnage: 9,115 GRT; 5,300 NRT
- Length: 430 ft (130 m)
- Beam: 60 ft 2 in (18.34 m)
- Depth: 35 ft 7 in (10.85 m)
- Propulsion: Harland & Wolff oil-fired engines, 1,304 nhp
- Speed: 15 knots (28 km/h; 17 mph)
- Capacity: 312 passengers (176 first class / 136 second class)

TSMV Manunda was an Australian registered and crewed passenger ship which was converted to a hospital ship in 1940. During the war Manunda saw service in both the Middle East and Pacific Campaigns, specifically New Guinea. She resumed her passenger duties after the war, before being sold to a Japanese company and finally broken up in 1957.

== Design and construction ==
In 1927 the Adelaide Steamship Company in Australia ordered a new 9,115 GRT liner to provide full-time Australian coastal passenger services, which had previously only been offered by the company on a limited scale.

The Twin Screw Motor Vessel Manunda was built by William Beardmore and Company at Dalmuir in Scotland. The vessel was 136 metres (446 ft) in length, with a beam of 18 metres (59 ft). Diesel motors provided power to the two propeller shafts, with a top speed of 15 knots (28 km/h; 17 mph). Passenger capacity was 176 first class and 136 second class.

The ship was launched on 27 November 1928, and completed on 16 April 1929. It was a company policy for all its motor vessels to have a name starting with "M" and the ship was named after an Aboriginal word meaning "place near water". She was the largest ship operated by the Adelaide Steamship Company at the time, and as a result of her success the company commissioned a larger, faster sister ship, Manoora, which was completed in 1935.

== Operational history ==
=== Early career ===
She arrived in Australia in June 1929 to begin her duties on the Australian coastal trade, running passengers and cargo between Sydney, Fremantle, Melbourne and Cairns.

In late 1929, Manunda rammed Birkenhead Wharf in Adelaide.

=== World War II ===
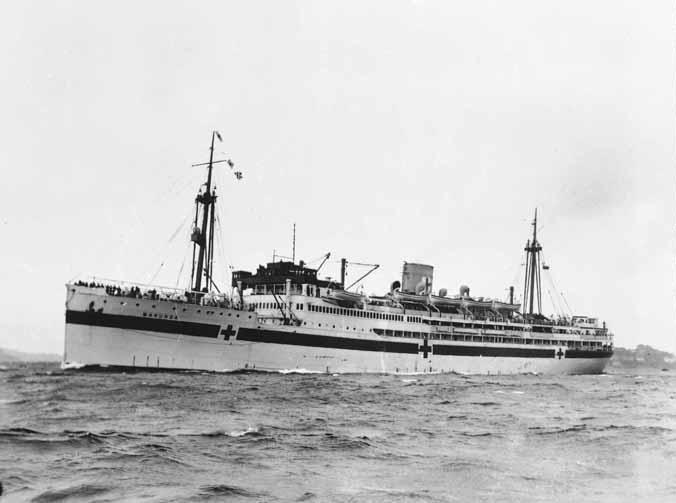
The newly fitted hospital ship Manunda in Sydney Harbour on 17 August 1940

The declaration of war saw Manunda fitted out as DEMS ship (Defensively Equipped Merchant Ship), under the control of the Australian Shipping Control Board. During the process of converting it into a hospital ship, the No. 1 Hold was deemed to be dangerous and never rectified. One death was recorded (that of Second Officer Rupert Mafeking Blunt) and several officers were injured due to the complications with the design.

She was converted into a hospital ship at Sydney in compliance with the Geneva Convention Regulations and was taken over by the authorities on 25 May 1940, and entered service as AHS Manunda on 22 July 1940, under Captain James Garden, previously the captain of the Adelaide Steamship Company Manoora and Commodore of the Adelaide Steamship Fleet. The general hospital based on board was commanded by Lt. Col. John Beith, and members of the Australian Army Nursing Service (AANS) on board were led by Matron Clara Jane Shumack (1899–1974).

Manunda sailed on a shakedown cruise to Darwin, Port Moresby and returned to Sydney, before heading for Suez in the Middle East (she made four trips to the Middle East and Mediterranean between November 1940 and September 1941). She was then despatched to Darwin. On the morning of 19 February 1942, Manunda was damaged during the Japanese air raids on Darwin, despite her highly prominent red cross markings on a white background. 12 members of the ship's crew and hospital staff were killed, 19 others were seriously wounded and another 40 or so received minor wounds. Manunda was able to act as a casualty clearing station for injured personnel from other ships involved in the attack. She sailed to Fremantle the next day. Captain James Garden was later awarded the OBE, in 1945, for his bravery and skill, both during the attacks, in leading a fire extinguishing team on the ship and in later navigating it by the stars to Fremantle with no navigation equipment and a jury-rigged steering system. In 1943 Thomas Minto, First Mate on Manunda, was awarded the M.B.E. for gallantry and devotion to duty on the Manunda during air raids at Darwin in February 1942. In June 1945 Matron Clara Shumack was awarded the Royal Red Cross. Her Citation included "...On one occasion when the ship was in Darwin it was badly damaged...It was especially during this period that MATRON SHUMACK displayed very great calmness and exceptional devotion to duty, and her quiet and confident manner was an inspiration to all her fellow workers".

After a refit in Adelaide, she went to Milne Bay in Papua New Guinea, where she acted as a floating hospital for the Allied forces who were stationed there. She spent several nights in Milne Bay, during attacks by Japanese warships, but her status as a hospital ship was, on this occasion honored by Japanese naval units, which raked her with searchlights on three nights running. She made a total of 27 voyages from Milne Bay to Brisbane and Sydney transporting wounded troops.

As the war continued, she was relocated as required and she followed the Allied forces the various islands around the Pacific.

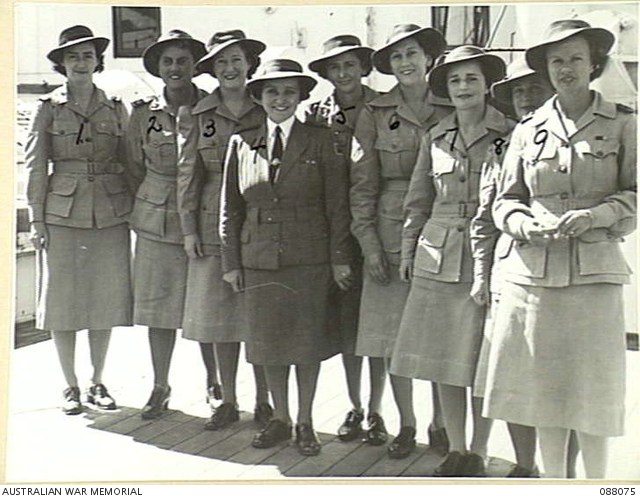
Lt Col Ethel Jessie Bowe and Lieutenants in Sydney of the 110 casualty clearing station on board the Manunda on 4 April 1945

Six days after the sinking of AHS Centaur, a request was made by the Australian Department of Defence that the identification markings and lights be removed from AHS Manunda, weapons be installed, and that she begin to sail blacked out and under escort. The conversion was performed, although efforts by the Department of the Navy, the Admiralty, and authorities in New Zealand and the United States of America caused the completed conversion to be undone. The cost of the roundabout work came to £12,500, and kept Manunda out of service for three months. On 9 June 1943, communications between the Combined Chiefs of Staff on the subject of hospital ships contained a section referring to the Manunda incident as a response to the attack on Centaur, with the conclusion that the attack was the work of an irresponsible Japanese commander, and that it would be better to wait until further attacks had been made before considering the removal of hospital ship markings.

Manunda's final wartime voyage was to New Zealand transporting civilian passengers. During the war she carried approximately 30,000 casualties to safety.

After the Japanese surrender, Manunda was despatched to Singapore to repatriate ex-POWs and civilian internees who had been imprisoned in Changi Prison. She also sailed to Labuan in Borneo to pick up ex-POWs and civilian internees from Batu Lintang camp.

=== Postwar career ===
Manunda was decommissioned in September 1946 and refitted. She returned to service on 2 April 1948, transporting passengers around the Australian coast. In September 1956 she was withdrawn from service and sold to the Japanese Okadagumi Line, who renamed the vessel Hakone Maru.

The company's plans for the ship did not eventuate, and she was broken up the next year in Japan, arriving in Osaka for scrapping on 18 June 1957.

== Legacy ==
In 1973 the suburb of Manunda in Cairns was named after the ship. In 1975 the neighbouring suburb of Manoora was named after its sister ship.
