= Annie Sage =

Military Nurse

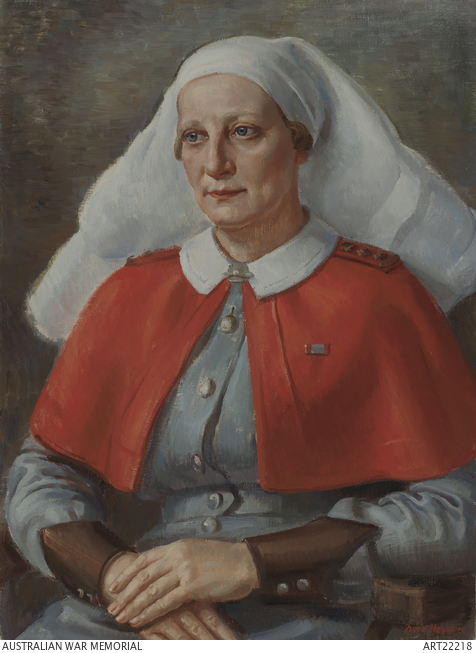
- Matron Annie Sage by Nora Heysen
- Born: 17 August 1895; Somerville, Victoria
- Died: 4 April 1969 (aged 73); Frankston, Victoria
- Military career
- Allegiance: Australia
- Branch: Australian Army
- Service years: 1939–1952
- Rank: Matron-in-Chief (Colonel)
- Nickname: "Sammie"
- Service number: VFX361
- Commands: Australian Army Nursing Service (1943–52)
- Conflicts: Second World War
- Awards: Commander of the Order of the British Empire; Royal Red Cross; Florence Nightingale Medal

Annie Moriah Sage, CBE, RRC (17 August 1895 – 14 April 1969) was an Australian nursing administrator and Matron-In-Chief in the Second Australian Imperial Force during the Second World War. She was a recipient of the Florence Nightingale Medal, honoured as a member of the Royal Red Cross and was appointed a Commander of the Order of the British Empire.

== Early life ==
Sage was born in Somerville, Victoria, on 17 August 1895, and studied midwifery at the Women's Hospital in Carlton. She was registered as a midwife in 1924 and a nurse in 1926.

== Military nursing career ==
From December 1939 to January 1947, Sage served as a member of the Australian Army Nursing Service in the Second Australian Imperial Force (AIF). In February 1940, she was posted as matron to the 2/2nd Australian General Hospital and in April sailed to the Middle East, serving in Gaza Ridge, Palestine and Kantara. In May 1941 Sage was promoted to matron-in-chief of the AIF (Middle East). The following year she was made a member of the Royal Red Cross, for her "gallant and distinguished service".

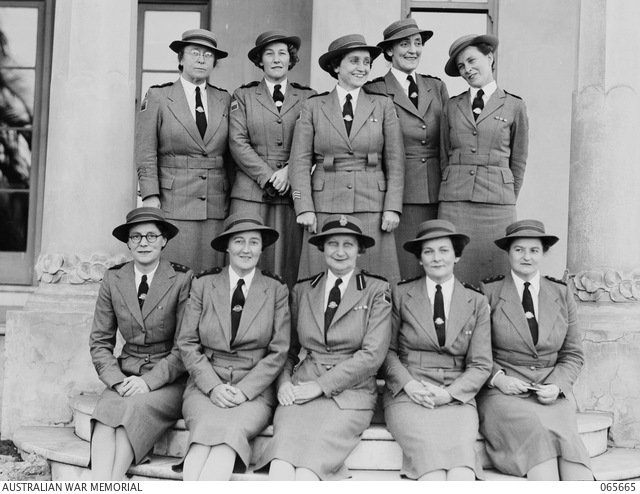
Principal matrons in Melbourne in 1944: Joan Stevenson Abbott is top left, Ethel Jessie Bowe is centre top row and Annie M. Sage is middle bottom row.

Later in 1942, Sage returned to Australia and was promoted to deputy matron-in-chief at Land Headquarters. In 1943 she was promoted again, this time to matron-in-chief, Australian Military Forces, and attained the rank of colonel. During this time she oversaw the development of Australian Army Medical Women's Service Training Scheme.

In 1945 Sage was amongst 100 recipients at an investiture at Government House Canberra, where she was presented with the Royal Red Cross by the Duke of Gloucester. In 1947 she was awarded the Florence Nightingale Medal by the International Red Cross, for her military service.

== Post-war career and retirement ==
After Sage was demobilised from the AIF in 1947, she became Lady Superintendent of the Women's Hospital, Carlton, and continued with her role as matron-in-chief, Citizen Military Forces part time. She was the founding president of the College of Nursing, Melbourne and in 1969 was made an Honorary Fellow.

Sage was appointed a Commander of the Order of the British Empire (Military Division) in 1951 and retired from the military in 1952. Later that year, she stood for pre-selection for the seat of Flinders in the 1952 by-election. While she was widely regarded for her role in the Second World War, it was reported at the time that members of the Liberal party felt that "Flinders cannot be won by a woman candidate". Sage was not selected, and Flinders went on to be contested by John Rossiter who lost to Keith Ewert (Labor).

Sage died in 1969 in Frankston, Victoria, and was given military honours at her funeral in Springvale.

== Legacy ==
In 1969 the College of Nursing, Melbourne, set up the Annie M. Sage Memorial Scholarship. This is now administered by Monash University's School of Nursing and Midwifery, and recipients receive $10,000.
