= Clare Deacon =

Australian nurse

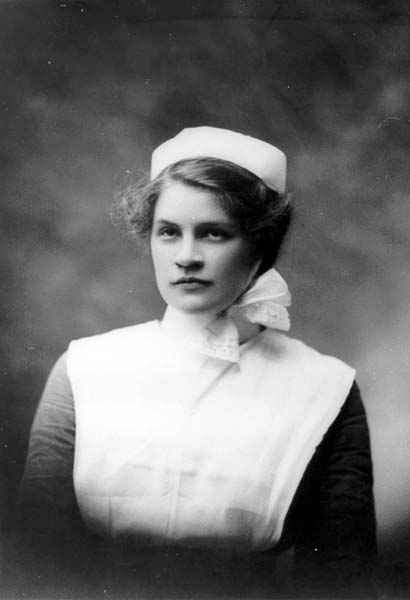
- Clare Deacon circa 1915
- Born: 13 March 1891; Pipers River, Tasmania
- Died: 7 August 1952 (aged 61); Crows Nest, New South Wales
- Occupation: Nurse
- Spouse: James McGregor
- Honours: MM

Sister Clare Deacon MM (13 March 1891—7 August 1952) was an Australian nurse who was among the first women to receive the Military Medal for bravery during the First World War.

== Early life ==
Deacon was born on 13 March 1891 in Pipers River, Tasmania as one of five children to Mrs. and Mr. William Deacon. She and her youngest sister Henrietta were raised by her aunt Mrs. Bird and uncle Mr. Samuel Bird in Burnie, Tasmania.

Deacon trained as a nurse in Hobart and passed the general examination in 1912.

== First World War ==
Deacon was enlisted in the Australian Imperial Force as a nurse with the Australian Army Nursing Service on 29 November 1914. She was among the first group of Australian nurses to leave for service on the Kyarra. Her first military experience was in Egypt where she remained for 12 months, serving at Mena Camp during the Gallipoli campaign. In 1915, Deacon was promoted to Sister and relocated to England where she served in hospitals in Wandsworth, Denmark Hill and Dartford. She then travelled to France in March 1916 and was temporarily stationed at the Australian Casualty Clearing Station near Armentières.

=== Military Medal ===
Deacon was present during a bombing of the 2nd Australian casualty clearing station in Messines on the night of 22 July 1917. It was reported that during the enemy air raid, despite being off-duty at the time, Deacon refused to leave and continued to treat patients. She protected the soldiers in part by evacuating them from the burning buildings and using the enamel hospital bowls to cover their heads.

A few weeks after the air raid, Sister Deacon and three other Australian nurses (Sisters Dorothy Cawood and Alice Ross-King, and nurse M. J. Derrer) received letters informing them that they had been awarded the Military Medal for valour. It was reported that the nurses believed this to be a joke at first because, at that point, no Military Medals had been awarded to women. They realised the awards for "conspicuous bravery at the front" were genuine after receiving official notification and an unofficial presentation from Sir William Birdwood. Deacon received the award from King George V during her leave in England in 1917. She was the first Tasmanian woman to receive the Military Medal, the only Tasmanian nursing sister to have received this medal at the time, and the first Australian Red Cross nurse to be decorated by King George V. The Military Medal was the greatest honour for bravery that could be received by a woman. It was more common for army nurses to receive the Royal Red Cross, as the Military Medal was only awarded to those who displayed bravery under fire.

Deacon returned to Tasmania in 1918 on the TSS Kanowna and received praise and recognition back home for her service. In April 1918, she was guest of honour at the Mayor's Court-room in Hobart Town Hall along with 21 soldiers, where she was presented with a silver brooch.

Along with the Military Medal, Deacon also received the British War Medal, the 1914–15 Star, and the Victory Medal.

== Later life ==
Deacon was discharged from the Australian Imperial Force in Tasmania in March 1919. After the war, she worked in military hospitals in Tasmania until her marriage to James McGregor. She then lived in Queensland and New South Wales for the rest of her life.

Deacon died of meningitis on 7 August 1952 in Crows Nest, New South Wales, a few weeks after visiting her relatives on the North-West coast.

== Legacy ==
Deacon was posthumously inducted into the Tasmanian Honour Roll of Women in September 2006. In March 2021, on the 102nd anniversary of her discharge, a memorial frame of her medals was hung in the Medals Room of the Army Museum of Tasmania along with a biography. Deacon is listed in the Dictionary of Biography of notable Australians.

Deacon Close, in the Canberra suburb of Chisholm, is named in her honour.
