= Women in the Australian military =

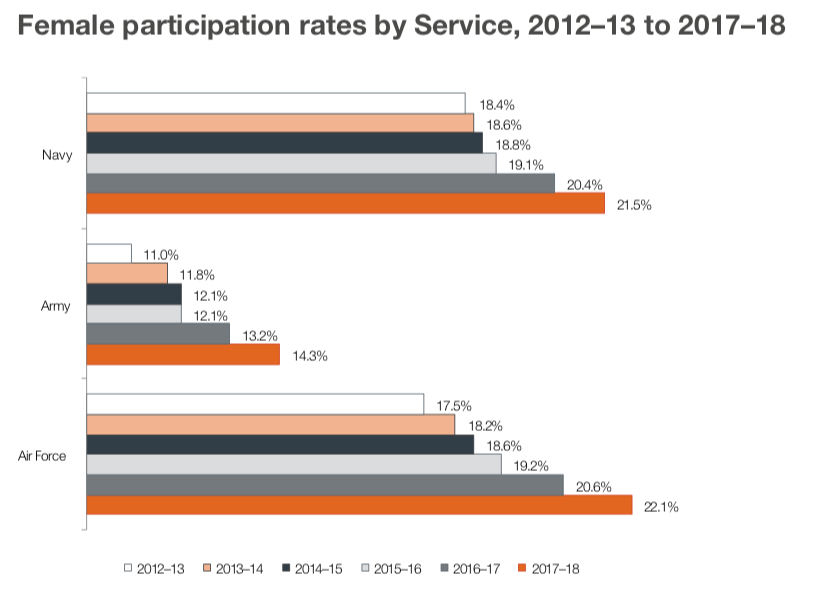
Australian Defence Force Female participation rates by Service, 2012–13 to 2017–18

Women currently make up 19.2% of the ADF workforce. Women have served in Australian armed forces since 1899. Until World War II women were restricted to the Australian Army Nursing Service. This role expanded in 1941–42 when the Royal Australian Navy (RAN), Australian Army and Royal Australian Air Force established female branches in which women took on a range of support roles. While these organisations were disbanded at the end of the war, they were reestablished in 1950 as part of the military's permanent structure. Women were integrated into the services during the late 1970s and early 1980s, but were not allowed to apply for combat roles. In January 2013, serving women were allowed to apply for all positions in the Australian Defence Force (ADF) except special forces which became open to women in January 2014. In January 2016, civilian women became able to direct entry to all positions.

== Current female participation rates ==
The ADF has an overall female participation rate of 19.2%. This has grown steadily since 2011, when Defence made increasing female participation a priority, with the intent of opening all previously gender restricted roles to women. Since 2012-13 defence has produced an annual ‘Women in the ADF’ report to assess their progress, as “increasing the participation of women in the ADF ensures that Defence secures the best possible talent available”.

The percentage of women in each service as of the 2017-18 report is 21.5% in the Navy, 14.3% in the Army, and 22.1% in the Air Force.

== History ==
=== Early involvement ===
Female service in the Australian military began in 1899 when the Australian Army Nursing Service was formed as part of the New South Wales colonial military forces. Army nurses formed part of the Australian contribution to the Boer War, and their success led to the formation of the Australian Army Nursing Reserve in 1902.

=== World War I ===
The role of Australian women in World War I was focused mainly upon their involvement in the provision of nursing services. More than 2000 members of the Australian Army Nursing Service (AANS) served overseas during World War I as part of the Australian Imperial Force. At the end of the war the AANS returned to its pre-war reserve status. In addition to the military nurses, a small group of civilian nurses dubbed the "Bluebirds" were recruited by the Australian Red Cross Society and served in French hospitals.

=== World War II ===
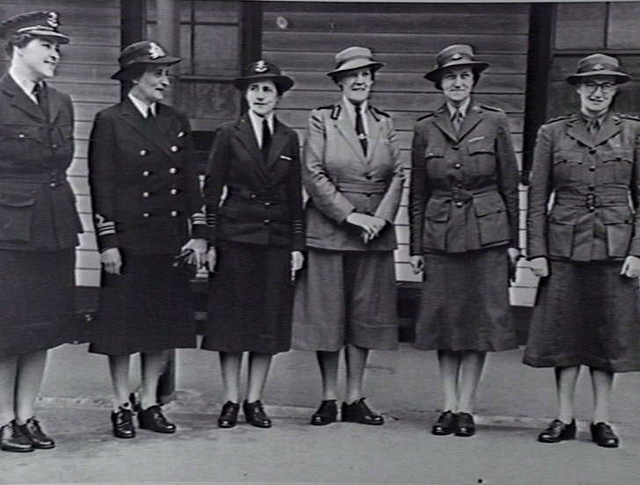
The leaders of the female branches of the Australian military in 1942

Australian women played a larger role in World War II. Many women wanted to play an active role, and hundreds of voluntary women's auxiliary and paramilitary organisations had been formed by 1940. These included the Women's Transport Corps, Women's Flying Club, Women's Emergency Signalling Corps and Women's Australian National Services. In Brisbane alone there were six different organisations providing women with war-related training in July 1940, the largest of which was the Queensland-based Women's National Emergency Legion. The Federal Government and military did not initially support women being trained to serve in the armed forces, however, and these organisations were not taken seriously by the general public.

A shortage of male recruits forced the military to establish female branches in 1941 and 1942. The RAAF established the Women's Auxiliary Australian Air Force (WAAAF) in March 1941, the Army formed the Australian Women's Army Service (AWAS) in October 1941 and the Australian Army Medical Women's Service in December 1942 and the Women's Royal Australian Naval Service (WRANS) came into being in July 1942. In 1944 almost 50,000 women were serving in the military and thousands more had joined the civilian Australian Women's Land Army (AWLA). Many of these women were trained to undertake skilled work in traditionally male occupations in order to free servicemen for operational service. Women were also encouraged to work in industry and volunteer for air raid precautions duties or clubs for Australian and Allied servicemen. The female branches of the military were disbanded after the war.

=== Korean War ===
Manpower shortages during the Korean War led to the permanent establishment of female branches of the military. In 1951 the WRANS was reformed and the Army and Air Force established the Women's Australian Army Corps (WAAC) and Women's Royal Australian Air Force (WRAAF) respectively. The proportion of women in the services was initially limited to four percent of their strength, though this was ignored by the RAAF. The quota was lifted to 10 percent in the RAAF and RAN during the 1960s and 1970s while the Army recruited only on a replacement basis.

== Integration ==
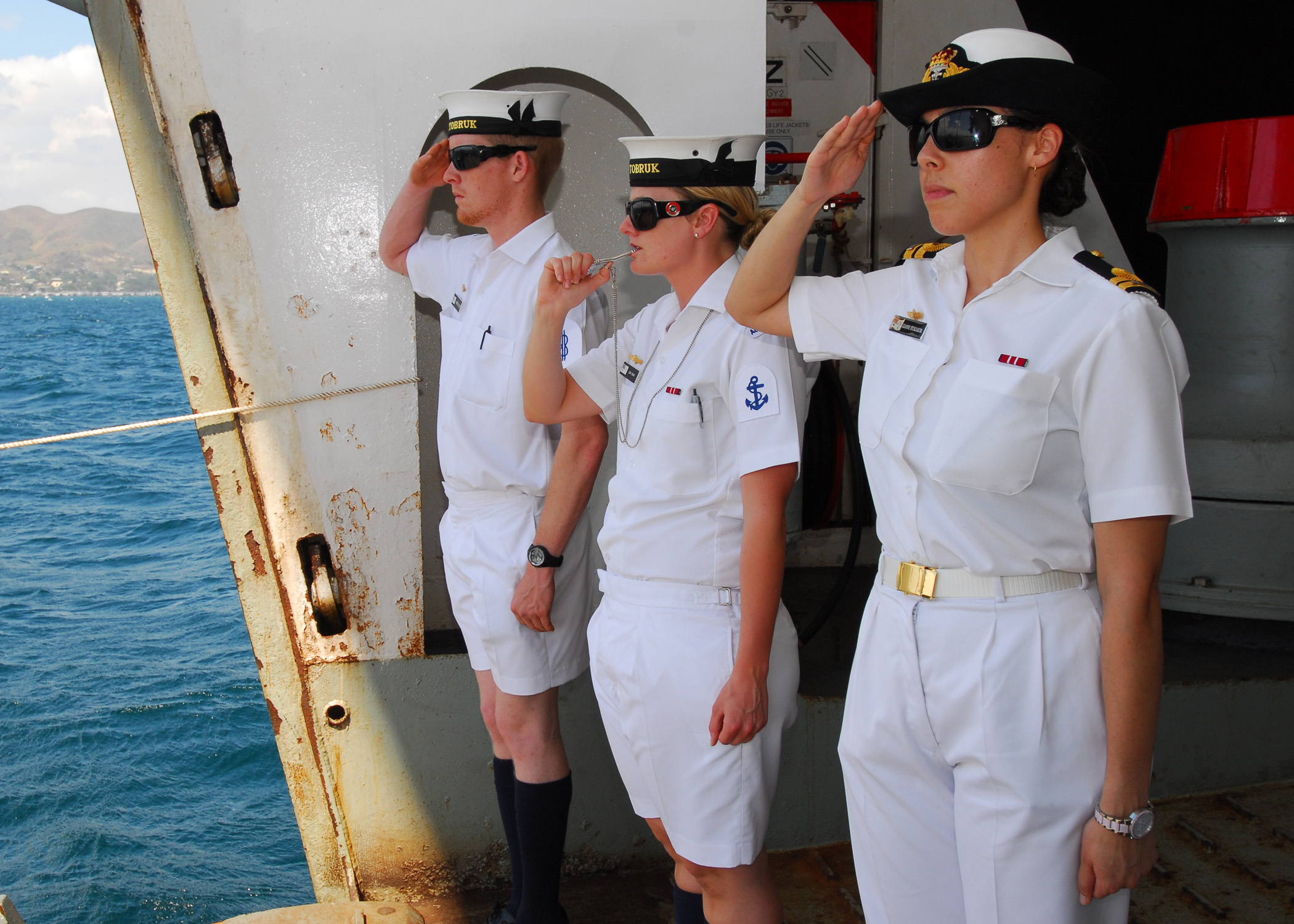
Male and female sailors on board HMAS Tobruk in 2010

The role of women in the Australian military began to change in the 1970s. In 1975, which was the International Year of Women, the service chiefs established a committee to explore opportunities for increased female participation in the military. This led to reforms which allowed women to deploy on active service in support roles, pregnancy no longer being grounds for automatic termination of employment and changes to leave provisions. The WRAAF and WAAC were abolished in 1977 and 1979 respectively, with female soldiers being merged into the services. Equal pay was granted to servicewomen in 1979 and the WRANS was abolished in 1985.

Despite being integrated into the military, there were still restrictions on female service. The ADF was granted an exemption from the Sex Discrimination Act 1984 when it was introduced in 1984 so that it could maintain gender-based restrictions against women serving in combat or combat-related positions, which limited women to 40 percent of positions in the ADF.

=== Combat-related roles ===
As a result of personnel shortages in the late 1980s the restriction against women in combat-related positions was dropped in May 1990, and women were for the first time allowed to serve in warships, RAAF combat squadrons and many positions in the Army. Women were banned from positions involving physical combat, however, and were unable to serve in infantry, armoured, artillery and engineering units in the Army and clearance diving and ground defence positions in the RAN and RAAF respectively. In 1990, three C-130 Hercules Air Force female pilots of No. 36 Squadron were employed in combat related roles.

The ADF was not sufficiently prepared for integrating women into all units. Integration was hindered by entrenched discriminatory attitudes, sexual harassment and a perception that less demanding standards were applied to women. This led to a number of scandals, including allegations of sexual harassment on board HMAS Swan, and the RAN's mishandling of these complaints. These scandals did great harm to the ADF's reputation at the time when it most needed servicewomen. The Defence Equality Organisation was established in 1997 in response to these problems, and it developed frameworks to facilitate the acceptance of women throughout the ADF.

== Deployments ==
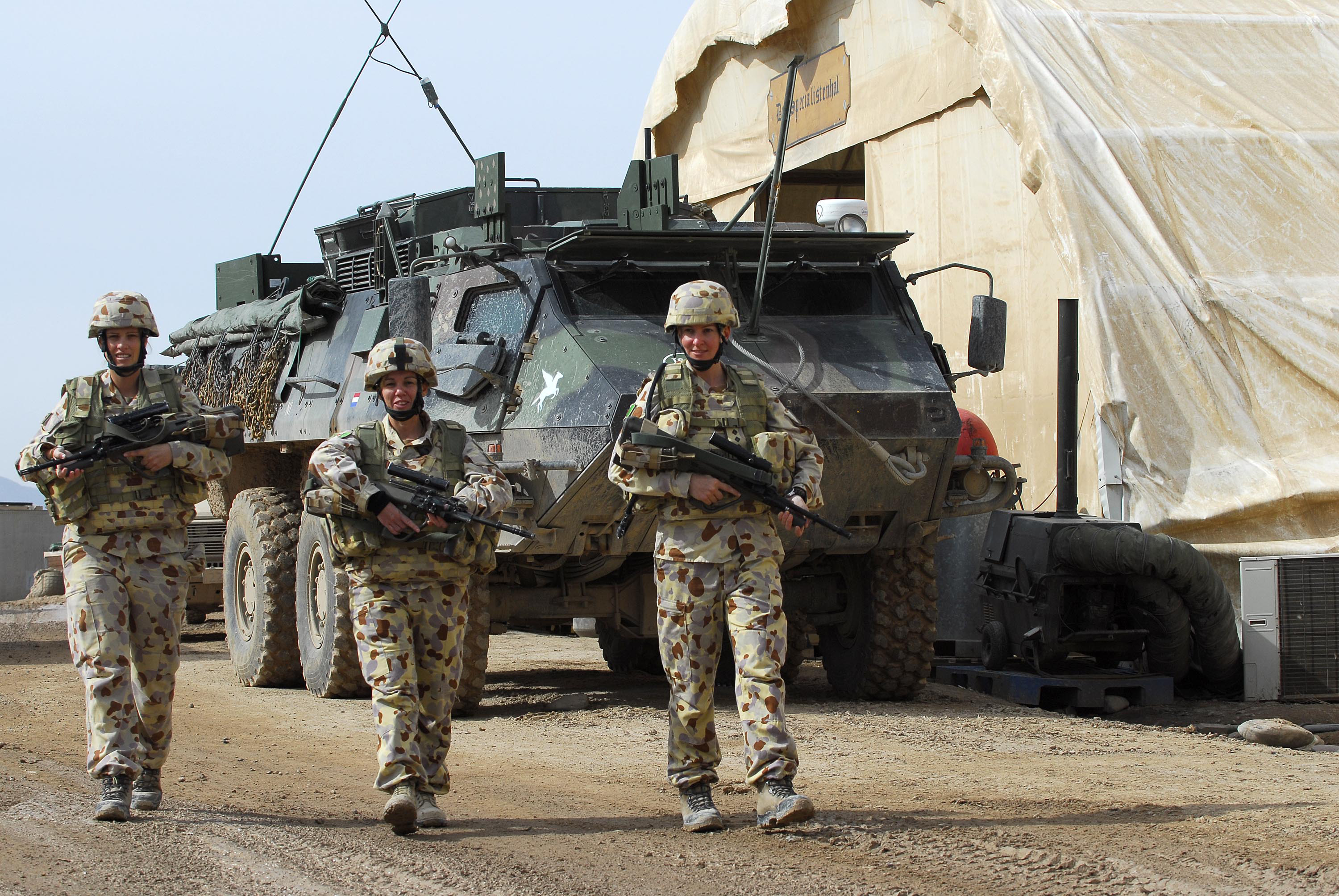
Female Australian soldiers in Afghanistan

Women have formed part of ADF deployments around the world since the early 1990s. Female sailors were sent into a combat zone for the first time on board HMAS Westralia in 1991, female medical personnel were deployed to Iraq, Western Sahara and Rwanda during the early 1990s and 440 of the 5,500 Australians deployed to East Timor in November 1999 were women. Women also began to be promoted to command units in the late 1990s, and Air Commodore Julie Hammer became the first woman to reach one-star rank in 2000.

In 2015, 335 women were participating in overseas operations in frontline support positions, including in Afghanistan.

== Women in combat roles ==
On 27 September 2011, Defence Minister Stephen Smith announced that women will be allowed to serve in frontline combat roles by 2016. Women became able to apply for all positions other than special forces roles in the Army on 1 January 2013. Women became able to apply for special forces roles on 1 January 2014 following validation of physical employment standards. Women have been directly recruited into all frontline combat positions since 1 January 2016.

On 26 October 2018, the Civil Law and Justice Legislation Amendment Act 2018 repealed section 43 of the Sex Discrimination Act 1984 which had provided the ADF with an exemption to allow discrimination against women "in connection with employment, engagement or appointment" involving combat duties that required a person "to commit, or to participate directly in the commission of, an act of violence against an adversary in time of war". (Note: The Act originally provided an exemption to allow discrimination against women for "combat duties" and "combat-related duties". In May 1990, all combat-related duties became open to women. The Sex Discrimination Amendment Act 1995 removed combat-related duties from the Sex Discrimination Act 1984.)

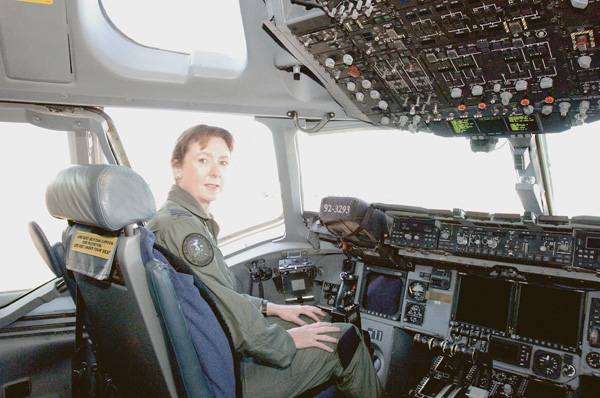
Wing Commander Linda Corbould, the first woman to command a Royal Australian Air Force flying squadron.

=== Women fighter pilots ===
Women have been eligible for flying roles in the RAAF since 1987, with Flight-Lieutenant Robyn Williams and Officer Cadet Deborah Hicks becoming the service's first women pilots in 1988. In 1992, restrictions were lifted allowing women to train as fast jet pilots. Between 1987 and 2016, 42 of the 60 women who had commenced pilot training had qualified as pilots and five who had been selected and attempted training courses for the force's fighter jets did not pass. Women had served as fast jet aircrew with the first two in 2000 graduating from the No. 6 Squadron conversion course to become General Dynamics F-111 Navigators (later known as a Air Combat Officer). A 2016 Australian Human Rights Commission report found that "the absence of female fast jet pilots is remarkable" given that the air forces of many comparable countries have had female fighter pilots since the 1990s. The report judged that there was no single factor responsible for this, rather, there are a series of structural and cultural factors that have prevented the progress of both female and male pilots in the Air Force. The Air Force accepted the majority of the recommendations.

In December 2017, the first two female RAAF fighter pilots graduated from the No. 2 Operational Conversion Unit course to become F/A-18 Hornet pilots.

=== Women in special forces ===
Women have passed the selection course for the Army Reserve 1st Commando Regiment and been awarded a Green Beret. In 1981, Army Reserve signaller Kerri Hiam of 126th Signal Squadron became the first woman to attempt selection, pass selection and be awarded a Green Beret. In 1997, three Army women officers, including intelligence officer Lieutenant Fleur Froggatt, became the first women to complete the 1st Commando Regiment officer selection course with one of the officers awarded a Green Beret. A 2012 government report stated that female medics had been serving in Afghanistan on patrols with special forces units (the Special Operations Task Group) providing health clinics for local women and girls.

== Growing numbers of women in the ADF ==
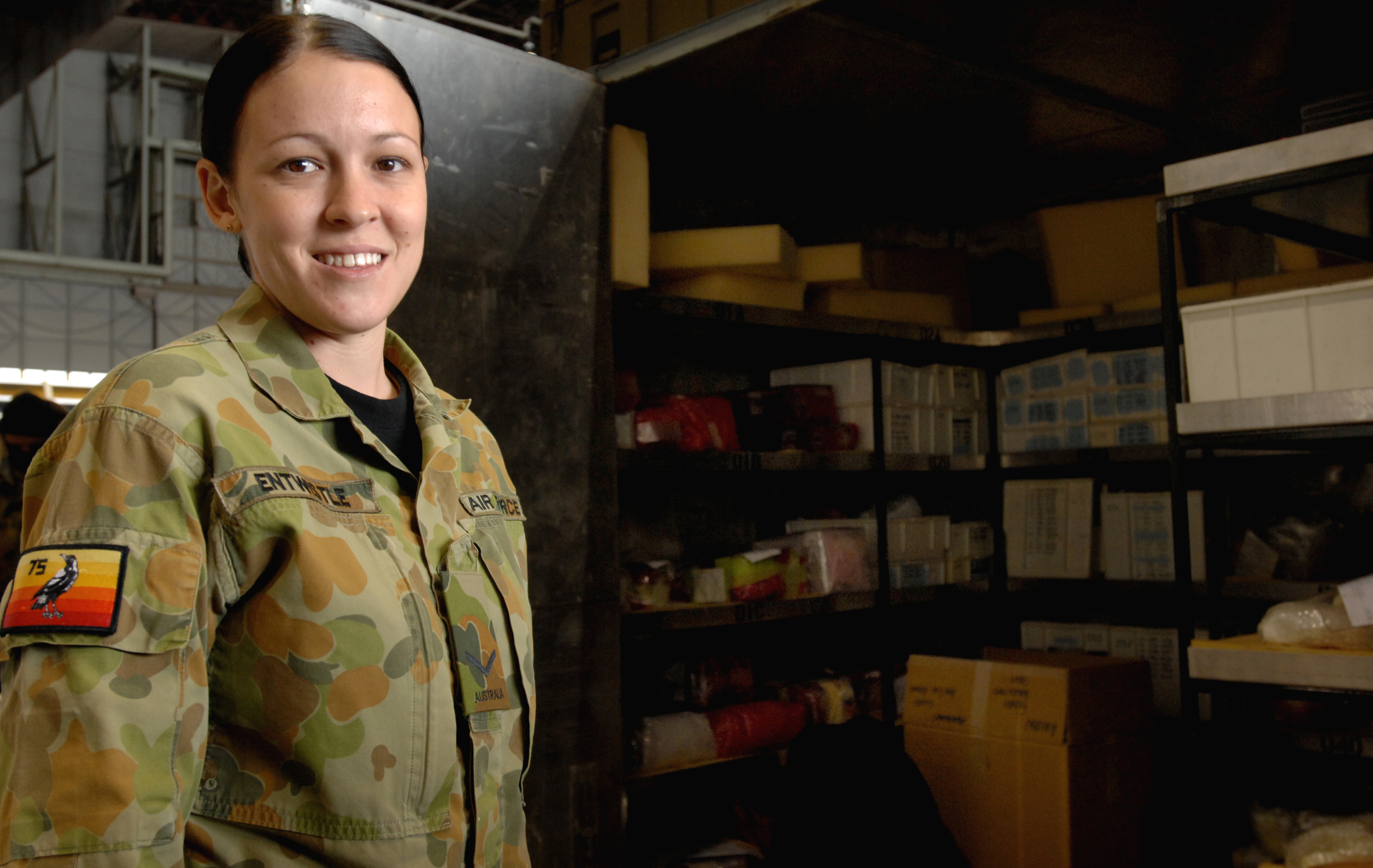
A female member of No. 75 Squadron RAAF in 2008

Since the expansion in the number of positions available to women, there has been slow but steady growth in the percentage of female permanent defence personnel. In the 1989–1990 financial year women filled 11.4% of permanent ADF positions. In the 2005–2006 financial year women occupied 13.3% of permanent positions and 15.6% of reserve positions. During the same period the proportion of civilian positions filled by women in the Australian Defence Organisation increased from 30.8% to 40.3%. The percentage of female members of the Australian labour force increased from approximately 41% to 45% between June 1989 and June 2006.

In 2008 defence minister, Joel Fitzgibbon instructed the ADF to place a greater emphasis on recruiting women and addressing barriers to women being promoted to senior roles.

In 2017-18, women made up 17.9% of The ADF workforce, and increase of 3.5 percentage points from 2013 (14.4%). There are still proportionally fewer women than men in senior leadership roles.

=== Completion of basic training ===
There are lower fitness requirements for women, resulting in slightly higher initial-entry training completion for females in 2017-18, with general entry (other ranks/ non-officer) 91.9 per cent for women; 90.2 per cent for men. Similarly, the 2017-18 officer trainee completion rate in the Navy and Airforce were at 87.8 per cent for women; 81.9 per cent for men, and the Army officer trainees at 66.7 per cent for women; 65.8 per cent for men.

=== Recruitment goals and strategies ===
Each of the Services has set female participation targets to be achieved by 2023. These are 25 per cent for the Navy, 15 per cent for the Army and 25 per cent for the Air Force.

In August 2016 the Chief of Army Lieutenant General Angus Campbell AO, DSC, in an address to the Defence Force Recruiting Conference stated that his “number one priority.. with respect to recruitment is increasing our diversity; with a focus on women and Indigenous Australians”, and that “My aim is that women will make up 25% of the Army – based on analysis of best practice across like work environments globally (military and appropriately related industries). I want and need the Army to benefit from the full talent of the other half of our citizens.” Since the Chief of Army has changed as of the 2nd of July 2018 to Lieutenant General Rick Burr AO, DSC, MVO, it is unknown whether he will strive to achieve the larger 25% target as his predecessor did.

The Services use specialised media campaigns aimed at women and reduced initial minimum period of service (IMPS) contracts (eg. 2 years instead of 4 years for certain roles) to attract and recruit women and have recruitment targets to increase the number of women in under-represented roles. Partially due to IMPS reductions the Air Force achieved female initial-entry enlistment targets in 2017-18.

The ‘Gap year’ program, aimed at younger women with only 1 year IMPS existing across each branch of ADF excels in female recruitment. Although small in number, 2018 recruitment rates of women were at 55% (Navy), 47% (Air force), and 34% (Army).

== See also ==
- Women in Australia
