= Ida F. Butler =

American nurse

- Miss Ida F. Butler in 1919
- Born: March 18, 1868; Watertown, New York
- Died: November 3, 1949 (aged 81); Hartford, Connecticut
- Education: Hartford Hospital Nursing School
- Occupation: American Red Cross nurse

Ida de Fatio Butler (March 18, 1868 – March 11, 1949) was an American nurse. She graduated from the Hartford Hospital Nursing School in 1901.

Butler organized two hospitals in France during World War I. In 1918 she organized the Hospital for Acute Diseases of Children in Lyon, France.

From 1936 to 1939 Butler was the National Nursing Director for the American Red Cross. In January 1937, she was responsible for sending 3,600 nurses from the Red Cross to deal with the aftermath of a flood. She was the fifteenth American recipient of the Florence Nightingale Medal, the highest international distinction for nurses and granted to those who have made exceptional contributions to their profession, with which she was honored in 1937.

She died in West Hartford, Connecticut.
