= Pearl Corkhill =

Australian military nurse of the First World War (1887 – 1985)

Elizabeth (Pearl) Corkhill MM
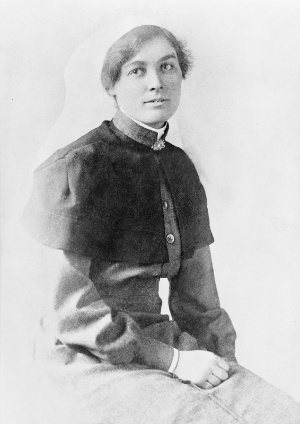
- Studio portrait of Pearl Corkhill
- Born: 11 March 1887; Tilba Tilba, New South Wales
- Died: 4 December 1985 (aged 98); Dalmeny, New South Wales
- Burial place: Narooma, New South Wales
- Military career
- Allegiance: Australia
- Branch: Australian Imperial Force
- Service years: 1915–1919
- Rank: Sister
- Unit: Australian Army Nursing Service
- Conflicts: First World War
- Awards: Military Medal

Elizabeth Pearl Corkhill, MM (11 March 1887 – 4 December 1985) was an Australian military nurse of the First World War. Trained as a nurse in Sydney, Corkhill enlisted in the Australian Imperial Force on 4 June 1915. After serving in France at the 1st and 3rd Australian General Hospitals, Corkhill was assigned to the 38th British Casualty Clearing Station near Abbeville on 21 August 1918. On 23 August, while the camp was being heavily bombed by enemy aircraft, Corkhill remained calm and continued to tend to her patients, despite the danger. For her bravery, she was awarded the Military Medal, one of only seven Australian nurses to be so decorated in the First World War. Following the Armistice, she went on to work as a nurse at various public hospitals, and donated a large collection of her father's photographs to the National Library of Australia.

== Early life ==
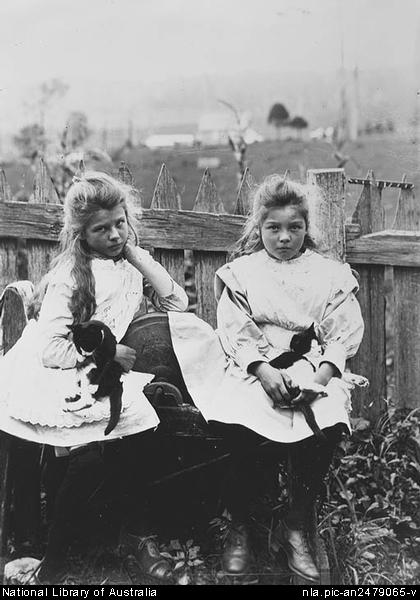
A photograph of Pearl (right) and her sister, Edith (left), taken by their father in 1894.

Corkhill was born on 11 March 1887, the second child of William Henry Corkhill, a grazier and photographer, and Francis Hawtrey née Bate. Growing up on the family ranch, "Marengo", near Tilba Tilba in southern New South Wales, Corkhill, her sister Edith and brother Norman's lives were extensively recorded by their father, who by 1890 had become a professional photographer. She was first educated by a governess before attending the public school in town. She undertook nursing training at a private hospital in Summer Hill, Sydney and qualified as a general nurse in 1914.

== Military years ==
On 4 June 1915, Corkhill enrolled as a staff nurse in the Australian Imperial Force. She left Fremantle aboard the A62 Wandila on 25 June 1915, and arrived in Egypt in July that year. She was assigned to the 1st Australian General Hospital, and assisted in the treatment of soldiers involved with the Gallipoli Campaign. On 24 March 1916, Corkhill was among a group of nurses sent to Marseille aboard the Braemar Castle, a hospital ship. Arriving in early April, she was then sent aboard a train destined for the 2nd British General Hospital in Le Havre. The train was poorly equipped and was missing many amenities, such as toilets or water, so the women were forced to improvise by washing with cologne. In her time at the British hospital, Corkhill looked forward to returning to an Australian hospital and being "amongst our boys"; the Australian soldiers often found their compatriots to be friendlier than the British nurses. On Anzac Day 1916, a year after the landing at Gallipoli, Corkhill and two other Australian nurses commemorated the occasion. They wore gum tree leaves on their capes, and gave small packets of cigarettes and matches to the Australians who were interned at the hospital as gifts.

Corkhill went back to serve at the 1st Australian General Hospital in Rouen on 16 June 1916 for the remainder of the year. On 23 January 1917, she went to England on leave until 9 February. She then served at the Australian Hospital until July 1918, with the exception of her two leaves; to England in October 1917 and to Paris in February 1918. On 15 May 1918, Corkhill was sent to Abbeville to join the 3rd Australian General Hospital, and was briefly posted to the 38th British Casualty Clearing Station on 2 June. After serving in with the 3rd Australian General Hospital for a further two months, she was again posted to the Casualty Clearing Station on 21 August 1918.

=== Military Medal ===
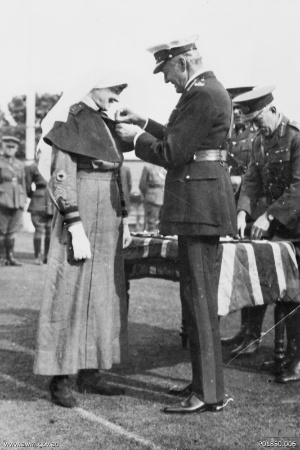
Governor-General Lord Foster presenting Corkhill with the Military Medal.

Casualty Clearing Stations were deliberately sited as close to the front line as possible, since many injuries caused during battle required more urgent attention than the time to travel to a field hospital allowed. Often within seven miles of the front line, they were considered extremely dangerous, and the appropriateness of having nurses attend such stations was hotly debated within the military. As a result of its proximity to the front, the station would often come under enemy attack, as was the case of the 38th British Casualty Station on 23 August. The Casualty Station suffered a heavy air raid by German forces, with the sterilisation room being destroyed and the camp being hit by numerous bombs. Despite the heavy attack, Corkhill, who was attending to the wounded at the time, remained calm and continued to aid the patients. For her actions, she was recommended for and later awarded the Military Medal.

War Office, 23rd August, 1918

His Majesty the KING has been pleased to approve of the award of the Military Medal to the undermentioned Lady for distinguished service in the Field, as recorded: —
Staff Nurse Pearl Elizabeth Corkhill, Aust. A.N.S.

For courage and devotion on the occasion of an enemy air-raid. She continued to attend to the wounded without any regard to her own safety, though enemy aircraft were overhead. Her example was of the greatest value in allaying the alarm of the patients.

Corkhill was initially unconvinced that she deserved the award, being more concerned about having to purchase a new dress to wear while meeting the King. The award was more heavily celebrated by the men than by Corkhill herself, as she described in a letter to her mother:

Today word came that I had been awarded the MM. Well the C.O. sent over a bottle of champagne and they all drank my health and now the medical officers are giving me a dinner in honour of the event. I can't see what I've done to deserve it but the part I don't like is having to face old George and Mary to get the medal. It will cost me a new mess dress, but I suppose I should not grumble at that—I'm still wearing the one I left Australia in.

— Pearl Corkhill

=== Later service ===
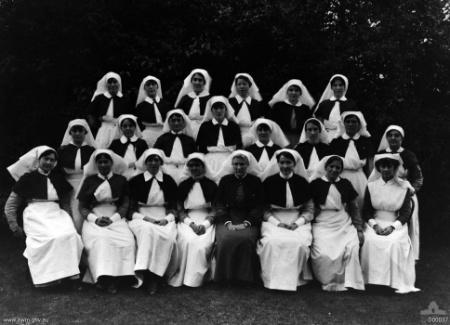
A group portrait of the sisters at the 1st Australian Auxiliary Hospital in 1918.

The day following the action, 24 August, Corkhill was posted to the 1st Australian General Hospital, and went on leave in the United Kingdom. She was retained for service at the 1st Australian Auxiliary Hospital in Harefield, London on 27 August 1918. She was promoted to the rank of Sister on 1 October, and continued to serve at the hospital until She returned to Australia on 24 January 1919. She was discharged on 22 June 1919.

== Later life ==
A supper cloth made by Corkhill while on duty

A memorial commemorating Corkhill's efforts in the war was erected in Tilba, and she was presented with the medal by Governor-General Lord Foster. Following the war, Corkhill went on to pursue a nursing career. After serving as a nurse in various hospitals both in Australia and overseas, Corkhill became the senior sister at the District Hospital in Bega, New South Wales in 1951. In 1975, she donated a large collection of her father's photographs to the National Library of Australia. Amongst the one thousand piece collection were personal photographs along with pictures of the Tilba area, which were later used to create a book, Taken at Tilba, and an engagement calendar. Corkhill was a skilled horsewoman, and was the lead in the centenary Cooma Show. A supper cloth made by Corkhill while on duty has been used as an example of decorative crafts of the era, and a number of photographs she had taken while on duty were donated to the Australian War Memorial. Corkhill died on 4 December 1985 in Dalmeny, New South Wales. She was unmarried.
