= Evelyn Conyers =

NZ-born Australian matron-in-chief

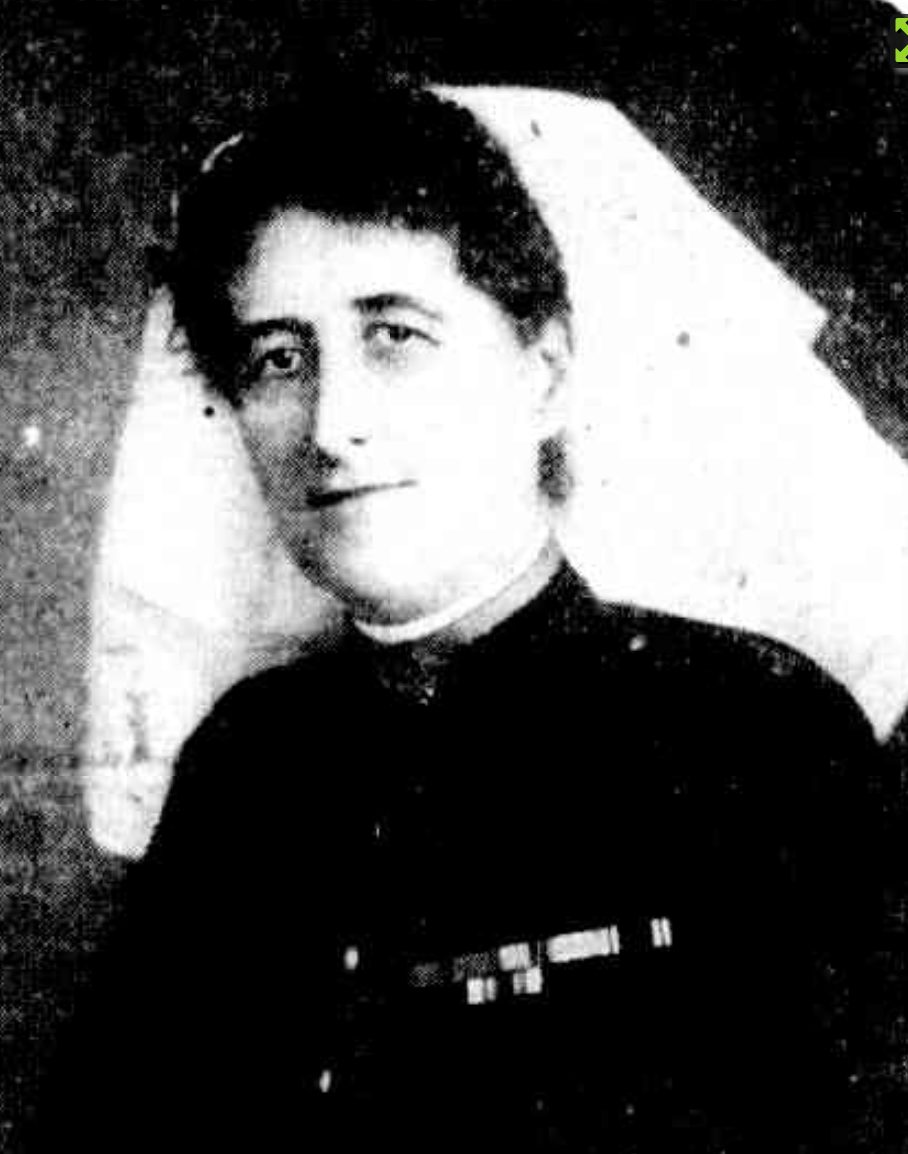
- Born: 1 March 1870; Invercargill, New Zealand
- Died: 6 September 1944 (aged 74); Richmond, Victoria, Australia
- Burial place: Boroondara Cemetery, Kew, Victoria
- Military career
- Allegiance: Australia
- Branch: Australian Army
- Service years: 1903–1920
- Rank: Matron
- Commands: Australian Army Nursing Service (1916–20)
- Conflicts: First World War
- Awards: Commander of the Order of the British Empire; Royal Red Cross & Bar; Mentioned in Despatches; Florence Nightingale Medal

Evelyn Augusta Conyers, CBE, RRC & Bar (1 March 1870 – 6 September 1944) was a New Zealand-born Australian matron-in-chief of the Australian Army Nursing Service during the First World War. She was its first member to be awarded the Florence Nightingale Medal, the highest award for nursing service.

== Early life and training ==
Conyers was born at Invercargill, New Zealand, on 1 March 1870 to William and Fanny (née Mainprize).

After completing her secondary education in New Zealand, Conyers migrated to Victoria where she trained as a nurse at the Melbourne Children's Hospital until 1894 and then the Melbourne Hospital from which she graduated in 1896.

== Nursing career ==
In 1901 Conyers was appointed matron of a private hospital in Melbourne. A year later she applied for register a patent for "an improved supporting frame to be used with slipper bed-pan".

Conyers was one of the original members of the Australian Army Nursing Service which was formed in 1903.

== First World War ==
Conyers enlisted in the Australian Imperial Force on 11 October 1914. In January 1916 she was appointed Matron-in-chief of the 1st Australian General Hospital. Conyers was mentioned in a despatch of General Sir John Maxwell "in connection with services rendered in Egypt". In September 1916 she was awarded the Royal Red Cross "for conspicuous services rendered" and later a Bar "in recognition of her valuable nursing service". On 1 January 1919 King George V appointed Conyers a Commander of the Order of the British Empire. In 1921 she was awarded the Florence Nightingale Medal with diploma.

Her war service complete, Conyers left London for Australia in December 1919 per Orvieto and was discharged on 7 March 1920.

== Death ==
Conyers died on 6 September 1944 in Epworth Private Hospital, Richmond and was buried at Boroondara Cemetery.

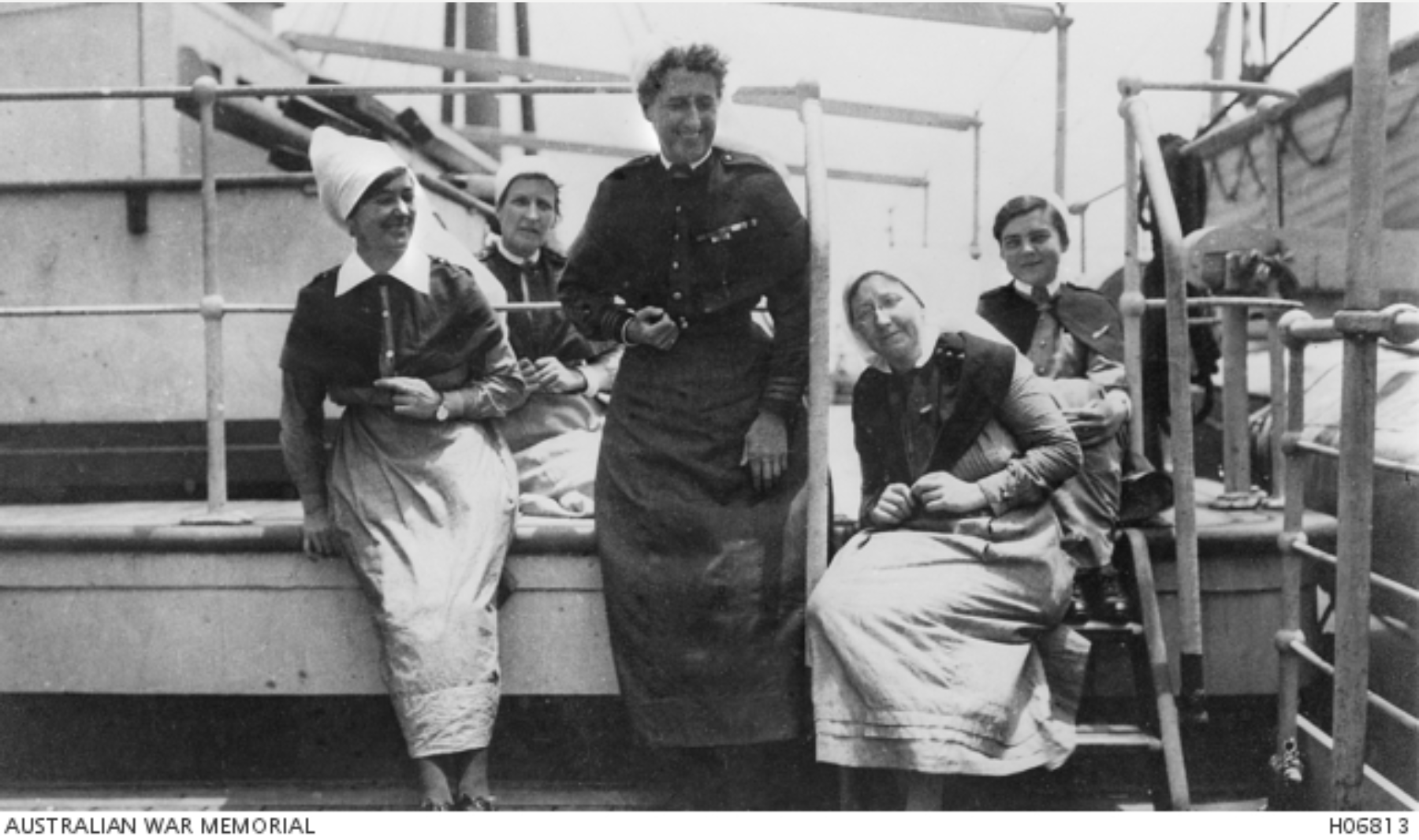
Conyers (centre) and four nurses on board Troopship Orvieto on voyage home to Australia

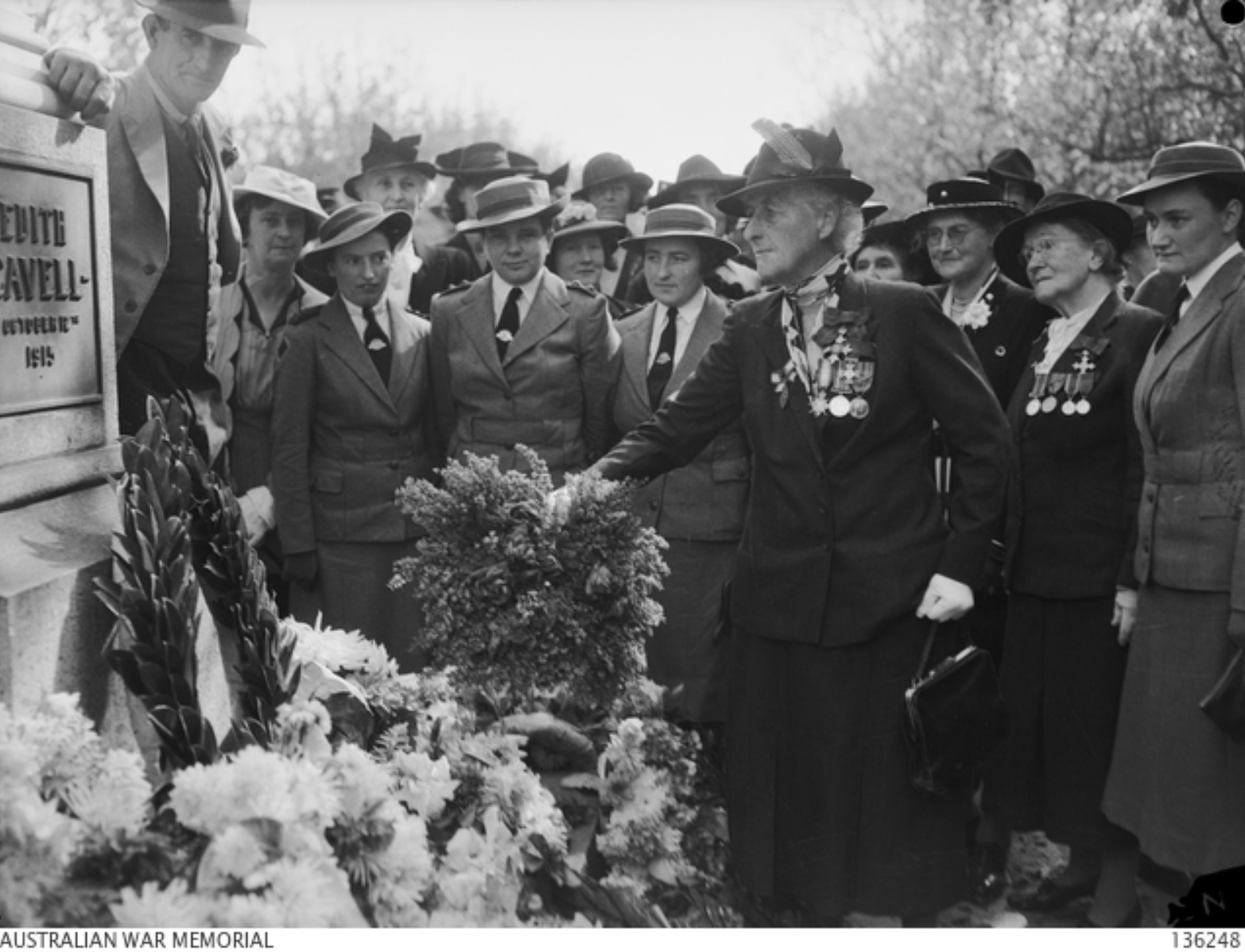
Conyers laying a wreath on the Edith Cavell Memorial in Melbourne, Anzac Day 1942
