= Alma E. Foerster =

American nurse

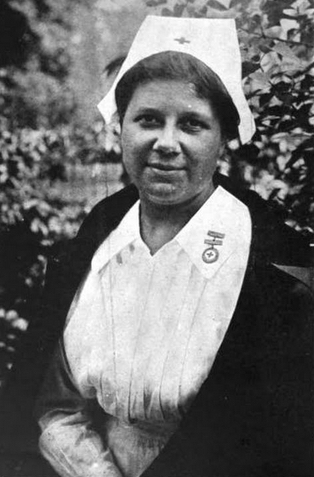
- circa 1920
- Born: July 25, 1885; Ontarioville, Illinois
- Died: August 1, 1967 (aged 82); Chicago, Illinois
- Occupation: nurse
- Years active: 1910-1940s
- Known for: An inaugural recipient of the Florence Nightingale Medal, who had service in Archangel, Russia during the Russian Revolution.

Alma E. Foerster (1885–1967) was an American nurse who worked in both civilian and military care. She began her career as a public health nurse in Chicago and during the First World War helped establish hospitals in Kiev, for which she received the Cross of Saint Anna. She worked in Romania, receiving the Order of the Cross of Queen Marie for her service, before being sent on a humanitarian mission to Archangel, Russia. As one of only two American Red Cross nurses in Archangel, she provided assistance at the military surgical hospital, while the other nurse assisted with civilian nursing. She was one of the inaugural recipients of the Florence Nightingale Medal in 1920. After her return to the United States, she worked in the United States Public Health Service as a nurse, instructor and director of nursing in Chicago, Mobile, Ann Arbor and Racine, before returning to Chicago where she ended her career.

== Early life ==
Alma E. Foerster was born on 25 July 1885 in Ontarioville, Cook County, Illinois to Friederike (née Boerner) and Rev. Paul Foerster, who were German immigrants. Foerster obtained a diploma from Presbyterian School of Nursing in Chicago in 1910.

== Career ==
Foerster's career began as a public health nurse working with the Infant Welfare and Jewish Aid Societies of Chicago. In 1911, she enrolled as a relief nurse with the American Red Cross and began working at Michael Reese Hospital. She joined the disaster relief nurses of the Red Cross to help with the 1913 Ohio flood. In September 1914, Foerster went with a contingent of Red Cross nurses from Chicago to establish a hospital in Kiev. In June, 1915, Foerster, along with Charlotte Burgess, Alice Gilbourne and Rachel Torrance were transferred from the Kiev units to the Serbian Units. They returned in August to the United States and Foerster was recognized by the Russian government with the Cross of Saint Anna for her service. Forester began working at the Presbyterian Hospital in Chicago, where she remained until 1916. Simultaneously, she was working at the Rush Medical Dispensary, where she served as head nurse. In 1917, the Red Cross sent her to Romania and after serving for a year, she was awarded with a brevet order third class for her service from the Romanian government. The following year, she was awarded the Order of the Cross of Queen Marie by the Romanian government.

From Romania, Foerster was sent to Archangel, Russia where she served until 1919. The Russian assignment, included a party of eleven members, two of whom were nurses, Forester and a New Jersey nurse, Beatrice M. Gosling. Their task was to deliver 4,200 tons of food and medical supplies to civilians in Archangel, but when they arrived, they realized the conditions were much worse than had been anticipated. Intense fighting between the Bolshevik forces, White Army and Allied troops from the British and U.S. Armies during the Russian Civil War had left a dire situation. Civilians, cut off by ice and conflict had to depend on the humanitarian aid provided by the small Red Cross and YWCA units. The nurses who were serving at the hospital were facing starvation and were willing to care for the troops in exchange for food. Gosling ended up helping with civilian relief while Forester assisted in the operating room of a small "Annex" hospital set up in a chapel by the Red Cross to care for wounded and sick soldiers. When the ice finally broke in the spring of 1919, Gosling and Foerster were returned to the U.S. and the American Red Cross Hospital was closed. Upon her return, Foerster became one of the inaugural winners of the Florence Nightingale Medal, first awarded in 1920, for exemplary nursing service.

Foerster was appointed as supervisor at Michael Reese Hospital and worked there until she accepted a position to work at the U.S. Public Health Service in Mobile, Alabama in 1922. Foerster was placed at Marine Hospital Number 13. In 1927, she became an instructor and the Supervisor of the Outpatient Department of the University of Michigan Hospital. She was tasked with teaching public health practices to student nurses. In 1934, Foerster moved to Racine, Wisconsin to serve as the Director of Nursing Activities of the Red Cross chapter of Racine and was in charge of the Public Health Nursing Service for the area. While working in Racine, she oversaw the four "well baby stations", located throughout the city, which allowed women to bring children up to five years old for a medical consultation and evaluation. She also oversaw conferences which covered parenting and prenatal care, which the Red Cross sponsored in conjunction with the local Junior League.

By 1940, she had moved back to the Chicago area, where she remained until her death on 1 August 1967.
