= Roselyn Nugba-Ballah =

Liberian nurse

- Citizenship: Liberia
- Occupation: Nurse
- Employer: Liberian Red Cross
- Awards: Florence Nightingale Medal

Roselyn Nugba-Ballah is a nurse from Liberia, who was a recipient of the Florence Nightingale Medal in 2017.

== Biography ==
Nugba-Ballah studied for a BSc in Nursing from Mother Patern College of Health Sciences in Monrovia. She also has a MA in Health Care Policy and Management from the Cuttington University, as well a Diploma in Project Management awarded by Liberia Institute of Public Administration (LIPA). She began work for the Liberian Red Cross in 2014. She was motivated to get involved in work against Ebola, because of its effect on women in terms of their roles as care givers, but also because of the economic impact on women's lives due to their jobs as market traders, for example.

== Role in Liberia's Ebola Virus Epidemic ==
Nugba-Ballah was Supervisor of the Liberian Red Cross' Safe and Dignified Burial Team during the Ebola outbreak. She ensured that all bodies were collected, often from the streets, and buried. She was known for wearing medical scrubs with Winnie-the-Pooh on them. The team worked particularly in Monrovia and its surroundings. One section of the 140-strong burial team, had the nickname during the crisis was Body Team 12. During their work, Nugba-Bullah and her team faced social discrimination at they worked closely with victims of the disease. Well aware of the physical and psychological risks, Nugba-Ballah arranged for mental health support for the team. Nugba-Ballah and her team's work contributed research to international understanding of the crisis, especially rates of morbidity. She contributed to research on the estimation of the risk of infection as a result of unsafe burial practices.

== Florence Nightingale Medal ==
Nugba-Ballah was awarded the Florence Nightingale Medal in 2017 for her work with the Liberian Red Cross, particularly in disaster situations. In her acceptance speech, she said that: "This medal is for all of us. We all worked for it, and we deserve it together". She has received 45 other distinct international awards for her services to healthcare. She is an advocate for women's education in Liberia.
