= Alicia Kelly =

Australian nurse (1874–1942)

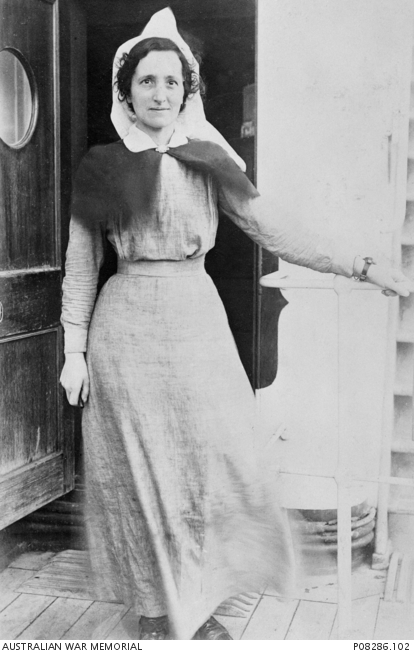
- Born: Alicia Mary Kelly; 16 September 1874; Galway, Ireland
- Died: 16 April 1942 (aged 67); Midland, Western Australia
- Military career
- Allegiance: Australia
- Branch: Australian Imperial Force
- Service years: 1915–1918
- Rank: Sister
- Nickname: "Loll"
- Conflicts: First World War
- Awards: Associate Royal Red Cross; Military Medal

Alicia Mary Chipper, ARRC, MM (née Kelly; 16 September 1874 – 16 April 1942) was an Irish-born Australian nurse. She was awarded the Associate Royal Red Cross and the Military Medal for her bravery during the First World War.

== Early life ==
Kelly was born in Galway, Ireland, on 16 September 1874 to Richard Kelly, a farmer, and Bridget Jane (née Bell). Few details are known about her early life in Ireland. In 1910 she was qualifying as a nurse at the (Royal) Melbourne Hospital. She then went to work for three years at the Royal Victorian Eye and Ear Hospital. She was then at a private ear, nose and throat facility.

== First World War ==
The First World War began in 1914 and in 1915 Kelly joined the Australian Army Nursing Service as a staff nurse. Her mother was then living in Mount Dandenong. She left for Egypt and worked with the 1st Australian General Hospital during the Gallipoli campaign. She returned to Australia twice in 1915 on board the SS Euripides as she cared for the severely wounded soldiers who were being returned to Australia. In the following April she and the 1st Australian General Hospital were sent to France. In April 1917 she was with the 29th Casualty Clearing Station when she became a sister and in July she was posted to the 3rd Australian Casualty Clearing Station.

During an attack in France at Rouen Kelly refused to leave her patients. She covered the heads of the patients with bedpans to give them a feeling of security and she held the hand of another patient. In 1917 the London Gazette recorded that she had been awarded the Military Medal. Only seven Australian nurses received the Military Medal during the First World War, the award being for "conspicuous gallantry under fire". Kelly was invested with her Military Medal at Buckingham Palace on 16 October 1917. She also received the Associate Royal Red Cross.

== Death and legacy ==
Kelly died of pneumonia in Midland, Western Australia, on 16 April 1942, having returned to work despite her health issues. Her medals are part of her display at the Army Museum of Western Australia.
