= Mary E. Gladwin =

English-American nurse (1861–1939)

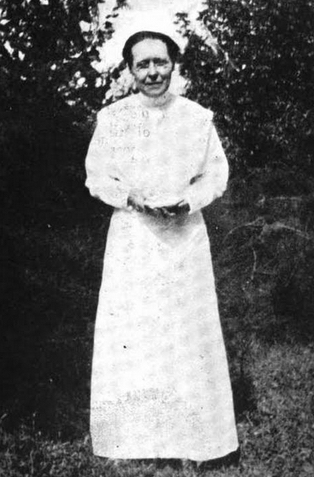
- Mary E. Gladwin, from a 1921 publication.
- Born: December 24, 1861; Stoke-upon-Trent, Staffordshire
- Died: November 22, 1939 (aged 77)
- Citizenship: American
- Occupation: nurse
- Known for: American nurse in the Spanish–American War, the Russo-Japanese War, and World War I

Mary Elizabeth Gladwin (December 24, 1861 – November 22, 1939) was an English-born American Red Cross nurse active in three wars. She was one of the first six American nurses to receive the Florence Nightingale Medal when it was awarded by the International Committee of the Red Cross in 1920.

== Early life ==
Mary Elizabeth Gladwin was born in Stoke-upon-Trent, Staffordshire, the daughter of Francis Gladwin and Sarah Gladwin. She was a little child when the family moved to the United States, settling in Akron, Ohio. She graduated from Buchtel College in 1887 (now The University of Akron). She trained as a nurse in Boston, finally completing her formal studies in 1902, after much experience in the field.

== Career ==
Gladwin was a science teacher in Norwalk, Ohio after finishing college. Her first work as a war nurse was while she was still a nursing student, during the Spanish–American War in 1898, treating soldiers with typhoid fever in Chickamauga, Georgia. She was soon included in American Red Cross units assigned to Cuba, Puerto Rico, and the Philippines as well. She was awarded a Spanish War Service Medal for her service. During the Russo-Japanese War she joined an American Red Cross unit, assisting Japanese nurses at Hiroshima. The Japanese emperor personally presented Gladwin with the Imperial Order of the Crown for her service.

She was superintendent at Beverly Hospital in Massachusetts from 1904 to 1907, and at Woman's Hospital in New York City from 1907 to 1913. At home in Ohio, she worked with the Red Cross during the Great Dayton Flood of 1913. She was head of women's employment at the B. F. Goodrich Tire Company in Ohio, and was superintendent at the City Hospital in Cleveland. She was also president of the Ohio State Nurses Association and chaired the National Committee on Red Cross Nursing in 1911.

During World War I, Gladwin went to Serbia with the American Red Cross, to work at a hospital in Belgrade, and later at Salonica in Greece. She received the Serbian Cross of Charity medal for her service there, and in 1920 was one of the first six American nurses to receive the Florence Nightingale Medal from the International Committee of the Red Cross. After World War I, Gladwin worked as a hospital administrator and nursing instructor in New York and Minnesota. She wrote two books, Ethics: Talks to Nurses (1930) and a biography of Jane Delano (1931), and articles for the American Journal of Nursing. She was also a frequent speaker for students and women's groups, especially after 1929. "If the fathers and mothers could have seen what I have seen on the bloody battlefields," she said, "there never would be another war."

== Death and legacy ==
Gladwin died in 1939 at Akron City Hospital, aged 77 years. In 1978, the new building for the School of Nursing at Akron University was named Mary E. Gladwin Hall. Her papers, including diary, photographs, and an unpublished memoir, are archived at the University of Akron, but her medals were donated to the Summit County Historical Society.
