= Rachael Pratt =

Australian army nurse (1874–1954)

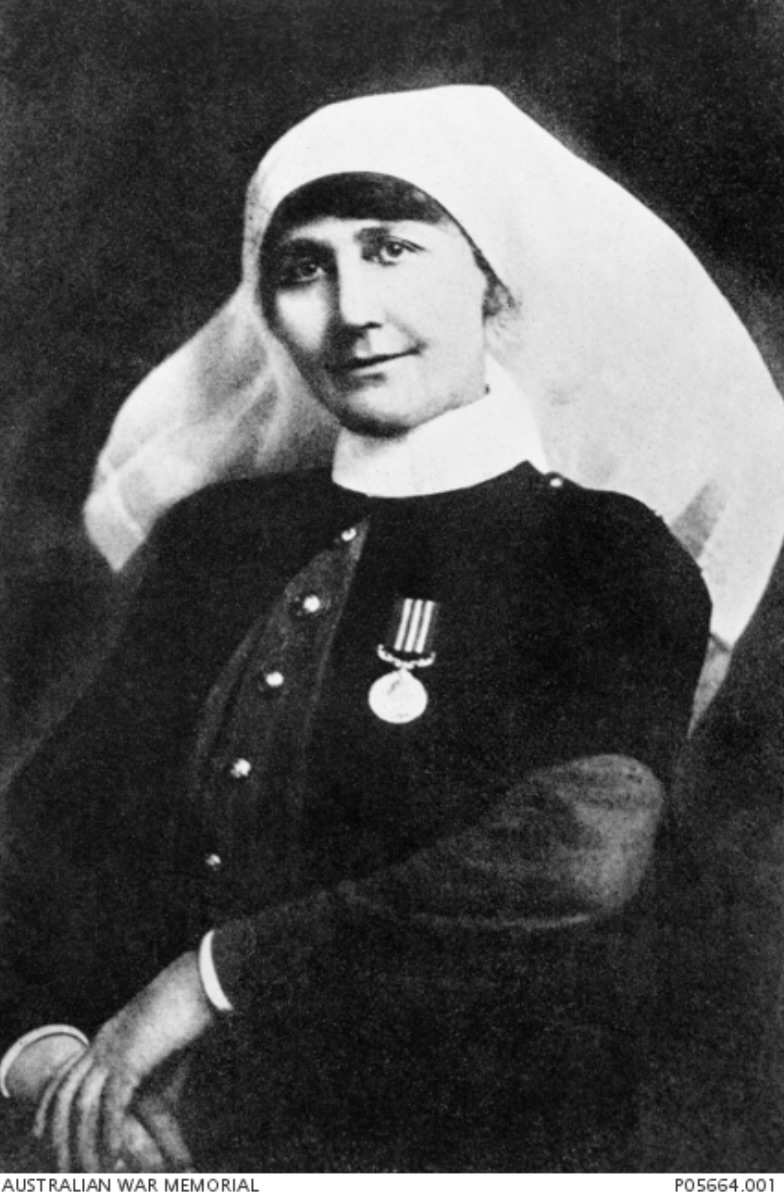
- Pratt with her Military Medal, c. 1918
- Born: 18 July 1874; Mumbannar, Heywood, Victoria
- Died: 23 March 1954 (aged 79); Heidelberg, Victoria
- Military career
- Allegiance: Australia
- Branch: Australian Imperial Force
- Service years: 1915–1919
- Rank: Sister
- Unit: Australian Army Nursing Service
- Conflicts: First World War
- Awards: Military Medal

Rachael Pratt, MM (18 July 1874 – 23 March 1954), sometimes spelt Rachel Pratt, was an Australian army nurse. She served with the Australian Army Nursing Service during the First World War and was one of only seven Australian nurses awarded the Military Medal.

== Early life and education ==
Pratt was born on 18 July 1874, at Mumbannar, northwest of Heywood in Victoria. She was the daughter of Phoebe (née Ward) and farmer William Pratt, both of whom had migrated from Leicestershire. She was educated at the Mumbannar State School.

== Nursing career ==
Pratt enrolled to train as a nurse at Ballarat Hospital in 1909, understating her age to be accepted. After qualifying she continued to work at Ballarat Hospital, before moving to Melbourne to the Women's Hospital.

Pratt enlisted in the Australian Imperial Force for service with the Australian Army Nursing Service in May 1915 and was immediately embarked aboard RMS Mooltan to Lemnos to join No. 3 Australian General Hospital (3AGH) and nurse soldiers wounded at Gallipoli. She subsequently served with 3AGH in Abbassia, Egypt, before transferring to No. 1 Australian General Hospital in England.

Pratt was posted to the 1st Australian Casualty Clearing Station (1ACCS) at Bailleul in France in May 1917. Two months later, during an air raid in the early hours of 4 July, she was wounded but continued to tend her patients. When she eventually collapsed, it was discovered that shrapnel had lodged in her lungs. She was promoted to sister on 5 July, stabilised and sent to England for treatment. An operation failed to remove the shrapnel but she recovered to resume service at postings in England. For her bravery during the raid, Pratt was awarded the Military Medal. She was one of only seven Australian nurses to receive the Military Medal in the First World War. She was presented with her award by King George V at Buckingham Palace in October 1917, the citation for the medal praising her "conspicuous gallantry displayed in the performance of her duties on the occasion of hostile air raids on Casualty Clearing Stations in the field".

After the war, Pratt and her sister opened St Margaret's Hospital, a private hospital in Malvern, Victoria. In 1937 she attended the coronation of George VI in London.

Her post-war life was badly affected. Not only did she suffer chronic bronchitis from her wounded lung, but she was also afflicted by severe mental illness. Pratt died at Heidelberg Repatriation Hospital on 23 March 1954.
