= Beatrice Isabel Jones =

British nurse

Matron-in-Chief Beatrice Isabel Jones CBE RRC*
- Born: 21 September 1866; Wallasey, Cheshire, England
- Died: 14 January 1921 (aged 54); Baghdad, Mesopotamia (now Iraq)
- Military career
- Allegiance: United Kingdom
- Branch: British Army
- Service years: 1900–1921
- Rank: Matron-in-Chief
- Commands: Mesopotamia Section, Queen Alexandra's Imperial Military Nursing Service
- Conflicts: Second Boer War; First World War
- Awards: Commander of the Order of the British Empire; Royal Red Cross & Bar; Mentioned in Despatches (3); Florence Nightingale Medal

Beatrice Isabel Jones, CBE, RRC & Bar (21 September 1866 – 14 January 1921) was a British nurse who, after serving in several civilian hospitals, volunteered for military service. She served in the Second Boer War in South Africa and then later served during the First World War in Baghdad as matron-in-chief of Mesopotamia. She was one of the inaugural recipients of the Florence Nightingale Medal.

== Early life ==
Beatrice Isabel Jones was born on 21 September 1866 to Alicia and William Bolton Jones of Wallasey in Cheshire (now Merseyside), England. After completing her education at Wallasey High School, she began nursing training at St. Bartholomew's Hospital in London in 1891. After a three-year course of study, she completed her training.

== Nursing career ==
In 1894, Jones began working at St. Barts, holding various positions until 1896 when she took a position as the Assistant Matron of the New General Hospital in Birmingham. Jones left the infirmary in 1897 when she was appointed matron of Victoria Park Hospital in London. In January 1900, she joined Princess Christian's Army Nursing Service Reserve and the following month was called for service in the Second Boer War. She served in General Hospital No. 1 at Wynberg, No. 2 of Pretoria and finally No. 5 at Wynberg, before she returned to Britain and her post as matron at Victoria Park in November. When Queen Alexandra's Imperial Military Nursing Service (QAIMNS) was established in 1902, Jones applied and was appointed as a matron in 1903.

Soon thereafter, Jones began working as Matron of the Royal Herbert Hospital, at Woolwich. but resigned after only a few months. While she was working there, she was awarded the gold badge of the QAIMNS by Queen Alexandra and then in a ceremony in the yard, all members of the Royal Army Medical Corps who had served in the Boer War were issued the Queen's South Africa Medal. In spite of having tendered her resignation in 1903, Jones had returned to Herbert in 1904. In April 1905, it was announced that Jones had been appointed as matron for the new hospital to be built in Millbank. Though the Queen Alexandra Military Hospital construction had not begun, Jones, fifteen nurses and six sisters were hired. The purpose of the hospital was to train nurses to work in other facilities and for the first time, before nurses could be eligible to become matrons, they were required to pass a nursing examination.

In 1913, Jones was awarded the decoration of the Royal Red Cross by the King George V. Jones led 250 nurses to organise the first hospital for British troops in Mesopotamia in 1916. As chief matron of Mesopotamia, she also established hospitals in Basra and Mosul, ensuring that they were organised according to her exacting standards. In 1918, she was awarded a Bar for her Royal Red Cross, and the following year was awarded for her work in Mesopotamia with appointment as a Commander of the Order of the British Empire. In 1920, Jones was one of the inaugural recipients of the Florence Nightingale Medal, which had been established to recognise nursing excellence.

Jones left Mesopotamia briefly in 1920 and then returned to serve as Chief of Civil Administration in Baghdad until her death there on 14 January 1921. She was buried in Baghdad (North Gate) Cemetery, and was the only woman buried among the 4,555 war casualties. A memorial tablet was dedicated to Jones as the first Matron of Queen Alexandra's Military Hospital by Queen Alexandra in 1922, during a ceremony to honour all of the women of the QAIMNS who had lost their lives during the First World War. The Imperial Military Nurses Memorial was in the hospital chapel, with a separate memorial for Jones. The entire memorial was later installed at All Saints Royal Garrison Church in Aldershot Garrison, including the plaque stating that Jones was first matron of the Hospital there, when the Queen Alexandra's Military Hospital was decommissioned. In 1989 a re-dedication service was held for the plaques.
