= Sylvie Ngouadakpa =

Nurse and university lecturer from the Central African Republic

- Citizenship: Central African Republic
- Occupation: Director of the Institute for Paramedical Training
- Medical career
- Field: Nursing
- Awards: Florence Nightingale Medal

Sylvie Ngouadakpa is a nurse and university lecturer from the Central African Republic. She is the first woman from the Central African Republic to be awarded the Florence Nightingale Medal.

== Biography ==
In 2011 Ngouadakpa became the first woman from the Central African Republic to be awarded the Florence Nightingale Medal. In her acceptance speech she dedicated the award to all the nurses of the CAR. She is Director of the University Institute of Paramedical Training (IUMP), based at the Central African Red Cross in collaboration with the University of Bangui. She was previously head of the Association of Nurses of Midwives of the Central African Republic (ANISCA).

Ngouadakpa is married and has seven children.
