= Martha M. Russell =

American nurse

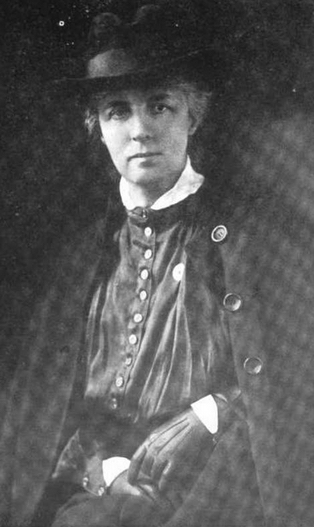
- Martha M. Russell, from a 1921 publication.
- Born: Martha Montague Russell; September 28, 1867; Pittsfield, Massachusetts [Berkshire County]
- Died: July 16, 1961 (aged 93); Front Royal, Virginia [Warren County]
- Citizenship: American
- Education: Mount Holyoke College
- Occupation: nurse
- Known for: American nurse in World War I

Martha Montague Russell (September 28, 1867 – July 16, 1961) was an American nurse in World War I. She was one of the first six American nurses to receive the Florence Nightingale Medal when it was awarded by the International Committee of the Red Cross in 1920.

== Early life ==
Martha Montague Russell was from Pittsfield, Massachusetts. She graduated from Mount Holyoke College, and graduated from training at the New York Hospital School for Nurses in 1894.

== Career ==
Russell was superintendent of nurses at hospitals in Pittsburgh, New York, Louisville, Kentucky, and Providence, Rhode Island. She also worked for a time at the Henry Street Settlement. She was superintendent of nurses at Sloane Maternity Hospital in New York for twelve years before she joined the war work of the American Red Cross.

Russell was a member of the New York Hospital Unit at U. S. Army Base Hospital No. 9. In 1917, she was selected by Jane Delano as Chief Nurse of the American Red Cross Commission in France, to supervise American Red Cross nurses working in France during World War I. She was one of the first six American nurses to receive the Florence Nightingale Medal in 1920.

After the war, Russell was superintendent of University of Colorado Hospital School of Nursing in Boulder, Colorado, and was involved in leadership roles in the National League of Nursing Education. In 1930 she was superintendent of the municipal hospitals in Trenton, New Jersey.

Russell wrote several articles for the American Journal of Nursing, including "Fads: Their Value to Nurses" (1902), "What Social Insurance Will Mean to Nurses" (1917), and "Prevention of Bed Sores" (1930).

== Legacy ==
A loan fund was established in the name of Martha M. Russell by the University of Colorado Nursing School Alumnae Association.
