= Australian Army Nursing Service =

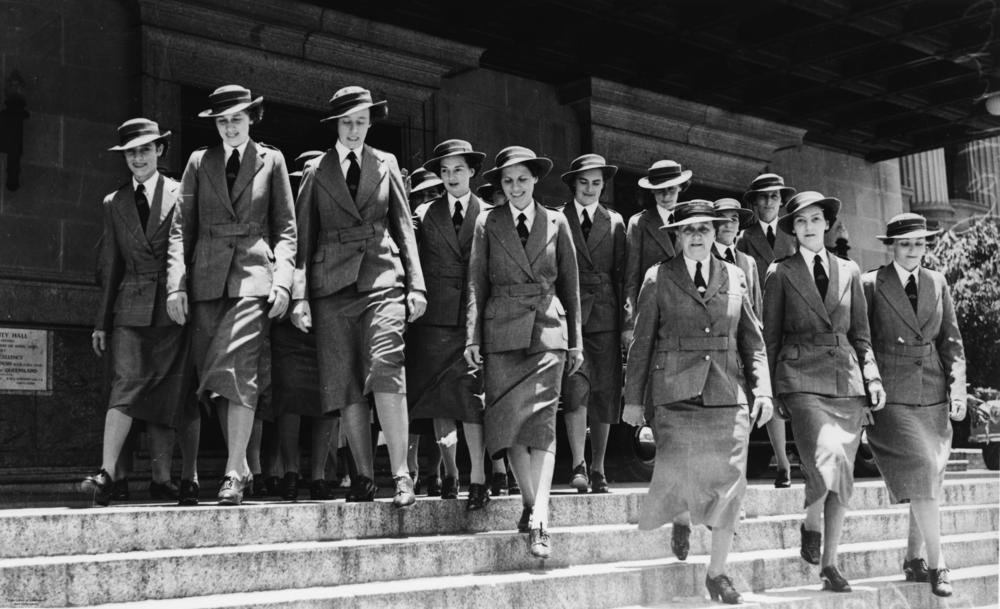
- AANS nurses in Brisbane during 1940
- Active: 1902–1951
- Country: Australia
- Branch: Australian Army
- Type: Medical reserve
- Part of: Australian Army Medical Corps

Commanders
- Notable commanders: Evelyn Conyers (1915–20); Grace Wilson (1925–1940); Annie Sage (1943–51)

The Australian Army Nursing Service (AANS) was an Australian Army Reserve unit which provided a pool of trained civilian nurses who had volunteered for military service during wartime. The AANS was formed in 1902 by amalgamating the nursing services of the colonial-era militaries, and formed part of the Australian Army Medical Corps.

== World War I ==
During World War I, 2861 women joined the AANS AIF for overseas service. To enlist, women had to be between 25 and 40, unmarried and needed to be educated with a minimum of a 3 year qualification. The AANS deployed nurses to many countries such as Belgium, Egypt, England France, Greece and India. They worked in a variety of settings, such as in the Allied hospitals behind the front line, and in Casualty Clearing Stations, which were up close to the front line, as well as on hospital transports such as ships, trains, and barges. Hundreds more served in the AANS AMF on home service in Australia.

When the first 25 nurses, led by Matron Nellie Gould embarked with the Australian Imperial Forces (AIF) in November 1914, they had no military ranks, and the nurses and the AIF were unclear about how the AANS might fit in with the AIF. At the time, the military's senior medical staff were reluctant to enlist women in nursing roles, preferring to train male soldiers as nursing orderlies. Major General Neville Howse, the director of the medical services in the AIF stated:

"The female nurse (as a substitute for the fully trained male nursing orderly) did little toward the actual saving of life in war... although she might promote a more rapid and complete recovery”

Jane Bell had been the Lady Superintendent of the Third Military district, and when the war broke up she was responsible for enlisting the Victorian contingent of the 1st Australian General Hospital (1AGH). She departed Australia in December 1914 as the Principal Matron on the hospital ship Kyarra. She put pressure on the Army Medical Service to clarify the roles of the AANS staff, and allow them autonomy over the control and discipline of their own members. She had a number of serious disagreements regarding the control of the nurses with the commanding officer of the 1AGH, Lieutenant-Colonel William Ramsay Smith, and the Registrar, James Barrett, an ophthalmologist from Melbourne. In June 1915 she was promoted to Matron Inspectress. In July 1915 she submitted staffing recommendations to Smith which he rejected, so she requested transfer or to be returned to Australia. Both Bell and Smith were recalled to Australia in August 1915. An inquiry into 1AGH was called to the attention of an Inquiry, and the court found that clearer roles and greater AANS autonomy was required.

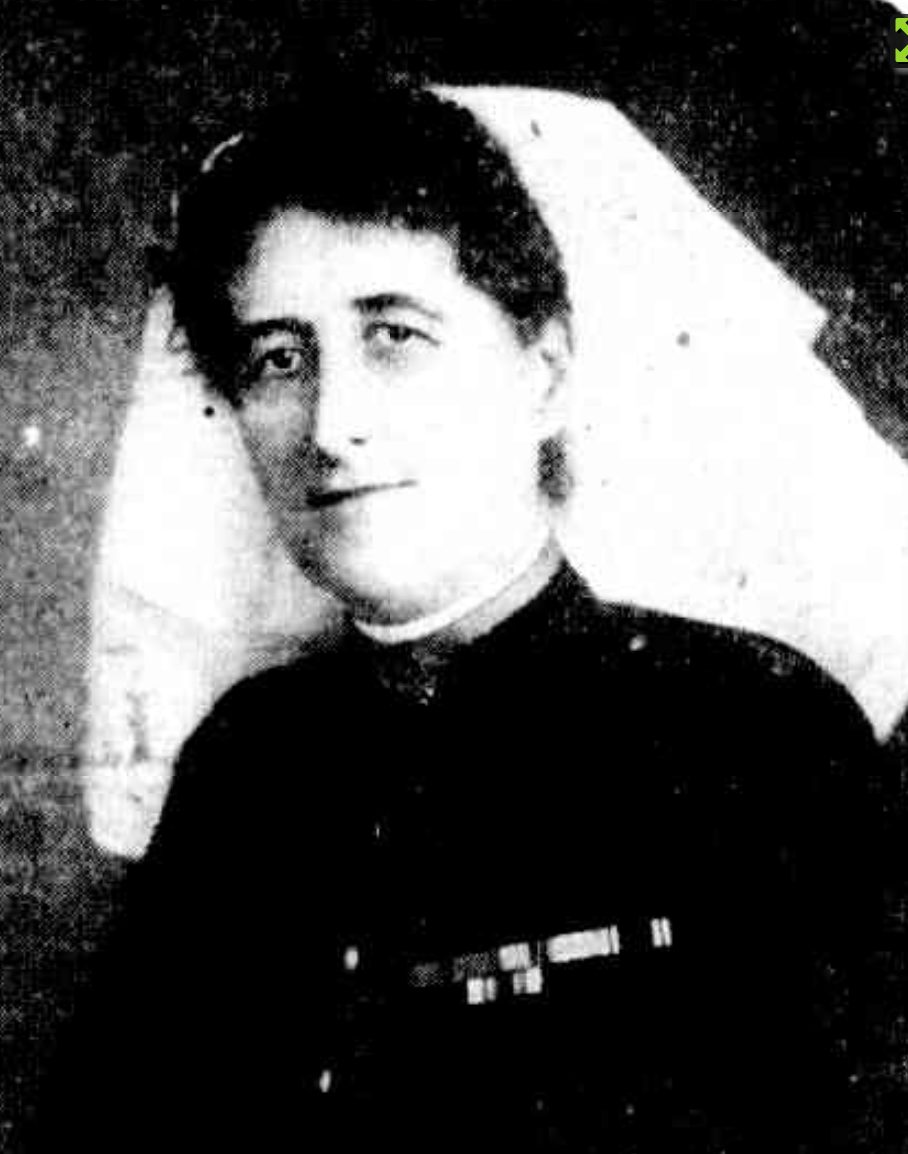
Evelyn Conyers, Matron-in-Chief of the AANS

In early 1916 there was an restructure of the AANS, and the members were given military ranks equivalent to officers. Matrons wore two crowns on their shoulders as Majors did, the Sisters wore two star like the 1st Lieutenants, however, they were still only paid half of what the men received, and often required financial support from their families back at home. At this time, Evelyn Conyers was appointed as the Matron-in-Chief, and was responsible for running the service. Conyers was a New Zealand born nurse who had immigrated to Australia, and had been part of the AANS since its inception in 1903. Conyers was awarded the Royal Red Cross "for conspicuous services rendered" and later a Bar "in recognition of her valuable nursing service". On 1 January 1919 King George V appointed Conyers a Commander of the Order of the British Empire, and in 1921 she was awarded the Florence Nightingale Medal with diploma.

21 AANS nurses died during their war service and a number shortly thereafter. Nurses were present on the Western Front, and in Greece, England, India, Egypt, and Italy. They served not just in Australian military hospitals but also in British hospitals and in ships at sea. The AANS comprised trained nurses, trained masseuses, 14 ward assistants and 1 bacteriologist. After enlisting with the AANS, Fannie Eleanor Williams, a trained nurse, worked as a bacteriologist in laboratories at the No. 3 Australian General Hospital in Lemnos from 1915, the Lister Institute in London from 1917, and the No. 25 British Stationary Hospital in France in 1918. She was awarded the Associate Royal Red Cross for her work.

In 1917, four AANS nurses won the military medal for demonstrating bravery under fire: Sister Dorothy Cawood from Parramatta, New South Wales; Sister Clare Deacon from Burnie, Tasmania; Staff Nurse Mary Jane Derrer from Mackay, Queensland; and Staff Nurse Alice Ross-King from Ballarat, Victoria, who was also awarded an Associate Royal Red Cross in 1918. They were working on the Western Front, at the 2nd Australian Casualty Clearing Station which was near the trenches at Trois Arbres near Armentières when on 22 July 1917, there was a German raid and five bombs hit the hospital. The four nurses rescued patients who were trapped in the burning building.

Pearl Corkhill (1887-1985) nurse, who was awarded a Military Medal for showing courage when attending to wounded during an enemy air-raid. Rachael Pratt (1874–1954) a nurse who was awarded the Military Medal for courage under fire. Alicia Mary Kelly (1874–1942) Irish born, Australian nurse who won the Military Medal for gallantry under fire, and the Royal Red Cross, 2nd class (A.R.R.C.).

After WWI, the AANS reverted to a Reserve.

== World War II ==
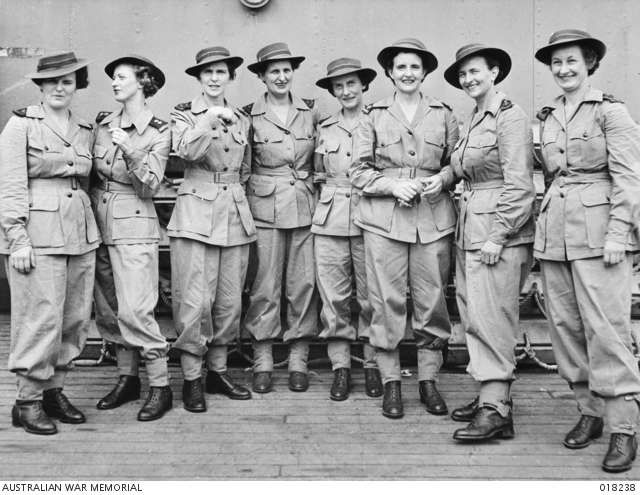
First nursing sisters of the Australian Army Nursing Service (AANS) to arrive in New Britain

The AANS was mobilised again during World War II, and many of its members served overseas. By this time, the Australian Imperial Forces had developed additional women's army auxiliary services in addition to the AANS: The Women's Auxiliary Australian Air Force; The Women's Royal Australian Naval Service; and the Australian Women's Army Service. Additionally new nursing services were also created, including the Royal Australian Air Force Nursing Service and the Royal Australian Naval Nursing Service, as well as the Australian Army Medical Women's Service which provided nursing assistance to the army nurses. With all these opportunities nearly 36,000 women enlisted during World War II, and of those, 3,500 served in the AANS, in general hospitals and clearing stations. The women in the AANS had the most casualties of all the auxiliary services, with 72 deaths. These were due to the ships they were on being torpedoed, or dying as prisoners of war.

Following the war several AANS nurses were posted to Japan as part of the British Commonwealth Occupation Force.

== Post World War II ==
The service was renamed the Royal Australian Army Nursing Service (RAANS) in November 1948 and became part of the regular Army the next year. In 1951 the RAANS achieved corps status, and became the Royal Australian Army Nursing Corps.

== See also ==
- Women in the Australian military
- Royal Australian Air Force Nursing Service
- The Other ANZACs, a history book by Peter Rees
- ANZAC Girls, 6-part miniseries based on the book
