= Australian Army Medical Women's Service =

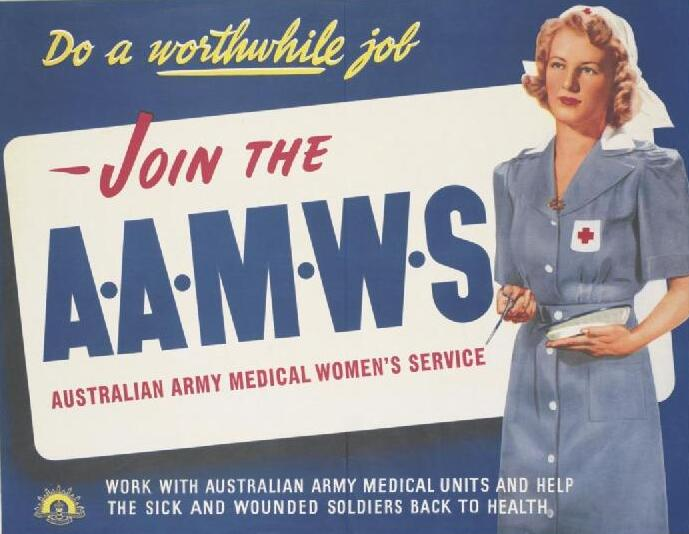
AAMWS recruitment poster

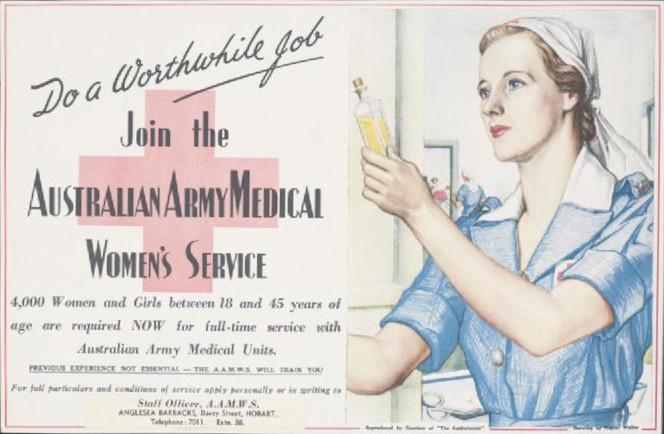
AAMWS poster

The Australian Army Medical Women's Service (AAMWS) was an armed services organisation which existed from 1942 until 1951.

Growing out of the St John Ambulance Voluntary Aid Detachments, it was formed in December 1942 and its members served as nurses in military hospitals in the Middle East, Australia and, with the British Commonwealth Occupation Force, in Japan. In 1951, the AAMWS was merged into the Royal Australian Army Nursing Corps.

== Notable members ==
- Alice Ross-King, described as Australia's most decorated woman, served during World War II
- Camilla Wedgwood, noted anthropologist, served from 1944 to 1946
