= Dorothy Cawood =

Australian civilian and WWI military nurse (1884 – 1962)

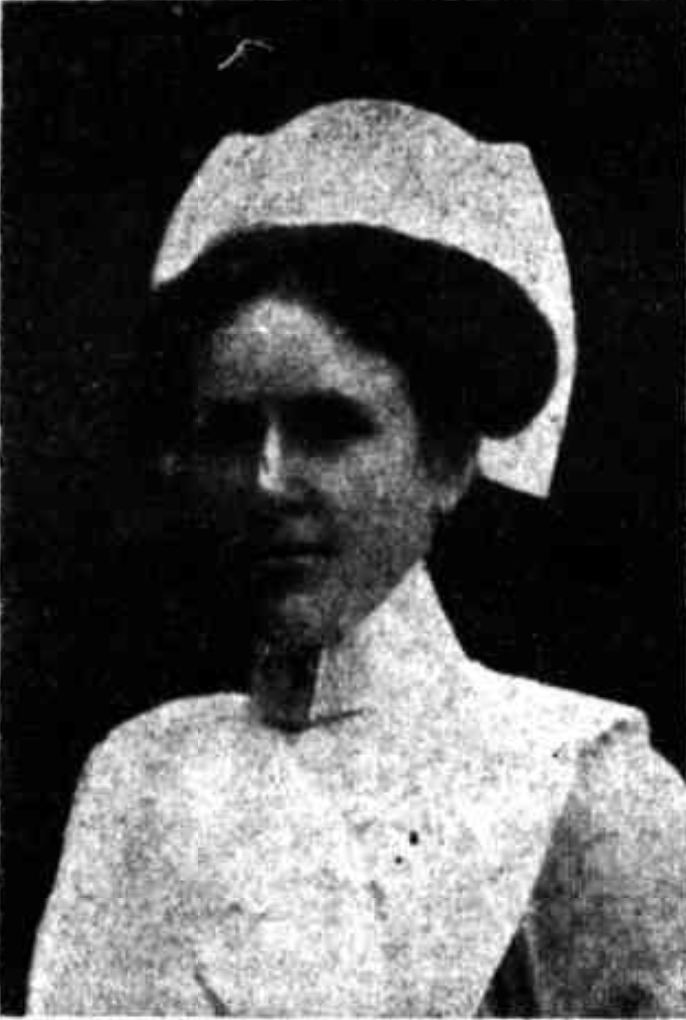
- Sister Dorothy Cawood in 1915
- Born: 9 December 1884; Parramatta, New South Wales
- Died: 16 February 1962 (aged 77); Parramatta, New South Wales
- Burial place: Rookwood Cemetery, New South Wales
- Military career
- Allegiance: Australia
- Branch: Australian Imperial Force
- Service years: 1914–1919
- Rank: Nursing Sister
- Unit: Australian Army Nursing Service
- Conflicts: First World War
- Awards: Military Medal; Mentioned in Despatches

Dorothy Gwendolen Cawood, MM (9 December 1884 – 16 February 1962) was an Australian civilian and military nurse. She was one of the first three members of the Australian Army Nursing Service (AANS) to be awarded the Military Medal in the First World War.

== Early life and training ==
Cawood was born on 9 December 1884 in Parramatta, New South Wales, to John and Sarah Travis (née Garnet) Cawood. Her father was a carpenter and long-time member of the Parramatta Volunteer Rifles. After school, Cawood trained as a nurse at the Coast Hospital, Little Bay, and worked there until her enlistment. She became a registered nurse with the Australasian Trained Nurses' Association on 14 May 1913.

== First World War ==
Cawood volunteered as a staff nurse for the Australian Army Nursing Service (AANS) on 14 November 1914. Two weeks later she left Sydney on the hospital ship HMAT A.55 Kyarra as a member of the No. 2 Australian General Hospital, bound for Egypt. She was promoted to nursing sister in 1915 while serving on a hospital ship and transports.

On 28 September 1917, Cawood was awarded the Military Medal "for bravery in the Field". She was one of only seven nurses in the AANS to receive that honour in the First World War.

Cawood was further honoured by being mentioned in the despatch of Sir Douglas Haig on 7 November 1917 "for distinguished and gallant service between the period Feby 26 M/N to September 26 M/N 1917". She remained on service in Italy after the declaration of peace until early 1919, when she was transferred to England. Cawood left Devonport, England, for Australia in May 1919 on Sudan arriving on 3 July. She was officially discharged on 1 September 1919.

== Post-war career ==
On her return to Sydney, Cawood took a position nursing at the Liverpool State Hospital and Asylum. In November 1922 she was appointed sub-matron (on six months' probation) of the same hospital, with her appointment confirmed in June 1923. She was promoted matron of the David Berry Hospital, Berry, in September 1925, where she worked until her retirement in 1943.

Cawood died in Parramatta on 16 February 1962 and was buried at Rookwood cemetery. She never married.
