= Royal Australian Army Nursing Corps =

Administrative corps of the Australian Army

- Badge
- Active: 1 July 1903 – present
- Country: Australia
- Branch: Australian Army
- Type: Corps
- Motto(s): Pro Humanitate (For Humanity)

The Royal Australian Army Nursing Corps (RAANC) is an Administrative Corps of the Australian Army. It was formed in February 1951 from the Royal Australian Army Nursing Service. A Corps Badge was introduced in 1951 with the motto Pro Humanitate (for Humanity). It embraces the values of compassion and service to others, reflecting the care and dedication provided to the wounded and sick. Approval for the Corps flag was granted on 7 February 1958.

== History ==
=== Foundation ===
The history of RAANC can be traced back to the formation of the Australian Army Nursing Service on 13 August 1898 in New South Wales. At the time it was made up of one Lady Superintendent and 24 nurses. The service saw its first action in the Boer war, when the New South Wales and Victorian governments arranged for a detachment of nurses to deploy with their troops to Africa. Groups and individual nurses from Western Australia, South Australia and Queensland also served in the Anglo-Boer War. Due to the performance of the nurses in that conflict, an order was given in 1902 for the formation of the Australian Army Nursing Service under the control of the federal government. It is this order's promulgation, 1 July 1903, which is celebrated as RAANC Corps day.

=== First World War ===
More than 2000 - and some say up to 2286 - AANS female nurses served overseas in the World War I with 423 serving in Australia, together with 130 Australians who had enlisted with the AANS but were transferred to work with Queen Alexandra's Imperial Military Nursing Service Reserve. 21 AANS died on service together with 2 from the QAIMNSR and at least 388 were decorated. In addition, more than 400 nurses served solely in Australia as part of the AANS Home Service.

=== Second World War ===
In World War II, more than 3580 women joined the AANS with 71 members losing their lives (23 in battle and 18 as a result of accident or illness). Thirty-eight nurses became prisoners of war. A total of 137 decorations were awarded to members of the AANS, including two George Medals. In 1945, Princess Alice, Duchess of Gloucester, became the Honorary Colonel Princess Alice, Duchess of Gloucester, and in 1948 the service was renamed as the Royal Australian Army Nursing Service. It became part of the Australian Regular Army the following year, eventually becoming a corps in February 1951 - the Royal Australian Army Nursing Corps.

=== Korean War ===
During the Korean War (25 June 1950 – 27 July 1953), 153 Australian nurses served in Commonwealth hospital units, primarily in Japan but also in Korea. They were members of the Royal Australian Air Force Nursing Service and the Royal Australian Army Nursing Service. These nurses provided care for battle casualties, dealt with health problems (many emanating from the extreme cold), and assisted with the transportation of patients, including evacuating the wounded from Korea to Japan or Australia.

== Alliances ==
- United Kingdom – Royal Army Medical Service

== Order of precedence ==
Preceded by Australian Army Band Corps	Australian Army Order of Precedence	Succeeded by None

== See also ==
- Women in the Australian military
- Women in Australia
- Royal Australian Army Medical Corps
