= Florence Nightingale Medal =

International award for nursing

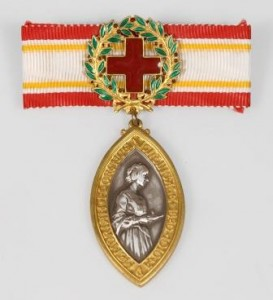
- Obverse of the medal
- Type: International nursing decoration (both military and civilian)
- Awarded for: "Exceptional courage and devotion to the wounded, sick or disabled or to civilian victims of a conflict or disaster" or "exemplary services or a creative and pioneering spirit in the areas of public health or nursing education"
- Description: Gold and silver medallion with the inscription 'Ad memoriam Florence Nightingale 1820–1910' suspended from a red cross encircled by green laurel
- Presented by: Heads of State or Heads of Red Cross National Societies
- Post-nominals: FNM
- Status: Currently awarded
- Established: 1912
- First award: 1920

Highlights
- Total awarded posthumously: 7
- Total recipients: 1,615
- Ribbon bar of the medal

The Florence Nightingale Medal is an international award presented to those distinguished in nursing and named after British nurse Florence Nightingale. The medal was established in 1912 by the International Committee of the Red Cross (ICRC), following the Eighth International Conference of Red Cross Societies in London in 1907. It is the highest international distinction a nurse can achieve and is awarded to nurses or nursing aides for "exceptional courage and devotion to the wounded, sick or disabled or to civilian victims of a conflict or disaster" or "exemplary services or a creative and pioneering spirit in the areas of public health or nursing education". The Florence Nightingale Medal Commission comprises several members and staff of the ICRC, several of whom are nursing professionals, and the head nurse of the International Federation of Red Cross and Red Crescent Societies. A representative of the International Council of Nurses also participates in the work of the commission.

== History ==
The medal was initially set up to be awarded to six nurses annually, although the first 42 awards were only made in 1920 due to the disruption of the First World War. The first recipients came from Great Britain (including the then British Empire), Austria, Belgium Czechoslovakia, Denmark, France, Greece, Hungary, Italy, Japan, Romania and the United States. Included in the nine nurses from Great Britain and the then British Empire were: Beatrice Isabel Jones, Margaret MacDonald, and Hester Maclean. The six American nurses were: Florence Merriam Johnson, Helen Scott Hay, Linda K. Meirs, Martha M. Russell, Mary E. Gladwin, and Alma E. Foerster, and three German nurses including Elsbeth von Keudell. Ida F. Butler was the fifteenth American recipient of the award in 1937. In 1983, Wang Xiuying became the first Chinese recipient of the medal.

The medal was restricted to female nurses until regulation changes in 1991. Under the new regulations, it is open to both women and men and is awarded every two years to a maximum number of fifty recipients worldwide.

== Medal description ==
The vesica piscis-shaped medal is composed of gold and silver-gilt and bears a portrait of Florence Nightingale surrounded by the words "Ad memoriam Florence Nightingale 1820–1910". On the reverse, the name of the recipient and the date of the award is engraved, surrounded by the inscription "Pro vera misericordia et cara humanitate perennis décor universalis" ("true and loving humanitarianism – a lasting general propriety"). The medal is attached to a white and red ribbon by a clasp featuring a red enamel cross encircled by a green laurel crown. Recipients are also presented with a parchment diploma of the award and, from 1927, a miniature version of the medal that could be more easily worn. The medal and a diploma are usually presented by the head of state at a ceremony in their own country, which is required to have "a formal character, in keeping with the founders' wishes".

== Sets of medals ==
In 2007, the 41st set of medals was awarded to 35 recipients from 18 countries.

In 2009, the 42nd set of medals was awarded to 28 recipients from 15 countries, including one for the first time to a nurse in Afghanistan, Sister Anisa.

In 2011, the 43rd set of medals was awarded to 39 recipients from 19 countries, including for the first time to two Kenyan nurses, as well as to the first recipient from the Central African Republic - Sylvie Ngouadakpa.

In 2013, the 44th set of medals was awarded to 32 recipients from 16 countries, including one posthumously to Khalil Dale MBE, a delegate from the British Red Cross.

In 2015, the 45th set of medals was awarded to 36 recipients from 18 countries, including one posthumously to a Sierra Leonian nurse, Mr Morison Musa, who had worked in an Ebola treatment centre.

In 2017, the 46th set of medals was awarded to 39 recipients from 22 countries, including one to Rear Admiral Sylvia Trent-Adams, the Acting Surgeon General of the United States. Roselyn Nugba-Ballah was the first ever Liberian recipient of the medal, due to her work in the Ebola epidemic.

In 2019, the 48th set of medals was awarded to 29 nurses from 19 countries, including one to Captain Felicity Gapes, a New Zealand Red Cross nurse.

In 2021, the 49th set of medals was awarded to 25 nurses from 18 countries, including two posthumously to: Bernadette Gleeson, an Australian nurse, and Arasta Bakhishova, an Azerbaijani nurse.

In 2023, the 50th set of medals was awarded to 37 nurses from 22 countries, including three posthumously to: Meggist Menil Abetew, and Amidekrose Aregaw Gebiru, both Ethiopian ambulance drivers who were shot dead in the Tigray region; Margita Kosturiková, a Slovak nurse. In 2023, Wilbroad William Rwenyagira became the first Tanzanian awardee of this medal.

In 2025, the 51st set of medals was awarded to 35 nurses from 17 countries.

The ICRC Library's research guide on the Funds and Medals of the International Red Cross and Red Crescent Movement provides online access to the complete list of Florence Nightingale Medal recipients, as well as circulars of attribution, regulations, and related reports.
