= Australian women in World War I =

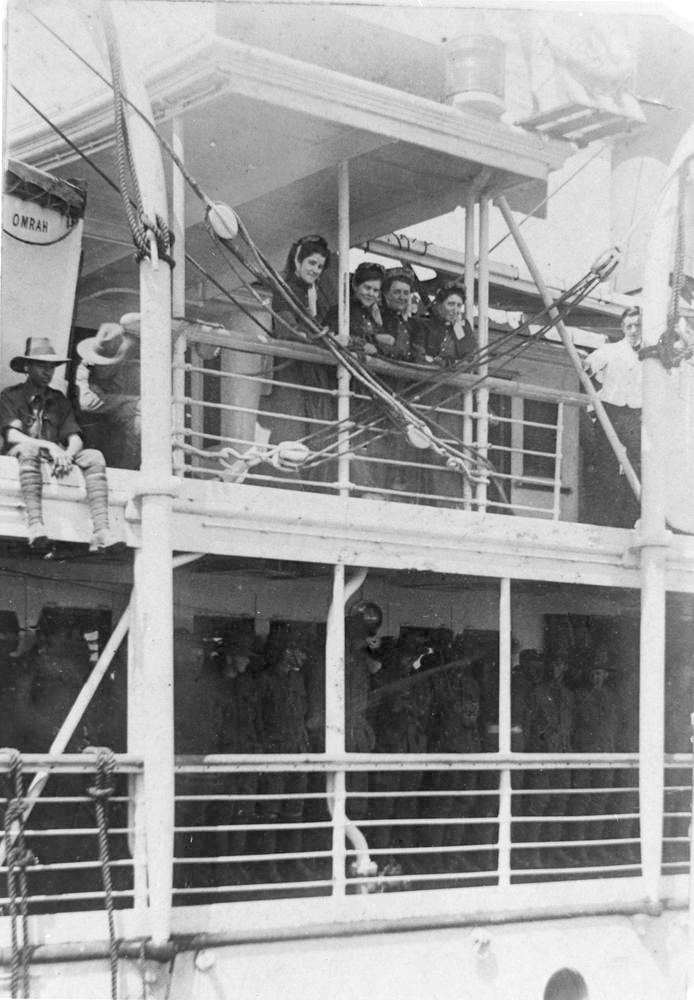
Queensland nurses leaving on the SS Omrah for World War I, circa 1914

Australian women in World War I, were involved in militaries, and auxiliary organisations of the Allied forces abroad, and in administration, fundraising, campaigning, and other war time efforts on home front in Australia. They also played a role in the anti-war movement, protesting conscription, as well as food shortages driven by war activities. The role of women in Australian society was already shifting when the war broke out, yet their participation on all fronts during the Great War escalated these changes significantly.

The Australian Imperial Force (AIF) restricted women's enlistment to participation in the Australian Army Nursing Service (AANS), accepting only single women with professional nursing degrees, as well as a group of trained masseuses, 14 ward assistants and one bacteriologist. Initially the union of the AANS into the AIF was unclear and disorganized, with the nurses having no official rank. Tensions between the organisations resulted in principal matron Jane Bell of the AANS, and Lieutenant-Colonel William Ramsay Smith of the AIF being recalled from duty. A subsequent enquiry into the feud resulted in the AANS receiving official recognition and officer rankings, with Evelyn Conyers leading the AANS as Matron-in-Chief for the duration of the war. Many nurses were decorated with military honours such as the Royal Red Cross, and seven nurses received the Military Medal for demonstrating bravery under fire.

Women doctors were told they would not be accepted into the Australian, or British militaries, and likewise there were no roles for women as cooks, orderlies, ambulance drivers, or any other role. However, many women who were determined to serve found their own way abroad, and participated through auxiliary organisations such as Red Cross organisations, and the Scottish Women's Hospitals for Foreign Service, or simply created their own opportunities by establishing hospital units, such as Rachel Ward's, Australian Voluntary Hospital, and Helen Sexton's Hôpital Australien de Paris, or by establishing canteens for soldiers in Cairo as Alice Chisholm did. Some Australian women were also able to enlist in the French and eventually the British militaries. The most senior Australian woman in military service during the war was Maud McCarthy, the British Expeditionary Force Matron-in-Chief for France and Flanders.

Australian women also played a significant role on the Australian home front. Led by Lady Helen Munro Ferguson, Australian women played a fundamental role in establishing the Australian branch of the British Red Cross, just a few days after the outbreak of the war. This organisation became the Australian Red Cross. Women undertook fundraising and recruiting activities as well as organising comfort packages for soldiers serving overseas. Other women also filled jobs made vacant by men joining the armed forces.

Anti-war movements and campaigns were established by Australian women including the Women's Peace Army led by Vida Goldstein. Women were actively involved in campaigning on both sides of the debate on conscription, leading to events such as the Conscription disturbance at the Brisbane School of Arts which saw public conflict between the Women's Compulsory Service Petition League and the Brisbane branch of the Women's Peace army, led by Margaret Thorp. Anti-war protests led to some women, such as Adela Pankhurst being arrested for public disturbance.

Nevertheless, despite this involvement, women have never occupied a central position in the Australian version of the Anzac legend, although since the 1970s their role has been examined in more detail as a result of the emergence of feminist historiography, and specialist histories such as the history of nursing.

== Australian societal context ==
With the British colonisation, Australian society became firmly patriarchal. Men held dominant positions in society, professional professions, and politics, as well as in families, having legal right of ownership over all household income, property, and children. Women were expected to marry young, as being a mother and wife was the only accepted career for women.

However, in the decades leading up to World War I, Australian society had been changing, with women fighting for, and gaining more rights. So, while Australian women were still subjected to segregation in public life, with limited freedom and autonomy, they had gained the right to inherit property, earn wages, and vote, and were increasingly making their way into professions previously reserved for men.

The war brought further changes to women’s place in society. While there were limited options for women who wished to take part in the war effort directly, with so many men joining the overseas taking part in the war effort, women were provided the opportunities to step into roles that were previously reserved for men both in the home, and in wider society. Women filled employment roles, including as doctors, journalists, and architects. However, while there were limits to direct military participation in the war effort, there were some roles for professional nurses in the military. Additionally, there were other women who either did not meet the eligibility for joining the military as a nurse, or who wished to participate as doctors, administrators, ambulance drivers, orderlies, or cooks, who funded their own travel to Europe and found alternative opportunities to take part.

== The outbreak of war ==
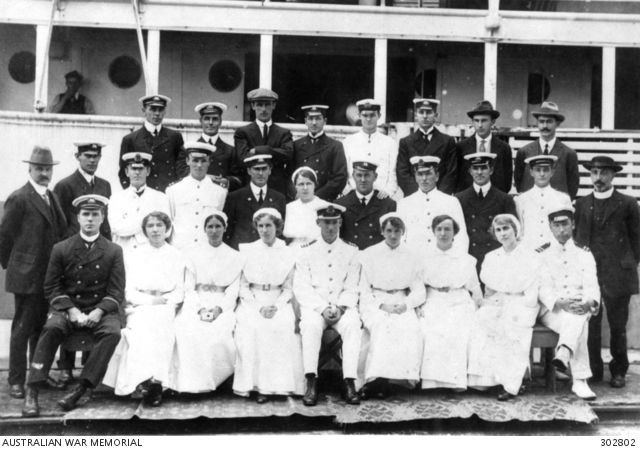
Group portrait of the medical staff from the Australian hospital ship HMAS Grantala

When the war broke out between Britain and Germany in August 1914, Australia, as a dominion of Britain, was also at war and pledged full support. The government began recruiting for their military, and had strict enlistment requirements, only accepting the fittest men of military age (19 to 38 years of age). Australia's first significant contribution to the war at this time was to disrupt the German outposts in the Pacific with a small, quickly assembled military unit called the Australian Naval and Military Expeditionary Force. They focussed first on disrupting wireless communication lines for Germany’s most powerful fleet in the region, the East Asiatic Squadron. Australia's first hospital ship, HMAS Grantala, departed Sydney on 30 August 1914, and supported the expeditions in Rabaul, and later in Suva. On board were 60 medical staff including Matron Sarah Melanie De Mestre, who was in command of six nursing sisters, Florence Elizabeth McMillan, Stella Lillian Colless, Rachel Clouston, Constance Margaret Neale, Bertha Ellen Burtinshaw, and Rosa Angela Kirkcaldie, all of whom were recruited from the Royal Prince Alfred Hospital. These seven nurses were the first women enlisted in the Royal Australian Navy. The ship returned to Australian on 22 December 1914 and the staff were demobilised. The first of the Australian Army Nursing Service (AANS) had already been deployed by this time, and it was not yet clear whether more AANS nurses would be deployed. So, impatient to rejoin the war effort, Kirkcaldie travelled to England at her own expense to join the Queen Alexandra's Imperial Military Nursing Service (QAIMNS). Burtinshaw would not return to military service as she married, making her ineligible for enlisting with the military. The five other nurses, De Mestre, McMillan, Colless, Clouston, and Neale all eventually enlisted with the Australian Army Nursing Service (AANS).

In the meantime, Australian women at home and abroad who wished to support the war effort began to get involved in other ways.

=== The Australian Voluntary Hospital ===
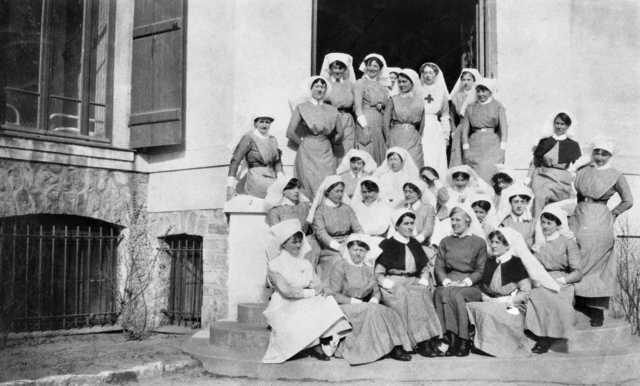
Nursing staff of the Australian Voluntary Hospital. Matron Ida Greaves is at the front, fourth from the left

In August 1914 Rachel Ward, Countess of Dudley, the estranged wife of the former Governor-General of Australia, the Lord Dudley, decided to create a hospital from Australian doctors and nurses who were in the United Kingdom. There were relatively large numbers of Australian doctors and nurses because advanced qualifications required a trip overseas.

Lady Dudley discussed her proposal with King George V, and then with the Secretary of State for War, Lord Kitchener, and the British Army's Director General Army Medical Services, Sir Arthur Sloggett, who authorised the hospital. The hospital was formally offered to the British government by the Australian High Commissioner to the United Kingdom, Sir George Reid on 15 August 1914. Volunteers responded to advertisements that Lady Dudley placed in English newspapers on 17 August 1914. Women doctors were not accepted, but women nurses were welcomed. Ida Greaves, from Royal Newcastle Hospital, was appointed matron. The hospital soon reached a strength of 120 staff, of whom 36 were nurses.

== Military service ==
=== Women doctors ===
At the time war broke out, there were 129 women doctors registered to practice in Australia, and over 1000 women were registered to practice in Britain. However, the primary roles for Australian women during the war was through nursing. No other official military roles were available to Australian women when World War I broke out. Nearly three decades earlier Australian universities started lifting their bans on women enrolling in medicine. In 1891 Laura Hope was the first woman to graduate with a medical degree in Australia, and in 1892 Helen Sexton was the third. Along with surgeon Lilian Cooper who earned her degree in London in 1890, these three doctors each had over 20 years of experience, and yet were not eligible to enlist with the AIF. Agnes Bennett, an Australian doctor living in New Zealand had 15 years' experience as a doctor in Australia, New Zealand and Europe, yet when she applied to Australian and New Zealand militaries and was told by a recruitment officer to "Stay home and knit for the war effort!" In May 1915, a notice was posted in the Sydney Morning Herald under the headline "NO WOMEN DOCTORS", which stated:

The Minister for Defence is in receipt of a cable message from the High Commissioner, Sir George Reid, stating that the War Office regrets that it cannot utilise the service of women doctors.

Doctors, such as Katie Ardill, Eleanor Elizabeth Bourne, and Phoebe Chapple, after being rejected by the Australian military, travelled at their own expense to enlist in other associated organisations taking part in the war effort. There were at least 26 known Australian women doctors who served in the war.

=== Nursing in the Australian military ===
The Australian Army Nursing Service (AANS) comprised more than 3,000 nurses during the war, over 2,200 of whom served outside Australia. Initially the AANS had no military ranks, and the organisation, and the AIF, were unclear about how the AANS might fit in with the AIF. At the time, the military's senior medical staff were reluctant to enlist women in nursing roles, preferring to train male soldiers as nursing orderlies. Major General Neville Howse, the director of the medical services in the AIF stated:

The female nurse (as a substitute for the fully trained male nursing orderly) did little toward the actual saving of life in war... although she might promote a more rapid and complete recovery

Principal Matron of the 1st Australian General Hospital (1AGH), Jane Bell departed Australia in December 1914 and put pressure on the Army Medical Service to clarify the roles of the AANS staff, and allow the AANS autonomy. She had a number of serious disagreements regarding these matters with, Lieutenant-Colonel William Ramsay Smith, and the Registrar, James Barrett, an ophthalmologist from Melbourne. Due to the conflict, both Bell and Smith were recalled to Australia in August 1915. A subsequent inquiry into the matter found that clearer roles and greater AANS autonomy was required.

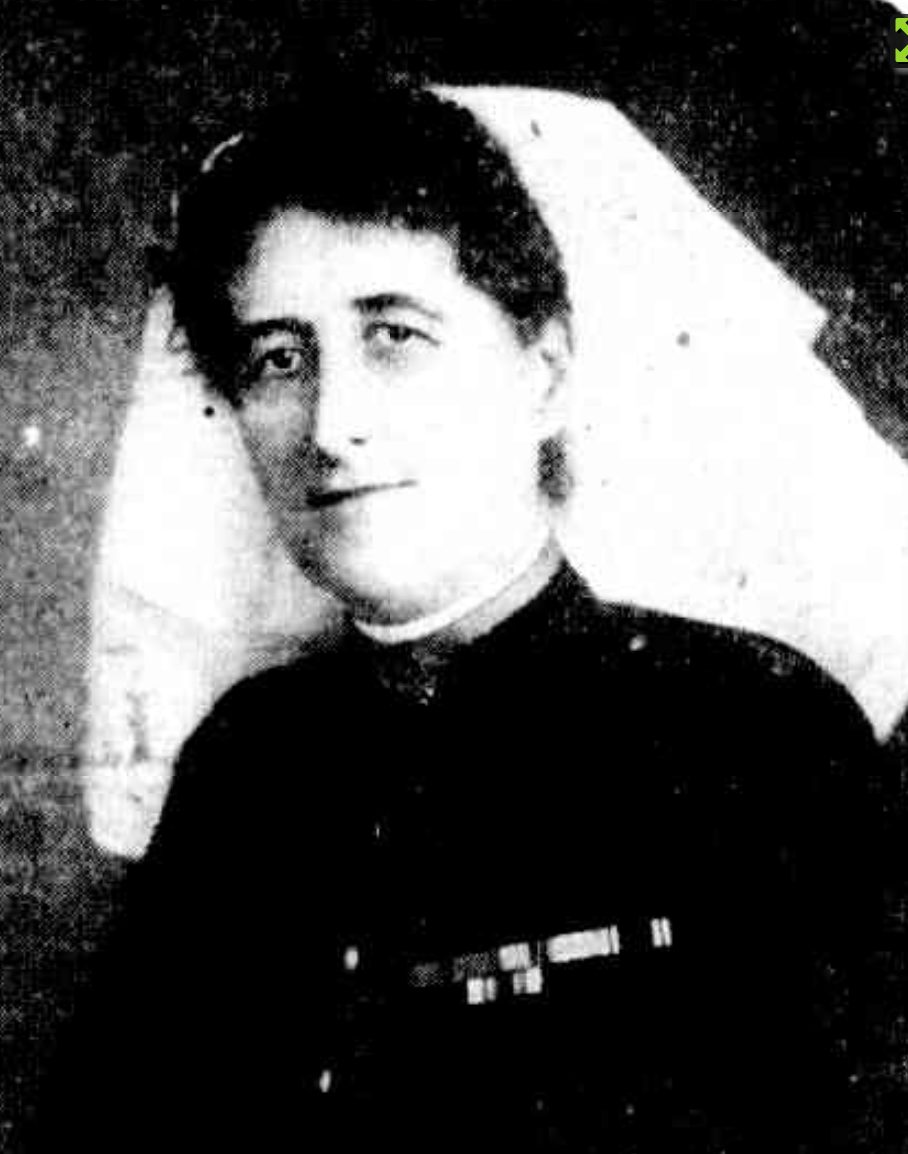
Evelyn Conyers, Matron-in-Chief of the AANS

Evelyn Conyers was appointed as the Matron-in-Chief, and was responsible for running the service. The AANS members were given military ranks equivalent to officers. Matrons wore two crowns on their shoulders as Majors did, the Sisters wore two star like the 1st Lieutenants, however, they were still only paid half of what the men received, and often required financial support from their families back at home.

Nurses were present on the Western Front, and in Greece, England, India, Egypt, and Italy. They served not just in Australian military hospitals but also in British hospitals and in ships at sea. 21 AANS nurses died during their war service and a number shortly thereafter. The AANS comprised trained nurses, trained masseuses, 14 ward assistants and 1 bacteriologist. After enlisting with the AANS, Fannie Eleanor Williams, a trained nurse, worked as a bacteriologist in laboratories at the No. 3 Australian General Hospital in Lemnos from 1915, the Lister Institute in London from 1917, and the No. 25 British Stationary Hospital in France in 1918. She was awarded the Associate Royal Red Cross for her work.

Seven AANS nurses were awarded the Military Medal for demonstrating bravery under fire. Four of these recipients were working on the Western Front, at the 2nd Australian Casualty Clearing Station, which was near the trenches at Trois Arbres near Armentières. On 22 July 1917, there was a German raid and five bombs hit the hospital. The four nurses rescued patients who were trapped in the burning building. These nurses were:

- Sister Dorothy Cawood from Parramatta, New South Wales;
- Sister Clare Deacon from Burnie, Tasmania;
- Staff Nurse Mary Jane Derrer from Mackay, Queensland;
- Staff Nurse Alice Ross-King from Ballarat, Victoria, who was also awarded an Associate Royal Red Cross in 1918.

The other three recipients were:

- Pearl Corkhill for showing courage when attending to wounded during an enemy air-raid.
- Rachael Pratt for displaying courage under fire.
- Alicia Mary Kelly for gallantry under fire. She also received the Royal Red Cross, 2nd class.

=== Service in the British Army Medical Services ===
Australian women were able to serve in the British Army Medical Services.

==== Queen Alexandra's Imperial Military Nursing Service (QAIMNS) ====
The QAIMNS were an elite military nursing service and was part of the British Army. Volunteers had to be between 25 and 25 years old, single and need to be of good social standing. They required three years of hospital training and have a good references. The nurses had officer ranking and were addressed as 'Sister'.

===== Matron-in-Chief of the British Expeditionary Force on the western Front =====
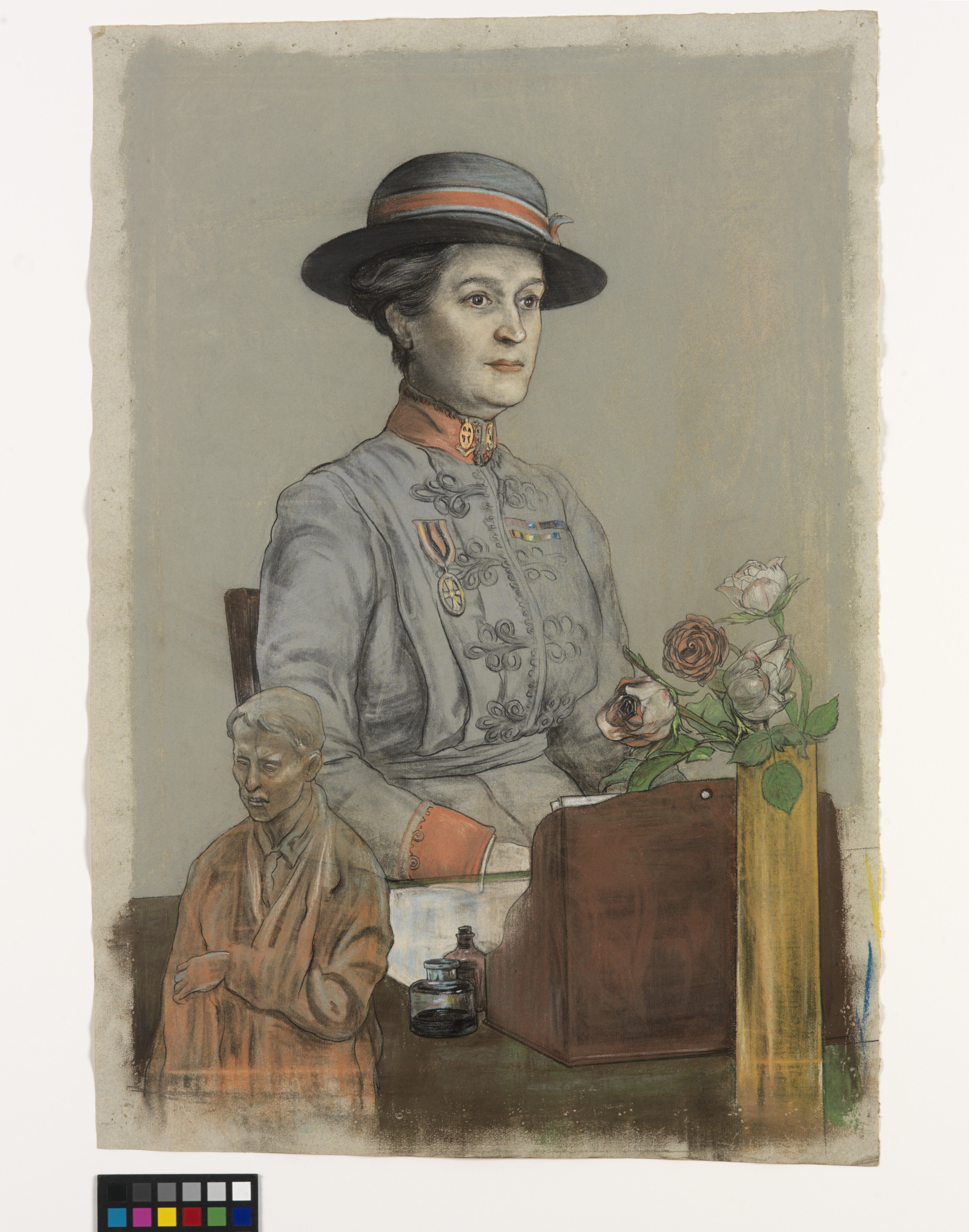
Dame Maud McCarthy, Matron-in-chief, British Expeditionary Forces on the Western Front.

The most senior Australian woman in military service in World War I was Maud McCarthy, the British Expeditionary Force Matron-in-Chief for France and Flanders. McCarthy was born in Paddington, Sydney, and was raised and educated in Australia, and she studied nursing at the University of Sydney. By the time she enlisted to serve in World War I, she had military decorations, having served as one of the then Princess Alexandra's personal military nurses in South Africa, and being involved in the formation of the Queen Alexandra's Imperial Military Nursing Service, and from 1910, she had been the Principle Matron of the War Office. She held this position until World War I broke out, when she sailed on the first British Expeditionary Force ship that left England, and arrived in France on 12 August 1914. Under her command were all the trained nurses and volunteer medical workers on the Western Front, which included the Queen Alexandra's Imperial Military Nursing Service, the Territorial Force Nursing Service, and the nursing detachments connected to the Australian, Canadian, Indian, South African militaries, and after 1917, the United States of America, as well as The Red Cross and the Voluntary Aid Detachments.

McCarthy answered directly to the Matron-in-Chief of the QAIMNS, Ethel Becher, and the Director of General Medical Services. Her role was to manage all aspects of nursing administration, and deployment and training of nurses, throughout the Somme campaign. She was required to manage the nursing across all the military facilities, such as the casualty clearing stations, hospital trains and barges, stationary and base hospitals, and hospital ships. Her headquarters were at Abbeville, however she had to travel across all the medical units of the western front. In the month of July in 1916, she travelled to 18 different hospitals across France and Belgium to review conditions of the patients and the nurses, and the quality of nursing services.

One of the most decorated nurses of World War I, McCarthy received praise for her work, including from one Army general who stated:

She's perfectly splendid, she's wonderful … she's a soldier!… If she was made Quartermaster-General, she'd work it, she'd run the whole Army, and she'd never get flustered, never make a mistake. The woman's a genius'.

On 5 August 1919, McCarthy left France and was seen off by representatives from the French government. For her work in World War I, McCarthy was appointed a Dame Grand Cross of the British Empire (GBE), received a bar to her Royal Red Cross, and was awarded the Florence Nightingale Medal, the French Légion d'honneur and Médaille des Épidémies, and the Belgian Médaille de la Reine-Élisabeth.

===== Aboriginal and Torres Strait Islander women in World War I =====
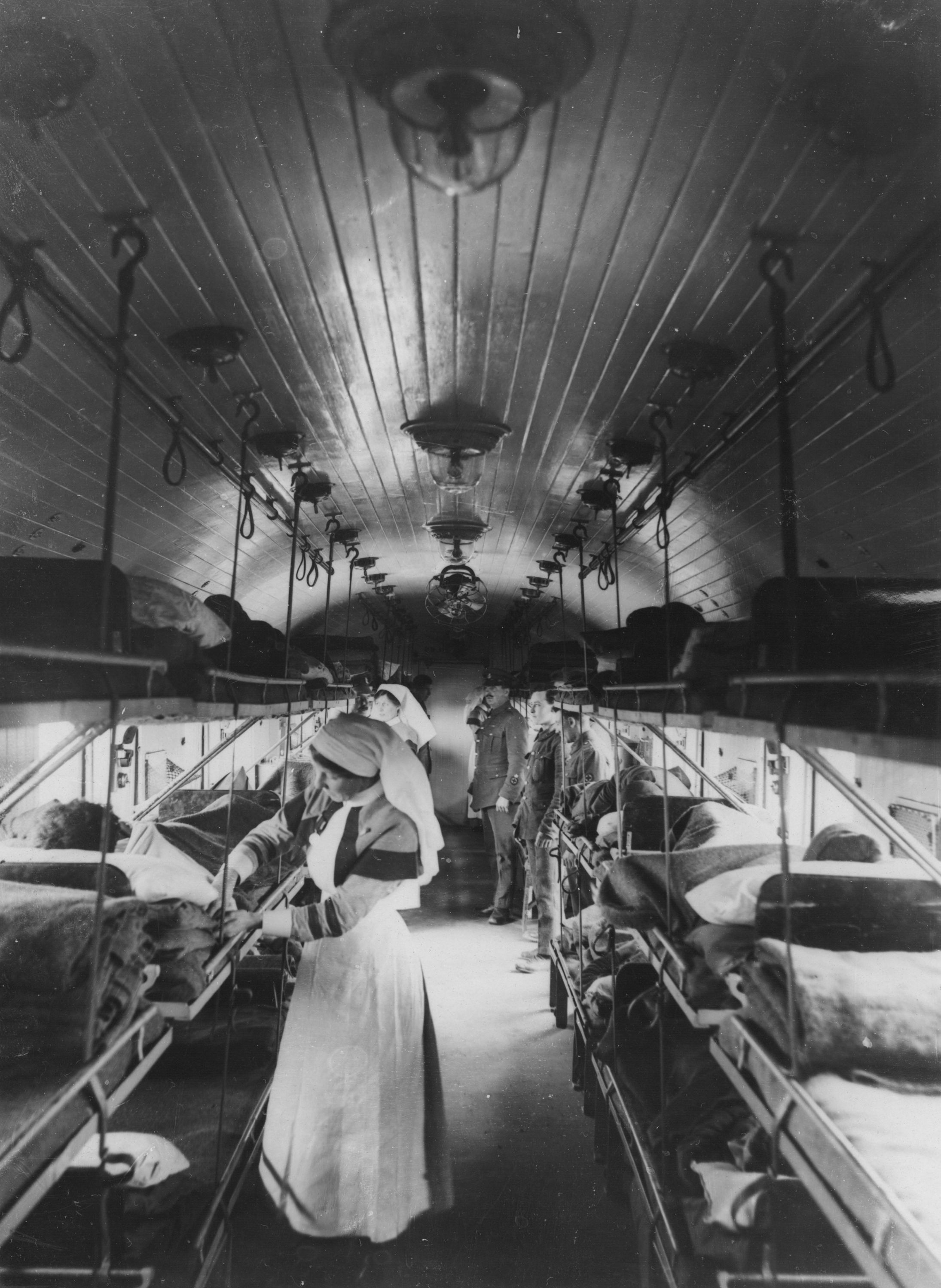
British ambulance train ward

At the time of the outbreak of war, Australia had various protectionist policies which enforced segregation, and controlled the lives of Aboriginal and Torres Strait Islander peoples. These policies restricted where they could live and work, who they could marry, whether they could practice culture, raise their own children, or receive wages. Despite these policies, over 1000 Aboriginal and Torres Strait Islander men are known to have served in World War I by either hiding their identities to enlist early in the war, or by waiting until after 1917 when a military order allowed some Aboriginal men, those the military identified as ‘half caste’ due to having one European parent, to enlist.

Aboriginal women were subject to extra restrictions due to their gender, as the Australian Army only allowed trained nurses, with references to enlist. While Aboriginal women were likely working as nurses in private service, or in hospitals on missions, the aforementioned policies meant there were limited opportunities for them to receive the formal training required to be registered, before the middle of the 20th century. May Yarrowick is an exception, having successfully trained and registered as a midwifery nurse in 1907. However, she did not enlist for service, as she was working as a midwife in regional New South Wales at the time.

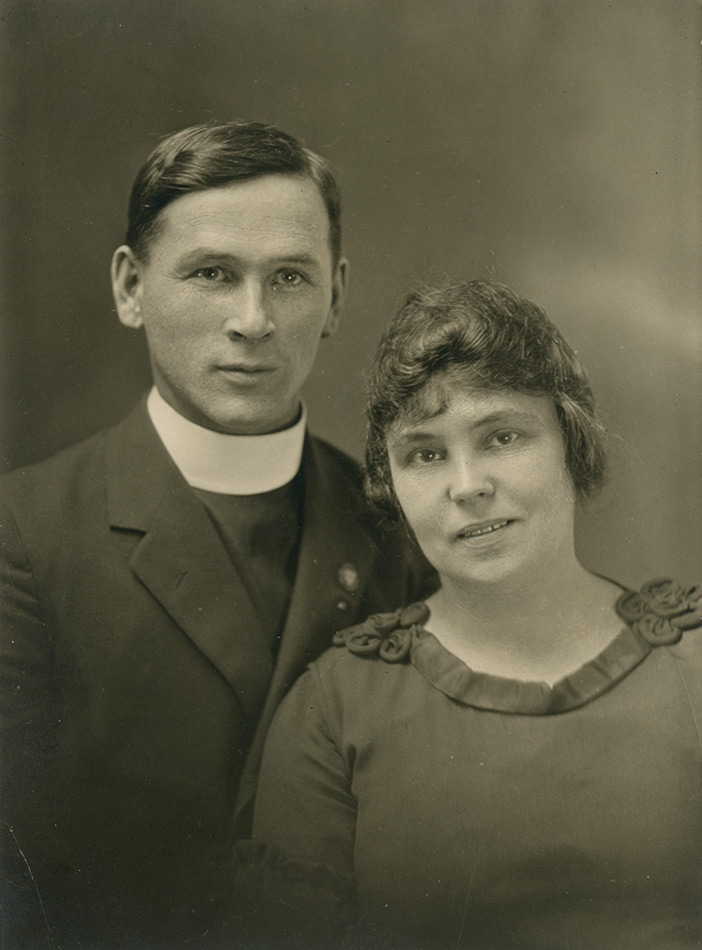
Sister Marion Leane Smith

Marion Leane Smith, a Dharug woman, is the only identified Aboriginal woman to have served in World War I, volunteering with the QAIMNS. Smith was born in Liverpool, New South Wales, and when she was two years old, her parents moved to Canada. This move to Canada meant that she was able to avoid the official and unofficial barriers to nursing that she would have encountered in Australia. Having completed her training in the United States in 1913, and undertaken work in Canada, she then enlisted with the QAIMNS on 7 March 1917, and sailed to France. On 9 December 1917, she was assigned to the No. 41 Ambulance train. The ambulance trains were made up to transport injured soldiers from the casualty clearing stations, back to the base hospitals. Her records from ambulance train state that she was "a very good surgical nurse most attentive to patients." and furthermore:

Staff Nurse Smith has given complete satisfaction in the carrying out of her duties whilst on the train. Her work is both quickly and efficiently done. She is most capable in every way. Power of administration satisfactory as also tact and ability to train others.

Smith served on the ambulance train until September 1918, when she travelled to Italy with the British Italian Expeditionary Force. She then she worked at the University War Hospital in Southampton until the end of the war in 1919, when she returned to Canada.

===== Australians honoured for bravery during service in QAIMNS =====
A number of Australian women in the QAIMNS were awarded medals for bravery.

Alice Alanna Cashin was born in Melbourne, and was raised in Sydney, and completed her nurses training at St Vincent's Hospital in Darlinghurst. When the war broke out, Cashin was already in London having just gained her diploma at the International School of Therapeutic Massage. Instead of returning home, she volunteered at the general hospital at Calais, France. 19 July 1915, she enlisted with the QAIMNS, and was put in charge of a surgical ward, in the general hospital at Ras-el-din in Egypt, for which she was awarded a Royal Red Cross. She was then awarded a bar to the Royal Red Cross for saving wounded soldiers on the HMHS Gloucester Castle when the clearly marked hospital ship was torpedoed by a German U-boat.

Lydia Abell was born in Parramatta in New South Wales, and at first signed up with the French Flag Nursing Corps working at a hospital in Bordeaux. She then moved to the Australian Voluntary Hospital in Wimereux. On 1 July 1916, when the Australian Voluntary Hospital was absorbed into the British army, becoming the No. 32 Stationary Hospital, Abell was officially enlisted with QAIMNS. She also served at the No.14 General Hospital, and a number of Casualty Clearing Stations, and worked on the No.3 and No. 4 Ambulance Flotillas which evacuated patients along canals and rivers. In May 1919, she was awarded with the Royal Red Cross by King George V, for bravery when evacuating a field hospital under bombardment.

Australian nurses Leah Rosenthal, and Isabella Jobson, volunteered with the QAIMNS. They were good friends and business partners who had previously been running the Windarra Private Hospital in Toorak. They left Australia together on 18 December 1915 to volunteer with the QAIMNS, and were assigned to various British base hospitals in Northern France, until December 1916 when they were both assigned to No. 33 Casualty Clearing Station in Béthune. They were among the first nurses trained in anaesthetics. They were often working under fire, and Rosenthal reported home that she would wear a gas mask on her shoulders to cross between buildings in case of an emergency. Rosenthal collected, and sent home souvenirs of used shot and shell pieces which had hit the hospitals. Both women received the Royal Red Cross (second class) for their service. After they returned to Australian in 1919, where they entered into another business venture together running the Vimy House private hospital. They named the hospital after the Battle of Vimy Ridge, which was an important victory by the Allies carried out by Canadian troops.

== Other auxiliary organisations ==
=== The Australian Hospital in Paris ===
At the outbreak of war, Melbourne surgeon Helen Sexton had recently retired from surgery due to ill health, and was in Europe. She travelled back home to Australia, and started rallying support, supplies, and funding to establish a military hospital unit. Sexton had experience in founding a hospital, having co-foundered the Queen Victoria Hospital in Melbourne. Furthermore, she was highly regarded, and carried letters of recommendation on official commonwealth stationery from people such as the chief justice Sir John Madden; the founder of the Australian branch of the British Red Cross, Lady Helen Munro Ferguson, as well as the president of the Victorian division, Lady Margaret Stanley, and her husband, the Governor of Victoria, Lord Stanley. Other recommendations came from military figures such as Vice Admiral Sir William Creswell, and Colonel Richard H. Fetherston and academic Harry Brookes Allen. However, despite these recommendations, her offer to run and fully fund a military hospital unit was declined by both the Australian, and the British Imperial Forces.

Instead Sexton's offer was taken up by the French Army and in July 2015, she began setting up the Hôpital Australien de Paris in Auteuil with a team of nine women including the team of six she recruited in Australia, Susan Smith and her two daughters Alison and Lorna, Constance Blackwood, Florence Inglis, and Dora Wilson, and three additional Australian women, Audrey and Eileen Chomley and Suzanne Caubet who met them in France. Caubet was a senior volunteer administrator, and director of the French Red Cross at the Buffon Centre, which adjoined the Military hospital Val de Grace, She was instrumental in establishing, supplying and managing the hospital. The unit received its first patients, wounded French soldiers, in late July 2015, and it was officially opened on 4 August 1915.

=== Scottish Women's Hospitals for Foreign Service ===
Scottish Women's Hospitals for Foreign Service (SWH) was formed by Scottish doctor Elsie Inglis. Inglis had offered her surgical skills to the British War Office, and was told “my good lady, go home and sit still”. Instead, she raised funds and formed a series of 14 medical units, run by women in France, Serbia, Greece, Russia, and Corsica. Around 1500 women volunteered in the service making up almost all of the staff of doctors, nurses, orderlies, ambulance drivers, cooks and administrators. The SWH provided Australian women who were not nurses, or did not meet the strict criteria of the Australian or British nursing units, with an opportunity to serve overseas directly in the war effort. In particular, the SWH provided opportunities for the doctors who, often with decade of experience, had their applications to volunteer rejected by the Australian and British militaries. In a full-page spread about the service, in January 1918, the Sydney Mail stated:

No individual medical unit in this war has accomplished more than the Scottish Women's Hospitals. [...] The glorious work they accomplished there was equalled only by the wonderful heroism of the members of the unit, many of whom suffered severely from sickness, privation, and utter exhaustion.

==== Royaumont, France ====
Millicent Sylvia Armstrong, a farmer and writer from New South Wales, volunteered as an orderley with the SWH at the Abbaye de Royaumont, Asnières-sur-Oise, and then at the Advance hospital at Villers-Cotterets, Aisne which the French military used as the Hôpital Auxiliaire d'Armées No.30. She entertained the wounded in soldiers by staging pantomimes, melodramas and variety shows with a cast of medical staff and some patients. When the German army advanced in May 1918, they had to evacuated to Royaumont. For the bravery she demonstrated rescuing the wounded patients while under fire, Armstrong was presented with the Croix de Guerre.

Another Australian working at the Abbey with the SWH was Dr. Elsie Dalyell, who had just completed eight months at Addington Park Military Hospital in Croyden, based in the diagnostic laboratory, when she arrived in Royaumont in 1916. She worked in the laboratory which has been established by Dr. Elizabeth Butler, a Scot who had a won the Beit Fellowship, just as Dalyell had, which was a prestigious award making them two of the most eminent female scientists in the pre-war period.

==== The Great Serbian Retreat and prisoners of war ====
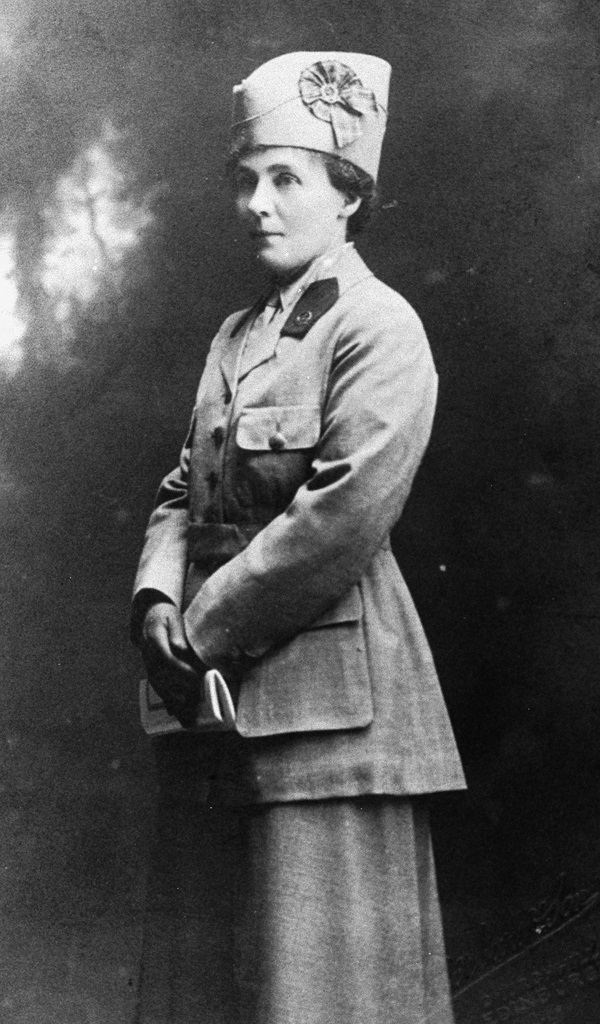
Dr. Laura Hope, in Scottish Women's Hospital uniform, 1915

The SWH had four units stationed in Serbia when, in the Winter of 1915, they were invaded leading to the Great Serbian Retreat. In September 1915, Dr. Laura Margaret Hope from Adelaide, sailed to London, accompanied by her husband Charles, who was also a doctor, to volunteer with the SWH. They were posted to different units in Serbia, Charles in a unit headed by British doctor, Alice Hutchinson in Valjevo and 100 km to the east, Hope was posted to a 300-bed hospital unit at Mladanovatz under command of Scottish doctor Beatrice McGregor. On Hope's arrival she was met and welcomed by Elsie Inglis, the founder of SWH, then quickly began working to assist the doctors working on a backlog of patients who had gas gangrene in their wounds. Charles' unit at Valjevo had to evacuate immediately after he arrived, and two days later Hope's unit was evacuated to Kragujevac. In the new hospital, Hope observed the procedure for amputating limbs in surgery on the first day, and by the end of the week she had attended to 180 patients. On 25 October they were ordered to evacuate again. Hope decided to join Charles and his unit, which was about to evacuate to Vrinjatcha Banja.

Had Hope stayed with her unit, she would have had to decide whether to join the Great Serbian Retreat, evacuating patients across freezing Mule tracks through the Albanian and Montenegrin mountains, or to join Inglis and other staff who stayed with patients too unwell to be moved, becoming prisoners of war. Instead, with Charles's unit, the decision was made for her. In early November, Hope, Charles, and the other 32 medical staff awoke to find that the Austrian Army had quietly taken possession of Vrinjatcha Banja during the night, and they were now prisoners of war. Their captors made them work on their wounded soldiers for three weeks, before forcing them to walk 11 km in the snow to board a train for Krushevatz. A few days later on 4 December, they were loaded into a cattle truck for a bumpy thirty-six hour drive with no food, and little sleep, arriving in Semendria to cross the Danube river to Hungary. They were jeered at by German soldiers while they waited to cross. After another 150 km journey, they arrived in Kevevara, and housed in two unfurnished room with straw for beds. They would spend Christmas and New Years here, with insufficient rations, supplemented by them selling their belongings to buy food from the locals. The locals were kind to them, and would smuggle them food. In the new year, they were put on a train, that headed to the Swiss boarder and their freedom on 8 February 1916.

==== The Girton and Newnham Unit ====
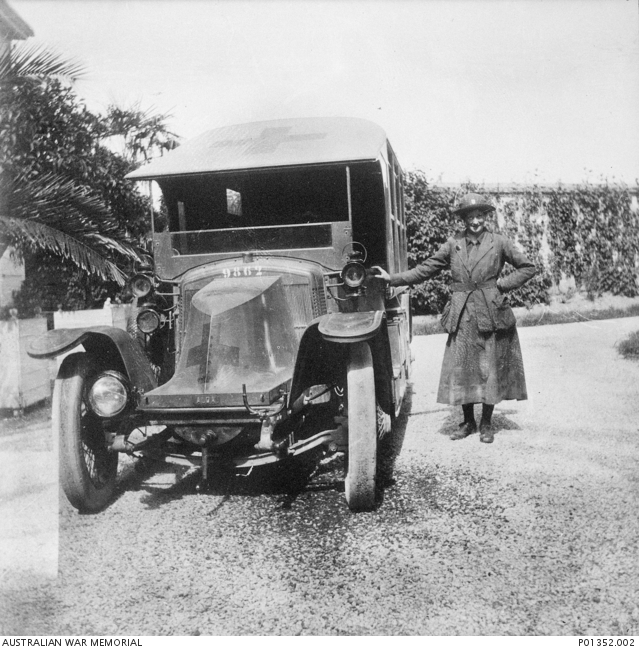
Olive Kelso King, standing beside "Ella", her ambulance lorry

Named after the University of Cambridge colleges, Girtan and Newnham who provided the funding, the unit was a mobile hospital attached to the French Expeditionary Force, supporting them close to the front lines of their battles first in France, then Serbia, and in Salonika.

Australian Olive Kelso King from Sydney, joined the unit in France, in the spring of 1915. She had recently returned from Belgium where she had been volunteering with the Allied Field Ambulance Corps (AFAC) as a driver. She had supplied her own vehicle, a 16-seat ambulance she had converted from a 3-litre French Alda lorry, which she named "Ella". However, King and two other volunteers had been detained when the AFAC organisers came under suspicion of spying. The AFAC abandoned King, taking her lorry with them. Due to her German language skills, she was able to talk their way out of detention, just in time to escape the advancing German army. She returned to England, and was able to retrieve Ella the lorry, before signing up with SWH and taking Ella with her. After six months in France, the unit sailed to Salonika in October 1915 on the SS Mossoul, to the Serbians in their fight against Austro-Hungarians, Germans and Bulgarians. They landed at Salonika on 4 November 1915, and established a hospital in an old silk factory in Gevgelija close enough to the front to hear the continuous drone of the guns. They had to quickly dismantle the hospital after six months as the enemy advanced, and King and the other drivers had to evacuate patients, narrowly escaping before the station was bombed. They retreated back to Salonika where they set up their canvas hospital. In mid 1916, King and "Ella" left the SWH to join the medical service branch of the Serbian army. She rose in the ranks becoming a sergeant, and then in 1917 she responded to a huge fire that broke out in Salonika, driving for 20 hours back and forth transporting patients, staff, and civilians to safety. She was awarded a Serbian silver medal for bravery.

==== The Ostrovo Unit, in Serbian Macedonia ====
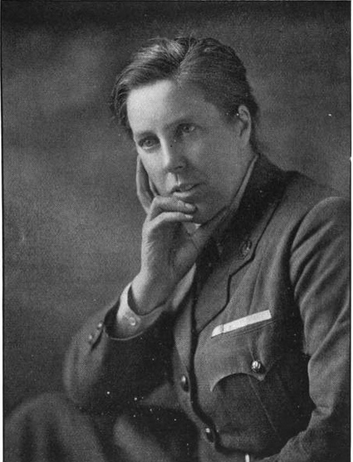
Dr. Agnes Bennett, Chief Medical Officer

The Scottish Women's Hospitals was a 200-bed hospital unit, functioning as a casualty clearing station, and field hospital, and supported the Serbian Army. The unit was funded by American donations, and was referred to as "the American unit". After working in the infectious diseases hospital in Cairo, Agnes Bennett an Australian, New Zealand doctor met with Elsie Ingles at the Lyceum club in London. Inglis and the SWH were recuperating and regrouping after the Great Retreat, and were recruiting more staff. Bennet signed up, and Inglis tasked her with establishing a new unit to in Serbia and serve as the Chief Medical Officer close to the front line, in the hills at Lake Ostrovo. Bennett headed the unit for 16 months, until she caught malaria and was forced to resign due to ill-health. She returned to Egypt, where she learned of her brother Bob's death at the Battle of Passchendaele. Deep in grief, she boarded the troopship HMAT Wiltshire to return to Australia. Bennett was awarded a Serbian Order of St. Sava third class for her contributions as the Chief Medical Officer of the Ostrovo Unit in The SWH.

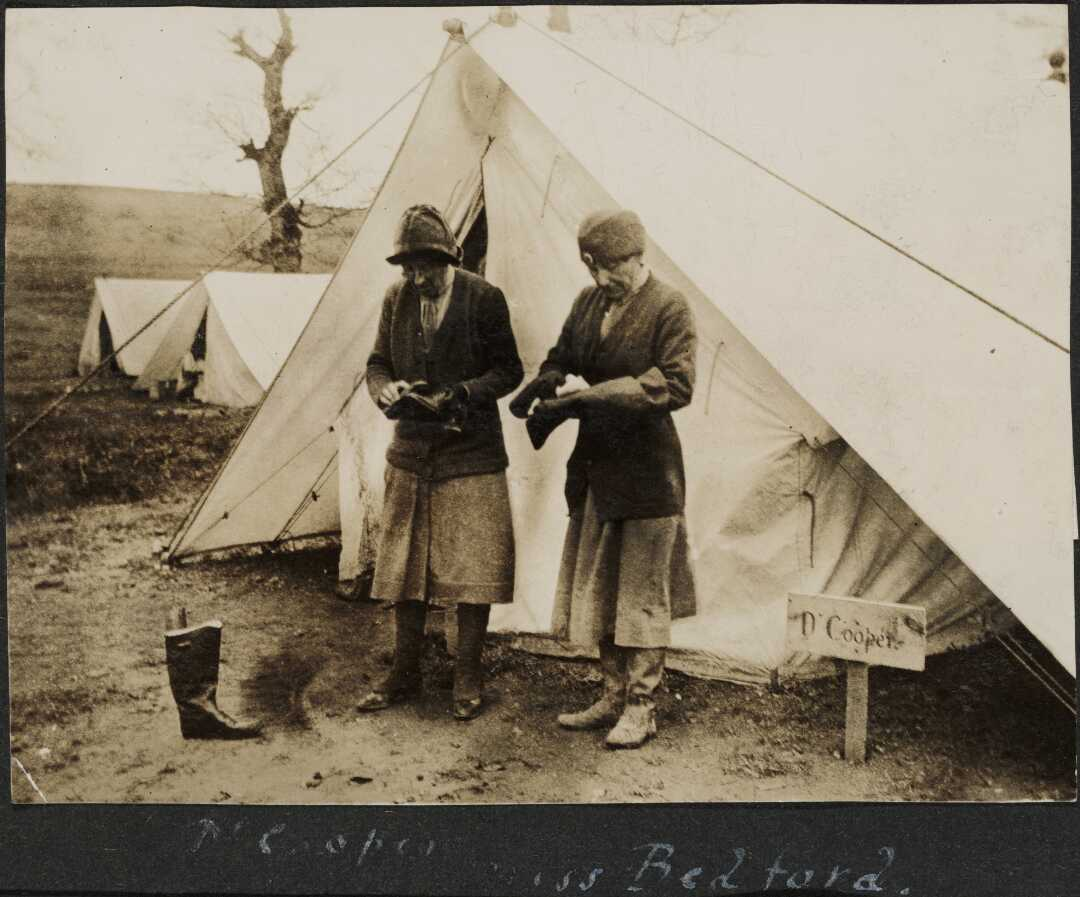
Dr. Lilian Cooper and Josephine Bedford, Serbia c.1916-1917

British-born Australian doctor Lilian Violet Cooper, travelled from Australia with in September 1916 to volunteer as a surgeon with the Ostrovo unit. She was accompanied by her term companion Mary Josephine Bedford, who had mechanical knowledge, and became Chief Transport Officer, in charge of the Ambulance fleet. Bedford’s ability to source spare parts for the fleet of 12 converted T-model Ford ambulances led to her the nickname ‘Miss Spare Parts’. After eight months at the Ostrovo unit, having performed 144 surgeries, Cooper's reoccurring bronchitis developed into pneumonia in August 1917. Cooper and Bedford departed for London, where Cooper would recuperate, before they returned home to Brisbane. They were both awarded the Order of St Sava, Cooper a 4th Class, and Bedford a 5th class, for their service in the unit.

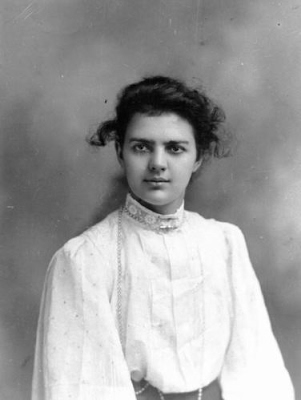
Dr. Mary De Garis, Chief Medical Officer

Australian doctor Mary De Garis from Melbourne, arrived at the Ostrovo unit in early 2017. After the Australian Army had refused her application to serve in 1915, De Garis had stayed working as a doctor in Australia until mid-1916. This was when her fiancé Sergeant Colin Thomson, who had survived Gallipoli, was deployed to the Western Front. De Garis's anxiety for him saw her travel to London, arriving on 14 July 1916, to take a role at the Manor War Hospital, as a means to be closer to him. However, soon after arriving, Thomson's postcards stopped and De Garis received the news that he had died on 4 August, at the battle at Pozieres. In the following months, she channelled her grief into taking action, resigning from the Manor War Hospital, and applying to the SWH. In December 2016, her application was accepted, and she was appointed as Bennett's second in command of the Ostrovo unit. De Garis took over the Ostrovo unit as the Chief Medical Officer when Bennett resigned. De Garis would stay as CMO for another year. In that time she, like most SWH staff, would suffer through bouts of serious sickness including typhoid, dysentery, and malaria. However, she remained an effective leader. She resigned as CMO in September 1918. De Garis was awarded a third class Order of St. Sava medal for her service. She said of her time in Macedonia:

I shall always remember my association with the SWH with pleasure. Practical experience has convinced me that women run things very well, making me a more ardent feminist than ever.

Australian novelist, Stella Miles Franklin joined the unit in July 1917. On her journey from London, she travelled through Paris, Turin, Rome, and Taranto, before boarding a troop transport carrying 3000 men, with only two other women, destined for Salonika. Once in Salonika she travelled to Ostrovo on a drive that she would describe as "the roughest journey I ever underwent". Working first as a cook then as an Matron's orderly, she was in charge of the stores of linen, bedding, clothing, and dressings. She said the work was hard physical labour, and they worked long hours, with only a half day free each week, and one full day per month. When they had free time, she would join the nurses for a swim in Lake Ostrovo, where she said they could be seen "dancing a spirited reel on the shores in their bathing tights". Franklin worked for 6 months, until the end of her contract in February 1918.

== Red Cross organisations ==
=== The formation of the Australian Red Cross ===
When World War I broke out, there was no Red Cross association in Australia. Nine days later, Lady Helen Munro Ferguson set up the first Red Cross headquarters in the ballroom of her home, Melbourne’s Government House. Initially formed as an Australian branch of the British Red Cross Society, this was the foundation of the Australian Red Cross. Unlike the British Red Cross, and the Canadian Red Cross, Ferguson saw an opportunity for the Australian Red Cross to be led by women, recruiting women in all levels of the organisation. She contacted the wives of the governor generals of all states of Australia, making them members of the central organisation, and invited them to establish their own local branches. They were:

- In New South Wales, Lady Edeline Strickland.
- In Victoria, Lady Margaret Evelyn Stanley.
- In South Australia, Lady Marie Galway.
- In Queensland, Lady Elsie Goold-Adams.
- In Western Australia, Lady Clara Barron.
- In Tasmania, Lady Ettie Ellison-Macartney
- In the Northern Territory, Jeannie Gilruth.

All the women accepted the appointment, each becoming the first president of their respective state’s Red Cross division.

==== The Australian Wounded and Missing Inquiry Bureau ====
When the war broke out Vera Deakin was encouraged to travel to Egypt to volunteer for the Australian Red Cross by her family friend Norman Brookes, who was a Red Cross commissioner based in Egypt. Her father Alfred Deakin disapproved of her leaving as he was worried for her safety, but her mother Pattie Deakin convinced him to let her go, and Pattie provided funding for Deakin's living expenses. Accompanied by her friend Winifred Johnson, she arrived in Egypt in October 1915 and became the secretary of the Australian Wounded and Missing Inquiry Bureau, with Johnson as her deputy. The AIF had been struggling to deal with the thousands of enquiries from concerned family of missing soldiers, they didn't have the resources. So Deakin and the Australian Red Cross set up the Bureau, to find track down information about the missing soldiers and reply to the families who requested information through corresponding Bureaux in each state division. The Bureau later opened an office in London, and Lilian Scantlebury joined and took charge of the letter writing division. After each battle the enquiries would come in rushes, and Deakin and the other workers would try to answer each letter personally, seeking out eyewitness accounts and other information to piece together answers to the questions. By mid 1916 the New South Wales division alone they were receiving 200 enquiries per day and had 4400 cases on file. In 1919 this had increased to 36,000 cases. Deakin was made an Officer of the Order of the British Empire (OBE) for her work at the Bureau.

==== The Australian Bluebirds ====
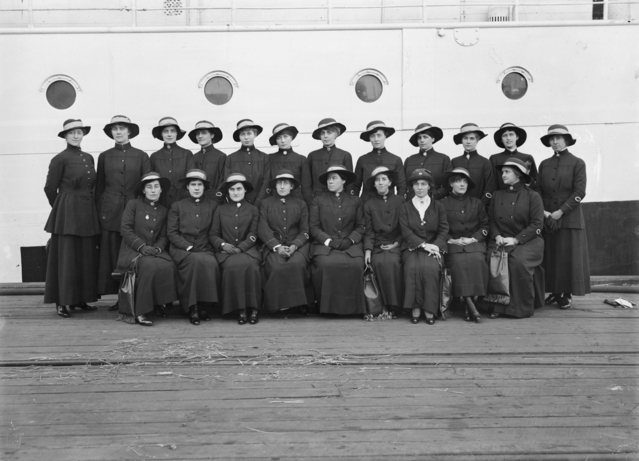
The Bluebird nurses onboard HMAT Kanowna.

The Australian Red Cross sent a number of VADs to work in military hospitals. This included a group of 20 professional nurses and a masseuse who were recruited to work in French hospitals. The group were dubbed the "Bluebirds" in reference to the colour of their uniforms specially designed from David Jones, and their service was funded by the Australian Jockey Club. Embarking on HMAT Kanowna in July 1916, they travelled to the western front to fill positions that the French Red Cross had been unable to fill due to nursing staff shortages. The nurses were accompanied by Mademoiselle Niau, a tutor tasked with teaching them French. Under contract with the New South Wales division of the Australian Red Cross, the Bluebirds, were closest to the front of any of the Australian Red Cross trained nursing volunteers. Little was published about their achievements in the war until research in the late 2010s. Like other privately funded volunteers in the war, did not receive Australian government recognition such as war gratuity or repatriation benefits on their return.

== Other volunteer work ==
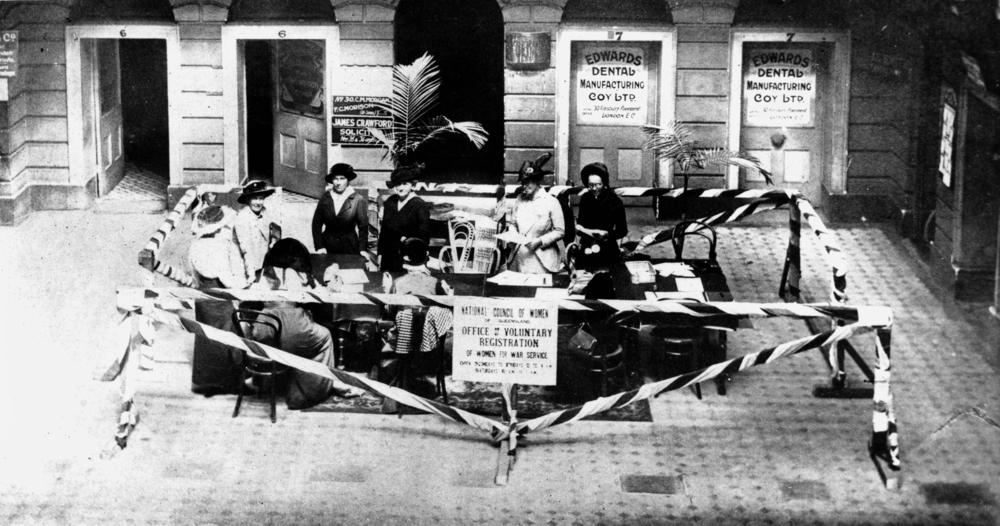
Women's Voluntary Registration Office, situated in the quadrangle of the Brisbane Town Hall, 1915. The office was established by the National Council of Women for the purpose of registering women willing to undertake work in connection with the war.

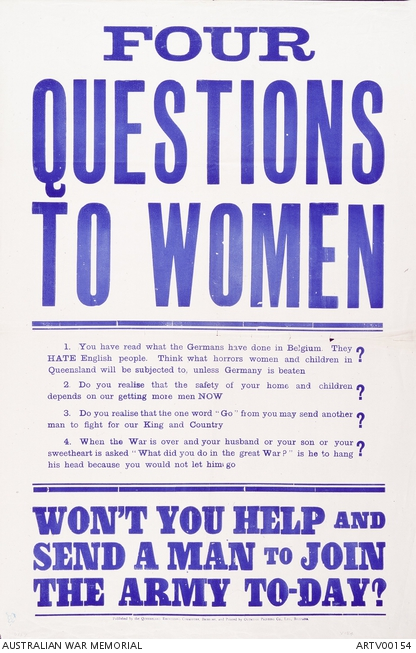
Recruitment posters urging women to get men to enlist

Hundreds of thousands of women in Australia assisted with the war effort primarily through volunteering for patriotic funds or war charities. There were charities such as the Australian Comforts Fund (ACF) which was the national organisation that oversaw the distribution from each state's comfort organisations which were:

- The Tasmanian On Active Service Fund.
- The War Chest, in New South Wales
- The Victoria League of Western Australia
- The Queensland Patriot Fund
- The Lady Mayoress' Patriotic League in Victoria
- The League of Loyal Women in South Australia

These ACF organisations were set up to look after Australian soldiers, providing welfare work on the home front and the war front. They also provided entertainment and concerts, pastoral care, and managed hostels. One of the most popular activities in this effort was organising comfort parcels for the soldiers serving overseas. Late in 1915 comfort parcels consisting of a billy can filled with items such as condensed milk, tins of food such as fruits and sardines, as well as pipes and tobacco, However, due to the evacuation at Gallipoli many soldiers did not receive theirs until they returned to Egypt or arrived in Lemnos.

There were also women's voluntary organisations which turn their focus to supporting the war effort, such as the Women's Christian Temperance Union, The Australian Women's National League, and the Cheer-Up Society

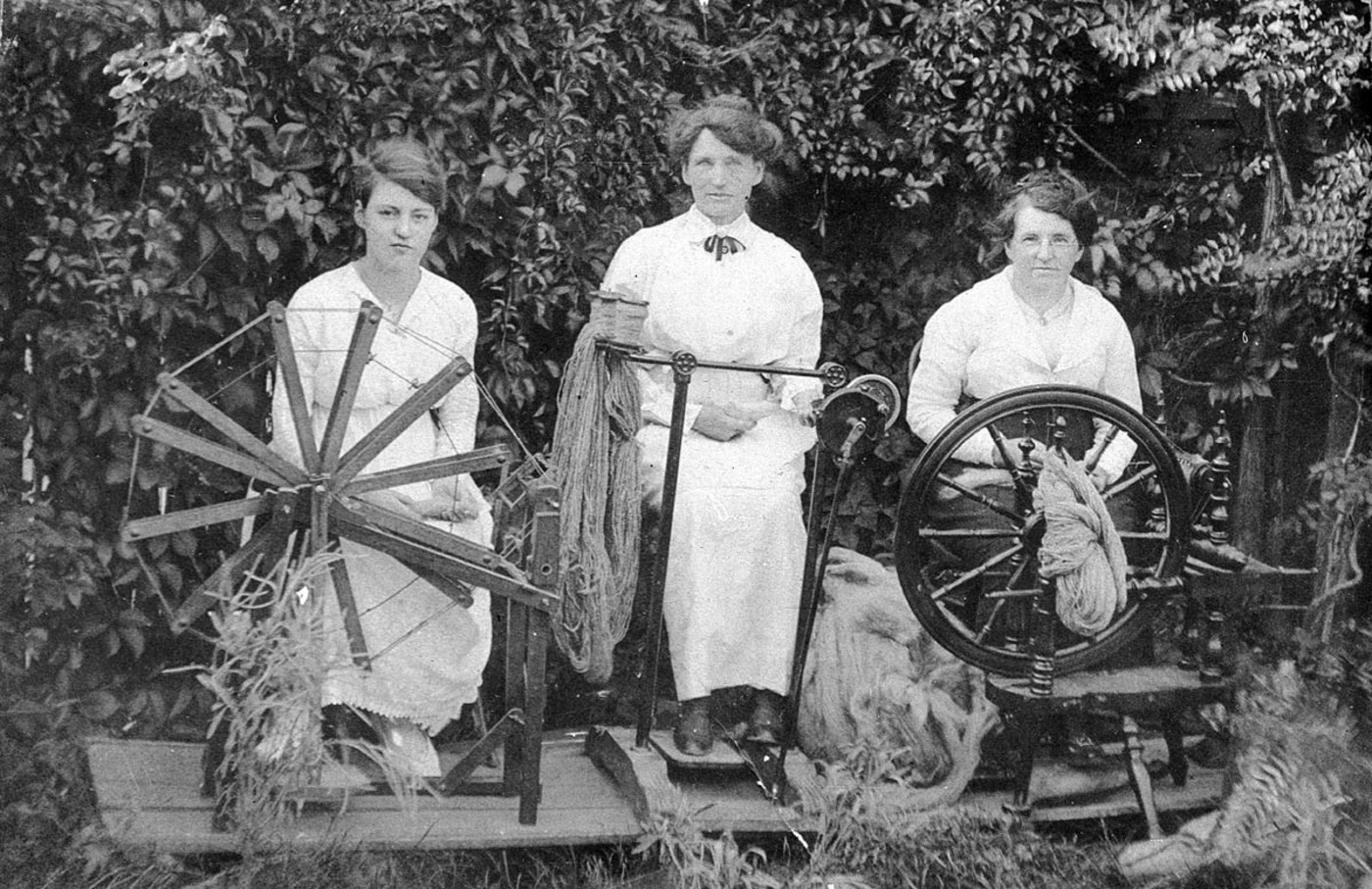
Three women spinning wool to knit socks for soldiers during World War I in Tenterfield, New South Wales, ca. 1915

== Other awards ==
The following women received medals or other awards for their war work:

- Phoebe Chapple (1879–1967) a South Australian medical doctor, was awarded the Military Medal for her heroic service in France during World War I.
- Flora Reid (1867–1950) Dame Grand Cross of the Order of the British Empire (DBE) was an inaugural recipient of the DBE for aiding convalescent soldiers

== Opposition to the war ==
Women in Australian also played in important role in the movements opposing the war. The activities of first wave feminist movements, had made recent gains, winning universal Women's suffrage in Australia in 1902 (albeit only for women over the age of 21 with European heritage), and had successfully pushed for other political and social rights, with many becoming pioneers in their various professional fields. However, when war broke out, the women in the feminist movements were divided, some supported the war, and used their skills and experience for the war effort, while others took an active stance against the war.

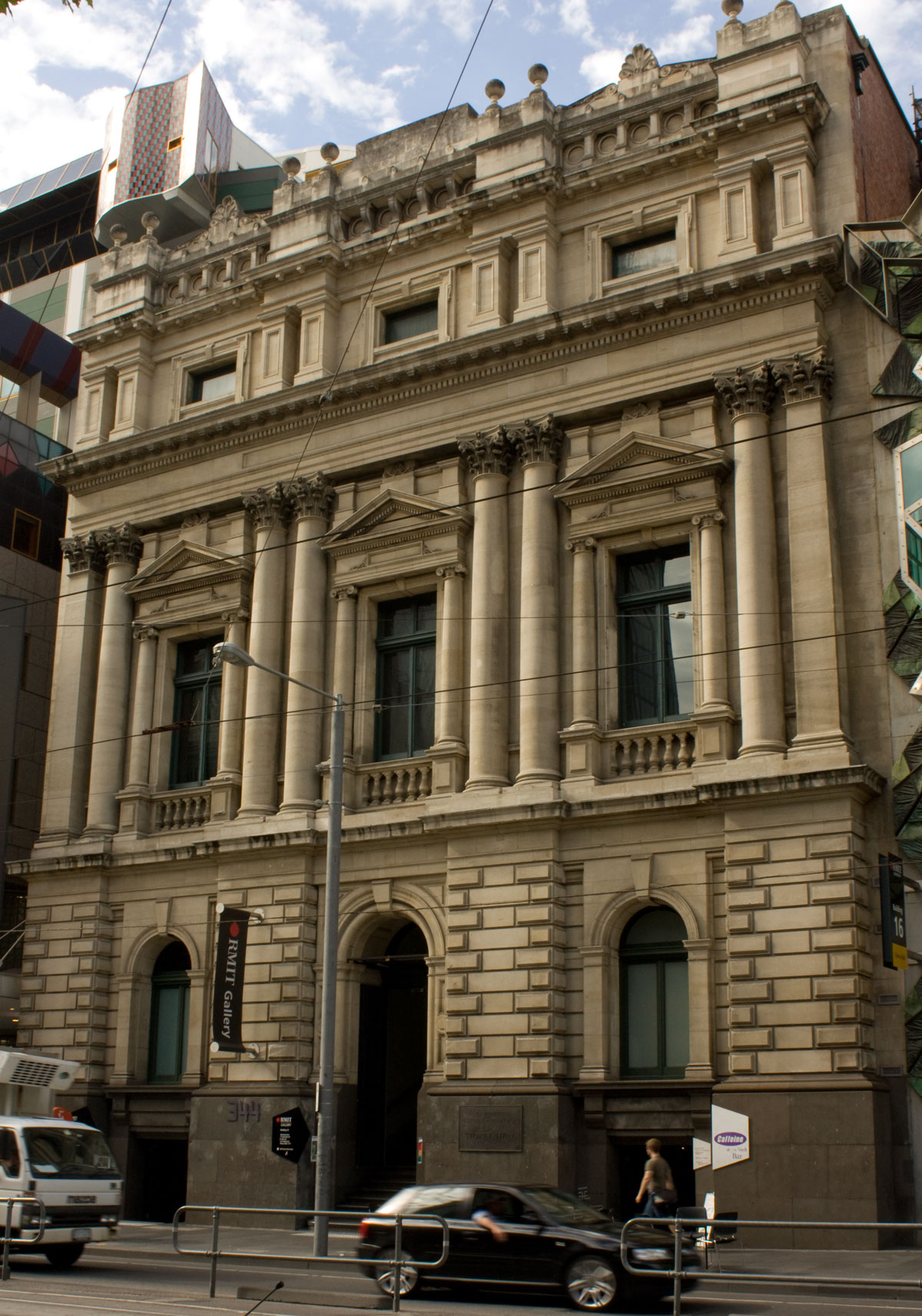
The Women's Political Association offices were based in what is now the Storey Hall, RMIT University.

Vida Goldstein was a Melbourne feminist and suffragist who campaigned for women's rights and ran for political office. In 1903, she founded The Women's Political Association (WPA), which aimed to educate women in political matters. By the time war broke out, the WPA's paper Women Voter, had already been expressing the organisation's stance against militarism. Goldstein herself stated:

I think that it is a fearful reflection on 2000 years of Christianity that men have rushed into war before using every combined effort to prevent this appalling conflict. It is my earnest hope that women in all parts of the world will stand together, demanding a more reasonable and civilised method of dealing with international disputes [...] The enfranchised women of Australia are political units in the British Empire, and they ought to lead the world in sane methods of dealing with these conflicts. While deprecating this war of aggression, I really cannot help thinking that Britain will reap what she has sown. The law of retribution affects nations as well as individuals.

Three days later Goldstein, in collaboration with Cecilia John, founded the Women's Peace Army which had the slogan "We War against war". John was a contralto singer, and her performances of the anti-war song 'I never raised my son to be a soldier' led to the song being banned. She was also put under surveillance by military authorities. In late 1916, the WPA took over the lease of what had been the guild hall on Swanston Street in Melbourne. The building is now called Storey Hall and is part of RMIT University.

The Women's peace army expanded to having branches in Queensland, New South Wales, and South Australia.

On 9 July 1917 in Brisbane, the Women's Peace Army protested a meetings of the Women's Compulsory Service Petition League which were voting to request that the federal government conscript reinforcements for the war. Margaret Thorp, and other activist gatecrashed the meeting, and resulted in the Conscription disturbance at the Brisbane School of Arts, on 9 July 1917.

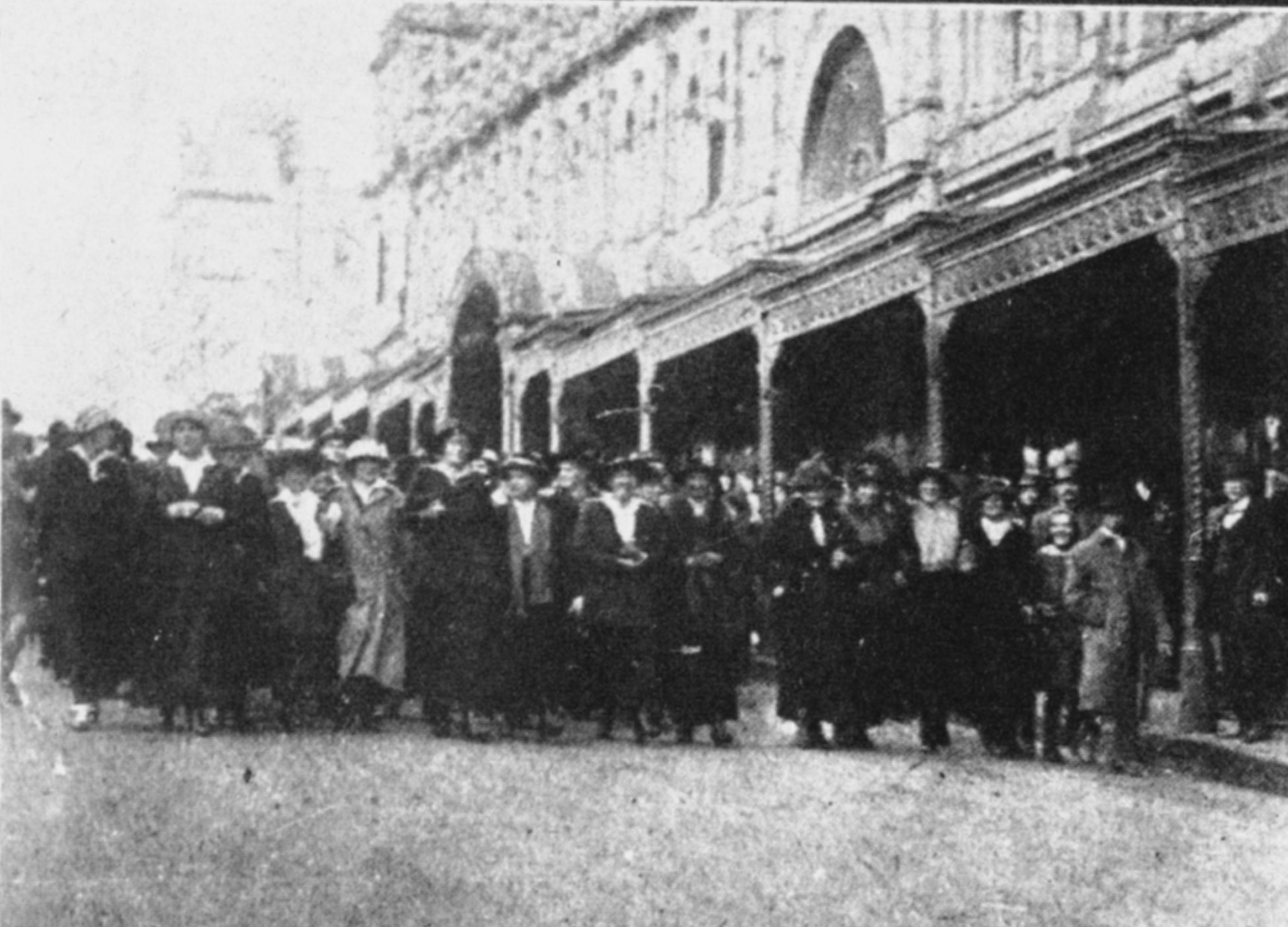
Marching in Bourke Street Melbourne over food, Women’s Peace Army, 1917

There was support for anti-war movements driven by the war-related inflation which saw food shortages which were felt largely by the working classes. This led to violent demonstrations and food riots in 2017 in Melbourne. On 22 August 2017, the Women's Peace Army led hundreds of women on a march to Parliament House demanding "we want food and fair play". The protestors attacked police with umbrellas and their hands, and the police drew batons and handcuffs, and arrested five people including Adela Pankhurst, and Elizabeth Wallace. A former suffragette Pankhurst was the daughter of British activist Emmeline Pankhurst, and after a rift formed between mother and daughter, Pankhurst was sent to live in Australia. Jennie Baines was another British suffragette, who left England in 1913 after being imprisoned and going on hunger strike multiple times. She also joined the Women's Peace Army, and was also arrested in anti-war protests with Pankhurst.

=== Other anti-war activists ===
- Doris Blackburn – (1889–1970) A politician, peace and civil rights activist from Victoria. She started her political life working as Goldstein's campaign secretary and from 1916 to 1917 campaigned against conscription with her husband Maurice Blackburn.
- Jennie Scott Griffiths – (1875–1951) An American journalist and political activist who lived in Australia from 1913 until 1920 where she became involved in the Women's Peace Army in Sydney, the Women's Anti-Conscription Committee, and the Children's Peace Army. She was sacked as editor of the Australian Woman's Weekly for her Anti-Conscription views.
- Bella Guerin – (1858–1923) A political activist and teacher from Victoria who gave public lectures against militarism and about rights to assembly and free speech, in Victoria and South Australia. She ran the Labor Women's Anti-Conscription Fellowship campaign during the 1916 Australian conscription referendum.
- Emma Miller – (1839–1917) A trade union organiser in Brisbane, who joined the Women's Peace Army with Margaret Thorp, and served as the vice president.
- Eleanor May Moore – (1875–1949) A peace activist from Victoria, who was the International secretary for the Australian Church's Sisterhood of International Peace, and was an executive member of the Australian Peace Alliance. She was expelled from the National Council of Women of Victoria for distributing Anti-Conscription pamphlets.
- Clara Weekes – (1852–1937) A teacher, trade unionist, and activist, who lived in Victoria, and was active in the Sisterhood of International Peace.

== See also ==
- World War I conscription in Australia
- Women in World War I
- Military history of Australia during World War I
- Home front during World War I
- Opposition to World War I
- Australian women during World War II
