= Margaret Thorp =

Australian welfare worker (1892–1978)

- Born: Margaret Sturge Thorp; 12 June 1892; Liverpool, England, United Kingdom
- Died: 5 May 1978 (aged 85); Australia
- Occupations: Peace activist, labour activist
- Parent(s): James Herbert Thorp; Annie Thorp

Margaret Sturge Thorp (12 June 1892 – 5 May 1978), also known as "The Peace Angel", was a peace activist and labour activist active in Australia in the 20th century. A Quaker, her religious beliefs guided her to a life of advocating for a variety of pacifist and feminist causes.

== Early life ==
Thorp was born in Liverpool in 1892, the second youngest of the five children of Dr. James Herbert Thorp, and his wife Annie. The family lived in a middle-class area not far from the slums of Liverpool, where the young Thorp would hear the sounds of "noise, shrieks, and drunken brawls" at night. Dr Thorp worked as a physician at the Richmond Road Medical Mission in the slums, and during her teenage years Margaret would often accompany her father to the mission where she would conduct discussions. While the Thorp family were committed Quakers, this religious philosophy having a profound effect and leading Margaret to a philosophy of pacifism that she would remain dedicated to for her whole life, the family had a rather liberal outlook for a Quaker family at the time. Musical entertainment, usually considered as frivolous by more conservative Quakers, was a constant feature at social gatherings and religious meetings held in the Thorp household.

In 1909, Thorp attended The Mount School in York, a girls' school run by Quakers, where social service and social justice were considered important aspects of school life. She went on to study at Woodbroke College in Birmingham in 1911, studying a mixture of subjects including international affairs and Quaker history. At Woodbroke, Thorp came into contact with several radical figures associated with the Young Friends Movement, including Barratt Brown, a member of the Independent Labour Party active in campaigning against conscription. At a Young Friends conference in Swanwick, Thorp was instrumental in the move to take a more active and assertive role against the practice of military conscription.

== Tasmania and North America ==
Thorp first visited Australia in 1911 with her family, at the age of nineteen. Originally arriving in Adelaide, they journeyed onto Hobart where Dr Thorp had been invited to temporarily fill in as the headmaster of the Friends' School there, to advise Quakers in Tasmania about the consequences of the Australian government's conscription policy. While in Australia, Dr Thorp also became interested in the issue of conscription, being involved in the formation of the Anti-Military Service League with members of other religious denominations. The Thorp family was shocked on their arrival in Hobart to find that the school was "over-run" by young military cadets in uniform, who would go as far as to salute the family when they walked past. Dr Thorp took steps to demilitarise the school, causing some controversy amongst the non-Quaker members of the community on whom the school relied.

While in Hobart, Thorp was involved in the creation of a chapter of the Australian Freedom League (AFL), a body descended from the Thorp Anti-Military Service League that her father had been involved in founding. The AFL was not totally pacifist in nature, concerning itself primarily with opposition to the notion of compulsory military service, and was formed from a broad coalition of community organisations, including pacifist groups but also socialists and trade unionists. She was a delegate to the first AFL national conference (in Adelaide) in 1913, and spoke often about the perceived moral deterioration that camp life and the drill hall caused in young men and boys. When not involved with the AFL, Thorp was a keen rower, and played field hockey competitively.

The Thorp family returned to England in April 1914, although at the time they intended to return to Hobart and make it their permanent home. Thorp remained active in Quaker circles, touring North America with a delegation of Young Friends starting in June. It was here, at a resort in Pennsylvania that she learned that war had been declared in Europe. She returned to England (but not before speaking to an audience of thousands of Quakers at a conference in Saratoga Springs, New York) on the RMS Olympic, and shortly thereafter the family returned as a whole to Australia, settling in the town of Toowoomba, west of Brisbane, Queensland.

== Women's Peace Army ==
The Women's Peace Army (WPA) was an organisation that had been set up by noted suffragist Vida Goldstein in Melbourne, with branches established in Brisbane and Sydney. After her parents had settled into their new home, Thorp had intended to embark on a "peace mission" in Brisbane, however her reputation had preceded her and she was approached by WPA members Adela Pankhurst and Cecilia John and asked to establish and promote the WPA in Queensland. Although initially hesitant to get involved given the WPA's reputation for militancy, Thorp soon became a prominent leader and spokesperson of the organisation in Brisbane. She spoke in front of a number of prominent women's organisations, including the Young Women's Christian Association, the Red Cross, and the National Council of Women, however she gained most support from her association with Emma Miller and through her, other organisations on the political left. At its peak under Thorp's leadership, the WPA had approximately a hundred and thirty financial members, had branches in regional towns such as Ipswich and Rockhampton, and support from a much wider circle of supporters, although only a small proportion of the financial members were involved in the day-to-day running of the organisation.

Thorp was often outspoken in her advocacy on issues such as conscription, and on occasion this led to conflict with advocates for opposing points of view. In one incident in 1917, Thorp was involved in a series of violent confrontations at the Brisbane School of Arts, where she led a group of WPA members trying to disrupt a meeting of the Women's Compulsory Service Petition League. Trying to take to the podium to read an anti-conscription message, Thorp was knocked to the ground by the enraged pro-conscriptionists and was punched, scratched, and kicked. Following this incident, a badly shaken Thorp relinquished her leadership role in the WPA, handing over to fellow activist Kathleen Hotson, and returned to Toowoomba to care for her ailing father. By early 1918, she was in Buderim at the home of her brother Elliot.

== After the war ==
Following the end of the war and the demise of conscription as a political issue, Thorp returned to England in 1920. She became active in war relief, working in Berlin and the Volga area of Russia under the British Red Cross Society. In 1923, she returned to Australia once more, settling in Sydney, where on 1 October 1925 she married Arthur Watts, a fellow Quaker whom she had first met during her days in the AFL, and who had also been active in war relief in Europe until he had contracted typhoid in Russia. During this time she continued to be active in community work, including with the City Girls' Amateur Sports Association, the Young Women's Christian Association, and the New South Wales Society for Crippled Children. Arthur left Australia for Russia permanently in 1931; Thorp did not share her husband's enthusiasm for all things Russian and disapproved of the direction that the communist government was taking the country, and they were divorced in 1936.

In later life she continued to be active in social causes. She was appointed as a Justice of the Peace in 1955, and then as an MBE in 1957. She retired from active work in 1962; however, she continued to be active with groups such as the Quaker Service Council. She was a fierce critic of the Vietnam War and arranged for the adoption of Vietnamese war orphans by Australian families. She died in May 1978.
