= Conscription disturbance at the Brisbane School of Arts =

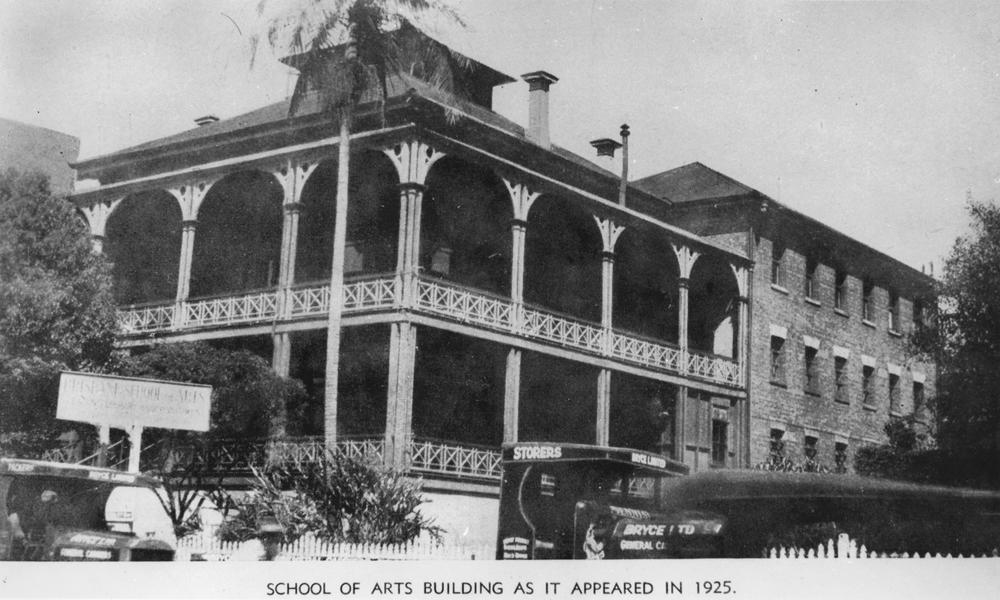
The Brisbane School of Arts, where the disturbance occurred

On 9 July 1917, a disturbance broke out at the Brisbane School of Arts, when a meeting of the Women's Compulsory Service Petition League was interrupted by activists from the Women's Peace Army, with the confrontation degenerating into violence and mayhem.

== Background ==
A plebiscite was held in 1916 in Australia to introduce conscription in order to bolster recruitment rates for the Australian Imperial Force (AIF), which was deployed in Europe fighting in the Great War. The plebiscite was narrowly defeated, but with the war still raging in Europe the question of conscription remained a live one. When Prime Minister Billy Hughes was decisively re-elected at the 1917 general election, proposing to hold a second plebiscite on the question of conscription, tensions began to flare in the community between supporters and opponents.

The Women's Compulsory Service Petition League was one of the myriad groups formed in this period. It advocated that a plebiscite was unnecessary and that Parliament should simply legislate the conscription of all able bodied men into law. Many of its members were women whose husbands or sons had enlisted and were currently at the front.

== The meeting ==
During the evening, approximately 300 women assembled at the School of Arts for the purpose of holding a meeting, where motions would be passed requesting the federal government to immediately begin conscripting men for the purposes of providing reinforcements at the front, without the delay of holding a second plebiscite. Despite some warning in advance that the meeting may be disrupted by protestors, it proceeded calmly at first, until the first resolution was put. At this point, Margaret Thorp, a labour activist and a member of the Women's Peace Army, who had gatecrashed the meeting with approximately 20 other activists, attempted to move an amendment that pointed out the impossibility of overriding the democratic verdict of the people from the plebiscite. The assembled women reacted with fury, and several women attempted to physically eject Thorp from the hall. Several other members of the WPA came to Thorp's aid, and within minutes the meeting had devolved into a fracas, with clothing being torn and blows being exchanged between the two sides.

In the chaos, Thorp managed to reach the platform in order to try and read out her amendment, but she was again set upon, thrown to the floor, and punched, scratched and kicked. The outnumbered WPA members were eventually thrown out of the hall, and after a brief delay for a rendition of the national anthem by the women present, the meeting was continued, only to be disrupted a second time when Thorp arrived with a police officer. The police officer informed the meeting that the WPA members had as much right as anyone else to be present, before leaving the scene. The meeting then quickly dissolved a second time into violence, the WPA again being ejected from the building. Thorp managed to enter the hall a third time, this time through a side door, her call for "Three cheers for no conscription" being drowned out by shouted abuse as she led a small group of followers from the building.

== Aftermath ==
Despite the disturbances, the meeting managed to pass the two resolutions that it had convened for. The local press, although operating under wartime censorship, reported extensively on the affair, with The Daily Standard describing their actions as a "disgraceful display". Anna Paterson, who had moved the original resolution, expressed dismay at the idea that a pro-conscription meeting might be disrupted by those opposing it, being quoted in The Telegraph as saying that "if such an idea were permitted to prevail, the sacred right of a free people to meet and lawfully organise in order to achieve some definite purpose would be destroyed".

Thorp, who until this time had viewed violence as an exclusively male weakness, was badly shaken by the events. Not only had she been placed in physical danger, but her belief in the essentially nonviolent nature of women had been challenged. A week after the event, Thorp wrote to a friend in Melbourne advising that she was "giving up peace work", and deferring leadership of the WPA in Queensland to fellow activist Kathleen Hotson. A well attended WPA meeting carried a resolution commending Thorp for her bravery and persistence, and expressed outrage at the "outrageous treatment to which she was subjected".
