= Dogslacks =

Coordinates: 55.074°N 3.244°W

- Location within Dumfries and Galloway
- OS grid reference: NY206762
- Council area: Dumfries and Galloway
- Lieutenancy area: Kirkcudbrightshire
- Country: Scotland
- Sovereign state: United Kingdom
- Post town: Lockerbie
- Postcode district: DG11
- Dialling code: 01576
- Police: Scotland
- Fire: Scottish
- Ambulance: Scottish
- UK Parliament: Dumfries and Galloway; Dumfriesshire, Clydesdale and Tweeddale
- Scottish Parliament: Galloway and Upper Nithsdale

Dogslacks is a farmstead in the Parish of Middlebie, in the Stewartry of Kirkcudbright in Scotland.
