= Alice Cashin =

Australian WWI military nurse

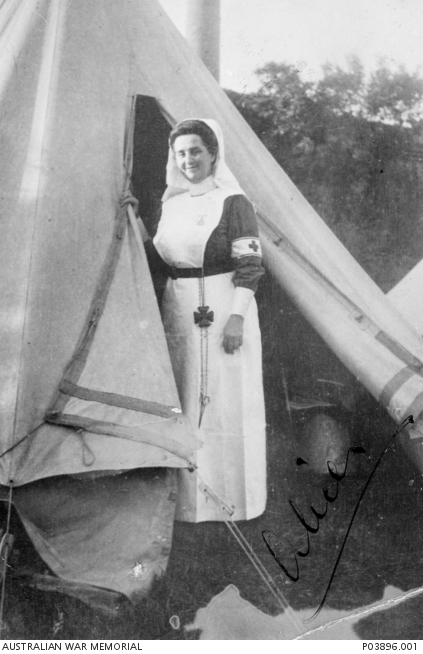
- Sister Alice Cashin, in front of a tent in the grounds of a British General Hospital in Calais, France, c. 1915
- Born: 26 March 1870; Melbourne, Victoria, Australia
- Died: 4 November 1939 (aged 69); Marrickville, New South Wales, Australia
- Burial place: Woronora Cemetery, New South Wales
- Military career
- Allegiance: United Kingdom
- Branch: Army Nursing Service
- Service years: 1914–1919
- Rank: Matron
- Unit: Queen Alexandra's Imperial Military Nursing Service
- Conflicts: First World War
- Awards: Royal Red Cross & Bar; Mentioned in Despatches (2)

Alice Alanna Cashin, RRC & Bar (6 March 1870 – 4 November 1939) was a decorated Australian nurse who served with Queen Alexandra's Imperial Military Nursing Service during the First World War.

== Early life and education ==
Alice Alanna Cashin was born on 6 March 1870 in Melbourne, the daughter of boot-maker Richard and Catherine Cashin (née Meehan). Her mother died the following year. The family moved to Sydney, where Cashin was educated at a private ladies college. Her father was later acknowledged as pioneer of the Independent Order of Odd Fellows in New South Wales.

Cashin completed her nursing training at St Vincent's Hospital in Darlinghurst, before working as a private nurse. In July 1901 she joined the Australasian Trained Nurses' Association. In 1909 Cashin sailed to England to develop her skills in therapeutic massage.

== War service ==
Shortly after the outbreak of the First World War, Cashin was nursing in France with the British Red Cross. In 1915 she joined Queen Alexandra's Imperial Military Nursing Service Reserve. She was placed in charge of a hospital's surgical ward in Ras-el-din, Egypt. While there, she was twice mentioned in despatches before being awarded the Royal Red Cross in January 1917.

In June 1916 Cashin was transferred to HMHS Gloucester Castle, where she was matron of the hospital ship. On 30 March 1917 the ship was torpedoed by a German U-boat. Before seeking rescue herself, she ensured that all the wounded soldiers on board as well as the nurses in her charge were transferred from the ship. Only three of the 399 passengers were killed. For this, she was awarded a bar to the Royal Red Cross.

Cashin's next posting was two years as matron of the 400-bed Lichfield Military Hospital from 7 May 1917. As well as the fur cape, muff and cap given by Queen Alexandra to all members of the Imperial Military Nursing Service Reserve, Cashin's service was acknowledged by the nursing staff of Lichfield Hospital who presented her with a gold link bracelet, inscribed with her war record.

== Post war ==
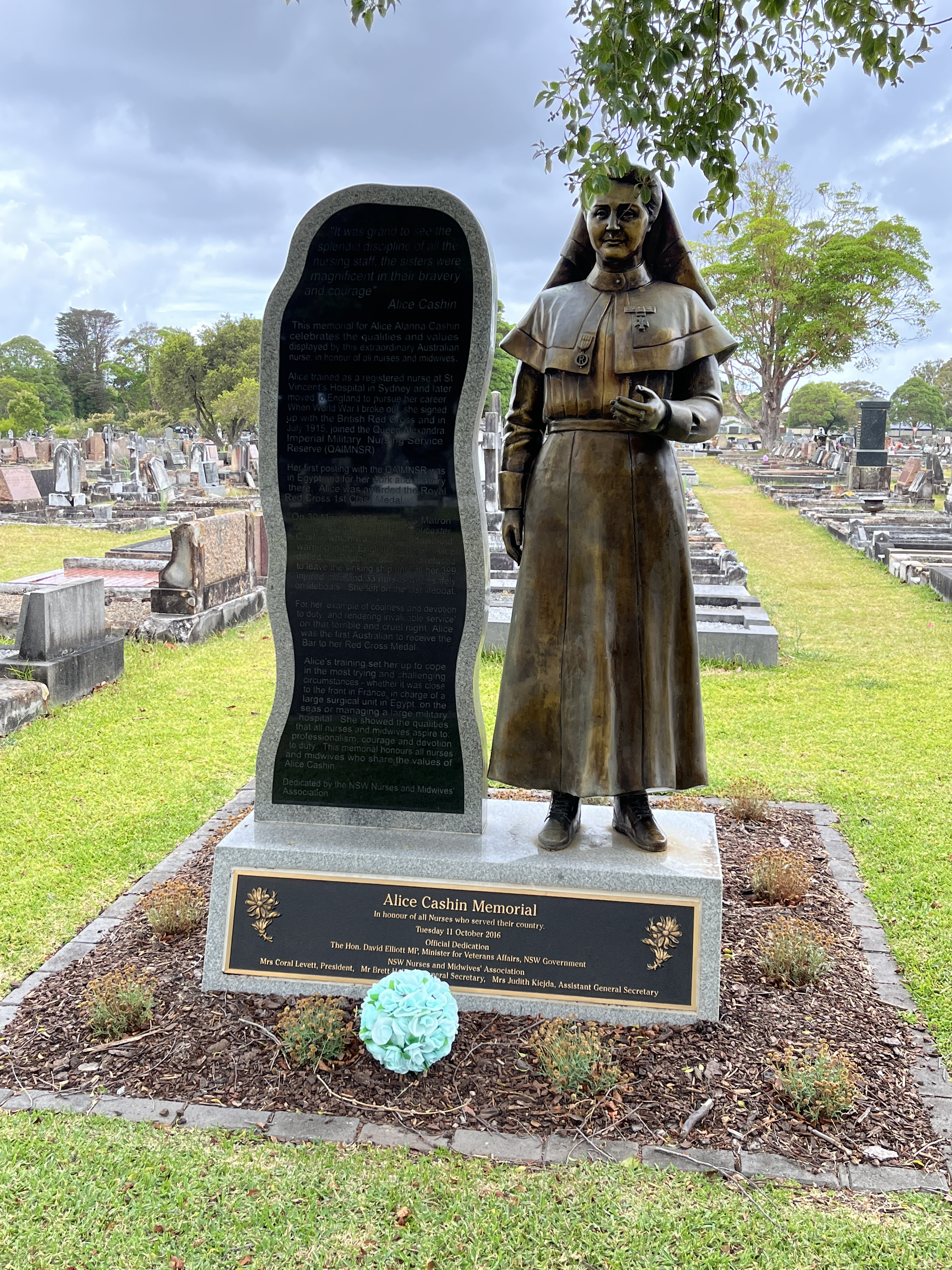
Statue of Alice Cashin in Woronora Cemetery

Returning to Australia, Cashin cared for her elderly father and later was employed as a saleswoman. In 1924, representing the Diggers, she took part in a competition to raise funds for the Marrickville Anzac Memorial Hall. She was named Queen of Marrickville, receiving 75,346 votes, well ahead of Mrs Cruse (48,186) and Mrs Harris (42,369).

Cashin died on 4 November 1939 at her home in Marrickville of chronic nephritis. Her funeral mass was held at St Bridget's Catholic Church, before her burial at Woronora Cemetery. She had never married. A memorial statue of Cashin was unveiled on her previously unmarked grave in 2016. Her medals and badges are held in the Anzac Memorial in Sydney.
