= Waterbeck =

Village in Dumfries and Galloway

- Village
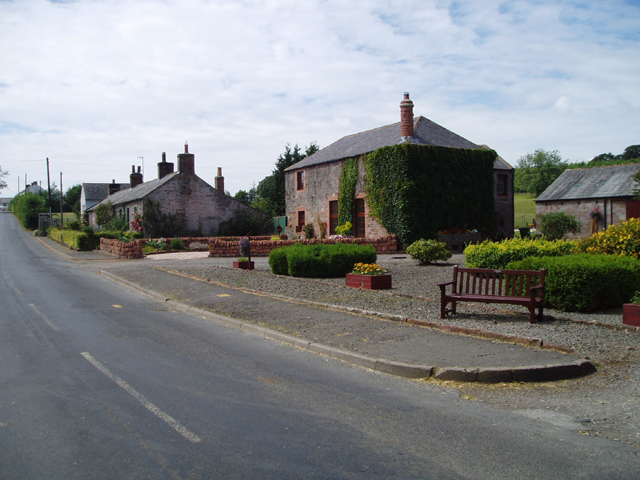
- Interactive map of Waterbeck
- Coordinates: 55.0874°N 03.1786°W

Government
  - Body: Dumfries and Galloway Council
- Elevation: 103.1 m (338 ft)

Population (1961)
  - Total: 75

Waterbeck is a small village in Annandale, Dumfries and Galloway. It is located on Beck Water in the parish of Middlebie.

Waterbeck contains a former United Presbyterian church and a primary school. Most buildings in the village are cottages from the 19th century. Waterbeck has a village hall. Originally a school, it was built around 1900.

Waterbeck is the birthplace of Sir John Carruthers Beattie.
