= Charlotte Crivelli =

French Australian philanthropist (1863–1956)

Madame Charlotte Crivelli
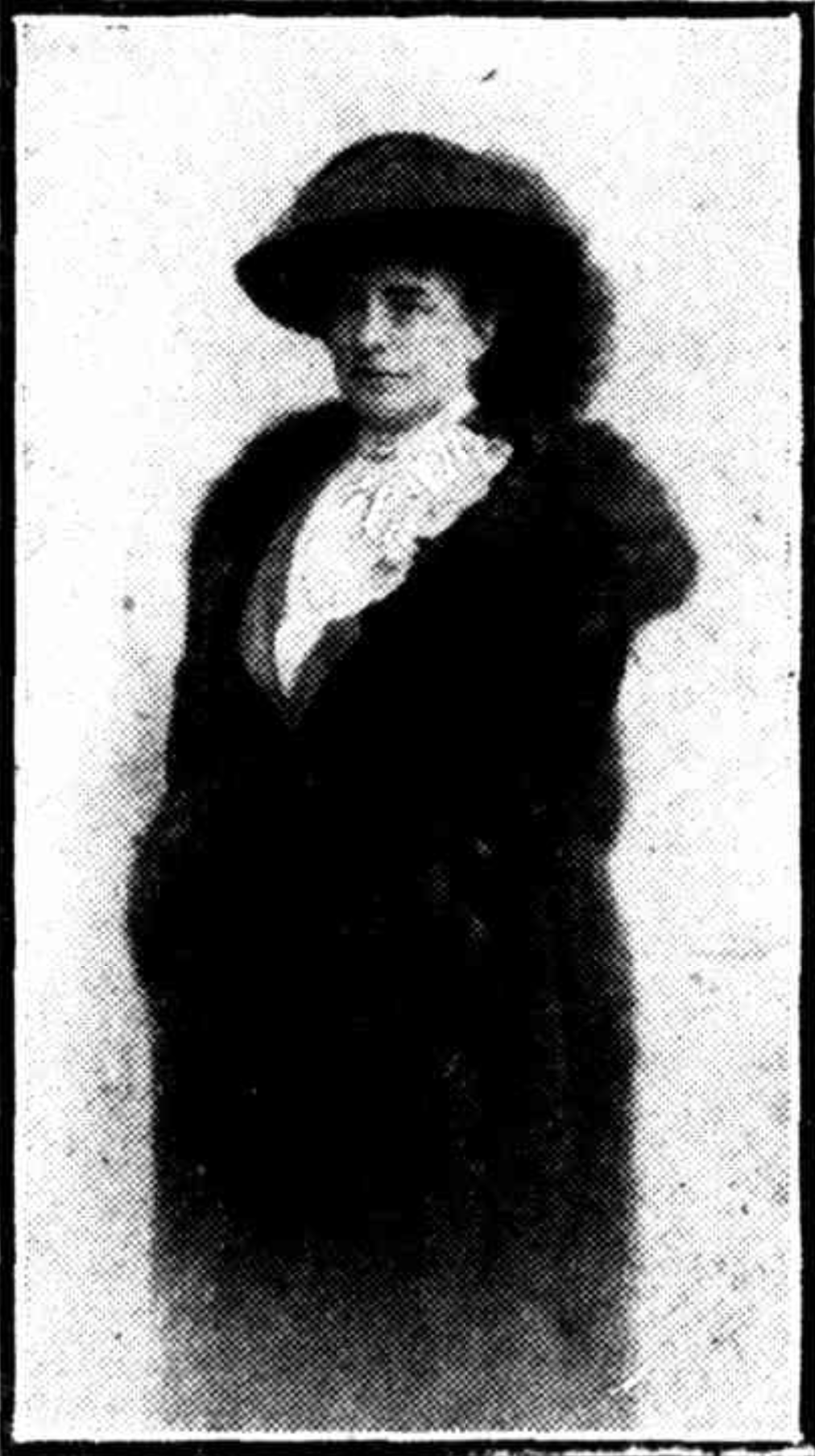
- Charlotte Crivelli c.1916 or earlier
- Born: Marie Louise Charlotte Duret; 24 June 1863; Arrou, France
- Died: 30 March 1956 (aged 92); South Yarra, Victoria, Australia
- Known for: Founding the French Red Cross Society of Victoria

Charlotte Crivelli (born Marie Louise Charlotte Duret, 24 June 1863 – 30 March 1956) was a French Australian philanthropist who was known commonly as Madame Crivelli. She founded the French Red Cross Society of Victoria, which raised funds for the hospitals and other charities in Europe during World War I. She also established the After-War Relief Society for France after the signing of the Armistice, to raise money for rebuilding areas of France ravaged by war.

== Early life ==
Crivelli was born in Arrou (near Chartres) to Marie Joséphine Amiclia Amic (1837–1922) and Charles Duret (1829–1896). When Crivelli was 5 in 1896 the family moved to Melbourne. When Crivelli was in her late teens and early twenties, she studied arts and crafts with Berthe Mouchette, who was the founder of the Melbourne Alliance Française.

In 1887 Crivelli married Marcel Urbain Crivelli, and over the next two decades they had seven children.

== Career ==
In 1902, Crivelli became a committee member of the Victorian Alliance Française. As part of this committee, in her role as présidente-adjointe, she played an instrumental part in successfully agitating to have the French Consul Paul Maistre recalled after he attempted to change the Alliances to be more congruent with the Paris mother-house's goals and principles.

In 1915 Crivelli founded the French Red Cross Society of Victoria, which organised fundraising events and collection drives for the war. The society raised money for the Hôpital Australien de Paris which was established and run by her sister Suzanne Caubet, and Melbourne doctor Helen Sexton. People donated money and materials such as rolls of material, reams of paper, books, razors, and scissors. In the first year, Crivelli raised enough money to fund a ward of 40 beds in a hospital outside of Paris. By the end of the war the society has raised £207,233. After the signing of the Armistice, Crivelli established the After-War Relief Society for France.

In the last week of August 1921, Crivelli organised a French Week fundraising festival to coincide with the anniversary of the Battle of Amiens, which had taken place in Villers-Bretonneux. The festival raised £24,275 to assist Villers-Bretonneux to rebuild.

She was a member of the committee of the Little Green Shop at St. Vincent's Hospital and was president of their auxiliary.

== Later years and death ==
In her retirement she spent her time focussing on her interest in gardening and books. Crivelli died in her South Yarra home on 30 March 1956 at the age of 92.

== Awards ==
In 1947 she was awarded the French Legion of Honour, the highest French order of merit for her services to her country during the first and second world wars.

In 1937 Crivelli was awarded a bronze Médaille d'honneur de la famille française, by the Minister of Health of France. The award is to honour worthy and large families It is given by the French Government to encourage mothers to bring up their children to be good citizens, and given only to those who have carried out this task dutifully.
