= Millicent Armstrong =

Australian playwright, farmer and WWI war hero (1888–1973)

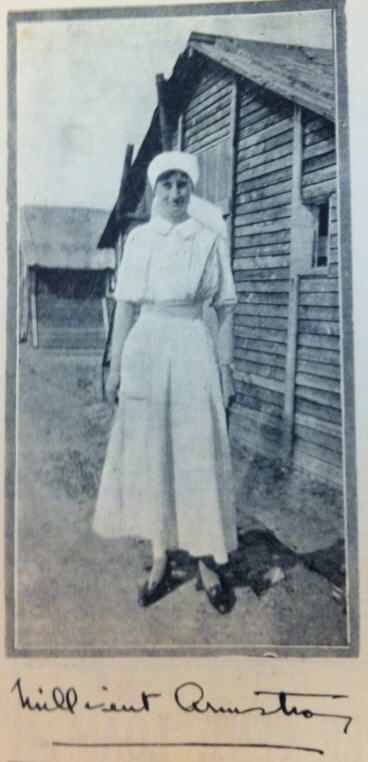
- Armstrong, c. 1916
- Born: Millicent Sylvia Armstrong; 1 May 1888; Waverley, New South Wales
- Died: 18 November 1973 (aged 85); Goulburn, New South Wales
- Education: Sydney University
- Occupations: Playwright, farmer
- Writing career
- Language: English, French
- Period: 1905–1910
- Notable awards: Croix de Guerre

Millicent Sylvia Armstrong (1 May 1888 – 18 November 1973) was an Australian playwright and farmer who wrote primarily about the experiences of country life in early 20th century Australia. She worked as an orderly in World War I in France, and was awarded the Croix de Guerre for bravery in rescuing wounded soldiers while under fire.

== Early life and education ==
Millicent Armstrong was born in Waverley, Sydney, on 1 May 1888. She was the fourth daughter of Irish-born William Harvey Armstrong and Tasmanian-born Jeanie (née Williams). She matriculated in French and Latin in 1905 and entered Sydney University to study arts, following her two older sisters, Ina Beatrice and Helen Daphne. She graduated BA with first-class honours in English in 1910. Millicent's sister, Helen, with whom she would collaborate on plays and a novel, graduated with first-class honours in French, English and German in 1902.

== War experiences ==
In 1914, Armstrong travelled to England to pursue a writing career but became involved in World War I work almost immediately. She served as a hospital orderly in both England and France: in England during the first two years of the war, and then in France with the Scottish Women's Hospitals for Foreign Service for the latter two and half years.

She was awarded the Croix de Guerre for bravery in rescuing wounded soldiers while under fire.

It was during her time as a nurse at the Hospital Auxiliaire d'Armee No. 30 in France that, as she said: "I first tried my hand on plays – partly in French and partly in English, acted in one or other of the wards by the staff and any of the blesses who were well enough to join in the fun, for the amusement of the rest of the hospital. Never were audiences more kindly and easy to entertain! Anything went down with them, from wildest melodrama to pantomime and variety shows."

== Life as a farmer ==
In 1919, after the war, Armstrong returned to Australia. In 1921, she took up a soldier settlement block of land in Clear Hills, Gunning, New South Wales. The farm, which was 1028 acres, had previously belonged to her sister Ina's husband. It adjoined land later acquired by her sister, Helen. They farmed vegetables, flowers, pigs and wool together but faced indebtedness and many of the difficulties that others who had acquired land through the Soldier Settlement scheme faced.

After Helen's death in 1939, Millicent became a grazier in Kirkdale, Yarra, near Goulburn. By 1953, she was living in the city of Goulburn where she died in 1973.

== Writing career ==
Millicent Armstrong wrote plays and an unpublished novel, Five Pretty Sisters, with her sister, Helen. None of her wartime writing survives, but the plays she wrote in Australia were well received and prize-winning. Eleven plays survive and some have been republished in collections.

Armstrong's first post-war play was Fire, which won third prize in the Sydney Daily Telegraph playwriting competition in 1923.

In the same year, Drought, a play about a Macedonian immigrant farmer committing suicide just before a destructive drought ends, won the Rupert Brooke Prize, which had been instituted in 1919 by the Old Collegians Association of the Presbyterian Ladies' College of Melbourne in commemoration of peace. The play was chosen from over 100 submissions, winning the award for the best one act play written by an Australian or New Zealander. It was produced at the Playhouse, Melbourne, in June 1924. In 1934, it was one of three prize-winners in the International One-Act Play Theatre's 1934 competition and was produced at St Martin's Theatre, London on 3 June 1934. Drought was also broadcast from London by the BBC on 11 December 1934 and 3KZ (Melbourne) 10 May 1938. The play was published in London by Harrap, 1934: Prize One Act Plays and then in a collection of Armstrong's plays, Plays in One Act in 1958.

Also published in Plays in One Act are Thomas, first produced by the Armidale Theatre Club, Armidale, New South Wales in 1959; and Penny Dreadful which was first produced by the Diamond Valley Drama Group at the Arrow Theatre, Melbourne, 8 August 1961.

The play At Dusk was published in the 1937 collection Best Australian One-Act Plays, edited by Tom Inglis-Moore and William Moore. A sinisterly dramatic play about two sisters who live in the Australian bush, one of whom dies of fright after encountering a vicious man from her past, is described as "plunder[ing] the 'frontier mentality' which usually saw women scripted as saviours rather than victims of intolerably discriminatory situations." At Dusk had a rich performance history and was produced by the Sydney Drama Society on 23 July 1938, by the Sydney Players' Club in 1939, the Maryborough Arts Society (5 June 1954) and at the Napier Street Theatre, South Melbourne, c. 1993. The play was toured by Phoenix Productions in 1956 (dir. Musgrave Horner), among other productions.

Armstrong's other plays include:

- The Moon Sets (1958)
- Goblin Gold (c. 1938)
- Windward (unknown date)
- Nina (c. 1936)

The Unfortunate Archibalds (1931) was written with Millicent's sister Helen.

== See also ==
- Other notable women volunteers in the Scottish Women's Hospitals for Foreign Service
- Women in World War I
- Australian women in World War I
- The Serbian campaign (1914–1915)
