= Jane Bell (nurse) =

Scotland-born Australian nurse and midwife (1873–1959)

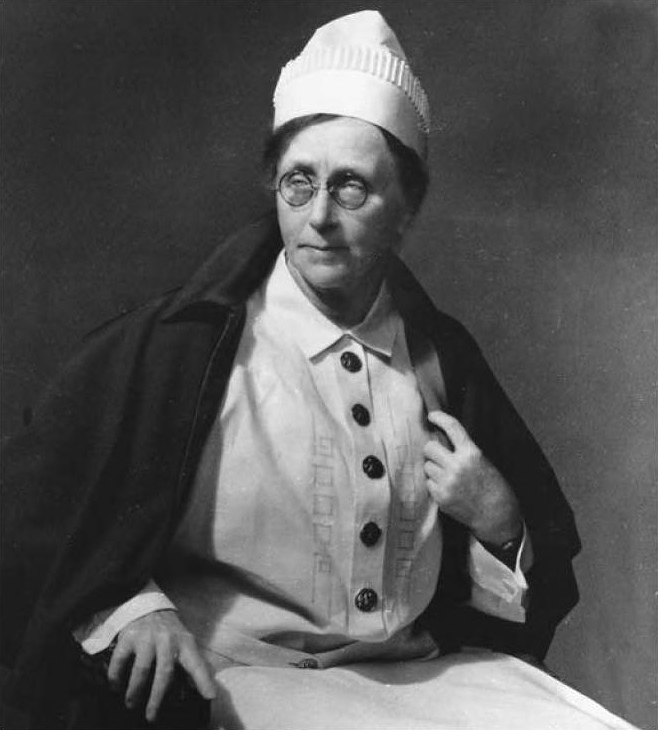
- Born: 16 March 1873; Middlebie, Scotland
- Died: 6 August 1959 (aged 86); Royal Melbourne Hospital, Melbourne, Victoria, Australia
- Occupation: matron

Jane Bell OBE (1873–1959) was a Scotland-born Australian nurse and midwife. She is best known for her work with Australian Imperial Force (AIF) field hospitals in Egypt in World War I, and for her advocacy for the nursing profession.

== Career ==
Bell was born on 16 March 1873 in Middlebie, a farm in Scotland. After the death of both her parents and four of her siblings from tuberculosis Bell migrated to Sydney with her remaining siblings (two sisters and a brother) and was assisted in doing so by her family's Presbyterian parish. The children arrived in Sydney in 1886 where she trained as a nurse at Royal Prince Alfred Hospital in Sydney. In 1899 she was a founding member of the Australasian Trained Nurses' Association. Following the completion of her training Bell was appointed Matron of the Bundaberg Hospital in 1903.

Bell moved to London in 1906, where she trained in midwifery at the then-named Queen Charlotte's Hospital where she was employed as deputy superintendent of nursing.

She returned to Australia in 1910 to take up an appointment as the matron of the Melbourne Hospital where she would work until 1934. Her work there as interrupted when, following the outbreak of World War I, in 1914, she was appointed principal matron of the First Australian General Hospital in Egypt. Upon arrival she was immediately embroiled in a conflict with 'the military establishment' and was asked to return to Australia. A later inquiry into the administration hospital vindicated her stand and paved the way for the 1916 reorganisation of the Australian Army Medical and Nursing Services.

As matron at the Melbourne Hospital she created the position of "theatre sister" in 1912 (replacing male orderlies), established a nurses preliminary training school in 1927 and created the first" special diet kitchen' in an Australian hospital in 1929.

Throughout her career Bell campaigned for recognition of the importance of nursing and achieved many reforms in working conditions and training. She aimed to "eliminate the perception of nurses as ladies with lamps, rather than trained professionals". In her career Bell achieved many reforms in working conditions and training.

== Awards and honours ==
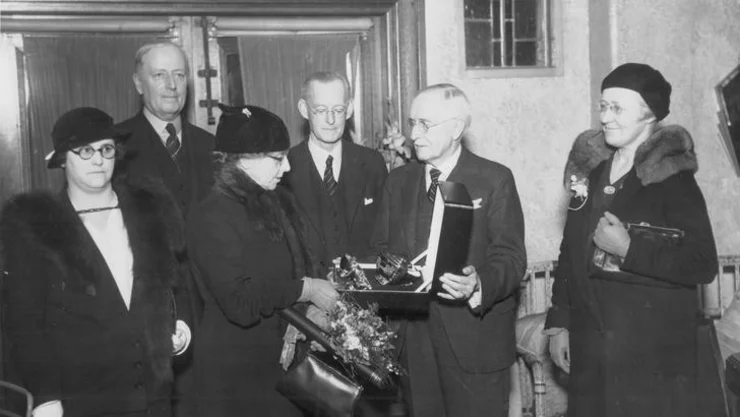
Matron Jane Bell has given a silver tea set when she retired

She was awarded the Officer of the Order of the British Empire in the 1944 New Year Honours in recognition of her work as president of the Royal Victoria College of Nursing.

In 2013 she was inducted to the Victorian Honour Roll of Women as a change agent.

== Death and legacy ==
Bell died on 6 August 1959 at the Royal Melbourne Hospital in Parkville, Victoria.

There is a book published about Bell: Williams, Jennifer Ann & Goodman, R. D. (Robert Douglas), 1915- (1988). Jane Bell OBE (1873-1959) Lady Superintendent, the Royal Melbourne Hospital (1910-1934). Spectrum.

"Jane Bell Lane" located in the Queen Victoria Village retail precinct in Melbourne is named in her honour. In 2011 her great nephew donated her medals and OBE to the Royal Melbourne Hospital.
