= Cecilia John =

Australian singer, feminist and pacifist (1877–1955)

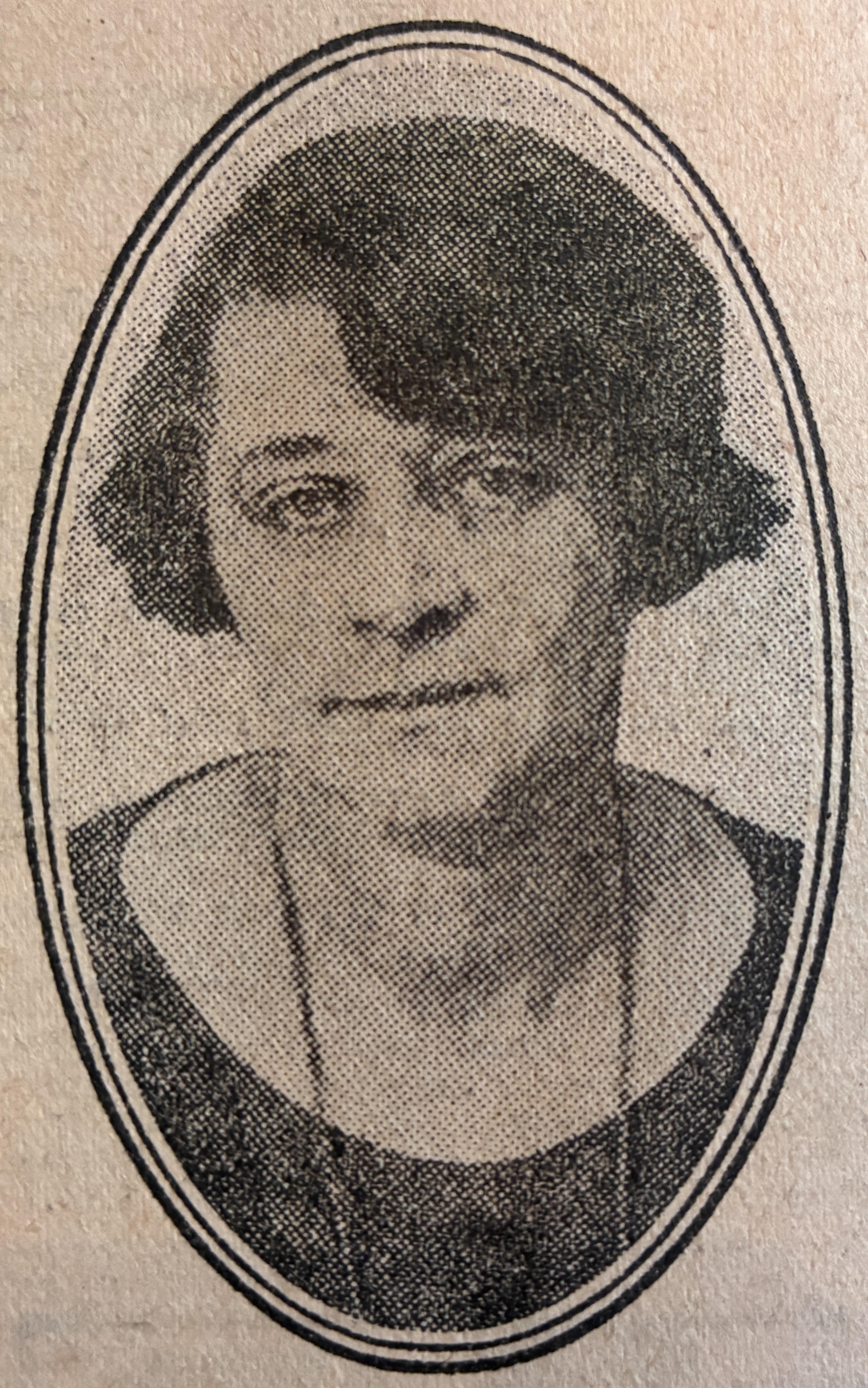
- Born: 5 November 1877; Hobart, Tasmania, Australia
- Died: 28 May 1955 (aged 77); Godalming, Surrey, England
- Occupations: Social reformer, singer, educator

Cecilia Annie John (5 November 1877 – 28 May 1955) was an Australian social activist, peace campaigner, and musician.

== Early life ==
John was born on 5 November 1877 in Hobart, Tasmania to parents who were immigrants from Wales. She left her parents' home while young and moved to Melbourne to study music. She was a contralto and performed with the Metropolitan Liedertafel, the Royal Melbourne Philharmonic Society, and the German Opera Company. John also became an expert in the field of raising poultry, having started her own poultry farm at Deepdene in order to finance her musical education.

== Career ==
Joining the Collins Street Independent Church, John became interested in social questions and adopted feminist and anti-conscriptionist views that were radical for the time. She was a friend of Vida Goldstein and assisted in her attempt to enter Parliament in 1913, and was a member of the anti-conscription Australian Freedom League. When Australian Prime Minister Billy Hughes proposed compulsory military service in order to provide reinforcements for the depleted Australian Imperial Force, John and other anti-war feminists reacted by forming the Women's Peace Army (WPA), which worked to oppose both conscription and militarism. John was especially noted for singing at WPA events, leading authorities to ban public performances of her signature song I Didn't Raise My Boy to Be a Soldier; a ban that John proceeded to ignore.

In 1919, John was among the three Australians who attended a postwar conference in Zurich, along with Vida Goldstein and Eleanor May Moore. Following the war, John became interested in the Dalcroze Eurhythmic style of dance, and in 1921 moved permanently to London to study it further. In 1932 she became the principal at the London School of Dalcroze Eurhythmics and continuing to hold that position until her death in 1955. John was a strong supporter of the Save the Children Fund and visited Australia in 1923 and 1927 to raise funds to ease the plight of thousands of Armenian refugees in Syria. During her 1927 visit she also examined students of Dalcroze Eurhythmics. Together with her friends and fellow activists Goldstein and Ina Higgins, John helped to establish the Rural Women's Industries Co-operative Women's farm in Mordialloc, Victoria.

== Later years and death ==
John died on 28 May 1955 in Godalming, Surrey, England. John Close, in the Canberra suburb of Gilmore, is named in her honour.
