= Hôpital Australien de Paris =

Military hospital in Auteuil, France, 1915

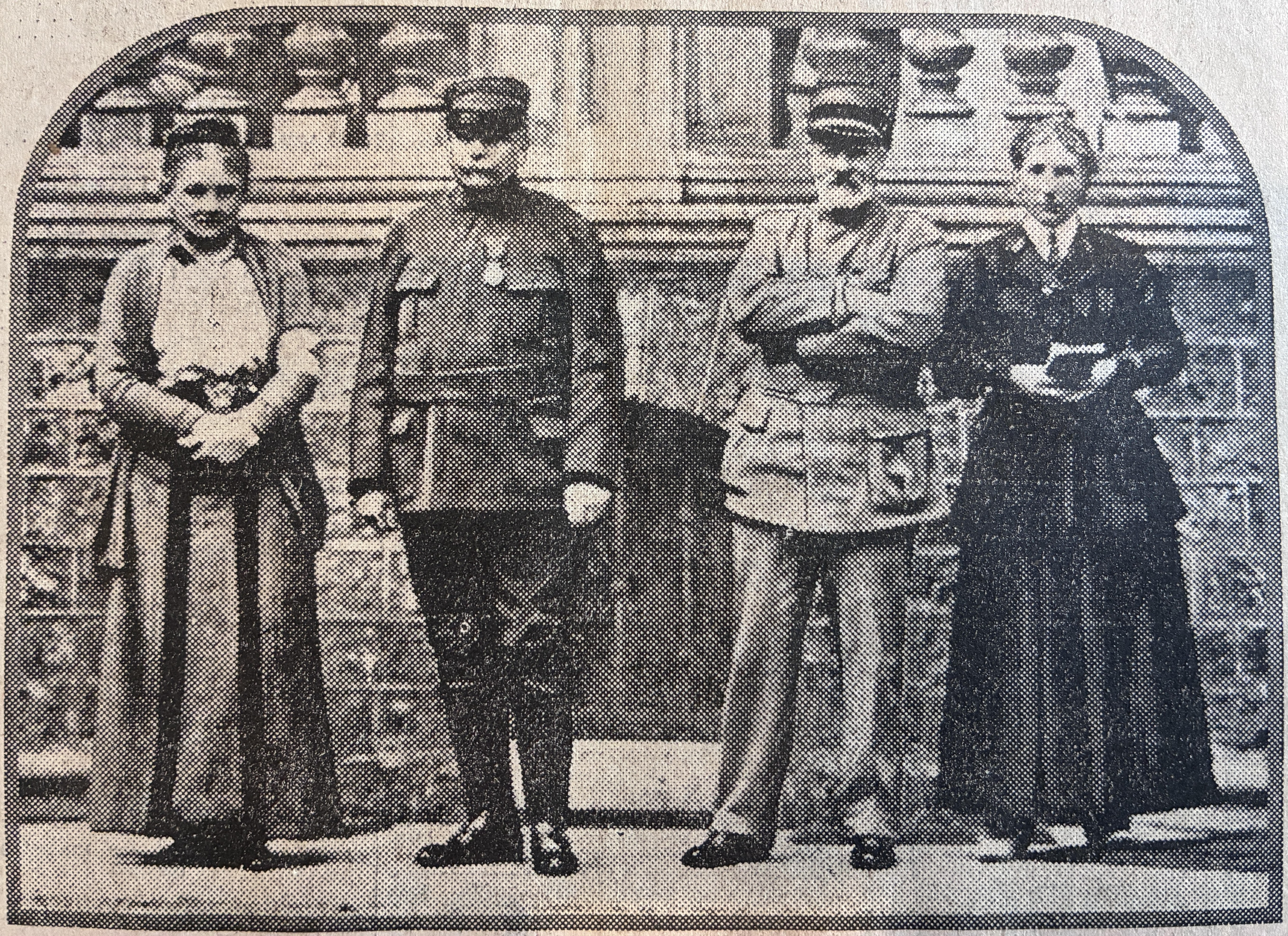
- Staff of the Hôpital Australien de Paris

Geography
- Location: 46 Rue du Dr Blanche, Auteuil, France

Organisation
- Type: World War I Military
- Network: French Army

Services
- Beds: 21-25

History
- Opened: 4 August 1915
- Closed: 18 December 1915

Links
- Lists: Hospitals in France

The Hôpital Australien de Paris, also known as the Australian Hospital in Paris, was a French military hospital founded and staffed predominantly by Australian women during World War I.

== History ==
After war broke out in 1914, Helen Sexton, who was travelling in England, offered her surgical services to the Royal Army Medical Corps (RAMC). She offered to pay all of her expenses. However, the RAMC refused to enlist her. Sexton returned to Australia on the RMS Moldavia, arriving in early February 1915. Sexton approached the Australian Government, and offered to equip a hospital unit and staff it with women. The government declined her offer. They only allowed unmarried, trained nurses to enlist. They put a notice in the newspapers stating that women doctors would not be accepted for active service. She then spent four months gathering resources such as medical equipment and clothing, and raising money. Sexton recruited staff which included a nurse Susan Smith and her two daughters Alison and Lorna, who worked as cooks, and nurses Constance Blackwood, Florence Inglis, and Dora Wilson. In France they were joined by fellow Australians, Audrey and Eileen Chomley.

A key figure in the establishment, supply and management of the hospital, was Suzanne Caubet, who was a senior volunteer administrator, and director of the French Red Cross at the Buffon Centre, which adjoined the Military hospital Val de Grace. Caubet was born in France, and raised in Melbourne. Her younger sister, Charlotte Crivelli, was the founder of the French Red Cross Society of Victoria, which was involved in fundraising for the hospital. The French Military assigned an administrator M. de Riensi, to manage the military matters. Sexton was assigned the Medical Officer in Charge, and the Military provided three male consulting surgeons.

When Rene G. Crivelli, Charlotte Crivelli's son, and Suzanne Caubet's nephew, was wounded while serving in a French military unit, he was treated by Sexton at the Hôpital Australien de Paris.

== Closure ==
The hospital closed in December 1915, and Sexton and Blackwood transferred to the Buffon military hospital, Val de Grace, where Sexton worked as a surgeon, and Blackwood as a nurse.

== Recognition ==
In 1919, Sexton, Mrs R. O Blackwood, and Mrs William Smith were each awarded a gold Médaille de la Reconnaissance française or Medal of French Gratitude for their work at the hospital, and Charlotte Crivelli was awarded a silver Médaille de la Reconnaissance française for her fundraising efforts.
