= Middlebie =

Village in Scotland, United Kingdom

Coordinates: 55.07°N 03.23°W

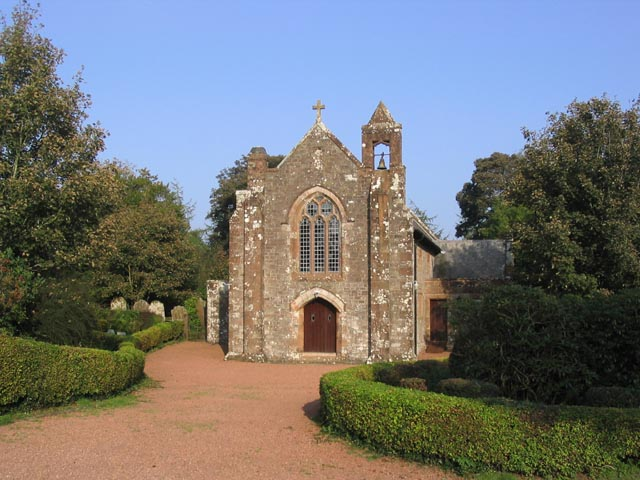
Middlebie Church

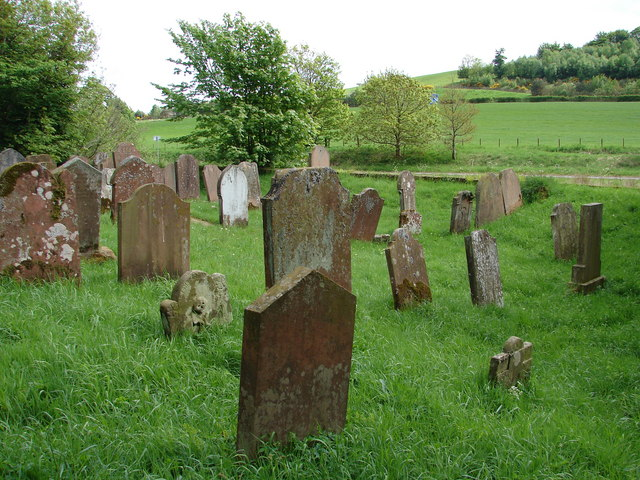
Pennersaugh Graveyard

Middlebie is a hamlet and parish in the historic county of Dumfriesshire in Dumfries and Galloway, south-west Scotland. It is approximately 2 miles (3.2 km) east of Ecclefechan, and 6 miles (9.7 km) north-east of Annan, on the banks of the Middlebie Burn.

Middlebie Parish consists of the ancient parishes of Middlebie, Pennersax (Pennersaughs) and Carruthers, united in 1609. Middlebie was the seat of a Presbytery from some time after the Reformation until 1743. It was then divided to form the Presbyteries of Langholm and Annan. Middlebie parish is now in the Presbytery of Annandale & Eskdale. It is bounded by the parishes of Tundergarth, Langholm, Canonbie, Half Morton, Kirkpatrick Fleming, Annan and Hoddam.

The villages of Eaglesfield, Middlebie and Waterbeck lie within the parish, with Kirtlebridge on its southern boundary. Eaglesfield and Hottsbridge by Waterbeck still have primary schools. The school at Middlebie closed in 1972, nearly a hundred years after it opened. The Eaglesfield building is now just over a hundred years old. The former school in Waterbeck village, built about 1900, is now the public hall. Eaglesfield's public hall was built in 1892–3. Middlebie's old hall (a wooden ex-army building purchased in 1928) was demolished and a new one built in 2001.

The West Coast Main Line railway runs through the parish from London to Glasgow. Previously the Caledonian Railway, the line formerly had a station at Kirtlebridge, where the writer Thomas Carlyle would alight before walking up to his parents farm at Scotsbrig above Middlebie. From Kirtlebridge the Solway Junction Railway ran down to Annan and across by the Solway viaduct to Cumbria. It was built to transport iron ore to the Lanarkshire steelworks.

In 1841 the population of the parish was 2,154 and about sixty of these people were handloom weavers. There were inns and shops and the Lime Works Blacketridge. Tradesmen listed in 1841 include joiners, shoemakers, tailors, cloggers, masons, millers, carters, grooms, gardeners, dressmakers, straw-hat makers, etc. Today, only Eaglesfield still has a general store and post office. In 1841, as well as 73 farmers, 314 people were employed as agricultural labourers and 60 more as servants.

Notable people from Middlebie include Matron Jane Bell who was sent as an orphan to Australia and William Brown (1888–1975), professor of plant pathology and head of the botany department at Imperial College of Science and Technology.
