= Australian Freedom League =

The Australian Freedom League (AFL) was an anti-conscription organisation founded in Australia in 1912. Growing out of an earlier organisation called the "Anti-Military Service League", it was initially based in Adelaide, although by 1914 there were branches in every state except Western Australia. It was active in producing pamphlets and other material to promote its views that military training would have a negative and corrupting effect on young men and boys.
