= Women's Compulsory Service Petition League =

The Women's Compulsory Service Petition League, originally the Women's Compulsory and All Loyal League and the Women's Compulsory Service League was a pro-conscription organisation active in Brisbane during the First World War. Formed primarily by the female relatives of soldiers who had enlisted and were fighting or had been killed in action, they tried to persuade men to enlist, and they campaigned for the immediate introduction of the conscription of all able-bodied men in order to reinforce the Australian Imperial Force (AIF) fighting in France. Their main methods of applying pressure were through organising petitions, and holding public meetings. The League was in strident opposition to organisations such as the Women's Peace Army, who either opposed conscription or were philosophically opposed to war altogether.
