= HMHS Gloucester Castle =

British steam ship

Coordinates: 10°5′S 5°0′W

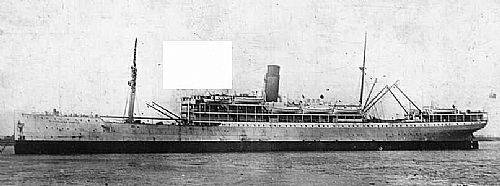
- Gloucester Castle

History

United Kingdom
- Operator: Union-Castle Line (1911—1914; 1919—1942 Royal Navy (1914—1919)
- Port of registry: London
- Builder: Fairfields S&E, Glasgow
- Yard number: 478
- Launched: 13 May 1911
- Completed: August 1911
- Fate: Sunk by auxiliary cruiser Michel on 15 July 1942

General characteristics
- Tonnage: 7,999 GRT
- Length: 452.7 ft (138.0 m)
- Beam: 56.2 ft (17.1 m)
- Draught: 30.7 ft (9.4 m)
- Propulsion: Steam, quadruple expansion engines, 722 nhp
- Speed: 13 knots (24 km/h)

HMHS Gloucester Castle (His Majesty's Hospital Ship) was a steam ship originally built for the Union-Castle Line, but requisitioned for use as a British hospital ship during the First World War. On 30 March 1917 she was torpedoed by German U-boat UB-32. She was, however, salvaged, and returned to civilian service after the war. She was sunk by the German commerce raider Michel in 1942 off Ascension Island in the South Atlantic.

== History ==
In the First World War Gloucester Castle was hired to transport troops of the British Expeditionary Force from 6 August 1914 to 25 May 1915. From 26 May onwards she served as a hospital ship. She was torpedoed off the Isle of Wight by German U-boat UB-32 (Kapitänleutnant Max Viebeg) on 30 March 1917. Three died during the transfer of crew and wounded but she was able to be towed back to port after two weeks.

After the war she was returned to her owners on 9 September 1919 for service on the intermediate routes and later served on the round-Africa service, earning the nickname 'Go Slowster Castle' because of her inadequate speed.

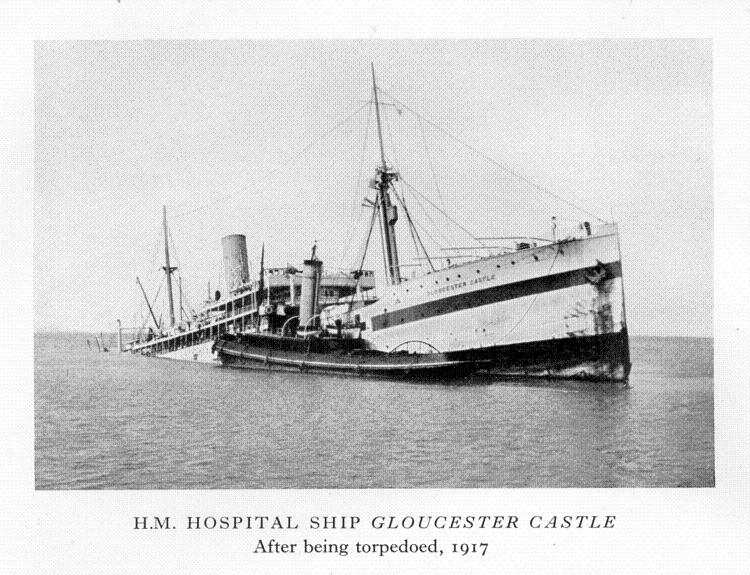

In the Second World War she remained in civilian service as a passenger and general cargo liner. On 15 July 1942, off the coast of Angola, she was intercepted by the German auxiliary cruiser Michel. Michel's commander KzS Helmuth von Ruckteschell chose to attack after dark without warning. The first shells from Michel destroyed the bridge and radio room and, consequently, no S.O.S. was transmitted. The ship sank with 93 killed, including the Master, Herbert H. Rose, six woman passengers, and two children. The remaining 61 survivors were picked up by the Michel and interned at Yokohama, Japan. After repatriation, the survivors reported the conditions under which they were forced to work and live.

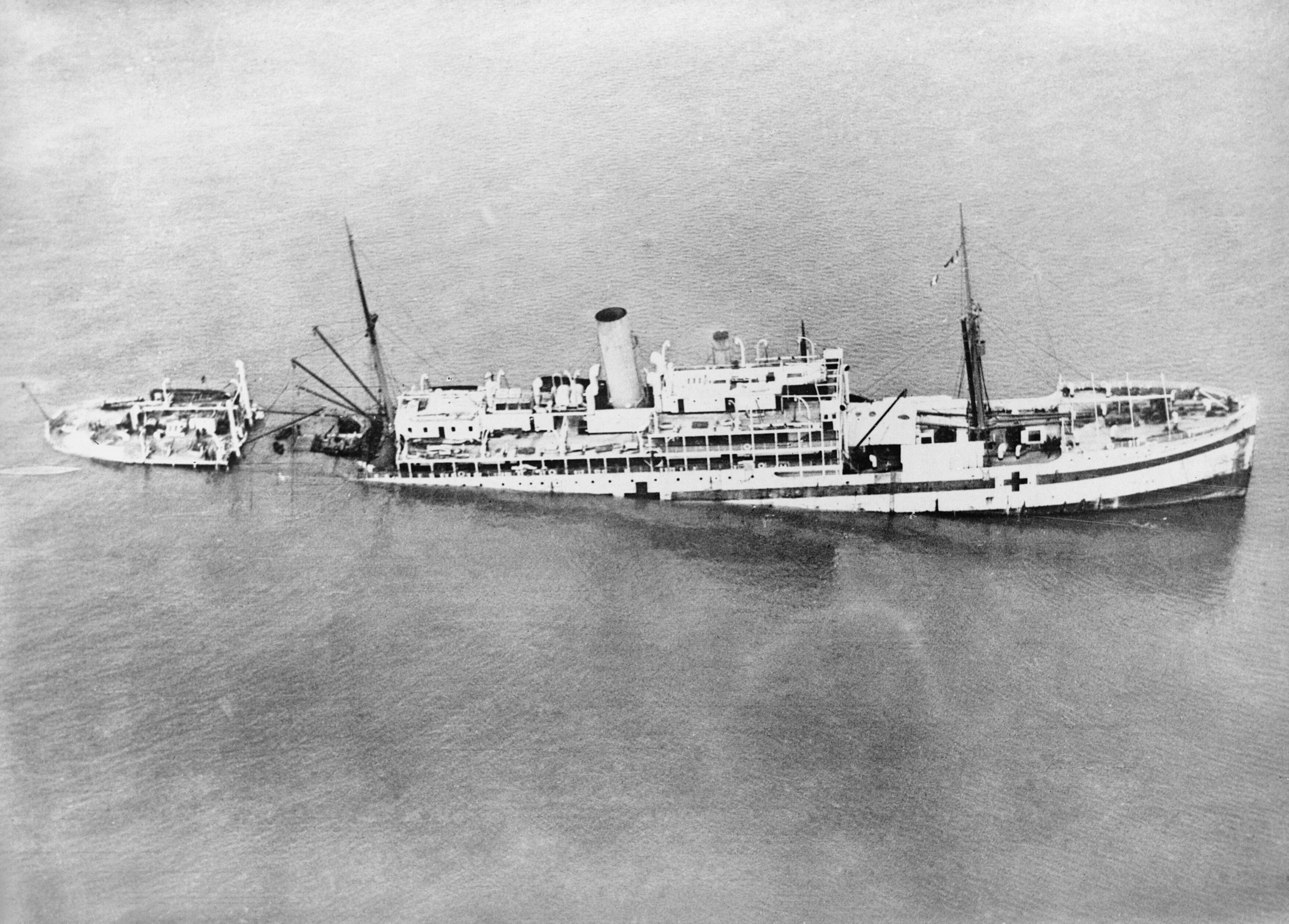
The hospital ship Gloucester Castle down by the stern after being torpedoed by the U-boat UB-32 off the Isle of Wight, 31 March 1917.

== See also ==
- List of hospital ships sunk in World War I
