= Women's Peace Army =

- Women's Peace Army
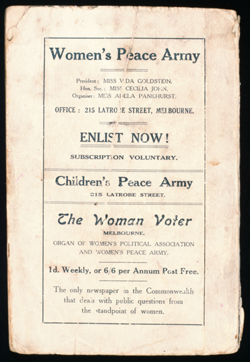
- WPA's advert
- Formation: 8 July 1915
- Founder and president: Vida Goldstein
- Affiliations: Women's Political Association of Victoria

Formed in Melbourne, Australia in 1915, the Women’s Peace Army was an Australian anti-war socialist movement that sought to mobilise and unite women, regardless of political or religious beliefs, in their opposition to war. Autonomous branches of the Women’s Peace Army were also established in the Australian cities of Sydney and Brisbane.

== Formation and aims ==
The Women's Peace Army was formed in Melbourne, Victoria, Australia on 8 July 1915 during a meeting of the Women’s Political Association presided by Vida Goldstein, a noted suffragist and pacifist. The Women's Peace Army's motto was "We war against war" and their flag utilised the colours of the suffragette movement - purple (dignity), green (hope) and white (purity).

The movement opposed war and by association conscription, proclaiming that governments should seek a mandate from the people, such as a referendum, before entering into a war.

The movement actively held regular public meetings to recruit new members. Other activities included staging peace demonstrations and petitioning members of parliament.

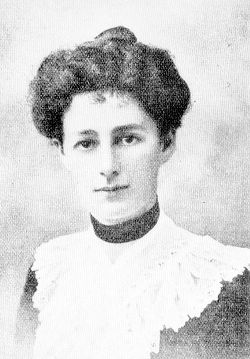
Vida Goldstein, a noted suffragist and pacifist

New members were required to sign a pledge dedicating themselves to the principles of the Women's Peace Army -

"I believe that war is a degradation of motherhood, an economic futility, and a crime against civilisation and humanity. I therefore, pledge myself to active service in the cause of peace by working against compulsory military training and every form of militarism. Further, I solemnly pledge myself to face uninchingly adverse criticism, calumny, and persecution for my faith that LOVE and JUSTICE alone will bring peace to the world." (Membership booklet for the Women's Peace Army, Queensland branch)

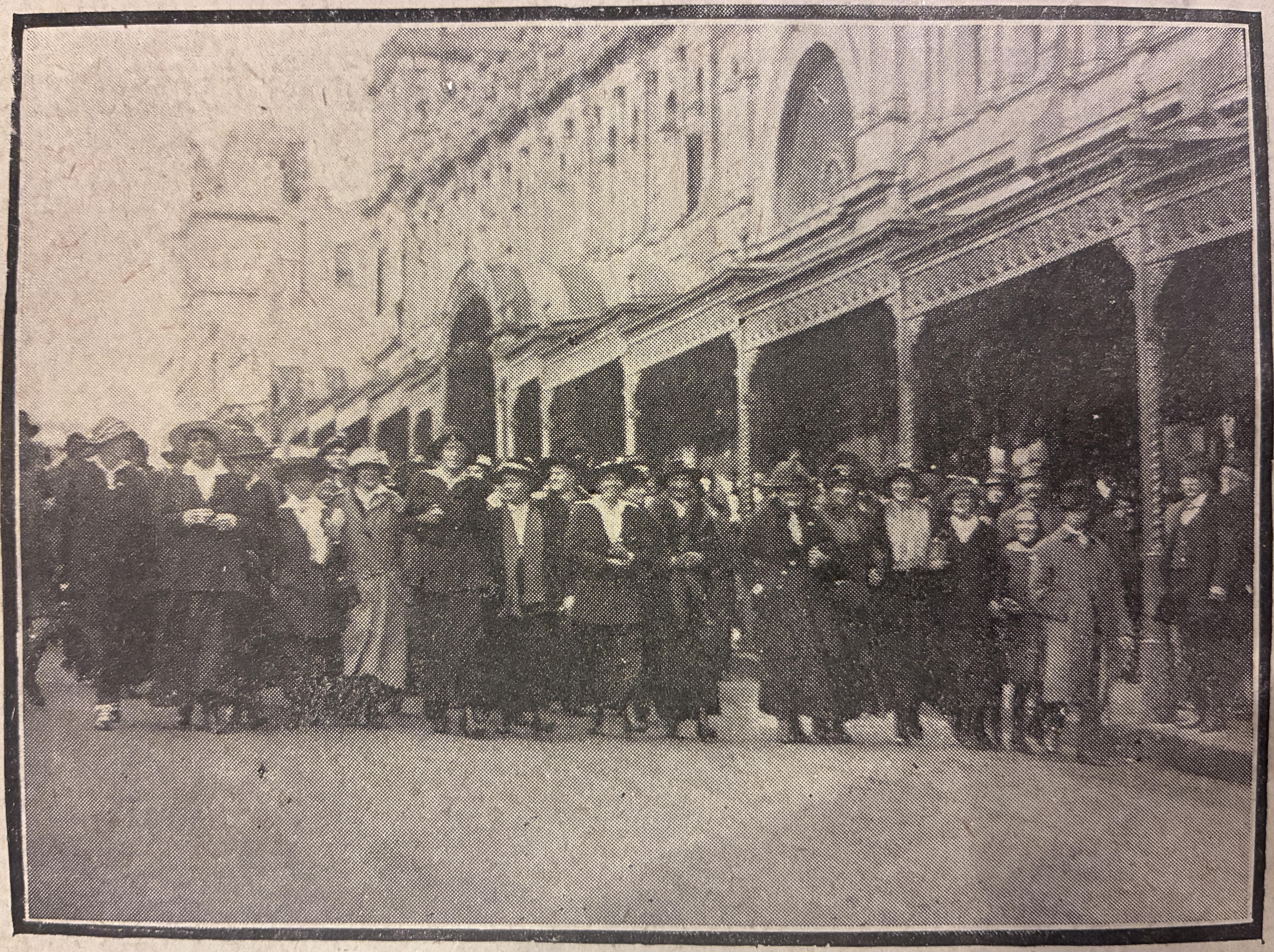
Women's Peace Army demonstration, Spring Street, Melbourne, 23 August 1917

There was support for anti-war movements driven by the war-related inflation which saw food shortages largely felt by the working classes. This led to violent demonstrations and food riots in 1917 in Melbourne. On 22 August 1917, the Women's Peace Army led hundreds of women on a march to Parliament House demanding "we want food and fair play". With headlines such as "Women Fight Police" the media reported protestors attacking police with umbrellas and their hands, and the police drawing their batons and handcuffs. The police arrested five people including Adela Pankhurst, and Elizabeth Wallace. A former suffragette Pankhurst was the daughter of British activist Emmeline Pankhurst, and after a rift formed between mother and daughter, Pankhurst was sent to live in Australia.

== Queensland branch ==
The Queensland branch of the Women's Peace Army was established at a meeting in Brisbane on 16 November 1915. The meeting was attended by Melbourne delegates Adela Pankhurst and Cecilia John, who both gave speeches. Clio Jensen was later elected president of the Queensland branch, with Margaret Thorp as secretary/treasurer and seasoned suffragist Emma Miller sharing the position of vice-president with Mabel Lane. A later advert (above) described Parkhurst as "Organiser".

During one meeting at Brisbane's Centennial Hall, army authorities notified the organisers that they would arrest anyone who sang the anti-war song "I Didn't Raise My Son to Be a Soldier", an offence under the War Precautions Act. In defiance, copies of the song sheet were distributed at the meeting with the audience singing the banned song in unity. No arrests were made.
