= List of Australian women's organisations during World War II =

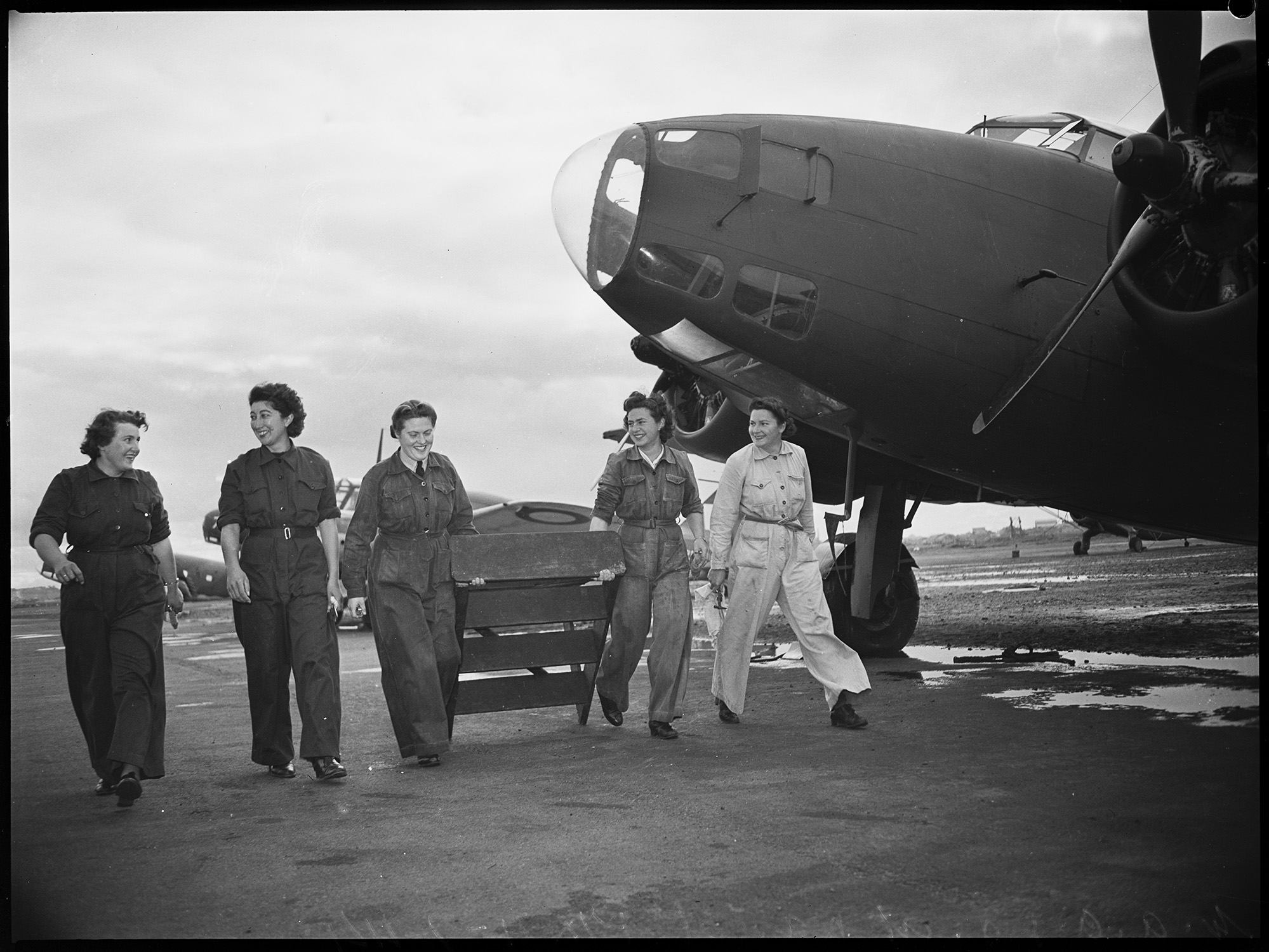
Members of the Women's Auxiliary Australian Air Force in 1944

During the first years of World War II hundreds of voluntary women's auxiliary and paramilitary organisations were established in Australia. Members of these organisations wore uniforms that were similar to those of the Australian military, adopted military-style ranks and regularly met for training sessions. The organisations pre-dated the establishment of women's branches of the military, which began to be formed in mid-1940.

== Official ==
- Australian Women's Army Service
- Australian Women's Land Army
- Women's Auxiliary Australian Air Force
- Royal Australian Naval Nursing Service
- Women's Royal Australian Naval Service

== Volunteer ==
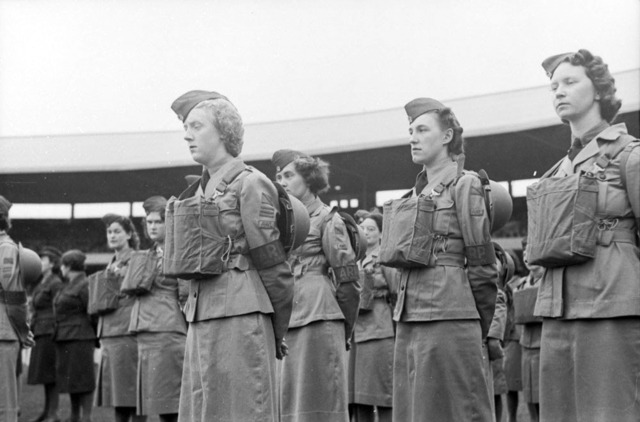
Members of the Australian Women's Legion during a 1941 parade at the Melbourne Cricket Ground

- Australian Women's Legion
- Red Cross Link
- Women's Air Training Corps
- Women's Australian National Services
- Women's Auxiliary Service (Burma)
- Women's Auxiliary Transport Service
- Women's Emergency Signalling Corps
- Women's Flying Club
- Women's National Emergency Legion.
- Women's Reserve Emergency Naval Service
- Women's Reserve Emergency Naval Service, Social Service Institute
- Women's Transport Corps
- Women's Cavalry Corps

== See also ==
- Australian women during World War II
