= Clare Stevenson =

Australian military officer (1903–1988)

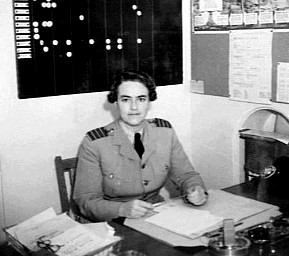
- Group Officer Clare Stevenson, RAAF Headquarters, 1944
- Nickname: "Steve"
- Born: 18 July 1903; Wangaratta, Victoria
- Died: 22 October 1988 (aged 85) Mona Vale, New South Wales
- Allegiance: Australia
- Service/branch: Royal Australian Air Force
- Service years: 1941–1946
- Rank: Group Officer
- Commands: Women's Auxiliary Australian Air Force
- Conflicts: World War II
- Awards: Member of the Order of Australia; Member of the Order of the British Empire
- Other work: Executive, Berlei; Founder President, Carers NSW

Clare Grant Stevenson, AM, MBE (18 July 1903 – 22 October 1988) was the inaugural Director of the Women's Auxiliary Australian Air Force (WAAAF), from May 1941 to March 1946. She was described in 2001 as "the most significant woman in the history of the Air Force". Formed as a branch of the Royal Australian Air Force (RAAF) in March 1941, the WAAAF was the first and largest uniformed women's service in Australia during World War II, numbering more than 18,000 members by late 1944 and making up over thirty per cent of RAAF ground staff.

Born and educated in Victoria, Stevenson was an executive with the Berlei company when she was appointed Director WAAAF. Initially ranked squadron officer, she rose to become group officer by April 1942. Stevenson resumed her civilian career following her discharge from the Air Force in 1946. Long active in adult education and social welfare, she helped form aid organisations including the Carers Association of New South Wales (now Carers NSW) after retiring from Berlei in 1960. Stevenson was appointed a Member of the Order of the British Empire and a Member of the Order of Australia for her services to the community and to female veterans.

== Education and early career ==
Born on 18 July 1903 in Wangaratta, Victoria, Clare Grant Stevenson was the fifth of six children of Robert Logan Grant Stevenson and his wife Ada Pollie (née Griffiths). When Clare was four her family moved to Essendon, where she attended Winstow Girls' Grammar School and Essendon High School, completing her intermediate and leaving certificates. In 1922, she entered the Faculty of Science at the University of Melbourne, but switched to education after failing chemistry in her final year. Stevenson was a hockey blue and was active in several campus groups, including the Students' Representative Council and the Science Club. She became president of the Committee of Melbourne University Women, and graduated in 1925 with a Diploma of Education.

As a young university student, Stevenson had exhibited a preparedness to challenge rules. Standing in the Registrar's Office during the matriculation ceremony in 1921, and asked to vow to 'obey the rules so far as they apply to me', Stevenson had instead said 'so far as they appeal to me'.

— Despina Tramoundanis, "The WAAAF at War"

Stevenson began her working career with the YWCA in 1926. A strong advocate for continuing education, during her first two years with the association she organised night classes for workers in Sydney. She served as General Secretary of the Rockhampton, Queensland, branch of the YWCA from 1929 to 1931. In 1932, she took up a position as a training and research officer at Berlei, and from 1935 to 1939 represented the company in London as a senior executive. Stevenson had returned to Australia and was based in Sydney, supervising Berlei's product research and the training of sales staff, at the outbreak of World War II.

== Director WAAAF ==
=== Appointment ===
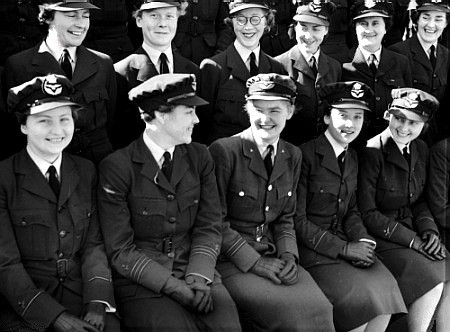
Wing Officer Stevenson (front, second left) with Flight Officer Sybil-Jean Burnett (front, centre) and staff at No. 1 WAAAF Depot, Victoria, August 1941

Late in 1940, Stevenson was nominated to be the first director of the planned Women's Auxiliary Australian Air Force (WAAAF). Although keen to support the war effort in some capacity, she refused owing to the administrative and social obstacles she foresaw in the role; her appointment went ahead regardless on 21 May 1941. The Air Member for Personnel, Air Vice Marshal Henry Wrigley, had selected Stevenson on the basis of her management background, academic qualifications and knowledge of women's organisations, and because she was not a "socialite". Despite her misgivings, Stevenson felt she had no choice but to accept the appointment, which took effect on 9 June.

Established on 25 March 1941 in response to lobbying by women wanting to serve in the war, and to free more male ground crew for overseas postings, the WAAAF was the first uniformed women's branch of an armed service in Australia, predating similar organisations in the Army and Navy. Fewer than two hundred personnel had been recruited when Stevenson became Director in June; this number would grow to around a thousand by the end of the year.

For the first three months of its existence the WAAAF had been under the temporary command of Flight Officer Mary Bell, wife of an RAAF group captain and former Australian Commandant of the Women's Air Training Corps, an organisation of female pilots and ground staff that had been formed in 1939 and had been providing voluntary support to the Air Force. Bell chose to resign on learning of Stevenson's appointment, rather than stay on as deputy director and report to someone from outside the service fraternity; she later rejoined at Wrigley's request, on the condition that she would receive no promotion higher than flight officer.

=== Early challenges ===
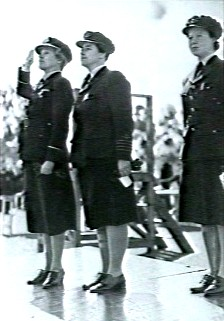
Group Officer Stevenson (centre) with honorary Air Commandant of the WAAAF, Lady (Zara) Gowrie (left), and the Deputy Director WAAAF, Squadron Officer Miller (right), Melbourne, November 1942

In her role as Director, Stevenson was responsible for training, morale and welfare of all WAAAF staff. Philosophically committed to equal opportunity regardless of gender and social background, from the outset she had to deal with discrimination by government authorities, many of whom had been against the creation of such a service. The Minister for Defence, Harold Thorby, declared that "aviation takes women out of their natural environment, the home and the training of the family", and several senior Air Force officers, including the man later known as the "Father of the RAAF", Air Marshal Richard Williams, and the Director of Personnel Services, Group Captain Joe Hewitt, also fought the proposal. The Chief of the Air Staff, Air Chief Marshal Sir Charles Burnett, a Royal Air Force commander who appreciated how the Women's Auxiliary Air Force (WAAF) had proved itself during the Battle of Britain in 1940, supported its establishment but lost some interest after his preferred choice as Director, his daughter Sybil-Jean, a serving WAAF officer, was ruled out. The Federal government decreed that WAAAF staff would be paid two-thirds of what a male doing the equivalent trade received. They could be arbitrarily dismissed for disciplinary offences without recourse to a court-martial, could only enter RAAF messes by invitation, and could expect to be saluted as a courtesy, not as a rule. Author Joyce Thomson contends that such conditions made the women "uniformed civilians". Women were at first enrolled for renewable twelve-month periods rather than enlisted as permanent staff; only in 1943 did the WAAAF become part of the Permanent Air Force.

Stevenson considered housing, uniforms, and recruit training to be her first priorities after taking up her appointment. On arriving at No. 1 WAAAF Depot in Malvern, Victoria, she was "shattered at the prison-like atmosphere of the place". She drew on her retail experience to organise the WAAAF and to design its uniform. Stevenson was promoted to wing officer on 1 October 1941, and group officer on 1 April 1942, which was to be the highest rank attained by a serving WAAAF member. She took an active interest in recruitment, her liberal social outlook evinced by her determination that single women with children should not be barred from entry to the WAAAF. To establish high standards, Stevenson personally interviewed all WAAAF officer trainees and briefed as many of them as possible before they were posted to a new job. She was quoted in the Adelaide Advertiser as saying, "When interviewing applicants, I always point out the hardships of the service, so that no one will come in on a rush of enthusiasm and regret it later." Stevenson also worked to maintain the morale of personnel, encouraging officers to attend group leadership courses and organise leisure and sporting activities for their staff. Colonel Sybil Irving, the head of the Australian Women's Army Service (AWAS), who observed first hand the WAAAF's training methods before large-scale AWAS recruitment commenced, later declared that Stevenson "did the most pertinent pioneering work" in gaining acceptance for women in the armed forces. For her part, Stevenson considered the role of Director "a difficult job and often a lonely one".

=== Later service ===
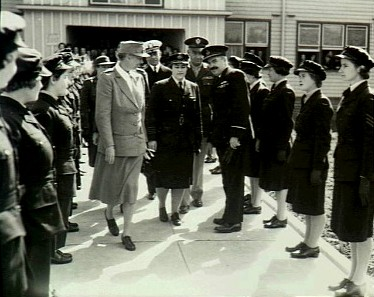
Stevenson (centre), flanked by the American First Lady, Eleanor Roosevelt (left), and Air Commodore Frank Lukis (right), September 1943

Early in 1943, a policy change was mooted to remove female officers from the technical musterings they had so far filled in the WAAAF, and substitute male officers in these roles. In opposing this, Stevenson went around the new Air Member for Personnel, Air Commodore Frank Lukis, and wrote directly to the Deputy Chief of the Air Staff, Air Commodore John McCauley. She told McCauley, "I contend that it is a waste of money and training to take women cipher officers, women from Signals (S4) and casualty ... when they have learnt their work and substitute these women by men who have to learn the job", and recommended that he direct the Air Member for Personnel to ensure that female officers continued to be employed in technical positions, and not simply for administration and welfare. McCauley agreed with Stevenson but Lukis appealed to Air Vice Marshal George Jones, the Chief of the Air Staff. Jones backed Lukis' authority, and the latter sent what Joyce Thomson described as a "stinging rebuke" to Stevenson, who was forced to apologise. In any event, women officers continued to be employed in technical positions as the WAAAF expanded over the next two years, peaking in strength at 18,667 members in October 1944. As of July that year, women comprised thirty-one per cent of Air Force ground staff and filled sixty-one trades, all previously occupied by men. By the end of the war around 27,000 women had served in the WAAAF.

In a July 1945 performance assessment, Joe Hewitt, now an air commodore and the Air Member for Personnel, wrote that Stevenson had "displayed great keenness in the performance of her duties and considerable resourcefulness in the solution of difficult problems". She continued to lead the WAAAF following the cessation of hostilities, retiring on medical grounds on 22 March 1946. Suffering reduced muscle function in her left arm and pain on the left side of her face and neck, she was diagnosed with brachial neuritis, traced to typhus, tetanus and smallpox injections received the previous May in preparation for a proposed visit to Manila that never eventuated. In her last annual address to the WAAAF as its director, Stevenson encouraged its members to make use of their service experience when they returned to civilian life:

These are the things we shall miss—the comradeship, the knowledge of a common aim, the feeling that one is not alone—they all make life in the WAAAF very different from life in the outside world ... We must find a common aim—not of winning a war and working to free our prisoners of war—but winning something for our district from an unenlightened council or a disinterested public ...

To The Sydney Morning Herald, she contended:

Waaafs also succeeded in making a few old truisms into lies ... It can never be said again that women cannot keep secrets, for in the WAAAF they did confidential work and kept top secrets. Nor can it be said that women cannot work and live together without squabbling or that women will not take orders from women.

Presented with a jewelled brooch as a farewell gift by her fellow officers, Stevenson asked that its value instead be put towards a scholarship for an ex-WAAAF member to study social work at the University of Sydney. The WAAAF itself, the first and largest of Australia's wartime women's services, was disbanded on 30 September 1946. It was succeeded in 1950 by a new organisation with a separate charter to the RAAF, the Women's Royal Australian Air Force (WRAAF). WRAAF members achieved a pay scale equal to the male service in 1972, and five years later were integrated with the RAAF.

== Post-war work and legacy ==
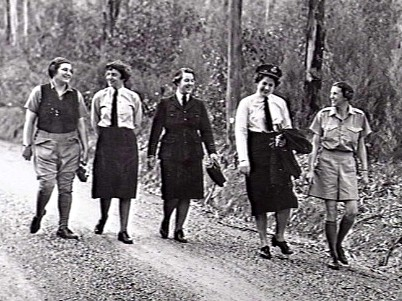
Stevenson (centre) and fellow WAAAFs on a country walk in Victoria, July 1944

After her discharge from the WAAAF, Stevenson resumed her career as a senior executive with Berlei, and remained with the company until her retirement in 1960. Parallel to her work at Berlei, she was a trustee of the Services Canteens Trust Fund in Melbourne, maintaining her links with the organisation for the next forty years. The fund administered surplus money from wartime service canteens for the families of former soldiers. Stevenson obtained a Bachelor of Education degree from the University of Melbourne in 1948. A founding patron of the Council of Ex-Servicewomen's Associations, she was appointed a Member of the Order of the British Empire (MBE) in the 1960 Queen's Birthday Honours for her welfare work on behalf of female veterans. She helped set up the Scholarship Trust Fund for Civilian Widows' Children in 1963, and was a research officer with the New South Wales Council on the Ageing (COTA) from 1969 to 1978. In 1975, Stevenson was involved in establishing the Kings Cross Community Aid and Information Service, serving for a time as president and as a member of the Management Committee until 1987.

Stevenson founded the Carers Association of New South Wales, and became its first president in 1980. While serving with COTA in 1974, she had prepared a report titled "Dedication" concerning the levels of assistance given to the elderly by their family and friends. This led to her forming in 1976 a subcommittee of COTA made up of carers, from which she later created the Carers Association as an independent organisation. As president of the association, Stevenson lobbied for the establishment of a carers pension in New South Wales, which was legislated in 1985. She is commemorated at the Carers Association (now Carers NSW) by the Clare Stevenson Memorial Lectures.

In 1981, to commemorate the fortieth anniversary of the formation of women's services in World War II, Stevenson was asked to lead the female contingent in the Anzac Day parade in Sydney. She published The WAAAF Book, a collection of reminiscences by former members of the service, with Honor Darling in 1984. Stevenson was appointed a Member of the Order of Australia (AM) in the 1988 Australia Day Honours for her services to the community and her welfare work with veterans. Her hobbies included reading, classical music and, in her younger days, surfing. Stevenson never married. She died aged 85 in Mona Vale, New South Wales, on 22 October 1988, leaving her body to the University of Sydney.
