= Annie Ina Laidlaw =

(1889–1978) navy matron

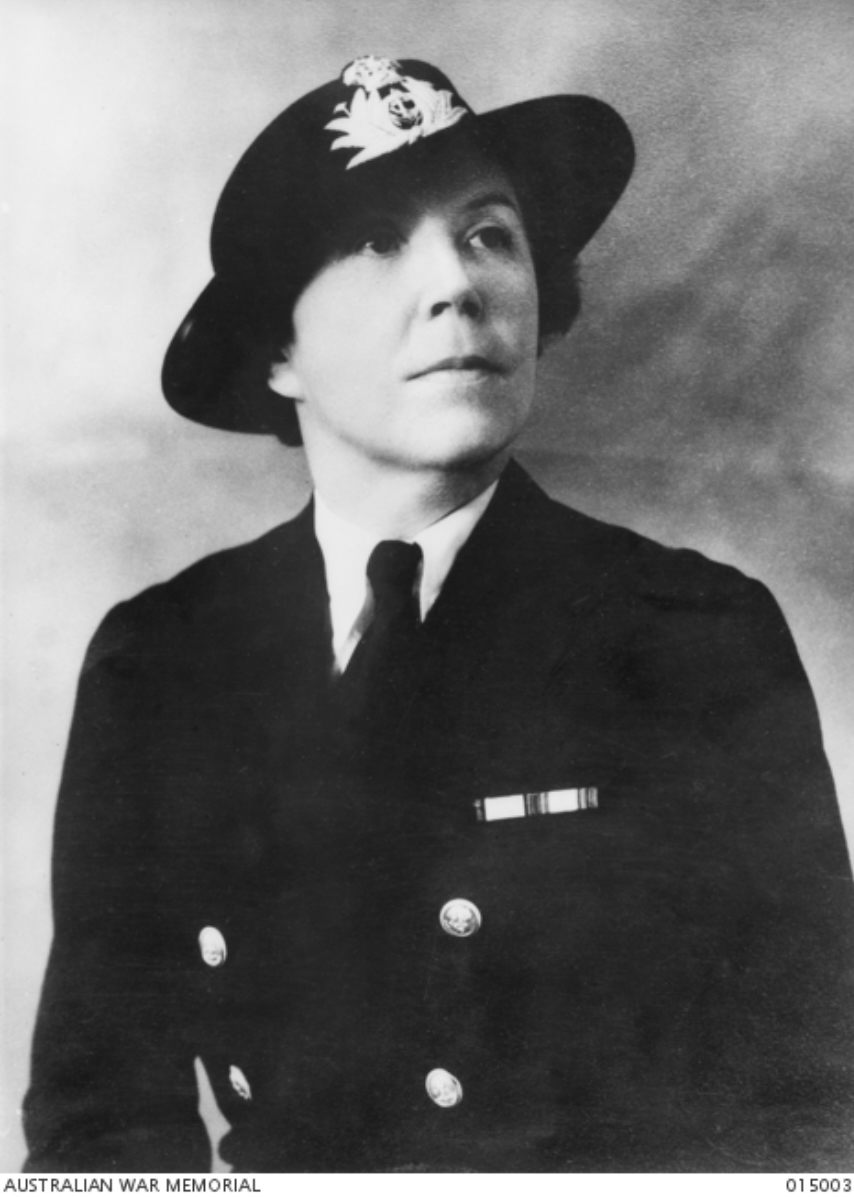
- Matron Annie Laidlaw in June 1943
- Born: 23 January 1889; Lake Wallace, Victoria
- Died: 13 September 1978 (aged 89); McKinnon, Victoria
- Military career
- Allegiance: Australia
- Branch: Australian Imperial Force (1917–19); Royal Australian Navy (1942–46)
- Service years: 1917–1919; 1942–1946
- Rank: Matron
- Unit: Australian Army Nursing Service (1917–19)
- Commands: Royal Australian Naval Nursing Service (1942–46)
- Conflicts: First World War; Second World War

Annie Ina Laidlaw (23 January 1889 – 13 September 1978) was an Australian nursing matron who led the Royal Australian Naval Nursing Service during the Second World War.

== Early life ==
Laidlaw was born on 23 January 1889 in Lake Wallace, Victoria. Her mother was also called Annie (née Gilchrist) and her father, James Adam Laidlaw, was a pastoralist. She attended Alexandra Ladies College, which later became part of Hamilton and Alexandra College. She completed three years of nursing training in 1916 at the (Royal) Children's Hospital, Melbourne, and she worked there until the following year when she joined the Australian Army Nursing Service. She joined the service in June and in the same month she set sail for India, where she worked in Bombay and Poona until 1919.

== Nursing career ==
The Royal Australian Naval Nursing Service (RANNS) was formed in 1942. Surgeon Captain William Carr, who was director of Australia's naval medical services, oversaw its creation. He chose Laidlaw, who he knew socially, to lead it and she was appointed as superintending sister with an equivalent rank of lieutenant commander in April 1942, based at Flinders Naval Base where the RANNS had its own hospital. Women were recruited directly into the RAN. Laidlaw was involved in appointing the first 24. Twelve were appointed in Sydney and the remainder in Melbourne. They were required to have at least a year of nursing experience. In March 1943 she was given the title of matron as a promotion. Her nurses were widely distributed. At its wartime peak the RANNS was made up of 60 nursing sisters.

In 1946 Laidlaw returned to her position at the Children's Hospital in Frankston, spent 1951–1952 at the Queen Elizabeth Hospital for Children in London, then returned to Australia as matron of the Freemason's Homes of Victoria in Prahran in 1952. She retired in 1957.

Laidlaw died in McKinnon, Victoria, on 13 September 1978.
