= Doris Carter =

Australian athlete and military officer (1912–1999)

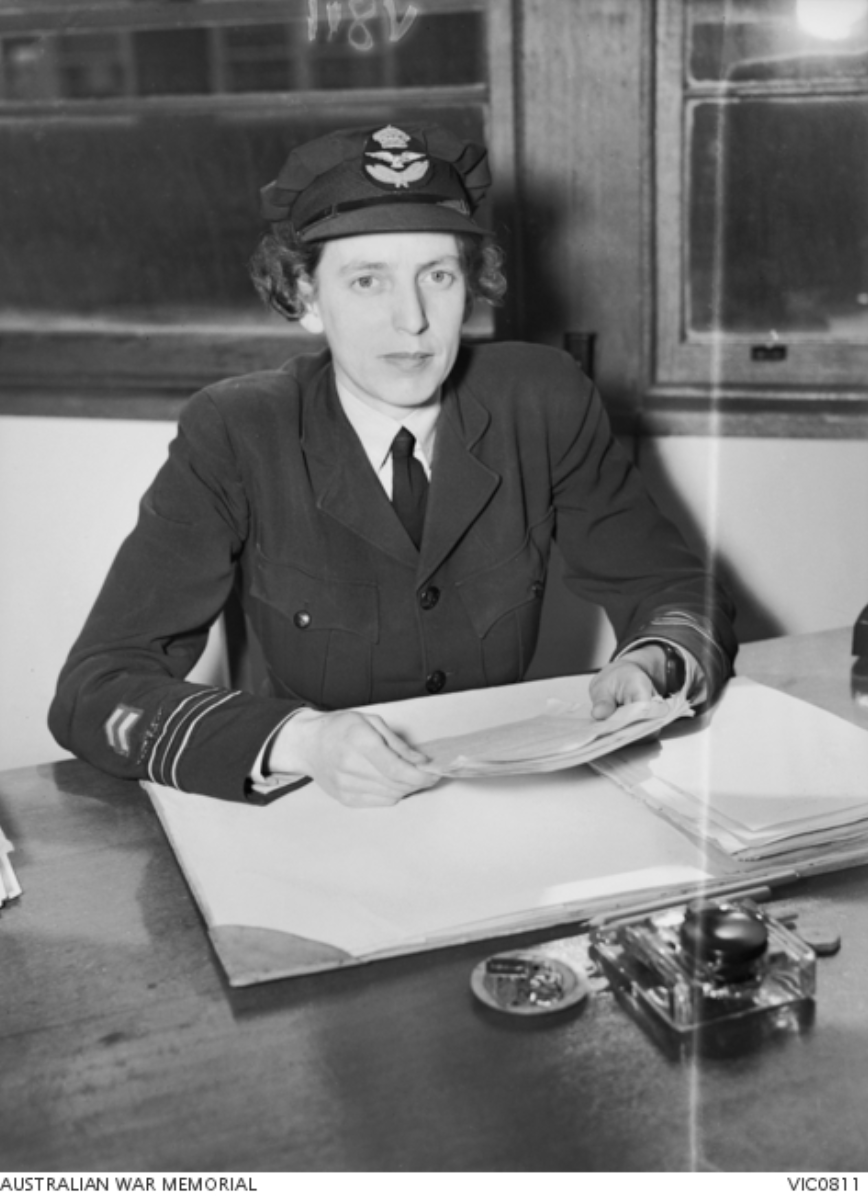
- Squadron Officer Doris Carter, WAAAF, c. 1944
- Born: 5 January 1912
- Died: 28 July 1999 (aged 87)
- Military career
- Allegiance: Australia
- Branch: Women's Auxiliary Australian Air Force; Women's Royal Australian Air Force
- Service years: 1941–1946; 1951–1960
- Rank: Wing Officer
- Commands: Women's Royal Australian Air Force (1951–60)
- Conflicts: Second World War
- Awards: Officer of the Order of the British Empire
- Sports career
- National team: Australia
- Sport: Track and Field
- Rank: High jump: World top 3 between 1934–1936
- Events: High jump; Hurdles; Discus
- Coached by: Self coached

Sports achievements and titles
- National finals: Australian Athletics ChampionshipsHigh jump; 2008 Summer Paralympics: 400 m – Silver
- Personal bests: High jump: 1.615m (1936); 90 yards Hurdles: 12.1 (1940); Discus: 38.67m (1939)

Doris Jessie Carter, OBE (5 January 1912 – 28 July 1999) was an Australian military officer, public servant, and athlete who specialised in the high jump. She was ranked as one of the top 3 Women's high jumpers from 1934 to 1936. She was the first Australian female track and field athlete to compete in an Olympic Games final. She was inducted into the Athletics Australia Hall of Fame in 2022.

Carter placed 6th in the 1936 Olympics in Berlin and also competed in the 1938 British Empire Games in Sydney. She won six National Championships at high jump (1932, 1933, 1935, 1936, 1937, 1940) and two at discus throw (1936, 1940) in her career.

Carter served as president of the Victorian Women's Amateur Athletic Association (1945–48) and Australian Women's Amateur Athletic Union (1948) and (1952–61). In 1956, Carter was the Assistant Manager to the Australian Olympic Team during the Melbourne Olympic Games.

Carter was also prominent with the Women's Auxiliary Australian Air Force during the Second World War and, on the raising of the Women's Royal Australian Air Force in 1951, she was appointed the service's director. She retired from the post in 1960. Carter co-led the Anzac Day Parade at Melbourne in the mid-1990s.

== Early life and education ==
Carter was born and raised in North Carlton, Melbourne, Victoria, the first child of Jessie Christina Carter (née Marshall) from Tasmania and Edward William Carter, a boilermaker and cabinet maker born in Victoria.

She attended South Brunswick State School and later Coburg High School, where she left at the age of 17 with a Leaving certificate.

In 1930, Carter enrolled at Melbourne Teachers' College, qualified and then became a teacher at Melville Forest State School (1931–33) in rural western Victoria. Subsequent teaching positions were in Melbourne at South Preston (1934–1936) and Moreland Central (1937–1947) state schools. As a teacher, Carter assisted with physical education courses for the state Education Department, and later served as president of the Victorian State Schools' Amateur Athletic Association (1938–1941).

== Career ==
=== Athletics ===
Carter regularly competed in hurdles, discus, and high jump events in the 1930s. She won titles and set records at State and club events and she also won six National Championships at high jump (1932, 1933, 1935, 1936, 1937, 1940) and two at discus throw (1936, 1940) in her career. She held the Australian high jump record until 1954. She was ranked in the top three high jumpers globally from 1934 to 1936, and when she retired in 1940, she was ranked in 11th place.

As one of 33 athletes (only four were women) competing for Australia at the Berlin Olympic Games in 1936, Carter was the first Australian female field athlete to compete in an Olympic Games. In the high jump event, she came equal fifth, and she was to replicate this fifth placing when she competed at the British Empire Games held in Sydney in 1938.

Carter achieved her personal bests in: high jump in 1936, jumping 1.615 m (1.766 yd)hurdles in 1940, running 12.1; and in discus in 1939 she threw 38.67m.

In 1937, Carter played for Victoria's women's hockey team and in 1939 was selected to tour England, although the education department did not grant her leave. She went on to play baseball, cricket, golf, and bowls, and to enjoy gardening and fishing.

When the Olympic Games were to be held in Melbourne, Carter and the former hockey player and sports advocate Sybil Taggart were the first women ever appointed to an Olympic organising committee in 1953. Three years later in 1956, as general manager of the Australian women's Olympic team, she led the athletes onto the Melbourne Cricket Ground.

Following her competitive career, Carter became involved in the administration of women's athletics both at the state and National levels. She was President of the Victorian Womens Amateur Athletic Association from 1945 to 1948. Carter also served twice as President of the Australian Women's Amateur Athletic Union, firstly in 1948 and again between 1952 and 1962.

=== Military ===
When World War II started, Carter joined the Women's Air Training Corps while continuing to work for the education department. Appointed as an assistant section officer in the Women's Auxiliary Australian Air Force (WAAAF), Carter was posted to the Royal Australian Air Force (RAAF) School of Administration as an instructor of new WAAAF officers. She was demobilised in 1945 and recalled to lead the WAAAF group at the victory parade in London in June 1946. Her next position in 1948 was as officer-in-charge of child and youth migration at Australia House, for the Department of Immigration.

After the RAAF reorganised its women's forces in 1951, Carter was appointed the inaugural director of the WRAAF. She was awarded an OBE for her post-war services in 1957, and had risen to the rank of wing officer when she resigned in 1960. She was later a trustee of the Australian War Memorial (1969–75) and became the first woman to lead an Anzac Day march in 1996.

After a stint as general secretary of the Young Women's Christian Association (YWCA) (1960), she joined the senior headquarters staff of the Girl Guides’ Association of Victoria (1963–77) and National Fitness Council of Victoria (1971–77).

== Death and legacy ==
Carter died at Rushall Park retirement village in North Fitzroy in Melbourne on 28 July 1999 and was cremated.

In 2021, Doris Carter was one of five heroes of the sky honoured with the issue of $1 coins by the Royal Australian Mint to commemorate the centenary of the RAAF.

Coburg High School later named one of their sports houses in her honour in 1961.

In 2022, Carter was honoured at the Athletics Australia Awards when she was inducted into the Athletics Australia Hall of Fame.

== Sports career statistics ==
=== Australian Athletics Championships ===
| | | High jump. | | Discus throw. | | 90 yard Hurdles. |
| Year | Team | Place | Height | Place | Distance | Place | Time |
|---|---|---|---|---|---|---|---|
| 1929–30 | Vic | 2nd | 1.47m | — | — | — | — |
| 1932–33 | Vic | 1st | 4 ft 10 7/8 in (1.495 m) | — | — | 3rd | Not recorded |
| 1934–35 | Vic | 1st | 5 ft 0 3/8 in (1.534 m) | 3rd | 90 ft 10 in (27.69 m) | 2nd | 13.1 (est) |
| 1935–36 | Vic | 1st | 4 ft 10 1/2 in (1.486 m) | 1st | 100 ft 11 1/2 in (30.772 m) | 3rd | Not recorded |
| 1937–38 | Vic | 1st | 5 ft 0 in (1.52 m) | 2nd | 96 ft 11 in (29.54 m) | — | — |
| 1939–40 | Vic | 1st | 5 ft 0 in (1.52 m) | 1st | 106 ft 9 3/4 in (32.556 m) | 2nd | Not recorded |

=== International High Jump competitions ===
| | | | | Qualifiers. | | Games |
| Year | Games. | Held | Representing | Result | Height | Place | Height |
|---|---|---|---|---|---|---|---|
| 1934 | British Empire Games | London | Australia | Ranked 3rd Globally No Australian women selected |
| 1936 | Olympic Games | Berlin | Australia | Selected | 1.615m | 6th | 1.55m |
| 1938 | British Empire Games | Sydney | Australia | Selected | | 5th | 1.55m |
| 1939 | International Hockey tour | United Kingdom | Australia | Selected, but withdrew due to work commitments |

== See also ==
- Australian athletics champions (Women)

Military offices
| New office | Director of the Women's Royal Australian Air Force; 1951–1960 | Succeeded by Group Officer Lois Pitman |
