= Mary Bell (aviator) =

20th-century Australian aviator

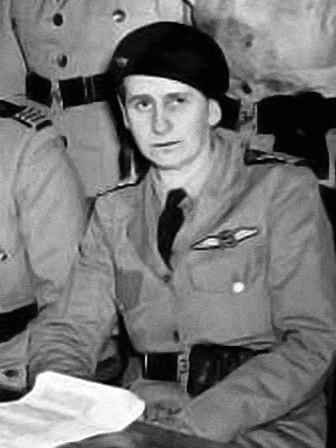
- Bell with Women's Air Training Corps in 1941
- Born: 3 December 1903; Launceston, Tasmania
- Died: 6 February 1979 (aged 75); Ulverstone, Tasmania
- Military career
- Allegiance: Australia
- Branch: Royal Australian Air Force
- Service years: 1941–1945
- Rank: Flight Officer
- Nickname: "Paddy"
- Unit: WAAAF (1941–1945)
- Conflicts: World War II
- Other work: Farmer

Mary Teston Luis Bell (3 December 1903 – 6 February 1979) was an Australian aviator and founding leader of the Women's Air Training Corps (WATC), a volunteer organisation that provided support to the Royal Australian Air Force (RAAF) during World War II. She later helped establish the Women's Auxiliary Australian Air Force (WAAAF), the country's first and largest women's wartime service, which grew to more than 18,000 members by 1944.

Born Mary Fernandes in Tasmania, Bell married a RAAF officer in 1923 and obtained her pilot's licence in 1927. Given temporary command of the WAAAF on its formation in 1941, she was passed over as its inaugural director in favour of corporate executive Clare Stevenson. Bell refused the post of deputy director and resigned, but subsequently rejoined and served until the final months of the war. She and her husband later became farmers. Nicknamed "Paddy", Bell died in 1979, aged seventy-five.

== Early life and WATC ==
Mary Teston Luis Bell was born on 3 December 1903 in Launceston, Tasmania. She was the daughter of Rowland Walker Luis Fernandes, an English-born clerk, and his Australian wife, Emma Dagmar, née Mahony. Her maternal great-great-grandfather was shipwright Jonathan Griffiths. Mary attended Church of England Girls' Grammar School, Launceston, and St Margaret's School, Devonport, before commencing work in a solicitor's office aged fourteen. She married John Bell (1889–1973), a Royal Australian Air Force (RAAF) officer and World War I veteran of the Gallipoli campaign and the Australian Flying Corps, at St Andrew's Anglican Church in Brighton, Victoria, on 19 March 1923. They had a daughter in 1926.

From 1925 until early 1928, the Bells lived in England while John attended RAF Staff College, Andover, and served as RAAF liaison officer to the Royal Air Force (RAF). Interested in aviation since her teens, Mary learnt to fly in England and in April 1927 qualified for a Grade A private pilot's licence. Returning to Australia, on 20 March 1928 she became the first female to gain a pilot's licence in Victoria, and the sixth in Australia. The following year, she became the first Australian woman to qualify as a ground engineer.

The Bells moved to Brisbane in 1939. John was employed as Queensland manager for Airlines of Australia Ltd, having left the RAAF in 1929. Mary became leader of forty or so members of the Women's National Emergency Legion Air Wing who had volunteered to assist with aircraft maintenance during times of war. Determining that their objectives would not be met in their existing organisation, on 17 July they formed a new volunteer paramilitary group, the Women's Air Training Corps (WATC), and elected Bell its commander. She soon expanded the WATC into a national organisation, with commandants leading each state's chapter, and herself as Australian Commandant. WATC members trained as drivers, clerks and telegraphists. They wore a uniform of field grey coat and skirt, and navy blue tie and glengarry. Active membership had grown to 2,000 by October 1940.

Bell wrote to Air Vice-Marshal Richard Williams, with whom she was acquainted via her husband and through aviation circles, advocating the establishment of a women's branch of the RAAF similar to the RAF's Women's Auxiliary Air Force (WAAF). Among other things, she called attention to the female volunteers who had already been supporting the Air Force in transport, nursing and clerical duties. The WATC was one of several women's voluntary organisations whose members were keen to support the military, arguing that their personnel provided a ready-made pool of skilled staff for auxiliary services, saving the government time and money training unskilled labour.

== World War II and WAAAF ==
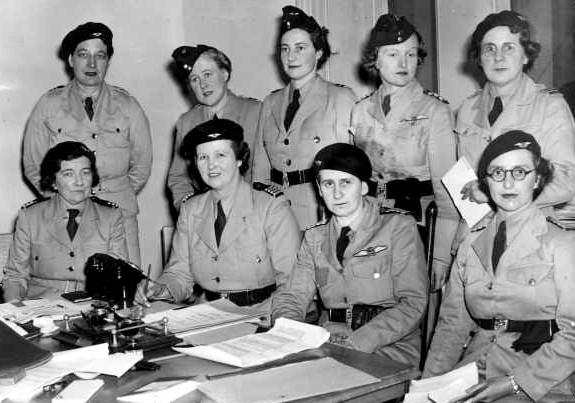
Bell (seated second from right) at a council meeting of the Women's Air Training Corps, June 1941; on Bell's right is her successor as Commandant of the WATC, Countess Bective

Australia having declared war on Germany on 3 September 1939, the RAAF Air Board met in November to discuss Bell's letter, but postponed taking action. She continued to lobby, as did several other women's groups seeking to support the war effort and free male staff for overseas postings.

In July 1940, the new Chief of the Air Staff, Air Chief Marshal Sir Charles Burnett, invited Bell to produce a proposal for a women's auxiliary under the supervision of her husband John, who had rejoined the Air Force at the war's outbreak and was now a wing commander in the Directorate of Organisation at RAAF Headquarters, Melbourne. Mary recommended forming the new service under the Air Force Act to permit women to enlist for the duration of the war under conditions similar to RAAF members, rather than enrolling on a short-term contractual basis, a radical idea at the time that would not be put in place until 1943. She also suggested a volunteer reserve or citizen force to augment the enlisted women, effectively the existing WATC, though this was seen as placing too much emphasis on her personal command.

Some senior Air Force officers, including the recently promoted Air Marshal Williams, and the Director of Personal Services, Group Captain Joe Hewitt, opposed a women's service. Burnett, an RAF member who appreciated how the WAAF proved its worth during the Battle of Britain, championed its establishment as the Women's Auxiliary Australian Air Force (WAAAF).

Bell was appointed to the RAAF's Personnel Branch as Staff Officer (Administrative) with the probationary rank of section officer (acting flight officer) on 24 February 1941, to lay the groundwork for the new organisation. She was succeeded as Australian Commandant of the WATC by the Countess of Bective, previously the State Commandant of South Australia. Formally established on 25 March, the WAAAF was the first uniformed women's branch of an armed service in Australia, predating similar organisations in the Army and Navy. Bell led the WAAAF for the first three months of its existence, recruiting approximately two hundred women by June; of the first six officers she appointed, five were former members of the WATC.

I was given an office containing two tables, one chair, one form, one telephone and nothing else and told to get on with it... Luckily I had been associated with the RAAF since its formation when my husband was one of the original officers so knew most of the senior officers and my way about generally.

— Mary Bell, on leading the WAAAF in 1941

On 21 May 1941, Berlei corporate executive Clare Stevenson was appointed Director WAAAF with Bell as her deputy director, effective from 9 June. The Air Member for Personnel, Air Vice-Marshal Henry Wrigley, chose Stevenson on the basis of her management background and because she was not a "socialite". Notwithstanding her aviation experience and familiarity with the RAAF, he considered Bell to be "tangled up with the WATC", where she "waved the flag and obtained a great deal of publicity for herself". Bell may also have alienated Burnett by not including his daughter Sybil-Jean, a founding member of the WAAF, among the initial intake of staff.

Bell chose to resign on learning of Stevenson's appointment, rather than stay on and report to someone from outside the service fraternity; she later rejoined at Wrigley's request, but stipulated that she would accept no promotion higher than flight officer. Two of her original officer appointees also resigned when Bell was passed over, later describing her as "a thorough and effective organiser" and the "obvious choice" as director. Returning to the WAAAF on 5 October 1942, Bell served at RAAF Headquarters in several directorates, mainly that of Medical Services.

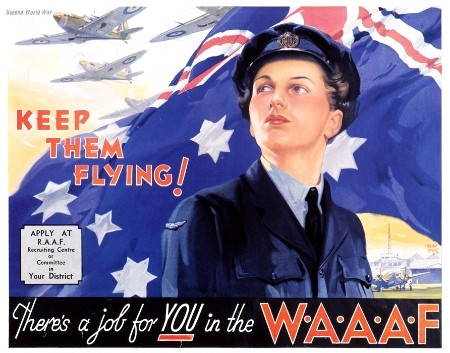
WAAAF recruiting poster, c. 1942

Despite Bell's recommendation in July 1940 that women be enlisted into the WAAAF as permanent staff, they were at first enrolled only for renewable twelve-month contracts. They did not become part of the Permanent Air Force, with the benefits that entailed, until the Air Force (Women's Services) Regulations were enacted on 24 March 1943; that day, Bell's commission as a section officer, and her temporary rank of flight officer with effect from 1 October 1942, was promulgated in the Commonwealth of Australia Gazette. Pay in the WAAAF was only ever two-thirds that of male equivalents. The organisation nevertheless grew rapidly, peaking in strength at over 18,600 members in October 1944, or twelve per cent of all RAAF personnel. By the end of the war 27,000 women had served in the WAAAF, at one stage comprising over thirty-one per cent of ground staff and filling sixty-one trades, all previously occupied by men.

== Later life ==
Ranked flight officer, Mary Bell was discharged from the WAAAF at her own request on 11 April 1945. Her husband John was an acting air commodore when he left the RAAF on 15 October. The WAAAF, Australia's largest wartime women's service, was disbanded on 30 September 1946. It was succeeded in 1950 by the Women's Royal Australian Air Force (WRAAF), which had a separate charter to the RAAF; members achieved a pay scale equal to the male service in 1972, and five years later were integrated with the RAAF.

After leaving the military, the Bells became farmers, first in Victoria and then in Tasmania. They retired in 1968. Survived by her daughter, Bell died in Ulverstone, Tasmania, on 6 February 1979, and was buried beside her husband, who predeceased her in 1973, at Mersey Vale Memorial Park cemetery in Spreyton.
