= Lois Pitman =

Australian military officer and social worker

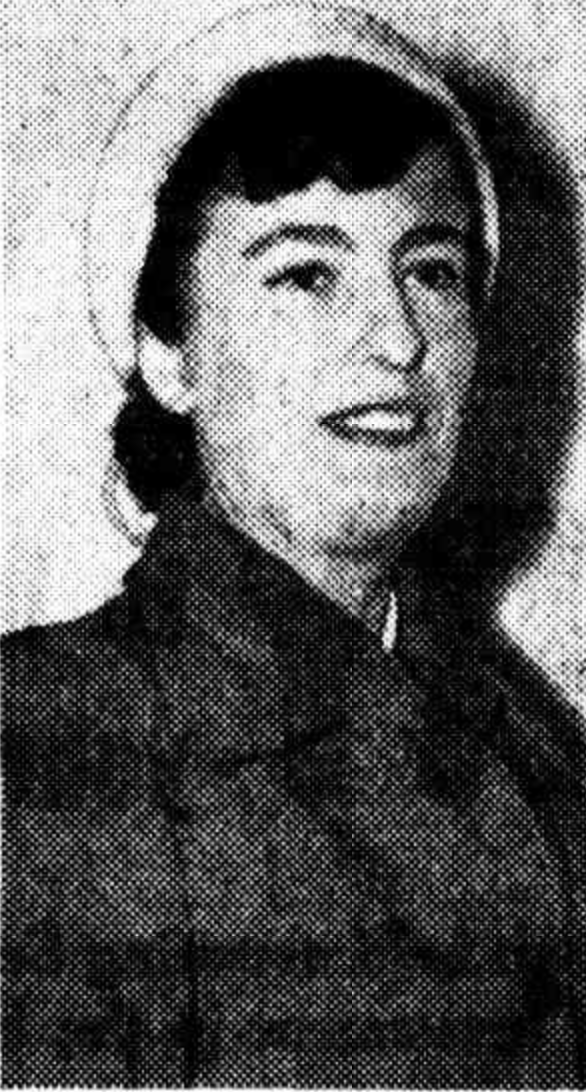
- Pitman, on her appointment as Flight Officer in 1950
- Born: c. 1919; Melbourne, Victoria
- Died: 30 October 2014 (aged 95); Melbourne, Victoria
- Military career
- Allegiance: Australia
- Branch: Women's Auxiliary Australian Air Force; Women's Royal Australian Air Force
- Service years: 1942–1946; 1960–1972
- Rank: Group Officer
- Commands: Women's Royal Australian Air Force (1960–72)
- Conflicts: Second World War
- Awards: Officer of the Order of the British Empire

Lois Katrine Pitman, OBE (c. 1919 – 30 October 2014) was an Australian military officer and social worker. She served as director of the Women's Royal Australian Air Force (WRAAF) from 1960 to 1972.

Born in Melbourne, Pitman joined the Women's Auxiliary Australian Air Force in 1942 and later served with the Department of Post-War Reconstruction. She qualified as a social worker and worked with the Heidelberg Repatriation Hospital and the St Thomas' Hospital. After joining the WRAAF she studied psychology at Australian National University.

Pitman was appointed an Officer of the Order of the British Empire in 1968.

Military offices
Preceded by Wing Officer Doris Carter	Director of the Women's Royal Australian Air Force; 1960–1972	Succeeded by Group Officer Dawn Parsloe
