= Hamilton and Alexandra College =

The Hamilton and Alexandra College

Location
- Hamilton VIC; Hamilton, Victoria; Australia; 37°44′14″S 142°1′26″E

Information
- School type: Independent Day and Boarding School
- Motto: Knowledge and Wisdom
- Denomination: associated with the Uniting Church in Australia
- Established: 1871
- Principal: Dr Michael Horne
- Grades: Early Learning Centre, Prep–Year 12
- Gender: Any
- Campus: Snr, Jnr (Myrniong), Equestrian Centre
- Houses: Berry, Laidlaw, Learmonth and Young
- Colours: Navy, gold and maroon
- Slogan: Known, Valued and Challenged
- Sports: Hockey, cricket, football (AFL), Netball
- Publication: The Collandrian
- Newspaper: The Ivy and the Tower (Biannual)
- Alumni: Old Collegians
- Website: Hamilton and Alexandra College

The Hamilton and Alexandra College is an independent, private non-profit, co-educational day and boarding school located in Hamilton, Victoria, Australia.

== History ==
The college came into existence as a co-educational school in 1962 as an amalgamation of the former Hamilton and Western District Boys' College which was founded in 1871, and Alexandra College, founded in 1872.

The school has been known as Hamilton College for most of its post amalgamation existence. In the early 21st century, the name of the college was changed to The Hamilton And Alexandra College to reflect its relationship with Alexandra College, the former school for girls.

Dr Michael Horne commenced as the College's Principal in 2023.

== Curricula ==
At Year 11 and 12 level, the school teaches the Victorian Certificate of Education (VCE).

== Campuses ==
The College has two campuses within Hamilton. The Chaucer Street Campus encompasses the Senior School accommodating students from Year 7 through to Year 12. A separate 14 hectare property, "Myrniong", contains boarding houses for both boys and girls, Junior Campus and Equestrian Centre and is situated one and a half kilometres from the Senior Campus.

Approximately 20–25% of students at the school are resident at the boarding houses.

== Alumni ==
- Annie Ina Laidlaw (1889–1978) Head (Lt Colonel equiv.) of Royal Australian Naval Nursing Service
- Phyllis Rountree who was born in 1911 attended this (Ladies) college before she became a noted bacteriologist
- Holly Williams, investigative journalist, foreign and war correspondent
