= Australian women during World War II =

Actions of Australian women in the second world war

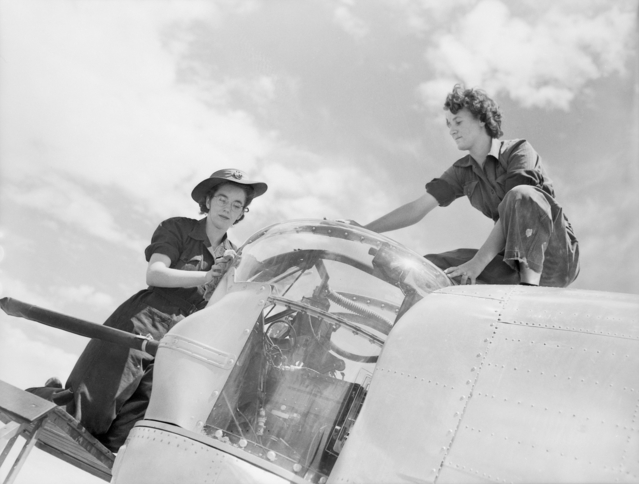
Two members of the Women's Auxiliary Australian Air Force working on a Consolidated B-24 Liberator heavy bomber in 1944

Australian women during World War II played a larger role than women had during World War I.

== Military service ==
Many women wanted to play an active role in the war and hundreds of voluntary women's auxiliary and paramilitary organisations had been formed by 1940. These included the Women's Transport Corps, Women's Flying Club, Women's Emergency Signalling Corps and Women's Australian National Services.

In July 1940 in Brisbane alone there were six different organisations providing women with war-related training, the largest of which was the Queensland-based Women's National Emergency Legion. The federal government and military did not initially support women being trained to serve in the armed forces, however, and these organisations were not taken seriously by the general public.

A shortage of male recruits forced the military to establish female branches in 1941 and 1942. The Royal Australian Air Force established the Women's Auxiliary Australian Air Force (WAAAF) in March 1941, the Army formed the Australian Women's Army Service (AWAS) in October 1941 and the Australian Army Medical Women's Service (AAMWS) in December 1942, and the Women's Royal Australian Naval Service (WRANS) came into being in July 1942. In 1944 almost 50,000 women were serving in the military and thousands more had joined the civilian Australian Women's Land Army (AWLA). Many of these women were trained to undertake skilled work in traditionally male occupations in order to free servicemen for operational service. Women were also encouraged to work in industry and volunteer for air raid precautions duties or clubs for Australian and Allied servicemen. The female branches of the military were disbanded after the war.

== Women in the economy ==
The role of women in the economy also changed during World War II. Women entered roles which had traditionally been limited to men, but continued to receive lower wages.

== Gallery ==
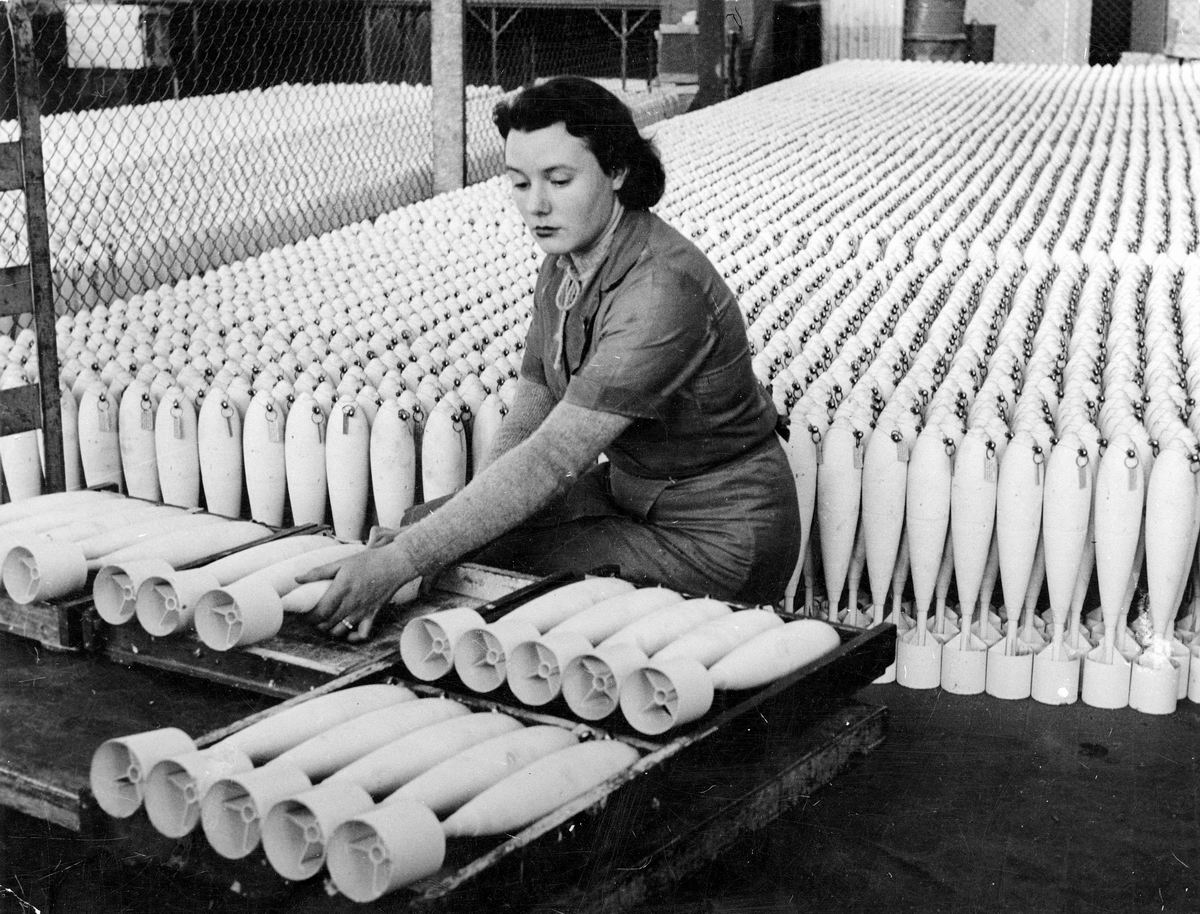
Stacking practice bombs in a factory, 1943

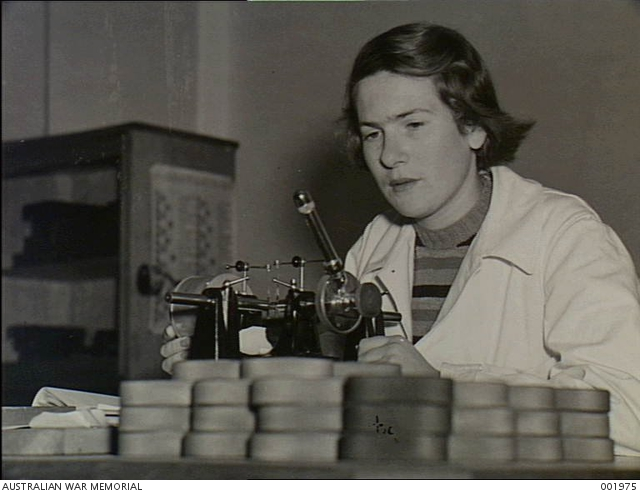
Working on a naval fuse at Defence Explosive Factory Maribyrnong, 1940

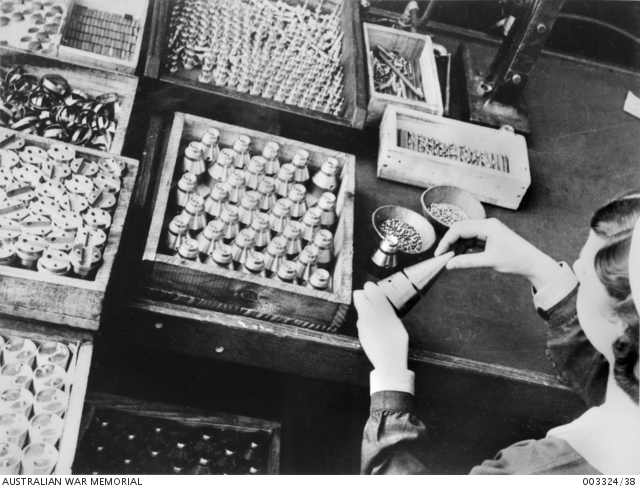
Assembling fuses for shells, Defence Explosive Factory Maribyrnong, 1940

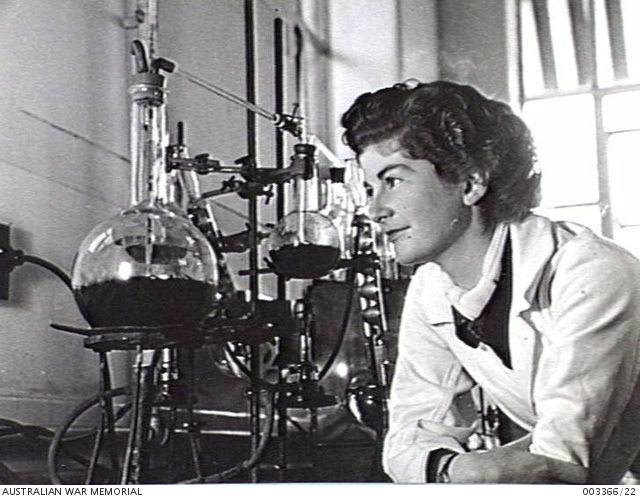
Technician testing an ingredient for explosives, Defence Explosive Factory Maribyrnong, 1940

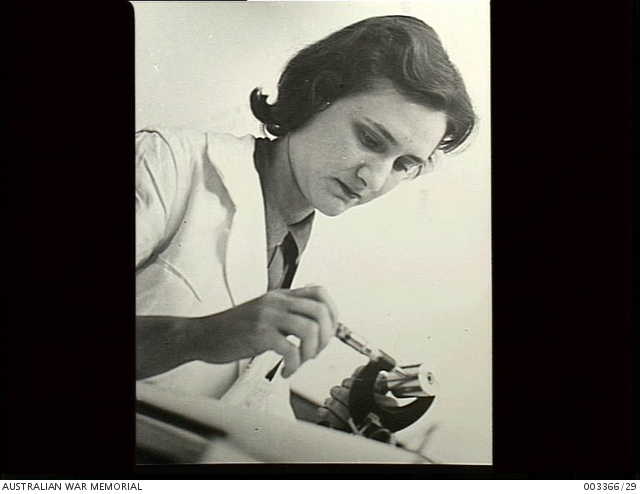
Measuring a plug gauge for a mine, Defence Explosive Factory Maribyrnong, 1940

== See also ==
- List of Australian women's organisations during World War II
