= Royal Australian Naval Nursing Service =

Australian female navy branch

The Royal Australian Naval Nursing Service (RANNS) was a former female branch of the Royal Australian Navy.

== History ==
The RANNS was formed in 1942. Surgeon Captain William Carr, who was director of Australia's naval medical services, oversaw its creation. He chose Annie Ina Laidlaw to lead it and she was appointed as superintending sister with an equivalent rank of lieutenant commander in April 1942, based at Flinders Naval Base.

Women were recruited directly into the RAN. Laidlaw was involved in appointing the first 24. Twelve were appointed in Sydney and the rest in Melbourne. They were required to have at least a year of nursing experience. At its wartime peak the RANNS was made up of 60 nursing sisters. The RANNS was disbanded 1948 but the demand for nurses was so great that the organisation was reformed in November 1948. In June 1984 the RANNS and the other female branch of the RAN, the Women's Royal Australian Naval Service, were incorporated into the permanent force and all female nurses became members of the nursing branch of the RAN.

== See also ==
- Australian women during World War II
  - Women's Royal Australian Naval Service
  - Royal Australian Air Force Nursing Service
