= Phyllis Rountree =

Australian microbiologist and bacteriologist

Phyllis Margaret Rountree
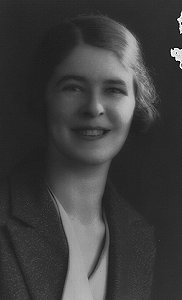
- young researcher
- Born: 13 January 1911; Hamilton, Victoria, Australia
- Died: 27 July 1994 (aged 83); Darlinghurst, New South Wales, Australia
- Education: University of Melbourne
- Occupations: microbiologist and bacteriologist
- Employer: Royal Prince Alfred Hospital

Phyllis Margaret Rountree (13 January 1911 – 27 July 1994) was an Australian microbiologist and bacteriologist. She was an expert in staphylococcal infections.

== Life ==
Rountree was born in 1911 in Hamilton, Victoria. Her mother's brother, William Roy Hodgson was a noted diplomat, but she was inspired by her learned aunts. She went to school locally at Hamilton and Alexandra College before boarding in Hawthorn at the Tintern Church of England Girls’ Grammar School. She studied zoology and bacteriology at the University of Melbourne. She had hoped to study medicine like her aunt but her father, a pharmacist, said she was "too young". It was a chance visit to her home town by Harold Addison Woodruff that inspired Rountree and persuaded her father that she should pursue a master's degree and become a bacteriologist.

She completed three years of a Council of Scientific & Industrial Research fellowship in 1934 by presenting her work to Professor James A. Prescott at the Waite Agricultural Research Institute in Adelaide. He made no additions or changes but she was not offered a permanent position, which she attributed to systemic gender bias. She had enjoyed the relaxed attitude there but male colleagues had not spoken to her during her work breaks and she was sure that a man successfully completing three years of research would have been retained. “‘Well now, it was very nice having you here dear, but we don't employ women permanently’” is how Rountree recalled her fellowship. She reflected on not being offered a continuing position at the institute, noting later in her life that “‘if I'd been a man, they probably would have found me something’”.

In 1936 she went to London where she studied for a post-graduate Diploma in Bacteriology at the London School of Hygiene. She supported herself by working at the British Public Health Laboratory and she returned to Australia the following year.

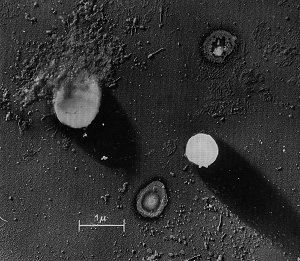
Rountree's Electron Micrograph taken c. 1954 at the Fairfax Institute of Pathology

After a year of food testing during the war, she started at the Royal Prince Alfred Hospital in 1944 where she was suspected of recruiting communists. The commonwealth authorities decided she was not interested in this in the 1950s. At this time she was a recognised expert on staphylococcal infections and she had noticed a growth in the number of surgical infections. There was a concern that this might have meant a return to pre-penicillin type infections. This was not the case and she become the chief bacteriologist in 1961.

In 1954, a profoundly virulent strain of staphylococcus called “80/81” surfaced in Australia and soon after in Canada. The strain appeared initially during a study of infections in the nursery at Royal North Shore Hospital in Sydney, Australia. In the nursery, five infants were found to have staphylococcal lesions that were unresponsive to penicillin. The chief researchers who found this infection called on Rountree, who had been using the emerging technique of phage typing, to identify the strain of staphylococcus infecting the babies using phage typing. Rountree found that the strain could only be typed using chemically modified bacteriophages, leading the researchers to believe that it was a novel strain. Rountree was responsible for the study of all staphylococcal infections at RNS Hospital, and uncovered that almost 50% of strains present were of the new type before it vanished and was replaced by a new strain in June 1953 that was similarly untypable. Rountree worked with members of the Staphylococcal Reference Laboratory in London, England, particularly Dr. Robert E. O. Williams, who confirmed that the RNS strain she sent could not be typed by any of the bacteriophages in Williams’ laboratory. The phage was termed “80”; studies from March 1953 to March 1954 uncovered a new staphylococcus strain was detected in Canada at an Ottawa hospital that demonstrated an inability to be typed, named by its investigators “81”. Rountree’s 80 strain was ultimately found to be identical to the Canadian 81 strain found by Dr. E. T. Bynoe, Dr. R. H. Elder, and Dr. R. D. Comtois. In 1955, Rountree reported that staphylococcus strain 80/81 was the culprit of 19 of every 23 cases of staphylococcus infection in Australian neonates and that the strain was carried by babies into the general community, countering an initial finding that the strain was restricted to hospital-contracted infections. Strain 80/81 eventually came to be found in Australia, New Zealand, Canada, Great Britain, and across the United States. The infectious strain devastated hospitals and confounded providers and bacteriologists with symptoms that included severe skin lesions in infants, abscesses in mothers’ breasts, and nurses with severe boils. The 1950 epidemics in nurseries gave bacteriologists like Rountree and others an opportunity to revitalize infection control procedures in the absence of an effective antibiotic to treat the 80/81 strain. In 1956, Rountree and other medical and scientific professionals co-authored the first manual pertaining to the management of hospital nursery staphylococcal infection. While the 80/81 strain’s prevalence faded in the 1960s, Rountree referenced this work she engaged in as the most important work of her career. In 1971 she was appointed Honorary Research Associate in Medical Microbiology at the University of New South Wales.

== Research ==
Much of Rountree’s work throughout her career was devoted to the study of Staphylococcus aureus, also known as 'golden staph', in addition to investigating its impact on the sterility of the hospital environment. The early works of her career involved researching hospital blankets as infection sources, specifically wound cross-infection with the use of oiled blankets. Studying staphylococcus infections in the hospital would become a prominent theme throughout Rountree’s career, culminating in an extensive portfolio of research examining staphylococcus and staphylococcus bacteriophages. Rountree’s research spans into a variety of domains involving Staphylococcus with a central focus on Staphylococcus aureus. A few areas of Rountree’s focus include the study of staphylococcus resistance to penicillin, methicillin, streptomycin, and neomycin, lysogenicity in staphylococci, nasal carriage of staphylococcus aureus in the general population, and changes in the phage-typing patterns of staphylococci. While the majority of Rountree’s work was published while she worked at Royal Prince Alfred Hospital, after her promotion to chief bacteriologist she published further notable works. One such piece includes “Observations on the distribution of Staphylococcus aureus in the atmosphere of a surgical ward”, which was published in 1962 in volume 60 of The Journal of Hygiene. In the study, Rountree and Mary A. Beard studied the bacteria that accumulated in two surgical wards over the span of one year while simultaneously examining patient nasal swabs and the bacteriological portfolio of patients with sepsis. Their work demonstrated that there was one predominant strain in the hospital, found in the air, wounds, nasal cavities, and bedding. The results uncovered a potential link between the transmission of staphylococcus bacteria from patient to patient via bedding. Rountree’s work and recommendations led to measures that contributed to reducing the spread of infection through the adoption of cotton blankets that could be laundered at higher temperatures and more frequently than woolen blankets. Rountree’s research ultimately led to many contemporary practices of infection control, a greater understanding of staphylococcus bacteria in the scientific community, and further uncovering of the relationship between the hospital environment and infection.

== Awards ==
Rountree won few awards and this may have been due to her reticence or that she didn't publish all her findings.

- Life Member of the Australian Society for Microbiology
- Honorary Doctor of Science degree from the University of Sydney (1987)
- In 2021, the newly established bacteriophage family Rountreeviridae was named in honor of Phyllis Rountree.
