= Group captain =

Royal Air Force officer rank

Group captain (Gp Capt or G/C) is a senior officer rank used by the Royal Air Force and air forces of nations countries that have historical British influence. Immediately senior to wing commander and immediately below air commodore, it is equivalent to the rank of captain in the navy and of colonel in other services.

The equivalent rank in the Women's Auxiliary Air Force, Women's Auxiliary Australian Air Force, Women's Royal Air Force (until 1968) and Princess Mary's Royal Air Force Nursing Service (until 1980) was "group officer".

== United Kingdom ==
Group captain
- Shoulder and sleeve insignia

- Masthead distinguishing flag
- Country: United Kingdom
- Service branch: Royal Air Force
- Abbreviation: Gp Capt
- Rank group: Senior officers
- NATO rank code: OF-5
- Formation: 1 April 1918
- Next higher rank: Air commodore
- Next lower rank: Wing commander
- Equivalent ranks: Captain (RN); Colonel (British Army; RM)

=== History ===
On 1 April 1918, the newly created RAF adopted its officer rank titles from the British Army, with Royal Naval Air Service captains and Royal Flying Corps colonels becoming colonels in the RAF. In response to the proposal that the RAF should use its own rank titles, it was suggested that the RAF might use the Royal Navy's officer ranks, with the word "air" inserted before the naval rank title. For example, the rank that later became group captain would have been "air captain". Although the Admiralty objected to this simple modification of their rank titles, it was agreed that the RAF might base many of its officer rank titles on naval officer ranks with differing pre-modifying terms. It was also suggested that RAF colonels might be entitled "bannerets" or "leaders". However, the rank title based on the Navy rank was preferred and, as RAF colonels typically commanded groups, the rank title "group captain" was chosen. The rank of group captain was introduced in August 1919 and has been used continuously since then.

Although in the early years of the RAF groups were normally commanded by group captains, by the mid-1920s they were usually commanded by an air officer.

In the post-World War II period the commander of an RAF flying station or a major ground training station has typically been a group captain. More recently, expeditionary air wings have also been commanded by group captains.

== Canada ==
The rank was used in the Royal Canadian Air Force until the 1968 unification of the Canadian Forces, when army-type rank titles were adopted. Canadian group captains then became colonels. In official Canadian French usage, the rank title was colonel d'aviation.

== India ==
=== Insignia and command pennant ===
The rank insignia is based on the four gold bands of captains in the Royal Navy, comprising four narrow light blue bands over slightly wider black bands. This is worn on both the lower sleeves of the tunic or on the shoulders of the flying suit or the casual uniform. Group captains are the first rank in the RAF hierarchy to wear gold braid on the peak of their cap, informally known as 'scrambled egg'; however, they still wear the standard RAF officer's cap badge.

The command pennant for a group captain is similar to the one for a wing commander except that there is one broad red band in the centre. Only the wing commander and group captain command pennants are triangular in shape.

An RAF group captain's sleeve/shoulder insignia

An RAF group captain's sleeve mess insignia

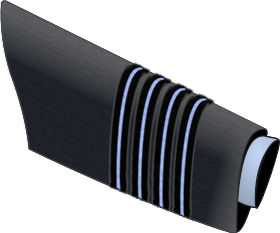
An RAF group captain's sleeve as it appears on the No. 1 dress

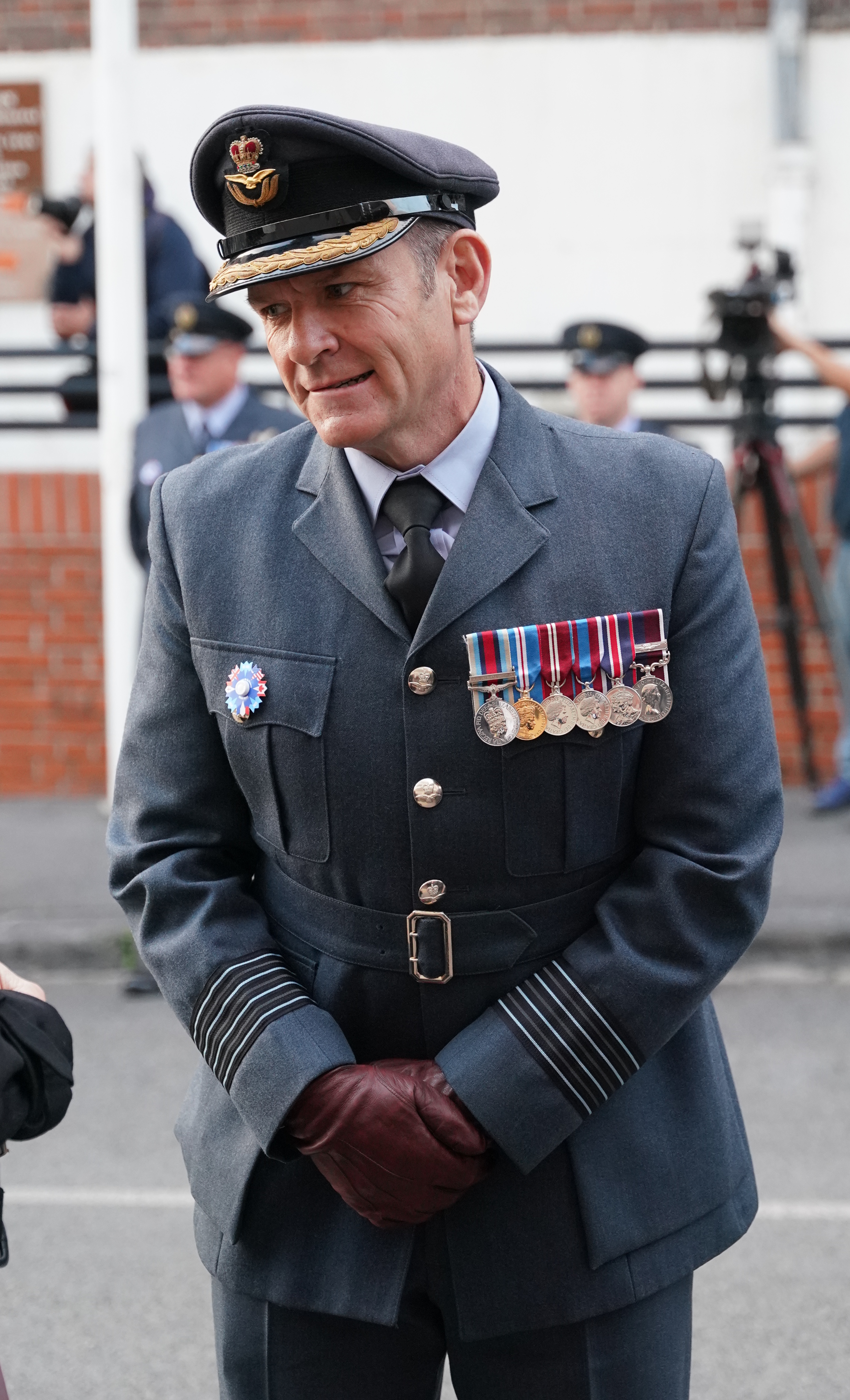

== Gallery ==
(Royal Australian Air Force)

(Bangladesh Air Force)

(Ghana Air Force)

(Indian Air Force)

(Namibian Air Force)

(Nigerian Air Force)

(Pakistan Air Force)

(Sri Lanka Air Force)

(Royal Air Force)

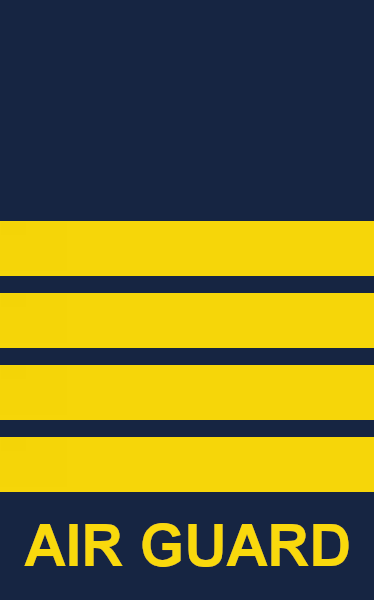
(Trinidad and Tobago Air Guard)

(Air Force of Zimbabwe)

== Notable group captains ==
- Sir Douglas Bader CBE, DSO & Bar, DFC & Bar, DL, FRAeS – World War II fighter pilot and double amputee
- Clive Robertson "Killer" Caldwell DSO, DFC & Bar, Cross of Valor (Poland) – Australia's highest-scoring fighter ace, also the highest-scoring P-40 pilot from any air force and the highest-scoring Allied pilot in North Africa. Became one of a small group of pilots throughout history to become an "ace in a day".
- Leonard Cheshire VC – World War II bomber pilot and charity worker
- Walter Churchill DSO, DFC – World War II ace fighter pilot, who also evaluated various makes of fighter aircraft for the RAF, and played a key role in getting Spitfire aircraft to the defence of Malta
- Hugh Dundas – World War II fighter pilot and the youngest person to hold this rank, aged 24 years
- Thomas Loel Guinness – World War II fighter pilot, politician and businessman
- Hamish Mahaddie DSO, DFC, AFC & Bar, FRAeS – Scotsman who flew in Bomber Command and became a key member of the Pathfinder Force as chief procurer of aircrew talent, often referred to as Don Bennett's "horse thief"
- Sailor Malan DSO & Bar, DFC & Bar – Royal Air Force flying ace who led No. 74 Squadron RAF during the Battle of Britain, authored the "Ten Simple Rules for Fighter Pilots" and under whose leadership No. 74 Squadron RAF changed outmoded RAF tactics and formations, changes later adopted by all of Fighter Command. In the 1969 cinema film Battle of Britain, the character of the "Squadron Leader" nicknamed Skipper played by Robert Shaw was based on Malan
- Herbert Massey – as a POW was Senior British Officer (SBO) at Stalag Luft III. He was portrayed in the movie The Great Escape (1963) as Group Captain Ramsey, and played by James Donald. Massey was crippled and walked with a stick, as did his character in the movie
- Virendera Singh Pathania, VrC, VM Indian Air force fighter pilot reputed for making first confirmed kill in aerial dogfight during Indo-Pakistani War of 1965.
- Percy Charles Pickard DSO & Two Bars, DFC – World War II bomber pilot and captain of "F for Freddie"
- Alan Rawlinson OBE, DFC & Bar, AFC, – Australian RAAF World War II fighter ace and later commissioned into RAF
- Stanisław Skarżyński – World War II bomber pilot. Commanding Officer RAF Lindholme. Polish Air Force. Transatlantic World Record Holder. Awarded Blériot Medal 1936
- James Stagg – RAF meteorologist involved in the planning of the D-Day invasion
- Clare Stevenson Director WAAAF
- Peter Townsend – World War II pilot and suitor of Princess Margaret
- John Allman Hemingway – World War II pilot and the last surviving airman of the Battle of Britain

=== Honorary ===
- Sally Bridgeland – Non executive director, adviser and trustee. Investment consultant, actuary, and former CEO of the BP Pension Fund
- Bruce Dickinson – Frontman of Iron Maiden. Honorary Gp. Capt. of 601 (County of London) Squadron RAF
- Sir Christopher Andrew Hoy MBE – Honorary Gp. Capt. as former Ambassador to the Royal Air Force Air Cadets
- Sachin Tendulkar – Honorary Indian Air Force group captain for his achievements in cricket
- Carol Vorderman MBE – Honorary Gp. Capt. as current Ambassador to the Royal Air Force Air Cadets

=== Fictional characters ===
- Ian Gilmore, a fictional character in Doctor Who
- Group Captain Tennant James, a fictional character in Doctor Who
- Captain Jack Harkness, a fictional character in Doctor Who and its spin-off Torchwood
- Group Captain Lionel Mandrake, a fictional character and exchange officer in the film Dr. Strangelove, played by Peter Sellers
- Group Captain Rodney Crittendon, a fictional character in the television show Hogan's Heroes, played by Bernard Fox (Crittendon was titled on the show as the equivalent rank of colonel to avoid confusion with the American audience.)

== See also ==
- Air force officer rank insignia
- British and U.S. military ranks compared
- Comparative military ranks
- RAF officer ranks
- Ranks of the RAAF
