= Women's Cavalry Corps =

Australian female auxiliary and training organization

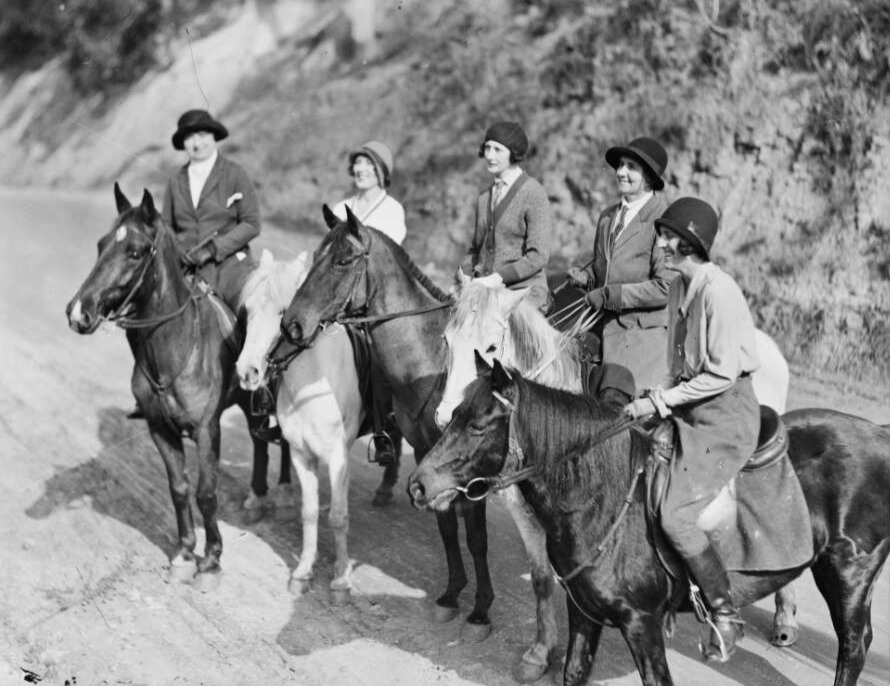
- Five members of the Women's Cavalry Corps in June 1941
- Active: 1940–1942?
- Country: Australia
- Type: Paramilitary auxiliary and training organisation

The Women's Cavalry Corps was a privately organised military training organisation for women in Sydney during World War II. It was founded in August 1940 and appears to have become defunct in 1942.

== History ==
During the first years of World War II hundreds of voluntary women's auxiliary and paramilitary organisations were established in Australia. Members of these organisations wore uniforms that were similar to those of the Australian military, adopted military-style ranks and regularly met for training sessions. The organisations pre-dated the establishment of women's branches of the military, which began to be formed in mid-1940.

In 1938 a Women's Cavalry Corps located in Melbourne was established as part of the Australian Women's Legion. This remained active as of November 1941.

A separate, and independent, Women's Cavalry Corps was formed in Sydney by Edith Bull during August 1940. As of December that year, the organisation had 30 members who were aged between 13 and 25. They practiced horse riding and received instructions in horse care at camps held at Liverpool each weekend. This included learning how to conduct mounted police drills. The role of the corps was to train women to assist the war effort, including to contribute to efforts to evacuate people if Australia was attacked.

By October 1941 the Women's Cavalry Corps was putting on displays of cavalry drill. The next month it was reported that training included instruction in operating firearms.

In March 1942, following the outbreak of the Pacific War, 60 members of the Women's Cavalry Corps volunteered to serve with the Australian People's Defence Auxiliary, a newly formed male irregular force that intended to fight as guerrillas if Australia was invaded. Bull told The Daily Telegraph that members of the Women's Cavalry Corps "know how to shoot and how to take cover" and were trained to use small-calibre firearms and revolvers. She also said that members of the organisation "are keen to have a shot at the Japs".
