= William Carr (admiral) =

Australian naval officer and physician

- Surgeon Commodore William Carr
- Born: 30 January 1883; Thornton in Craven, England
- Died: 16 May 1966 (aged 83); Frankston, Australia
- Military career
- Allegiance: Australia
- Branch: Royal Australian Navy
- Service years: 1912–1946
- Rank: Surgeon Rear Admiral
- Commands: Director of Naval Medical Services (1932–46)
- Conflicts: First World War; Second World War
- Awards: Commander of the Order of the British Empire

William James Carr (30 January 1883 – 16 May 1966) was an Australian naval officer and physician, who served as the Royal Australian Navy's Director of Naval Medical Services from 1932 to 1946.

== Early life ==
Carr was born in Thornton in Craven, a village in the West Riding of Yorkshire, England, where his father James was a solicitor. He was educated at Marlborough College in Wiltshire and at Trinity College, Cambridge, where he gained an arts degree in 1904, specialising in classics: he read both Latin and Greek. He then studied medicine at the Royal London Hospital, becoming an LRCP and MRCS in 1908. He remained at London Hospital as a resident medical officer until 1910, and then worked as a ship's doctor on a merchant vessel.

== Naval medical career ==
In 1911 the newly formed Royal Australian Navy (RAN) advertised in Britain for professional men to join the service, and Carr enlisted on 9 December. He was posted to the new Australian light cruiser HMAS Melbourne with the rank of surgeon-lieutenant, where he served until 1917. During the First World War he saw service in New Guinea (where he was present at the German surrender of Rabaul), the Pacific, North Atlantic and West Indies. In October 1917 he transferred to the battlecruiser HMAS Australia, and in March 1918 to the cruiser HMAS Sydney, where he served until 1920. In August 1919 he married Leonora Eddington, to whom he had been engaged since 1914. They had a son and two daughters.

In 1920 Carr was posted to the RAN College at Jervis Bay, south of Sydney, and was promoted to surgeon-commander. In 1925 he went on an exchange posting to the Royal Naval Hospital near Portsmouth, England, and on his return to Australia in 1927 he was posted to HMAS Cerberus, the RAN naval base at Flinders, south of Melbourne. He bought a home at Frankston, halfway between Melbourne and Flinders, where he lived for the rest of his life.

In 1932 Carr was appointed Director of Naval Medical Services (DNMS) with the rank of surgeon-captain. The RAN at this time had been drastically cut back following the London Naval Treaty and the spending cuts during the Great Depression. Nevertheless, Carr was able to build up a system of naval medical training and facilities that proved to be effective when the RAN began to expand again in the late 1930s. During World War II Carr oversaw an extensive network of RAN medical facilities across the South-West Pacific theatre, and from 1943 was also in charge of the Royal Navy's medical services in the Pacific. His status was recognised by his appointment as an honorary aide de camp to the Governor of Victoria, and as an honorary surgeon to King George VI in 1944.

== Retirement ==
Carr retired in March 1946 with a Commander of the Order of the British Empire and the rank of surgeon rear admiral, the first Australian naval surgeon to attain flag rank. In retirement he was active in local affairs and was a delegate to Victorian state conferences of the Liberal Party. He died at Frankston, Victoria in May 1966.
