= Women's Royal Australian Air Force =

The Women's Royal Australian Air Force (WRAAF) was formed in 1950, after the success of women serving in the Air Forces had been demonstrated by the Women's Auxiliary Australian Air Force (WAAAF). The first recruits began training on 30 January 1951, with Wing Officer Doris Carter as the service's director. Group Officer Lois Pitman succeeded her in 1960, followed by Group Officer Dawn Parsloe in 1972. In 1972, the service achieved a pay scale equal to the male service. In 1977, the WRAAF was absorbed into the RAAF.
