= Women's Auxiliary Australian Air Force =

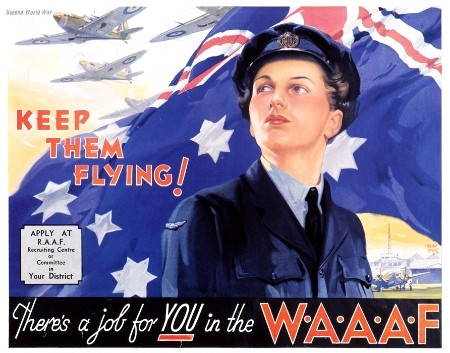
- WAAAF recruiting poster
- Active: 1941–47
- Country: Australia
- Branch: Royal Australian Air Force
- Type: Women's service
- Engagements: World War II

Commanders
- Notable commanders: Mary Bell (1941); Clare Stevenson (1941–46)

The Women’s Auxiliary Australian Air Force (WAAAF) was the first and largest Australian wartime service available to women, outside nursing, during the Second World War. Parliament, and the Chief of the Air Staff, officially established the WAAAF in March 1941. The development of the WAAAF aimed to release male personnel serving in Australia for service overseas. The WAAAF was eventually disbanded in December 1947.

== History ==
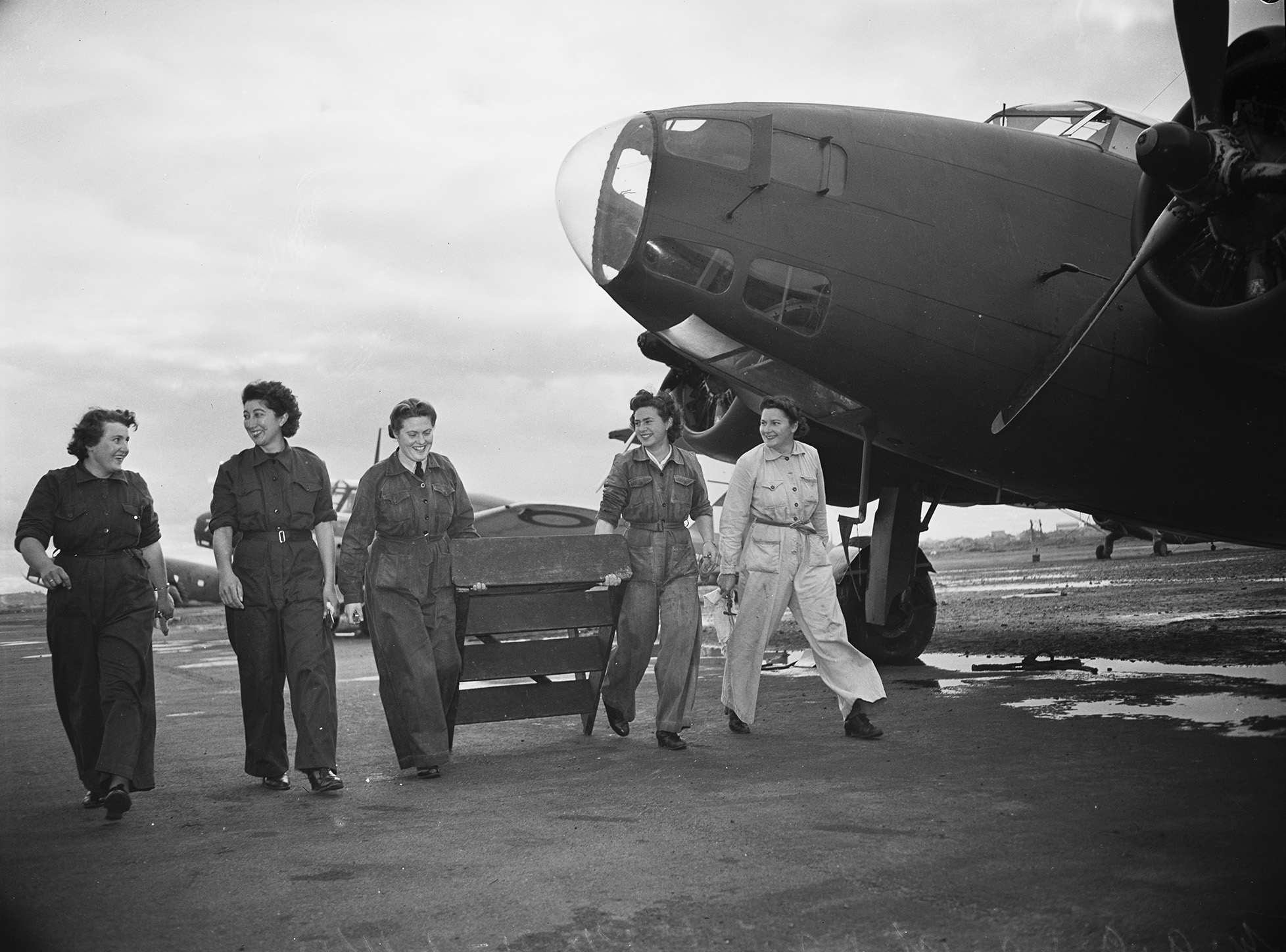
W.A.A.A.F technicians, Mascot airport, 4 July 1944.

After the declaration of World War II in 1939, the Royal Australian Air Force found an urgent need for more skilled and semi-skilled signals and maintenance personnel to fulfil its wartime commitments to the Empire Air Training Scheme (EATS) for local defence in Australia.

Petitions to establish the women’s service began in 1938 as Nazi pressure began to grow. However, there was controversy surrounding the creation of the WAAAF, with concern about women's nature and ‘natural’ domestic roles. The Minister for Defence, H.C. Thorby, had been quoted on the matter stating; “Aviation takes women out of their natural environment, the home and the training of the family.” Despite clear resistance from members of the War Cabinet and Parliament, it became clear as the war developed that the WAAAF would become a necessary addition to the Australian Armed Defence Forces.

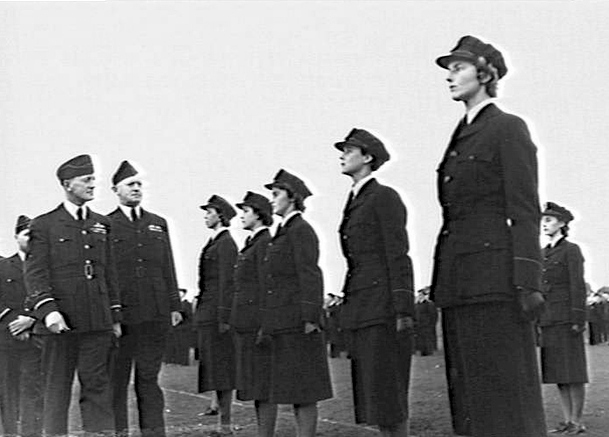
Air Vice Marshal Henry Wrigley (left, front) inspecting a graduation class of WAAAF personnel, June 1942

On 4 February 1941, the formation of an air force women's auxiliary was officially approved by the War Cabinet. It had taken 14 months of difficult discussion and opposition to achieve this final outcome. The WAAAF was officially cleared to free male personnel from their duties, allowing them to serve overseas in the war effort. The women were set to replace the roles they had left behind, and were accepted in 73 varied musterings. These included but were not limited to: telegraphists, electricians, flight mechanics, fitters, meteorological assistants, parachute folders, photo interpreters, as well as some more secretive ‘hush-hush’ units which could not be explicitly named.

In June 1941, Squadron Officer Clare Stevenson was appointed Director of the WAAAF. She took over from Flight Officer Mary Bell, wife of an RAAF group captain and former Australian Commandant of the volunteer Women's Air Training Corps, who had held temporary command for the first three months of the WAAAF's existence.

During the full course of the WAAAF's operation, from March 1941 to December 1947, the service accrued an approximate total of 27,000 members, peaking at 18,667 active airwomen in October 1944. The formation of the WAAAF set a precedent for the formation of other women's service organisations such as the Australian Women's Army Service (AWAS, est. July 1942) and the Women's Royal Australian Naval Service (WRANS, est. October 1942).

== Recruitment and Training ==
On the 28th of February 1941, authorisation for the first WAAAF Training Depot was approved. The depot was established in Malvern, Melbourne, on the campus of St Margaret's Girls School. It was decided to establish the training grounds for the WAAAF in Melbourne due to the proximity to the RAAF Headquarters, which could assist with training requirements and needs of the newly established group. Recruitment officially began on the 15th of March 1941, with the first 19 airwomen reporting for service on the 17th of the same month.

Many of the initial recruits to the WAAAF service were members of the Women's Air Training Corps (WATC), a semi-military, voluntary organisation established in April 1939. The WATC prepared women to assist or release men for active service, training the women in specialised areas such as aircraft engine maintenance, ambulance first aid, signalling, and the driving and maintenance of cars and trucks. When the WAAAF was announced, many experienced WATC members transitioned directly into the new service.

Throughout the course of the auxiliary service's operations, there were a total of four WAAAF Training Depots nationally, located in Victoria, New South Wales, and Western Australia. These depots were moved or changed as the number of WAAAF members grew, the largest being in Preston, where a Physical and Recreation Wing was created to assist with drill training. The depot had trained a total of 9,854 women by the 19th of October 1945.

The women were trained to undertake various trades, undergoing training involving telecommunication and wireless operation, aircraft maintenance and mechanics, armament fitting and parachute packing, administrative, cooking, and intelligence roles, and physical and recreational training. All 27,000 WAAAF members were trained for these roles until the WAAAF disbanded in 1947.

== Aboriginal and Torres Strait Islander Women ==
As of 2021 the Australian War Memorial has added the names of 69 Aboriginal and Torres Strait Islander women to the list of Second World War service members. Across the auxiliary services such as the AWAS, WRANS, and the WAAAF, 34 First Nations women are known to have served; however, that number is likely much higher.

Government regulations officially prohibited enlistment of people not from European backgrounds; however, due to the heavy demands of war, individuals' background and heritage were often overlooked in favour of sustaining an able-bodied workforce. In the women's auxiliary services, ethnic background was not recorded at all. However, the lack of recorded ethnicity in these services means the exact total of Aboriginal and Torres Strait Islander women who served in the war effort and WAAAF remains uncertain.

Indigenous women's participation in the war effort allowed them to move past the limited domestic service options available to them in their civilian lives, typical of the assimilation era. Elizabeth (Betty) Pike is one such example, having concealed her First Nations background to enlist in the WAAAF. Pike went on to be trained as a mechanic, learning the skills required to fix aircraft engines, even accompanying planes on their test flights.

The ability for First Nations women to enlist in the armed forces was significant for the opportunities it provided, allowing them in later life to use their improved social position, new skills and education to work towards reforming the constraints of assimilation, and the status of Indigenous people in Australian society.

== Wages, Compensation and Repatriation Benefits ==
Appropriate financial and funding requirements at the formation of the WAAAF were brought into debate by bureaucrats and members of the Australian Air Board. Prior to WAAAF servicewomen being banned from overseas service, it was decided that repatriation and compensation rates be set to a maximum of £500, paid to dependants in the event of a servicewoman's death or injury on duty. Because only single women were chosen to be recruited for the service, the likelihood of having to pay the compensation or repatriation rates was greatly minimised.

The initial draft on funding rates for the WAAAF was much higher than the revised and published version. In the first draft, the WAAAF ration and subsistence allowance was set to be on the same funding scale as the RAAF Nursing Service, travel allowances for WAAAF officers were matched at the same rates as a lower-scale nurse allowances, and all aircraftwomen and NCOs were proposed to receive identical travel allowances as male Other Ranks. This draft was subsequently revised upon advice from C.V Kellway, a Finance Member of the Air Board, who claimed the WAAAF allowances were far too high when put in comparison with other female trades. The allowances and squadron officer pay rates were then reduced; uniform allowances were updated; undergarments were set to be purchased individually by WAAAF members instead of issued, and squadron officers were set to receive less than the originally agreed two-thirds of the corresponding male rank; instead they were to be paid just above the wages of a senior nurse.

These published rates prompted questions about equal pay for women, which were discussed in the House of Representatives. Because of the debate over women's wages, the Air Board decided to review the WAAAF issue in April and May, 1941.

It was decided that the existing pay conditions for the service women were reasonable, especially when the WAAAF basic rates were compared with rates paid to civilian women in similar trades, such as domestic and clerical work. The work undertaken by women in more skilled disciplines was not considered in the wage review.

The standard was then set; women would be paid either half or two-thirds the rates of their male counterparts, in accordance with civilian rates for women, rather than create service rates for women. However, discontent continued with these conditions, and equal pay for women was discussed throughout the WAAAF, and after its disbandment in 1947. Further breakdown of WAAAF service women's pay can be found under Ranks.

== Ranks ==
WAAAF Rank	Equivalent RAAF Rank	Daily Pay (in shilling/pence)
Commandant-in-Chief	Air Marshal	Unknown
Air Chief Commandant	Air Vice Marshal	Unknown
Air Commandant	Air Commodore	Unknown
Group Officer	Group Captain	24/6
Wing Officer	Wing Commander	22/-
Squadron Officer	Squadron Leader	19/6
Flight Officer	Flight Lieutenant	17/-
Section Officer	Flying Officer	13/6
Assistant Section Officer	Pilot Officer	12/4
Under Officer	Warrant Officer	Subject to group system (see below)
Flight Sergeant	Flight Sergeant	Subject to group system
Sergeant	Sergeant	Subject to group system
Corporal	Corporal	Subject to group system
Leading Aircraftwoman	Leading Aircraftwoman	Subject to group system
Aircraftwoman	Aircraftwoman	Subject to group system

=== Group System ===
The WAAAF used a group system based on occupation to determine the pay of NCOs and non-officers.

Group	Occupations	Daily Pay (in shilling/pence)
1	Draughtswoman, laboratory technician, Link trainer instructress, meteorological assistant, X-ray technician	6/8
2	Armourer, cinema operator, dental mechanic, fabric worker, flight mechanic, flight rigger, hygiene inspector, instrument repairer, painter, photographer, radar operator, telegraphist, wireless assistant	6/8
3	Accounting machine operator, caterer, clerk general, clerk pay, clerk stores, cypher assistant, dental orderly, driver motor transport, equipment assistant, fabric worker's assistant, hairdresser, meteorological charter, nursing orderly, postal assistant, recorder, tailoress	6/-
4	Canteen stewardess, clerk, clerk librarian, clerk medical assistant, clerk signals, clerk stores assistant, radio telephony operator, service policewoman, sick quarter attendant, telephone operator, teleprinter operator, tracer, under officer, disciplinary	5/-
5	Aircrafthand, anti-gas instructress, armament assistant, cook's assistant, drill instructress, gardener, office orderly, postal orderly, stewardess, storeshand, trainee	4/4

== See also ==
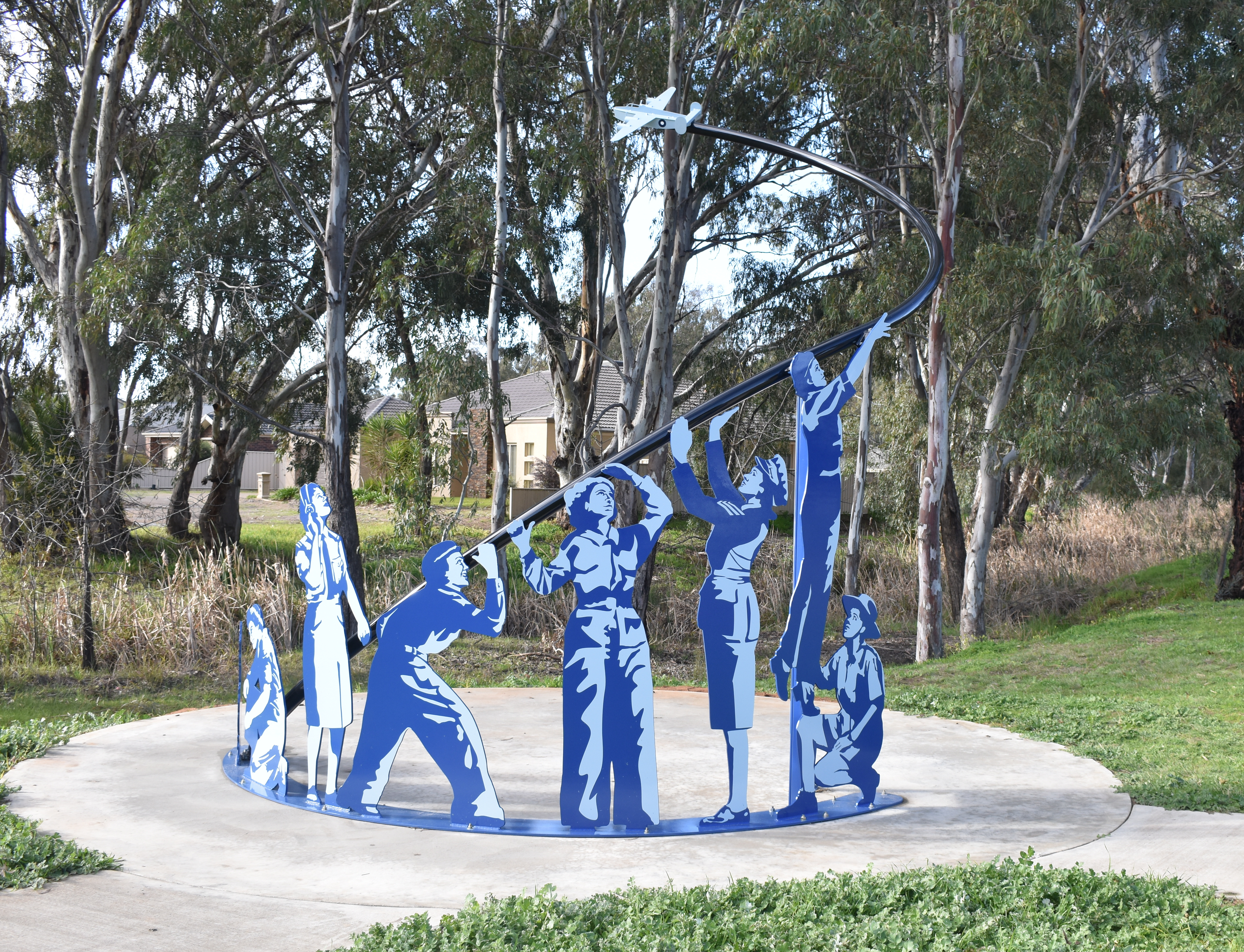
Sculpture in Tocumwal recognising the servicewomen of the WAAAF, July 2021

- Women in World War II
  - Women's Auxiliary Air Force – UK example established 1939
  - Australian women during World War II
    - Australian Women's Land Army
    - Australian Women's Army Service
    - Women's Royal Australian Naval Service
    - Royal Australian Naval Nursing Service
    - Royal Australian Air Force Nursing Service
- Women in warfare and the military (1945–99)
  - Women's Royal Australian Air Force
