= Women's National Emergency Legion =

Australian female auxiliary and training organization

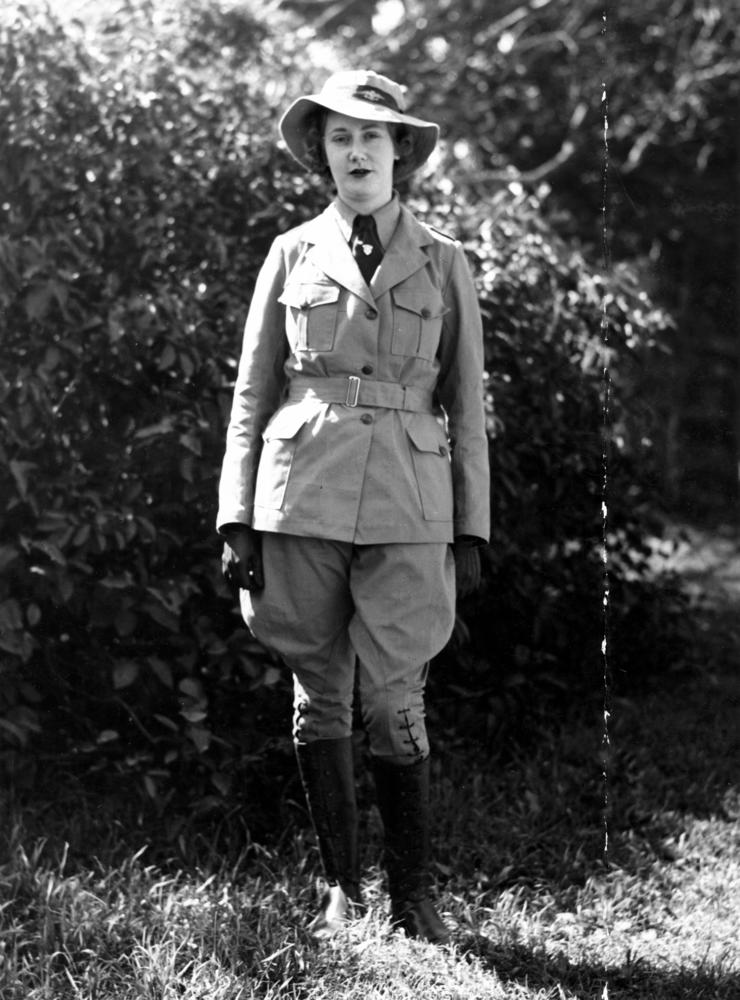
- A member of the Women's National Emergency Legion Horse Transport unit in Brisbane during September 1939
- Active: 1938–1947?
- Country: Australia
- Type: Paramilitary auxiliary and training organisation
- Patron: Enid Lyons

Commanders
- Notable commanders: Helen Ryan

The Women's National Emergency Legion (WNEL) was an Australian female auxiliary and training organisation of the World War II-era that was based in Brisbane. It was established in 1938 and provided volunteers with training in first aid and other skills which were seen as being relevant to Australia's war effort. Following the outbreak of the Pacific War members of the organisation were attached to the US military units in Australia as transport drivers and clerks. They also undertook mine watching and other tasks. The organisation ceased to exist in or about 1947.

== History ==
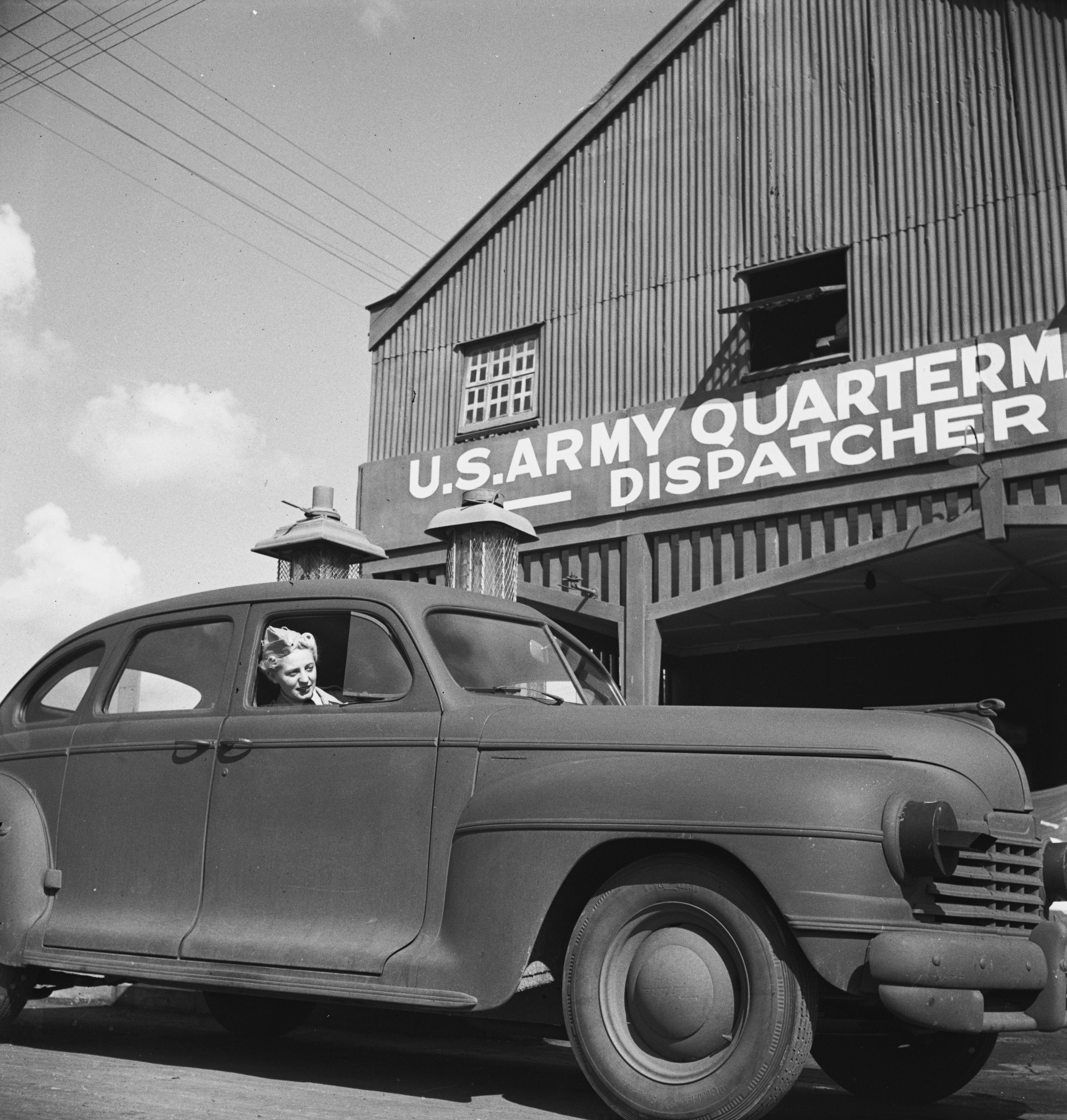
Women's National Emergency Legion driver, with US army car, Australia, 1942

The WNEL was formed in September 1938 at a meeting in Brisbane chaired by Helen Ryan, who continued as the organisation's leader during the war. At this meeting it was agreed that the WNEL would consist of a number of groups which would provide women with training in first aid, truck driving and other fields. The WNEL was not part of the Australian military, but cooperated with the Department of Defence. In January 1939 the Sydney Morning Herald reported that the WNEL accepted only women of British ancestry as members. At this time Dame Enid Lyons was the patron of the Legion and its advisory committee included the Premier of Queensland, Forgan Smith, and the Lord Mayor of Brisbane, Alfred James Jones. The WNEL was also affiliated with the National Council of Women.

In March 1939 Ryan claimed that 1000 women were taking part in weekly training sessions run by the Legion. At this time the WNEL's first aid and home nursing unit had been divided into six sections and its transport unit was organised into several companies. The Legion adopted a system of military ranks under which new recruits were designated privates, members in charge of a training function were lieutenants and the woman in charge of a branch had the title of 'commandant'. From January 1939 the WNEL included an air wing which provided training in aircraft maintenance at Archerfield Aerodrome. This wing was led by Mary Bell, who was among Australia's first female pilots as well as the first Australian woman to qualify as a ground engineer. During July, Bell and the other members of the air wing left the Legion as they believed that the organisation would not help them to meet their objective to serve as aircraft maintainers during wartime; on the 17th of the month they formed the Women's Air Training Corps (WATC), and elected Bell its commander.

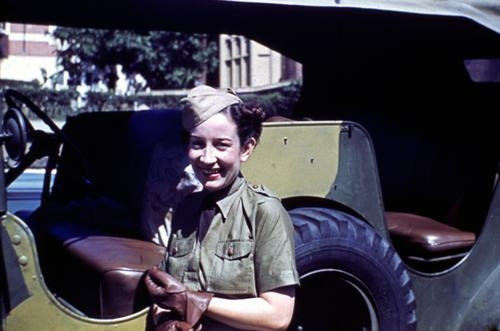
A member of the WNEL who was attached to the US Army as a driver during 1942

By April 1940 the WNEL had 51 branches in rural areas of Queensland as well as a large branch in Brisbane. As at May that year, the Legion was organised into a first aid and home nursing auxiliary, a transport division (which included horse and mechanised transport units) a land workers' section, a communication unit, despatch riders, a cooking unit and the air wing section. By July 1940 there were six different organisations training women for war work in the Brisbane region. Ryan and the members of the other organisations rejected a proposal made by The Courier-Mail that the six organisations be combined, however. At this time the WNEL had 4,000 members, of whom 1,600 were located in Brisbane, and included a transport section and an air unit. It also provided training in first aid, field cooking, physical fitness and radio communications. At about this time the WNEL also became affiliated with the British First Aid Nursing Yeomanry. The WNEL and other war-related women's organisations prominently participated in the 1941 Brisbane Exhibition. In late 1941 General Thomas Blamey, the commander of the Australian Imperial Force, stated that Australian women should prepare to work in the national economy rather than train to be dispatch riders or signalers. In response, Ryan argued that "The whole situation will be changed if the enemy attacks our shores. Then women would have to be utilised in many more ways than seems likely at present. So we'll go on training".

Some members of the WNEL took a more active role in the war following the outbreak of the Pacific War. From March 1942 WNEL volunteers watched for naval mines in the Brisbane River under the command of the Royal Australian Navy. Members of the Legion also participated in the Volunteer Air Observers Corps. By 1943 the WNEL included a Motor Transport Corps and clerical staff assigned to help United States military units in Australia. Women who volunteered for these roles could choose to not be posted outside of their home area. At this time the WNEL's headquarters was located in Adelaide Street, Brisbane. Later in the war WNEL members also served as drivers for Dutch and British military personnel in Queensland. WNEL drivers were paid between £5 and £10 per week.

In May 1946 Ryan told a Courier Mail journalist that the WNEL would continue to operate, though a decision had not been made on what its functions would be. The WNEL was active as late as October 1947. Ryan was appointed a Member of the Order of the British Empire (MBE) in June 1955 for founding and leading the WNEL during World War II.

== See also ==
- Women in the Australian military
