= Looker (disambiguation) =

Looker is a 1981 American science-fiction film written and directed by Michael Crichton.

Looker or Lookers may also refer to:

== Music ==
- "Looker", the theme song to the film Looker performed by Sue Saad, later covered by Kim Carnes on the 1982 album Voyeur
- "Lookers", a song by American rock band the Menzingers from the 2017 album After the Party

== Other uses ==
- Looker (character), a character in the DC Universe
- Looker (company), an American business intelligence software company
- Looker (surname)
- A character in the Pokémon universe
- Lookers, a car dealership chain in the United Kingdom and Ireland
