= Bankstown Lidcombe Hospital =

Medical facility in New South Wales, Australia

Bankstown-Lidcombe Hospital
- South Western Sydney Local Health District
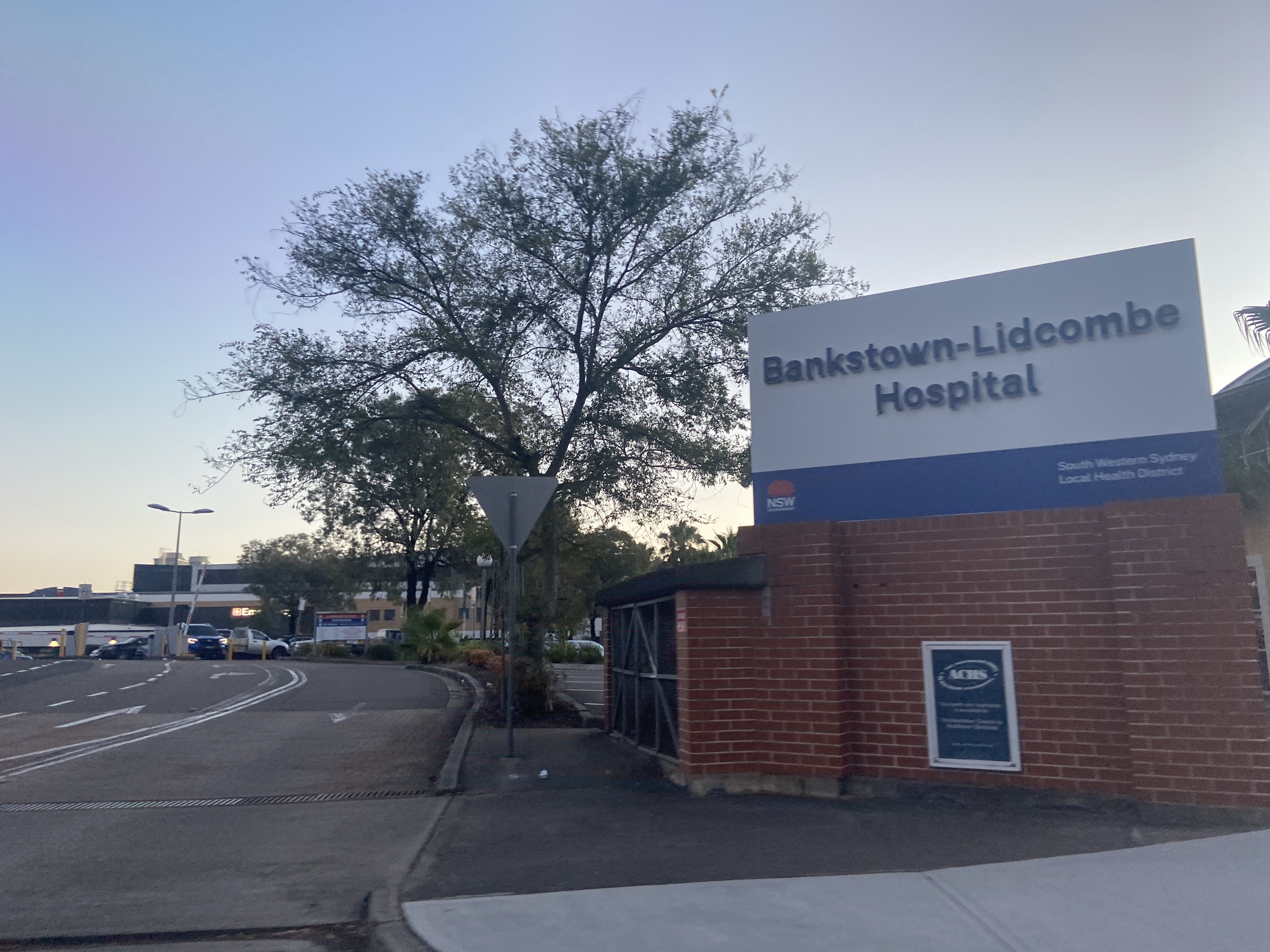
- Entrance to Bankstown-Lidcombe Hospital

Geography
- Location: Bankstown, New South Wales, Australia
- Coordinates: 33°55′58″S 151°01′16″E

Organisation
- Care system: Public Medicare (AU)
- Type: District General, Teaching
- Affiliated university: UNSW Sydney
- Network: NSW Health

Services
- Emergency department: Yes
- Beds: 454

History
- Founded: 1996

Links
- Website: Official Website
- Lists: Hospitals in Australia

Bankstown-Lidcombe Hospital is a teaching hospital with tertiary affiliations to the University of New South Wales, University of Sydney and Western Sydney University providing a wide range of general medical and surgical services and sub-specialty services to the Canterbury-Bankstown community. It is part of South Western Sydney Local Health District.

Bankstown-Lidcombe Hospital was built next to the former Bankstown Hospital which opened in 1957, This was later demolished. It became part of the South Western Sydney Local Health District in January 2011 following National Health Reform replacing the former Sydney South West Area Health Service.

== History ==
In 1885, the Government of New South Wales planned to open a youth detention centre for boys on land in Rookwood. In 1892, it was instead opened as Rookwood Asylum for the Aged and Infirm, housing elderly and impoverished men. Initially, these men applied to live at the asylum, where they were given cheap meals and board, and contributed to its upkeep. By 1913, the asylum changed its status from a public charity to a public health institution, reflecting that almost half of its inhabitants were admitted on medical grounds. In 1927, the site was renamed Lidcombe State Hospital and Home; it ceased accepting new asylum inmates in the 1930s.

In the 1950s and '60s, the hospital underwent a series of small renovations, adding new recreation, cooking and dining facilities, and a church. In 1966, it began admitting women and was renamed Lidcombe Hospital. The site opened a community day hospital in 1967, before quickly expanding and becoming a teaching hospital for the University of Sydney. Specialising in advanced geriatric nursing training, it continued to increase its training and research facilities throughout the 1970s and '80s.

Plans for a district hospital in Bankstown had been considered as early as 1914, though the breakout of World War I and the effects of the Great Depression in Australia delayed construction considerably. The Bankstown District Hospital Movement began fundraising again in 1936, initially raising £13,000 to purchase land. In 1938, the Governor of New South Wales approved the hospital's development and a hospital board was elected. Development was again interrupted—this time by World War II—but the hospital board and the Bankstown and Canterbury Labor Party campaigned for a separate local outpatient clinic while the development of the district hospital was still ongoing. In May 1944, the Bankstown Outpatients Department opened with a limited service, provided by one or two nurses, with occasional support from a visiting doctor.

Following several land purchases and false starts, the Bankstown District Hospital first opened on 7 September 1957 on an eight-acre site known as Gloriana Estate. The outpatients clinic moved to this site in 1960. By 1963, the hospital added an emergency department. In May 1966, the hospital was renamed Bankstown Hospital, and a new two-storey building was developed, as well as new operating theatres. That same year, the Bankstown Hospital became a teaching hospital for the University of New South Wales. In 1976, the hospital opened a new administration building and the Banks House Psychiatric Unit. In 1980, the hospital also opened an intensive care unit, a cardiac care unit, and a chapel.

From 5 March 1992, Bankstown Hospital and Lidcombe Hospital were merged, gradually transferring the latter's services to the Bankstown site. The new Bankstown Lidcombe Hospital reopened on 26 October 1996 with 454 beds.

== Incidents ==
=== 2016 nitrous oxide intoxication ===
In July 2016, Liberal Party minister Jillian Skinner tasked the Ministry of Health to open an investigation into the hospital after a newborn baby boy died and a baby girl suffered brain damage after they were both exposed to nitrous oxide gas that had mistakenly been piped through an oxygen outlet. It was found that a neonatal resuscitation outlet in one operating room had been installed incorrectly. Labor Party health spokesman Walt Secord insisted on Skinner authorising an independent investigation, while fellow legislator Luke Foley called for her resignation as Health Minister after it was revealed that Skinner attended the Helpmann Awards ceremonies soon after news reports about the baby boy's death in the hospital became known.

Gas supplier BOC agreed to co-operate fully with any investigation while conducting their own inquiry into the mishap. Around the same time, a 46-year-old Iraqi-born refugee who had been a patient at the hospital committed suicide in Banks House, the hospital's psychiatric ward. Minister for mental health Pru Goward announced that there would be an investigation into the circumstances of the woman's death at the hospital, although no foul play was suspected in the case.

It was later determined that renovations of the ward in 1996 had led to a nitrous oxide pipe being mislabeled, which could have been corrected through proper testing. In April 2020, Judge Wendy Strathdee exonerated BOC of any wrongdoing, while finding installation contractor Christopher Turner guilty of faking testing records, in which he falsely declared that the oxygen pipe carried "100 per cent" oxygen.

=== February 2025 nurses incident ===
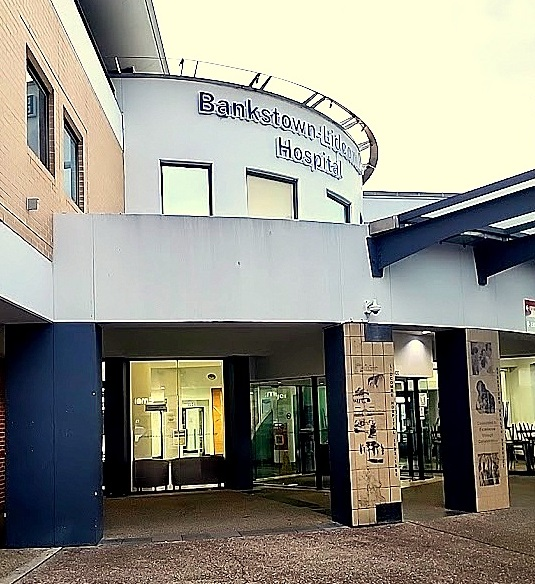
The hospital's main entrance

On 12 February 2025, a video chat between Israeli influencer Max Veifer and two nurses led to widespread criticism and a police investigation, after the nurses said they would kill Israeli patients and refuse to treat them. After learning Veifer was Israeli, the male nurse said he would go to Hell. The female nurse said he would face a "horrible death" for being in the Israel Defence Force, and later said she would refuse to treat Israeli patients and would kill them. The male nurse said he had already killed several Israeli patients.

The nurses had their licences suspended across Australia. The male nurse said the incident had been "just a joke" and was "a misunderstanding". His solicitor said the nurse had sent an apology to Veifer and the Jewish community "as a whole", and was "trying to make amends". After an internal investigation, the hospital said there was no evidence of "adverse outcomes" for patients.

NSW Police officers have conducted investigations into the incident and are working with Veifer to present a witness statement admissible in the Australian court, since the video was made in Israel. On 26 February, the female nurse was charged with three federal offences: threatening violence, using a carriage service to threaten to kill, and using a carriage service to menace, harass or offend. She was also banned from social media and from leaving Australia. On 5 March, the male nurse was charged with two offences: using a carriage service to menace, harass or cause offence, and possession of a prohibited drug (morphine). On 18 March, the lawyer for the male nurse sought to exclude Veifer's video as evidence, claiming his client had been recorded without his knowledge.

In early July 2025, it was reported that the two nurses had been banned for two years from working with National Disability Insurance Scheme (NDIS) participants, which came into effect on 9 May. In mid-September 2025, prosecutors withdrew the female nurse's charge of using a carriage service to threaten to kill.

On 2 February 2026, the two defendants were arraigned at the New South Wales District Court, where they pleaded not guilty to the charges they were facing. A pre-trial hearing is expected to take place on 1 June, with the defendants' trial expected to commence on 31 August. On 23 June, District Court of New South Wales Justice Michael McHugh ruled in favour of the defendants' lawyers motion to exclude the video and other recordings of the defendants' conversation with Veifer. The defence team had argued that the video footage breached New South Wales' legislation preventing the recording of private conversations.

The prosecution appealed the District Court's decision to the New South Wales Court of Appeal. On 31 July 2026, the Court of Appeal overturned the District Court's decision and allowed the prosecution to admit the video footage as evidence. In mid-August 2026, the trial of the nurses was delayed to allow the defence time to consider Crown evidence submitted by Middle East analyst Rodger Shanahan.

==== Responses ====
The incident was widely condemned as antisemitic, including by Australian Prime Minister Anthony Albanese, NSW Premier Chris Minns, NSW Health Minister Ryan Park, NSW Police Commissioner Karen Webb, and other healthcare workers. Liberal MP Julian Leeser said Australia's Jewish community was "living in fear" of rising antisemitism, and Alex Ryvchin of the Executive Council of Australian Jewry said the video was "utterly sickening to watch".

The New South Wales Nurses and Midwives' Association held a demonstration outside NSW parliament to condemn "all forms of racism, bigotry and hatred, including acts of antisemitism and Islamophobia". In the aftermath of the incident, another nurse at Bankstown Hospital said she had previously raised concerns about antisemitism at the hospital after the October 7 attacks.

A coalition of Islamic organizations, including Hizb Ut-Tahrir and The Muslim Vote, released a joint statement that said media outlets and political leaders had provided "active diplomatic and journalistic cover for ongoing crimes by the Zionists" and described the public response as "selective outrage" and "weaponization of antisemitism". Western Australian Senator Fatima Payman described the nurses' remarks as "terrible", but said they were being treated as though they had "committed the absolute worst crime imaginable".

== See also ==
- List of hospitals in Australia
- Antisemitism in health care
