= Georgina McCready =

Australian nurse and trade unionist (1888-1980)

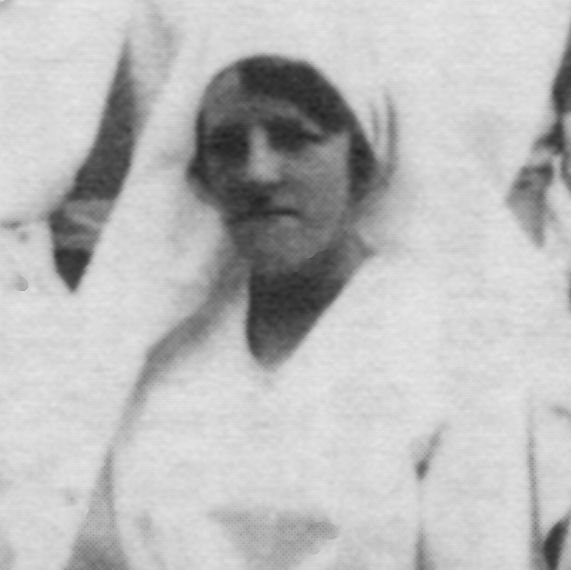
- Born: 17 December 1888; Greenock, Renfrewshire, Scotland
- Died: 16 September 1980 (aged 91); Leichhardt, New South Wales, Australia
- Occupation: nurse
- Spouse: Samuel McCready (m. 1932; died 1940)

Georgina McCready (née Johnstone; 17 December 1888 – 16 September 1980), MBE, was a founding member of the New South Wales Nurses Association (NSWNA) in 1931 and the New South Wales College of Nursing (NSWCN) in 1949. She was the founding president for the college from 1949 to 1950 and chaired the first meeting of the provisional council for the college. Also, McCready was one of the first supervisory sisters in the NSW Department of Health in 1929. The McCready Scholarship was established in 1954 by the NSWNA in her honour. She was appointed MBE (Member of the British Empire, (Civil) 8 June 1963 for services to the nursing profession. It was during her term as a supervisory nurse inspecting hospital standards for the NSW Board of Health in 1929, that Georgina found the low salaries and poor working and living conditions for nurses throughout NSW. She found that, many hospitals fell below Nurses Registration Board (NRB) requirements and nurses had no industrial cover. Supported by Jessie Street and in partnerships with Iono Nowland (assistant to the registrar of the NRB) Georgina formed the NSW Nurses Association at an emergency meeting 27 March 1931. The 1931 Executive included Nowland as president and Johnstone as honorary secretary.

== Career ==
McCready and her sister Jessie worked in several hospitals after arriving in Australia with their parents and siblings in 1914 and garnered substantial knowledge and experience of nursing, hospital administration and the broader health sector of NSW. Both were required to sit examinations with the Australian Trained Nurses Association (ATNA) in 1914 before they could continue with their nursing careers, and they completed midwifery at Crown Street Women’s Hospital, Sydney in 1922. Georgina also completed her Mothercraft Certificate at the Tresillian Centre, Petersham in 1928.

Georgina was at the Renwick Hospital for Infants in 1915-1916 and sub-matron at St George Cottage Hospital from January 1916. By 1920 Georgina Johnstone had been appointed Matron at Cessnock Hospital where she remained to 1923 leaving to take up the position of Matron at Maitland Hospital. Georgina also worked for a time at Broken Hill & District Hospital.

She was described in the local press as follows:

During her term of service at the hospital Matron Johnstone has won for herself the reputation of a capable and efficient nurse, and a tactful disciplinarian. Her departure will be keenly regretted not only by the medical and nursing profession and the committee, but by the patients and the numerous friends she has made in the town and district.

McCready was praised in March 1923 when selected as Matron at Maitland Hospital, despite one of the Hospital Committee members, Mr W J Enright, objecting to her appointment He believed that as she was not a 'war nurse' her appointment was contrary to the Returned Soldiers and Sailor's Employment Act which gave preference to nurses who had enlisted and served during the war. McCready had already resigned from her previous position at Cessnock Hospital at this point and had been appointed and accepted the position at Maitland Hospital. She also wrote to the committee informing them that she had enlisted in the Australian Forces and was located at Randwick Military Hospital for some months in 1914. However Mr Enright continued with his objections until E. B. Harkness, the Under Secretary in the Chief Secretary's Department, ruled that Matron Johnstone's appointment could not be upset.

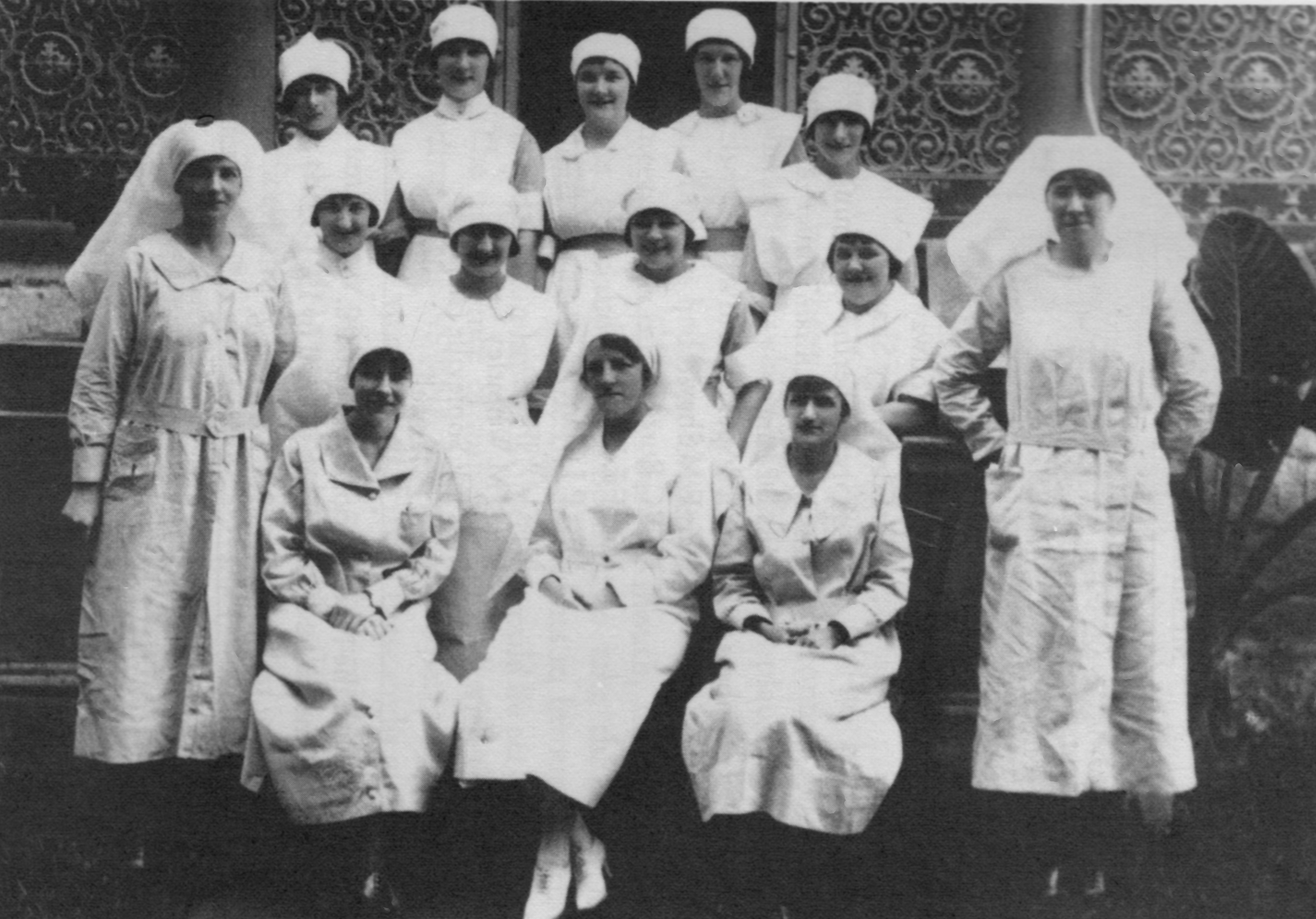
Matron Georgina Johnstone (later McCready) seated front row, with nurses from Maitland Hospital of which she was matron from 1923 to 1926

It was after her husband’s death, and her absence from her nursing career for the duration of her marriage, that she was recruited for her role as a supervisory Nurse with the NSW Board of Health, this a catalyst for her on the next part of her professional life with the NSW College of Nursing and the NSW Nurses Association. Georgina did not return to hospital nursing but immersed herself into a prominent new role of trade unionist and activist for the profession of nursing as well as reformer, policy shaper and founding member of both the nurses’ union and the New South Wales College of Nursing (now part of Australian College of Nursing. The others were Muriel Knox Doherty, RRC, Agnes Mary Lions, OBE, FCN (NSW), 1908-1992 and Margaret Frances Guy (nee Looker), OBE.

== Personal life ==
Georgina Johnstone was the eldest daughter of George Johnstone and Margaret Gibson and was born at the industrial port town of Greenock, Renfrewshire, Scotland in 1888. George Johnstone moved the family to Glasgow when Georgina was in her early twenties and she worked first at a chartered accountant office. She also enrolled at evening college to learn shorthand. She then enrolled in general nursing at the newly open Eastern district Hospital, graduating in 1912 when she was 24.

Georgina and her father visited relatives in New South Wales in 1913, and all of the Johnstone family immigrated to Australia in 1914. They would live in their house at Shorter Avenue, Dumbleton (later Beverley Hills) in Sydney thereafter. With both parents gone (George Johnstone died 1930 and Margaret in 1947) Georgina and her sisters lived for most of their lives at this address with Jessie the last one to die there in 1981 one year after Georgina in 1980. Of the five sisters only Georgina, Margaret and Jessie married. Georgina cared for her sister Margaret when she died in 1939. Over the years the sisters lived in Shorter Street and if married briefly as was Georgina for only eight years, returned to live in the family home when widowed. Georgina also kept her maiden name of Johnstone for all the time she was a registered nurse. As the sisters aged they also supported and, in turn, cared for each other.

Georgina married Samuel McCready in 1932 at St Stephens Church in Sydney. McCready was a dairy farmer at Keerrong in the local government area of Lismore. Samuel McCready died in 1940. He had been ill for some time with tuberculosis, occasioning many trips to Sydney for treatment likely with nursing support from Georgina.
