= Antisemitism in health care =

Discrimination against Jewish people in health care settings

Antisemitism in health care has been documented by scholars since before the Holocaust, during which doctors and nurses participated in atrocities against Jewish victims. Discrimination against Jews and episodes of anti-Jewish hate in health care settings have been documented through the decades.

== Medieval and early modern Europe ==
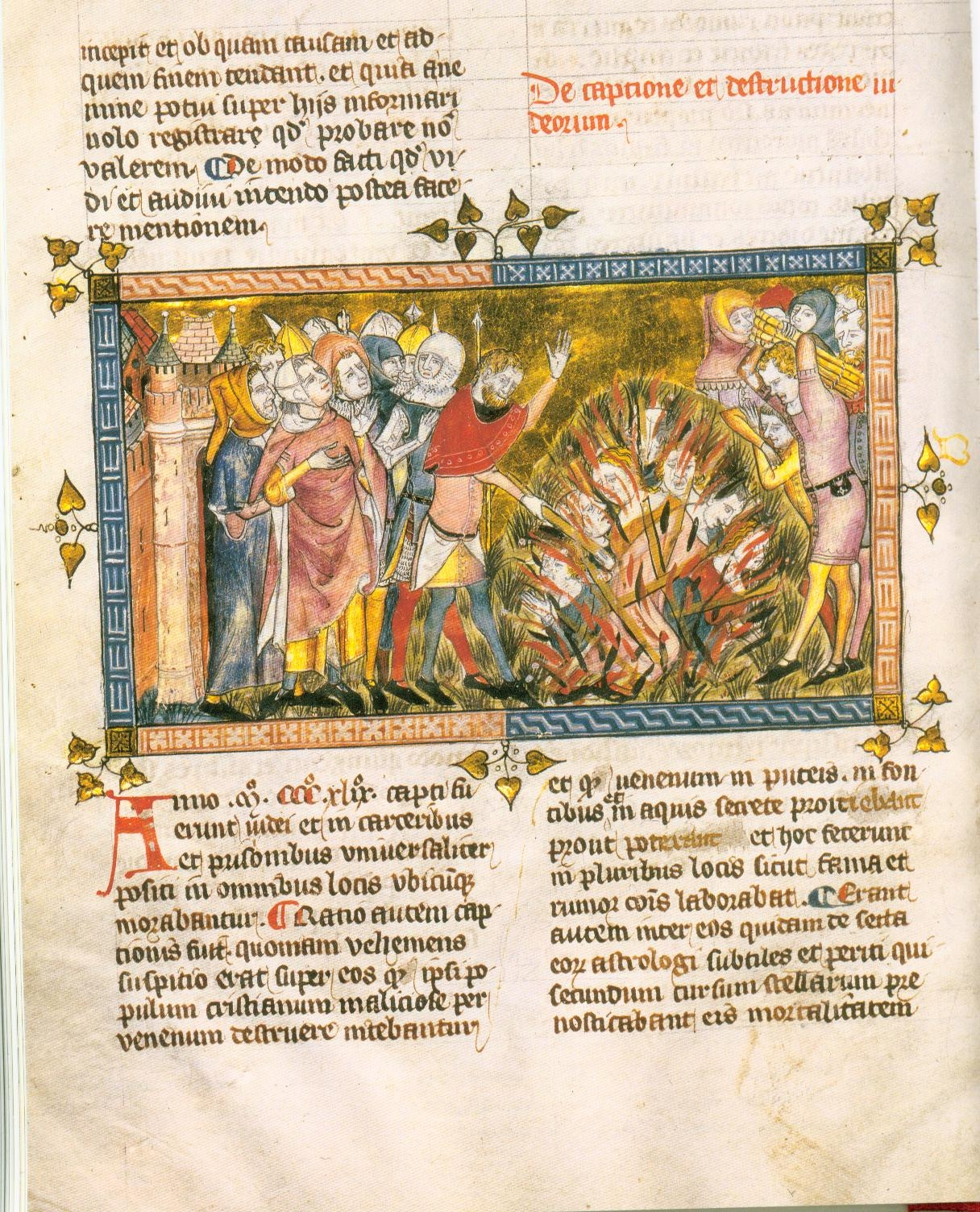
Contemporary drawing of Jews executed by immolation during the Black Death persecutions of 1350. Antiquitates Flandriae by Gilles Li Muisis (Royal Library of Belgium manuscript 1376/77).

Some antisemitic conspiracies in medieval and early modern Europe took the form of fearing Jewish (or suspected Jewish) doctors. This fear seemed to be especially strong in 17th and 18th century Iberia, with conversos (Jews who had converted to Catholicism) often being targeted. For example, the Portuguese author Vicente da Costa de Mattos, in his 1622 work Breve discurso contra a heretica perfidia do judaismo, suggests that Jewish people who had pretended to convert to Christianity were entering medicine so that they could kill Catholics. This idea was also present in other parts of early modern Europe, such as in Germany.

Jews were viewed in medieval Europe as vectors for the transmission of disease. Early modern works linked Jews to a variety of illnesses, arguing that the supposed prevalence in Jewish communities were due to the practices and conditions of the communities. Many of these ideas persisted into the 19th century. The myth of Jewish male menstruation from bleeding hemorrhoids was connected to violent beatings in their hindquarters as punishment for having crucified Jesus Christ.

== Modern period ==
=== 18th–19th century Europe ===
With the development of the fields of psychology and psychiatry, Jews were accused of an inherent predisposition to a wade array of mental illnesses. In England, Jewish men were ridiculed for penile and sexual disorders and infections, which were blamed on their supposed sexual pathology, lechery, and on their circumcision.

=== 19th–20th century North America ===
Beginning in 1854, Jewish hospitals were founded to counter discriminatory practices in medical education and physician hiring, and to address the unmet needs of poor and religiously observant Jewish patients. Quotas limiting admissions of Jews into medical schools reportedly existed in the United States from the 1920s until around 1970. Two episodes of antisemitic violence, one in 1916 and one in 1927, were connected to American medical schools during this time, both taking place in New York. In a 2025 article, Walter et al., argue there is evidence that past leaders of the American Psychological Association (APA) published antisemitic publications that promoted "scientific racism and eugenics", and that the APA have been silent on this history.

In Canada, antisemitic social and economic boycotts, along with educational quotas, have been described from the 19th through the mid-20th century. In June 1934, interns at Notre Dame Hospital in Montreal began a strike after Jewish doctor Samuel Rabinovitch was hired at the hospital; the strike ended when Rabinovitch resigned four days later.

During the AIDS crisis, Jews were accused of both manufacturing AIDS and of spreading it.

=== 20th-century Europe ===
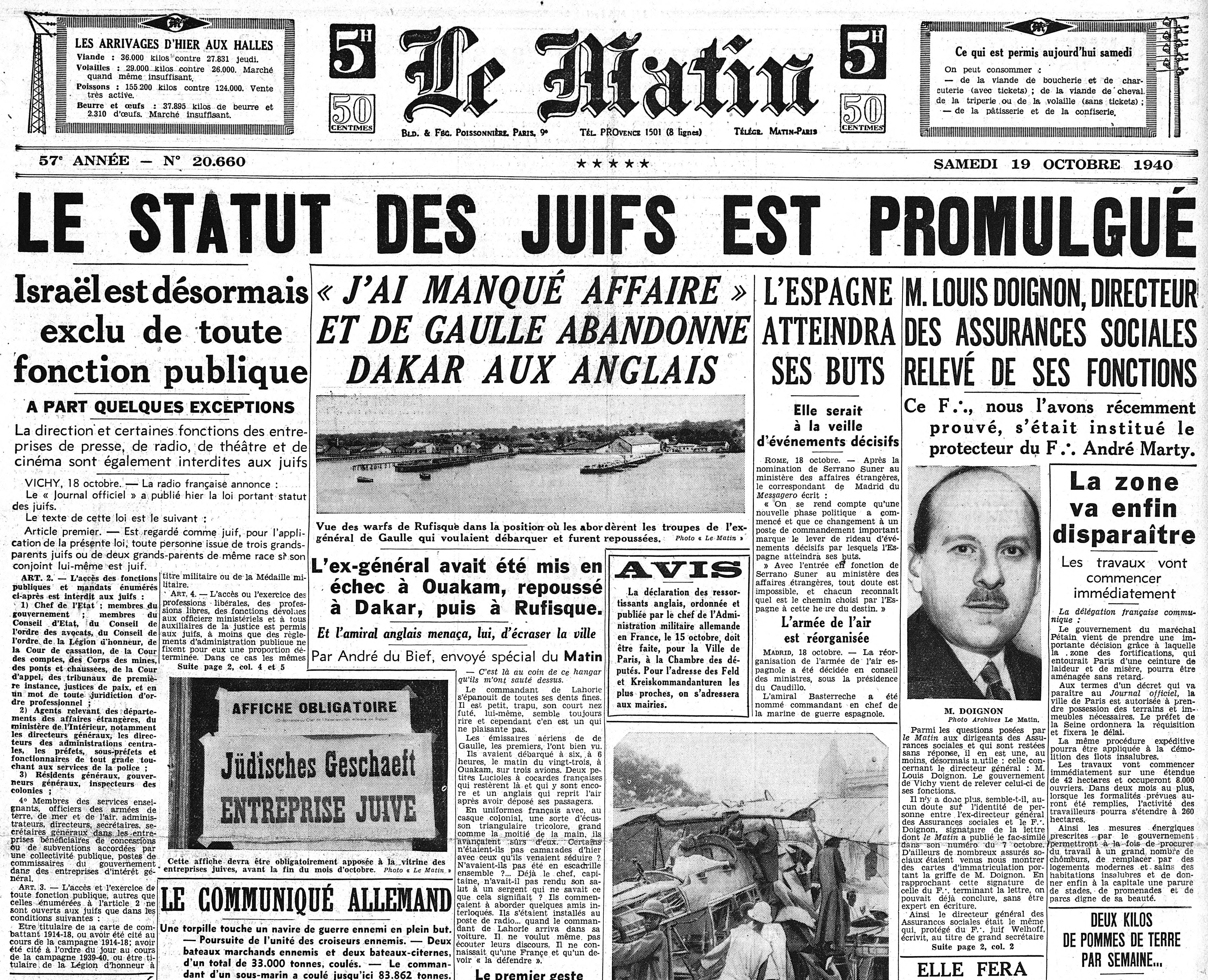
Headline of Le Matin on 19 October 1940 announcing the passage of the Jewish laws.

Older antisemitic tropes of Jews as vectors of disease continued in the 20th century, with outbreaks of typhus in labour camps in World War I attributed as a typical "Jewish disease", despite the outbreaks of typhus affecting everyone in the labour camps due to a lack of adequate sanitation, health care, and nutrition.

The fear of Jewish physicians continued to be stoked in 20th-century Germany; medical educator Hedy Wald noted that the lead-up to the Holocaust featured the persecution and ostracizing of Jewish doctors. Under the Vichy government, the Law on the status of Jews was signed by Philippe Pétain. These laws provided for a list of occupations from which Jews were barred, including medicine and related fields. The French medical journal Concours Médical detailed these measures and regularly published the names of Jewish physicians to prevent them from practicing. The Ordre des Médecins was in charge of administering these antisemitic policies in the medical field. In 1997 the Conseil national de l'Ordre des médecins issued a declaration of regret for the actions of the doctors under the Vichy regime.

From 1938 to 1944, a series of racial laws were enacted in Fascist Italy, with the main victims of these laws being Italian Jews and the African inhabitants of the Italian Empire. The laws excluded Jews from public, social, and academic life, with many Jews in medical positions being fired.

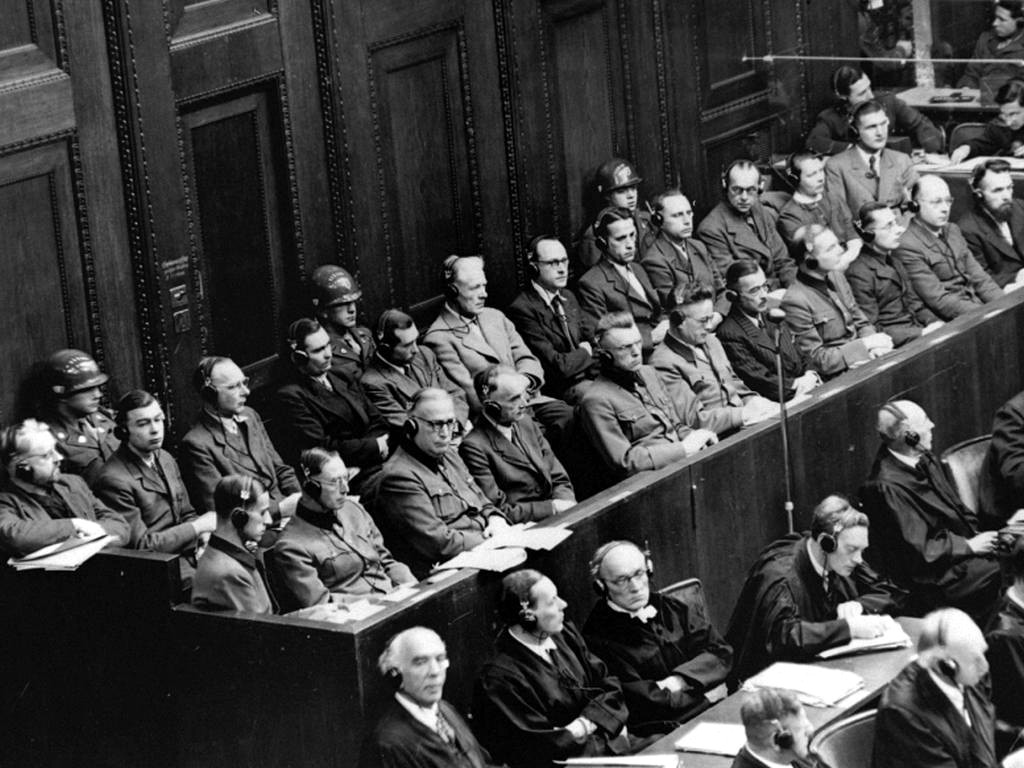
Doctors' Trial, Nuremberg, 1946–1947

Several medical eponyms connected to Nazi-affiliated doctors were coined and later considered for removal. Of the roughly 90,000 physicians who worked in Germany during Nazi rule, some 46,000 were members of the Nazi party. Alongside this, according to Michael Kater, in 1937, physicians were seven times as likely as other employed males to join the SS. After the end of World War II, United States authorities initiated the Doctors' Trial, where 20 physicians and 3 SS officials were charged for their involvement in the Aktion T4 programme and Nazi human experimentation. The trial was held before US military courts. Seven of the accused were sentenced to death by hanging, five were sentenced to life imprisonment, four were given prison sentences from 10 to 20 years, and seven were acquitted. Reis et al. argued in a 2019 article that learning about how doctors in the Nazi regime became accomplices to genocide can help medical professionals deal with ethical challenges, prejudices, and implicit bias.

In the 1950s a Soviet-sponsored anti-intellectual and antisemitic campaign was conducted under the fabricated Doctors' Plot, many prominent Soviet physicians, many of whom were Jewish, were accused of plotting to assassinate high-ranking Soviet leaders through medical malpractice. Initially sparked by a 1948 letter from a medical worker alleging suspicious diagnoses and treatments, the case gained momentum in 1951 when Ministry of State Security investigator Mikhail Ryumin accused physicians of intentionally killing top officials. These charges were part of a broader antisemitic campaign linked to Stalin's earlier purges and power struggles within the Communist Party of the Soviet Union. Arrests intensified in 1952, and a major media campaign in 1953 publicly accused the doctors of espionage and medical sabotage on behalf of Western intelligence agencies and Zionist organizations. Under torture, prisoners seized in the investigation of the alleged plot were compelled to produce evidence against themselves and their associates.

== 21st century ==
=== COVID-19 pandemic ===
Several reports documented conspiracy theories blaming Jews for "engineering and profiting from the COVID-19 pandemic". Hate groups falsely labeled Jews as "being a main vector of the virus". The US Federal Bureau of Investigation put out alerts regarding the possible threat of far-right extremists who were intentionally spreading COVID-19 misinformation which assigned blame to Jews and Jewish leaders. Flyers were spread in Germany blaming Jews for the pandemic. According to a study carried out by the University of Oxford in early 2020, nearly one-fifth of respondents in England believed to some extent that Jews were responsible for creating or spreading the virus with the motive of financial gain. Peter Hotez detailed in a 2023 journal article the convergence of anti-vaccine sentiment and antisemitism, where he reported on being targeted, this convergence was also detailed in a British cross-sectional study published in December 2023.

=== Australia ===
In March 2024, an Israeli trauma specialist was prevented from appearing as keynote speaker at a mental health conference due to a boycott campaign. Pro-Palestinian groups called for cancellation of the speech as part of an academic boycott of Israel to not "normalize oppression" and "to end complicity in Israel’s violations of International law". The Zionist Federation of Australia called the boycott antisemitic.

On 12 February 2025, a video chat between Israeli influencer Max Veifer and two nurses led to widespread criticism and a police investigation, after the nurses said they would kill Israeli patients and refuse to treat them. After learning Veifer was Israeli, the male nurse said he would go to hell. The female nurse said he would face a "horrible death" for being in the Israel Defense Force, and later said she would refuse to treat Israeli patients and would kill them. The male nurse said he had already killed several Israeli patients.

The incident was widely condemned as antisemitic, including by Australian Prime Minister Anthony Albanese, NSW Premier Chris Minns, NSW Health Minister Ryan Park, NSW Police Commissioner Karen Webb, and other healthcare workers. Liberal MP Julian Leeser said Australia's Jewish community was "living in fear" of rising antisemitism, and Alex Ryvchin of the Executive Council of Australian Jewry said the video was "utterly sickening to watch".

The nurses had their licenses suspended across Australia. The male nurse said the incident had been "just a joke" and was "a misunderstanding". His solicitor said the nurse had sent an apology to Veifer and the Jewish community "as a whole", and was "trying to make amends". After an internal investigation, the hospital said there was no evidence of "adverse outcomes" for patients.

NSW Police officers have conducted investigations into the incident and are working with Veifer to present a witness statement admissible in the Australian court, since the video was made in Israel. On 26 February, the female nurse was charged with three federal offenses: threatening violence, using a carriage service to threaten to kill, and using a carriage service to menace, harass or offend. She was also banned from social media and from leaving Australia. On 5 March, the male nurse was charged with two offenses: using a carriage service to menace, harass or cause offense, and possession of a prohibited drug.

==== Responses ====
In response to the incident, the New South Wales Nurses and Midwives' Association held a demonstration outside NSW parliament to condemn "all forms of racism, bigotry and hatred, including acts of antisemitism and Islamophobia". In the aftermath of the incident, another nurse at Bankstown Hospital said she had previously raised concerns about antisemitism at the hospital after the 7 October 2023 Hamas-led attack on Israel.

A coalition of Islamic organizations, including Hizb Ut-Tahrir and The Muslim Vote, released a joint statement that said media outlets and political leaders had provided "active diplomatic and journalistic cover for ongoing crimes by the Zionists" and described the public response as "selective outrage" and a "weaponisation of antisemitism". Western Australian Senator Fatima Payman described the nurses' remarks as "terrible" and said they were being treated as though they had "committed the absolute worst crime imaginable".

=== United States ===
After the October 7 attacks, most US medical associations did not make any public statements, which has been contrasted to supportive statements that they issued after Russian attacks on Ukraine. Ian Kingsbury and Jay Greene writing in Tablet accused numerous doctors of publicly celebrating the attacks. Subsequently, Hedy Wald, Steven Roth, and others decried medical articles which they perceived as "political indictment cloaked in academic language." They connected increasing anti-Israel rhetoric with an increasingly hostile environment for Jewish students and faculty at medical schools, with Wald characterizing a letter to US President Joe Biden from a group of doctors who worked in Gaza during the Gaza war as antisemitic, and included the wearing of keffiyehs as an antisemitic act in her studies. She cited examples of medical students and faculty tearing down hostage posters, accusing Jewish students of complicity with genocide, engaging in Holocaust distortion and inversion, and disrupting commencement ceremonies.

The president of the American Academy of Pediatrics wrote then-Secretary of State Antony Blinken a letter asking for help locating a doctor who was noted to be a member of Hamas.

House Republicans sent UCSF's Chancellor a letter to investigate "hundreds of complaints of antisemitism and/or a hostile work environment", stemming from an encampment in front of UCSF's medical center against Israel's mass killing of Gazans during the Gaza War, antisemitic graffiti, behavior by medical staff and patients including alleged "calls for violence".

In Chicago, Jewish therapists who said they would treat a Zionist patient were added to a blacklist. Trauma therapists Miri Bar-Halpern and Jaclyn Wolfman noted that some of their colleagues ignored or shunned them after the October 7 attacks, invalidated their pain after antisemitic comments, or otherwise committed "traumatic invalidation".

In a 2025 survey of 170 Jewish-identifying medical students and professionals, 75.4% reported workplace exposure to antisemitism.

The U.S. Department of Health and Human Services opened an investigation in June 2026 into the American Psychological Association following a complaint from the Louis D. Brandeis Center for Human Rights Under Law accusing the APA of being "one of the worst purveyors of anti-Semitism and extremist ideology in healthcare."

=== United Kingdom ===
After the October 7 attacks on Israel, reports of antisemitism to the General Medical Council increased 15-fold. A majority of Jewish health care providers reported having experienced antisemitic behavior at some point in their career. In the 12 months following October 7, the Jewish Medical Association submitted 28 complaints of antisemitism to the General Medical Council, JMA member and chair if the Royal Society for Public Health, Fiona Sim said she was aware of over 100 incidents, with the organization deciding to only submit 28 serious incidents. In the year before October 7, the group submitted only one complaint.

In September 2024, the Central and North West London NHS Foundation Trust withdrew a training course on antisemitism due to concerns about its content. The withdrawal was reversed by the trust's chief executive, who said that the message about the withdrawal had not gone through the "usual sign-off processes."

=== Canada ===
Quebec medical school applicants and students posted antisemitic tropes, racial slurs, praises for Nazism and Islamic State on a public social media server, with no apparent objections by other posters.

=== Fears of potential antisemitism ===
Norway's Jewish community sent a letter to health authorities expressing fears Jewish patients shared, including wearing a Star of David during medical examinations, or having their Jewish-sounding names called in waiting rooms. They noted that Norwegian medical organizations had supported boycotts against Israel and that Norway's government had refused to designate Hamas as a terrorist organization, in contrast to other Western countries.

== Corrective approaches ==
The international Lancet commission on Medicine and the Holocaust has outlined objectives for medical educators to include in curricula.

Hedy Wald advocates for 4 E's to combat antisemitism, which can be incorporated into DEI programs: education, engagement, empathy and enforcement. These include disseminating information about the historic roles of Nazi and Nazi-supporting doctors and nurses; fostering respectful dialogue and personal connections in medical communities; and establishing policies to oppose hate speech and promote nondiscrimination. Wald developed a Holocaust and medicine course at several medical campuses.

Surveys have found the lack of and the need for training programs on how to recognize and combat antisemitism for faculty, administrators, and health care professionals. The University of Toronto medical faculty created a position of Senior Advisor on Antisemitism in 2021 to support training on and reporting of antisemitism.

The American Jewish Medical Association (AJMA) was founded after the October 7 Hamas-led attacks in order to support Jewish and non-Jewish Zionists in healthcare settings as well as Zionism in these settings.

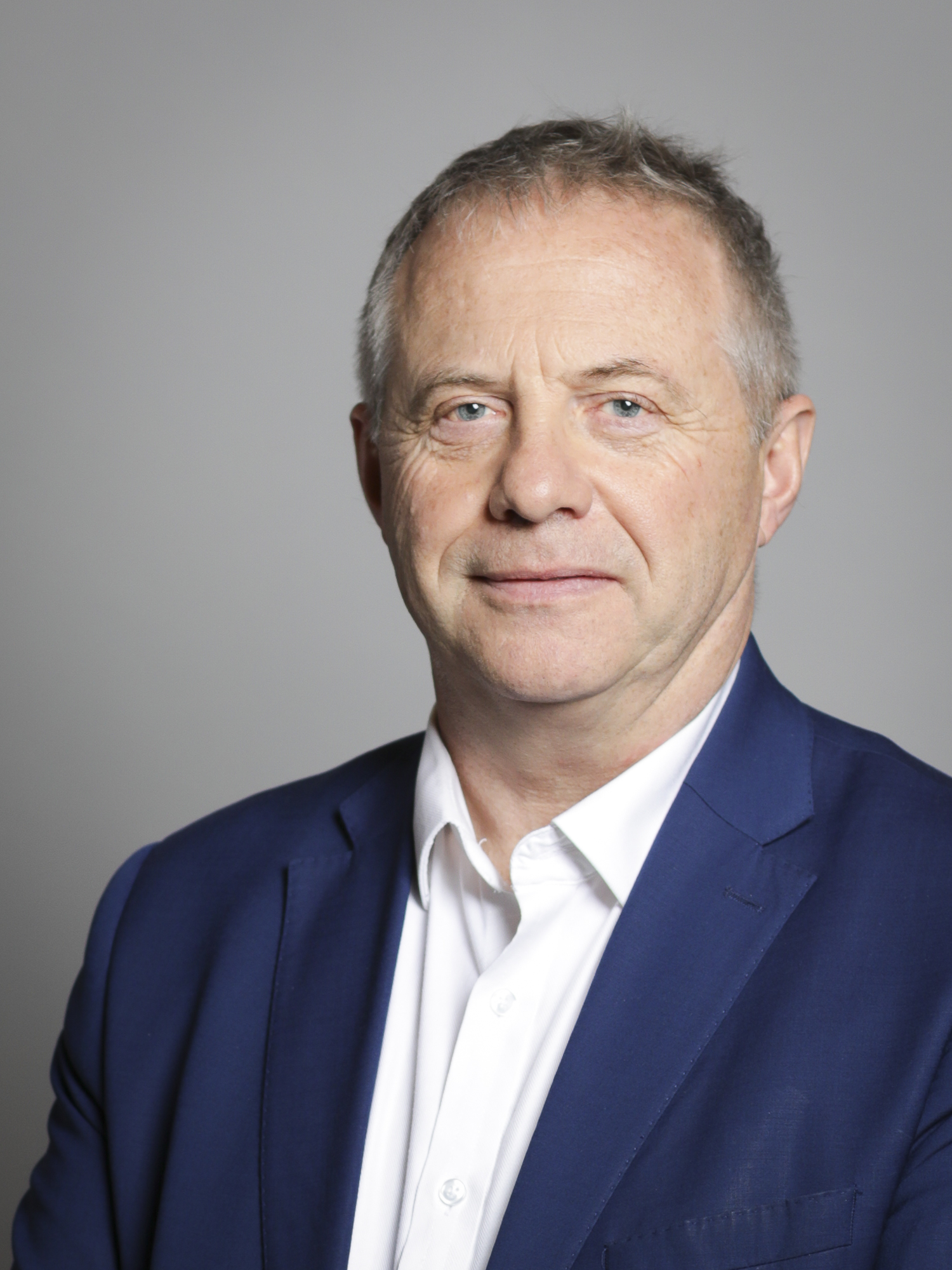
Lord John Mann the UK Government Advisor on Antisemitism

Peter Hotez has proposed "science tikkun", a bioscience policy, diplomacy, and advocacy framework focused on climate activism, pandemic prevention, vaccine development, and countering anti-science activities.

In December 2024, the UK Health Secretary Wes Streeting urged regulators to crack down on medical staff who express "racist or extremist views" about the Gaza war.

In May 2025, US lawmakers requested that the United States House Committee on Appropriations demand reports from the United States Department of Health and Human Services on antisemitism and civil rights violations in the US health care sector.

In June 2026, the UK government advisor on antisemitism John Mann provided a report that recommended that NHS staff should be banned from wearing any political badges or symbols at work. The report found evidence of "routine ostracism" of Jewish staff in the NHS, and raised concerns that Jewish people might avoid seeking help from the NHS. The chief executive of NHS England Jim Mackey accepted the recommendations and said that they would work to implement them as quickly as possible. The UK government also accepted the recommendations of the report.

== See also ==
- List of Nazi doctors
- Normalization of antisemitism
- Universities and antisemitism
- Medical racism
- Weaponization of antisemitism
