= Hedy Wald =

American medical educator and psychologist

Hedy Wald is an American medical educator and psychologist. Wald is a Clinical Professor of Family Medicine at Brown University. She is known for her Holocaust curricula and her activism against antisemitism in healthcare communities.

== Early life and education ==
Wald's father survived three concentration camps, including Auschwitz, and lost his parents and siblings in the Holocaust. Wald grew up on Long Island, New York. She obtained her B.A. from Clark University and her Ph.D. from Yeshiva University.

== Career ==
Wald directed the reflective writing curriculum at Brown University medical school. She serves as a commissioner for the international Lancet commission on Medicine and the Holocaust. She developed a Holocaust and medicine course at several campuses. Her creative writing has included her experiences as caregiver for her husband, a neurologist who self-diagnosed his lethal brain tumor at age 57.

== Activism ==
After the October 7 Hamas-led attacks on Israel, Wald objected to medical articles which she perceived as “political indictment cloaked in academic language.” She connected surging anti-Israel rhetoric with an increasingly hostile environment for Jewish students and faculty at medical schools, noting that the lead-up to the Holocaust also featured the persecution and ostracizing of Jewish doctors. Wald has characterized a letter to US President Joe Biden from a group of doctors who worked in Gaza during the Gaza war as antisemitic, and included the wearing of keffiyehs as an antisemitic act in her studies. She cited examples of medical students and faculty tearing down hostage posters, accusing Jewish students of complicity with genocide, engaging in Holocaust distortion and inversion, and disrupting commencement ceremonies.

Wald advocates for 4 E's to combat antisemitism, which can be incorporated into DEI programs: education, engagement, empathy and enforcement. These include disseminating information about the historic roles of Nazi and Nazi-supporting doctors and nurses; fostering respectful dialogue and personal connections in medical communities; and establishing policies to oppose hate speech and promote nondiscrimination.

== Awards ==
- 2014-2015 Dean's Excellence in Teaching Awards, Brown University
- 2013 Gold Humanism Foundation Harvard-Macy Scholar

== See also ==
- Antisemitism in health care
