= Muriel Knox Doherty =

Australian nurse and air force principal matron (1896–1988)

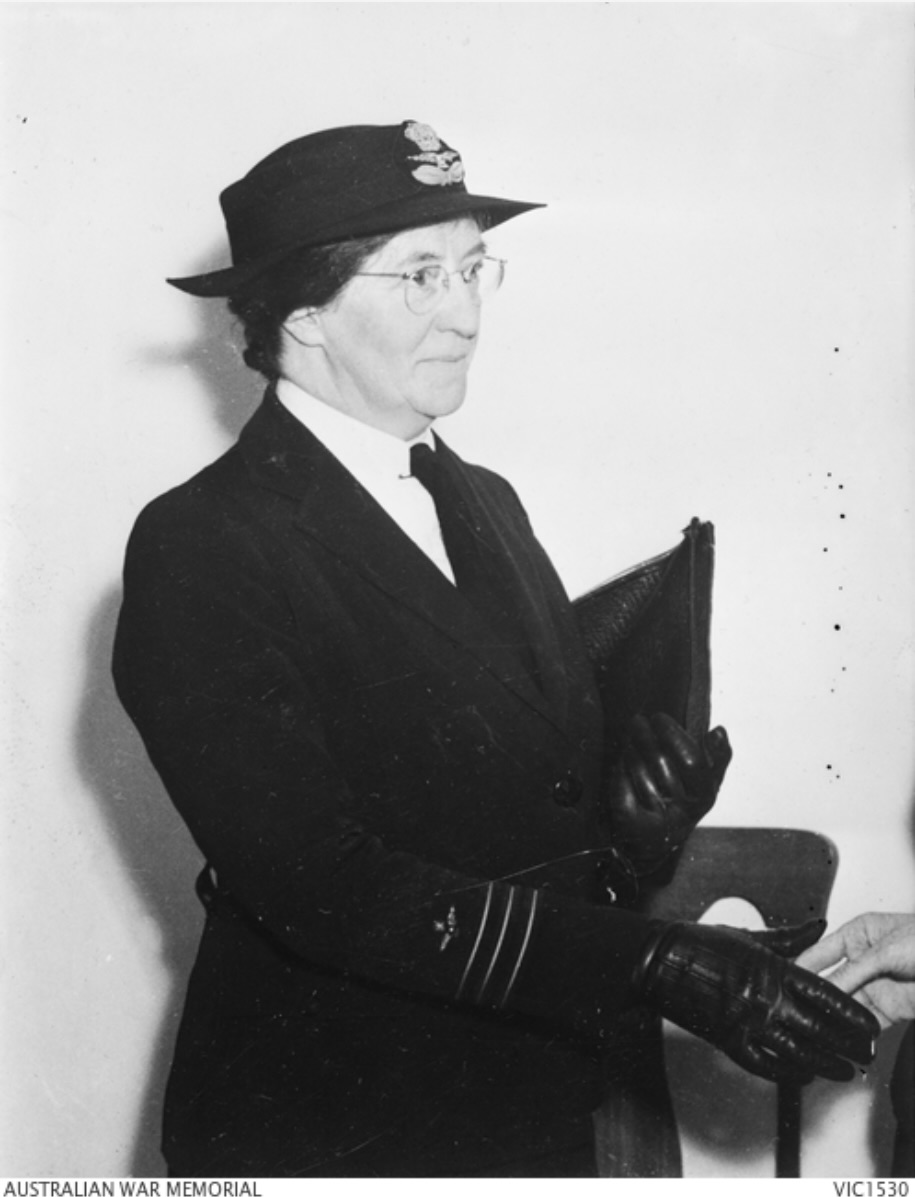
- Born: 19 July 1896; Armadale, Victoria, Australia
- Died: 29 September 1988 (aged 92); West Ryde, New South Wales, Australia
- Military career
- Allegiance: Australia
- Branch: Australian Army (1935–1940); Royal Australian Air Force (1940–1945)
- Service years: 1935–1945
- Rank: Principal Matron
- Units: Australian Army Nursing Service; Royal Australian Air Force Nursing Service
- Conflicts: Second World War
- Awards: Royal Red Cross

Muriel Knox Doherty, RRC (19 July 1896 – 29 September 1988) was an Australian nurse who served as a matron in the Royal Australian Air Force Nursing Service during the Second World War and then as a member of the United Nations Relief and Rehabilitation Administration in the Bergen-Belsen concentration camp in Germany.

== Early life and education ==
Muriel Knox Doherty was born on 19 July 1896 in Armadale, Victoria, to Elizabeth Mary (née Meudell) and Robert Knox Doherty. She was educated at home initially and later at Woodstock, a private school in North Sydney.

== Nursing career ==
In 1914, having gained a St John Ambulance First Aid Home Nursing Certificate, Doherty began work at Abbotsleigh School in Wahroonga as a school nurse. Following the outbreak of the First World War, she volunteered part-time with the Australian Red Cross Society's No. 6 Voluntary Aid Detachment (VAD) from 1915 and then full-time 1917 to 1921.

Doherty's VAD experience led her to undertake nursing training at Royal Prince Alfred Hospital (RPAH) in 1921, where she was awarded the Sir Alfred Roberts Medal for General Nursing Proficiency at her graduation in 1925. She travelled to Europe in 1930 where she gained experience as a private nurse. Back at RPAH she established and led its preliminary training school from 1933 to 1937.

Doherty volunteered for the Australian Army Nursing Service (AANS) in 1935. On the outbreak of the Second World War, she was appointed sister clerk to the Office of the Principal Matron of the AANS. Keen to serve overseas, she joined the Royal Australian Air Force Nursing Service under Margaret Irene Lang. She was 1st squadron leader and matron-in-charge of No. 3 RAAF Hospital at Richmond in 1940 and was promoted to wing commander and principal. Doherty was awarded the Royal Red Cross (1st Class) in January 1945 for her work in the RAAF Nursing Service.

In May 1945 Doherty was demobilised so that she could go to Europe and work with the United Nations Relief and Rehabilitation Administration. She worked in Germany as matron at the Bergen-Belsen concentration camp, following its liberation. The following year she served as adviser on rehabilitation and nursing in Poland.

Doherty was one of the founders of the New South Wales College of Nursing (now part of the Australian College of Nursing) in 1949. The other three were Agnes Mary Lions, Margaret Frances Guy and Georgina McCready.

Doherty wrote Caring for the Elderly in 1956 based on her research in Europe. After living in England for some years, she returned to RPAH where she began to research the hospital's history. The resultant book, The Life and Times of Royal Prince Alfred Hospital, was published posthumously. Doherty died at West Ryde on 29 September 1988.

== Posthumous recognition ==
Doherty's autobiography, Off the Record, was published posthumously by the New South Wales College of Nursing. James Murray included details of her life and work in his 1997 book, Lifework: heroes of Australian health.

An album of photographs by Doherty was included in the Treasures of the Great Libraries exhibition held at the National Library of Australia in 2002. Her papers are held in the State Library of New South Wales.

Diane Armstrong based a character in her novel, Nocturne, on Doherty.

== Works ==
- Doherty, M. K.; Sirl, M. B.; Ring, O. I. (1944), Modern practical nursing procedures, Dymocks Book Arcade
- Doherty, M. K. (1956), Caring for the elderly, Dymocks Book Arcade
- Doherty, M. K. (1996), Russell, Lynette R (ed.), The life and times of Royal Prince Alfred Hospital, Sydney, Australia, New South Wales College of Nursing, ISBN 978-0-909543-66-2
- Doherty, M. K. (1996), Russell, R. Lynette (ed.), Off the record – the life and times of Muriel Knox Doherty 1896–1988 : an autobiography, New South Wales College of Nursing, ISBN 978-0-909543-67-9
- Doherty, M. K. (2000), Cornell, J. A.; Russell, R. Lynette (eds.), Letters from Belsen 1945 : an Australian nurse's experiences with the survivors of war, Allen & Unwin, ISBN 978-1-86508-222-6
