= Royal Australian Air Force Nursing Service =

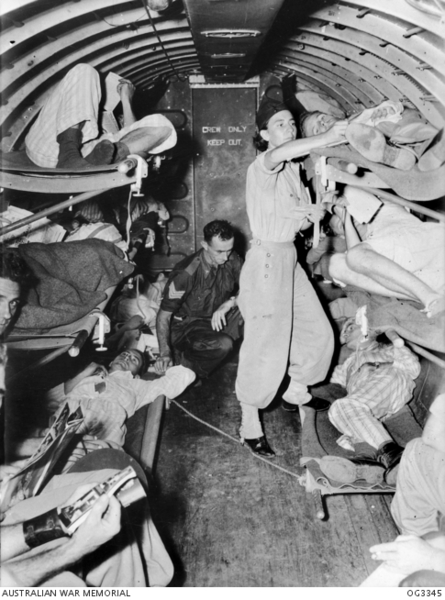
- In flight between New Guinea and Australia caring for patients in 1944
- Active: 1940–1946; 1948–1977
- Country: Australia
- Branch: Royal Australian Air Force
- Role: Nursing services
- Size: 616 (December 1945)
- Engagements: World War II; Korean War; Malayan Emergency; Vietnam War

Commanders
- Notable commanders: Margaret Lang (1940–1946)

The Royal Australian Air Force Nursing Service (RAAFNS) was a branch of the Royal Australian Air Force, which existed from 1940 to 1946, and from 1948 to 1977. Members served in World War II, the Korean War, the Malayan Emergency, and the Vietnam War.

== History ==
=== Foundation ===
The RAAFNS was founded in July 1940 at the suggestion of Air Vice-Marshal Victor Hurley, the Director-General of Medical Services. Margaret Irene Lang, who had served with the Australian Army Nursing Service during World War I and was then serving as matron of the Victoria Police Hospital, was appointed its first Matron-in-Chief. She was assisted by Muriel Knox Doherty. By December 1940 it had only 45 members, but this had increased to 616 by December 1945.

The RAAFNS was not a part of the Women's Auxiliary Australian Air Force (which was not established until March 1941), but a branch of the RAAF itself. All members held commissioned rank, and wore RAAF badges of rank along with the RAAF medical badge on their tunic lapels and capes, but did not use Air Force rank titles.

=== World War II ===
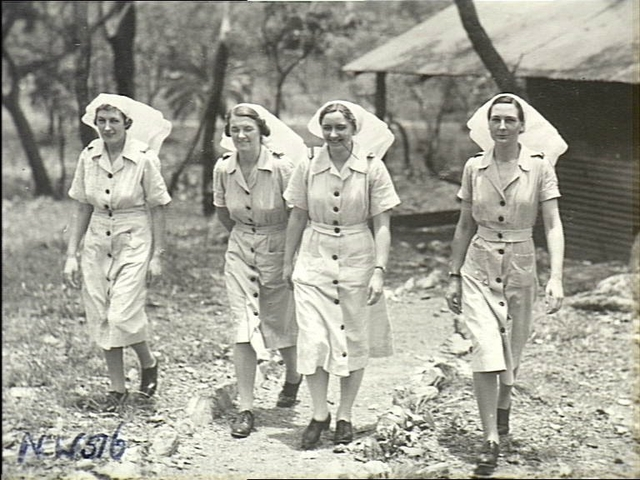
Four RAAFNS nurses at Darwin in December 1943

Most RAAFNS nurses served in clearing stations, base hospitals, station sick quarters, and rehabilitation centres in Australia, but all were obligated to serve overseas if required (unlike members of the Australian Army Nursing Service, who could choose to serve overseas or not). From November 1942, shortly after the close of the Kokoda Track campaign, RAAFNS personnel set up a medical receiving station in Port Moresby, New Guinea, and were present during the Battle of Port Moresby. Others sailed on troop convoys, accompanying contingents of airmen to Great Britain, Canada or South Africa. Between November 1942 and November 1943 No. 1 Medical Receiving Station RAAF at Coomalie Creek, south of Darwin, was bombed by the Japanese on several occasions. In 1944 No. 1 Medical Air Evacuation Transport Unit was created staffed by flight nurses of the RAAFNS. After the surrender of Japan in August 1945, RAAFNS personnel took part in the care of returning prisoners of war, until it was finally disbanded in November 1946.

=== Korean War ===
In 1948 the RAAFNS was reformed as a peace-time service. During the Korean War members of the RAAFNS served at the British Commonwealth Mobile Surgical Hospital in Seoul, and the Medical Air Evacuation Unit flew patients to Iwakuni from where they were taken by hospital train to the British Commonwealth General Hospital in Kure. Between 1950 and 1953, 12,762 Commonwealth casualties took this route. RAAFNS members also accompanied 728 patients on flights from Japan to Australia via Guam, Manila, or Port Moresby. All members of the RAAFNS in Korea were trained civilian nurses who enlisted for four years, but served only a one-year tour of duty in Korea or Japan. The last nurses returned home in 1956.

=== Vietnam ===
During the Vietnam War the RAAFNS operated medical evacuation flights from Vietnam to Australia. The first flight took place in June 1965. Casualties were flown from Vũng Tàu, Biên Hòa or Saigon to the hospital at RAAF Butterworth in Penang, and from there via the Cocos Islands, to RAAF Pearce in Western Australia, then to RAAF Richmond in New South Wales.

=== The end ===
In 1977 the Royal Australian Air Force Nursing Service ceased to exist as an independent branch when it was integrated into the Royal Australian Air Force.

== Ranks of the RAAFNS ==
All RAAFNS recruits were commissioned on entry with the rank of flying officer, though they had their own rank structure.

Rank	RAAF equivalent
Matron-in-Chief	Group Captain
Principal Matron	Wing Commander
Matron	Squadron Leader
Senior Sister	Flight Lieutenant
Sister	Flying Officer

== See also ==
- Australian Army Medical Women's Service
- Australian Service Nurses National Memorial
- Australian Women's Army Service
- Royal Australian Army Nursing Corps
- Royal Australian Naval Nursing Service
- Women in the Australian military
- Women's Auxiliary Australian Air Force
- Women's Royal Australian Air Force
- Women's Royal Australian Naval Service
