= Victor Hurley =

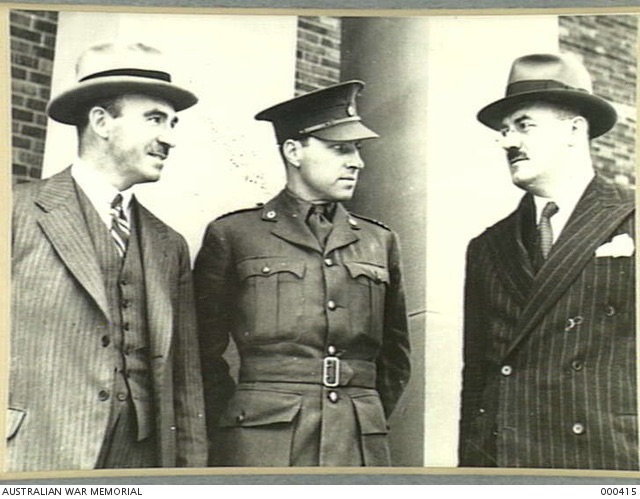
- Hurley (left) with B. A. Mellowship and J. McCahon
- Born: Thomas Ernest Victor Hurley; 3 January 1888; Ceres, Victoria
- Died: 17 July 1958 (aged 70); Royal Melbourne Hospital
- Education: University of Melbourne
- Known for: Leadership of medical institutions
- Medical career
- Profession: Surgeon
- Institutions: Royal Melbourne Hospital
- Military career
- Allegiance: Australia
- Branch: Australian Army; Royal Australian Air Force
- Service years: 1914–1920; 1940–1945
- Rank: Air Vice Marshal
- Unit: Australian Army Medical Corps
- Conflicts: First World War; Second World War
- Awards: Knight Commander of the Order of the British Empire; Companion of the Order of the Bath; Companion of the Order of St Michael and St George; Mentioned in Despatches
Australian rules football career
Personal information
- Position: Defender
Playing career^{1}
Years	Club	Games (Goals)
1911	University	7 (0)
- ^{1} Playing statistics correct to the end of 1911.

Sir Thomas Ernest Victor Hurley, KBE, CB, CMG (3 January 1888 – 17 July 1958) was a surgeon, medical administrator, military officer and an Australian rules footballer who played with University in the Victorian Football League.

== Early life and education ==
Victor Hurley was the eldest son of Thomas Hurley, state schoolteacher, and his wife Mary Elizabeth, née Scholes. Educated at various primary schools determined by his father's postings, he won a scholarship to Wesley College and then to Queen's College. He completed his Leaving Certificate at Wesley in 1903 and played for the first XI (cricket) and first XVIII (football). He entered the University of Melbourne in 1905 and earned exhibitions in pathology, medicine and obstetrics (M.B., 1909; B.S., 1910; M.D., 1912; M.S., 1913). While at University, he played VFL football for the University team. He performed well in his debut against Richmond and played every game until the end of the 1911 VFL season.

== Early medical career ==
After graduating as a doctor, Hurley was appointed resident medical officer at the Royal Melbourne Hospital and in 1911 he became a registrar. The next year he was appointed medical superintendent, and during his time in the role there was an almost total rebuilding of the hospital on its Lonsdale Street site. He was appointed an honorary surgeon to out-patients in 1914 and commenced private practice in Collins Street.

== First World War ==
On 20 August 1914, Hurley was appointed a captain in the Australian Army Medical Corps, Australian Imperial Force (AIF), and sailed for Egypt in October. He served at Gallipoli from April to September 1915 with the 2nd Field Ambulance. Promoted to lieutenant colonel in March 1916, he performed staff duties at AIF Headquarters (London) in 1916–17 and mentioned in despatches for his "tact, ability and strenuous work". In 1917–18 he served at the Western Front, primarily with the 2nd Australian General Hospital. Hurley was made a Companion of the Order of St Michael and St George in 1917 for his services to the AIF – Australian Army Medical Corps.

== Medical career resumes ==
After completing his service with the AIF, Hurley completed his Fellowship of the Royal College of Surgeons (FRCS) before returning to Melbourne in 1920. He resumed work as an outpatient surgeon at the Royal Melbourne Hospital and in private practice.

Hurley rapidly regained prominence in Melbourne medical circles, being appointed a lecturer and examiner in surgery at the University of Melbourne, founding secretary (1920–23) of the Surgical Association of Melbourne and assistant to George Syme, surgeon to the Victoria Police. After Syme's retirement in 1928, Hurley was appointed to that position and held it until 1956. In 1921 he was elected to the council of the Victorian branch of the British Medical Association (president 1930), and he served on the council for the rest of his life, apart from a short interval during the Second World War. He was a long-serving member (1923–48) of the Charities Board of Victoria and a foundation member of the Royal Australasian College of Surgeons. In 1927 he was made honorary surgeon to in-patients at the Royal Melbourne Hospital and was dean of its clinical school from 1929 to 1936.

== Second World War ==
During the Second World War, Hurley served as Director of Medical Services for the Royal Australian Air Force (RAAF), being awarded the rank of air vice marshal. The Royal Australian Air Force Nursing Service was founded in July 1940 at his suggestion based on the UK's Princess Mary's Royal Air Force Nursing Service as part of the RAAF. Margaret Irene Lang was appointed its first Matron-in-Chief. By December 1940 the service had 45 members, but this increased to over six hundred by December 1945.

He was appointed a Companion of the Order of the Bath in 1945. Hurley was subsequently knighted as a Knight Commander of the Order of the British Empire in 1950 for his public services.

== Personal life ==
In June 1919 at St James, Westminster, Victor Hurley married Elsie May Crowther, a fellow Australian serving as a member of the Voluntary Aid Detachment in London and they had two daughters and four sons together. They lived in various homes in South Yarra, Toorak and Kew and often holidayed at their family seaside cottage at Point Lonsdale.

Hurley had a natural charm, equable, quiet cheerfulness, humanity, tolerance and easy sociability that made him approachable to colleagues and patients alike. He was president of the Naval and Military Club, a member of the Melbourne Club, and was a keen golfer at the Royal Melbourne Golf Club.

Survived by his wife and children, Sir Victor Hurley died of complications of emphysema on 17 July 1958 at Royal Melbourne Hospital.
