= Australian College of Nursing =

Professional body for the nursing profession in Australia

Coordinates: 35.321215°S 149.094506°E

- Founded: 2012
- Headquarters: Parramatta, New South Wales and Deakin, Australian Capital Territory
- Location: Australia
- Key people: Adjunct Professor David Plunkett FACN, President; Dr Kathryn Zeitz FACN, CEO
- Website: www.acn.edu.au

The Australian College of Nursing (ACN), formed in 2012 from a merger of the Royal College of Nursing, Australia and the College of Nursing, is the professional body for nursing in Australia. ACN advocates, develops policy, and provides education to advance the status of nursing nationally and internationally.

== History ==
The Australian College of Nursing (ACN) was established in 2012 from the unification of its predecessor organisations, the Royal College of Nursing, Australia, and the College of Nursing (previously New South Wales College of Nursing). Both had a history dating back to about 1949.

The founders of the New South Wales College of Nursing were Muriel Knox Doherty, Agnes Mary Lions, Margaret Frances Guy (née Looker), and Georgina McCready (née Johnstone). Kathleen Stirling Scrymgour sat on the inaugural committee that founded the Royal College of Nursing in 1950 in Melbourne and was president 1953–54.

== Description ==
The Australian College of Nursing is the professional body for the nursing profession in Australia. ACN advocates, develops policy, and provides education to advance the status of nursing nationally and internationally.

ACN advocates at state and federal levels.

It has 23 faculties, including topics related to patient groups and areas of practice.

== Memberships ==
ACN is a member of the International Council of Nurses (ICN) in collaboration with the Australian Nursing and Midwifery Federation (ANMF).

== Governance ==
=== Former organisations ===
- Agnes Mary Lions – president, NSW, 1950 and 1954
- Kathleen Stirling Scrymgour – Royal College of Nursing Australia, president 1953-54

=== ACN ===
==== Presidents ====
- Carmen Morgan FACN (2013–2015)
- Adjunct Professor Kathy Baker AM FACN (DLF) (2016)
- Emeritus Professor Christine Duffield FACN (2017–2023)
- Adjunct Professor David Plunkett FACN (2023–present)

==== Chief Executive Officers ====
- Adjunct Professor Debra Thoms FACN DLF (2012–2015)
- Adjunct Professor Kylie Ward FACN (2015–2024)
- Emeritus Professor Leanne Boyd FACN (Interim CEO 2024)
- Dr Kathryn Zeitz FACN (2024–present)

== Policy Summit ==
The ACN Policy Summit is an annual forum where nurses and health policy advocates connect in Canberra. The Summit discusses problems, opportunities and strategies to address these.

== Education ==
ACN is an Institute of Higher Education and is registered and accredited by the Tertiary Education Quality and Standards Agency (TEQSA) for the delivery of the following graduates:

- Acute Care Nursing
- Aged Care Nursing
- Breast Cancer Nursing
- Cancer Nursing
- Child and Family Health Nursing
- Community and Primary Health Care Nursing
- Cosmetic Nursing
- Critical Care Nursing
- Dermatology Nursing
- Diagnostic and Interventional Radiology Nursing
- Digital Health
- Drug and Alcohol Nursing
- Leadership and Management
- Neonatal Care
- Orthopaedic Nursing
- Paediatric Nursing Studies
- Palliative Care
- Perioperative Nursing
- Stomal Therapy Nursing

ACN offers the 307 Immunisation for Health Practitioners Course which is accredited by Health Education Services Australia.

The Australian Government Department of Health and Aged Care engaged ACN to develop and deliver the COVID-19 Vaccination Training Program, a mandatory online program for all COVID-19 vaccination providers, including hospitals, general practices and vaccination clinics.

== Scholarships ==
ACN administers a range of government-funded scholarships, including:

- undergraduate and postgraduate aged care for nurses, personal care workers and allied health professionals
- nursing and midwifery courses
- the Puggy Hunter Memorial Scholarship for Aboriginal and Torres Strait Islander students studying entry-level health courses (including nursing and midwifery).

== Social impact ==
ACN provides a platform for nurses to make a difference to their profession and the wellbeing of the populations they serve through various social impact initiatives, including publication of the Nursing Leadership in Emissions Reduction Guiding Principles and Nursing Leadership in Diversity and Inclusion Guiding Principles and facilitation of the Men in Nursing Working Party.

ACN has firmly opposed violence against nurses by launching the Nurses and Violence Taskforce and #ProtectNurses campaign. ACN produced a voluntary Modern Slavery Position Statement and has been endorsed by Reconciliation Australia for having a Reflect Reconciliation Action Plan.

== Publications ==
ACN publishes the quarterly member magazine The Hive and regular episodes of The ACN Podcast. Collegian: The Australian Journal of Nursing Practice, Scholarship and Research is the official journal of ACN.

== ACN Foundation ==
The ACN Foundation's Bullwinkel Project raised funds to commission the first sculpture of an individual woman and the first to commemorate a nurse – Lieutenant Colonel Vivian Bullwinkel AO, MBE, ARRC, ED, FNM, FRCNA – in the grounds of the Australian War Memorial.
