= Looker (surname) =

Looker is a surname. Notable people with the surname include:

- Charlie Looker, (born 1980), multi-project New-York based musician
- Dane Looker (born 1976), American football player
- David Looker (1913–1995), British bobsledder
- Herbert Looker (1871–1951), English politician
- Margaret Frances Looker (1910–1988), Australian nurse
- Othniel Looker (1757–1845), American politician
- Stephen Looker (born 1977), American musician
