= Kathleen Scrymgour =

Australian hospital matron (1895–1982)

OBE Kathleen Stirling Scrymgour
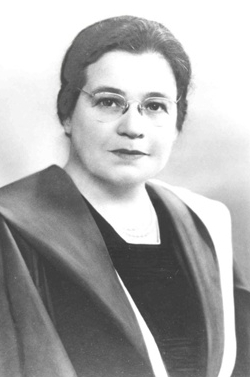
- Born: 2 May 1895; Malvern, South Australia
- Died: 4 February 1982 (aged 86); Northfield, South Australia
- Education: Bedford College
- Occupations: Hospital matron; college president
- Employer: Adelaide Hospital
- Predecessor: Jessie Maxfield

Kathleen Stirling Scrymgour OBE (2 May 1895 – 4 February 1982) was an Australian hospital matron. She was a founding member, President and fellow of what became the Royal College of Nursing in Melbourne.

== Life ==
Scrymgour was born in the Adelaide suburb of Malvern in 1895. Her parents were Amelia (born Trigg) and a printer named Bernard Vincent Scrymgour. She was their second child and they had another three. She trained as a nurse at Adelaide Hospital from 1917 for three years, where she won a gold medal.

Thanks to a Florence Nightingale scholarship she went to the UK in 1935 where she studied at Bedford College in London. She returned the following year having completed a course for "Nursing Administrators and Teachers in Schools of Nursing" with other international students. Because of this she became the hospital's first assistant tutor sister who had a qualification to do the job. In 1943 she became the assistant matron. Jessie Maxfield was the matron from 1943 to 1946 and when she returned to England, Scrymgour became her successor. After years of persuasion the hospital board approved the cost of establishing a preliminary training school for her nurses. She wanted her nurses to be educated and she encouraged them to then attain even higher qualifications. She was on the committee that created what would become the Royal College of Nursing in Melbourne in 1950. She was the President of the college from 1953 to 1954.

After she retired in May 1955 she was made an OBE.

Scrymgour died in 1988 in Northfield, a suburb of Adelaide.
