= Sydney South West Area Health Service =

Australian area health service

Agency overview
- Formed: January 2005
- Dissolved: 31 December 2010
- Minister responsible: Carmel Tebbutt, Minister for Health
- Agency executive: Mike Wallace, Chief Executive Officer
- Parent agency: New South Wales Department of Health
- Website: www.sswahs.nsw.gov.au

Sydney South West Area Health Service, abbreviated SSWAHS and known by the corporate name Sydney South West Health, was an area health service charged with the provision of public health services in central and south-western Sydney. It was formed in January 2005 from the amalgamation of the former Central Sydney Area Health Service and the South Western Sydney Area Health Service.

SSWAHS was a statutory body of the Government of New South Wales, operating under the NSW Department of Health. The head office of SSWAHS was located in Liverpool. It was disbanded on 1 January 2011 as part of the National Health Reform and creation of Local Hospital Networks, and replaced by the Sydney Local Health District and South Western Sydney Local Health District.

== Major facilities ==
=== Eastern Zone ===
The Eastern Zone of SSWAHS comprised the facilities of the former Central Sydney Area Health Service. Major facilities in the Eastern Zone were:

- Canterbury Hospital, Canterbury
- Concord Repatriation General Hospital, Concord
- Royal Prince Alfred Hospital, Camperdown
- Concord Centre for Mental Health, Concord (Sydney South West Area Mental Health Service)
- Sydney Dental Hospital, Surry Hills
- Balmain Hospital, Balmain

=== Western Zone ===
The Western Zone of SSWAHS comprised the facilities of the former South Western Sydney Area Health Service. Major facilities in the Western Zone were:

- Bankstown Lidcombe Hospital, Bankstown
- Camden Hospital, Camden
- Campbelltown Hospital, Campbelltown
- Fairfield Hospital, Prairiewood
- Liverpool Hospital, Liverpool
- Bowral Hospital, Bowral
