= Margaret Lang =

Australian nurse

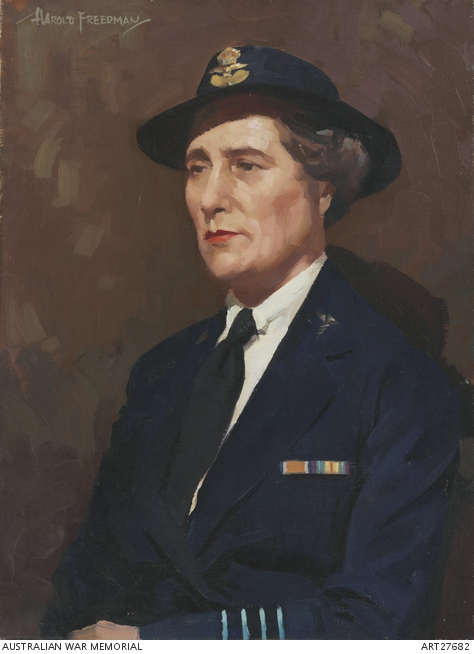
- Matron Margaret Lang 1943 by Harold Freedman
- Born: 23 May 1893; Oxley, Victoria
- Died: 14 February 1983 (aged 89); Canterbury, Victoria
- Military career
- Allegiance: Australia
- Branch: Australian Imperial Force; Royal Australian Air Force
- Service years: 1917–1920; 1940–1946
- Rank: Matron-in-Chief
- Service number: 500001
- Commands: Royal Australian Air Force Nursing Service (1940–46)
- Conflicts: First World War; Second World War
- Awards: Officer of the Order of the British Empire

Margaret Irene Lang, OBE (23 May 1893 – 14 February 1983) was an Australian military nurse who became the matron-in-chief of the Royal Australian Air Force Nursing Service.

== Early life ==
Lang was born on 23 May 1893 in Oxley, Victoria, to Annie (née Martin) and John Douglas Lang, who was a miner. She was educated at Creswick Grammar School and began her nursing training at Wangaratta Hospital in 1912.

== Nursing career ==
By the time Lang had trained as a nurse, Australia was involved in the First World War. By 1917 she had become a matron but she left the hospital in Stawell to join the Australian Army Nursing Service, Australian Imperial Force briefly in Suez before she joined 300 of her peers on Salonika. In 1919 she was in London where she had four months studying domestic science at the South-Western Polytechnic. She left the military at the beginning of 1920 with the rank of sister.

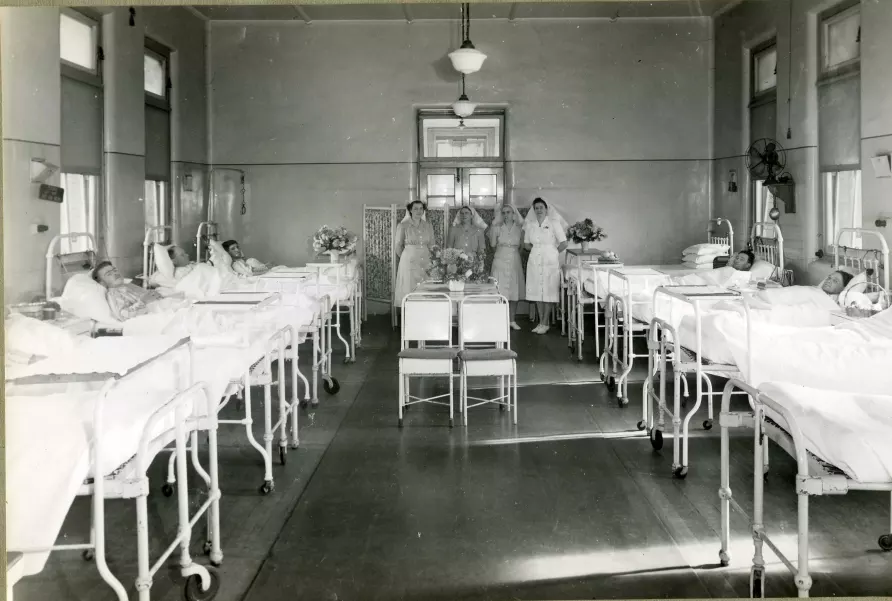
Victoria Police Hospital's ward in about 1946

Lang was a matron at hospitals in Melbourne, including the Talbot Epileptics Colony, before she returned to Stawell Hospital in 1924. She served there until 1938 when she joined the Victoria Police Hospital as matron.

The Royal Australian Air Force Nursing Service was founded in July 1940 as part of the Royal Australian Air Force (RAAF) at the suggestion of Air Vice-Marshal Victor Hurley, the Director-General of Medical Services, based on the UK's Princess Mary's Royal Air Force Nursing Service. Lang was appointed its first Matron-in-Chief, with Muriel Knox Doherty as a matron. By December 1940 the service had 45 members, but this increased to over six hundred by December 1945. All members held commissioned rank, and wore RAAF badges of rank along with the RAAF medical badge on their tunic lapels and capes, but did not use Air Force rank titles.

Following the end of the war, Lang was discharged from the RAAF and returned to Victoria Police Hospital in 1946. She was appointed an Officer of the Order of the British Empire in 1950, and died in Canterbury, Melbourne, on 14 February 1983.
