= Agnes Mary Lions =

Australian nurse (1908 – 1992)

- Born: 22 April 1908; Subiaco, Western Australia
- Died: 22 December 1992 (aged 84); Normanhurst, New South Wales, Australia
- Occupation: Industrial nurse

Agnes Mary Lions MBE known as Molly Lions (22 April 1908 – 22 December 1992) was an Australian industrial nurse and unionist. She was a founding member of the New South Wales College of Nursing.

== Life ==
Lions was born in 1908 in Subiaco, Western Australia. Her parents were Mary (born McDonald), who was a Scot, and John Maximilian Lion, who was an engineer born in Sweden. She had two elder brothers. Her brother Francis became a chemist and lecturer who was known for creating stable organic molecules that would bond with metals. In about 1910 the family moved to Sydney and she attended Petersham Girls’ Intermediate High School. In 1931 she qualified as a nurse after training at Sydney's Royal Prince Alfred Hospital.

In 1946 she started the Industrial Nurses section of the New South Wales Nursing Association. In 1947 she became a senior industrial nurse at the Eveleigh Railway Workshops in Sydney. She was a founding member of the New South Wales College of Nursing (now part of Australian College of Nursing. The others were Georgina McCready MBE, Muriel Knox Doherty RRC and Margaret Frances Looker. The four of them met a week after a meeting of nurses on 5 January 1949 in Sydney which resolved to create a College of Nursing. Between 1949 and 1952 she created the syllabus and contents for NSWCN's qualification for industrial nurses and in 1950 she gained the qualification herself.

She became a Member of the Most Excellent Order of the British Empire in 1960. In 1979 she moved to Alice Springs where she worked with her brother to assist Aboriginal Australians.

Lions died in 1992 in the Sydney suburb of Normanhurst.
