= Margaret Looker =

Australian hospital matron and nurse

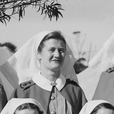
- Sister Martha Looker in 1943
- Born: Martha Fanny Looker; 14 October 1910; Hobart, Tasmania
- Died: 25 August 1988 (aged 77); Narrabundah, Australian Capital Territory
- Other name: Margaret Frances Guy
- Occupation: Nurse
- Spouse: John William Guy (m. 1955)
- Awards: Officer of the Order of the British Empire

Margaret Frances Guy, OBE (born Martha Fanny Looker; 14 October 1910 – 25 August 1988) was at the time Australia's youngest hospital matron. She was a founding member of the New South Wales College of Nursing.

== Early life ==
Born Martha Fanny Looker in Hobart, Tasmania, on 14 October 1910, she was the daughter of New Zealand-born Martha Fanny (née Smith) and English pastry cook Edward William Looker. She had four elder siblings and two more arrived after her. Her elder brother became the businessperson Sir Cecil Looker. Her father's business failed in 1917 leaving the family poor and living in the Sydney suburb of Normanhurst.

== Nursing career ==
After graduating from Sydney Girls’ High School, Looker went to the University of Sydney to take medicine but she left in 1932 to train as a nurse at the Royal Prince Alfred Hospital. She completed that in 1936 and later also studied midwifery at Crown Street Women’s Hospital in 1939. On the second day of 1940 she joined the Australian Army Nursing Service as part of the Second Australian Imperial Force. When she left in 1945, after serving in the Middle East, Papua New Guinea and in the Solomon Islands, she held the rank of captain. She changed her name by deed poll to Margaret Frances Looker in July 1944.

In 1948 Looker became a matron at Sydney's Royal Prince Alfred Hospital. Every other matron in Australia was older than her. She was a founding member of the New South Wales College of Nursing (now part of Australian College of Nursing. The others were Georgina McCready, Muriel Knox Doherty and Agnes Mary Lions. The four of them met a week after a meeting of nurses on 5 January 1949 in Sydney, which resolved to create a College of Nursing.

== Later life ==
Looker married John William Guy on 17 December 1955. In 1961 she was appointed an Officer of the Order of the British Empire is recognition of her contribution to nursing. Margaret Guy died in the Canberra suburb of Narrabundah on 25 August 1988.
