= New South Wales Nurses and Midwives' Association =

Trade union in Australia

NSWNMA
- New South Wales Nurses and Midwives' Association
- Founded: 1931
- Founder: Evelyn Grace Ione Nowland
- Headquarters: Waterloo, New South Wales
- Location: Australia
- Members: 80,000
- President: O'Bray Smith
- General Secretary: Michael Whaites
- Assistant General Secretary: Katrina Bough
- Affiliations: Unions NSW, Australian Council of Trade Unions
- Website: www.nswnma.asn.au

The New South Wales Nurses and Midwives' Association (NSWNMA) is the registered trade union which represents nurses, midwives, and carers in both employed in New South Wales, Australia, across the public, private, aged care, and primary health sectors.

== History ==
It was formed in 1931.

In 1948 the New South Wales Industrial Commission made its first compensation payment to address nurse's claims made by those who had worked in industrial and commercial businesses. The evidence was data gathered by Agnes Mary Lions who became the President of the industrial nurses section.

The NSWNMA is affiliated with UnionsNSW and ACTU, and in 1988 signed a "harmonisation" agreement with the Australian Nursing Federation (ANF) which recognises eligible members of the NSWNMA as members of the New South Wales Branch of the ANF.

At the annual conference in August 2012, delegates overwhelmingly voted in favour of changing the union's name from the former New South Wales Nurses' Association, a name it had held since its formation in 1931, to the New South Wales Nurses and Midwives' Association. The new name better reflects the union's membership base, which comprises both nurses and midwives.

The association had a membership of over 80,000 in 2026. In 2024 members of the union engaged campaigning, including strikes, to gain equivalent pay and conditions with their peers across the rest of Australia.
