= Women's Vocal Orchestra of Sumatra =

Choral group founded in a Japanese prisoner of war camp in Sumatra during World War II

The Women's Vocal Orchestra of Sumatra (1943–1944) was a choral group founded in a Japanese prisoner of war camp in Sumatra during World War II.

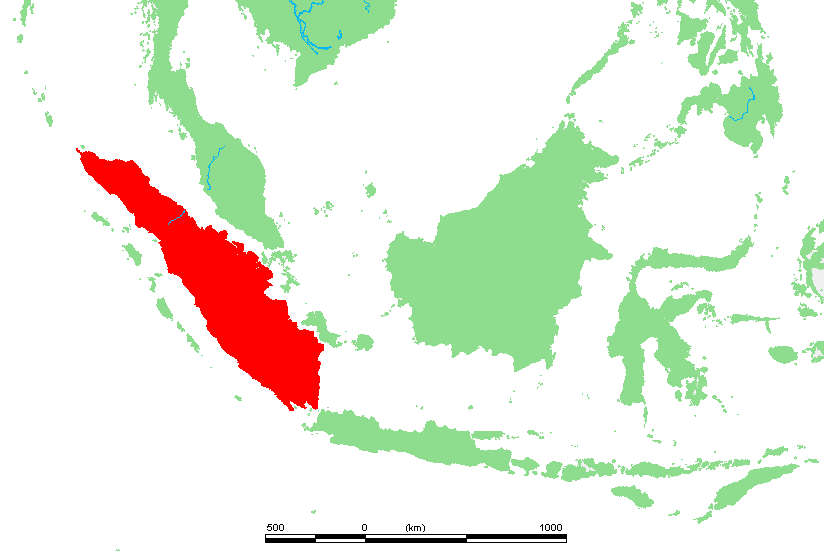
Sumatra

== Formation ==
The Women's Vocal Orchestra came into being because of the collaborative efforts of Margaret Dryburgh and Norah Chambers. Chambers served as primary conductor for the Vocal Orchestra. Prior to life in the camp, Chambers attended school at the Royal Academy of Music in London. At the school, she played in the orchestra and learned many of the skills which enabled her to arrange the pieces of music for 4-part women's chorus. She is also credited with the idea for performing and learning pieces originally scored for piano and orchestra.

While Chambers acted as arranger and conductor, Margaret Dryburgh, a missionary POW, would write down the piano and orchestral scores from memory. It is not inherently clear where Dryburgh obtained the ability to recall large works from memory. She studied piano as a small child and received a Bachelor of Arts at Newcastle College, then a part of Durham University. She also spent a great deal of time teaching music to small churches during the course of her missionary work.

After Dryburgh penned the entire work(s), Chambers and Dryburgh focused on condensing the scores into 4-part harmony. They divided the group into four separate sections (1,2,3,4 as opposed to the typical ssaa formation). Each group would meet sometime during the day to practice separately and then at night Chambers and Dryburgh would lead the entire group in the Dutch kitchen. However, a singer or two would be missing from rehearsal because of illness.

== Music ==
=== Compositional style ===
Dryburgh and Chambers did not attempt to imitate instruments but instead used humming for sounds and consonants to obtain a sense of rhythm. In other words, the voices had to “feel like certain instruments” or they might be asked to “acquire instrumental agility, articulating phrases that are idiomatic to strings or winds.” However, Chambers and Dryburgh did not write down many of the syllables used while they were in Sumatra prison camp. The syllables are now known thanks in large part to later interviews with Norah Chambers. The syllables varied to express mood and to change the quality of the voices.

For instance, in the introduction of Dvorak's “Largo”, the syllable “nuh” was used to create an ethereal breathless quality. This shifted to “leh” at the entrance of the main theme in order to add focus to the voices. It again changes to “neh” in order to add intensity during the middle section. In addition to the impact of the 30 vocal scores, the Women's Vocal Orchestra of Sumatra has come to be affiliated with Dryburgh's "The Captives' Hymn". The piece came to be performed at Sunday church services at the prison camp. K. Marie Stolba, Professor of Music, Emerita, at Indiana University-Purdue University, after studying the piece phrase by phrase believes it to be fragments of hymn melodies Dryburgh knew. The words came to be a unifying force of the women imprisoned by the Japanese.

=== List of works (alphabetical by composer surname) ===
- Bach—“Jesu, Joy of Man’s Desiring”
- Barrett—"Coronach" from A Highland Lament
- Beethoven—Minuet in G
- Beethoven—Movement 1 from Moonlight Sonata
- Boughton—“Faery Song” from The Immortal Hour
- Brahms—Waltz no. 15
- Cécile Chaminade—Aubade
- Chopin—Prelude no. 6
- Chopin—Prelude no. 15 “Raindrop”
- Chopin—Prelude no. 20 “Funeral March”
- Debussy—“Reverie”
- Antonin Dvorak—Humoresque no. 7
- Dvorak—"Largo" from New World Symphony
- Benjamin Godard—"Berceuse" from Jocelyn
- Grainger—"Country Gardens" (Morris dance tune)
- Grieg—“Morning” from Peer Gynt Suite no. 1
- Edward MacDowell—“Sea Song”
- MacDowell—“To a Wild Rose”
- Mendelssohn—“Shepherd’s Complaint” from Songs Without Words*Mendelssohn—Venetian Gondola Song no. 3
- Mozart—Allegro from Sonata in C
- Paderewski—“Menuet a l’antique”
- Ravel—Bolero
- Schubert—First Movement from Unfinished Symphony
- Tchaikovsky—Andante Cantabile from String Quartet
- (Irish)—“ Londonderry Air”
- (German)—“Shepherd’s Dance” from Henry Vlll
- (Scottish)—“Auld Lang Syne”

=== Concerts ===
The exact number of concerts remain unclear; but it is estimated as three or four. However, the number of vocal compositions consist of 30. The most famous of the concerts is the December 27, 1943 concert which has been dubbed the “Christmas Concert”. At the concert Chambers served as conductor, Dryburgh sang, and Ena Murray, Chambers younger sister, is listed as producer and performer. The repertoire selected for the program is not agreed upon. However, “Largo” from Dvorkak's New World is a known selection.

The act of performing did pose a risk because at times the Japanese banned concerts. However, it is not known how much of a risk this particular concert posed to its performers. The concert was given with an intermission and refreshments. Many of the women pulled together rations to provide this sense of normalcy in attending a concert around Christmas time.

The concert was attended by many of the prisoners and at least one guard. The guard pressed through the crowd of women in order to see the Vocal Orchestra. Upon reaching the front of the audience he remained still for the rest of the concert.

== Its Ending ==
The Women's Vocal Orchestra continued as long as there existed enough women to sing. Norah Chambers later lamented “Our vocal orchestra was silenced forever when more than half had died and the others were too weak to continue…it was wonderful while it lasted.” The exact date when the group ceased to be is not known. Dryburgh died in April 1945 after a move to a new camp. Chambers died in June 1989.

=== Impact ===
The Women's Vocal Orchestra of Sumatra has been depicted many times, from memoirs such as White Coolies (Betty Jeffrey, 1954) to novels such as Sisters Under the Rising Sun (Heather Morris, 2023). The documentary Song of Survival (1985) and the feature film Paradise Road (1997) were well-received, but they do contain some historical inaccuracies. Some historians argue that some errors emerge from the desire to avoid the issues of race. Additionally, presenting the effects gender played in the prison camps seemed difficult in a politically correct mindset. However, other historians argue that in the films focusing on the Women's Vocal Orchestra problems arise because of theme. Historian Hank Nelson asserts that filming the death by machine gun fire which immediately followed some of the women's capture (the Bangka Island massacre), would be impossible to set the tone the filmmakers desired.

The music has been performed by numerous choirs across the world. In October 2013 a 70th anniversary concert was performed by a British choir. The concert also featured accounts of the lives of Norah Chambers and Margaret Dryburgh. Another similar concert featuring of the Women's Vocal Orchestra of Sumatra featured Peninsula's Women's Chorus conducted by Patricia Hennings in 1985. The Sydney Women's Vocal Orchestra recorded "The Captives' Hymn", which was included in the audiobook of Sisters Under the Sun.

The final chapter of The Sound of Hope: Music as Solace, Resistance and Salvation During the Holocaust and World War II (2020) is devoted to this orchestra.
