= Norah Chambers =

British chorale conductor (1905–1989)

- Born: Margaret Constance Norah Hope; 26 April 1905; Colony of Singapore (now Republic of Singapore)
- Died: 1989 (aged 83–84); Jersey
- Known for: Prisoner of war during World War II
- Spouse: John Chambers (m. 1930)
- Children: 1

Norah Chambers (née Margaret Constance Norah Hope; 1905–1989) was a British chorale conductor, notable as the co-founder of the Women's Vocal Orchestra of Sumatra while interned by the Japanese Army..

== Early life and education ==
Chambers was born Margaret Constance Norah Hope to engineer James Laidlaw Hope and Margaret Annie Ogilvie Mitchell in 1905, in Singapore. She was sent to boarding school in Aylesbury, England and went on to attend the Royal Academy of Music, London. Chambers studied piano, the violin, and chamber music.

== Career ==
Chambers performed with the Royal Academy of Music orchestra under Sir Henry Wood.

In 1943, while a prisoner of war, Chambers founded the Women's Vocal Orchestra of Sumatra with Margaret Dryburgh, writing out the music from memory. The story of this choir, and her part in it, is told in many of the depictions of life in the Japanese internment camps, from memoirs such as White Coolies (Betty Jeffrey, 1954) to novels such as Sisters Under the Rising Sun (Heather Morris, 2023). It forms the final chapter of the 2020 scholarly work The Sound of Hope: Music as Solace, Resistance and Salvation During the Holocaust and World War II.

After retirement in Jersey, Chambers composed music for, and directed the St. Mark's Church choir in St. Helier.

== Personal life ==
Chambers married engineer John Lawrence Chambers in 1930 in Malaya and they had a daughter Sally in 1933. She taught violin locally.

During World War II, Chambers traveled for five days through the jungle from Malaya to Singapore and succeeded in getting her daughter evacuated to Perth in Australia. She was also evacuated but her ship, SS Vyner Brooke, was bombed and destroyed. She was interned in a Japanese prisoner of war camp, her husband sent to another. After the war, Chambers was reunited with her family and returned to Malaya.

She retired in 1952 to Jersey.

== Legacy ==
After the war, her music produced in the camps was performed widely. Her work and time in the camp was the inspiration for the film Paradise Road.
