= Margaret Dryburgh =

English educator (1890–1945)

- Born: 21 February 1890; Sunderland, United Kingdom
- Died: 21 April 1945 (aged 54); Bangka Island, Dutch East Indies.
- Education: BA Degree in Education, qualified nurse
- Medical career
- Profession: Teacher, nurse and missionary

Chinese name
- Traditional Chinese: 泰美珠
- Simplified Chinese: 泰美珠
Transcriptions
Standard Mandarin
- Hanyu Pinyin: Tài Měizhū

Margaret Dryburgh (24 February 1890 – 21 April 1945) was an English-born teacher who spent most of her life as a missionary teaching in Singapore. During her wartime internment by the Japanese Army, she wrote "The Captives' Hymn", and worked with classically trained musician Norah Chambers to co-found the Women's Vocal Orchestra of Sumatra.

== Early life ==
Margaret Dryburgh was born in Nelson Street, Monkwearmouth, Sunderland, an industrial city in the north of England in 1890. She was the eldest child of Reverend William Dryburgh, minister of St Stephen's Presbyterian Church, and his wife, Elizabeth Webster. The family moved to Swalwell, near Gateshead, when Dryburgh was a baby, where her father worked as minister at Swalwell Presbyterian Church from 1895. When he retired in 1906, the family returned to Sunderland, where their local church was St George's in Stockton Road.

Dryburgh trained as a teacher at King's College, Newcastle, later achieving a BA degree from Durham University with distinction in Latin and Education. She joined the staff of Ryhope Grammar School in 1911, where she taught history, French and Latin for the next six years. She left teaching, however, to become a Presbyterian missionary in 1917, qualifying as a nursing sister to extend her skills. It is believed it was the influence of her mother, a leading light in the Women's Missionary Association, which persuaded her to volunteer for this role.

== Life as a missionary ==
Dryburgh's first posting as a missionary came in 1919, when she was sent to Shantou in China. Quite by chance, the mission was supported by her family church of St George's, and she was affectionately "adopted" by the Sunderland congregation as "our missionary." It was a critical time in China's history, with a growth in anti-foreign feeling, but Dryburgh managed to learn the Shantou dialect in two years and then started work as a teacher at the Sok Tek Girls' School.

Dryburgh moved on to Singapore some years later, where she was appointed principal of the Choon Guan School in 1934. Such was her dedication to the role that, within a very short time, she raised standards so much that it was officially recognised as a secondary school and received Government aid. Dryburgh spent her time outside the classroom helping in the local community. A skilled musician, she organised the training of choirs and was a stalwart of the Women's Fellowship. Fund-raising concerts and charity events in aid of the school were also arranged by Dryburgh, as well as picnics for local children. Former pupils later recalled how she "frequently paid for milk for undernourished pupils" and encouraged the girls to become teachers.

== Second World War ==
The outbreak of the Second World War put an end to her missionary work. When Singapore fell in 1942, Dryburgh tried to escape from the advancing Japanese forces by ship, but was captured with other missionaries. The women were taken to a Japanese internment camp at Sumatra, where death from disease and malnutrition was common. Despite the squalid conditions, Dryburgh retained her indomitable "British Bulldog" spirit throughout, as well as her strong Christian faith.

Within days of arriving at the camp, Dryburgh started arranging church services for her fellow inmates, as well as a Glee Club, hymn singing, writing classes and poetry sessions. She also ran a short story club for the prisoners and produced a monthly camp magazine which included articles on cookery, a children's section and a crossword puzzle.

Her primary interest, though, was her musical work. After joining forces with fellow musician, Norah Chambers, a graduate of the Royal Academy of Music in London, the pair formed a camp choir, the Women's Vocal Orchestra of Sumatra. Dryburgh wrote down pages of music from memory, from baroque to contemporary, for the vocal orchestra to perform, as well as pieces of her own light classical compositions. The music was arranged in four parts, which were hummed by the women to give the effect of an orchestra, and included pieces by Handel, Chopin, Brahms and Beethoven. Even the Japanese soldiers were said to be amazed at what they heard, inviting themselves to the concerts. The Captives' Hymn was one of the pieces written by Dryburgh, and was sung each Sunday during church services.

The concerts continued throughout 1944 and into 1945. The chorus ceased to function, however, once over half of its members had died.

Constant hunger and disease eventually took their toll on Dryburgh, who died on 21 April 1945, a few days after the women were transferred to a camp at Loebok Linggau. She had become ill on the three-day journey from Bangka Island camp, and eventually succumbed to dysentery. The remaining inmates buried Dryburgh among some rubber trees at Belau camp on Sumatra two days later. She was reburied in the Dutch War Grave Cemetery in Java in 1951.

== Legacy ==
The story of this choir, and her part in it, is told in many of the depictions of life in the Japanese internment camps, from memoirs such as White Coolies (Betty Jeffrey, 1954) to novels such as Sisters Under the Rising Sun (Heather Morris, 2023). It forms the final chapter of the 2020 scholarly work The Sound of Hope: Music as Solace, Resistance and Salvation During the Holocaust and World War II.

The Captives' Hymn and her other compositions are still performed by women's choirs. A documentary about camp life, Song of Survival, was shown on Channel 4. The film Paradise Road, made in 1996, told the story of life at the camp, with the role of Dryburgh played by Pauline Collins. The Captives' Hymn was used in the film during a burial scene. Dryburgh's name was changed to Margaret Drummond in the film.

== Bibliography ==
- Colijn, Helen (1995). Song of Survival: Women Interned. Ashland, Oregon, United States: White Cloud Press. ISBN 1-883991-10-2.
- Grant, M.E.; Cullen, S.G.; Dryburgh, M.; Livingston, A.A.; Mackintosh, S.E. A Memorial of Margaret Dryburgh, Ann Armstrong Livingston, Sabine Elizabeth Mackintosh ... With an account of their internment by their fellow-prisoner, S. Gladys Cullen. Unknown binding. B000XGK7RM.
- Jeffrey, Betty (1954). White Coolies. London: Angus and Robertson.
