= The Tattooist of Auschwitz =

Novel by Heather Morris

- Author: Heather Morris
- Language: English
- Genre: Historical
- Publisher: Bonnier Books UK Limited
- Publication date: 11 January 2018
- Publication place: New Zealand

The Tattooist of Auschwitz is a 2018 Holocaust novel by New Zealand novelist Heather Morris. The book tells the story of how Slovak Jew Lale Sokolov, who was imprisoned at Auschwitz in 1942, fell in love with a girl he was tattooing at the concentration camp. The story is based on the real lives of Sokolov and his wife, Gita Furman. There has been mixed criticism of the book, with some complimenting the novel's compelling story based on real-life events, while claims of factual inaccuracies that may lead to miseducation around historical events have been made by the Auschwitz Memorial Research Center.

As of October 2019, the novel had sold more than three million copies around the world; 61,391 copies of The Tattooist of Auschwitz were sold in 2018 in Ireland. In 2018, it was the #1 New York Times Bestseller and #1 International Bestseller.

== Background ==
The book, which was Morris’ debut novel, was originally written as a screenplay. Morris was given the idea of telling the story of Lale Sokolov by a mutual friend of hers and Lale's son after Lale's wife Gita died. Morris met with Lale for three years until his death in 2006 to hear his story about his time with Gita in Auschwitz and take notes for her screenplay. During those meetings with Lale, he told Morris about the trauma, pain and survivor guilt he experienced.

Six years after the first meeting with Lale, Morris’ sister-in-law suggested writing the story as a book.

== Plot ==
Told from the perspective of Lale Sokolov, the story follows his journey as a prisoner of Auschwitz concentration camp during World War II. After being forcibly transported on a long journey in a livestock train with other Jewish prisoners, Lale arrives at Auschwitz II-Birkenau work camp where, within his first night, he witnesses two men killed by the SS.

Lale begins to suffer the horrors of a concentration-camp, which involves witnessing gassings of fellow prisoners and becoming ill with typhus. While Lale is ill, the current tattooist of the camp, Pepan, takes interest in him and arranges for him to become his apprentice. Lale endures the labour of tattooing new prisoners to enable his further survival.

Lale briefly meets a beautiful, young woman while tattooing her arm upon her entry to the camp, and he experiences love at first sight. Lale becomes the main tattooist after Pepan disappears. Lale asks the SS officer in charge of him, Baretski, for an assistant, just as Pepan had asked that he be his assistant. Baretski picks out a young prisoner named Leon.

Lale uses his relationship with Baretski to gain increased privileges within the camp, including the ability to communicate with the beautiful woman he met earlier, Gita. Gita works in one of the camp warehouses that houses the confiscated belongings of prisoners and often sneaks valuable items to Lale. Lale then risks his own life to exchange jewels and money with a sympathetic German worker who comes to the camp each day for medicine and items of clothing to help prisoners who are suffering or gain favours with the SS. For example, while Gita is ill with typhus, Lale brings her medicine and promises to one day start a family with her once she is well again.

The SS officers begin acting nervous and impulsive upon news that the Russian army is advancing. Camp documents are destroyed. Many prisoners are transferred out of Auschwitz, including Gita who in the rush tells Lale her surname is Furman. Lale is transferred to Mauthausen in Austria and then soon to another camp near Vienna. Lale escapes from the camp through a hole in the fence and, upon being found by Russian soldiers, is forced to work at a chalet that serves as headquarters for Russian soldiers due to his ability to speak both German and Russian. Every day he is escorted to town by a Russian soldier to procure young, attractive German women to come to parties at the chalet in the evening. He pays them with money and jewels. One day he is told that his escort is no longer necessary and he can take the car into town alone. Once there, he escapes and makes his way to his hometown to find his sister alive, but learns that his parents are still missing and that his older brother has died.

Meanwhile, Gita has escaped her transport with three Polish women before making her way to Bratislava, Slovakia.

Lale then heads to Bratislava to find Gita, knowing that many Slovak prisoners are being sent there. He waits two weeks at a train station and then spots her in a street. The pair kneel down and tell each other they love each other. Lale asks if Gita will marry him and she agrees.

== Reception ==
Timonthy Niedermann, writing in The New York Journal of Books, calls the novel “at once sobering and poignant, both weighted with unspeakable horrors and uplifted by the unique hope of love”. He felt that while the book lacks physical descriptions, and Morris is “vague about the specifics of the extermination process”, her depiction of humanity in the characters is a strength.

Wanda Witek-Malicka from the Auschwitz Memorial Research Center, writing in Memoria, offered historical criticism, questioning the novel's factual inaccuracies and stating that the entire image of reality at Auschwitz displayed in the book is built on “exaggerations, misinterpretations and understatements”. She warns that those who read the Czech translation of the book may take its stories as fact, which the Memorial Center believes is "dangerous and disrespectful to history".

A key concern for the Auschwitz Memorial Research Center was Morris' claim that Gita's identification number tattooed on her arm was 34902, stating "we do not find any surviving documents with her personal data or relating to number 34902 issued in the women's series" and that a prisoner arriving at Auschwitz at the time Gita arrived could not have received such a high number. Witek-Malicka states that, according to Gita's own testimony, her identification number was 4562. Another major concern was that the sexual relationship between Cilka and Johann Schwarzhuber would have been impossible in reality. Witek-Malicka also rejects Morris' claims that Doctor Mengele conducted sterilisation tests on men in Auschwitz and that in 1942 Lale gave Gita penicillin for her typhoid fever; this antibiotic was not widely available until after the war. Witek-Malicka also stated that there was no historical precedent for a scene where female prisoners smuggle gunpowder under their fingernails.

Hirsh, Láníček, Mitschke & Shields, writing in the Australian Journal of Jewish Studies, state that creative license is common, but that “Heather Morris’ steadfast reliance on conversations she shared with Lale Sokolov towards the end of his life have contributed to a simplification that narrows understanding of the reality of Auschwitz”. They note the flattening of the experiences of the character, Gita Furman, as an example of this simplification.

== Television adaptation ==
The creative director of Synchronicity Films, Claire Mundell, secured the rights to The Tattooist of Auschwitz after making a deal with Bonnier Books UK in 2018. The novel was set to be turned into a multi-part television series to be tentatively released in January 2020. However, it was not until 2023 that production began, with Jonah Hauer-King and Anna Próchniak joining the series. The Tattooist of Auschwitz was broadcast on 2 May 2024 on Stan in Australia, Sky Atlantic in the United Kingdom and Peacock in the United States.

== Controversy ==
Heather Morris's book was criticized for its plot consistency with historical truth. Among other things, the following were questioned: Gita Furman's high camp number, the example of Josef Mengele's experiments described in the work, the delivery of Penicillin to the camp, the title character being brought to the Gas chamber by Stefan Baretzki in order to identify the body of a gassed prisoner, the alleged long-term sexual relationship of Johann Schwarzhuber with Cilka and other details from the realities of the operation camp in Auschwitz and the discrepancies between Lale Sokolov's story and the story of Ludwig Eisenberg contained in camp documents Wanda Witek-Malicka from the Auschwitz Museum Research Center stated that the book, contrary to appearances, is loosely based on the biography of an authentic person, is an impression of camp life without documentary value, and due to the number of substantive errors, cannot be recommended as a valuable book for people who want to know and understand the history of Auschwitz.

== Translations ==
By November 2018, the book had been translated into 17 languages. By September 2019, official translations of the book had been published in 47 languages. One of these translations is in Slovak, Lale's native language. Morris celebrated the launch of the Slovak version of the book in Krompachy in Eastern Slovakia, which is where Lale was born.
