= Heather Morris (author) =

Australian author (born 1953)

- Born: 1953 (age 72–73); Te Awamutu, New Zealand
- Education: Monash University (BA)
- Writing career
- Notable work: The Tattooist of Auschwitz
- Website: heathermorrisauthor.com

Heather Morris (born 1953) is a New Zealand author who lives in Australia. Her 2018 debut novel was The Tattooist of Auschwitz.

== Early life and family ==
Heather Morris was born in 1953 in Te Awamutu in the North Island of New Zealand. She later moved with her family to the town of Pirongia, and graduated from Te Awamutu High School. In interviews, she stated that as a child she knew nothing about the Holocaust.

In 1971, she moved to Melbourne; there she met and married Steve Morris in 1973. In 1975, she returned to New Zealand with her husband and settled in Christchurch. Their first son was born in 1976, their second son in 1980, and their daughter in 1985.

She began studying at the University of Canterbury in 1986 but returned to Melbourne in 1987 and graduated from Monash University with a BA in Political Science and Sociology in 1991. In 1995, she began working as an office manager in the social work department at the Monash Medical Center in Melbourne, where she remained until 2017.

== Career ==
In 1996, Morris enrolled in a professional writing course at the Australian College of Journalism. She has participated in screenwriting lectures, seminars and creative workshops both in Australia and the US. Her first script was reviewed by the Oscar-winning author and screenwriter Pamela Wallace.

In 2003, she met and befriended Lale Sokolov, two months after the death of his wife, Gita. He was 87 years old at the time. For the next three years, until his death in 2006, Lale told her details about his life during the Holocaust and his work as a tattooist in the Auschwitz concentration camp, a job he had been assigned to by the camp's S.S. administrators. Based on his stories, Morris later wrote The Tattooist of Auschwitz, initially as a screenplay. Although the screenplay was optioned by an Australian film company, the company did not exercise its right and the option lapsed after six years. She then entered her work in international competitions where she won many honours including the International Independent Film Awards in 2016.

Eventually, Morris was persuaded by her sister-In-law to rewrite the screenplay as a novel, which she titled The Tattooist of Auschwitz. The book, released in 2018, became a bestseller. It was published in over 50 countries around the world and sold tens of millions of copies. In 2018, it was #1 on the New York Times Best Seller list and #1 on The New York Times international bestseller list. In 2024, the book was adapted into the miniseries The Tattooist of Auschwitz, with Harvey Keitel as Lale Sokolov and Melanie Lynskey as Morris.

Her second book, the sequel to The Tattooist from Auschwitz, Cilka's Journey, was released in 2020 and tells the story of Cilka Kovacova, who was 16 when she arrived in Auschwitz and became the camp commandant's mistress. After her release from the camp she was arrested and sent to the Gulag in Russia where she met her husband Ivan and fled to Canada. As part of the research work for the book, Morris visited Slovakia four times and researched the life of Kovacova. She also visited Yad Vashem to further research the Holocaust. Kovacova's stepson, George Kovach from California, sued Morris upon the publication of the book, because according to him the story is "hurtful" and blurring the boundaries of fact and fiction.

The third book in the trilogy Three Sisters, about three sisters who together survive Auschwitz, arrive in Slovakia and immigrate to Israel, was released in 2021.

Her 2023 novel, Sisters Under the Rising Sun, is about women in the Japanese labor camps in Dutch East Indies (now Indonesia) during World War II. Some of the main characters are Margaret Dryburgh, an English teacher and missionary, and Norah Chambers, who had trained at the Royal Academy of Music; the novel shows how the a capella choir that the pair created, the Women's Vocal Orchestra of Sumatra, kept up camp morale. The arrangements and compositions, especially "The Captives' Hymn", are still performed. The audiobook version of Sisters Under the Rising Sun includes recordings by the Sydney Women's Vocal Orchestra.

== Published works ==
=== The Tattooist of Auschwitz trilogy ===
- 2018 - The Tattooist of Auschwitz, Bonnier Books UK (UK and Australia) and HarperCollins Publishers (USA). New edition in 2024
- 2019 - Cilka's Journey, St. Martin's Publishing Group
- 2021 - Three Sisters, Center Point Large Print

=== Other novels ===
- 2020 - Stories of Hope, Bonnier Books UK
- 2022 - Listening Well, St. Martin's Publishing Group
- 2023 - Sisters Under the Rising Sun, St. Martin's Publishing Group
- 2025 - The Wish Zaffre, Bonnier Books UK
- 2026 - The Piano Teacher of Montparnasse, Firefinch Publishing
