= Wilma Oram =

Australian nurse (1916–2001)

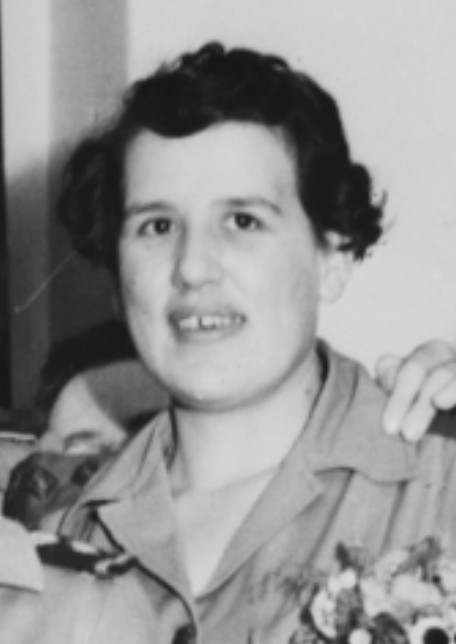
- Oram, after her return to Australia from a Japanese prisoner-of-war camp, September 1945
- Born: Wilma Elizabeth Forster Oram; 17 August 1916; Glenorchy, Victoria
- Died: 28 May 2001 (aged 84); Richmond, Victoria
- Burial place: Pakenham Cemetery
- Military career
- Allegiance: Australia
- Branch: Second Australian Imperial Force
- Service years: 1941–1946
- Rank: Captain
- Service number: VFX58783
- Unit: Royal Australian Army Nursing Corps
- Conflicts: Second World War
- Awards: Member of the Order of Australia

Wilma Elizabeth Forster Young, AM (née Oram; 17 August 1916 – 28 May 2001) was an Australian Army nurse during the Second World War.

== Second World War ==
Oram was evacuated from Singapore in February 1942 and was aboard the SS Vyner Brooke when the ship was sunk in Bangka Strait by Japanese aircraft. After surviving in the water for many hours she came ashore at Bangka Island and became a prisoner of war until 1945. Vivian Bullwinkel, the only nurse to survive the Bangka Island massacre, and Betty Jeffrey, whose secret diary became the best-seller White Coolies, were captives together with Oram.

Oram was a founder of the Australian Nurses Memorial Centre, together with Edith Hughes-Jones and Annie Sage, Vivian and Betty. Jeffrey and Bullwinkel became the public relations front of the Nurses Memorial Centre, visiting every sizable hospital in Victoria to raise money that created the centre.

== Post-war life ==
Following the war, Oram married Alan Livingstone Young, who had also been a prisoner of war. They settled on a dairy farm at Cardinia, Victoria, and had four children. She was an active member of the Returned and Services League of Australia, serving as the treasurer and later president of its Pakenham branch. She worked for causes including greater recognition for Vietnam War veterans and to raise money for the Australian Service Nurses National Memorial, unveiled in Canberra on 2 October 1999.

Young was appointed a Member of the Order of Australia in the 1998 Queen's Birthday Honours. She was inducted onto the Victorian Honour Roll of Women in 2001.
