= Australian Service Nurses National Memorial =

Coordinates: 35.286°S 149.145°E

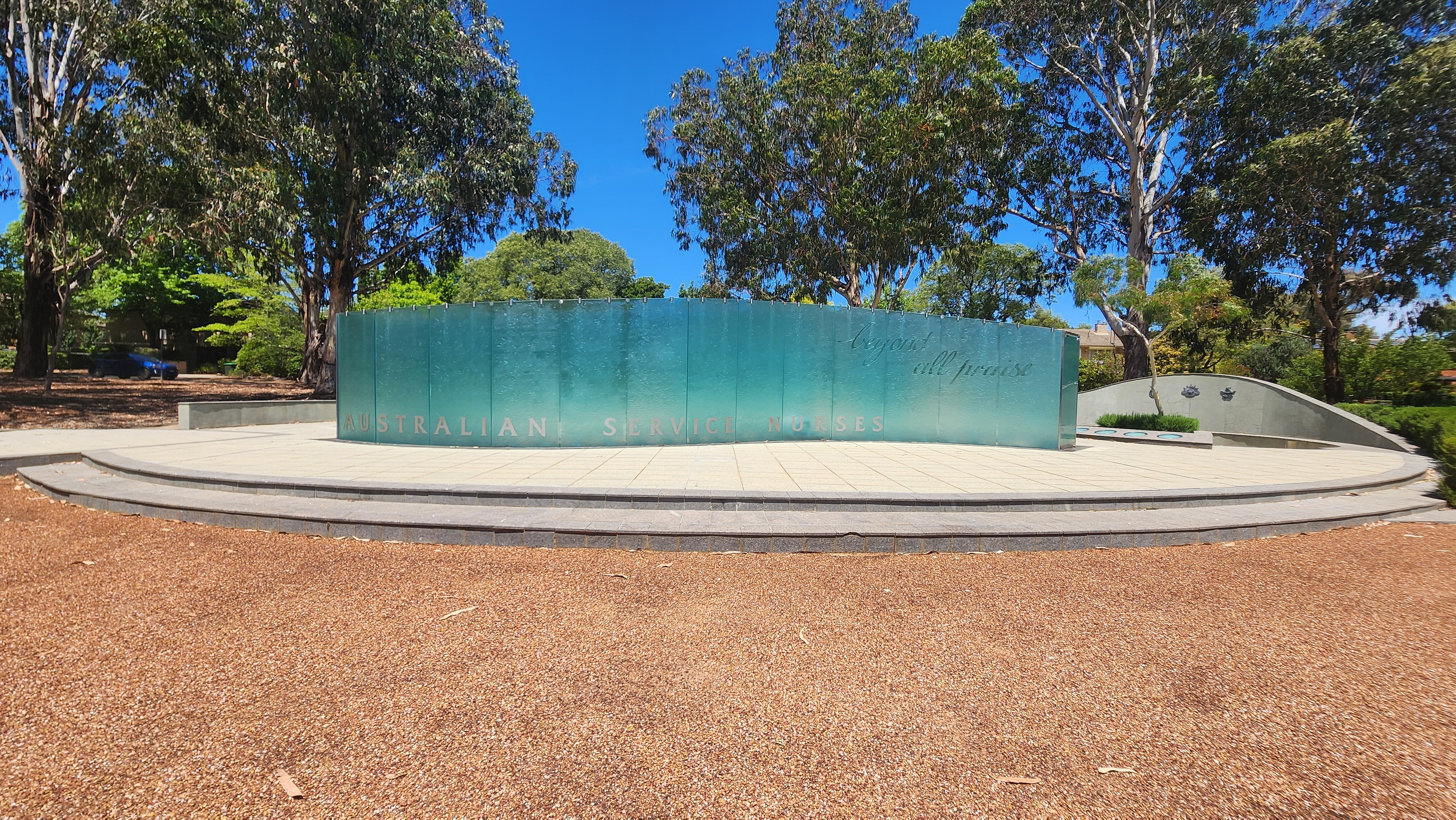
The Australian National Services Memorial

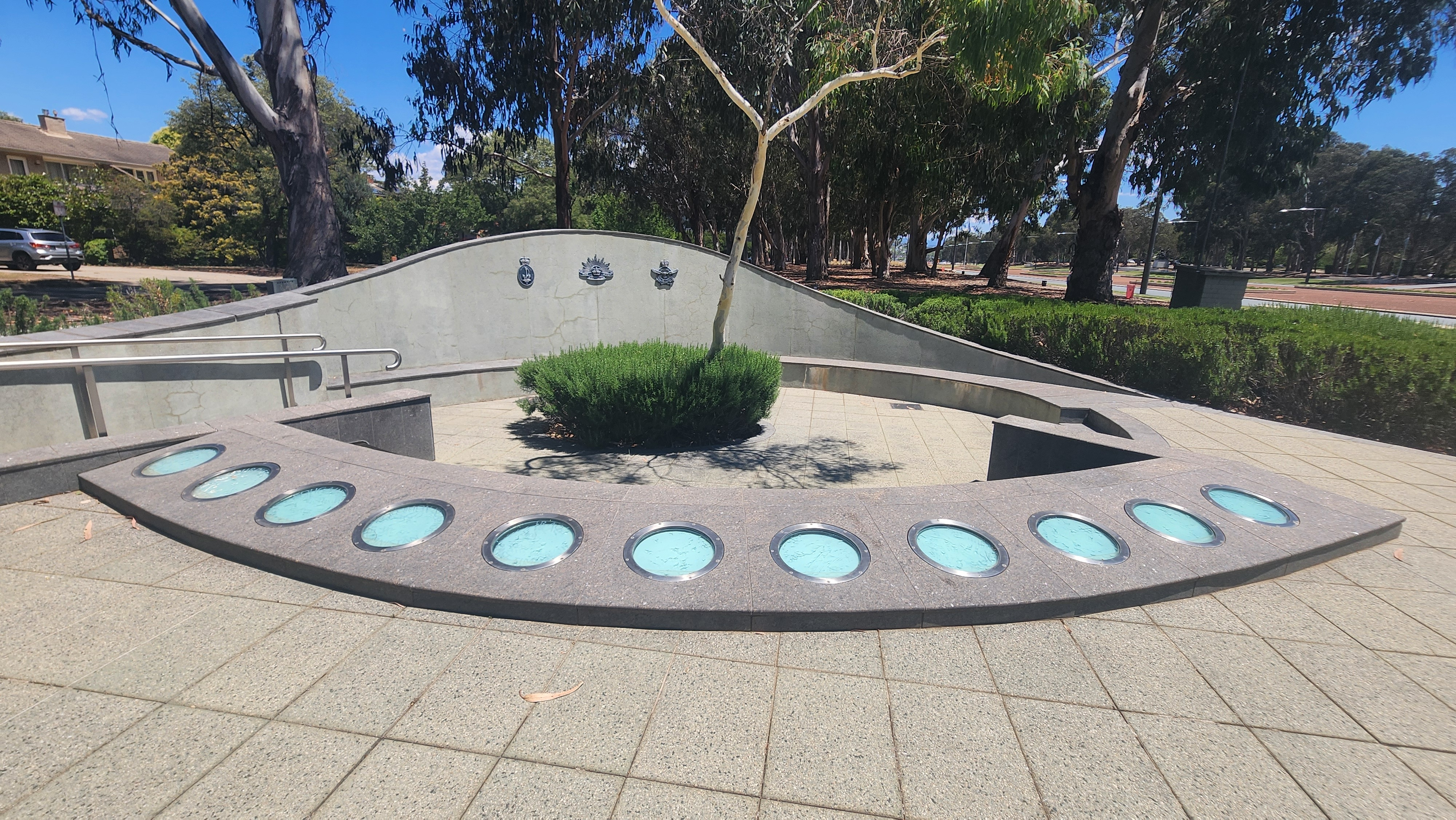
Commemorative area on the southern side of the memorial

The Australian Service Nurses National Memorial is on Anzac Parade, the principal ceremonial and memorial avenue of Canberra, the capital city of Australia.

The memorial honours past and present nurses of the Australian Defence Force, serving in the Royal Australian Navy, Australian Army, and Royal Australian Air Force and associated services.

The memorial is dedicated "In memory of Australian Service Nurses whose supreme sacrifice, courage and devotion were inspiring to those for whom they so willingly risked their lives. Their memory will also be our sacred trust." It was unveiled on 2 October 1999 by Sir William Deane AC K.B.E.

The memorial entrance is on Slater Street. The street is named for Patricia Violet Slater who was a lieutenant during World War Two.

== Sculpture ==
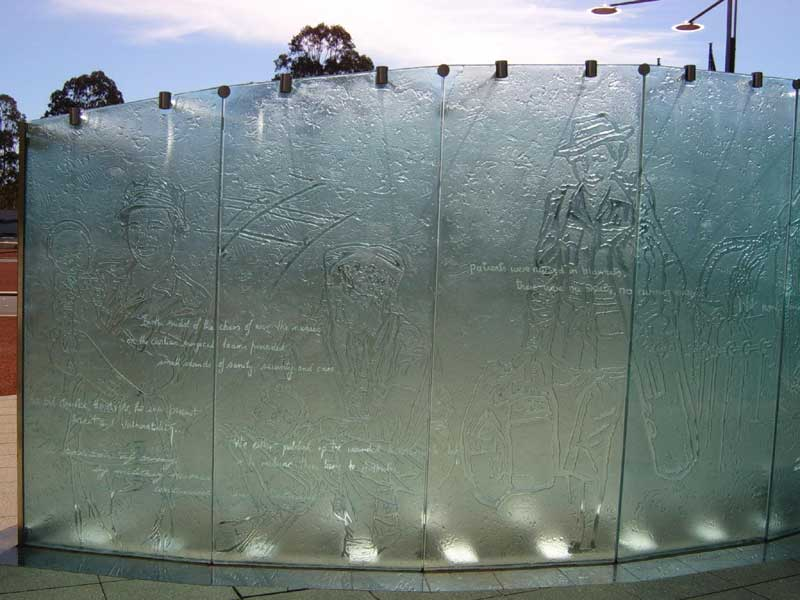
Detail of several of the glass panels

The memorial is made of cast glass. There are two waved lines each of two sets of panels. The front wall incorporates the words, "beyond all praise".

Etched and cast into the inner walls are text and images, in a timeline sequence, portraying the history and contribution of Australian Service Nursing. The memorial also incorporates a collage of pictures and diary entries in the original handwriting.

Some panels are blank, symbolic of the inconclusive nature of any memorial to a service group. The interlocking walls are symbolic of nurturing hands. A contemplative space surrounded with rosemary (for remembrance) has a reflective pool fountain and the symbols of the armed forces. There are also places for additional plaques to name occasions when nurses have served.

== Funding ==
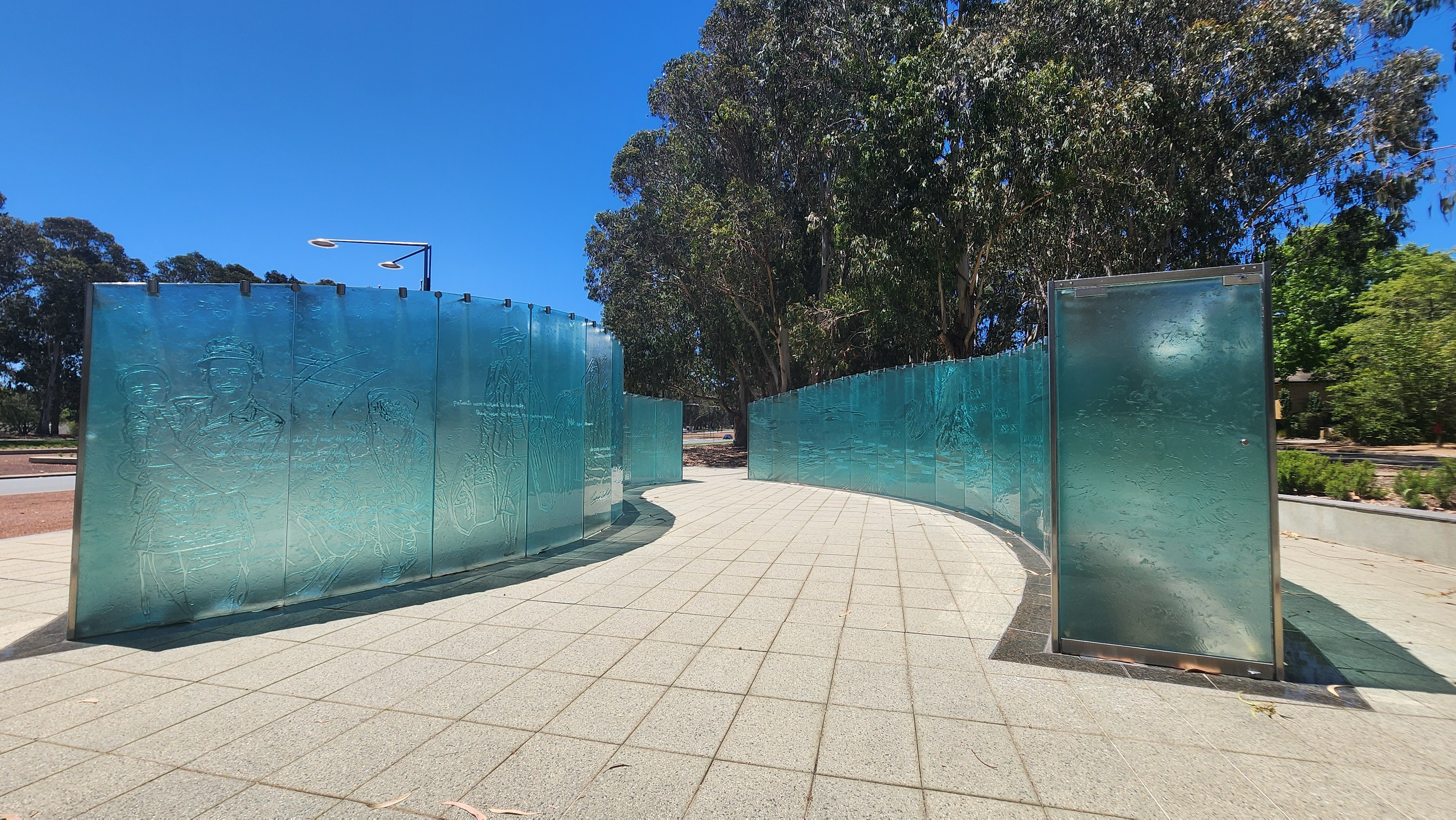
Inner panel (South to North view)

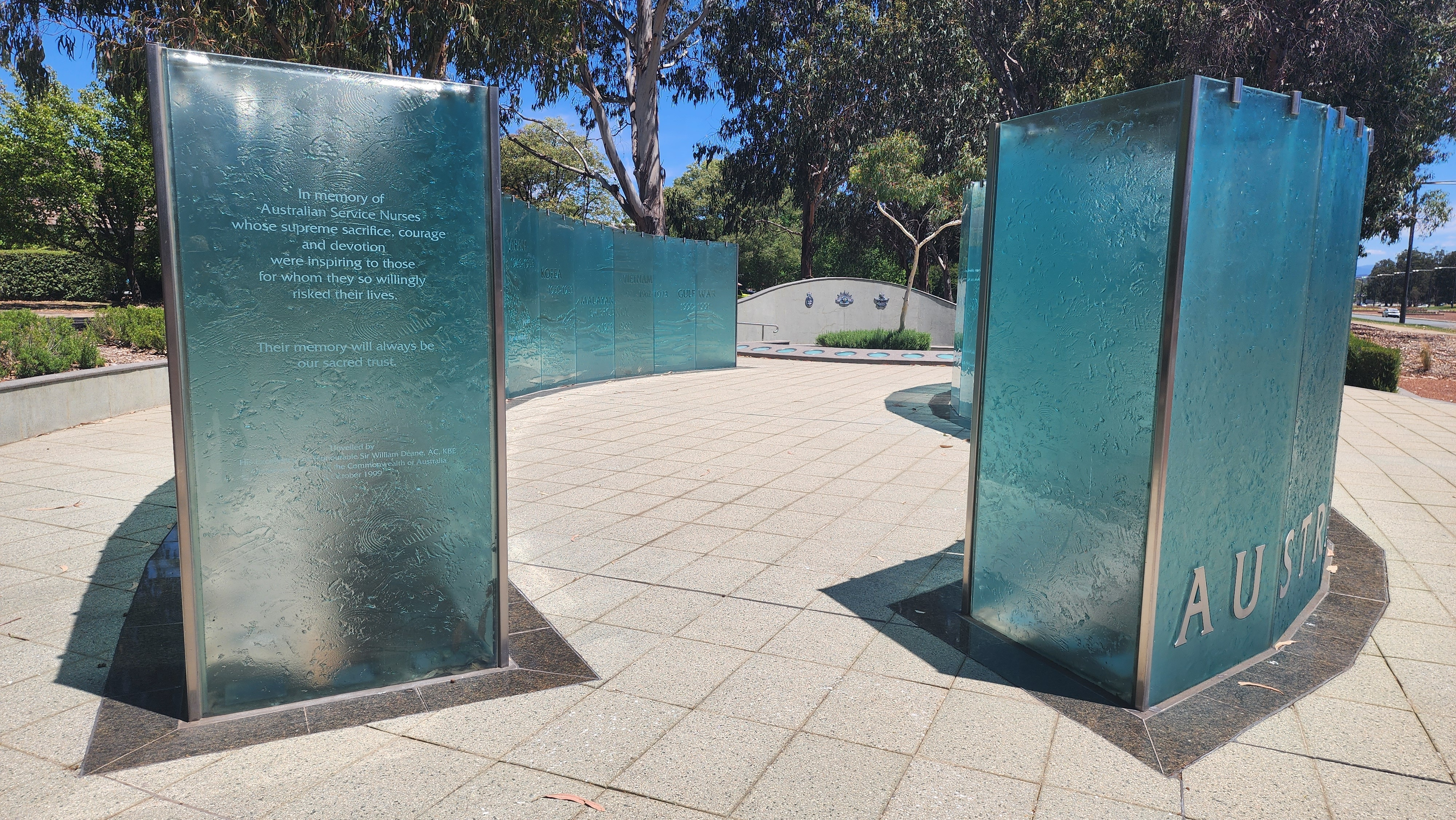
Inner panel (North to South view)

The memorial was funded through the efforts of the Australian Service Nurses National Memorial Fund Committee, whose members have included:

- Ita Buttrose
- Wilma Oram
- Betty Jeffrey
- Vivian Bullwinkel

Principal Donors to the memorial included:

- Australian Nursing Federation (Victorian Branch)
- Health Care Of Australia
- New South Wales Nurses' Association
- Nurses Board Of Victoria
- Nurses Board Of Western Australia
- Nurses Memorial Centre (Inc) Of Western Australia
- Nurses Registration Board Of New South Wales
- Returned Sisters Sub-Branch R &Sl (Queensland)
- Returned Sisters Sub-Branch R &Sl (South Australia)
- Royal College Of Nursing, Australia
- The Pratt Foundation
- The Queensland Nursing Council
- The Returned & Services League Of Australia
- The Wesley Hospital - Nursing Division
