= Lale Sokolov =

Slovak-Australian businessman and Holocaust survivor

- Sokolov in 1948
- Born: Ludwig Eisenberg; 28 October 1916; Krompachy, Slovakia
- Died: 31 October 2006 (aged 90); Melbourne, Australia

Ludwig ("Lali" or "Lale") Sokolov (né Eisenberg; 28 October 1916 – 31 October 2006) was an Austro-Hungarian-born Slovak-Australian businessman and Holocaust survivor.

== Biography ==
Lale Sokolov was born Ludwig Eisenberg on 28 October 1916 in Korompa, Kingdom of Hungary (now Krompachy, Slovakia). In April 1942, he was deported to Auschwitz as part of the Slovak government's participation in the Holocaust. Upon arrival at the extermination camp, he was tattooed with the number 32407. He was set to work constructing housing blocks for the expanding camp but soon became ill with typhus. Having recovered, he was assigned as one of the camp's Tätowierer (tattooist). As such, he was part of the Politische Abteilung and had an SS officer assigned to monitor him. His job meant he was "a step further away from death than the other prisoners", and he received a number of benefits such as a single room, extra rations, and free time when his work had been completed.

While in the camp, Sokolov met his future wife Gisela "Gita" Fuhrmannova. He was also involved in trading contraband with prisoners, SS officers, and locals.

Eight days before the liberation of Auschwitz by Soviet troops on 27 January 1945, Sokolov was moved to Mauthausen concentration camp in Austria. At Mauthausen his Jewish identity was unknown; when he was denounced for being Jewish by a fellow prisoner, he successfully denied the revelation and incited two allies to murder his betrayer in the steel mill's rollers. He escaped that concentration camp, and returned to Czechoslovakia. Knowing only Gita Fuhrmannova's name, he went to Bratislava, the main entry point for returning survivors, to search for her. The couple married later in 1945, and he changed his surname from Eisenberg to the more Russian-sounding Sokolov. He then opened a factory in Bratislava. During this time, he was involved in collecting money in support of the creation of the State of Israel. This activity, and the nationalization of industry by Czechoslovakia's then communist government, resulted in him being imprisoned and having his business seized. He was subsequently released and the couple emigrated to Australia in 1948.

In Australia, Sokolov and his wife settled in Melbourne and opened up a clothing factory. Their only child, Gary, was born in 1961. Though his wife visited Europe a number of times, Sokolov never returned. Following Gita's death in 2003, he finally felt able to speak about his war-time experience, having feared that he would be perceived as a collaborator.

He was interviewed by journalist Heather Morris over the next three years, resulting in the publication of The Tattooist of Auschwitz in 2018. While the book was billed as historical fiction, it generated controversy because of a perception that its marketing and content suggested historical accuracy despite departures from the truth and presenting a hagiographic rendition of a complicated biography. Sokolov died in 2006, survived by his son.

== In popular culture ==
On 2 May 2024, a miniseries based on The Tattooist of Auschwitz by Morris, was released, starring Harvey Keitel as Lale Sokolov, Jonah Hauer-King as young Lale Sokolov, and Anna Próchniak as Gita.

== See also ==
- List of victims and survivors of Auschwitz
