= Edith Hughes-Jones =

Nurse and hospital proprietor (1905–1976)

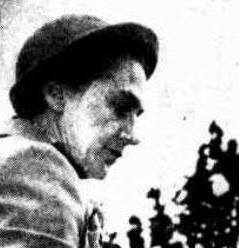
- Born: 10 March 1905; Tungamah, Victoria, Australia
- Died: 15 April 1976 (aged 71); Prahran, Victoria, Australia
- Occupation: Nurse
- Known for: Charitable works

Edith Hughes-Jones, OBE (10 March 1905 – 15 April 1976) was an Australian nurse and hospital proprietor. She took a leading role in creating memorials to the Australian nurses of the Second World War.

== Early life ==
Hughes-Jones was born on 10 March 1905 in Tungamah. Her parents were Agnes Edith (née Hardy) and her husband Rev. William Thomas Jones. Her father was Methodist minister and she had an elder brother William Eric Archer Hughes-Jones who became a leading surgeon.

== Nursing and charitable activities ==
Hughes-Jones became a nurse and a matron and she was able to find funds to buy the Windarra hospital where she had worked. That hospital had been started by Florence MacDowell. She then started the Windermere Hospital in 1938 where she was the owner and the matron.

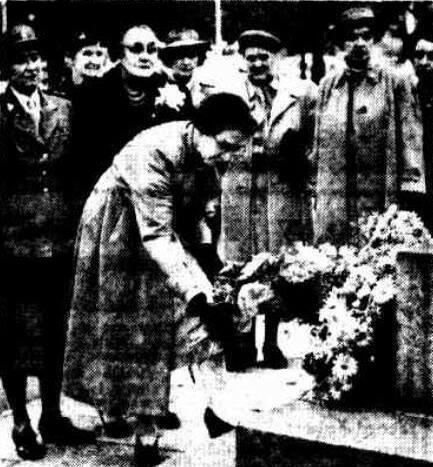
Edith Hughes-Jones on the 11th anniversary of the sinking of the Centaur in 1954 laying a wreath on the Edith Cavell memorial in Melbourne

In 1943 AHS Centaur was sunk by a Japanese submarine. It was a hospital ship and over 260 lives were lost, including eleven nurses. Australia was outraged and Hughes-Jones established the Centaur War Nurses' Memorial Trust and she became its honorary secretary. One of the nurses killed had been a deputy matron to Hughes-Jones. Ellen Savage was the only surviving nurse from the Centaur.

Hughes-Jones had started to raise money for a nurses' memorial and she supported nurses Betty Jeffrey and Vivian Bullwinkel, who had been prisoners of war, as they visited every sizable hospital in Victoria to raise money that created the Australian Nurses Memorial Centre. She is noted as a founder together with Wilma Oram and Annie Sage. The Nurses Memorial Centre in Melbourne opened in 1949 to honour the heroism of nurses.

== Death and legacy ==
Hughes-Jones died on 15 April 1976 in the Melbourne suburb of Prahran. Her Windermere Hospital created a charitable foundation in the 1970s. The hospital was sold in 1998 but the foundation survives and it gives grants to "continue Edith Hughes-Jones legacy".
