= Paradise Road (1997 film) =

- Theatrical release poster
- Directed by: Bruce Beresford
- Screenplay by: Bruce Beresford
- Story by: David Giles; Martin Meader
- Based on: The diaries of Betty Jeffrey
- Produced by: Sue Milliken
- Starring: Glenn Close; Frances McDormand; Pauline Collins; Cate Blanchett; Jennifer Ehle; Julianna Margulies
- Cinematography: Peter James
- Edited by: Tim Wellburn
- Music by: Ross Edwards
- Distributed by: Roadshow Film Distributors (Australia and New Zealand); Fox Searchlight Pictures (International)
- Release dates: 11 April 1997 (United States); 5 June 1997 (Australia)
- Running time: 122 minutes
- Country: Australia
- Languages: English; Japanese; Dutch; Chinese; Malay
- Budget: $19 million
- Box office: $4 million (Australia/US)

Paradise Road is a 1997 Australian war drama film directed by Bruce Beresford, about a group of English, American, Dutch, and Australian women who are imprisoned by the Japanese in Sumatra during World War II. It stars Glenn Close, Frances McDormand, Pauline Collins, Julianna Margulies, Jennifer Ehle, Cate Blanchett, and Elizabeth Spriggs. The film received mixed reviews from critics.

== Plot ==
At Raffles Hotel in Singapore, a dance for soldiers and their families is interrupted by the Battle of Singapore and a bomb exploding outside the club. The women and children are immediately collected and carried off by a boat to a safer location. A few hours out, the boat is bombed by Japanese fighter planes, causing the passengers to jump overboard.

Three women - tea planter's wife Adrienne Pargiter, model Rosemary Leighton-Jones and Australian nurse Susan Macarthy - swim their way to the shores of the island of Sumatra. The women are found by a Japanese officer, Captain Tanaka, and ushered firstly to a deserted village and then a prison camp in the jungle where they are reunited with the rest of the women and children from the boat. At the camp, the women are forced to bow to the Japanese officers and its flag, as well as endure sexual violence (such as potential rape or sexual assault), torture, and hard labour despite the brutal living conditions and constant sickness. Some of the women choose to work in a brothel as voluntary prostitutes for Japanese officers for better treatment and decent food.

Two years later, Adrienne and missionary Daisy "Margaret" Drummond decided to create a vocal orchestra to encourage the women, even though social and religious meetings had been prohibited by the Japanese officers. Although it provides a temporary relief, the women soon become disenchanted with it and dwindle in numbers. After some time, the women are moved to a new location where they will remain for the duration of the war.

Eventually, the war ends and the choir performs for a final time before rejoicing in their freedom.

== Cast ==
In credits order:

- Glenn Close as Adrienne Pargiter (based on Norah Chambers)
- Frances McDormand as Dr. Verstak
- Pauline Collins as Daisy "Margaret" Drummond (based on Margaret Dryburgh)
- Julianna Margulies as Topsy Merritt
- Cate Blanchett as Susan Macarthy
- Jennifer Ehle as Rosemary Leighton-Jones
- Wendy Hughes as Mrs. Dickson
- Johanna ter Steege as Sister Wilhelmina
- Elizabeth Spriggs as Mrs. Roberts
- Pamela Rabe as Mrs. Tippler
- Clyde Kusatsu as Sergeant Tomiashi, 'The Snake'
- Stan Egi as Captain Tanaka
- David Chung as Mr. Tomio
- Sab Shimono as Colonel Hirota
- Penne Hackforth-Jones as Mrs. Pike
- Pauline Chan as Wing
- Lisa Hensley as Edna
- Susie Porter as Oggi
- Anita Hegh as Bett
- Tessa Humphries as Celia Roberts
- Lia Scallon as Mrs. O'Riordan
- Marta Dusseldorp as Helen van Praagh
- Marijke Mann as Mrs. Cronje
- Aden Young as Bill Seary
- Paul Bishop as Dennis Leighton-Jones
- Stephen O'Rourke as William Pargiter
- Vincent Ball as Mr. Dickson
- Nicholas Hammond as Marty Merritt
- Steven Grives as Westmacott
- Robert Grubb as Colonel Downes
- Arthur Dignam as Mr. Pike
- Tanya Bird as Siobhan O'Riordan
- Alwine Seinen as Millie
- Kitty Clignett as Sister Anna
- Shira Van Essen as Antoinette van Praagh
- Yoshi Adachi as Mr. Moto
- Mitsu Sato as Rags
- Taka Nagano as Boris
- Koji Sasaki as Lefty
- Julie Anthony as Female Vocalist
- Geoffrey Ogden-Brown as Band Leader
- Jason Arden as Edgar
- Kristine McAlister as Matron Heffernan
- Jesse Rosenfeld as Danny Tippler
- Phillip Stork as Michael Tippler
- John Elcock as Seaman Francis
- Hamish Urquhart as Aran O'Riordan
- Jemal Blattner as Older Aran O'Riordan
- John Proper as Captain Murchison
- Shigenori Ito as Dr. Mizushima
- Geoff O'Halloran as Sailor
- Chi Yuen Lee as Chinese Man
- Ping Pan as Chinese Man

== Production ==
The story is based on the testimony of Betty Jeffrey, as written in her 1954 book White Coolies. The 1965 book Song of Survival by Helen Colijn (granddaughter of Hendrikus Colijn), another camp survivor, is not listed in the film's credits as being a source for this film, although Colijn is thanked for her help in the credits.

According to the media information kit for the film, Martin Meader and David Giles researched the story since 1991 and met with survivors from the camp and choir. Meader and Giles wrote the original screenplay which was titled "A Voice Cries Out". Graeme Rattigan then joined Meader and Giles and together the three traveled the world, raising $8.275 million for the film. They met Beresford in London and he immediately became interested in the project. Together with Village Roadshow, Beresford took over the film, re-wrote the script and renamed the project Paradise Road.

Beresford and producer Sue Milliken then did their own research of the story for over more than two years, by reading books and unpublished diaries on the subject and by interviewing survivors. Meader and Giles got a "Story by" credit, and with Rattigan, they all received a Co-Executive Producer Credit. Their company, Planet Pictures, received an "In Association With" credit.

The film represents an alternative take on female imprisonment by the Japanese during World War II compared with BBC's dramatic offering from the early 1980s, Tenko. Some criticism of the film's historical accuracy is discussed in an article by Professor Hank Nelson.

Fox provided $19 million of the budget with $6 million coming from Singapore businessman Andrew Yap.

The role of Dr Verstak was originally offered to Anjelica Huston, who demanded more profit share than the filmmakers were willing to give, so Frances McDormand was cast instead. The part of Margaret Drummond was to be played by Jean Simmons but she had to withdraw due to illness; the studio wanted Joan Plowright but she accepted another offer and Pauline Collins wound up being cast. Fox was reluctant to cast Cate Blanchett in the lead as she was relatively unknown at the time but Beresford insisted.

Production took place in Marrickville (Sydney), Singapore, Port Douglas and Penang.

== Historical context ==
During World War II, many women became prisoners of war and faced a twenty to fifty percent death rate in Japanese prison camps. However, many women prisoners of war stories have been overlooked, except the women POWs of Sumatra. Thousands of British and Dutch colonists made the East Indies their home. Singapore was the most popular living option with the Raffles Hotel, shops, and beautiful houses, which attracted many soldiers and their wives. The Japanese armed forces attacked Pearl Harbor, Malaysia, Singapore, and Hong Kong on 7 December 1941. Europeans held the Japanese forces to an inferior level and put their trust in the British navy that guarded Singapore. But the Japanese advanced on British military lines captured the British airfield, and dropped bombs on the city, which led to a retreat by the British forces. On 15 February 1942, the Japanese took Singapore.

Due to the belief that the city was safe, many women and children remained in Singapore when the city was attacked. The inhabitants of the city, including women and children, ran to board ships to flee the island. Some of these ships housed the women POWs of Sumatra. The "Vyner Brooke" contained 65 nurses from the Australian Army Nursing Service. It reached the Banka Strait before the Japanese attacked and released bombs over the ship. The women and children were forced to jump overboard to save their lives, but the Japanese continued to fire on the women in the water.

The survivors swam ashore to Banka Island. One of the Australian nurses suggested the women and children head toward a village on the island while the nurses remained on the beach to care for the men's wounds. When the Japanese discovered them, the men were rounded up, and twenty-two of the nurses were forced back into the water where they were shot by the soldiers. Only Vivian Bullwinkel survived after the soldiers opened fire. Bullwinkel later found the rest of the nurses that survived the sinking of the ship. The women were transferred from Banka Island to Sumatra. Some survived the multiple voyages back and forth between the islands for three and a half years. The women were living in the Sumatra prison camp when the war ended and a rescue came for the survivors.

== Reception ==
On the review aggregator website Rotten Tomatoes, the film has a 48% approval rating, based on 23 reviews, with an average rating of 5.9/10. On Metacritic, the film received a weighted average score of 48 out of 100, based on 18 critics, indicating "mixed or average reviews". Audiences polled by CinemaScore gave the film an average grade of "A−" on an A+ to F scale.

The film opened on 11 April 1997 on 9 screens in the United States and Canada and grossed $62,518 for the weekend. It went on to gross $2,007,100. It opened in Australia on 5 June 1997 on 85 screens and grossed $692,788 for the week, placing fifth at the Australian box office. It went on to gross A$2,970,653.

== See also ==
- White Coolies
- Tenko
- Cinema of Australia

== Bibliography ==
- Milliken, Sue Selective Memory: My Life in Film
- Leslie, Carolyn (June 2014). "Finding wartime women in 'Paradise road'". Screen Education (74). Victoria, Australia: Society for Education in Film and Television: 124–128. ISSN 1449-857X.
