= Patricia Violet Slater =

Australian nurse and educator (1918 – 1990)

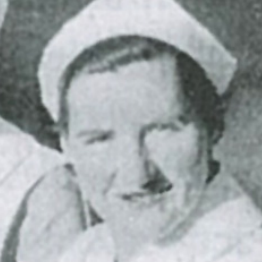
- Training in 1941
- Born: 6 December 1918; St Kilda, Melbourne, Victoria, Australia
- Died: 2 October 1990 (aged 71); Melbourne, Victoria, Australia
- Occupations: Nurse and nurse educator

Patricia Violet Slater (6 December 1918 – 2 October 1990) was an Australian nurse and nurse educator. Slater was the Director of the College of Nursing and under her guidance the college offered the first undergraduate nurse-education course in Australia.

The Australian Service Nurses National Memorial entrance is on Slater Street. The street is named for Slater who was a lieutenant during World War Two.

== Early life and education ==
Slater was born at St Kilda in Melbourne on 16 December 1918, the second child of Edward Brunton Slater (a Victorian-born civil engineer) and his wife, Violet Podmore. She was educated from 1926 to 1936 at Geelong's Church of England Girls' Grammar School, the Hermitage.

== Career ==
Patricia commenced her nursing education at Melbourne Royal Children's Hospital in 1937. She pursued further training in adult nursing at the Alfred Hospital. In 1942, she obtained a midwifery certificate from the Royal Women's Hospital, followed by an infant welfare certificate from the Karitane Home in Sydney in 1947. During and after World War II, from 1943 to 1947, Pat served as a lieutenant in the Australian Army Nursing Service, Australian Imperial Force using her nursing skills in various hospitals across Victoria and Queensland. Notably, she provided care at the 2/4th Australian General Hospital and 2/1st Casualty Clearing Station on Morotai and Labuan islands, located in the Dutch East Indies, during 1945–46. Following the war, Slater embarked on a journey of work and exploration in Australia, Britain, and Europe until 1955. It was in this year that she commenced her career as a nursing instructor at the Royal Melbourne Hospital.

She became the Director of the College of Nursing and under her guidance the college offered the first undergraduate nurse-education course in Australia. This was to transform the teaching of nursing in Australia.

== Death ==
Patricia Slater was diagnosed with leukemia and on 2 October 1990 she died aged 72.

== Legacy ==
The Royal College of Nursing, Australia (RCNA) gives the Patricia Slater award. In 2024 the body she directed (now part of the Australian College of Nursing) offered over twenty different graduate level courses for nurses.
