= Oleg (film) =

2019 film

- Film poster
- Oļegs
- Directed by: Juris Kursietis
- Written by: Juris Kursietis; Līga Celma-Kursiete; Kaspars Odiņš
- Starring: Valentin Novopolskij
- Cinematography: Bogumil Godfrejow
- Edited by: Matyas Veress
- Production company: Tasse Film
- Distributed by: Arizona Distribution
- Release date: 17 May 2019 (Cannes)
- Running time: 108 minutes
- Countries: Latvia; Lithuania; Belgium
- Languages: Latvian; Russian

Oleg (Latvian: Oļegs) is a 2019 Latvian drama film directed by Juris Kursietis. It was screened in the Directors' Fortnight section at the 2019 Cannes Film Festival.

== Plot ==
Oleg (Oļegs) is a non-citizen of Latvia of Russian origin and a butcher by profession, who searches for a better life by working in a Belgian meat factory. However, his status makes it difficult to make a profit, and after he loses his job, Oleg becomes dependent on migrant workers, who are a part of the local Polish mafia. When the seemingly lowest point in his life has been reached, he finds enough strength to bounce back and forces himself to make a decision to flee, which at first seems impossible. The story is reportedly based on real events.

== Cast ==
- Valentin Novopolskij as Oleg
- Dawid Ogrodnik as Andrzej
- Anna Próchniak as Malgosia

== Accolades ==
Oleg won the Grand Prix, National Competition, at the 2019 Brussels International Film Festival (BRIFF).
