= Summerwater =

British television series

- Based on: Summerwater by Sarah Moss
- Screenplay by: John Donnelly
- Directed by: Robert McKillop; Fiona Walton
- Starring: Dougray Scott; Shirley Henderson; Valene Kane; Arnas Fedaravičius; Anna Próchniak; Gabriel Scott; Daniel Rigby; Shereen Cutkelvin
- Country of origin: United Kingdom
- Original language: English
- No. of series: 1
- No. of episodes: 6

Production
- Executive producer: Mike Ellen
- Producer: Jules Hissey
- Running time: 50 minutes
- Production company: Freedom Scripted

Original release
- Network: Channel 4
- Release: 16 November 2025 – present

Summerwater is a British television drama set in Scotland, adapted from the novel of the same name by Sarah Moss. The ensemble cast includes Dougray Scott, Shirley Henderson, Valene Kane, Arnas Fedaravičius, Anna Próchniak and Daniel Rigby. It first broadcast on Channel 4 on 16 November 2025.

== Premise ==
Tensions arise amidst a disparate group of holidaymakers in a rural Scottish holiday park.

== Cast ==
- Dougray Scott as David Campbell.
- Shirley Henderson as Annie Campbell.
- Valene Kane as Justine Tindall.
- Arnas Fedaravičius as Marijonas Zaliskevicius.
- Anna Próchniak as Alina Piotrowska.
- Gabriel Scott as young David.
- Daniel Rigby as Steve Tindall.
- Shereen Cutkelvin as Millie Nkene.
- Anders Hayward as Josh.
- James Harkness as Gavin Macquoid.
- Shauna Macdonald as Rachel Henderson.
- Jamie Sives as Ian Henderson.

== Production ==
The six-part series is based on the book of the same name by Sarah Moss (2020), adapted by John Donnelly with Robert McKillop and Fiona Walton directing episodes. Moss took her title for the book from William Watson poem The Ballad of Semerwater in which a village population is punished for not helping an "aged man". It is produced by Freedom Scripted in association with All3Media International with support from Screen Scotland. Mike Ellen is the executive producer with Jules Hussey the series producer.

The ensemble cast includes Dougray Scott, Shirley Henderson, Valene Kane, Arnas Fedaravičius, Anna Próchniak and Gabriel Scott, as well as Daniel Rigby, Shereen Cutkelvin, Anders Hayward, James Harkness, Shauna Macdonald and Jamie Sives.

Filming took place in Scotland and was completed by April 2025.

== Broadcast ==
The six-part series began airing on Channel 4 on 16 November 2025, along with being released in full on their streaming service.
