= The Tattooist of Auschwitz (TV series) =

British/American/Australian/Italian Television series

- Based on: The Tattooist of Auschwitz by Heather Morris
- Screenplay by: Jacquelin Perske; Evan Placey; Gabbie Asher
- Directed by: Tali Shalom Ezer
- Starring: Jonah Hauer-King; Melanie Lynskey; Anna Próchniak; Jonas Nay; Harvey Keitel
- Music by: Hans Zimmer; Kara Talve
- Countries of origin: Italy; Australia; United Kingdom; United States
- Original languages: English; Slovak; German
- No. of episodes: 6

Production
- Executive producers: Claire Mundell; Jacquelin Perske; Serena Thompson; Mark Young; Zai Bennett; Adrian Burns
- Production companies: Synchronicity Films; Sky Studios

Original release
- Network: Stan (Australia); Sky Atlantic (United Kingdom); Peacock (United States)
- Release: 2 May 2024

The Tattooist of Auschwitz is a 2024 six-part historical drama based on the novel of the same name by Heather Morris. The cast includes Harvey Keitel, Melanie Lynskey, Jonah Hauer-King, and Anna Próchniak.

== Synopsis ==
Lali Sokolov, a Jewish prisoner in the Auschwitz-Birkenau concentration camp during World War II is given the job of tattooing identification numbers on fellow prisoners’ arms.

== Cast and characters ==
- Harvey Keitel as "Lali" Sokolov
  - Jonah Hauer-King as younger Lali
- Melanie Lynskey as Heather Morris
- Anna Próchniak as Gita
- Jonas Nay as Stefan Baretzki
- Tallulah Haddon as Hanna
- Mili Eshet as Ivana
- Avital Lvova as Marta
- Yali Topol Margalith as Cilka
- Katie Bernstein as Goldie Sokolov
- Phénix Brossard as Leon
- Adam Karst as Pepan
- Yoav Rotman as Mordowicz
- Frederik von Lüttichau as Houstek
- Oleksandr Yatsenko as Vlad

== Episodes ==
No.	Title	Directed by	Written by	Original release date
1	"Episode 1"	Tali Shalom Ezer	Jacquelin Perske	May 2, 2024
2	"Episode 2"	Tali Shalom Ezer	Jacquelin Perske	May 2, 2024
3	"Episode 3"	Tali Shalom Ezer	Evan Placey	May 2, 2024
4	"Episode 4"	Tali Shalom Ezer	Gabbie Asher	May 2, 2024
5	"Episode 5"	Tali Shalom Ezer	Jacquelin Perske	May 2, 2024
6	"Episode 6"	Tali Shalom Ezer	Jacquelin Perske	May 2, 2024

== Production ==
The Creative Director of Synchronicity Films, Claire Mundell secured the rights to The Tattooist of Auschwitz after making a deal with Bonnier Books UK in 2018. In 2023 it was announced that Synchronicity Films were developing a six-part series for Sky Studios and Peacock. It will be directed by Tali Shalom Ezer with Jacquelin Perske as lead writer. Claire Mundell and Perske are among the executive producers. Australian streaming service Stan also co-commissioned the series, with All3Media onboard worldwide sales. The production got underway in the spring of 2023.

=== Casting ===
In March 2023, Jonah Hauer-King, Anna Próchniak, and Melanie Lynskey were cast. In April 2023, Harvey Keitel joined the cast as older Lale Sokolov.

=== Music ===
The series is being scored by Hans Zimmer and Kara Talve; the two wrote the music with Walter Afanasieff, lyrics by Charlie Midnight for the original song "Love Will Survive", performed by Barbra Streisand for the series closing. The song was released as a single on April 25, 2024.

== Broadcast ==
The series first aired on Peacock on 2 May 2024, and was broadcast in the UK on Sky Atlantic the same day.

== Reception ==
The review aggregator website Rotten Tomatoes reported a 76% approval rating with an average rating of 6.5/10, based on 34 critic reviews. The website's critics consensus reads, "A dramatization of atrocity and the fickleness of memory that can be difficult to watch, The Tattooist of Auschwitz is dramatically uneven but undeniably affecting." Metacritic, which uses a weighted average, assigned a score of 61 out of 100 based on 16 critics, indicating "generally favorable reviews".

Karl Quinn of The Sydney Morning Herald states that though the love story between Gita and Lali was compelling, the "willingness to grapple with the unreliability of memory that this Tattooist make [sic] its strongest mark."

Robert Lloyd of the Los Angeles Times wrote that Hauer-King and Próchniak were "sweet and sad" as Lali and Gita, with the conceit that "it's easier to see what he saw in her than what she saw in him" due to Próchniak making an "especially strong impression." Lloyd also said that the use of ghosts haunting Lali as a physical representation of his survivor's guilt felt trite due to overuse.

=== Accolades ===
The series was nominated for the 2025 Visual Effects Society Award for Outstanding Supporting Visual Effects in a Photoreal Episode. The series won a Royal Television Society Craft and Design award for Best Effects - VFX at the 2024 RTS Craft and Design awards. The series was also nominated for the 2025 British Academy Scotland Award for Best Scripted Television and Anna Próchniak was nominated for Best Actress (film/television).
