= Florence MacDowell =

Australian nurse (1873-1939)

- Florence MacDowell, c. 1912
- Born: Florence Ina MacDowell; 23 April 1873; Victoria, Australia
- Died: 25 April 1939 (aged 66); Victoria, Australia

Florence Ina MacDowell (c.1870s – 25 April 1939) was an Australian nurse who served in World War I.

== Early life ==
MacDowell was born in the mid-1870s in Melbourne to Swanston Hay MacDowell and Kathleen Champ. She trained as a nurse at the Alfred Hospital in Melbourne, Victoria and the Queens Hospital in Adelaide, South Australia.

== Career ==
After completing her training, MacDowell opened her own private hospital called ‘Windarra' at Toorak in Melbourne. That hospital was bought by the future philanthropist Edith Hughes-Jones. She left it to travel in Europe and was on the island of Elba in Tuscany, Italy when war broke out in 1914. MacDowell travelled to England and joined the British Red Cross. She was sent to a Red Cross hospital in Serbia, where she nursed until early 1916 when the German army overwhelmed the Serbian forces and she was evacuated back to England. Her obituary stated that she "narrowly escaped" being made a prisoner of war by the Germans during the retreat.

Back in England, MacDowell joined the Millicent Fawcett Union, under the British Red Cross, and later in 1916 returned to Europe as the matron of an 80-bed hospital in Volhynia, Russia. The hospital had been established as an infectious hospital for civilians and soldiers and was located almost 100 kilometres behind the Galician Front. Patients predominantly suffered from scarlet fever, erysipelas, smallpox and dysentery. MacDowell moved to a new position as matron of a surgical hospital at Podgorica, but in July 1917 the German forces again broke through and MacDowell's unit was evacuated back to England.

MacDowell stayed in England and began working as an Investigator for the British Branch of the Board of Pensions Commissions, initially for the Canadian government and then for the Australian. After this, she worked on the east coast of Canada in immigration, before returning to England to work for the children's charity Barnado's. She later returned to Australia and worked with the first boys to immigrate to Sydney under the Barnados child migration scheme.

MacDowell died in Melbourne on 25 April 1939 after a long illness.
