= Sarah Moss =

Scottish writer and academic (born 1975)

Sarah Moss FRSL
- Born: 1975 (age 50–51); Glasgow, Scotland
- Education: University of Oxford (BA, Master of Studies and D.Phil)
- Occupations: Writer and academic
- Notable work: Ghost Wall (2018)
- Awards: Jerwood Fiction Uncovered Prize

Sarah Moss FRSL (born 1975) is an English writer and academic. She has published eight novels and two memoirs, as well as a number of non-fiction works and academic texts. A ninth novel, Ripeness, was published in 2025. Her work has been nominated three times for the Wellcome Book Prize. She was appointed assistant professor of Creative Writing at University College Dublin's School of English, Drama and Film in the Republic of Ireland with effect from September 2020. She was a regular contributor to the Irish Times until September 2026 when she signed off with her last column, citing online abuse including death threats.

== Biography ==
Sarah Moss was born in Glasgow, Scotland, and at the age of two moved with her family to Manchester, England, where she lived until the age of 18, when she went to study at the University of Oxford. During the ten years she spent in Oxford, she earned a BA, Master of Studies and D.Phil. in English Literature, and then held a postdoctoral research fellowship.

From 2004 to 2009, she was a lecturer at the University of Kent. Following the publication in 2009 of her first novel, Cold Earth, Moss went to teach for a year at the University of Iceland. She then took up a post as Senior Lecturer in Literature and Place at the University of Exeter's Penryn Campus in Cornwall, and subsequently moved to the University of Warwick, becoming Director of the Warwick Writing Programme, teaching creative writing. Since September 2020 she has been assistant professor of Creative Writing at University College Dublin's School of English.

== Ghost Wall ==
Moss published Ghost Wall in 2018, a novel that was shortlisted for the Polari Prize and Ondaatje Prize, and longlisted for the Women's Prize for Fiction in 2019.

Moss creates a motif of light at the outset of her Ondaatje Prize-nominated text, Ghost Wall, as a female character is brought out, "not blindfolded", but with her "eyes widened" to "the last light" of the day and also quite possibly of her life. This foreshadowing narrative at the outset is an historic representation of a social evil that occurred in medieval England many centuries ago among those communities that practised human sacrifice.

As the novel continues, we meet the Hampton family, who are involved in a re-enactment of life in northern England 2500 years ago, while the insidious influence of the racist and sexist Englishman Bill Hampton upon his wife Alison and his smart, seventeen-year-old daughter Silvie is slowly revealed.

This text is intended to "shake up" the reader with its presentation of the nefarious role that personal power politics plays in domestic abuse, a highly pertinent theme for today.

The Independent called the novel "inventive, intelligent, and like no other author's work".

== Awards and honours ==
Moss's 2011 novel Night Waking won the Jerwood Fiction Uncovered Prize. Her non-fiction book Names for the Sea: Strangers in Iceland was shortlisted for the Royal Society of Literature's Ondaatje Prize in 2013. In 2015, her novel Bodies of Light was shortlisted for the Wellcome Book Prize, and her novels Signs for Lost Children and The Tidal Zone were also shortlisted for the same award in 2016 and 2017 respectively. Her 2018 novel Ghost Wall was shortlisted for the Ondaatje Prize and the Polari Prize, and was longlisted for the 2019 Women's Prize for Fiction.

Moss was elected a Fellow of the Royal Society of Literature (FRSL) in 2019.

== Personal life ==
Moss lives in Dún Laoghaire, Co. Dublin with her husband and has two adult sons. She describes herself as a "bike-riding vegetarian feminist".

== Bibliography ==
=== Novels ===
- Cold Earth (Granta Books, 2009)
- Night Waking (Granta, 2011)
- Bodies of Light (Granta, 2014)
- Signs for Lost Children (Granta, 2015)
- The Tidal Zone (Granta, 2016)
- Ghost Wall (Granta, 2018)
- Summerwater (Pan Macmillan, 2020) (Note: "Summerwater by Sarah Moss". Pan Macmillan.)
- The Fell (Pan Macmillan, 2021)
- Ripeness (Pan Macmillan, 2025) (Note: Moss, Sarah (01/10/2026). "The Winter Guest by Sarah Moss". Pan Macmillan.)
- The Winter Guest (Pan Macmillan, 2026)

=== Non-fiction ===
- The Frozen Ship (2006)
- Scott’s Last Biscuit: the literature of polar exploration (2006)
- Spilling the Beans: reading, writing, eating and cooking in British women's fiction 1770 – 1830
- Chocolate: A Global History (2009)
- Names for the Sea: Strangers in Iceland (Granta, 2012)
- My Good Bright Wolf (2024)

=== Critical studies and reviews of Moss's work ===
Summerwater

- Robson, Leo (22 March 2021). "Old habits : in Sarah Moss's novel 'Summerwater,' there's no holiday from history". The Critics. Books. The New Yorker. 97 (5): 69–71. (Note: Online version is titled "In Sarah Moss's fiction, there's no holiday from history".)

== Adaptations ==
A six-part television series adaptation of Summerwater, starring Dougray Scott and Shirley Henderson among others, was aired in the United Kingdom on Channel 4 in November 2025.
