= Anna Próchniak =

Polish actress (born 1988)

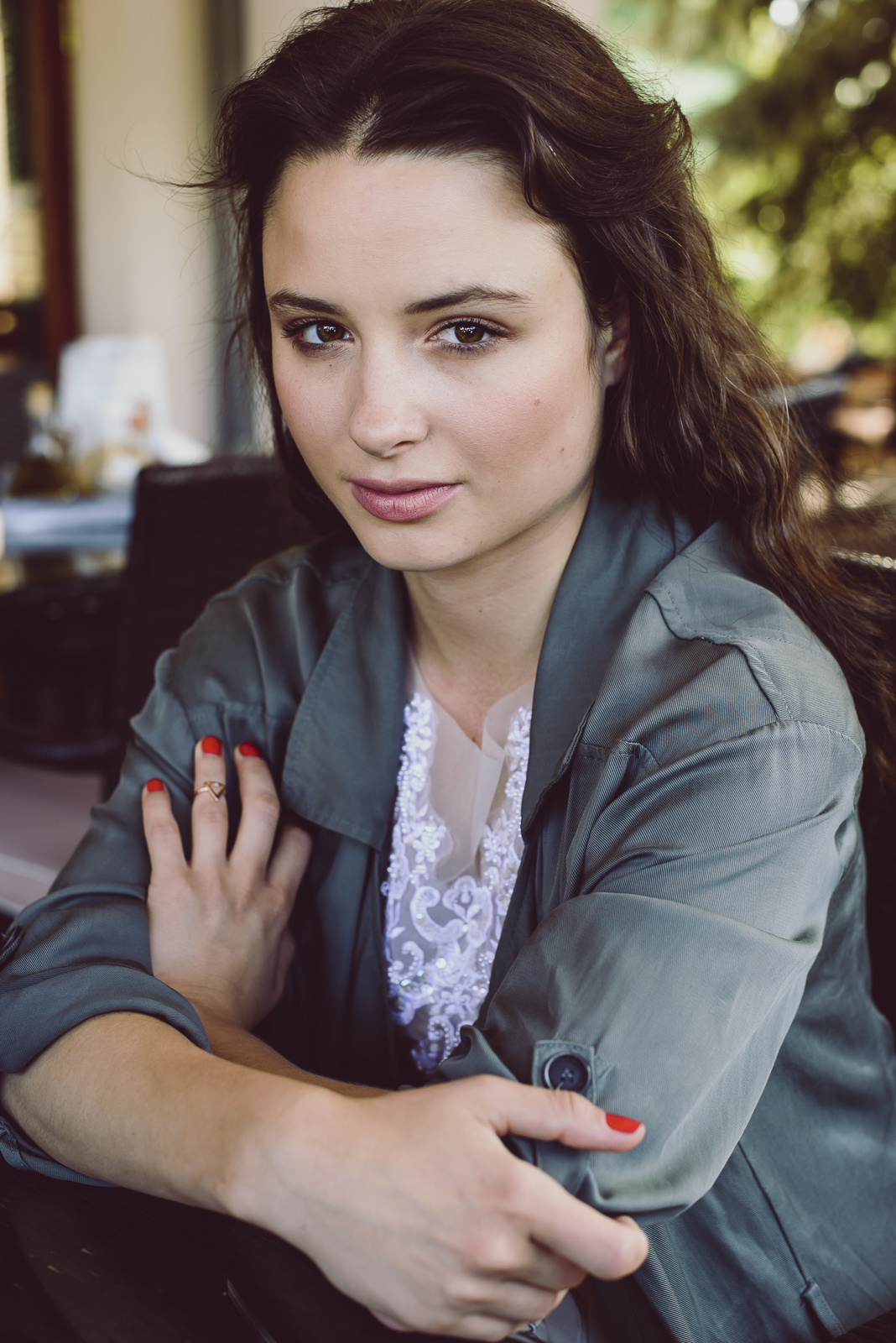
- Born: 22 December 1988 (age 37); Lublin, Poland
- Education: Łódź Film School
- Occupation: Actress
- Years active: 2012–present

Anna Próchniak (born 22 December 1988) is a Polish actress. Initially trained as a dancer, she decided to switch to acting, graduating from the National Film School in Łódź. Próchniak's first major international film role was in The Innocents (Sundance Film Festival 2016) directed by Anne Fontaine. Her credits include Polish Warsaw 44 (2014), Northern Irish Bad Day for the Cut (Sundance Film Festival 2017), Latvian Oleg (Directors’ Fortnight section of the Festival de Cannes 2019) and Baptiste for BBC One (2019). She is a member of the European Film Academy (EFA).

== Selected filmography ==
Year	Title	Role	Notes
2012	Shameless	Irmina	
2014	Obywatel	Kasia	
2014	Warsaw 44	Kama	
2016	The Innocents	Zofia	
2017	Breaking the Limits	Grażyna	
2017	Bad Day for the Cut	Kaja	
2018	Vultures	Sofia	
2019	Baptiste	Natalie Rose	
2019	Oleg	Małgosia	
2022	The Behaviorist	Weronika Dzwonek	
2022	Heart Parade	Magda	
2023	Unmoored	Magdalena	
2024	The Tattooist of Auschwitz	Gita	
2024	Showtrial	Sandra Vodanovic	
2025	Summerwater	Alina Piotrowska	
2026	Gorky Resort	Anna Grabowska	

== Awards ==
Year	Award	Category	Work	Result	Ref.
2014	Gdynia Film Festival	Elle's Rising Star	Warsaw 44	Won	
2016	Zbigniew Cybulski Award	—N/a	Warsaw 44	Nominated	
2025	British Academy Scotland Awards	Actress Film/Television	The Tattooist of Auschwitz	Nominated	
