= Betty Jeffrey =

Australian writer

- Jeffrey in c. 1980s
- Born: Agnes Betty Jeffrey; 14 May 1908; Hobart, Tasmania, Australia
- Died: 13 September 2000 (aged 92); Melbourne, Victoria, Australia
- Burial place: Springvale Botanical Cemetery
- Military career
- Allegiance: Australia
- Branch: Second Australian Imperial Force
- Service years: 1941–1946
- Rank: Lieutenant
- Unit: 2/10th Australian General Hospital
- Conflicts: Second World War
- Awards: Medal of the Order of Australia
- Other work: Writer, White Coolies

Agnes Betty Jeffrey, OAM (14 May 1908 – 13 September 2000) was an Australian nurse, prisoner of war and writer, who wrote about her Second World War nursing experiences in the book White Coolies.

== Second World War ==
Jeffrey was a nurse in the 2/10th Australian General Hospital during the Second World War. She was part of a group of military nurses evacuated from Singapore just before it fell to the Japanese Army. The boat she was on, the SS Vyner Brooke, was bombed from the air and sunk; Jeffrey was shipwrecked. The survivors of her group were taken prisoner of war by the Japanese Imperial Army and interned with civilian women and children in the Dutch East Indies. While interned, Jeffrey joined the Women's Vocal Orchestra of Sumatra. set up by Margaret Dryburgh and Norah Chambers, which did much to uphold camp morale. Vivian Bullwinkel, the only surviving nurse of the Bangka Island massacre, and Wilma Oram were fellow internees with Jeffrey. Jeffrey was freed following the end of the war and returned home on 24 October 1945.

== Charitable activities and writer ==
Jeffrey and Bullwinkel visited every sizeable hospital in Victoria to raise the money that created the Australian Nurses Memorial Centre. She is noted as a founder together with Edith Hughes-Jones, Wilma Oram and Annie Sage. The Melbourne Nurses Memorial Centre opened in 1949 to honour the heroism of nurses.

In 1954 she published her memoir White Coolies, which was serialised as a radio series of the same name the following year. The group of nurses with whom she was interned feature in many of the memoirs and artistic works (novels, radio, TV, film) depicting the life of those held captive by the Japanese.

== Works ==
- White Coolies, Betty Jeffrey, Eden Paperbacks, Sydney, 1954 ISBN 0-207-16107-0
