= The Sound of Hope =

2020 non-fiction book

The Sound of Hope: Music as Solace, Resistance and Salvation During the Holocaust and World War II
- Author: Kellie Brown
- Language: English
- Genre: Non-fiction
- Publisher: McFarland Publishing
- Publication date: 2020

The Sound of Hope: Music as Solace, Resistance and Salvation During the Holocaust and World War II is a 2020 book about music in the Holocaust. It was written by Kellie Brown, Professor of Music at Milligan University and released by McFarland Publishing.

== Description ==
The Sound of Hope is the result of 20 years of research into music's role during the Holocaust and World War II. The book’s premise is that music has an innate ability to speak to and through people in times of great stress and suffering. The book examines places around the world during the 1930s and ‘40s where this suffering happened (Auschwitz, Dachau, Bergen-Belsen, Terezín, the Warsaw Ghetto, Stalag 8A, Sumatra, Leningrad) and presents the stories of musicians who stubbornly clung to music as hope and spiritual resistance. The book also notes that music was not a universal salve, but that music in the hands of the Nazis was used as a cog in their machinery of genocide. and that for some musicians the gift of music was forever stolen from them.

Brown has spoken around the world on this topic including for DONNE Women in Music in London, for the Virginia Holocaust Museum, at King University’s Institute for Faith and Culture, and with internationally renowned violin makers Amnon and Avshalom Weinstein who head up the Violins of Hope Project.

== Reception ==
According to The Washington Post, "Brown shows how for persecuted and imprisoned Jews, music became a way to preserve their humanity and at times even their lives ... Brown has succeeded admirably in bringing together in one volume so much important research". The book is the winner of one of the prestigious Choice Outstanding Academic Title designation for 2021.

== Table of Contents ==
Acknowledgments
Preface
Introduction: The Power of Music

1. The Rise of the Third Reich and Its Cultural Agenda
2. Alma Rosé and the Women’s Orchestra
3. Dr. Herbert Zipper: From Dachau to the World
4. Alice Herz-Sommer and the Music in Terezín
5. Władysław Szpilman and the Warsaw Ghetto
6. Olivier Messiaen: A Composer Confronts the End of Time
7. Dmitri Shostakovich and the Musical Redemption of Leningrad
8. The Vocal Orchestra: Female POWs on Sumatra

Epilogue: Out of the Ashes—The Israel Philharmonic and Violins of Hope
Chapter Notes
Bibliography
Index
