= Allied prisoners of war of Japan =

Treatment of POWs in Japan during WWII

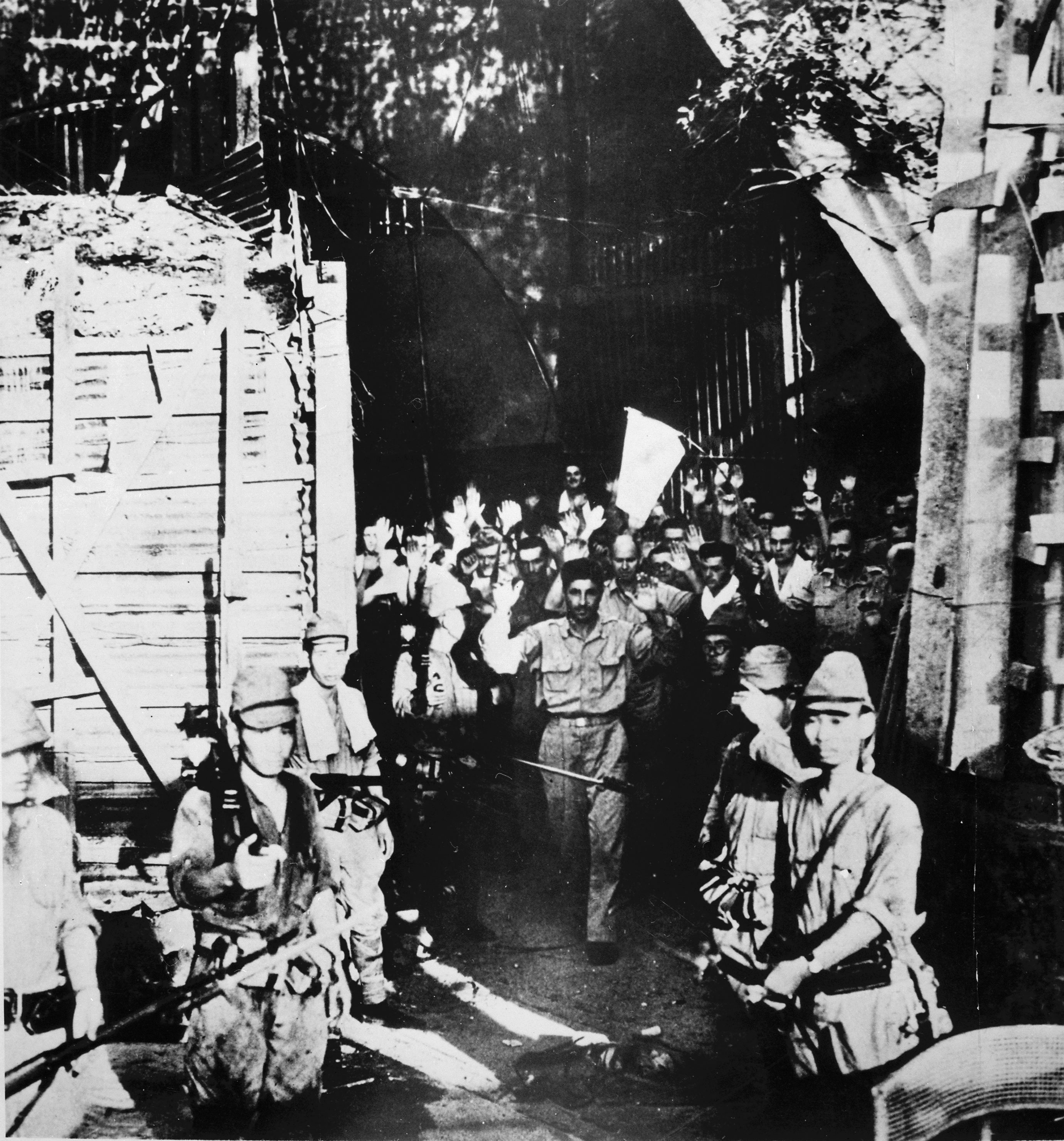
Surrender of US forces at Corregidor, Philippines, May 1942

During the Second World War, Japan took about 140,000 prisoners of war (POWs) from Western Allied countries (also known in the UK as Far East prisoners of war, FEPOW), as well as tens of thousands of Indian and Filipino POWs and several hundred thousands of Chinese POWs. These POWs suffered extreme mistreatment in Japanese captivity, characterized by forced labor, severe malnutrition, disease, physical abuse, and mass executions. The Imperial Japanese Army disregarded international conventions on the humane treatment of POWs, subjecting captives to brutal conditions in prison camps, on forced marches, and aboard transport ships known as "hell ships". Many POWs were forced into labor on large-scale infrastructure projects, including the infamous Burma-Siam Railway, where tens of thousands perished. Japanese forces also conducted biological and chemical experiments on prisoners, most notably through the activities of Unit 731.

Japan had previously ratified the Hague Conventions of 1899 and 1907, which outlined the rights of prisoners of war, but did not ratify the Geneva Convention. The Japanese military's treatment of POWs in World War II was significantly harsher than its treatment of prisoners during the Russo-Japanese War and World War I, reflecting the country's growing militarization, nationalist ideology, and rejection of Western norms. While the Allies generally adhered to the Geneva Convention in their treatment of Japanese POWs, Japan, like other Axis powers and the USSR, did not reciprocate, instead embracing a military culture that viewed surrender as dishonorable and POWs as unworthy of protection.

The death rate for Western Allied POWs in Japanese custody was significantly higher than that in German or Italian hands, reaching nearly 30% for some nationalities. Non-Western POWs, including Chinese, Filipino, and Indian soldiers, often faced even worse conditions, with mass executions of Chinese prisoners being common; the death rate for Chinese POWs has been estimated at least 40% and likely much higher. The mistreatment of POWs became a focal point of post-war war crimes trials, though many of those responsible evaded prosecution. The suffering endured by Allied prisoners left a lasting impact on historical memory, shaping post-war perceptions of Japan's role in World War II. Despite extensive documentation and survivor accounts, the subject remains contentious, with some instances of denial or minimization of related war crimes in Japan.

== Background ==
Japan ratified the Hague Conventions of 1899 and 1907 which contained provisions regarding humane treatment of prisoners of war. Japan did sign the Geneva Convention on Prisoners of War, but did not ratify it.

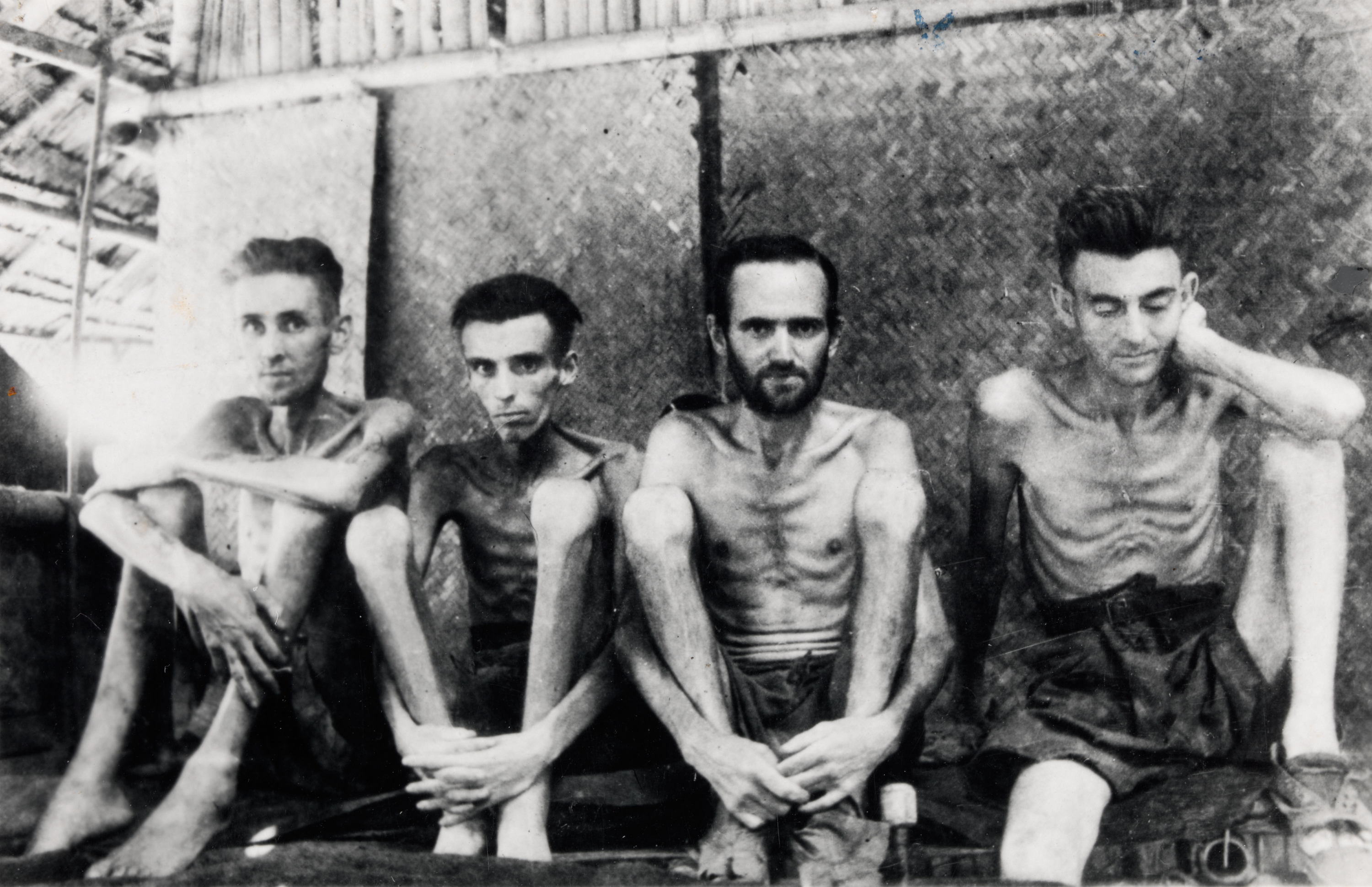
Australian and Dutch soldiers in Japanese captivity (Tarsau, Thailand 1943)

Japanese treatment of POWs in World War II was significantly less humane than their treatment of Russian prisoners it held during the Russo-Japanese War and German prisoners it held during World War I (when it was a member of the Allies/Entente). This has been explained with the changing mindset of the Japanese during that timeframe; in the early 20th century, Japan was more friendly towards Western culture, and strived to respect Western norms to appear "civilized". By the 1930s Japanese nationalism turned the country much more xenophobic; the Western origin of the laws such as the stipulation of the Geneva Convention made them unpopular (after the war, many Japanese accused of crimes against POWs, including mid-ranking soldiers, claimed they had never even heard of the convention), the interpretation of Bushido became much more harsh, and the concept of surrender became much more dishonorable (the Senjinkun military code drafted in 1940 and instituted the next year specifically forbade retreat or surrender). As a result, Japanese saw those who surrendered to them as unworthy of protection; it also reduced the likelihood of their own troops surrendering.

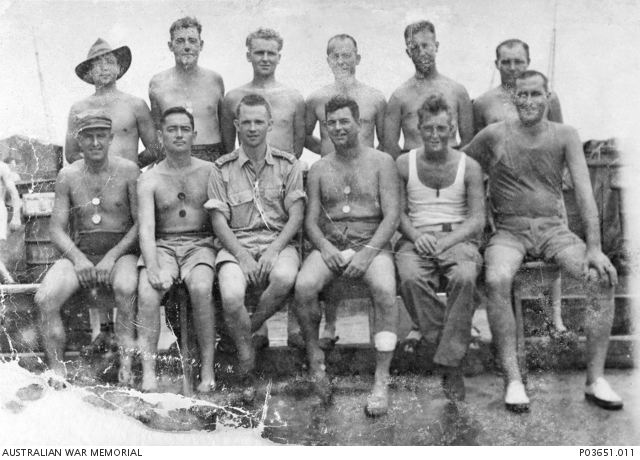
A group portrait of Australian survivors (all but one) from the Sakata prisoner of war camp in Japan

Additionally, by the time it engaged Allied forces, the Japanese military was already radicalized by its war in China (the Second Sino-Japanese War that begun in 1937) and accustomed to drastic actions (most infamously, the Nanjing Massacre, where Chinese civilians and also prisoners of war were murdered). Beatings were also a common way to enforce discipline in the Japanese Imperial Army, and in POW camps, this meant that prisoners of war received the worst beatings of all, partly in the belief that such punishments were merely the proper technique to deal with disobedience. Historians have also attributed war crimes to the lack of supervision and disorganization within the Japanese military, where lack of effective court martial procedures allowed for war crimes to go unpunished and therefore continue. The phenomenon of gekokujō which involves lower-ranking officers overthrowing or assassinating their superiors, also allowed for the proliferation of war crimes because if commanders tried to restrict atrocities that served to relieve boredom or stress of the troops, they would either face mutiny or reassignment.

In 1942, General Tojo Hideki (Japanese war minister and prime minister) stated that Japan would treat POWs according to its own traditions and customs, effectively distancing Japan from the Western traditions and the Geneva conventions, and specifically encouraging the use of POWs for forced labor (which was forbidden by the Geneva Convention). Forced labor provided a significant boost to the Japanese wartime economy. Additionally, in an attempt to deter bombing raids over Japan, Japanese authorities sanctioned the executions of Allied airmen shot down over Japan.

== Conditions ==
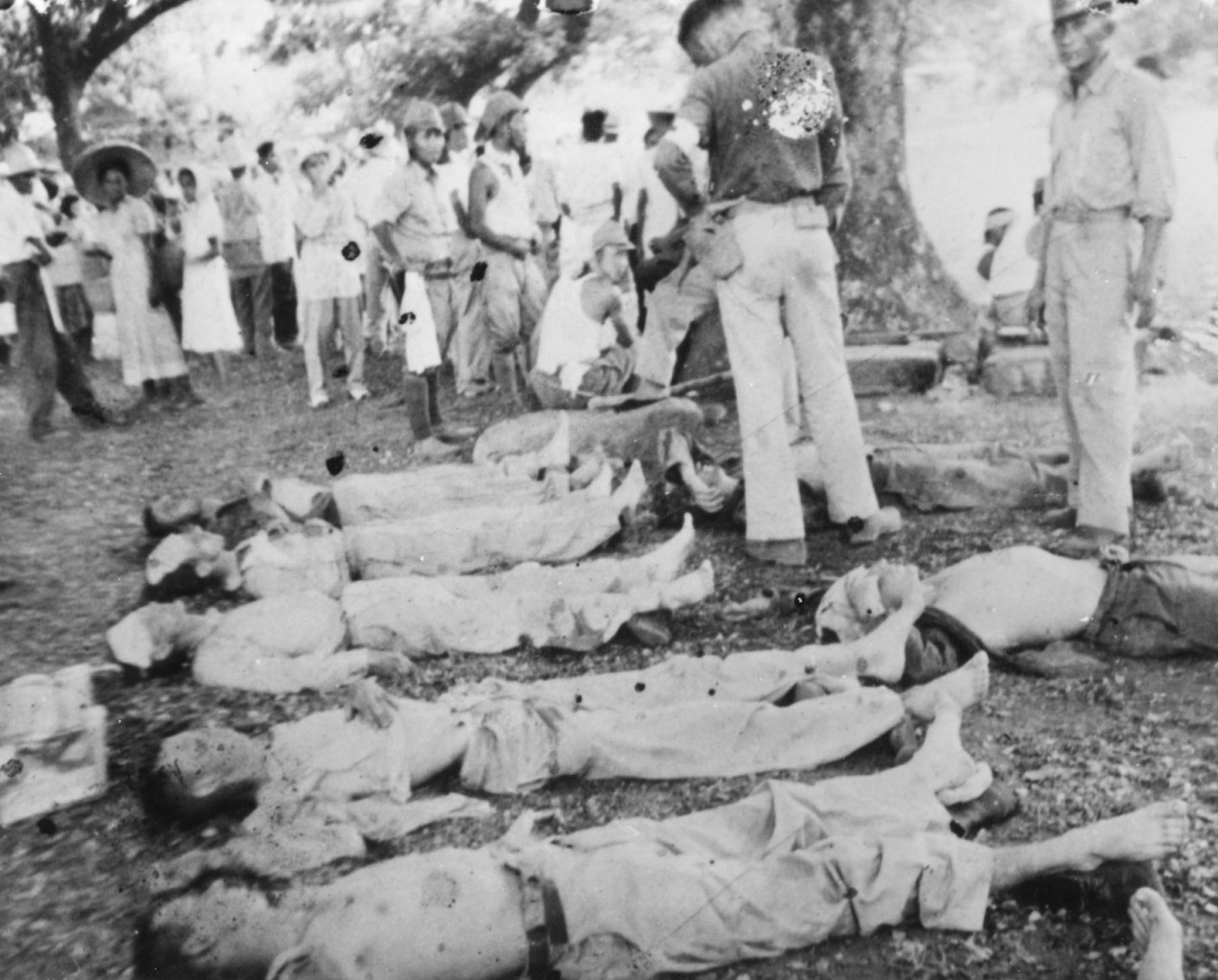
Dead American and Filipino soldiers during the Bataan Death March

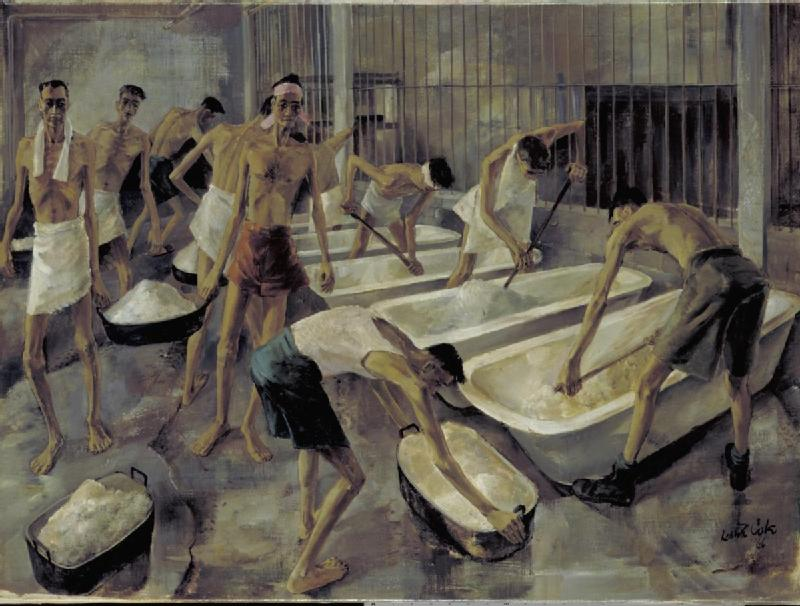
Singapore: The cookhouse, Changi Gaol. British Pow's prepare their main meal of rice. 1946 painting

While traditionally, authorities often moderated their treatment of POWs due to fear of retaliation, in the early stages of the war, the number of POWs held by both sides of the Asian and Pacific theater varied drastically: by the end of 1942 Japanese POWs in Allied hands numbered well under a thousand, while there were over 200,000 British Commonwealth and American prisoners in Japanese hands. Further, Japan refused to publicly acknowledge the fact that any of its soldiers were taken prisoner; in 1943 Japanese Foreign Minister Shigemitsu Mamoru said that "our Army maintains the position that Japanese prisoners of war do not exist."

Australian and other allied captives were held in a notorious prison camp, known as Changi, alongside various other work subcamps in the Burma theatre.

Conditions in Japanese POW camps were harsh; prisoners were forced to work, beaten for minor infractions, starved and denied medical treatment. Those who attempted to escape and were captured were executed or tortured (often by Kempeitai, the Japanese military secret police). The brutality of forced labor is exemplified the case of the Burma-Siam railway, where 16,000 out of 40,000 POWs assigned there as the workforce died. Particularly infamous were the atrocities of Unit 731 which tested biological and chemical weapons on POWs as well as conditions aboard Japanese transport ships known as hell ships (thousands of POWs died during transport on such vessels). Thousands of POWs perished in death marches (ex. Sandakan Death Marches or the Bataan Death March).

Nonetheless, according to Sarah Kovner, "much of the suffering of Allied POWs and internees resulted from Japanese logistical failures and inadequate planning for camps, not prior intent". She concludes that in Japan, with regards to Allied prisoners (except the Chinese) "there was no overarching policy or plan to make POWs suffer, or starve them, or work them to death. There was little policy of any kind. POWs were simply not a priority... [most] camps were run by individual officers, and sometimes NCOs, in far-flung locales" and their commanders were given much autonomy; some prisoners experienced very harsh conditions; others were treated reasonably well. Kovner's claims have not been supported by other researchers, and in fact have been disputed by some critics in the field.

It has also been argued that a significant amount of POW fatalities, perhaps more than half, were the result of friendly fire (sinking of Japanese ships transporting Allied POW, and collateral damage from air raids). One estimate suggested that 19,000 of the Allied POW fatalities in the Pacific theatre came from friendly fire accidents. On the other hand, Japanese rescue efforts during such accidents were lackluster; for example, after the sinking of Japanese hell ship Arisan Maru by an American submarine, Japanese ships secured control of the area, but rescued only Japanese seamen, ignoring the nearly 2,000 POWs, most of whom perished at sea. While some have accused the Japanese Army of purposely exposing POWs to air raids, Kovner notes that the fact that many POW camps were located near the high-priority targets was due to Japanese use of POWs as laborers in those areas; the Japanese administration agreed to relocate some camps away from areas of danger from air raids, but only if it did not affect the use of POWs as laborers.

It was only in August 1945, shortly before the end of the war, as the Japanese were preparing for surrender, that the Japanese government issued instructions calling for better POW treatment.

=== Japanese prisoners of war ===
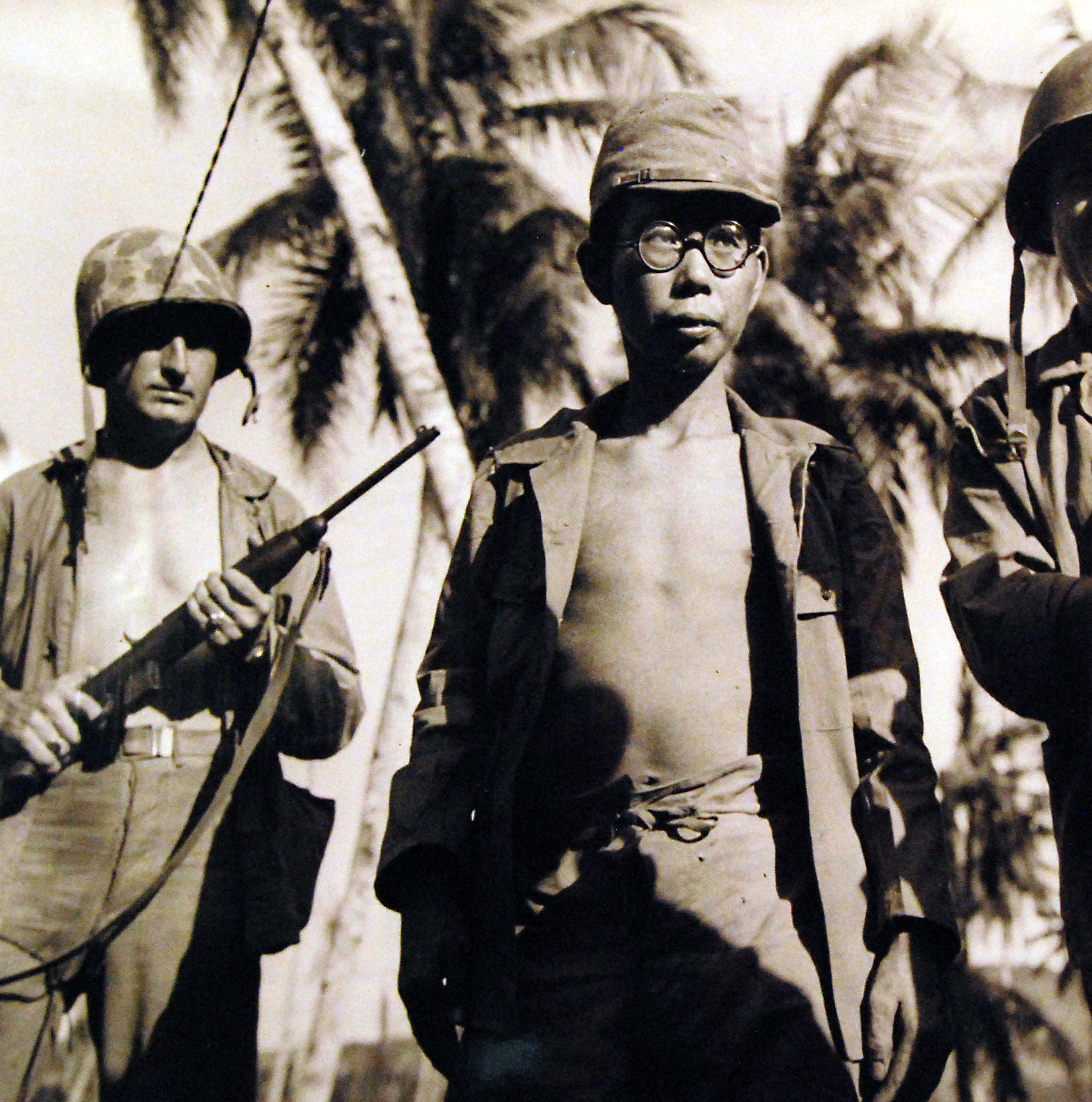
A Japanese soldier that surrendered at Kerama Retto, Ryukyu Islands

Despite Japanese treatment of the Allied prisoners, the Allies respected the international conventions and treated Japanese prisoners in the camps well. However, in some instances, Japanese soldiers were executed after surrendering (see Allied war crimes).

The situation became somewhat reversed at the end of the war, when large numbers of Japanese troops surrendered to the Allies. S. P. MacKenzie noted that "Food shortages, disease, and a certain amount of vindictive callousness among Allied troops" resulted in thousands of deaths among the Japanese POWs; the situation was much worse for the Japanese prisoners of war in the Soviet Union (approximately half of the 600,000 Japanese troops captured by the Soviets remained "unaccounted" decades after the war).

== After the war ==
=== Trials ===
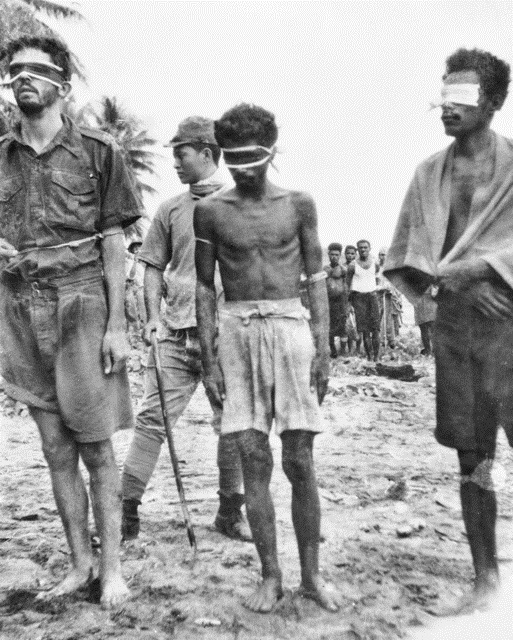
A photograph found on the body of a dead Japanese soldier showing, from left to right, Sergeant Leonard G. Siffleet of "M" Special Unit with Private Pattiwahl and Pte Reharin, Ambonese members of the Netherlands East Indies Forces. The three men were executed by the Japanese.

Japanese accused of war crimes, including atrocities and abuse of prisoners of war, were subject to post-war trials (see International Military Tribunal for the Far East and Yokohama War Crimes Trials for American-led trials; additional trials were held by the British, Australians, Dutch, Chinese and the USSR); most ended by the turn of the decade. Those convicted of crimes against (among others) POWs included high-ranking officers (such as general Tomoyuki Yamashita) to low-ranking prison guards and civilians; most trials were of mid-ranking officers. Many defendants were found guilty and executed or sentenced to life in prison. The trials were criticized for focusing on low or mid-ranking soldiers, as well as non-Japanese (soldiers from the former Japanese colonial empire, such as Koreans and Taiwanese); the latter also faced more discrimination from the Japanese government.

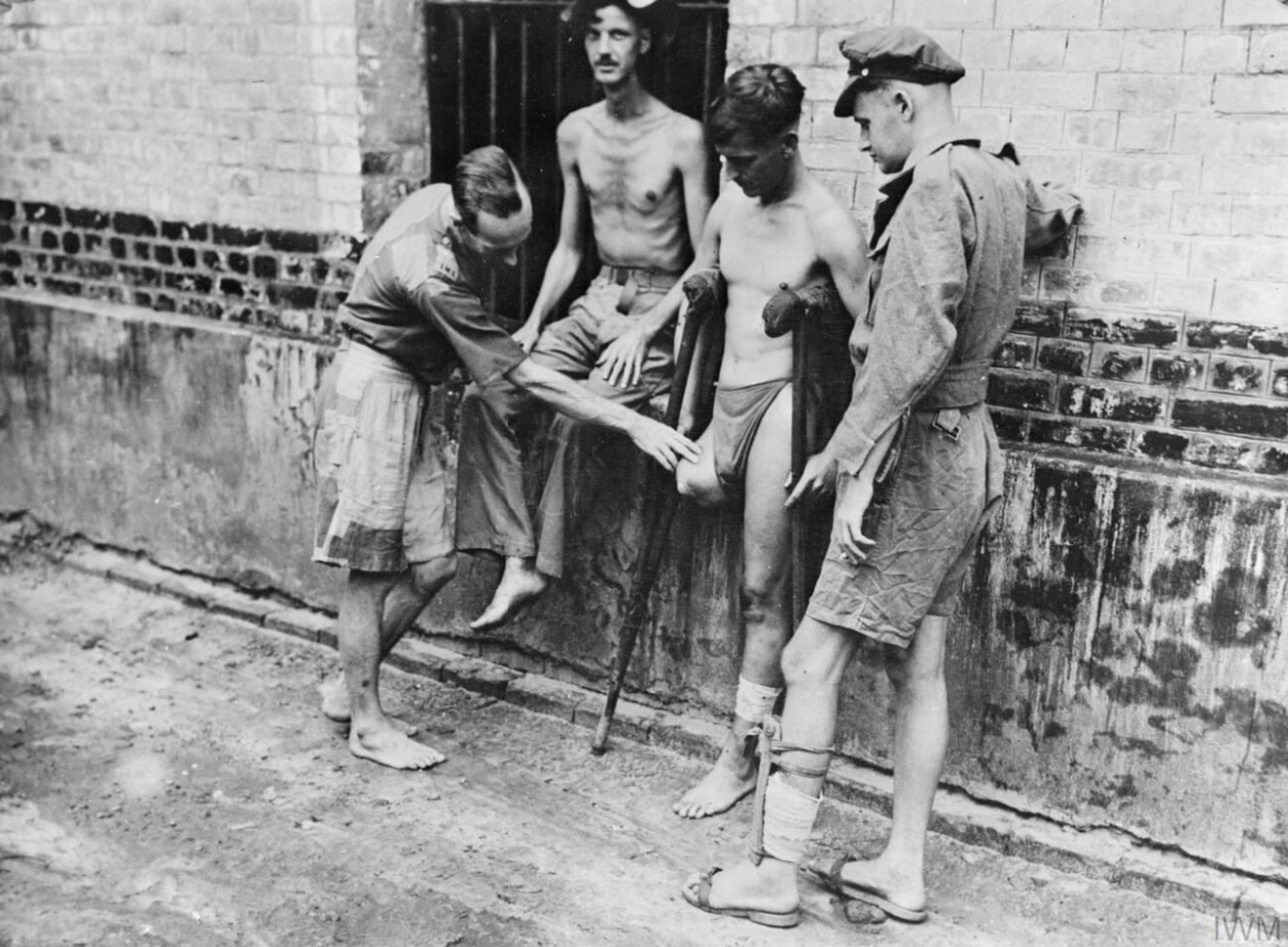
Liberated prisoners of war in Rangoon, Burma, May 1945

In the context of crimes against POWs, an important trial was that of Lieutenant General Tamura Hiroshi, the last director of the Prisoner of War Information Bureau (POWIB) and the Prisoner of War Information Management Office, the Japanese government agency charged with providing information on POWs and administering camps. Kovner notes that it was "how prosecutors put the whole POW camp system on trial", however Tamura himself was not responsible for most of the atrocities, had little actual authority to do either harm or good for the prisoners, and "was prosecuted for being in the wrong place in a bureaucratic hierarchy". Kovner notes that his trial made it "clear that high-level officers at the Ministry of War and officials in the powerful Military Affairs Bureau were the ones who set major policies on POWs" and were responsible for the system that abused POWs to a very high degree. In the end, Tamura was found not guilty on most chargers, and sentenced lightly to just eight years of hard labor. Kovner concludes that in the end, the legal system was unable to pin the blame for the POW mistreatment on any person, small group or organization.

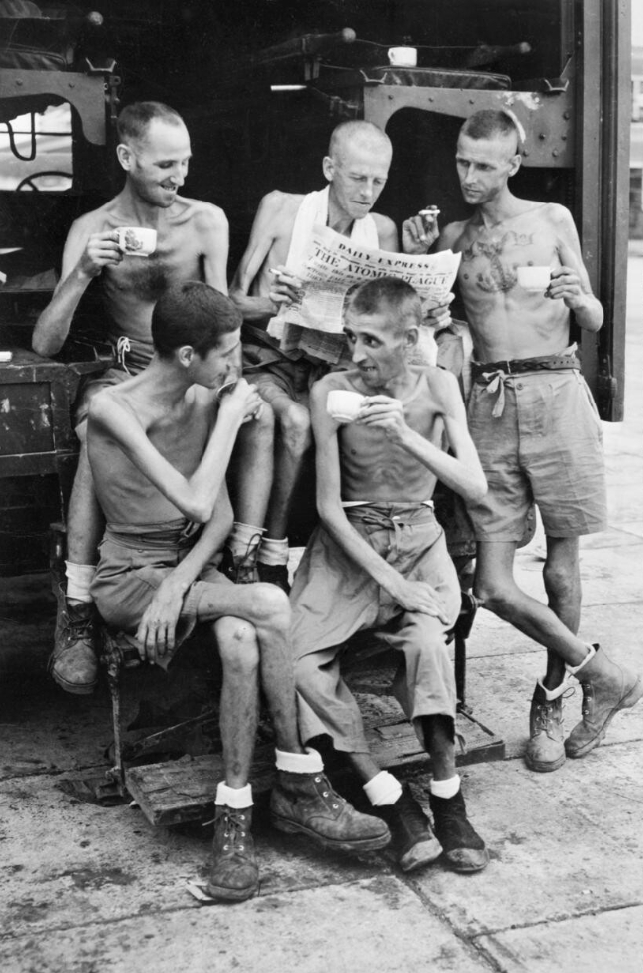
Liberated British prisoners in Singapore after being released from captivity in Sumatra, September–December 1945

The Japanese themselves tried and punished some lower-ranking personnel for abuse of POWs during the war, and on September 20, 1945, established the Investigation Committee on POWs (also known as Central Board of Inquiry on POWs; Furyo kankei chōsa iinkai); their investigation however did not deliver any actionable items and the committee/board was disbanded in 1957.

=== Compensation ===
War reparations in form of compensation (indemnities) for Allied POWs was stipulated by Article 16 of the Treaty of San Francisco of 1952; this was done in the context of Axis powers' use of POWs as forced laborers in contravention of international law. The payments were delayed for several years due to issues related to drawing up the lists of claimants and the collection of the funds; in some cases, payments did not begin until the 1960s. In the year 2000, following a campaign, if not for compensation then at least for recognition of their ordeal, led by the Royal British Legion, the UK government announced a tax-free 'millennium gratuity' of £10,000 for each of the approximately 10,000 surviving prisoners of war of the Japanese.

In the US, some compensation was paid out earlier, following the War Claims Act of 1948. Some claims of insufficient compensation were discussed in courts as late as in the 1990s; however, the Japanese side generally claims that only governments can discuss war reparations, and Japanese courts tend to dismiss claims made by individuals. Additionally, Japanese courts refused to link findings related to war crimes to compensation.

=== Cultural impact and remembrance ===
The harsh treatment of Allied POWs (and to a somewhat lesser degree, civilian internees) by Japan became infamous in the West and remains widely known, invoked in popular works ranging from novels (ex. James Clavell's King Rat from 1962 or John Grisham's The Reckoning from 2018) to video games like Call of Duty: World at War (2008).

Some of the first influential works were penned by former POWs, such as Behind Bamboo (1946) by Rohan Rivett, Slaves of the Samurai (1946) by Wilfrid Kent Hughes,, Slaves of the Sons of Heaven by Roy Whitecross (1951), The Naked Island (1952) by Russell Braddon, The Bridge over the River Kwai (1952) by Pierre Boulle (turned into a movie in 1957) and The Seed and the Sower (1963) by Laurens van der Post (adapted into the 1983 film Merry Christmas Mr Lawrence.). Other notable works mentioned by scholars and critics in this context include novels such as Empire of the Sun by J. G. Ballard (1984, with film adaptation three years later), and biographies such as Unbroken (2010) by Laura Hillenbrand (the story of Louis Zamperini; with a movie adaptation in 2014).

Related are works about civilian, often female, internee, such as films Three Came Home (1950), A Town Like Alice (1956), Women of Valor (1986), and Paradise Road (1997), books White Coolies (1954) by Betty Jeffrey, While History Passed by Jessie Simon (1954), the play The Shoe-Horn Sonata (1995) and the TV series Tenko (1981-1985).

Dutch historian Pieter Lagrou observed that "forced labor carried out in murderous circumstances by Allied soldiers and civilians in Japanese hands", alongside the murder of millions of Soviet POWs by the Germans, "are among the most infamous crimes of the Second World War". It has also led to the enduring creation of the stereotype of the heartless, cruel Japanese. It is however still mostly ignored or glossed over in Japan (see also Nanjing Massacre denial and American cover-up of Japanese war crimes).

== Number of POWs and mortality rate ==
According to Yuki Tanaka, Japanese captured approximately 350,000 POWs; approximately 132,000 of them came from the Western Allied nations (British Commonwealth, Netherlands and the USA). 27% of them (over 35,500) died before the war ended.

The breakdown by nationality is as follows:

- Australia: death rate of 34.1% (approximately 7,500 out of 22,000)
- Canada: death rate of 16.1% (approximately 270 out of 1,700)
- Netherlands: death rate of 22.9% (approximately 8,500 out of 37,000)
- New Zealand: death rate of 25.6% (approximately 30 out of 120)
- United Kingdom: death rate of 24.8% (approximately 12,500 out of 50,000)
- United States: death rate of 32.9% (approximately 7,000 out of 21,000)

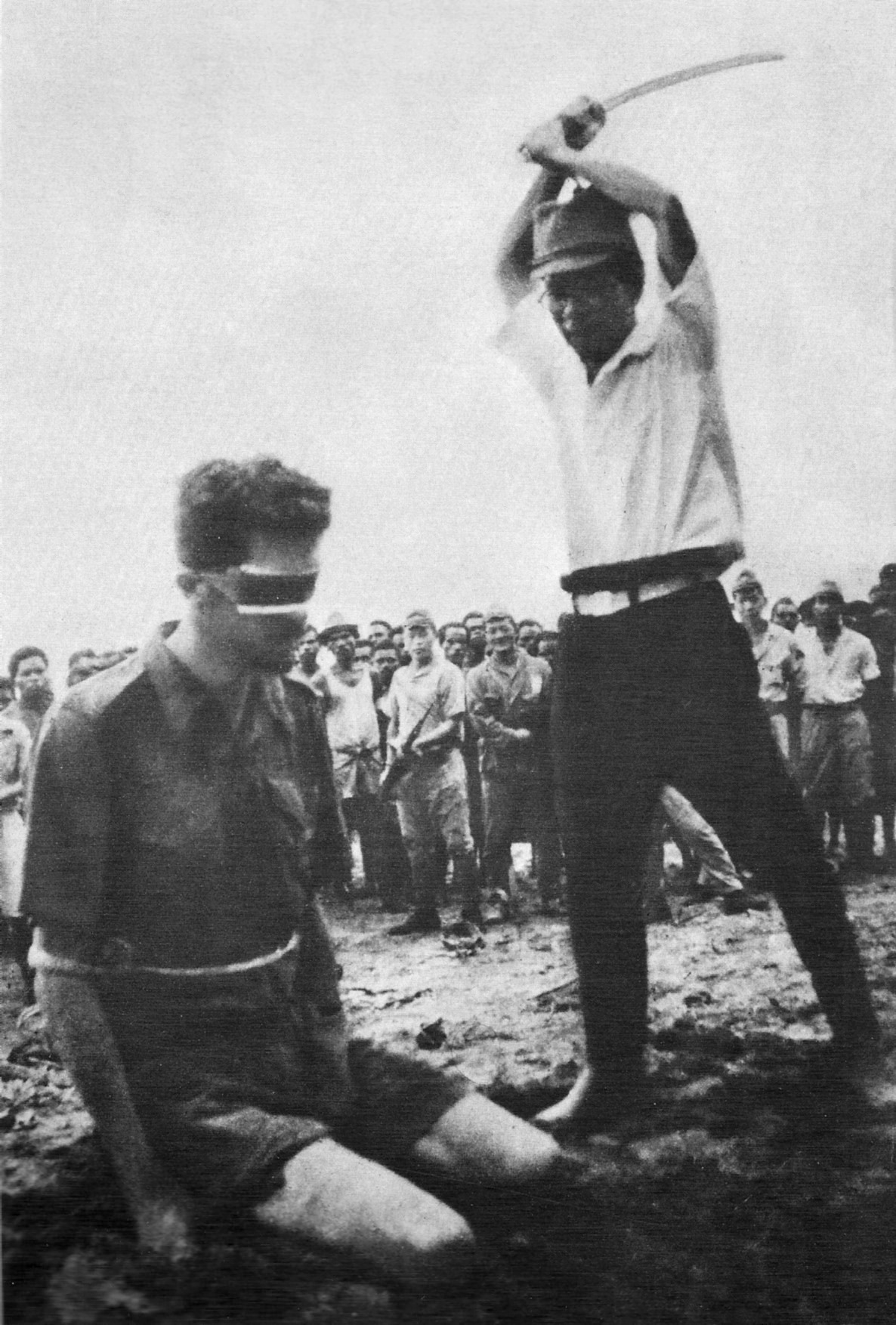
Australian Leonard Siffleet, captured by Japanese in New Guinea, is photographed seconds before his execution by beheading (October 24, 1943)

The above estimates have been described as conservative; higher estimates have been offered (for example for the American troops, as high as 40%). Werner Gruhl's estimate for Western prisoners from the above six countries is slightly higher, at 145,200 POWs, with a fatality rate of 29% (41,600 dead). The fatality rate for Western Allied POWs held by the Japanese as estimated by Gruhl was over seven times higher than the 4% death rate for POWs from the same countries held by the Germans (or six times, if using the lower estimates by Tanaka).

The treatment of non-Western POWs (Chinese, Indian, Filipino) was generally described as worse; many Chinese POWs were simply executed after capture (the lucky ones were conscripted into Japanese forces).

In 2017 Werner Gruhl noted that there is a wide range of estimates regarding Chinese POWs made by different scholars (as late as 2016, some scholars like Christian Gerlach claimed that the total number of Chinese POWs who died in Japanese custody is unknown), Gruhl presented his own estimate that Japanese took about 750,000 Chinese POWs, out of which 267,000 survived the war (the death rate for this estimate would be ~65%). A few years earlier, in 2011, R. J. Rummel noted that the literature on the subject estimates the number of Chinese POWs at half a million, and their fatalities as ranging from 267,000 to as many as a million; proposing a middle-range estimate of 400,000 dead (with, therefore, the lowest possible estimate or the death rate of POWs being at ~80% for the half a million prisoners, less if the number of prisoners is revised upward).

Japan denied POW treatment to Chinese troops as there was no formal declaration of war between Japan and China. The death rate of Chinese prisoners of war was higher than that of Western POWs because—under a directive ratified on 5 August 1937 by Emperor Hirohito—the constraints of international law on treatment of those prisoners was removed. Rummel noted that "few if any camps were set up for Chinese prisoners of war", and that "[most] survivors were worked to death as beasts of burden, or used by the Japanese army for practice or drill"; however Chinese sources suggest that Japan established about 20 such POW camps in occupied Chinese territories. Tens of thousands of Chinese were taken POW every year of the Second Sino-Japanese War; however according to one estimate, only 56 Chinese prisoners of war were released after the surrender of Japan. Another estimates mentions hundreds of POWs released; however Gruhl's and Rummel's estimate suggest there would be many, likely hundred thousands of survivors.

Indian POWs were initially treated reasonably well, in the spirit of Pan-Asianism and in order to entice them to join the collaborationist Indian National Army. Those who refused were treated harshly like other POWs or even harsher. Out of 60,000 Indian POWs captured early in the war, 5,000 died due to poor conditions in Japanese camps.

The number of Filipino POWs in Japanese custody has been estimated as at least 60,000; at least 5,000 died in the Bataan Death March alone. Gruhl estimated that some 20,000 Filipino POWs were murdered or died from conditions in Japanese captivity. According to John C. McManus, as many as 26,000 out of 45,000 were estimated to have died in the Camp O'Donnell, a Japanese POW camp in the Philippines. Their death rate in the POW camps was estimated to be even higher than that of American POWs; they were also initially not considered proper POWs.

Following Italian surrender in 1943, a small number of Italian sailors was taken into custody by the Japanese; some were enlisted in the Japanese navy and others interned.

Japan also held 15,000 French POWs, after it took over French Indochina in March 1945.

Japan also held a number of Soviet prisoners of war. 87 were released during a prisoner exchange following the 1939 border clashes Khalkhin Gol (at that point, however, USSR was not a WWII participant).

In addition to POWs, Japan also held a number of civilian internees; for example, 14,000 American civilians.

== See also ==
- Far East prisoners of war
- Internment of Japanese Americans
- Japanese prisoners of war in World War II
- Japanese prisoners of war in the Soviet Union
- Japanese Surrendered Personnel
- Japanese war crimes
- Hell ships
- List of Japanese-run internment camps during World War II
- Prisoners of war in World War II
