= White Coolies =

1954 memoir by Betty Jeffrey

- Author: Betty Jeffrey
- Language: English
- Subject: World War Two
- Genre: memoir
- Publisher: Angus & Robertson
- Publication date: 1954
- Publication place: Australia

White Coolies is a 1954 memoir by Australian nurse Betty Jeffrey about her experiences in World War Two. This included surviving the sinking of the Vyner Brook, escaping a massacre, and being in a camp on Sumatra.

== Background ==
It was based on a diary she secretly kept in the camp.

== Reception ==
The book was a best seller, selling more than 70,000 copies in Australia.

The book was adapted into a hugely successful radio serial.

== Radio serial ==
White Coolies
- Running time: 30 mins
- Country of origin: Australia
- Language: English
- Starring: Ruth Cracknell; June Salter; Margaret Christensen; Madge Ryan; Joan Lander; Diana Perryman
- Written by: Gwen Friend
- Produced by: Fifi Banvard
- Original release: 9 October 1955 – 1956
- No. of series: 1
- No. of episodes: 52

The book was adapted into a 1955 radio serial.

It was one of the most acclaimed Australian radio serials of all time. There was a mostly female cast and a female writer and director, which was rare for the time.

=== Cast ===
- Ruth Cracknell as Betty Jeffrey
- June Salter as Iole Harper
- Margaret Christensen as Sister Delforce
- Madge Ryan as Matron Paschke
- Joan Lander as Sister Woodbridge
- Diana Perryman
