= Timeline of nursing history in Australia and New Zealand =

The timeline of nursing history in Australia and New Zealand stretches from the 19th century to the present.

== 18th–19th century ==
=== 1780s ===
- 1788 – Tent hospital set up on Dawes Point, Sydney after arrival of First Fleet.
- 1789 – Arabanoo nurses four indigenous victims of smallpox epidemic but dies of the disease.

=== 1810s ===
- 1811 – Castle Hill Lunatic Asylum established.
- 1816 – Opening of the "Rum Hospital", later Sydney Hospital. Convict men and women undertook the nursing.

=== 1820 ===
- 1821 – Benevolent Asylum opened to care for destitute aged and others.

=== 1830s ===
- 1838 – The first trained nurses arrive in Sydney, five Irish Sisters of Charity.

=== 1840s ===
- 1840 – Settlement of New Zealand as a colony and the establishment of state hospitals.
- 1841 – People considered to be mentally ill were considered criminals. The first case of insanity in New Zealand's society was recorded in 1841.
- 1847 – Wellington Hospital was established, The first New Zealand Hospital.
- 1848 – The Yarra Bend Asylum was opened so that those mentally ill could be moved out of gaol. This Asylum was later known as Melbourne.

=== 1850s ===
- 1852 – Ex-convict Bathsheba Ghost appointed Matron of Sydney Infirmary.
- 1854 – The first lunatic asylum was built, in Wellington, New Zealand.
- 1857 – Sisters of Charity under Mother Mary Baptist De Lacy established St Vincent's Hospital, Sydney.
- 1860–1883 – Approximately 16,378 single women emigrated to New Zealand; 582 identified their occupation as a nurse, monthly nurse, sick nurse, trained nurse, nurse girl, midwife, hospital nurse or professional nurse.
- 1868 – Lucy Osburn and her four Nightingale nurses arrived at Sydney Infirmary (to become Sydney Hospital). They soon start the first nursing school.

=== 1870s ===
- 1870 – New Zealand had 37 hospitals as a result of the population increase of the gold rush.
- 1879 – Sister Mary Jane West Armfield serves in Zulu War.

=== 1880s ===
- 1884 – Little Sisters of the Poor begin aged care in Melbourne.
- 1885 – following the Hospital and Charitable Aids Act conditions improved.

=== 1890s ===
- 1892 – Suzanne Aubert founds Daughters of Our Lady of Compassion in Jerusalem, New Zealand.
- 1896 – Lady Lamington Nurses' Home, Brisbane, begun.
- 1899 – Australasian Trained Nurses' Association was founded in New South Wales.
- 1899–1902 – Nurses led by Nellie Gould serve in the Boer War, serving as private citizens or with the British nursing forces. Prejudice meant that although hundreds of female nurses applied there was conflict with those already in the military. Few however did serve in South Africa, including around 33 New Zealand nurses.

== 20th century ==
=== 1900s ===
- 1900 – Death of Boer War nurse Fanny Hines in Bulawayo.
- c.1900 – The Private Hospital, Wakefield Street in Adelaide becomes the first training hospital for nurses in the colony of South Australia, under Alice Tibbits (1854–1932).
- 1901 – New Zealand is the first country to regulate nurses nationally, with adoption of the Nurses Registration Act

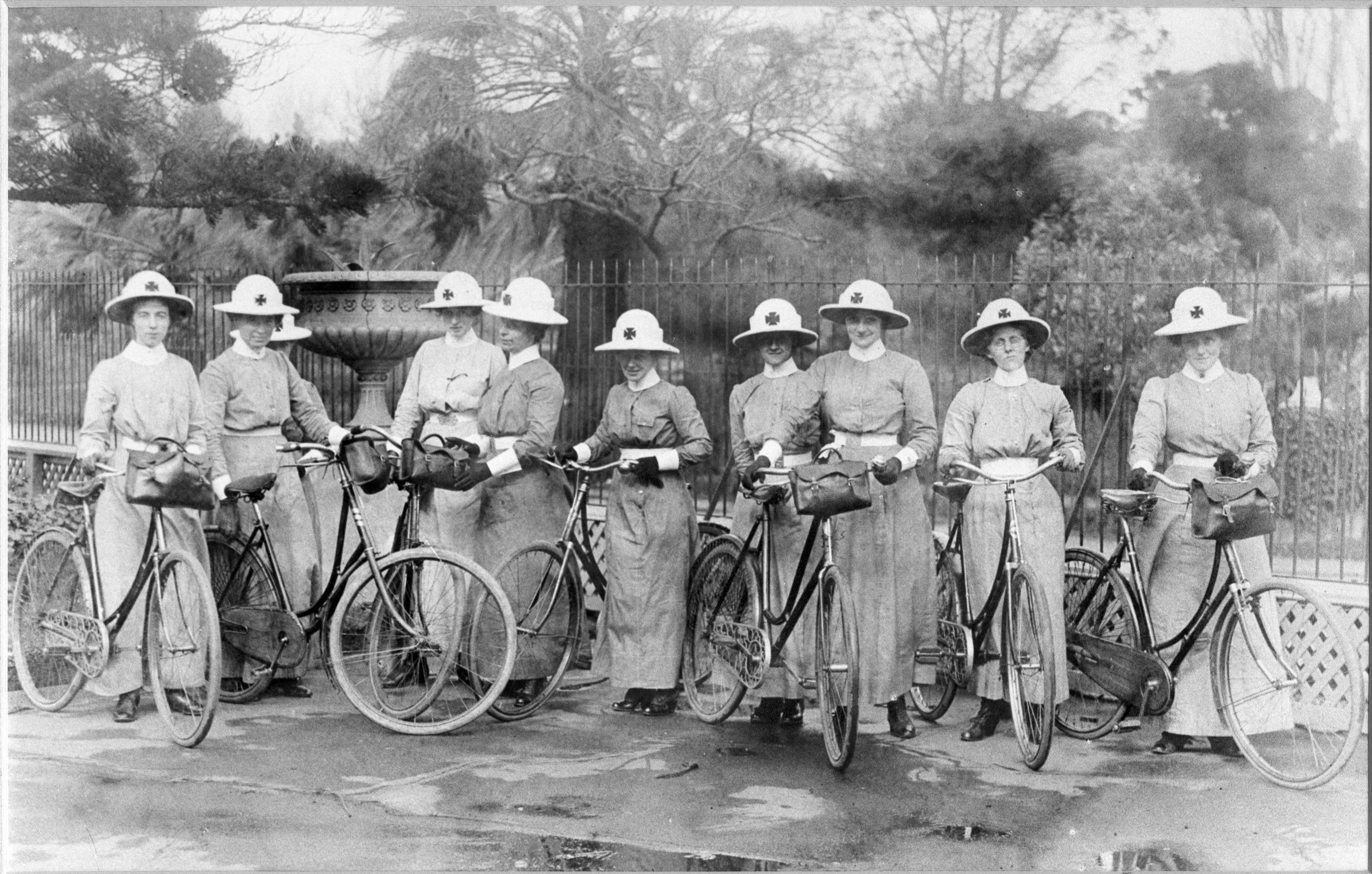
District nurses in Melbourne, 1904

- 1901 – Royal Victorian Trained Nurses' Association is formed.
- 1902 – Ellen Dougherty of New Zealand becomes the first registered nurse in the world on 10 February.
- 1902 – Australian Army Nursing Service formed.
- 1904 – Queen's Memorial Infectious Diseases Hospital opened in Fairfield, initially as a 'fever' hospital.
- 1906 – Sisters of Mercy establish Mater Misericordiae Hospital, North Sydney.
- 1907 – Indigenous woman May Yarrowick receives nursing certificate in Sydney.
- 1907 – First of Karitane hospitals for training neonatal nurses opened in Dunedin.
- 1908 – Ākenehi Hei, of the Whakatohea and Whanau-a-Apanui tribes, was the first Maori registered nurse in New Zealand.
- 1908 – Kai Tiaki, the first New Zealand nursing journal, is published.
- 1909 – A new role called 'backblocks' nursing was introduced to New Zealand providing services to rural parts of the country
- 1909 – Waterfall State Sanatorium opened.

=== 1910s ===
- 1910 – Ākenehi Hei, the first qualified Maori nurse in New Zealand, dies on 28 November 1910 after contracting typhoid from family members she was nursing.
- 1911 – New South Wales Bush Nursing Association founded.
- 1912 - Evelyn Marsden survives sinking of Titanic.
- 1913 – Eileen O'Connor and Fr Ted McGrath found Our Lady's Nurses for the Poor to look after the Sydney sick poor at home.
- 1914 – First baby health centre established at Alexandria NSW.
- 1914–1918 – Australian and New Zealand nurses serve outside their countries in World War I. 29 Australian nurses die in WWI.

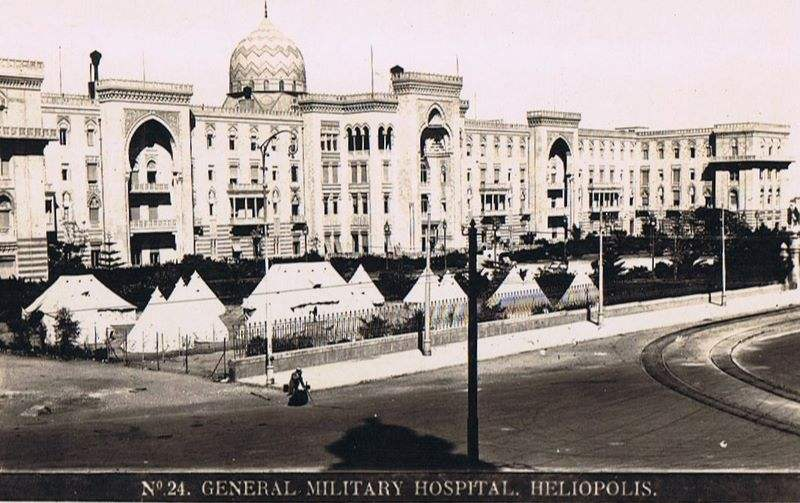
General Military Hospital, Heliopolis

- 1914 – Alice Gordon Elliott and Sister Janet Radcliffe are the first nurses to sail abroad to assist in World War One.
- 1914 – Australian nurses in England join Australian Voluntary Hospital in northern France.
- 1915 – Wounded from Gallipoli treated on Lemnos and at converted Heliopolis Palace Hotel, Cairo; death of Louisa Bicknell.
- 1915 – The New Zealand Army Nursing Service set up in 1915, largely at the urging of Hester Maclean (1863–1932).
- 1915 – 10 New Zealand nurses killed when SS Marquette torpedoed in Aegean Sea.
- 1916 – Group of 20 Bluebirds depart Sydney for Western Front.

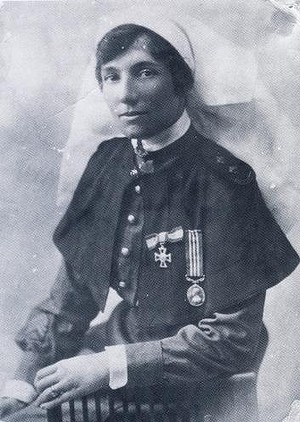
Alice Ross-King MM c. 1919

- 1916 – Narrelle Hobbes serves on Mesopotamian front.
- 1916 – Hundreds of Australian Army nurses sent to work in India.
- 1917 – Alice Ross-King and three other nurses awarded Military Medal for bravery in hospital bombing, Flanders.
- 1918 – Death of Edith Blake when hospital ship Glenart Castle torpedoed.
- 1919 – Deaths of a number of nurses in the Spanish flu influenza pandemic.
- 1919 – Victorian Government refuses Archbishop Mannix's offer of nuns to nurse Spanish Flu patients.
- 1919 – Opening of Westwood Sanatorium for miner's phthisis and tuberculosis.

=== 1920s ===
- 1920 – South Australia the first state to set up a Nurses Registration Board.
- 1925 – New Zealand attempts to have a degree nursing programme available at the University of Otago.

=== 1930s ===
- 1930 – Cecily Maude O'Connell founds Grey Sisters to look after poor mothers and children in Melbourne.
- 1936 – Sr Mary Gertrude establishes Derby Leprosarium.
- 1937 – Four Australian nurses serve in Spanish Civil War, and three from New Zealand including René Shadbolt.
- 1938 – The New Zealand Social Security Act of 1938 marks the introduction of a comprehensive health system that mandated the provision of free care for all.
- 1939 – Registering of nursing aides commenced in New Zealand
- 1939 – St Anne's Guild of Catholic Nurses formed.
- 1939 – Elouera House nurses home opened in Wollongong.
- 1939–1945 – Australian and New Zealand nurses serve outside their countries in World War II.

=== 1940s ===
- 1940 – Royal Australian Air Force Nursing Service formed.
- 1942 – Banka Island massacre: Twenty-one Australian nurses, survivors of a bombed and sunken ship, are executed by bayonet or machine gun by Imperial Japanese Army soldiers on 16 February, with sole survivor Vivian Bullwinkel.

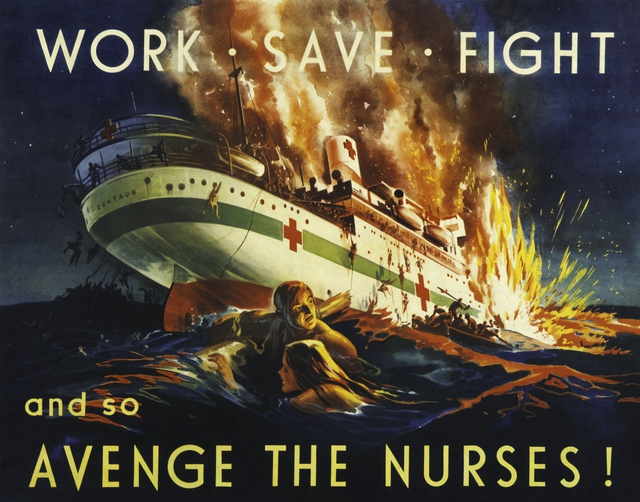
Remembering the Centaur sinking

- 1942 – Royal Australian Naval Nursing Service formed.
- 1943 – 11 Army nurses killed when hospital ship Centaur torpedoed off Queensland.
- 1944–45 – Medical Air Evacuation Transport Units take wounded from New Guinea.
- 1945 – Native Nurses Training Scheme begun in some Queensland aboriginal settlements.
- 1945 – Muriel Knox Doherty works as matron at Bergen-Belsen concentration camp after its liberation.
- 1946 – Rosalind Russell stars in biographical film Sister Kenny, portraying Elizabeth Kenny's treatment for polio.
- 1949 – Formation of the NSW College of Nursing.
- 1949 – Formation of College of Nursing, Australia

=== 1950s ===
- 1950–1953 – 153 Australian nurses serve in Korean War.

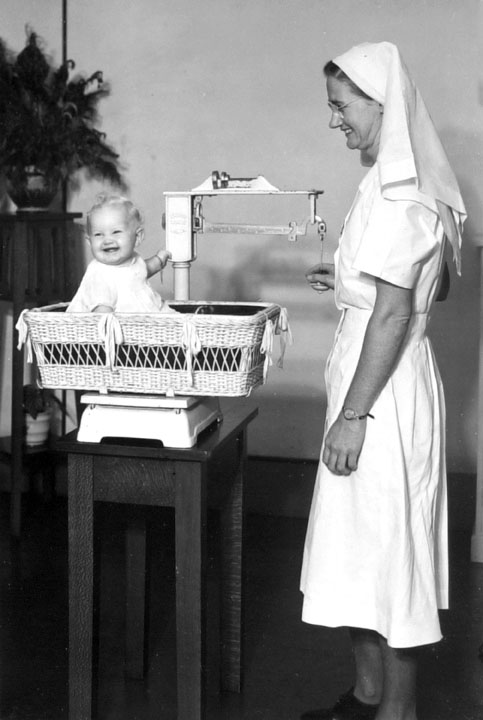
Mother and Child Welfare Service, Queensland, 1950

- 1950 – Publication of Scarlet Pillows: An Australian nurse's tales of long ago by Mrs Arthur H. Garnsey (Ann Stafford Bird).
- 1954 – Betty Jeffrey's memoir White Coolies describes her captivity in Sumatra in World War II.
- 1958 – Completion of Napier Waller's stained glass windows in Hall of Memory, Australian War Memorial, including one of nurse symbolising "Devotion".

=== 1960s ===
- 1960 – Elizabeth Burchill's Innamincka describes remote area nursing of the 1930s.
- 1963 – Sister Mary Bernice Elphick begins long term as head of St Vincent's Hospital, Sydney.
- 1967 – New Zealand nursing undergo changes from being hospital-based apprenticeships to tertiary education institutions.
- 1967 – Nurse and aviator Robin Miller begins outback flights delivering polio vaccine in northern Western Australia.
- 1967–1971 – 43 Australian army nurses serve in Vietnam War.

=== 1970s ===
- 1971 – The Carpenter Report was released; a review released by New Zealand centred around the nursing education system, the report advocated training nurses in an educational environment. The government however decided that polytechs, not universities, were more appropriate for this; however the consequences of this were that nurses were only diploma level not degree level.
- 1971 – Australian Nurses' Journal (later Australian Nursing Journal, later Australian Nursing and Midwifery Journal) founded.
- 1973 – Christchurch and Wellington Polytechnics offer diploma-level nursing education; Massey and Victoria Universities (Wellington) start their post-registration bachelor's degrees.
- 1975 – First nursing diploma programme in Australia in a College of Advanced Education (CAE) in Melbourne, followed quickly by programs in New South Wales, South Australia and Western Australia.
- 1975 – First National Mental HealthNurses Congress.

=== 1980s ===
- 1980 – The Roper, Logan and Tierney model of nursing, based upon the activities of daily living, is published.
- 1982 – Australian Nursing Assessment Council established to regulate registration of foreign-trained nurses.
- 1983 – The importance of human rights in nursing is made explicit in a statement adopted by the International Council of Nurses.
- 1983 – Former nurse Elizabeth Jolley's novel Mr Scobie's Riddle portrays life in a nursing home.
- 1988 – Anne Casey develops her child-centred nursing model while working as a paediatric oncology nurse in London.
- 1988 – Australian Critical Care journal founded.
- 1989 – Nurses' Health Study 2 begins.

=== 1990s ===
- 1990 – Last student graduated from New Zealand hospital program.
- 1990 – Former nurse Lowitja O'Donoghue becomes inaugural chair of the Aboriginal and Torres Strait Islander Commission.
- 1992 – "Cultural safety" was made a requirement for nursing and midwifery education programs by the Nursing Council of New Zealand. Cultural safety allows effective nursing of patients and/or family members of those of another culture by a nurse who has reflected on one's own cultural identity and understands the impact of differing cultures in nursing practice and patient care.
- 1992 – The Australian and New Zealand national governments signed a Mutual Recognition Agreement.
- 1992 – Jan Bassett's Guns and Brooches surveys the history of Australian Army nursing.
- 1996 – The Flight Nurse Association was created by the New Zealand Nurses Organisation (NZNO) to recognise the need of training and education of the same standards throughout New Zealand.
- 1997 – Movie Paradise Road based on the testimony of Betty Jeffrey on WWII captivity in Sumatra.
- 1997 – Congress of Aboriginal and Torres Strait Islander Nurses and Midwives formed.

== 21st century ==
=== 2000s ===
- 2000 – Review of undergraduate nursing education by New Zealand Nursing Council
- 2000 – Air Force nurses deployed with Australian forces in Timor.
- 2002 – Deborah Harris, New Zealand's first Nurse Practitioner.
- 2003 – Anna Rogers' While You're Away tells the story of New Zealand nurses at war.
- 2004 – The Health Practitioners Competence Assurance (2003) Act comes into full power on 18 September, in New Zealand, these cover the requirements for nurses to have current competences relating to their scope of practice.
- 2005 – The Nursing Council of New Zealand published a comprehensive guideline on cultural safety in nursing education and practice.
- 2006 – SBS TV drama series RAN Remote Area Nurse portrays nursing in Torres Strait.
- 2008 – Peter Rees' The Other ANZACs tells the story of World War I nurses.

=== 2010s ===
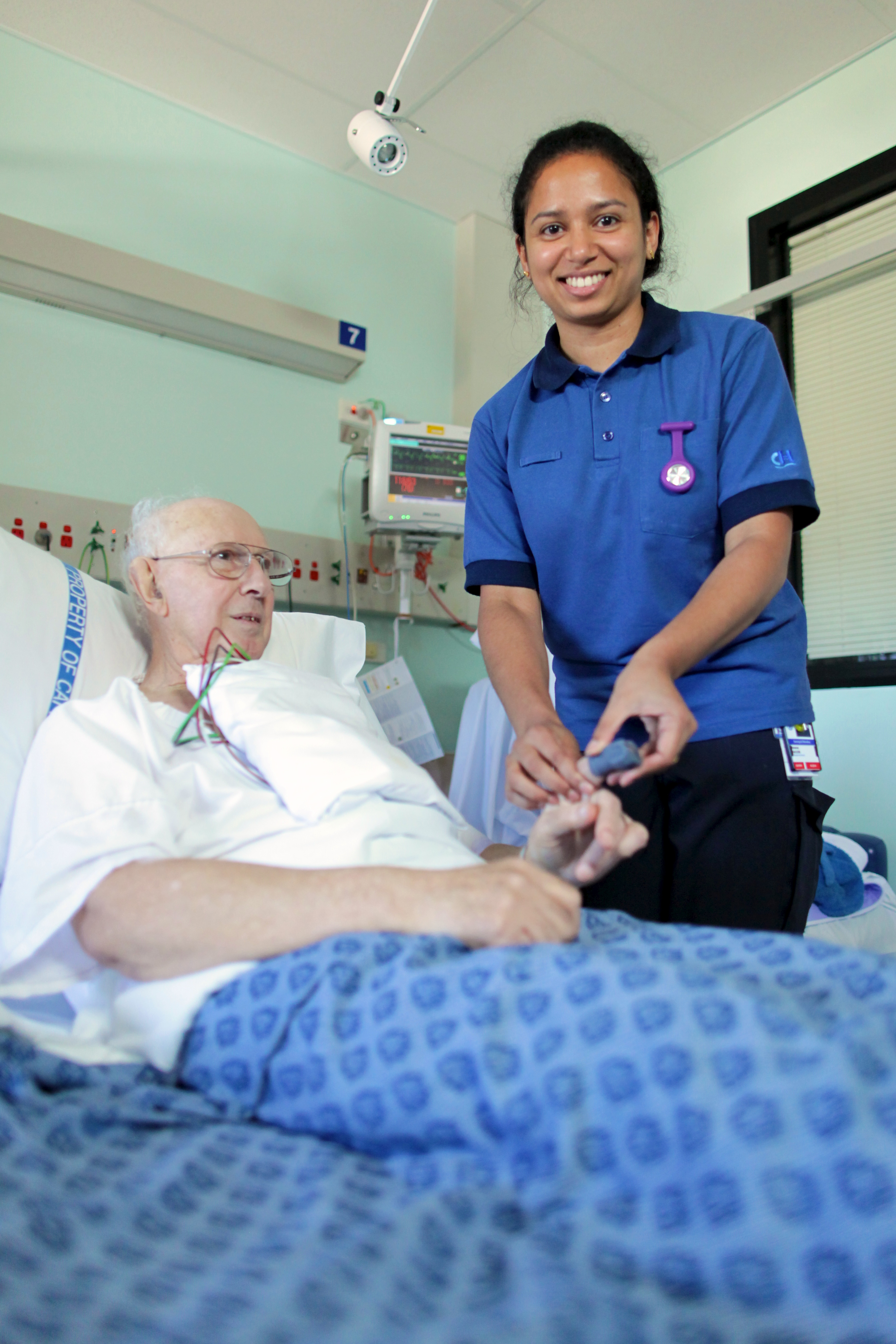
Canberra Hospital, 2011

- 2010 – A national registration for all nurses and midwives comes into force in Australia in July 2010.
- 2010 – Nurses' Health Study 3 begins enrolling: Female RNs, LPNs, and nursing students 20–46 are encouraged to join this long-term women's health study. Study remains open until 100,000 nurses are enrolled.
- 2010 – Sisters of War telemovie portrays Australian nurses captured in Rabaul in World War II.
- 2011 – 11 residents die in Quakers Hill Nursing Home fire, deliberately lit by nurse.
- 2012 – Australian College of Nursing formed from amalgamation of earlier bodies.
- 2013 – Annabelle Brayley's Bush Nurses tells the story of remote nursing.
- 2014 – TV drama series ANZAC Girls portrays nurses in World War I.
- 2014 – Thea Hayes' An Outback Nurse describes nursing at Wave Hill, Northern Territory in the 1960s.
- 2015 – Publication of Ruth Rae's 4-volume History of Australian Nurses in the First World War.
- 2016 – Murder of remote area nurse Gayle Woodford in APY Lands.

=== 2020s ===
- 2020 – Nurses in front line of response to COVID-19 pandemic.
- 2021 – Nurses help provide mass COVID-19 vaccinations.

== Bibliography ==
- Allan, V. (2004). A new way of living: the history of the Spinal Injuries Unit in Christchurch. The Guttmann Story (pp. 7). Christchurch, New Zealand: Canterbury District Health Board.
- Bullough, Vern L. and Bullough, Bonnie. The Care of the Sick: The Emergence of Modern Nursing (1978).
- Craven, Ruth F., & Hirnle, Constance J. (2007). Fundamentals of nursing: Human health and function (5th ed). Philadelphia, PA: Lippincott Williams & Wilkins.
- Craven, R F., & Hirnle, C J. (2009) Fundamentals of nursing: Human health and function (6th ed). Philadelphia, PA: Lippincott Williams & Wilkins.
- Crisp, J., & Taylor, C. (2009). Potter & Perry's fundamental of nursing (3rd ed.). Chatswood, Australia : Elsevier Australia.
- Crisp, J., Taylor, C., Douglas, C., Rebeiro, G. (2013). Potter & Perry's fundamentals of nursing (4th ed.). Elsevier Australia.
- Dingwall, Robert, Anne Marie Rafferty, Charles Webster. An Introduction to the Social History of Nursing (Routledge, 1988)
- Donahue, M. Patricia. Nursing, The Finest Art: An Illustrated History (3rd ed. 2010), includes over 400 illustrations; 416pp
- Harris, Kirsty. Girls in Grey: Surveying Australian Military Nurses in World War I History Compass (Jan 2013) 11#1 PP 14–23, online free, with detailed bibliography
- Papps, E., (2002). Nursing in New Zealand. Auckland, New Zealand: Pearson Education New Zealand.
- Papps, E., & Ramsden, I. (1996). International Journal for Quality Healthcare. Vol 8, No 5, pp. 491–497
- Wood, Pamela J.; Foureur, Maralyn (2004). "Exploring the maternity archive of the St Helens Hospital, Wellington, New Zealand, 1907–22". New Directions in the History of Nursing: International Perspectives. Routledge. pp. 179–93. Archived from the original on 5 January 2009 – via Questia.
