= Roianne West =

Professor Roianne West
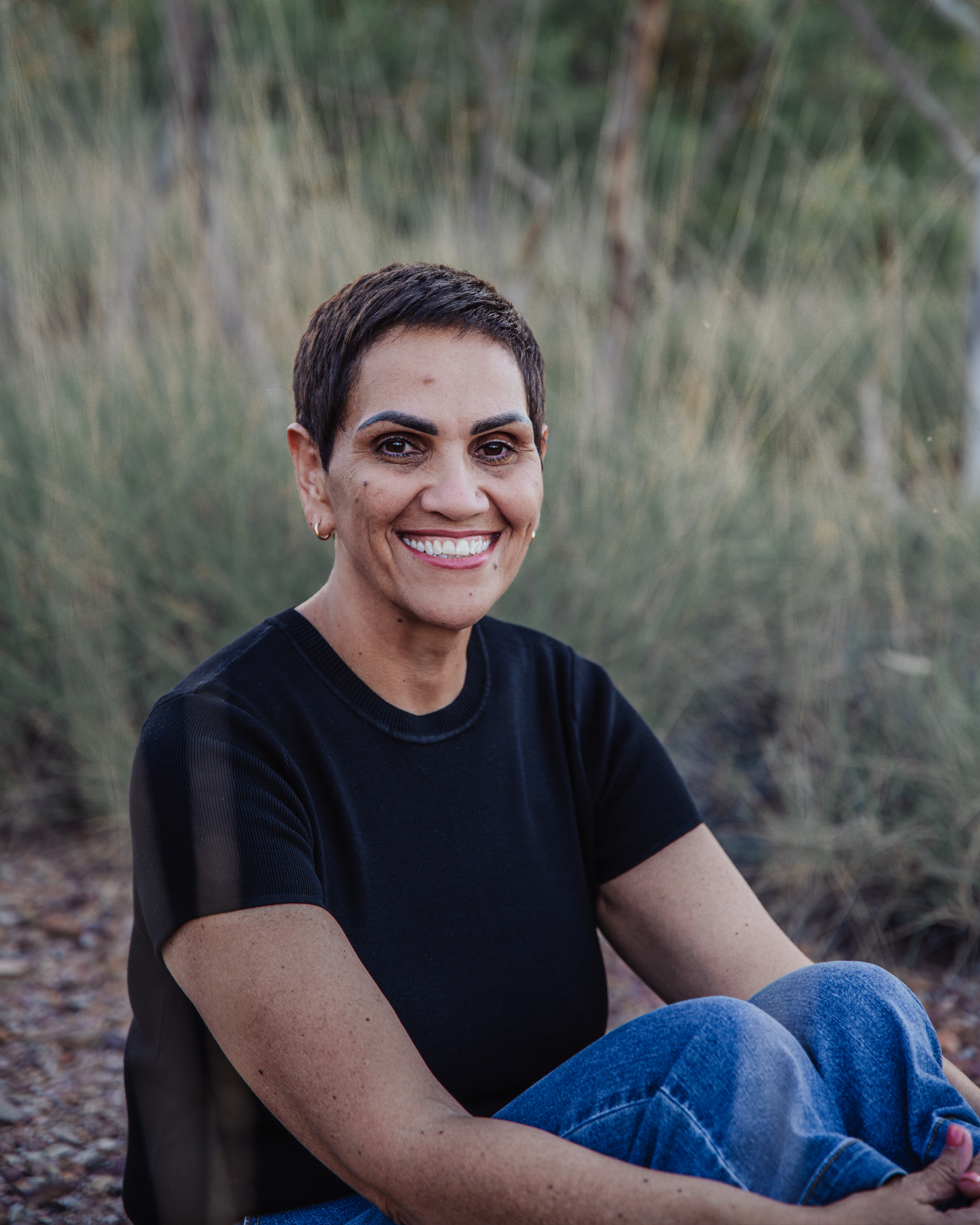
- Born: Cloncurry, Queensland, Australia
- Citizenship: Australian
- Occupations: Nurse, academic, researcher
- Known for: Indigenous nursing education; cultural safety; First Nations health leadership

Academic background
- Education: Deakin University; University of Southern Queensland; James Cook University

Academic work
- Discipline: Nursing; Aboriginal and Torres Strait Islander health; Indigenous health workforce development
- Institutions: Griffith University, University of Sydney, University of South Australia

Roianne West is an Australian Indigenous health scholar, nurse academic, and leader. She is a Kalkadunga and Djukunde woman from Queensland. West is recognized as the first Aboriginal nurse to complete a PhD in Aboriginal nursing in Australia. She serves as the first Aboriginal Chairperson of the Australian Nursing and Midwifery Accreditation Council (ANMAC). Her career includes the institutional integration of First Nations leadership within Australian nursing, academia, and healthcare governance. Her broader body of work is connected by a central theme of building knowledge, workforce pathways, institutions, leadership, professional reform, and historical memory for future generations of First Nations nurses and midwives.

== Early life and education ==
West was raised on her grandmother's ancestral lands in Cloncurry, Queensland. She comes from a family background of Indigenous healers and nurses passing across four generations. Her twin sister and brother are also nurses, and her daughters represent the fourth generation of nurses in her family. Along with her mother, West initially began working in healthcare as an Aboriginal Health Worker. Throughout her career, she has described nursing as both a profession and an inheritance, emphasizing intergenerational knowledge transfer and cultural continuity.

She pursued higher education at Deakin University's National Indigenous Knowledges, Education, Research, and Innovation (NIKERI) Institute, graduating with a Bachelor of Nursing in 2000 alongside her brother and twin sister. In 2008, she completed a Master of Mental Health Nursing at the University of Southern Queensland, where she developed the Aboriginal Australian Nursing Theory (Mucu-Mucucu), integrating concepts of culture, identity, and structural racism. This model integrates Aboriginal ways of knowing, being, and doing within nursing education, leadership, and practice. Her scholarship has additionally advanced Indigenous methodologies through Indigenist research methodologies, relational accountability, and First Nations Storywork.

In 2012, West earned her PhD from James Cook University, becoming the first Aboriginal nurse to complete a doctoral degree in Aboriginal nursing. Her doctoral research investigated ways to increase the recruitment, retention, and graduation rates of Indigenous nursing students in tertiary education.Her research findings directly contributed to national discussions regarding Indigenous nursing workforce development and educational equity.

== Academic career ==
West's early clinical and policy career included serving as an Indigenous Health Liaison Officer and later as a Clinical Nurse specializing in Indigenous Mental Health for Queensland Health between 2000 and 2004. She entered academia in 2005 as a lecturer for the Indigenous Health Unit in James Cook University's Faculty of Medicine. Her career includes serving as the inaugural Nursing Director of Indigenous Health at the Townsville Hospital and Health Service, making her the first Indigenous nurse to hold such a position in a Queensland tertiary hospital.

In 2014, West moved into academic leadership through a joint appointment between the Townsville Hospital and Health Service and Griffith University, marking the first time a joint Hospital/Health Service and University appointment was established for a Professor of Nursing for Indigenous Health in Australia. In 2015, she became the Foundation Professor of First Peoples Health at Griffith University's School of Nursing and Midwifery and then the faculty. During this time, she initiated the development of the university's First Peoples Health Unit, and going to become the first Dean of First Peoples Health at a Queensland university and among the first in Australia. Throughout her career, she became the first Aboriginal Professor of Nursing in Queensland and one of the first in Australia, holding the distinction of being the first Aboriginal Professor of Nursing appointed at Griffith University, the University of Sydney, and James Cook University.

West was appointed Chief Executive Officer of the Congress of Aboriginal and Torres Strait Islander Nurses and Midwives (CATSINaM) in 2020, becoming the first CEO of the organization to hold both a PhD and the rank of full Professor. During her tenure, she spearheaded the GENKE II educational reform initiative, established the Muliyan Indigenist Health and Cultural Safety Education Research Consortium, and directed the "In Our Own Right: Black Australian Nurses and Midwives Stories II" national exhibition. She also designed Murra Mullangari, an e-learning program focused on cultural safety and humility endorsed by the Nursing and Midwifery Board of Australia (NMBA), and played a leading role in advocating for a National Apology from the nursing and midwifery professions to Aboriginal and Torres Strait Islander peoples. West serves as the Chairperson of the Australian Nursing and Midwifery Accreditation Council (ANMAC), becoming the first Aboriginal person to hold the role.

== Awards and Recognition ==
In 2020, West was honored with the Lowitja Institute Cranlana Award for outstanding excellence in research leadership. That same year, she achieved international recognition when she was named a Principal Fellow of the Higher Education Academy (UK). In 2021, she received the Griffith University Program Excellence Teaching Award, alongside the James Cook University Chancellor's Award for the College of Healthcare Sciences and the Alumni of the Year Award. In 2023, she was named the Deakin University Alumni of the Year. In 2022, West received the National Aboriginal and Torres Strait Islander Health Worker Association (NATSIHWA) Overall Achievement Award.

In addition to her academic roles, West created specialized initiatives to expand First Nations infrastructure and pathways. This included developing Tjurtu (Coolimon), a Queensland-based program focused on mentoring, professional identity, and career progression. She also served as Program Patron and Ambassador for the Deadly Outstanding Workforce Leadership (OWL) Research Program, supporting First Nations nurses entering higher-degree research. Additionally, she designed national Cultural Safety training resources utilized across the Australian Health Practitioner Regulation Agency (Ahpra) Boards and National Accreditation Authorities.

== Selected Publications ==
=== Journal articles ===
- Power, Tamara; Mackay, Jacinta; Smallwood, Reakeeta; Best, Odette; West, Roianne (2025). "No more Nightingale". Contemporary Nurse. DOI: 10.1080/10376178.2025.2503300.
- Laccos-Barrett, Keera; Brown, Angela Elisabeth; Saunders, Vicki; Baldock, Katherine Lorraine; West, Roianne (2022). "Are We Teaching Nurses to Be Racist towards Aboriginal and Torres Strait Islander Peoples? A Critical Race Document Analysis of Discrete Aboriginal and Torres Strait Islander Health Courses". International Journal of Environmental Research and Public Health, volume 19, issue 18, p. 11455. DOI: 10.3390/ijerph191811455.
- West, Roianne; Stewart, Lee; Foster, Kim; Usher, Kim (2012). "Through a critical lens: indigenist research and the Dadirri method". Qualitative Health Research, volume 22, issue 11, pp. 1582–1590. DOI: 10.1177/1049732312457596.
- West, Roianne; West, Leeona; West, Karen; Usher, Kim (2010). To care for.pdf "Tjirtamai – 'To Care For': a nursing education model designed to increase the number of Aboriginal nurses in a rural and remote Queensland community". Contemporary Nurse, volume 37, issue 1, pp. 39–48. DOI: 10.5172/conu.2011.37.1.39.
- West, Roianne; Usher, Kim; Foster, Kim (2010). "Increased numbers of Australian Indigenous nurses would make a significant contribution to 'closing the gap' in Indigenous health: what is getting in the way?". Contemporary Nurse, volume 36, issue 1–2, pp. 121–130. DOI: 10.5172/conu.2010.36.1–2.121.

=== Book chapters ===
- Usher, Kim; Mills, Jane; West, Roianne (2014). "Diversity in the context of multicultural communities: implications for nursing and midwifery practice". In Daly, John; Speedy, Sandra; Jackson, Debra (eds.). Contexts of Nursing: An Introduction (4th ed.). Chatswood, NSW: Elsevier. pp. 339–353. ISBN 978-0-7295-4161-9.
- West, Roianne; Usher, Kim (2011). "The mental health of Australia's Aboriginal and Torres Strait Islander people". In Edward, Karen-leigh; Munro, Ian; Robins, Alan; Welch, Anthony (eds.). Mental Health Nursing: Dimensions of Praxis. Melbourne: Oxford University Press. pp. 397–408. ISBN 978-0-1955-7440-1.

=== Doctoral thesis ===
- West, Roianne (2012). Indigenous Australian participation in pre-registration tertiary nursing courses: an Indigenous mixed methods study (PhD thesis). James Cook University. HDL: 11012/15340
