= New Zealand Nurses in the South African War =

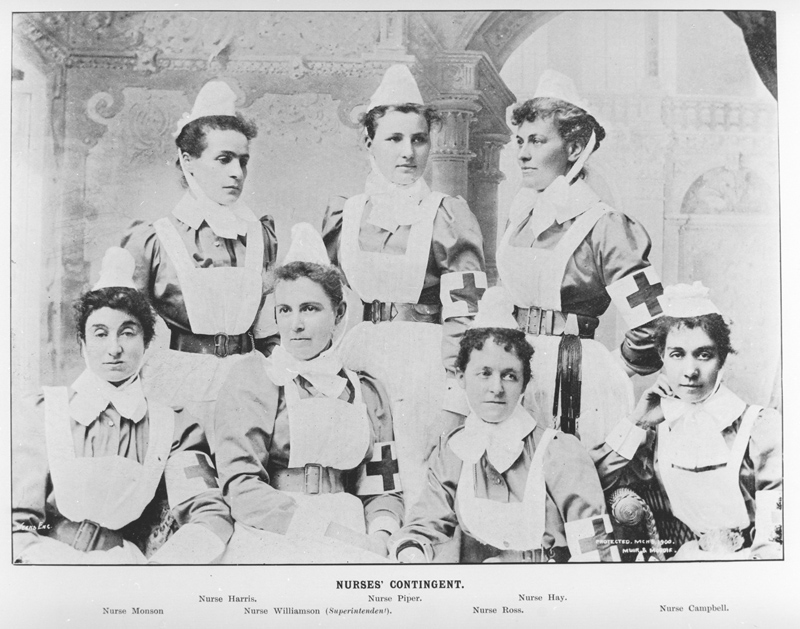
From left to right: Nurse Monson, Nurse Harris, Nurse Williamson (Superintendent), Nurse Piper, Nurse Ross, Nurse Hay, Nurse Campbell.

The profession of nursing in New Zealand was newly emerging when the South African War (1899–1902) broke out. This provided an opportunity for New Zealand women civilian nurses to showcase their professional skills as well as their patriotism.

In September 1899, New Zealand was the first country of the British Colonies to respond, offering men for South Africa. Subsequently, New Zealand troops were the first to land and eager to show their loyalty to Britain. This however, did not include New Zealand nurses who had to campaign for the opportunity to serve.

In October 1899 the Otago Daily Times reported, "Several nurses in Christchurch have offered to accompany the contingent to South Africa". The offer to send New Zealand nurses to South Africa was initially rejected by the Imperial War Department, however after vigorous campaigning from nurses and later support from the New Zealand Government, six trained nurses were accepted. Some nurses were not compensated by the New Zealand Government but by local patriotic committees who supported nurses through fund-raising.

== The First Nurses ==
The first New Zealand nurses to go to South Africa sailed on board the SS Lincolnshire, departing Lyttleton as reported in the Auckland Star in January 1900,

"The steamer Lincolnshire is to leave Lyttleton for South Africa via Albany, tomorrow evening. She takes 25,000 sacks of oats, a quantity of other horse feed, and nurses who volunteered for service in South Africa will be passengers by her."

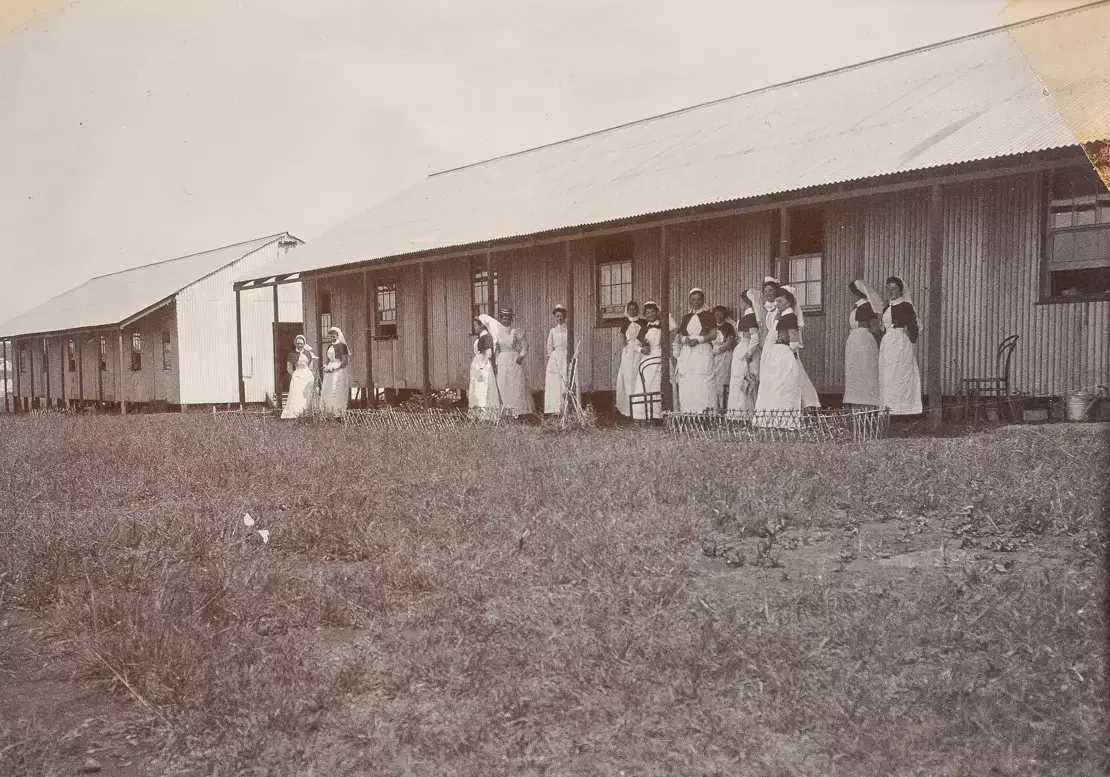
Nurses at Howick

They arrived in Durban on 27 February 1900. A group of four nurses; Gertrude Littlecott, Emily Jane Peter, Grace Henderson Webster, and Annie H. Hiatt were supported by the Imperial Government to travel to South Africa. The other two nurses, Mabel Ethelind Brooke-Smith and Geraldine Constance Jeffrey paid their own way. This group of six women became the first nurses to represent New Zealand in an overseas military campaign.

== Military Hospitals ==
The No 4 General Hospital at Mooi River in Natal was the largest field hospital (housing 1,000 beds) during the South African War. The first four nurses were stationed there and stayed in the nearby camp, Howick. The hospital was relatively well equipped for the time, with electric lighting and the ability to carry out X-rays.

What these nurses experienced in Military hospitals was vastly different from their experiences working in civilian hospitals. Some hospitals were ill-equipped and the conditions were dire due to poor sanitation practices. Enteric fever was the cause of the most casualties during the South African War.

== Perceptions of Women ==
Prevailing perceptions of women at the time influenced the way nurses were treated in their work. Victorian values insisted war was a male only affair with which women had no place. Many believed a woman nurses' role was to be self sacrificing, devoted and 'lady like' in their approach. Nurses with a more serious disposition were often criticised for being less 'womanly'.

It is noted that tensions were present between some nurses and the male orderlies at the military hospitals who, many nurses believed, had not obtained an appropriate level of medical training but were often treated with more respect by the male doctors and soldiers.

== Prince Christian's Army Nursing Service Reserve ==
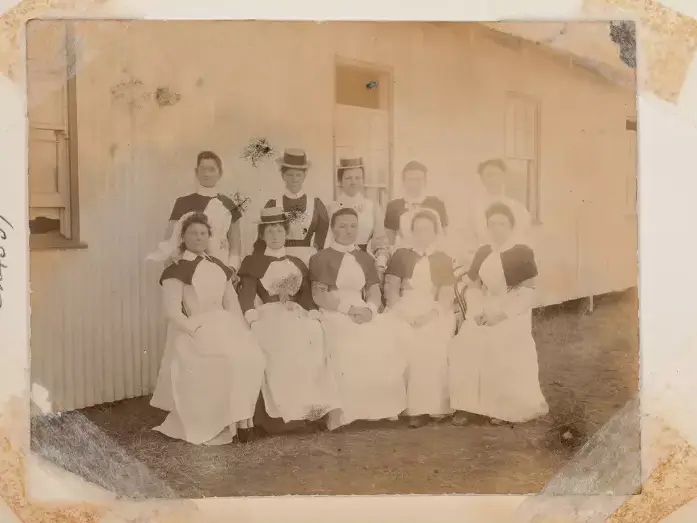
Eight New Zealand nurses (possibly outside the Sister's Quarters, Howick Hospital).

As there was no official established New Zealand nursing service at the time (New Zealand Army Nursing Service was established in 1915 during World War I), they served under the British Army Nursing Service and once in South Africa, were attached to the Prince Christian's Army Nursing Service Reserve (PCANSR). Between 1899 and 1902 the PCANSR supplied around 1400 nurses from across Canada, Australia and New Zealand to the South African War effort. The PCANSR was the basis of the later established, Queen Alexandria's Imperial Military Nursing Service (QAIMNS), which launched on the 27 March 1902.

=== Uniforms ===
Because the New Zealand Government did not cover the costs for all the nurses, New Zealand nurses were not issued with distinctive official uniform. New Zealand nurses part of the Army Nursing Service Reserve (ANSR) however wore a fern pin above their red cross armbands in order to identify themselves from other nationalities in the reserve.

== List of the New Zealand Nurses ==
Although records are incomplete, it is documented that around 33 New Zealand nurses served in the South Africa War. All of these women were awarded the Queen's South Africa Medal.

Annie Hickman Hiatt

Annie Hickman Hiatt (b. 1 August 1865- d. 21 February 1957), was born in England and moved to New Zealand as a child with her family, settling in Christchurch. She was one of the first nurses from New Zealand who volunteered for overseas service. Arriving in Durban in February 1900, she went on to spend a total of two and a half years in South Africa. She worked in military hospitals such as No. 4 General Hospital at Mooi River Camp in Natal and later at No. 13 Stationary Hospital at Pinetown Bridge. Upon her return to New Zealand in August 1902, Hiatt was also awarded the King's South Africa Medal.

Dora Louisa Harris

Dora Louisa Harris (d.1934), was born in Australia but moved to New Zealand and trained as a nurse at Dunedin Hospital. She was one of the nurses who through community fundraising, paid her own way to travel to South Africa and contribute to the war effort as a nurse. She worked in the No. 8 General Hospital in Bloemfontein, which was noted to be overfull with patients and lacking in adequate staffing. Harris was invalided to New Zealand in 1901.

Jane Emily Peter

Jane Emily Peter (b. 1858- d. 10 April 1927) was born in Burra, South Australia and later settled in Christchurch. She was in charge of the first group of nurses who went to South Africa and is noted to have been one of the first nurses to enter Ladysmith after the besiegement of the town was lifted. Peter went on to enlist in the Lady Paget Unit during World War I, serving in France and Serbia.

Grace Henderson Webster

Grace Henderson Webster (later Morley) (b. 1861- d.27 April 1944) arrived in Durban in March 1900, her passage paid for by the Imperial Government. She nursed at No. 5 Hospital, Mooi in central Natal for eighteen months before being transferred to Pretoria in February 1902. Webster was also awarded the King's South Africa Medal.

Gertrude Littlecott

Gertrude Littlecott (b.1867 - d.1959) trained at Christchurch Hospital, Southland Hospital and Christchurch Maternity House between 1894 and 1899. She served on a South African Hospital train for two years during the War.

=== Janet Speed ===
Janet Speed (later Gillies) (d. 24 July 1947) was born in Wanganui and trained at Wellington Hospital. She was one of the nurses who paid their way to serve in South Africa in late 1900. Speed then enlisted in the PCANSR which meant she was paid by the British government. During her time in South Africa, Speed up-skilled her nursing proficiency and took a military nursing course at the Royal Victoria Hospital in Netley, England. When she returned to New Zealand in 1903, she worked with the Order of St John Ambulance District Nursing Guild where she was elected as Honorary Serving Sister. Later she became the first Matron-in-Chief to the New Zealand Medical Corps Nursing Service Reserve which formed in 1908. She was also awarded the King's South Africa Medal.

=== Mabel Ethelind Brooke-Smith ===
Mabel Ethelind Brooke-Smith (later Younghusband) (d.1968) was trained in Christchurch Hospital from 1897 to 1900. She worked on a hospital train transporting wounded and sick soldiers from Belmont to Magersfontein and served on the transport ship SS Orcana, transporting soldiers to Netley Hospital.

=== Geraldine Constance Jeffreys ===
Geraldine Constance Jeffreys (d.1957) trained at Christchurch Hospital from 1896 to 1900 with Mabel Ethelind Brooke-Smith. She also served on board the transport ship SS Orcana. She then worked at the base hospital at Pietermaritzburg and Charleston Hospital. During WWI she a Night Sister on board the Indian Hospital Ship, Madras. Then in WWII she served for a year transporting personnel returning to England from India.

=== Janet Wyse Mackie Williamson ===
Janet Wyse Mackie Williamson (b. 26 September 1862- d. 12 March 1936) trained at Dunedin Hospital. She served as Lady Superintendent of the group and worked at the No.10 General Hospital then on the Hospital Ship Roslyn Castle. On 4 September 1901 she was Mentioned in dispatches by Lord Roberts (British commander and chief) and was then awarded the Royal Red Cross, becoming the first New Zealand nurse to be given this award.

=== Dora Louisa Harris ===
Dora Louisa Harris (later McGregor) (d.1934) was born in South Africa but trained at Dunedin Hospital. She served at the No. 2 Hospital, Wynberg then at the No.8 Hospital at Bloemfontein. She later became the Crown Solicitor of Otago (1914–20) and was appointed Supreme Court Judge in 1923.

=== Elizabeth Rennie Hay ===
Elizabeth Rennie Hay (later Mackenzie) (b.1869 - d.21 March 1944) trained at Dunedin Hospital. Due to a family connection with Joseph Ward, she was given permission to travel to South Africa with the Otago Contingent. She worked at Middleburg Hospital in Pretoria as well as in the Boer prison camps. She was also awarded the King's South Africa Medal.

=== Nellie Dean Redstone ===
Nellie (or Ellen) Dean Redstone (later Wilcox) (b.1875 - d. 1 October 1954) was from Gisborne. She travelled to South Africa with Margaret Carston. She was awarded her Queen's South Africa medal by King Edward VII in London.

=== Ellen Maria Monson ===
Ellen (or Nellie) Maria Monson (b.11 May 1864 - d. 8 December 1935) was trained at Dunedin Hospital and served in the South African War 1900–1901.

=== Maud Campbell Eagle ===
Maud Campbell Eagle (d.1948) trained at Guys Hospital and received her nursing medal from Florence Nightingale. During the South African War she became a member of the Cape Town Mounted Rifles Nursing Service and nursed through the siege of Ladysmith and remained in South Africa after the war.

=== Helen Francis Griffiths ===
Helen Francis Griffiths (later Thurlow) was from Wanganui and trained at Wellington Hospital. She was then Matron of a military hospital in South Africa from 1906 to 1908.

=== Dora Webb ===
Dora Webb was from Ormondville and trained at Wellington Hospital. In 1902, she went to South Africa and nursed in the Prisoner of War camps.

=== Emily Marianne Rowley ===
Emily Marianne Rowley (later Handyside) (d. 1937) was from Invercargill and trained in Wellington Hospital. After some service, she was invalided from the South African War and returned to New Zealand.

=== Margaret Carston ===
Margaret Carston (d. 31 October 1953) was Gisborne and trained at Timaru Hospital. She travelled to South Africa with Nellie Dean Redstone.

=== Winifred Grace Morris ===
Winnifred Grace Morris (later Retemeyer) (d. 14 November 1924) was from Canterbury but was nursing in a hospital in England when the South African War broke out. She served in a Dutch refugee camp in Pretoria which had been established for women and children.

=== Rose Lina Shappere ===
Rose Lina Shappere was from Timaru but nursed in Melbourne. She was the first New Zealand nurse to arrive in South Africa, landing in Cape Town in June 1899. She served in the No. 4 Intombi Hospital and during the siege of Ladysmith. She was also Mentioned in dispatches in the Australian Official List.

=== Leila Vere-Hodge ===
Leila Vere-Hodge (later Thomson) was from Wanganui and completed her nursing training at Christchurch Hospital. After the War she remained in South Africa with Gertrude Littlecott and they both worked with the Imperial Diamond Mines and later in Belgium and Congo, becoming the first New Zealand nurses employed as Industrial Health Nurses.

=== Elizabeth Persis Barter Taepe ===
Elizabeth (Bessie) Persis Barter Taepe (also known as McMurtie then Rattray) (d. 26 May 1944) was born in Queensland and completed her nursing training in Christchurch. During the South African War she served at the No.10 General Hospital at Bloemfontein, the Wimburg Military Hospital and on board the transport ship Paconia which transported the sick and wounded to England. In recognition of her service she received a prayer book from Queen Victoria. She also served in WWI.

=== Eva Florence Godfray ===
Eva (Eveline) Florence Godfray (also documented as Godfrey) (d. 9 August 1958) was trained at London Hospital before serving in the South African War. Later she was Matron at Dannevirke Hospital and Cook Hospital in Gisborne.

=== Jessie Ann Clarke ===
Jessie Ann Clarke was born in England and trained in Auckland. She served in South Africa then later nursed in New Zealand before settling in Virginia, USA.

=== Dora Peiper ===
Dora Peiper (later Oliphant ) (b. 1879 - d. 12 May 1935) trained at Invercargill Hospital. She served in at Wynberg, Bloemfontein, Pretoria, Beaufort West and on the Roslyn Castle and Britannic. She was also Mentioned in dispatches by Lord Kitchener.

=== Mary Elizabeth Warmington ===
Mary Elizabeth Warmington (later Thomson) (b. 17 November 1860 - d. 1941) was from Wanganui and trained at Christchurch Hospital. While serving in South Africa she was invalided back to New Zealand. In 1925 she traveled to Finland to represent New Zealand at the International Council of Nurses Congress.

=== Sarah Jane Ross ===
Sarah Jane Ross (later Noonan) (d. 1 November 1951) trained at Dunedin Hospital then served in South Africa before being invalided back to New Zealand. She was awarded her Queen's South Africa Medal by the Duchess of Cornwall and York.

=== Isobella Campbell ===
Isobella Campbell (b.1869 - d. 1 November 1935) first trained as a midwife at Clapham's Maternity Institute. After her service in the South African Wars she remained in South Africa doing private nursing.

=== Nora Stevens ===
Nora Stevens (later Dalrymple and also documented as Steven) was from Rangitikei and nursed in Pretoria, Cape Town and Heidelberg. She was one of the recipients of the King's South Africa medal.

=== Laura R. Woollcombe ===
Laura R. Woollcombe (d. 1948) was noted to have been the first Pākehā girl to be born in Timaru. She trained at Timaru then at St. Bartholomew's in London. She gained her nursing certificate in 1892, becoming the first New Zealand nurse to receive this certification which was presented to her by Florence Nightingale. She joined the PCANSR and was appointed Sister-in-Charge of the first unit of 30 nurses to leave England for service in South Africa.

=== Sister Matson ===
Sister Matson travelled to South Africa with her brother, Corporal Matson of No. 1 Company, 1st Contingent aboard the Waiwera.

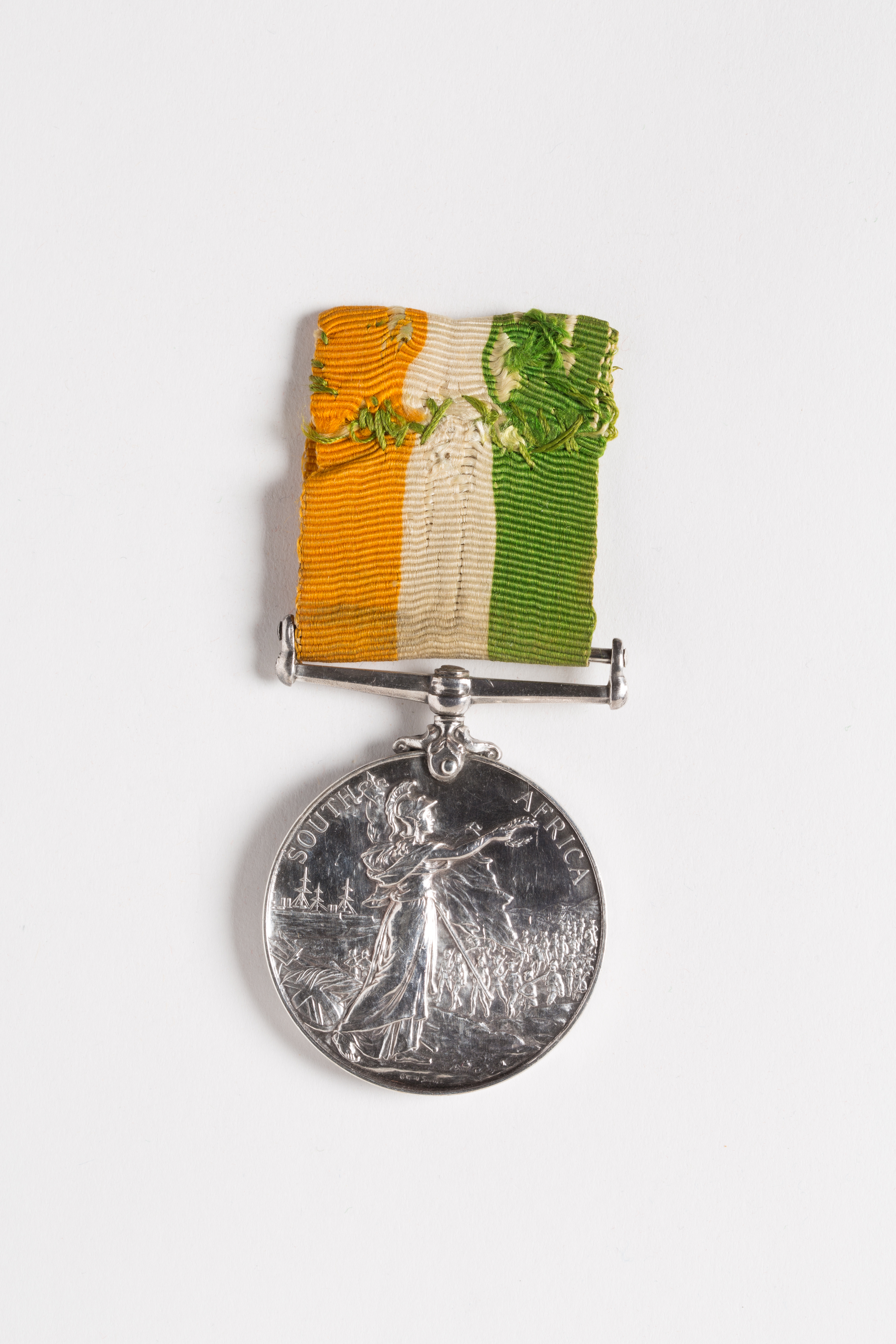
King's South Africa Medal 1901–2, awarded to Nursing Sister Anne H Hiatt. Auckland Museum Collection.

== King & Queen's South Africa Medals ==
The Queen's South Africa Medal was established by Queen Victoria, awarded to recognise service in the South African War. All nurses were who served in South Africa were awarded the Queen's South Africa Medal, without clasps.

After the death of Queen Victoria in 1901, Edward VII took the thrown and the King South Africa Medal was established. Only six New Zealand nurses who nursed in the South African Wars were presented to the King for the war medal. They had all served 18 months at the front and were on active service on 1 January 1902 or completed their term before 1 June 1902.

== Ngāpuhi Nursing Sisters ==
While Māori were generally denied the opportunity to serve with the New Zealand Army, despite being 'British subjects' by law. This meant a group of wāhine Māori, known as the Ngāpuhi Nursing Sisters were excluded from serving as nurses too. Instead, the Ngāpuhi nursing sisters focused on nursing their own communities and fundraising to support troops in South Africa. The Ngāpuhi nursing sisters were Louisa Kingi, A. Calkin, C. Calkin, Kohu Gertrude Waetford, and M. Kaire.
