= Brandon McClelland (actor) =

Australian actor

- Born: 12 January 1992 (age 33); New South Wales, Australia
- Education: National Institute of Dramatic Art
- Occupation: Actor
- Years active: 2013–present

Brandon McClelland (born 12 January, 1992) is an Australian stage, television and film actor. He is best known for his portrayals of Pat Dooley in ANZAC Girls (for which he was Logie-nominated) and Hendrix Cunningham in Totally Completely Fine.

== Early life ==
McClelland was born in Penrith, New South Wales before moving to Batemans Bay, New South Wales, his long-time home town. He attended the National Institute of Dramatic Art in 2010, and graduated in 2012.

== Credits ==
=== Film and television ===
Year	Title	Role	Notes
2014	Devil's Playground	Marty Slocum	1 episode
2014	ANZAC Girls	Norval 'Pat' Dooley	5 episodes
2014–2015	Love Child	Robert Donnelly	3 episodes
2015	Truth	Don Mapes	Feature Film
2016	Here Come the Habibs	Blair	1 episode
2017	Star Sand	Bob	Feature Film
2019	The Other Guy	Turren	4 episodes
2020	Black Comedy	Guest Cast	2 episodes
2020	Operation Buffalo	Vic	1 episode
2021	Doctor Doctor	Solicitor	1 episode
2021	The Moth Effect	Guest Cast	1 episode
2022	Significant Others	Mr. Huntley	1 episode
2023	Totally Completely Fine	Hendrix Cunningham	6 episodes
2023	Gold Diggers	Leonard	7 episodes
2023	C*A*U*G*H*T	Gary Garry	3 episodes
2023	The Artful Dodger	Sailor Pike	1 episode

=== Theatre ===
Year	Title	Role	Director	Theatre
2014	M.Rock	Chorus C	Fraser Corfield	Wharf 2, Sydney Theatre Company
2015	Suddenly Last Summer	George Holly	Kip Williams	Drama Theatre, Sydney Opera House
2015	A Town Named Warboy	Tom	Fraser Corfield	State Library of New South Wales
2015	The Present	Dimitri	John Crowley (director)	Roslyn Packer Theatre
2016	The Golden Age (Louis Nowra play)	Francis	Kip Williams	Wharf 1, Sydney Theatre Company
2016	Fracture	Charlie	Lucy Clements	Old Fitz Theatre
2016	A Midsummer Night's Dream	Demetrius	Kip Williams	Drama Theatre, Sydney Opera House
2017	The Present (Broadway)	Dimitri	John Crowley	Ethel Barrymore Theatre
2017	Who's Afraid of Virginia Woolf?	Nick	Iain Sinclair	Ensemble Theatre
2017	Little Borders	Steve	Dominic Mercer	Old 505 Theatre
2017	Three Sisters (play)	Andrei	Kip Williams	Drama Theatre, Sydney Opera House
2018	Flight Paths	Tom/Max	Anthea Williams	National Theatre of Parramatta
2018	Saint Joan (play)	Jean de Dunois	Imara Savage	Roslyn Packer Theatre
2018	A Cheery Soul	Reverend Wakeman	Kip Williams	Drama Theatre, Sydney Opera House
2019	Girl in the Machine	Owen	Claudia Barrie	National Theatre of Parramatta
2019	Packer & Sons	Clyde Packer	Eamon Flack	Belvoir Theatre
2020	The Deep Blue Sea (play)	Philip Welch	Paige Rattray	Roslyn Packer Theatre
2022	Light Shining in Buckinghamshire	Henry Ireton	Eamon Flack	Belvoir Theatre
2022	Wayside Bride	Ted Noffs	Hannah Goodwin	Belvoir Theatre
2023	Scenes from the Climate Era	Various	Carissa Licciardello	Belvoir Theatre
2023	The Importance of Being Earnest	Jack Worthing	Sarah Giles	Roslyn Packer Theatre

== Awards and nominations ==
Year	Award	Category	Result
2015	57th TV Week Logie Awards	Graham Kennedy Award for Most Outstanding New Talent	Nominated
2015	Equity Ensemble Awards	Outstanding Performance by an Ensemble Cast in a Television Mini Series or Telemovie	Won
2017	Sydney Theatre Awards	Best Male Actor in a Supporting Role in a Mainstage Production	Nominated
2019	Sydney Theatre Awards	Best Male Actor in a Supporting Role in a Mainstage Production	Nominated
