= Totally Completely Fine =

Australian dark comedy television series

- Genre: Dark comedy
- Written by: Gretel Vella
- Directed by: Lucy Gaffy
- Starring: Thomasin McKenzie; Devon Terrell; Contessa Treffone; Rowan Witt; Brandon McClelland
- Country of origin: Australia
- Original language: English
- No. of seasons: 1
- No. of episodes: 6

Production
- Executive producers: Nat Lindwall; Gretel Vella
- Running time: 47–50 minutes
- Production company: Fremantle Australia

Original release
- Network: Stan; SundanceNow
- Release: 20 April 2023

Totally Completely Fine is an Australian dark comedy television series produced by Stan in association with SundanceNow. It stars Thomasin McKenzie as Vivian Cunningham, a twenty-something who inherits her grandfather's home which is a popular suicide jumping spot. The series premiered on both platforms on 20 April 2023.

== Plot ==
When Vivian's (Thomasin McKenzie) grandfather passes away in his sleep, she inherits his clifftop home that is regularly visited by people attempting to die by suicide. Vivian learns that her grandad had been talking people out of jumping for years, saving hundreds of lives. After saving the life of runaway bride Amy (Contessa Treffone), Vivian starts to take on the responsibility of helping those who come to the cliff while also adjusting to her new life in "the Crevice".

== Cast ==
=== Main ===
- Thomasin McKenzie as Vivian Cunningham
- Contessa Treffone as Amy Matthews, a runaway bride who moves in with Vivian
- Devon Terrell as Dane, Vivian's neighbour who offers his help as a psychologist
- Brandon McClelland as Hendrix Cunningham
- Rowan Witt as John Cunningham

=== Recurring ===
- Édgar Vittorino as Alejandro, John's partner
- Genevieve Lemon as Lorraine Matthews
- Max Crean as Louis, a local paperboy

=== Guests ===
- Sandy Gore as Gloria
- John Noble as Wilkinson

== Episodes ==
| No. overall | No. in season | Title | Directed by | Written by | Original release date |
|---|---|---|---|---|---|
| 1 | 1 | "Welcome to the Crevice" | Lucy Gaffy | Gretel Vella | 20 April 2023 |
| 2 | 2 | "The Best Offence is the Fence" | Lucy Gaffy | Gretel Vella | 20 April 2023 |
| 3 | 3 | "Juan De Vacaciones" | Lucy Gaffy | Emme Hoy | 20 April 2023 |
| 4 | 4 | "Not All Heroes Carry Vape" | Adrian Chiarella | Keir Wilkins | 20 April 2023 |
| 5 | 5 | "You're a Sexy Fucking Mess" | Lucy Gaffy | Gretel Vella | 20 April 2023 |
| 6 | 6 | "Totally Completely Fine" | Lucy Gaffy | Gretel Vella | 20 April 2023 |

== Production ==
The series was created and executive produced by Gretel Vella, who also wrote four of the six episodes. It was announced to be in development by Stan on 24 March 2022, then under the title of The Jump. The main cast was announced in August 2022, with filming beginning the same month in Sydney.

== Release ==
A trailer was released on 29 March 2023. All six episodes released on Stan on 20 April 2023, with the first two episodes released in the United States on SundanceNow and AMC+ the same day. Further episodes were released on the platform weekly on Thursdays. Fremantle International holds distribution rights for the series in other territories.
