= ANZAC Girls =

- Genre: Period drama
- Based on: The Other ANZACs by Peter Rees
- Starring: Georgia Flood; Anna McGahan; Caroline Craig; Antonia Prebble; Laura Brent
- Composer: Bryony Marks
- Country of origin: Australia
- Original language: English
- No. of episodes: 6

Production
- Executive producers: Des Monaghan; Greg Haddrick; David Ogilvy
- Producers: Lisa Scott; Felicity Packard
- Cinematography: Geoffrey Hall
- Editors: Anne Carter; Denise Haratzis
- Camera setup: Single camera
- Running time: 60 minutes
- Production company: Screentime

Original release
- Network: ABC1
- Release: 10 August – 14 September 2014

ANZAC Girls is an Australian television drama series that first screened on ABC1 on 10 August 2014. The six-part series tells the rarely told true stories of the nurses serving with the Australian Army Nursing Service at Alexandria, Lemnos, and the Western Front during the First World War. The series is based on Peter Rees' book The Other ANZACs as well as diaries, letters, photographs and historical documents. The series was written by Felicity Packard and Niki Aken, produced by Screentime, and filmed in South Australia.

== Cast ==
- Anna McGahan as Sister Olive Haynes
- Caroline Craig as Matron Grace Wilson
- Georgia Flood as Sister Alice Ross-King
- Laura Brent as Sister Elsie Cook
- Antonia Prebble as Sister Hilda Steele
- Todd Lasance as Major Sydney 'Syd' Cook
- Dustin Clare as Lieutenant Harry Moffitt
- Brandon McClelland as Lieutenant Norval 'Pat' Dooley
- John Waters as Colonel Thomas Fiaschi
- Charles Mayer as Major Xavier Leopold
- Thomas Cocquerel as Lieutenant Frank Smith
- Honey Debelle as Sister Kit McNaughton
- Rhondda Findleton as Matron Ellen "Nellie" Gould
- Sara West as Clarice Daley
- Leon Ford as Major John Prior
- Hannah Marshall as Sister Millicent Parker
- Charlotte Hazzard as Sister Florence Tilly
- Maddy Jevic as Sister Meg Hayes
- Nathaniel Dean as Major Lionel Quick
- Brad Williams as Major Archibald Springer
- Nicholas Bell as General William Birdwood
- Josef Ber as Major Sherwin
- Bonnie Soper as Jessie Verey
- Clarence Ryan as Private Billy Tinker

== Episodes ==
No.	Title	Directed by	Written by	Original release date
1	"Adventure"	Ken Cameron	Felicity Packard	10 August 2014
The nurses arrive in Cairo, Egypt (perhaps Ghezireh Red Cross Hospital at Gezira) from Australia and five principal characters are introduced, all depicting real protagonists. Matron Grace Wilson, is seen as a strong leader, but kind and helpful to those under her: Sister Alice is seen to be the strongest of the four nurses; Olive the lovable larrikin; Hilda the shy, religious, uncertain New Zealander; and Elsie Shepherd, an upper-class girl who briefly hides the fact she is married to Lieutenant "Syd" Cook, son of ex-P.M. Joseph Cook. She is depicted as using her maiden name, because as a married woman she would not be eligible for overseas service. (This may be a fiction.) Each is prepared for a grand adventure, although some seem to have ideas other than nursing on their minds. Alice goes sight-seeing with the gauche Lieut. Frank Smith; meets Major Xavier Leopold, a British doctor, who adores her; and finally Lieut. Harry Moffitt who reads to her from a book of verse and she is smitten. Hilda is among those chosen to join British hospital ship HMHS Sicilia bound for Gallipoli, experiences shelling and tends some of the first casualties, working long hours. Her friend Millicent breaks down. Back in Cairo, the surgeons are overwhelmed with casualties from Gallipoli, so Alice and Olive undertake procedures beyond their calling. Elsie finds Syd among the wounded, he recuperates and returns to Gallipoli, as does Harry. Frank is admitted with a punctured lung, he is repatriated to Australia but first proposes to Alice; she makes no commitment.
2	"Duty"	Ken Cameron	Niki Aken, Felicity Packard	17 August 2014
Matron Wilson and Olive and are among the nurses sent from Cairo to the island of Lemnos to establish a forward field hospital, to care for the less severely wounded from Gallipoli. They have no shelter and little water, limited supplies and grudging recognition from the Australian Army, as exemplified by Colonel Fiaschi, who would send all women back if he had his way. In Cairo, Elsie learns Syd has been seriously wounded, pleads with Matron Gould for leave to visit him at No. 19 B.G.H., Alexandria. She persuades their Matron Oram to get her transferred to the British service, and nurses Syd back to health. Dysentery strikes Lemnos due to flies and lack of sanitation; Matron Jaggard dies and Olive is one of those to suffer, but refuses an offer to be evacuated. She meets an orderly, Pat Dooley, whose company she enjoys. Having volunteered for the V.D. ward, No. 1 A.G.H., Cairo (perhaps Military Infectious Diseases Hospital at Choubra), Alice assists Leopold in giving lectures on prevention to the troops.
3	"Endurance"	Ken Cameron	Niki Aken, Felicity Packard	24 August 2014
Harry is wounded and sent to Cairo, so he and Alice meet again. Leopold proposes to her and she is noncommittal, waiting for a sign of affection from the laconic Harry. Syd's recovery is slow, and Elsie argues for him to be sent to England for treatment; she is sent back to Cairo and Oram is not sorry to see her go. Olive's friends Poppy and Lorna are among the nurses returning from Lemnos aboard the troopship Marquette, which is sunk by a torpedo from a German submarine. Winter arrives and soldiers arrive on Lemnos suffering frostbite. Olive's friend Clarice agrees to marry Sgt Lawrence, just to get off the island. Olive is contemptuous. Fiaschi suffers from beri-beri and is evacuated to Cairo, where the once antagonistic colonel stoutly defends the Lemnos nurses. Troops withdraw from Gallipoli and the five nurses are reunited in Cairo. Elsie volunteers for duty aboard ship Demosthenes taking wounded men back to Australia, where she can care for Syd, but knows she will be barred from serving overseas again. Harry proposes to Alice and she accepts.
4	"Love"	Ian Watson	Felicity Packard	31 August 2014
The nurses are sent to France, at first under UK command as British No. 11. British Stationary Hospital, Rouen, under Ward Sister Bullus, and discover the difference between British and Australian ideas of discipline and order. Alice encounters Private Pat Dooley digging a latrine pit. The nurses organise an Anzac Day commemoration. They begin treating serious injuries from the Somme. Alice gets news from Harry, who's been transferred to 53rd Battalion and sent to the Somme, where the battalion is fighting. Matron Wilson is promoted and leaves for London, where she hopes to improve relations between the Army and the Nursing Service. Pat has had officer training and returns as Lieutenant Dooley; he proposes to Olive. She flees, but catches him the following day and accepts, telling him that she has volunteered for the No. 2 Australian Casualty Clearing Station at Trois Arbres. Returning from a picnic with her friends, Alice is informed that Harry was killed at Fromelles. She receives his last letter.
5	"Mateship"	Ian Watson	Niki Aken	7 September 2014
Hilda is working as theatre nurse, reluctantly takes over from anaesthetist and proves herself capable. Dooley catches up with Olive at the Trois Arbres field station; there is a gas attack and not enough masks for everyone — they improvise; Dooley proposes and she accepts. Hilda and Alice are among those who get anaesthetics training — Hilda tops the class; then orders come through that Australian nurses are not to do surgery, but being a New Zealander she is exempt. Alice refuses to accept Harry is dead, finally receives confirmation, contemplates suicide but is comforted by Hilda. Dooley is seriously wounded but thanks to Olive he gets surgery where another would have been classed beyond saving. He is repatriated and Olive volunteers for service on hospital ship bound for Australia. There is a reunion: Elsie had joined the Red Cross, who didn't mind that she was married, hence was able to serve in France. Alice and Hilda volunteer for duty at the Casualty Clearing Station, closer to the Front.
6	"Courage"	Ian Watson	Felicity Packard	14 September 2014
Elsie is working in a French hospital in Amiens; she knows Syd is back at the Front, but not where. Alice and Hilda arrive at the clearing station and are subjected to air attacks. They are heroic in futile attempts to save patients, then are befriended by a small cat. Elsie hitches a ride to Fricourt to see Syd, who's with 2nd Battalion; back from the Front, he is too traumatised to say much but in a tender scene is bathed and comforted by Elsie. Alice is awarded the Military Medal, presented by Birdwood himself; Major Leopold, with some grace, proposes again and once again Alice refuses, but gratefully. Elsie gets a call from Syd, inviting her to London to meet his parents. She refuses; this time duty comes first; and refuses again when he sees her in person, in a scene that shows him in a less favorable light. Alice nurses some injured German POW's who have been ignored and forgotten. She contemplates the God who is claimed by both sides and becomes fatalistic, while Hilda's faith is reinforced by the fact of her survival. They return to the field hospital and are greeted by Sister Wilson. Following the Armistice and the end of the war, ANZAC soldiers and nurses celebrate in a French town; we are then given a glimpse of the Girls' post-war lives. The chapter closes with some historical facts, and photos of the actual women depicted in the series.

== Ratings ==
No.	Title	Air date	Overnight ratings		Consolidated ratings		Total viewers	Ref(s)
No.	Title	Air date	Viewers	Rank	Viewers	Rank	Total viewers	Ref(s)
1	Adventure	10 August 2014	1,062,000	5	187,000	2	1,249,000	
2	Duty	17 August 2014	875,000	8	202,000	6	1,077,000	
3	Endurance	24 August 2014	758,000	8	168,000	6	926,000	
4	Love	31 August 2014	800,000	8	134,000	7	934,000	
5	Mateship	7 September 2014	783,000	8	202,000	7	985,000	
6	Courage	14 September 2014	817,000	8	202,000	7	1,019,000	

== Awards and nominations ==
Year	Award	Category	Recipient(s)	Result
2014	AWGIE Awards	Best Television Mini Series – Adaptation	Niki Aken & Felicity Packard	Won
2014	ACS State Awards	Best Telefeature/Series (SA/WA)	Geoffrey Hall	Won
2014	ACS State Awards	Best Entry (SA/WA)	Geoffrey Hall	Won
2014	Screen Producers Australia Awards	Telemovie or Mini Series Production	Screentime	Nominated
2014	ASSG Awards	Best Sound for a Television Drama Series	ANZAC Girls	Won
2015	AACTA Awards	Best Cinematography in Television	Geoffrey Hall	Nominated
2015	AACTA Awards	Best Sound in Television	Tom Heuzenroeder, Des Kenneally, Belinda Trimboli and Pete Best	Won
2015	AACTA Awards	Best Production Design in Television	Scott Bird	Nominated
2015	Logie Awards	Most Outstanding Mini-Series or Telemovie	ANZAC Girls	Nominated
2015	Logie Awards	Most Outstanding Newcomer	Brandon McClelland	Nominated
2015	Logie Awards	Most Popular New Talent	Laura Brent	Nominated
2015	Golden Nymph Awards	Best Miniseries	ANZAC Girls	Pending
2015	Golden Nymph Awards	Best Actress in a Miniseries	Georgia Flood	Pending

== See also ==
- Anzacs (TV series)
- The War That Changed Us, 4-episode ABC documentary first shown 19 August 2014
- Margaret Graham (matron)
