= Margaret Graham (matron) =

Australian nursing sister and army matron (1860–1942)

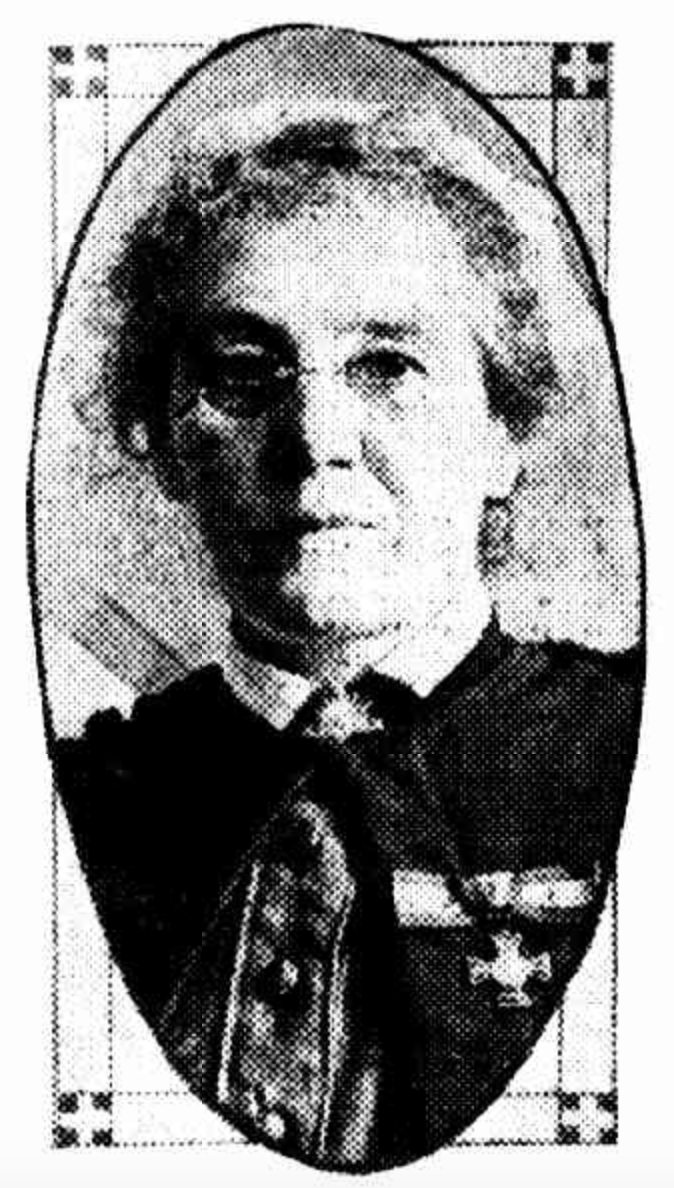
- Matron Margaret Graham, wearing her Royal Red Cross (1st class)
- Born: 15 February 1860; Carlisle, Cumberland, England
- Died: 4 July 1942 (aged 82); Carlisle, Cumberland, England
- Military career
- Allegiance: Australia
- Branch: Australian Army
- Service years: 1904–1918
- Rank: Matron
- Conflicts: First World War
- Awards: Royal Red Cross; Mentioned in Despatches
- Other work: Matron, Adelaide Hospital

Margaret Graham, RRC (15 February 1860 – 4 July 1942) was a nurse at the centre of a dispute dubbed the "Adelaide Hospital Row" at the (later Royal) Adelaide Hospital in 1894. She overcame this dubious distinction to become the highly regarded matron of the hospital, then one of the first Australian nursing matrons to serve at the front during the First World War.

== Early life and nursing career ==
Graham was born in Carlisle, Cumberland, England, on 15 February 1860, daughter of Margaret Graham (née Farrer) and her husband, house painter John Graham. Nothing further is known of her early life until she emigrated to South Australia in 1886 aboard the steam ship Austral, and on 2 April 1891 she enrolled as a probationary nurse at the Adelaide Hospital. In March 1894 she was appointed acting charge nurse in charge of Adelaide ward, and on 19 November was recommended by the hospital board for appointment as night charge nurse. This recommendation was not implemented.

Adelaide Hospital in the last decade of the 19th century was a dysfunctional workplace, beset with factional jealousies and professional rivalries, exacerbated by opponents of the government, who saw political benefit in keeping the hospital an "open sore". Graham became embroiled in controversy when nurse Ann Hannah Gordon, a sister of the Chief Secretary (later Sir) John Gordon, was promoted to Superintendent of Night Nurses, the second highest nursing rank. Many nurses thought the position should have gone to the more senior charge nurse Louise Hawkins, and that this was a case of favouritism. Six nurses, Graham among them, sent a petition to Premier Charles Kingston requesting an independent enquiry. A committee of twelve, including Drs. Edward Willis Way (who was instrumental in her promotion), Edward Charles Stirling and Anstey Giles, and Sir John Colton, met to consider the premier's request for a review of the appointment. This they endorsed on the grounds that Gordon's selection was on her leadership potential, not her nursing ability (an analogy with officers and "men" was made). Further, they regarded the letter as insulting and impertinent, and recommended suspension of the signatories. Under pressure, five of the nurses withdrew their support for Hawkins, but Graham refused to retract and was urged by her superior, Matron McLeod, to resign, and Dr. Way suggested she take a position at the Port Adelaide Hospital.

A Royal Commission found that Graham's protest was justified, but insulting terms had been used against the government and the hospital board, and if these were retracted Graham should be reinstated. The government dissolved the hospital board, and in the interval between their sacking and appointment of the new one, reinstated Graham. The medical superintendent Dr. Robert H. Perks, who had originally recommended Gordon's promotion to Way, resigned in September 1895 after Graham's return. Matron McLeod, a personal friend of Perks, also resigned. On 8 April 1896 the honorary medical staff and surgical staff resigned en masse, but continued attending to their patients until their contracts expired or replacements were appointed. Professional rivalry between surgeons (such as Leith Napier and Thomas Wilson Corbin) was so intense that the welfare of patients suffered.

Graham was appointed charge nurse and put in charge of Wyatt ward on 4 March 1896. She soon lived down her reputation as a rebel by dedication to her profession, and was appointed matron on 1 January 1898. When the Duchess of Cornwall, married to the future George V, visited the Adelaide Hospital on 10 July 1901, Graham served as her guide, showing her over Albert, Victoria, Alexandra, Alfred, Hope, and Flinders wards.

In November 1911, in an echo of 1895, three nurses were sacked by the board for complaining about the conduct of one Sister Dunstan, who was responsible to Graham. Subsequently 81 nurses refused to work under her; Graham informed the medical superintendent, Dr. C. T. C. de Crespigny, who individually ordered them to work in Victoria ward under Dunstan, and all but two probationers refused and were suspended. Graham smoothed the way for the nurses to return to work, advising them they would not be required to serve under Dunstan. Dunstan was an efficient and conscientious nurse and might have had better relations with her juniors had Graham been more accepting, tactful and accommodating.

Graham was an enthusiastic teacher but avoided paperwork wherever possible, leaving it for her night charge nurse. In April 1912 Dunstan was transferred to the Adelaide Destitute Asylum, where in 1913 she was at the centre of another staff dispute, but was again exonerated.

== Army service ==
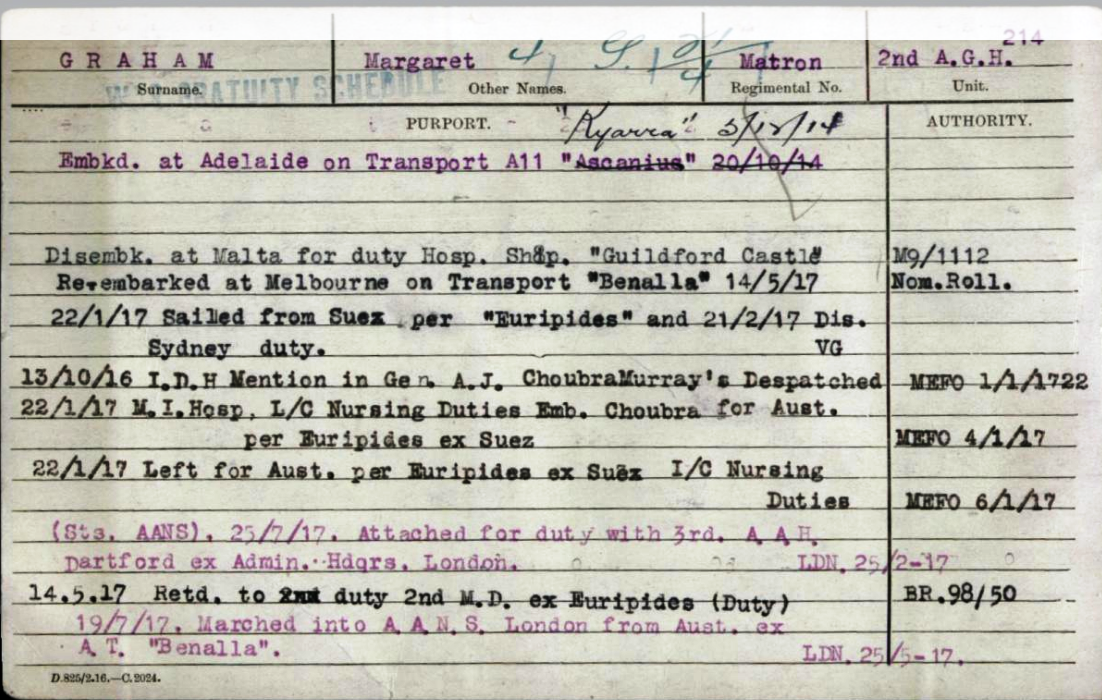
Army records originally had Graham aboard Ascanius, amended to 5 December embarkation aboard Kyarra.

In 1904 Graham enlisted with the Australian Army Nursing Service, a newly formed volunteer body of 108 (14 in SA) women nurses attached to the Australian Army Medical Corps, and was appointed the State's Lady Superintendent, with Mary Knowles as matron. Graham enlisted for active service with the Australian Imperial Force on 19 or 28 September 1914 (later army documents have 21 November); Sister Edith May Menhennett enlisted around the same time.

With some 2,000 troops Graham boarded Ascanius (aka Transport A11), which left Port Adelaide's Outer Harbor on 20 October 1914, arrived in Fremantle on 25 October, and in Colombo on 14 November, destined for Malta where she joined the hospital ship Guildford Castle.

An alternative history can be found in the biography of Nurse Frances Mary Deere, who enlisted 25 November 1914, travelled by train from Adelaide to Melbourne, joining the medical unit ship HMAT Kyarra (transport A55), which departed Melbourne on 5 December 1914 under a news blackout. Among the 20 nursing volunteers from Adelaide was Matron Margaret Graham. This accords with the handwritten correction on the record card pictured here and by Merrilyn Lincoln's assertion in the Australian Dictionary of Biography that Graham "embarked at Melbourne in December".
There is however no doubting newspaper reports of Graham boarding Ascanius which left Adelaide in October, and several Army records in Graham's file mention that ship. The Matron in charge of the nurses on the Kyarra was not Graham but the less senior Mary Knowles.

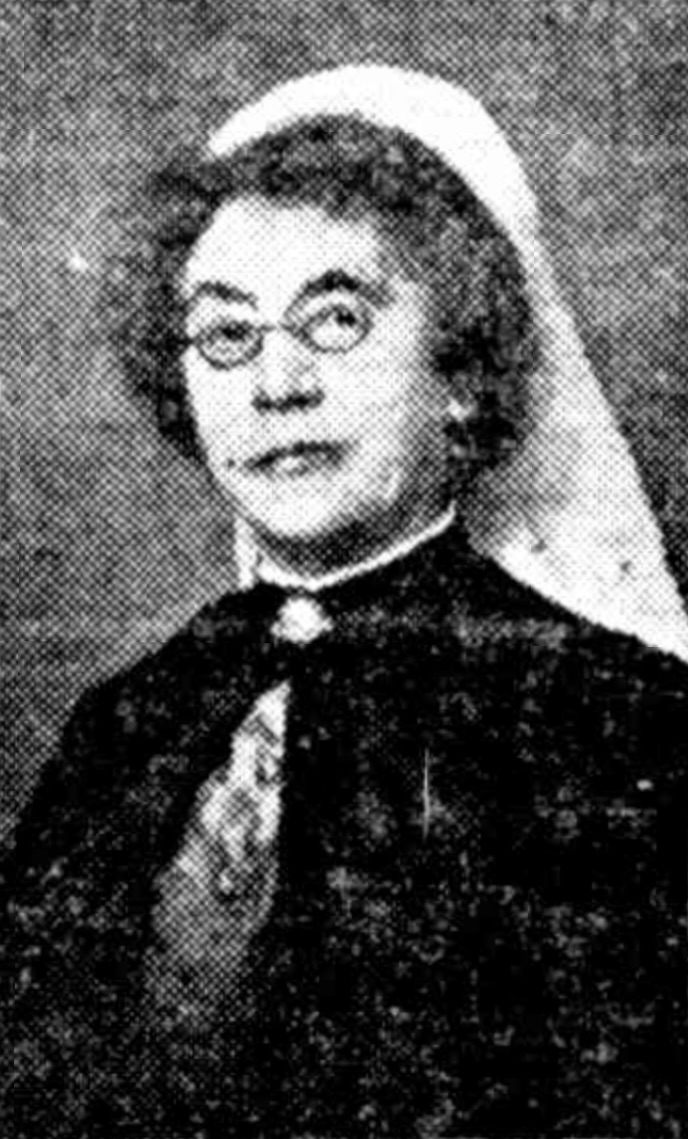
Matron Margaret Graham RRC

Graham reported for duty at No. 2 Australian General Hospital, Mena House, Heliopolis, on 27 April 1915, where Ellen Gould may have been matron, then on 4 May 1915 at No. 1 Australian General Hospital in Heliopolis, where she served 1915–16, also at the Red Cross hospital at Ghezireh and the military infectious diseases hospital at Choubra. She also worked on hospital transport ships carrying wounded from Gallipoli.

Graham returned to Melbourne on duty aboard hospital transport ship Euripides, leaving Suez on 22 January 1917. She reenlisted on 2 April 1917 and returned to London, reporting for duty at No. 3 Australian Auxiliary Hospital in Dartford, Kent, which specialised in war neurosis. Her last posting was No. 2 Australian General Hospital in England, before in January 1918 reporting to the medical offices at AIF Headquarters, London. She was a few months in the Glen Almond Convalescent Home for Sisters, then returned to Australia, embarking on the steamer Marathon (aka Transport A74) 15 April 1918, admitted to No. 7 Australian General Hospital on 28 June 1918, and was discharged as an invalid on 28 August 1918.

== Last years ==
Graham rejoined the Adelaide Hospital staff, then in 1919 was seconded to the Jubilee Exhibition Building on North Terrace, which had been requisitioned by the army as a convalescent hospital for military victims of the influenza pandemic, and was returned to public use on 1 December 1919. She resigned in 1920 and Eleanor Harrald was appointed Superintendent of Nurses in her place. On 27 January 1921 Graham boarded the Benalla for England where she died in Carlisle. She never married.

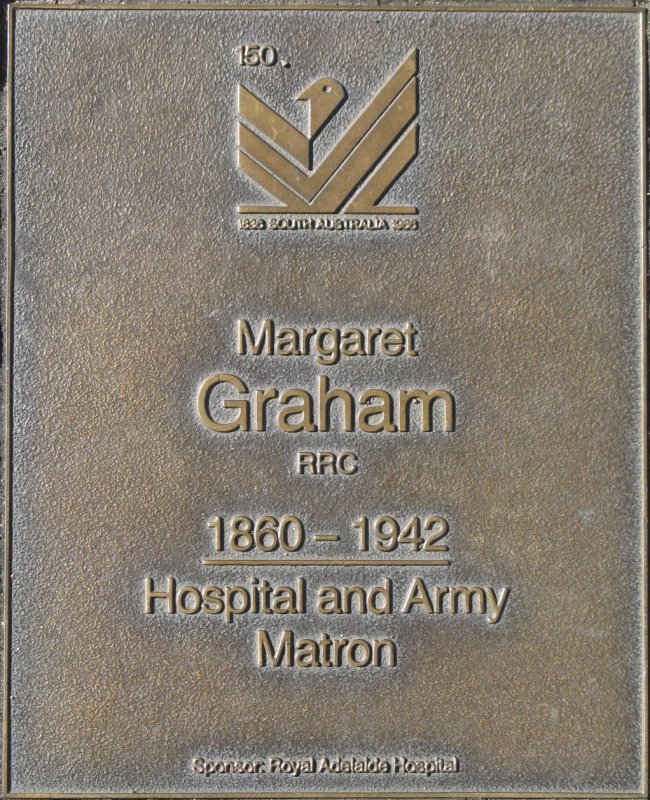
Jubilee 150 Walkway Plaque commemorating Margaret Graham

== Recognition ==
- She was Mentioned in Despatches on 13 October 1916 by General Archibald Murray.
- In December 1916 she was awarded the Royal Red Cross, 1st Class, so was entitled to the post-nominal letters RRC. The award was personally presented by King George V.
- She was in 1900 the founder of the SA branch of the Royal British Nurses' Association and awarded the title of Lady Consul by the parent body.
- She was awarded the Honorary Diploma of the Royal British Nurses' Association, a rare honour.
- The Adelaide Hospital Nurses' Quarters, a four-storey building at the former RAH site close to Frome Road, was built in 1911, later repurposed as an administrative centre and in 1954 named Margaret Graham Building for her.
- A plaque on North Terrace, Adelaide was laid in her honour as part of the Jubilee 150 Walkway.
