= The Other ANZACs =

ANZAC book

- Author: Peter Rees
- Language: English
- Subject: Military history, World War I
- Published: 2008 (Allen & Unwin)
- Publication place: Australia
- Media type: Print (hardback)
- Pages: 363
- ISBN: 9781741755497
- OCLC: 769489074

The Other ANZACs: Nurses at War 1914-1918 is a 2008 history book by Peter Rees. It is about the involvement of Australian and New Zealand nurses overseas during World War I, especially at Gallipoli and the Western Front. It is the basis for the 2014 ABC television series ANZAC Girls.

To tie in with the television series it was reissued in 2014 under the title ANZAC Girls.

== Contents ==
Author's note
Introduction
Gallipoli
The Marquette
The Western Front
Australian World War I nurses honour roll
New Zealand World War I nurses honour roll
Notes
Bibliogryaphy
Acknowledgements
Index

== Publication history ==
- 2008, The Other ANZACs: Nurses at War 1914-1918, Australia, Allen & Unwin ISBN 9781741755497
- 2014, Anzac Girls: The Extraordinary Story of World War One Nurses, Australia, Allen & Unwin ISBN 9781760110062

== Reception ==
A review on H-Net of The Other ANZACs called it "a wonderful book", and a reviewer for The Sydney Morning Herald found it a "profoundly moving book" that "tells an unforgettable story of the courage of Australian and New Zealand nurses in World War I."

It was shortlisted for the 2009 ACT Book of the Year.

The 2014 ABC television series ANZAC Girls is based on this book.
