= Ngāpuhi Nursing Sisters =

Volunteer nurses from New Zealand

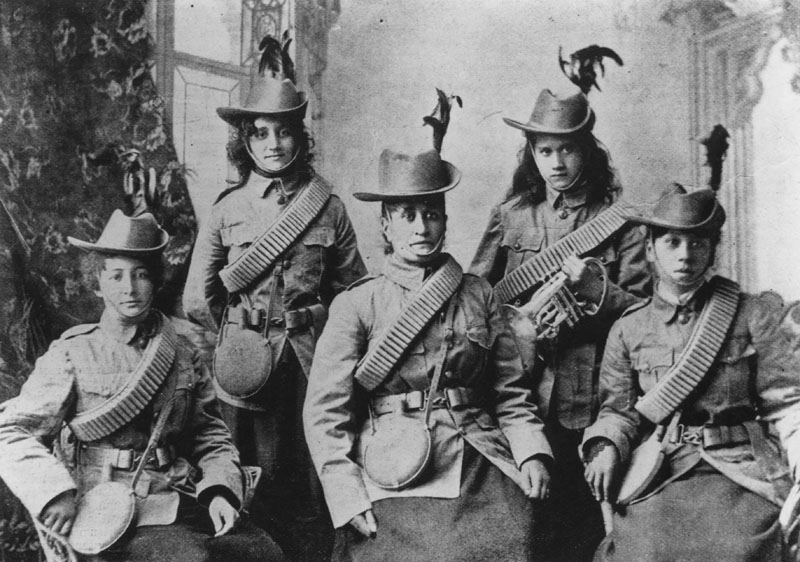
- The sisters in Whangarei, 1901
- Years active: 1901
- Known for: Community nursing

The Ngāpuhi Nursing Sisters were a group of Māori women, also known as the Ngāpuhi Nursing Sisters of Mercy, who worked as community nurses from 1901 in New Zealand.

== Establishment ==
The Ngāpuhi sisters were a group of five sisters; Louisa Kingi, A. Calkin, C. Calkin, Kohu Gertrude Waetford, and M. Kaire. They were from prominent families in Whangārei and descended from the chief Hongi Hika.

They officially formed in 1901 and were reported on by multiple newspapers of the time. One such report, from the New Zealand Herald, described the nurses as:

A society has been formed by a number of half-caste ladies who are the descendants of Ngapuhi chiefs of the North of New Zealand (writes the Herald's Whangarei correspondent). They call themselves the Ngapuhi sisters of mercy, and are qualifying themselves for nurses in the field, so that if our volunteers are called into active service they may be able to tend the sick and wounded. They are well mounted, and it is needless to say are all good horse-women. Their uniform is of khaki, the same as theNew Zealand volunteers, with skirt of the same colour.

— New Zealand Herald (10 May 1901)

While the sisters had extensive first aid and nursing experience, they were not formally trained. This meant they did not qualify for voluntary service in the South African War, as volunteer nurses were required to be between the age of 25 and 35, be in good health and to have completed 3 years of nursing service and training. This must have been paired with a certificate in civil hospital and a certificate of efficiency. They were also not eligible for entry on the first register of New Zealand nurses in 1901.

The Ngāpuhi sisters instead focused on nursing their own communities. During the turn of the century and into the 1910s, Māori communities were suffering disproportionately from infectious diseases like typhoid, tuberculosis and smallpox.

The sisters were skilled riders and travelled around Northland on horseback, tending to the sick. They also fundraised to support New Zealand troops in South Africa. While the South African War went on, the sisters trained and attended first aid workshops to prepare themselves for active service, if the need arose. They wore military-style uniforms and bullet bandoliers similar to what was worn by the contingent of New Zealand soldiers serving in South Africa.

== Legacy ==
The Ngāpuhi sisters are recognised to have challenged prevailing gender roles of their time as well as social restrictions placed on them due to their race. In 2025, a new nursing course was established at NorthTec, Puawānanga Tapuhi Māori (Bachelor of Nursing Māori) which integrates a mātauranga Māori approach, noted to have been inspired by the experiences of Māori in the Northland region, including the Ngāpuhi sisters.
