= Congress of Aboriginal and Torres Strait Islander Nurses and Midwives =

Australian peak advocacy body

The Congress of Aboriginal and Torres Strait Islander Nurses and Midwives (CATSINaM) is the peak national body that represents, advocates for, and supports Aboriginal and Torres Strait Islander nurses and midwives in Australia.

== History ==
CATSIN was founded in 1997 to formally represent Aboriginal and Torres Strait Islander nurses and midwives. A grant from the Office for Aboriginal and Torres Strait Islander Health (OATSIH) to the Australian Nursing and Midwifery Federation provided for the first national meeting of Aboriginal and Torres Strait Islander nurses in August 1997. Held in Sydney, the three-day meeting developed a series of recommendations for strategies and initiatives to advance the recruitment of Aboriginal and Torres Strait Islander people into nursing. In 1998, CATSIN was incorporated and until July 2012, led by its founding executive director, Sally Goold, a Wiradjuri woman. In 2016, CATSINaM established two new award categories to formally honour the outstanding achievements of members, and Sally Goold was the first inductee into the CATSINaM Hall of Fame.

From 2013, CATSINaM was led by CEO Janine Mohamed. After her resignation, Melanie Robinson was appointed in February 2019.

== Description ==
The organisation is located in Canberra, in the ACT.

CATSINaM advocates for improved health outcomes for Aboriginal and Torres Strait Islander people. It seeks to increase the number of practising Aboriginal and Torres Strait Islander nurses and midwives through improved recruitment and retention, and its professional development conference contributes to this strategy. The number of Aboriginal and Torres Strait Islander nurses and midwives grew from 2,246 or 0.79% of the Australian nursing and midwifery workforce in 2011, to 3,201 in 2016, or 1.02% of the nursing and midwifery workforce.

CATSINaM develops and promotes strategies to ensure the cultural safety of Aboriginal and Torres Strait Islander patients and health professionals, particularly for CATSINaM members. It also advocates for a national Aboriginal and Torres Strait Islander nursing and midwifery workforce strategy, cultural safety to be embedded into health practitioner legislation, and the development of a “health barometer” to measure race relations and cultural safety within the health system. In June 2017, CATSINaM secured a three-year funding agreement with the Australian Government Department of Health for the establishment of a "Leaders in Indigenous Nursing and Midwifery Education Network" or LINMEN.

CATSINaM provides policy advice to governments and a range of agencies, including universities, the Nursing and Midwifery Board of Australia, and the Australian Commission on Safety and Quality in Health Care, and works collaboratively with many Aboriginal and Torres Strait Islander organisations. In 2016 CATSINaM began coordinating the establishment of an International Alliance of First Nations Nurses and Midwives. Alliance Members include: Australia, New Zealand, Hawai`i, and Canada, with some other Pacific Island nations also included through the Pacific Nursing Section of the New Zealand Nurses Organisation.

== Structure ==
CATSINaM is a company limited by guarantee and operates within the Corporations Act 2001 as well as the CATSINaM Constitution registered with the Australian Securities and Investments Commission.

CATSINaM has an eight-member Aboriginal and or Torres Strait Islander Board of Directors who represent each state and territory, and must be currently registered as a nurse or midwife. They undertake a two-year tenure and have the option to be elected for a further two-year term to a maximum of four consecutive years. The Board elects CATSINaM's president for a two-year term and he/she may serve up to two terms. CATSINaM is primarily funded by the Australian Government's Department of Health, and also raises revenue through the provision of training services.
