= Ākenehi Hei =

New Zealand nurse and midwife

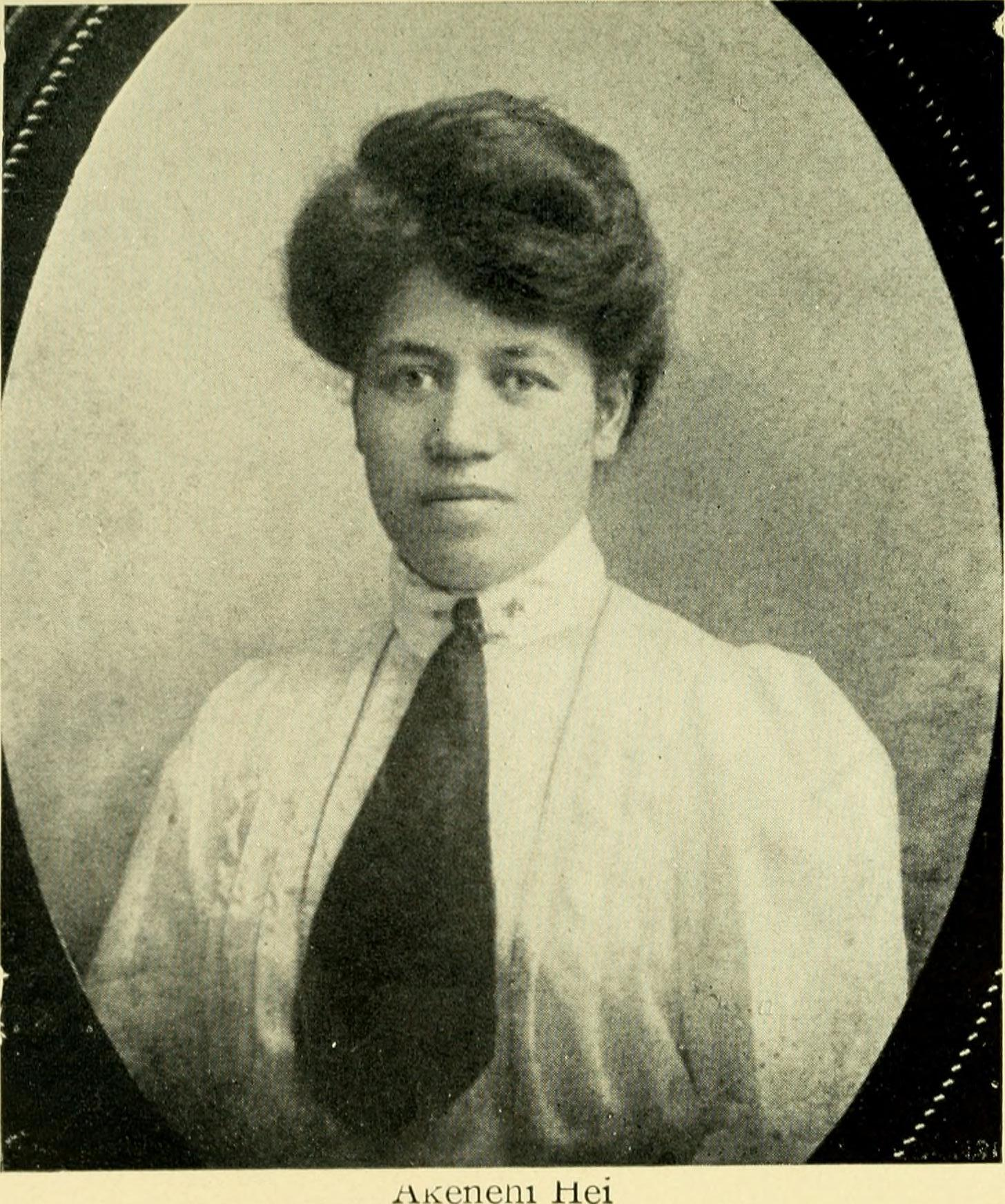
- Born: c. 1878; Te Kaha
- Died: 28 November 1910
- Education: St Joseph's Māori Girls' College
- Occupations: Nurse and midwife
- Medical career
- Institutions: Napier Hospital

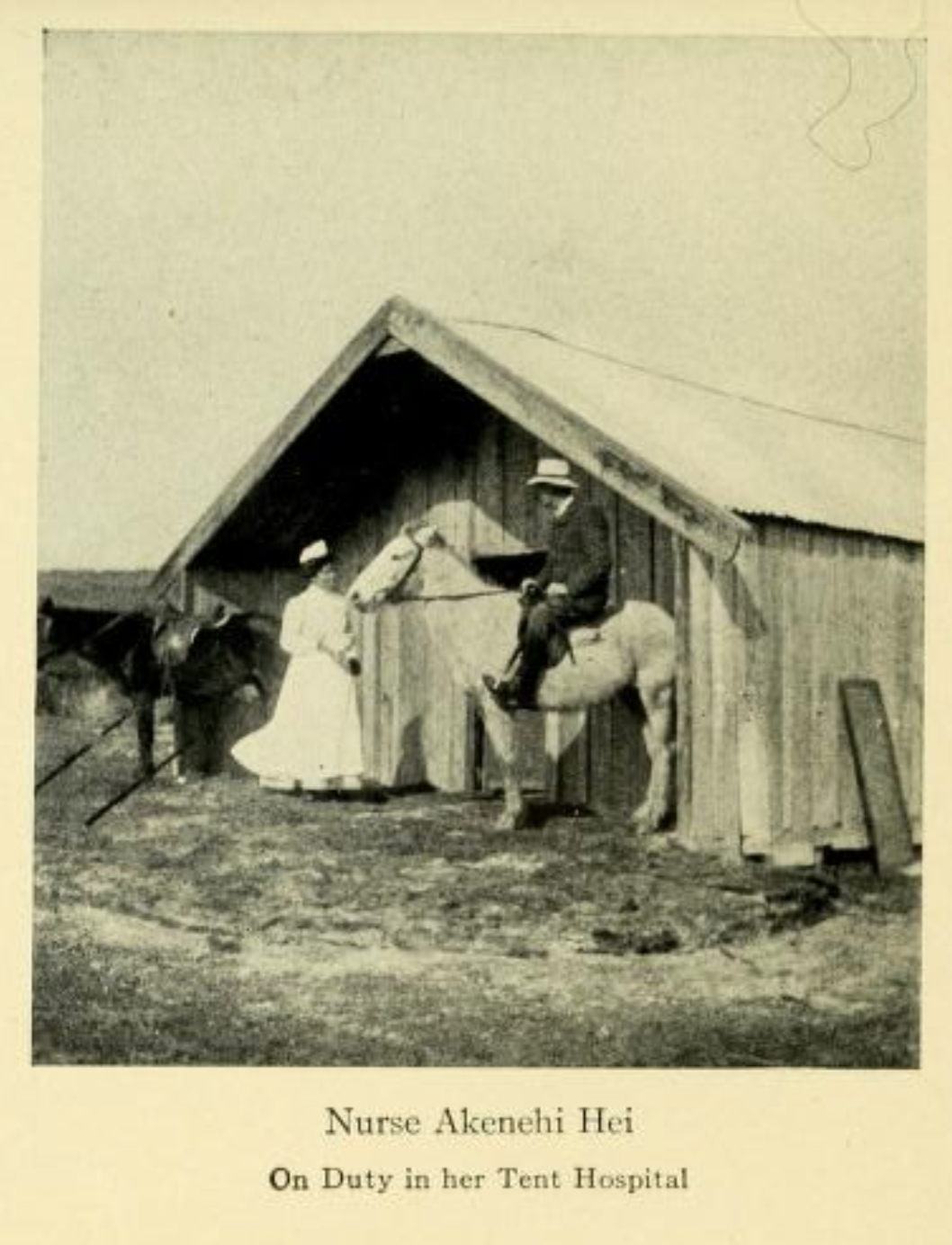
Hei and her makeshift hospital

Ākenehi Hei (c. 28 November 1878 –1910), sometimes called Agnes Hei, was a Māori district nurse and midwife in New Zealand. She was the first Māori to become a qualified nurse.

== Biography ==
Ākenehi Hei was born in Te Kaha, eastern Bay of Plenty, New Zealand, probably in 1877 or 1878. She identified with the Te Whakatōhea and Te Whānau-ā-Apanui iwi. She attended Te Kaha Native School, Ōpōtiki convent school, and St Joseph's Māori Girls' College in Napier. In 1901, she became an assistant nurse and dresser at Napier Hospital. She trained as a nurse and qualified in June 1908, being appointed a theatre sister at the hospital. Keen to become a district nurse, for which a midwifery qualification was required, she soon left for St Helens Hospital in Christchurch for midwifery training, qualifying in December 1908.

After a short time in private nursing, the Department of Public Health gave her a job providing nursing to Māori during a typhoid epidemic. She worked at various places around the North Island in 1909 and 1910. While based at New Plymouth, she also nursed at villages on the Whanganui River and was able to isolate patients in a makeshift hospital at Jerusalem.

== Death ==
Hei took leave to go to Gisborne to nurse her niece who was seriously ill with typhoid in July 1910. She was soon nursing a number of typhoid patients until she too caught the disease and died in Gisborne Hospital on 28 November 1910. In the January 1911 edition of the New Zealand Nursing Journal, Kai Tiaki, her death was reported in Kai Tiaki: the journal of the nurses of New Zealand on1 January 1911:

"The sad news of the death of Nurse Akenehi Hui on 28th November, was a great shock to her many friends. She was only a short time ill, having succumbed to typhoid fever after being laid up for a fortnight...... The death of their devoted nurse is a most serious loss to her people. She was the first of the Maori nurses to qualify in both general and midwifery nursing. Her ideals were of the highest order, and she looked forward to elevating the general conditional and mode of living for the Maori race."

== Legacy ==
Ākenehi Hei is widely noted as the first Māori woman to become a qualified nurse, paving the way for the profession of nursing in Aotearoa New Zealand. She incorporated both Māori and non-Māori practices and values in her nursing, and remains a pioneer in New Zealand nursing.
