= Norval Dooley =

Australian Army officer

Norval Henry Dooley
- Norval Dooley 1917
- Born: 3 October 1893; Bendigo, Victoria
- Died: 1978; Melbourne
- Military career
- Allegiance: Australia
- Branch: Australian Army
- Service years: 1915–1931; 1940–1943
- Rank: Captain
- Nickname: "Pat"
- Conflicts: First World War; Second World War

Norval Henry "Pat" Dooley (3 October 1893 – 1978) was an Australian Army officer and leading solicitor. His service at Gallipoli and in France, and his courtship of nurse Olive Haynes was portrayed in the 2014 ABC Television miniseries ANZAC Girls.

== Early life ==
Dooley was born in Bendigo, but his parents, Mr and Mrs W.H. Dooley, later moved the family, which included a sister, Beryl, to Ivanhoe, Victoria. Dooley attended the University of Melbourne, where he studied law. In 1914, in his third year, Dooley entered residence at Trinity College, where he was a successful athlete. He competed regularly in walking events for the Melbourne University Athletics Club (MUAC), and in 1917, one newspaper described him as "the well-known and popular M.U.A.C. walker". In 1914, he was selected for the One Mile Walk for the Victorian team to compete at the Australasian Athletics Championships. A year later, when the Melbourne University Athletic Club Championships were run in May 1915, it was noted that:

Secretarial cares sat lightly on Messrs. N.H. Dooley and W.R. Jewell. Each was prominent in the racing, and secured a championship. The former won the mile walk in good time, and has also to be congratulated on recently securing the degree of Bachelor of Laws and Literature.

Dooley and his teammate P.M. Hamilton were sent as University delegates to the Victorian Amateur Athletics Association annual meeting in March, to present a resolution passed by the University Sports Union in February 1915 that during the War, "Sports should not be suspended, but should be played for competitive exercise only; and … no premiership or pennant honors should be awarded during the 1916 season".

== War service ==
When Dooley graduated in May 1915, he had been intending on studying theology at the Trinity College Theological School, possibly with a view to ordination. However, having earlier been rejected for war service due to his poor eyesight (he wore spectacles his whole life), on 7 July 1915 he was re-examined and passed as fit for service. His eyesight is perhaps why he was not originally given duties on the front line. He enlisted as a private in the Australian Army Medical Corps, and was assigned to the No. 2 Australian Casualty Clearing Station, which dealt with the wounded from the Gallipoli Campaign.

There he met Olive Lilian Creswell Haynes, an Australian nurse attached to the No. 2 Australian Stationary Hospital on Lemnos. She was the daughter of the Revd J.C. Haynes, sometime chaplain at St Peter's College, Adelaide. In November 1917, now serving in France, Dooley was wounded in action, receiving a gunshot to the chest and being evacuated to England. They were married one month later, on 11 December 1917, at St Peter le Bailey, Oxford. The story of their courtship and service during the First World War is told in ANZAC Girls, where Dooley is played by Brandon McClelland and Haynes by Anna McGahan. The six-part series is based on the true stories of nurses serving at Gallipoli and the Western Front during the war, and makes use of the diaries and letters of Sister Haynes, published in 1991.

== Post-war life ==
The couple survived the war and, after returning to Melbourne, had seven children, one of whom had Down syndrome. Olive was involved in establishing a school for the developmentally disabled at Ivanhoe. Dooley continued his service with the armed forces, being promoted to captain in October 1920, and being appointed Staff Officer, 3rd Grade, Intelligence Section, General Staff. He relinquished this in 1931, but in 1940 volunteered again for service and was promoted to Staff Captain in October 1940 with the Australian Army Legal Department. He later settled to a successful legal practice in Queen Street, and was for many years legal adviser to the Electricity Commission. During the 1940s, he was honorary treasurer of the Melbourne Legacy Club.
