= Elouera House =

- Location within New South Wales Location within Australia
- 34.4248°S 150.8839°E
- Location: Darling Street, Wollongong, City of Wollongong, New South Wales, Australia

History
- Built: 1937–1939

Site notes
- Architect: GA Cobden Parkes( NSW Government architect)
- Owner: NSW Department of Health

New South Wales Heritage Register
- Official name: Wollongong Hospital Nurses Home; Nurses home – Wollongong Hospital; Eloura House
- Type: state heritage (built)
- Designated: 2 April 1999
- Reference no.: 836
- Type: Nurses' Home
- Category: Health Services

Elouera House is a heritage-listed former nurses' home in the central business district of Wollongong, New South Wales, Australia. The property, located on Darling Street, was designed by Cobden Parkes in his capacity as New South Wales Government Architect and built in 1937–39. It is also known as Wollongong Hospital Nurses Home and Eloura House. It was added to the New South Wales State Heritage Register on 2 April 1999.

== History ==
It was opened in April 1939 by Acting Minister for Health Athol Richardson and named "Elouera" for the 'native name' for the Illawarra. The building had 69 rooms, with a separate room for every member of the nursing staff, spacious balconies, a spacious recreation room and "all necessary sitting rooms, studies, etc." It had been first announced in February 1937, with construction starting in November that year; while completed at its 1939 opening, it was still not furnished at that time. It was built by contractors Hogden Bros at a cost of approximately £22,000, financed on a 50-50 arrangement between the state government and hospital, which took out a loan to cover the cost.

By 1940, the nurses' home was found to be not big enough, with 21 more rooms needed. It was subsequently extended in 1941.

In 2011, it was being used for obstetrics, gynecology and administration, although at that time it had fallen into a state of disrepair. In that year, the Wollongong Hospital released plans for an $86 million expansion of the hospital. It proposed to demolish the 1941 extension on the building's western side to make way for a new six-storey, 120-bed hospital wing. The Heritage Council responded that retention of the wing was "desirable in view of its heritage significance", but noted the arguments that it was in a poor state and was not part of the original building. The state planning department subsequently agreed that it would not have a significant heritage impact and approved the demolition of the wing. It was demolished by March 2013.

== Description ==
Elouera House is a three-storey nurses' home with round ended cantilevered balconies. It is built in the Inter War Functionalist style, with cream facing bricks, Marseilles pattern semi-glazed terracotta tiles and reinforced concrete slab. It is the oldest structure on the Wollongong Hospital site.

It was reported to be in fair condition as at 18 December 2000. By 2011-12, it was described as "dilapidated", with many rooms unable to be occupied due to the state of internal disrepair.

== Heritage listing ==
Wollongong Hospital Nurses Home was listed on the New South Wales State Heritage Register on 2 April 1999.
