= Nursing in New Zealand =

Nursing in New Zealand is a specialist career with advanced educational requirements. Since the 19th century, the profession has evolved from on-the-job training in hospitals to a degree-level profession studied in technical institutes and universities. Due to New Zealand's geographic and geopolitical position, the country's nursing profession is both the subject of brain drain to larger nations and the recipient of brain drain from others.

== History ==
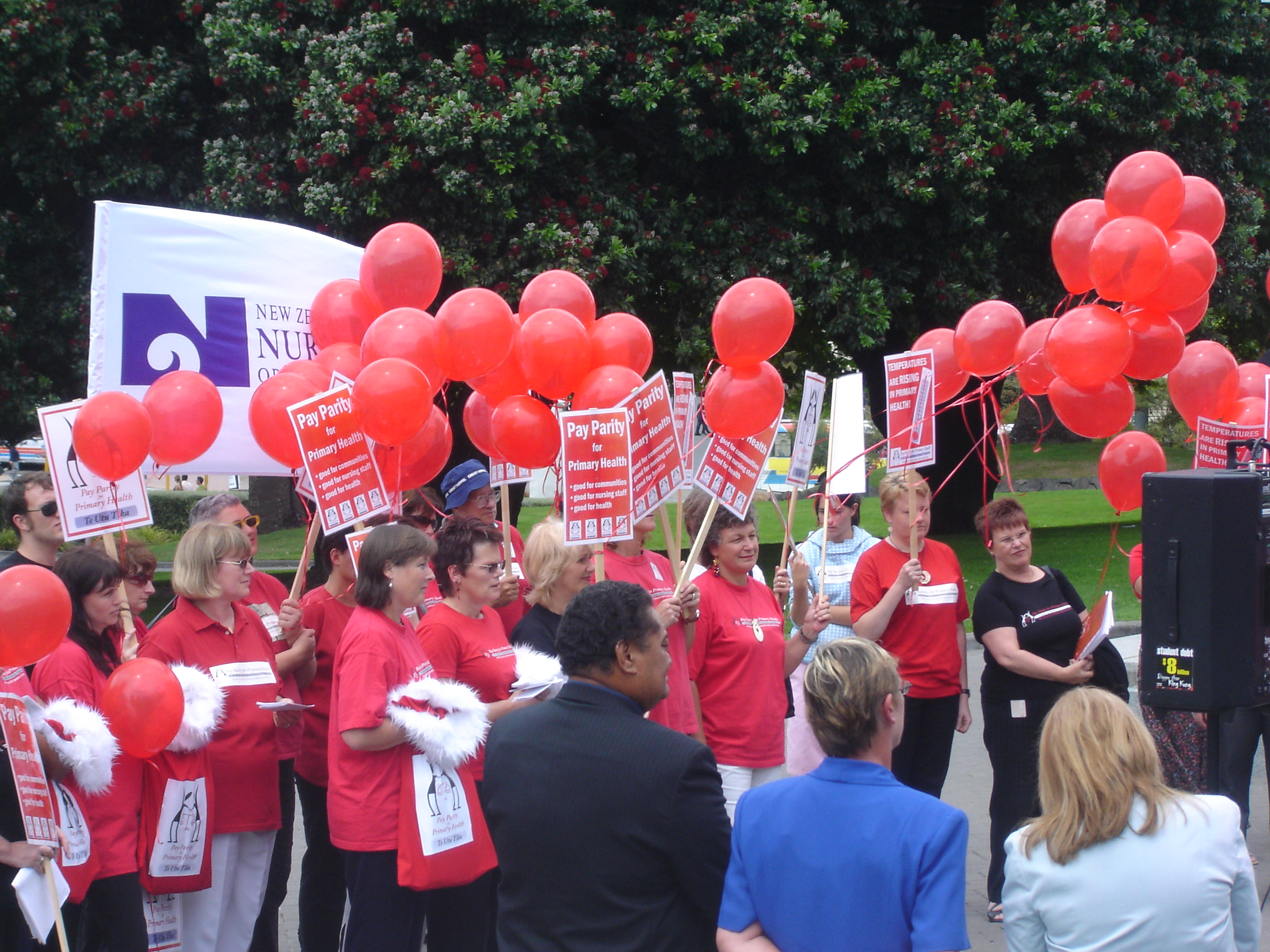
Members of the New Zealand Nurses Organisation on the steps of Parliament House seeking pay parity for the primary health care sector

Originally doctors within New Zealand worked independently with a user pays system. Public hospitals were designed to be used by patients that could not afford to be in the private health care system. For some people there was also home visits made by their personal doctor, however along with this came the cost that some could ill afford. Hence the establishment of the public hospital system. While some areas managed to fund the facilities, others simply could not due to lack of public support. By the 1880s the government stepped in and funded all hospitals. New Zealand originally had nurse education as a part of the hospital system, but, as early as the 1900s, post registration and post graduate programs of study for nurses were in existence. Reforms in the 1970s disestablished the original hospital-based schools and moved these into the tertiary education sector, namely polytechnics and universities. Within the hospital system were an array of titles and levels, which often focused upon clinical specialty rather than generic nursing knowledge. The first hospital was built in Auckland in the year 1845; Wellington, 1846; Christchurch, 1862; Dunedin, 1851.

== Education ==
Today all nurses in New Zealand are educated to degree level via a three-year, two semesters per annum, program, with an approximate 50/50 mix of theory to practice. All current students graduate as a RNZcmpN Registered New Zealand comprehensive Nurse. Legislation exists keeping the number of schools to no more than 21, although some schools run courses in more than one geographical location. Recently, attempts were made to reintroduce the title enrolled nurse with this causing some disagreement between trade unions, the registering body, and health providers.

== Legal regulation ==
All nurses in New Zealand are expected to maintain both professional knowledge and clinical competence in order to receive an annual practicing certificate from the Nursing Council of New Zealand (NCNZ). Recent legislation (the 2003 Health Practitioners Competency Assurance Act) sets standards for both scope of practice and requirements in terms of ongoing development.

Similarly the NCNZ caused minor controversy when they gave the title nurse practitioner, thus preventing those with the title from using it. As a nurse practitioner, the nurse must undertake an approved course of study and present a portfolio of evidence to NCNZ for approval. There are now approximately 20 NPs in New Zealand with a smaller number of granted prescribing rights.

== Ongoing issues ==
New Zealand's nursing profession has historically been plagued by brain drain, particularly to Australia. The larger population and higher salaries offered by the profession in Australia tempt many migrants, although nurses who remained in New Zealand caution their peers about a weaker social safety net and difficulty retaining personal and professional connections in New Zealand. This is expected to accentuate after the end of the COVID-19 pandemic leads to borders reopening between Australia and New Zealand, although the picture is complicated by the possibility of two-way brain drain, with skilled workers (including nurses) moving between each nation. New Zealand's nursing profession is also the beneficiary of brain drain from Pacific Island nations, with more Samoa, Fiji, and Tonga-born nurses and midwives working in Australia and New Zealand than in their home countries.

== See also ==
- Nursing in Australia
- Timeline of nursing history in Australia and New Zealand
