= Nellie Gould =

Australian nurse (1860–1941)

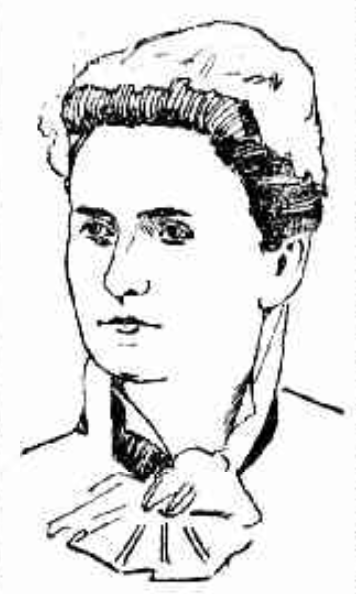
- Sketch of Matron Ellen Gould in 1900
- Born: 29 March 1860; Aberystruth, Wales
- Died: 19 July 1941 (aged 81); Neutral Bay, New South Wales, Australia
- Military career
- Allegiance: Colony of New South Wales; Australia
- Branch: New South Wales Military Forces; Australian Army
- Service years: 1899–1919
- Rank: Matron
- Units: 2nd New South Wales Army Medical Corps Contingent; Australian Army Nursing Service
- Conflicts: Second Boer War; First World War
- Awards: Royal Red Cross

Ellen Julia Gould, RRC (29 March 1860 – 19 July 1941) was a Welsh-born Australian nurse. She was the first lady superintendent of the Army Nursing Service Reserve, attached to the New South Wales Army Medical Corps, from 1899, and served in this role during the Second Boer War. She and Sister Julia Bligh Johnston operated Ermelo Private Hospital at Newtown, Sydney, for several years.

Gould served in the First World War as matron of No. 2 Australian General Hospital, both in Egypt and in France. She was awarded a Royal Red Cross in 1916 and posthumously inducted onto the Victorian Honour Roll of Women in 2001.

Gould was played by Rhondda Findleton in the 2014 miniseries ANZAC Girls.
