= Cultural safety =

Type of nursing practice

Cultural safety is the effective nursing practice of nursing a person or family from another culture; it is determined by that person or family. It developed in New Zealand, with origins in nursing education. An unsafe cultural practice is defined as an action which demeans the cultural identity of a particular person or family.

Cultural safety has four separate principles:

1. to improve health status and well-being
2. to improve the delivery of health services
3. to focus on the differences among the people who are being treated, and to accept those differences
4. to focus on understanding the power of health services and on how health care impacts individuals and families

== Origin ==
Cultural Safety has its origins in the field of nursing education. The concept originated at a nursing leadership hui in 1989 after concerns were raised by Māori nursing students about the safety of Māori students in monocultural nursing schools and of Māori intellectual property when taught by tauiwi.

== Definition ==
Cultural safety is met through actions which recognise, respect, and nurture the unique cultural identity of a patient. Effective practice for a person from another culture is determined by that person or family. Culture includes, but is not restricted to, age or generation; gender; sexual orientation; occupation and socioeconomic status; ethnic origin or migrant experience; religious or spiritual beliefs; and/or ability. Unsafe cultural practice comprises any action which diminishes, demeans or dis-empowers the cultural identity and wellbeing of an individual.

== Principle 1 ==
Cultural safety aims to improve the health status and wellbeing of New Zealanders and applies to all relationships through: 1) an emphasis on health gains and positive health and wellbeing outcomes; 2) acknowledging the beliefs and practices of those who differ from them. For example, this may be by: age or generation, gender, sexual orientation, occupation and socioeconomic status, ethnic origin or migrant experience, religious or spiritual belief, disability

== Principle 2 ==
Cultural safety aims to enhance the delivery of health services through a culturally safe workforce by: 1) identifying the power relationship between the service provider and the people who use the service. The health care provider accepts and works alongside others after undergoing a careful process of institutional and personal analysis of power relationships; 2) empowering the users of the service. People should be able to express degrees of perceived risk or safety. For example, someone who feels unsafe may not be able to take full advantage of a service offered and may subsequently require more intrusive and serious intervention; 3) preparing health care providers to understand the diversity within their own cultural reality and the impact of that on any person who differs in any way from themselves; 4) applying social science concepts that underpin the practice of health care. Health care practice is more than carrying out tasks. It is about relating and responding effectively to people with diverse needs and strengths in a way that the people who use the service can define as safe.

== Principle 3 ==
Cultural safety is broad in its application: 1) recognising inequalities within health care, education, employment and societal interactions that represent the microcosm of inequalities in health, education, employment and society that have prevailed within our nation; 2) addressing the cause and effect relationship of history, political, social, and employment status, housing, education, gender and personal experience upon people who use psychological services; 3) accepting the legitimacy of difference and diversity in human behaviour and social structure; 4) accepting that the attitudes and beliefs, policies and practices of psychological service providers can act as barriers to service access; 5) concerning quality improvement in service delivery and consumer rights.

== Principle 4 ==
Cultural safety has a close focus on: 1) understanding the impact of the health care provided as a bearer of his/her own culture, history, attitudes and life experiences and the response other people make to these factors; 2) challenging health care providers to examine their practice carefully, recognising the power relationship in health care institutions is biased toward the provider of the service; 3) balancing the power relationships in the practices of health care so that every consumer receives an effective service; 4) preparing health care providers to resolve any tension between the culture of the health care institution, the culture on which health care theory and practice has traditionally been based, and the people using the services; 5) understanding that such power imbalances can be examined, negotiated and changed to provide equitable, effective, efficient and acceptable service delivery, which minimises risk to people who might otherwise be alienated from the service; 6) an understanding of self, the rights of others and legitimacy of difference should provide the psychologists with the skills to work with all people who are different from them.

== Introduction into Nursing schools ==
Standards for the registration of nurses in all scopes of practice require the content of theory and practice related experience in nursing programmes to include cultural safety, the Treaty of Waitangi and Māori health. Irihapeti Ramsden said the woeful state of Maori health was a driving force for cultural safety's introduction into New Zealand's nursing schools. Māori had higher rates of asthma, heart disease, diabetes, obesity, cot death, ear infection leading to deafness and traffic accident injury involving alcohol and leading to death. Also, they had lower rates of immunisation, earned less and lived five to seven years less than non-Māori.

== Development ==
The concept developed in New Zealand by nurses working with Māori that moves beyond the traditional concept of cultural sensitivity (being tolerant or accepting of difference) to analysing power imbalances, institutional discrimination, colonisation and relationships with colonisers. It develops the idea that to provide quality care for people from different ethnicities than the mainstream, health care providers must embrace the skill of self-reflection as a means to advancing a therapeutic encounter and provide care congruent with the knowledge that cultural values and norms of the patient are different from his/her own.

== Strengths ==
According to Brascoupé (2009) "the long-term value of the concept of cultural safety as a tool for cultural regeneration is hard to assess and depends on the integrity of the processes that underlie the concept of cultural safety". Most cultural safety research has been completed in New Zealand and Australia's health-care field, but the statistical evidence of the benefits of cultural safety is lacking, and other evidence is largely qualitative and anecdotal.

== Controversies ==
Irihapeti Ramsden, the architect of cultural safety, stated that cultural safety training is too skewed toward Māori studies in many nursing courses and ignores the cultures of other minorities.

A number of controversies during the mid 1990s affected the concept of cultural safety in New Zealand. Critics claimed that nursing students were afraid to speak out about the excesses of cultural safety on their nursing degrees, presumably for concerns about failing their course after not meeting cultural safety requirements. Student nurse Anna Penn said she had been "bounced out" of her nursing course for being branded culturally unsafe by the polytechnic's Māori kaumatua, the late Hohua Tutengaehe, after she questioned the denial of her right as a woman to speak on a Marae. She also challenged a tutor's claim that pre-European Māori had printing presses which were thrown into the sea by white colonials. Penn subsequently attended a nursing course in Queensland, Australia, and is now a registered nurse in New Zealand. In addition, Ex Waikato Polytechnic nursing tutor Brian Stabb said he had been sacked for being "culturally unsafe". Mr Stabb wrote that "I have experienced it as a racial judgement which carries all the stigmas of the most rabid forms of racism. Further. it seems this label can be handed out willy nilly with little or no accountability. The rationale I have been offered is that, as tangata whenua, Maori have the unassailable right to make such judgements and are accountable only to other tangata whenua" (Māori people of the land).

Additionally, former students and a former tutor on the Wanganui Polytechnic social work course have alleged intimidation and threats by tutors and students if they attempted to question the course's promotion of "radical" Māori views. They have claimed, among other things, that separate classes were held for Māori and "tauiwi" (foreigners); that Māori students who failed last year were accepted into the second year; that Māori students were allowed to start the course one week before pakeha (typically non-Māori and born in New Zealand) students because, in the words of a tutor, they had been disadvantaged all their lives and needed that extra week; that students were made to wear signs saying "Pakaitore (Moutoa Gardens) is Māori land" during the course's selection process and risked exclusion if they refused; and that a tutor who had no teaching qualifications spent most of the class time sitting outside smoking and reading the newspaper.

== Criticism ==
Critics have claimed that cultural safety is based on fanciful quasi-psychological subjects which has resulted in an abandonment of rigorous and theoretical task-based nursing. Public opposition to cultural safety during the 1990s led to a Parliamentary Select Committee inquiry into its teaching, whilst a simultaneous review was carried out by the NZ Nursing Council. After the review the NZ Nursing Council revised the guidelines for cultural safety in Nursing and Midwifery Education to placate public concern that cultural safety privileged Māori.

Cultural safety has been criticised for lacking a clear and comprehensive practice framework that is easily translated by, and responsive to, both culturally diverse health care providers and equally diverse health care recipients.
