= Drumhead court-martial =

Court-martial held in the field to hear urgent charges of offences committed in action

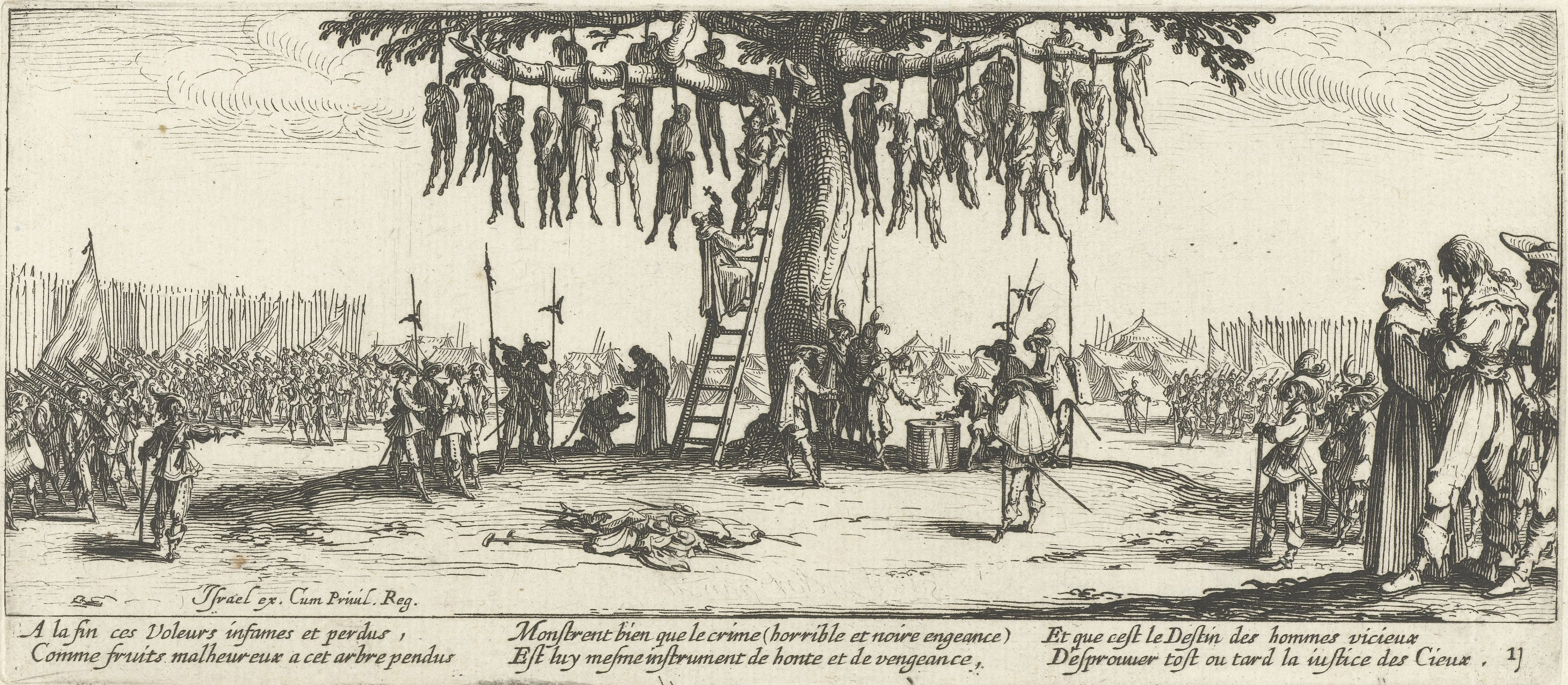
The Hanging from Callot's Great Miseries of War shows a drum being used as an improvised table at an execution, albeit as a platform for throwing dice.

A drumhead court-martial is a court-martial held in the field to render summary justice for offenses committed in action. The term is said to originate from drums used as improvised tables and drumheads as writing surfaces at fast-track military trials and executions.

== Origins ==
The earliest recorded usage is in an English memoir of the Peninsular War (1807). The term sometimes has connotations of summary justice, with an implied lack of judicial impartiality, as noted in the transcripts of the trial at Nuremberg of Josef Bühler.

According to Sir Arthur Wynne Morgan Bryant, such courts-martial have ordered lashings or hangings to punish soldiers (and their officers) who were cowardly, disobedient, or, conversely, acted rashly; and especially as a discouragement to drunkenness. It is also used as a reference to a kangaroo court in its derogatory form.

== World War II ==
=== Nazi Germany ===
From 1934, every division of the Reichswehr had a court martial. After the occupation of Poland, the Oberkommando des Heeres wished to introduce a system which allowed speedy trials to be performed, as it was believed that a fast process would be a more effective deterrent. In November 1939 a law was passed which permitted drumhead trials if it was deemed necessary during warfare. Every commander of a regiment could either decide to inform the court martial of his division, or he could convene a drumhead trial when somebody was accused of a crime. The decision of a drumhead trial could be executed immediately. With the beginning of the year 1944 the high command formed a special police, the "High command Feldjägerkorps", which were in command of special drumhead trials named fliegende Standgerichte, composed of motorized judges.

During the last two months of World War II, Adolf Hitler authorized the use of Fliegendes Sonder-Standgericht ("flying special court martial" or "flying special drumhead"), mobile courts-martial used by the German armed forces. The use of "flying" refers to their mobility and may also refer to the earlier "flying courts martial" held in Italian Libya. Italian military judges were flown by aircraft to the location of captured rebels, where the rebels were tried in a court martial shortly after capture.

An example of this was the summary trial of five officers found guilty of failing to prevent the Western Allies from capturing the Ludendorff Bridge during the Battle of Remagen on 7 March 1945. On a direct order from Hitler, Generalleutnant Rudolf Hübner tried Major Hans Scheller, Captain Willi Bratge, Capt. Karl Friesenhahn, Lt. Karl Heinz Peters, Maj. Herbert Strobel and Maj. August Kraft. Hübner, who had no legal experience, acted as both prosecutor and judge. He conducted extremely brief show trials during which he harangued the defendants for their alleged command failures, and then pronounced sentence. All of the officers were sentenced to death except for Friesenhahn, who had unsuccessfully attempted to detonate explosive charges wired to the bridge before later being captured by Allied forces. Other than Bratge (who had been captured along with Friesenhahn), the convicted officers were taken to nearby woods within 24 hours, executed with a shot to the back of the neck, and buried where they fell.

After the failed plot to assassinate Hitler in July 1944, General Friedrich Fromm, after capturing the conspirators, hosted an impromptu court martial sentencing the lead conspirators to death by firing squad. Dietrich Bonhoeffer, accused of association with the assassination plot, was similarly tried and executed.

After Admiral Wilhelm Canaris, head of the Abwehr, the German military intelligence service, was suspected of involvement in the 20 July Plot to assassinate Hitler, Hitler authorised Heinrich Himmler to have Canaris tried and sentenced to death by a drumhead court-martial.

=== Imperial Japan ===
The Enemy Airmen's Act contributed to the deaths of hundreds of Allied airmen throughout WWII in the Pacific Theater. An estimated 132 Allied airmen shot down during the bombing campaign against Japan in 1944–1945 were summarily executed after short kangaroo trials or drumhead courts-martial.

== In popular culture ==
The Star Trek: The Next Generation episode "The Drumhead" (1991) centers upon a Starfleet internal investigation into an explosion on board the Enterprise-D, initially assumed to be sabotage, which gradually devolves into what Captain Jean-Luc Picard likens to a "drumhead trial".

In the Hermann Melville novella, Billy Budd, Sailor, a drumhead court is convened after likeable Billy accidentally kills the Master at Arms aboard a British warship during wartime. The events of the story are set in 1797.
