= Tinta Massacre Site =

- U.S. National Register of Historic Places
- Location within Guam
- Location: Espinosa Avenue
- Nearest city: Merizo, Guam
- Coordinates: 13°15′49″N 144°40′40″E
- Area: 0.5 acres (0.20 ha)
- Built: 1944
- NRHP reference No.: 91001720
- Added to NRHP: November 26, 1991

The Tinta Massacre Site, near Merizo, Guam, has significance from 1944. Also known as Tinta (66-06-1223), it was listed on the National Register of Historic Places in 1991. The listing included one contributing site and one contributing object.

It is the location of a massacre of civilians by Japanese troops on July 15, 1944, six days before the island was liberated, in World War II. Thirty men and women from the village of Merizo were gathered; sixteen were killed and the others were left for dead. One of those killed was Mrs. Maria L. Mesa, "a prominent pre-war educator". In 1991, the site was marked by a cross.

== See also ==
- Faha Massacre Site, nearby, also NRHP-listed
- https://www.guampedia.com/war-atrocities-tinta-and-faha-massacres/
