= Enemy Airmen's Act =

1942 Japanese law

The Enemy Airmen's Act was a law passed by Imperial Japan on 13 August 1942 which stated that Allied airmen participating in bombing raids against Japanese-held territory would be treated as "violators of the law of war" and subject to trial and punishment if captured by Japanese forces. This law contributed to the deaths of hundreds of Allied airmen throughout the Pacific and Asian theaters of World War II. Shortly after World War II, Japanese officers who carried out show trials and illegal executions under the Enemy Airmen's Act were found guilty of war crimes.

== Background ==
=== Doolittle Raid ===
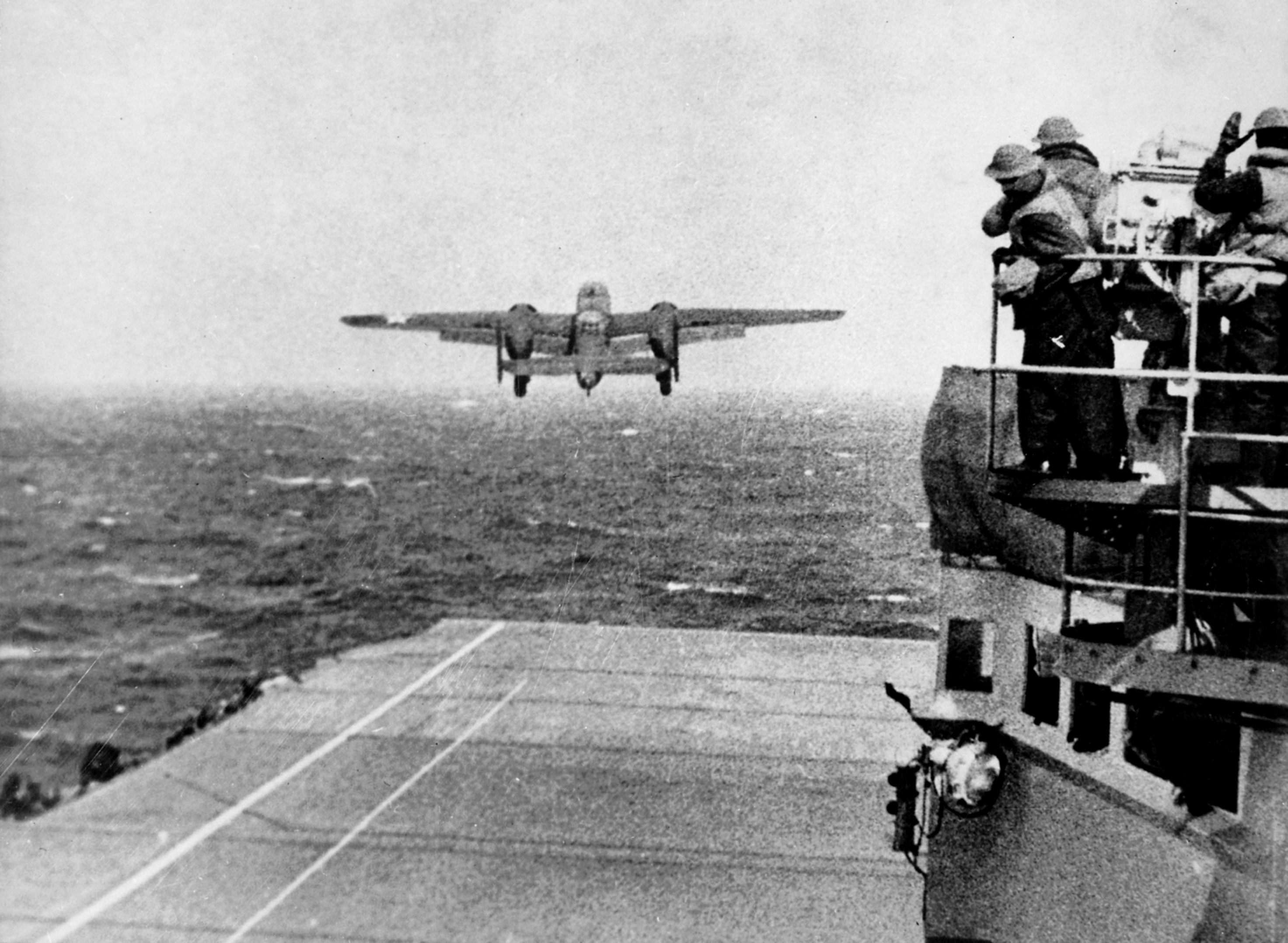
A B-25 taking off from Hornet on 18 April 1942 for the first-ever raid on Japan.

In an operation conducted primarily to raise morale in the United States following the Japanese sneak attack on Pearl Harbor on 7 December 1941, 16 B-25 Mitchell medium bombers were carried from San Francisco to within range of Japan on the aircraft carrier USS Hornet. These aircraft were launched on 18 April 1942 and individually bombed targets in Tokyo, Yokohama, Yokosuka, Nagoya, and Kobe. The Japanese air defense units were taken by surprise, and all the B-25s escaped without serious damage. The aircraft then continued to China and the Soviet Union, though several crashed in Japanese-held territory after running out of fuel, resulting in eight airmen being apprehended by Japanese forces. Japanese casualties during the Doolittle Raid were 50 killed and over 400 wounded and about 200 houses were destroyed.

=== Response ===
The Japanese were embarrassed by the impact of the Doolittle Raid. On 13 July 1942, the Japanese Vice Minister of War issued Military Secret Order 2190:

An enemy warplane crew who did not violate wartime international law, shall be treated as prisoners of war, and one who acted against the said law shall be punished as a wartime capital crime.

Following receipt of that Order, the Assistant Chief of Staff of Imperial Army Headquarters dispatched it to the Chief of Staff of the Japanese Expeditionary Force in China. He attached a Memorandum which stated that: "In regard to Military Secret order No. 2190 concerning the disposition of the captured enemy airmen, request that action be deferred ... pending proclamation of the military law and its official announcement, and the scheduling of the date of execution of the American airmen." On 13 August 1942, General Shunroku Hata, Supreme Commander of the Japanese Forces in China promulgated Military Order No. 4, which became known as the "Enemy Airmen's Act". This law, which was in part ex post facto, provided that:

Article I: This law shall apply to all enemy airmen who raid the Japanese homeland, Manchukuo, and the Japanese zones of military operations, and who come within the areas under the jurisdiction of the China Expeditionary Force.
Article II: Any individual who commits any or all of the following shall be subject to military punishment:

Section 1. The bombing, strafing, and otherwise attacking of civilians with the objective of cowing, intimidating, killing or maiming them.
Section 2. The bombing, strafing or otherwise attacking of private properties, whatsoever, with the objectives of destroying or damaging same.
Section 3. The bombing, strafing or otherwise attacking of objectives, other than those of military nature, except in those cases where such an act is unavoidable.
Section 4. In addition to those acts covered in the preceding three sections, all other acts violating the provisions of International Law governing warfare.

Article III: Military punishment shall be the death penalty [or] life imprisonment, or a term of imprisonment for not less than ten years.

This military law shall be applicable to all acts committed prior to the date of its approval.

== Allied casualties ==
The Enemy Airmen's Act contributed to the deaths of untold numbers of Allied airmen throughout the Pacific War. The first victims to be put on trial under the act were the Doolittle raiders captured by the Japanese in China in April 1942. They were put on trial on 28 August in Tokyo and charged with allegedly strafing Japanese civilians during the 18 April raid. However, the Japanese did not produce any evidence against them. Worse, the eight airmen were forbidden to give any defense and nonetheless found guilty of "bombing, strafing, and otherwise attacking of civilians with the objective of cowing, intimidating, killing or maiming them" and sentenced to death. However, on the urging of Prime Minister Hideki Tojo, Emperor Hirohito commuted five to life imprisonment. The three others were taken to a cemetery outside Shanghai in China where they were executed by firing squad on October 14, 1942. News of the execution caused massive public outrage in the U.S. and President Franklin D. Roosevelt condemned the Japanese as "barbarous" and "depraved". Historian John W. Dower noted that the public outrage "was comparable to the rage that greeted the news of Pearl Harbor." The British embassy in Washington D.C. reported the emotional response to London that the uproar was such that it "sharply increased the stimulus of national anger and humiliation which makes of the Pacific front permanently a more burning issue than [the] European front is ever likely to be."

On 16/17 March 1945, 331 USAAF B-29 heavy bombers launched a firebombing raid against the Japanese city of Kobe as part of the strategic bombing campaign of Japan. After the raid, 8,841 residents were confirmed to have been killed in the resulting firestorms, which destroyed an area of three square miles and included 21% of Kobe's urban area. Three B-29 bombers were lost during the raid. Two B-29 airmen, Sergeant Algy S. Augunas and 2nd Lieutenant Robert W. Nelson, who survived after being downed, were captured by the Japanese and taken to the Osaka military prison where the Central Army had its headquarters. The captured fliers were brought before a hastily convened court, found guilty of "indiscriminate bombing" of Osaka and Kobe, and sentenced to death. Asked if he had any last words, Sergeant Augunas stated simply: "I don't hate none of you, because you did your duty as I did my duty, only what I want to say is that this damn war will be over soon and there will be peace forever. That is all." After a botched beheading that the Japanese tried to cover up, the two Americans were shot in the head at point-blank range.

It is estimated that 132 Allied airmen shot down during bombing raids on Japan in 1944–45 were executed after summary trials or drumhead courts-martial. 33 American airmen were deliberately killed by IJA personnel at Fukuoka, including 15 who were beheaded shortly after the Japanese Government's intention to surrender was announced on August 15, 1945. Mobs of civilians also killed several Allied airmen before the Japanese military arrived to take the men into custody. Another 94 airmen died from other causes while in Japanese custody, including 52 who were killed when they were deliberately left in a prison during the bombing of Tokyo on May 24–25, 1945.

In July 1945, a flight of American B-24 aircraft were sent on a mission to bomb Japanese-controlled Singapore. As they flew over to the target, they were shot down by two Japanese warships, the destroyer Kamikaze and the minesweeper, Toshimaru. Seven survivors were picked up by the two ships and brought to the naval base at Seletar where they were detained for some time. On August 4/5, 1945, the flyers were executed.

== Aftermath ==
After World War II, many Japanese officers who carried out mock trials and illegal executions under the Enemy Airmen's Act were found guilty of war crimes. At the trial of Lieutenant-Commander Okamoto by a British military tribunal in December 1947, he was accused of ordering the execution of captured American airmen in Singapore. Sub-lieutenant Oka Harumitzu at the trial said that the flyers were taken into Seletar Naval Base shortly after the planes were shot down. The flyers were divided into two groups, three were put in one hut and four in another. On August 4-5, 1945, the flyers were put inside a truck by Japanese officers with the intention of beheading them. Later, all of the flyers were executed by 25 Japanese sailors. Some Japanese officers argued that the execution of American flyers was justified because they could not send them back to Japan, could not guard them indefinitely, and that although the general policy was to send enemy prisoners of war back to Japan or hand them over to Japanese authorities, the orders of Fleet HQ had to be carried out.
