= Faha Massacre Site =

- U.S. National Register of Historic Places
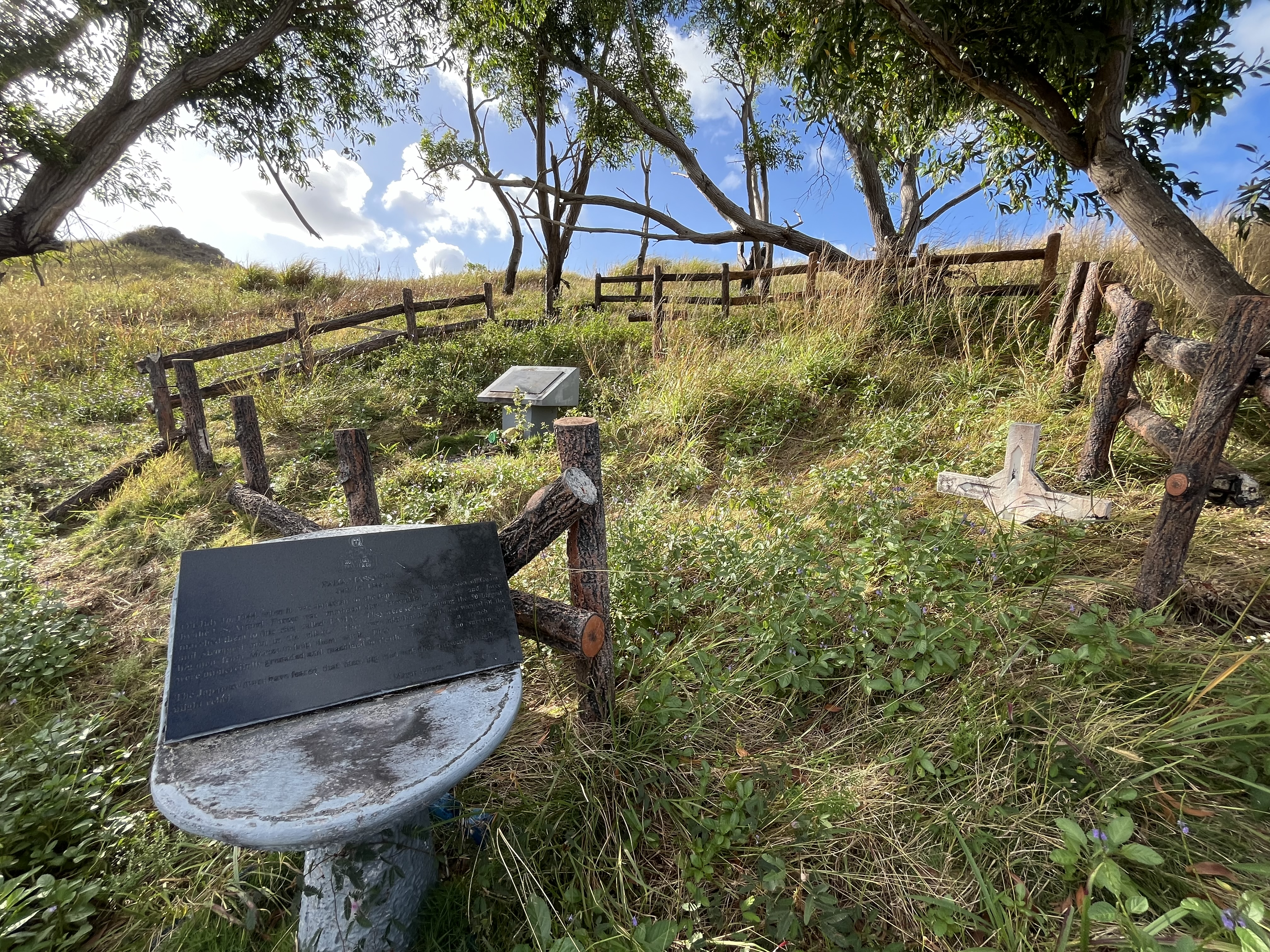

- Location within Guam
- Nearest city: Merizo, Guam
- Coordinates: 13°16′18″N 144°39′49″E
- Area: 1.5 acres (0.61 ha)
- Built: 1944
- NRHP reference No.: 91001091
- Added to NRHP: August 27, 1991

The Faha Massacre Site is located several hundred meters behind the Catholic cemetery in the village of Merizo on the United States island of Guam. The site is in a small grove of trees at the top of the rise behind the cemetery, demarcated by a perimeter of concrete pickets formed and painted to look like wood. An unmaintained trail leads to the site. A metal plaque mounted on a concrete block commemorates the 30 native Chamorro men who were slaughtered here on July 16, 1944, by members of the Imperial Japanese Army (IJA) during the Japanese occupation of the island during World War II. The IJA routinely forced Guam's native population to work on its construction projects. The men who were killed here were rounded up for a work crew. Why they were killed is unclear, as there were no survivors. The massacre took place one day after the Tinta Massacre (in which 46 were killed), and about one week before the liberation of the island began.

The site was listed on the National Register of Historic Places in 1991.

== See also ==
- National Register of Historic Places listings in Guam
