= Olive Paschke =

Australian Army matron (1905-1942)

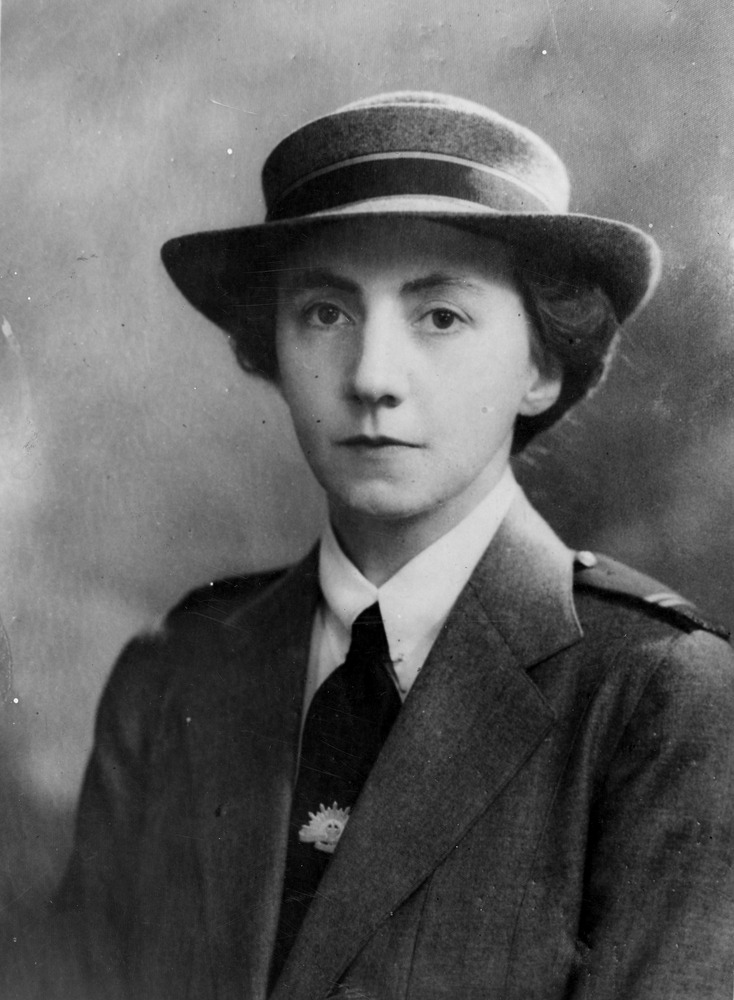
- Olive Paschke in 1942
- Born: 19 July 1905; Dimboola, Victoria, Australia
- Died: 15 February 1942 (aged 36); Java Sea
- Military career
- Allegiance: Australia
- Branch: Second Australian Imperial Force
- Service years: 1940–1942
- Rank: Matron
- Service number: VX38812
- Unit: Australian Army Nursing Service
- Conflicts: Second World War
- Awards: Royal Red Cross; Florence Nightingale Medal

Olive Dorothy Paschke, RRC (19 July 1905 – 15 February 1942) was a distinguished Australian army nurse who died in the Second World War.

== Early life ==
Olive Dorothy Paschke was born at Dimboola, Victoria, the daughter of Heinrich Wilhelm Paschke and Ottilie Emma Krieg Paschke. Both of her parents were born in Australia. Her father was a farmer and a station agent. Paschke earned her nursing certificate at Queen Victoria Memorial Hospital for Women and Children in Melbourne. She also held certificates in midwifery and infectious disease nursing.

== Nursing career ==
Paschke worked as a hospital matron at Dimboola for four years, then in Melbourne at the Jessie McPherson Community Hospital. She joined the Australian Army Nursing Service in 1940, at age 35. She was posted to Malaya, to establish the 2/10th Australian General Hospital, in early 1941. In 1942 she was sent to Singapore to help convert a school into a 200-bed hospital. Soon her unit was converting nearby buildings and treating up to 600 patients at a time. Paschke was recognized with the award of the Royal Red Cross in January 1942.

In February 1942, Paschke and Irene Drummond were the matrons supervising 63 nurses when all of them were sent back to Australia on a ship carrying hundreds of women and children, the SS Vyner Brooke. The ship was struck by a bomb in the Bangka Strait. Paschke's life raft never reached land, and all its passengers were considered lost at sea, presumed drowned. Twenty-two of Paschke's colleagues, Australian nurses who reached land following the bombing of the Vyner Brooke, were executed by Japanese soldiers in the Bangka Island massacre.

== Posthumous honours ==
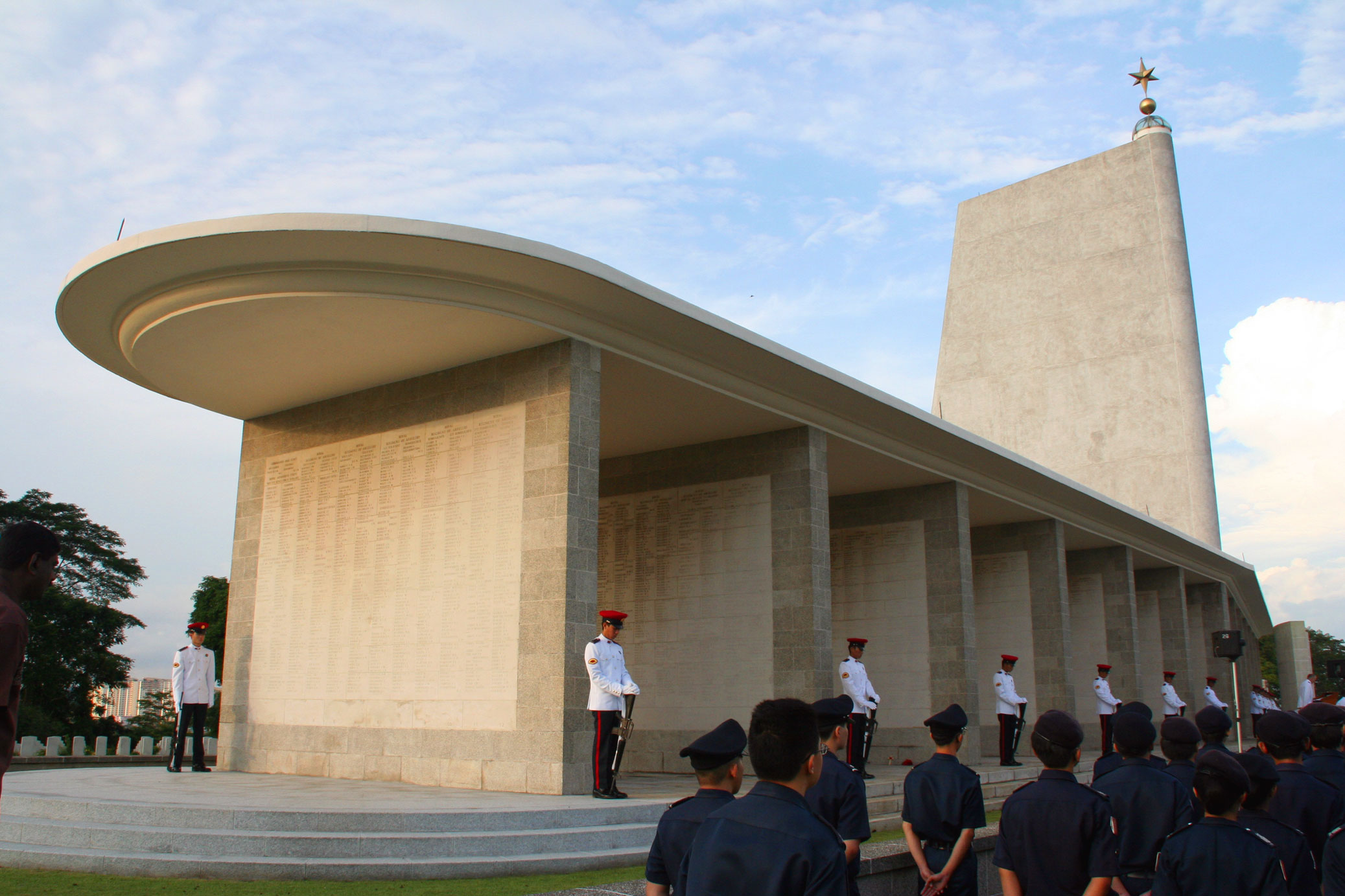
The Kranji War Memorial in Singapore

Paschke was awarded the Florence Nightingale Medal by the International Red Cross Committee in 1951. The Matron Paschke Memorial Sundial at her alma mater in Dimboola was dedicated in 1949. Paschke's name is inscribed on the Kranji War Memorial in Singapore.

Pashke Place in the Canberra suburb of Chisholm is named in her honour.
