= Broken Hill Hospital =

Broken Hill Base Hospital

Geography
- Location: Broken Hill, New South Wales, Australia
- Coordinates: 31°56′51″S 141°27′18″E

History
- Founded: 17 May 1887

Links

Broken Hill Hospital

Building details
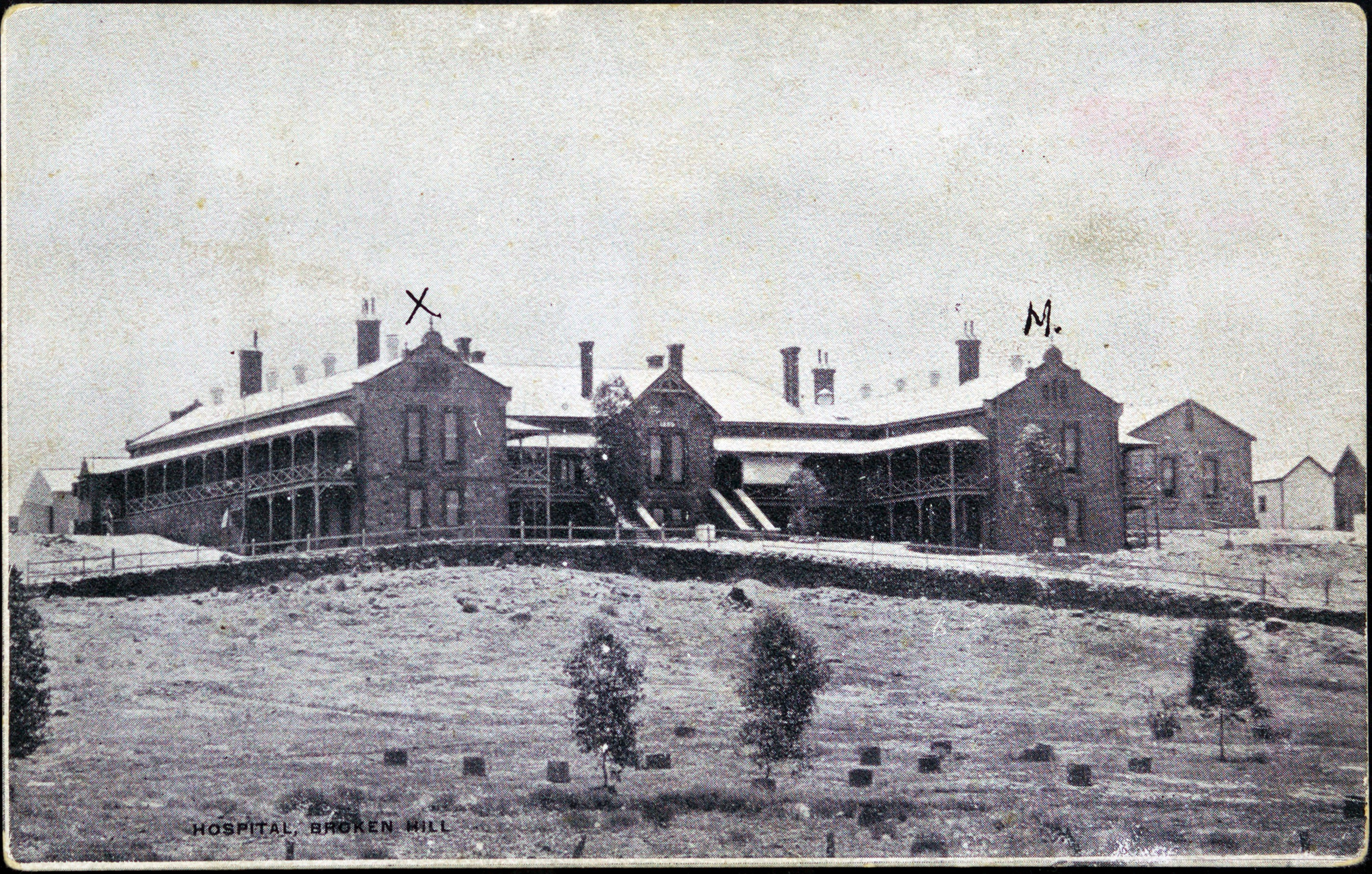

General information
- Completed: April 1889
- Opened: 26 June 1889
- Cost: £3,700

Broken Hill Hospital

Building details
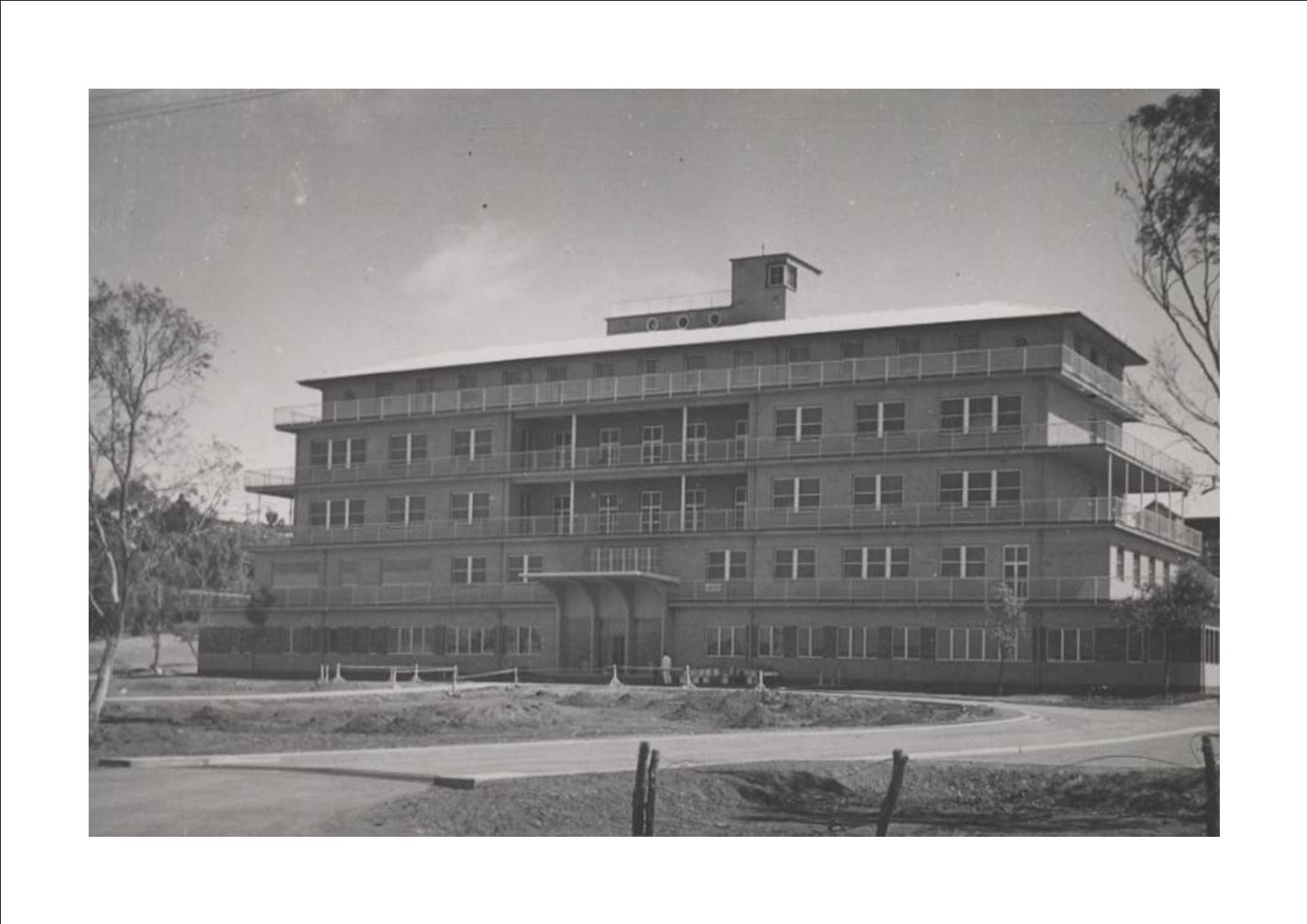
- Broken Hill Hospital c1942

General information
- Coordinates: 31°57′38″S 141°27′09″E
- Groundbreaking: 1941
- Demolished: December 1999

Broken Hill Base Hospital

Building details

General information
- Coordinates: 31°56′51″S 141°27′19″E
- Opened: March 2000
- Cost: $32M

The Broken Hill Hospital is a multi-functionary regional hospital serving the community of Broken Hill, New South Wales, Australia, as well as its surrounding areas.

== History ==
In Broken Hill’s early days the residents lived in dwellings that consisted mainly of tents or iron structure, and the small community was dealt many hardships over the including dust storms, severe heat, drought, dirty drinking water, unsanitary conditions, disease and mining accidents were commonplace. The major illnesses in the community were diphtheria, typhoid, lead poisoning, pneumonia, dysentery and enteritis and there was a high mortality rate for the young of Broken Hill. In 1886 there was no medical facility in the township of Broken Hill, in contrast Silverton, New South Wales had three medical practitioners, but after BHP was approached by the Miners association it was agreed to provide a temporary hospital structure that could hold six beds, a morgue and two outhouses were also included, this first initial structure was a simple timber and iron dwelling.

Though only the year after in 1887, Broken Hill’s first hospital was opened on 16 May by Wyman Brown, to replace the temporary structure, this new hospital was built on the site of Broken Hill’s present jail, at a cost of 260 pounds, over the next few years several additions were built onto the hospital. In September 1888 the contract for the erection of the new hospital was awarded to R.Honey at the cost of 3,566 pounds, to be built in Thomas Street the location of the site of the present hospital. The new hospital was officially opened on 26 June 1889 by Sir Henry Parkes, the hospital had received donations prior to the opening from the directors of BHP (500 pounds), and George McCulloch (700 pounds). The surgical ward was named the "McCulloch Ward" to commemorate his generosity.

In June 1939, the Governor-General of Australia, Lord Gowrie, laid a foundation stone for the new Hospital, and officially opened the Australian Aerial Medical Services wireless station at Round Hill. In September 1941, the Governor of New South Wales, Lord Wakehurst opened the new five-story air conditioned Hospital which had a capacity of 245 patients; his wife Lady Wakehurst opened the Hospital Kiosk.
Over the years additions were made to the Hospital; In 1930 the Maternity wing was officially opened, and a new maternity wing rebuilt in 1954, enforcing visiting hours for the new mothers, it provides a "wide range of comforts for mother and baby and a waiting room for the anxious father,” the hospital was also a registered school for general and midwifery nursing, with a high standard of teaching.

In April 1981, the Broken Hill Hospital changed its name to Broken Hill Base Hospital.

=== Staff ===
- Dr Henry Groves was the hospital's first surgeon, and was on call day and night, also supplying medicines and equipment.
- During World War II, Matron Irene Melville Drummond and Lieutenant Vivian Bullwinkel were among nurses massacred on Banka Island after the sinking of their ship south of Singapore. Bullwinkel survived and distinguished herself in the nursing profession, while Drummond was killed; in 1949 a memorial park in the hospital grounds was officially opened in honour of Sister Drummond.
- Former Broken Hill Hospital nurse Anne Jones was one of numerous staff members who said they were the victims of a concerted effort by members of management to bully her out of her position. The organisation launched an independent inquiry in response to a number of broad allegations raised by nursing staff in November, but the spokesman said nurses were unwilling to provide details to support their allegations.

== Recent ==
In May 1997, plans for a new hospital building were announced, December 1999 the old building was demolished and the new hospital was officially opened in March 2000, by Craig Knowles, the NSW Minister for Health, the new hospital was built at a cost of $32 million. Some key features of the newest facility include;

- 80 multifunctional acute beds (medical, surgical, obstetrics, coronary & intensive care, pediatrics, palliative & mental health units)
- 8 space day procedure unit
- Rehabilitation Centre
- Emergency services

In July 2012, the Broken Hill Health Service celebrated its 125th anniversary, just shy of a year later in February 2013 a $6.6million sub acute 10 bed mental health facility was opened by the Commissioner, John Feneley, and Mental health minister Kevin Humphries. Broken Hill Hospital will also accommodate training medical interns in July 2013, for the first time in decades.
