= Casino and Kyogle Courier and North Coast Advertiser =

Former newspaper in New South Wales, Australia

First edition of the Casino and Kyogle Courier and North Coast Advertiser

The Casino and Kyogle Courier and North Coast Advertiser, was an English language newspaper, published in Casino, New South Wales, Australia.

== History ==
The first edition of the paper was issued Saturday 17 December 1904. Publication of the newspaper continued into 1932, when it ceased after 4 May 1932. The paper was published by Alexander Ellis Leece, and Cornelius Coleman, both of whom had previously worked at the Advocate, in the Northern Rivers region of New South Wales. Upon the release of the first edition, the newspaper was heralded as "... an excellent production both from a literary and mechanical point of view, and the paper bids fair to hold its own creditably in the field of North Coast journalism".

== Digitisation ==
The Casino and Kyogle Courier and North Coast Advertiser has been digitised as part of the Australian Newspapers Digitisation Program of the National Library of Australia.

== See also ==
- List of newspapers in New South Wales
