= Clarice Halligan =

Australian nurse, missionary, Australian Army nurse

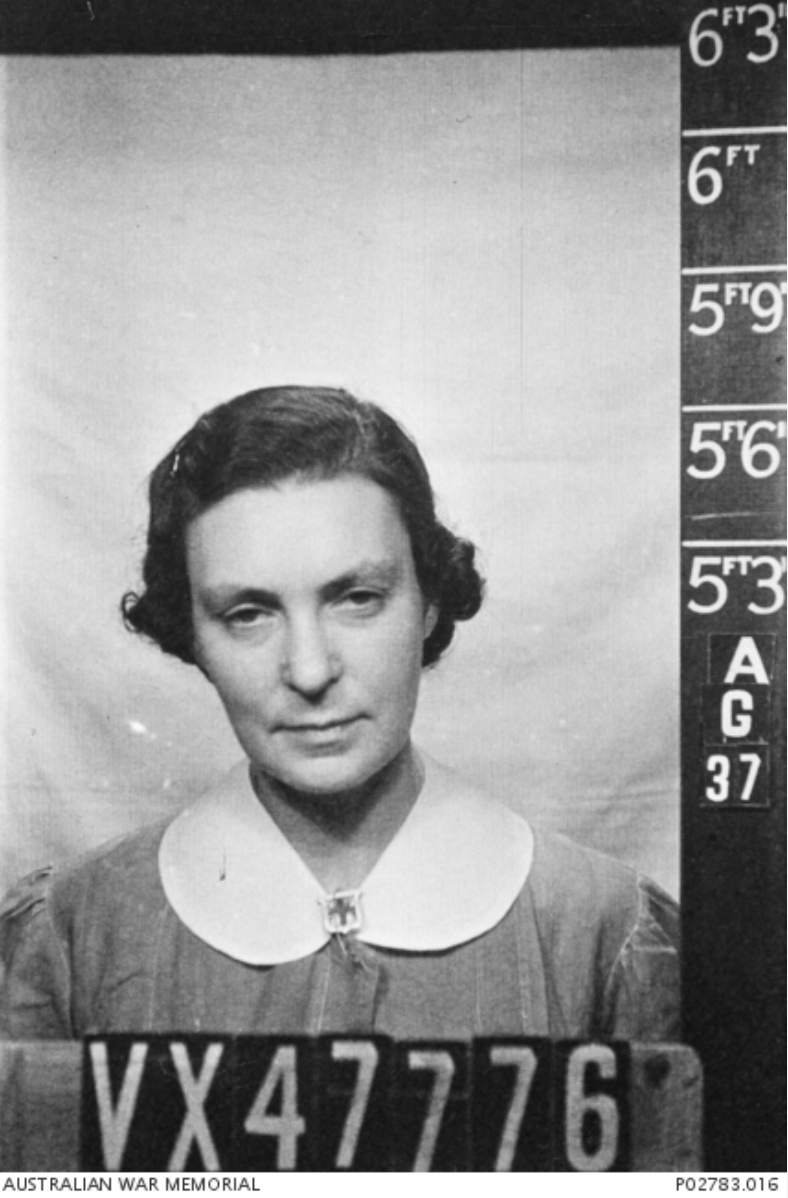
- Victorian paybook image (1940–1941)
- Born: 17 September 1904; Ballarat, Victoria
- Died: 16 February 1942 (aged 37); Bangka Island, Dutch East Indies
- Military career
- Allegiance: Australia
- Branch: Second Australian Imperial Force
- Service years: 1940–1942
- Rank: Sister
- Service number: VFX47776
- Unit: Australian Army Nursing Service
- Conflicts: Second World War

Clarice Halligan (17 September 1904 – 16 February 1942) was an Australian nurse and missionary. During the Second World War she enlisted in the Australian Army Nursing Service, and while a prisoner of war was killed by the Japanese in the Bangka Island massacre.

== Early life ==
Clarice Isobel Halligan was born in Ballarat, Victoria, on 17 September 1904, the daughter of Joseph Patrick Halligan and Emily Watson Chalmers. She had seven brothers and sisters.

Halligan trained in nursing at The Melbourne Hospital and Women's Hospital. She worked for three and a half years at the renamed Royal Melbourne Hospital. In 1934 she travelled to Papua New Guinea as a missionary, landing in Port Moresby on 31 July.

== Second World War ==
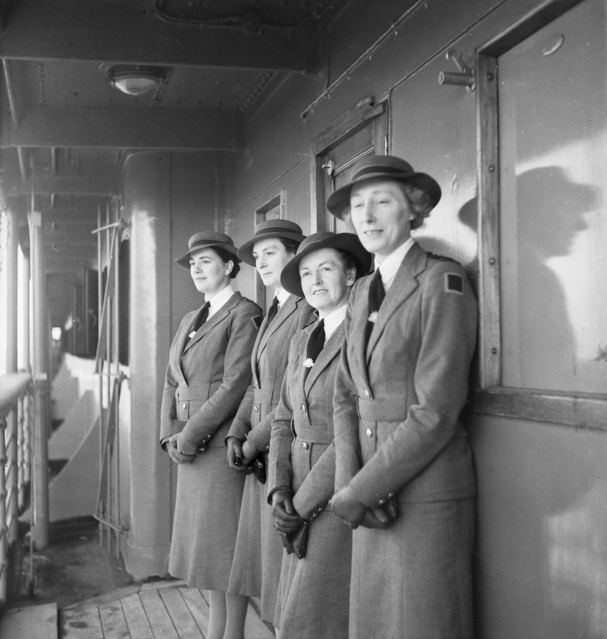
Staff Nurse Mary Cuthbertson, Sister Clarice Halligan, Sister Ada Syer and Staff Nurse Ruby Wilson on the transport ship Malaya, 29 July 1941

Halligan enlisted in the Australian Army Nursing Service at the Australian Army Medical Corps Depot in Melbourne on 11 July 1940. She joined the 2/13th Australian General Hospital on 20 December, serving in Malacca, Malaysia and Singapore following the Japanese advance.

In February 1942, Halligan was evacuated from Singapore on the SS Vyner Brooke. Together with 65 Australian nurses and over 250 civilian men, women and children, she was evacuated from Singapore three days before the fall of Malaya. She was injured when the ship was struck by Japanese aerial torpedoes and sunk in the Bangka Strait on 14 February, leaving 22 nurses stranded on Bangka Island in the Dutch East Indies (now Indonesia). The nurses were taken prisoners of war by the Japanese, along with 25 British soldiers.

On 16 February the group was massacred. The soldiers were bayoneted and the nurses were ordered to march into the sea at Radji Beach, where they were shot. Halligan was 37 years old.

== Awards and honours ==
Halligan was commemorated in a Last Post ceremony at the Australian War Memorial on 9 February 2020. Her memorial is in the Singapore Memorial within Kranji War Cemetery, and she is commemorated on the Augusta Australian Army Nursing Sisters Monument, the Australian Ex-Prisoners of War Memorial in Ballarat, and the Australian Military Nurses Memorial.

== See also ==
- Vivian Bullwinkel, sole surviving nurse of the Bangka Island massacre
