= Henry Wallace Browning =

Australian lawn bowls sportsman

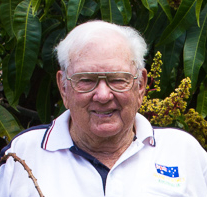
Wal Browning, 7 October 2013

Henry Wallace "Wal" Browning OAM (born 9 May 1928) is an Australian lawn bowls sportsman. Wal holds the record for the "Oldest Outdoor Bowls IBD World Champion (Male)" with Guinness World Records. Wal retired from IBD lawn bowls in 2011.

== Early life ==
Wal Browning was born on 9 May 1928 in Casino, New South Wales. He left school at the age of 14 and began work for the Department of Railways New South Wales in March, 1946.

Browning married Audrey Judd on 24 May 1951. He retired as Information Officer at Sydney Central station in November, 1986.

== Sports ==
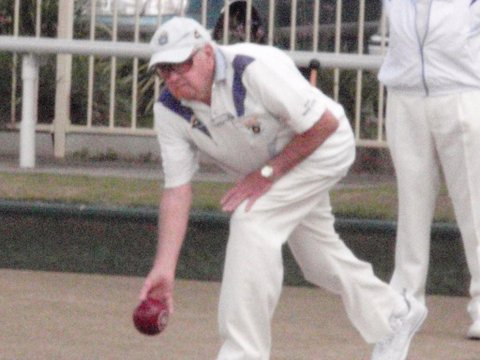
Wal Browning competing in Lawn Bowls

Wal Browning is featured on the Bankstown Sporting Hall of Fame for lawn bowls at the John Mackay Sports Centre. and holds the record for the "Oldest Outdoor Bowls IBD World Champion (Male)" with Guinness World Records granted in 2008 at age 79 years and 169 days.

While playing for the International Bowls for the Disabled, Browning has won:

1. All Singles games at the Trans-Tasman Shield in New Zealand in 2006
2. Gold in the singles and silver in the mixed triples event at the International Bowls for Disabled World Championship at Harbord in 2007
3. 3 singles and 3 pairs games in Pretoria, South Africa at the Vision Impaired IBD Outdoor World Bowls Championship in 2011.
