= Guy Creighton =

Australian equestrian (born 1949)

Personal information
- Nationality: Australian
- Born: 1 September 1949 (age 75); Casino, New South Wales, Australia

Sport
- Sport: Equestrian
- Event: Show jumping

Guy Creighton (born 1 September 1949) is an Australian equestrian. He competed at the 1976 Summer Olympics and the 1984 Summer Olympics.
