= Pat Darling =

Australian nurse

- Born: Janet Patteson Gunther; 31 August 1913
- Died: 2 December 2007 (aged 94)
- Occupations: Servicewoman, nursing sister
- Years active: 1940–1990

Pat Darling (31 August 1913 in Casino, New South Wales, Australia – 2 December 2007) was an Australian servicewoman and nursing sister with the 2/10th Australian General Hospital.

== Early life ==
Born as Janet Patteson Gunther, her great grandfather, Archdeacon James Gunther, was a missionary to indigenous Australians at Wellington, New South Wales. Her grandfather, Archdeacon William Gunther, was rector of St John's, Parramatta. The second eldest of eight children, she attended bush schools before leaving school at 12 to help out at home in the farm. Her mother Jane Gunther née Thomson is descended from Mary (Molly) Reibey, whose image now appears on the Australian twenty dollar note.

== World War II ==
She trained in general nursing at Royal Prince Alfred Hospital in Camperdown, and worked as a private nurse until enlisting in 1940 with the 2nd/10th Australian General Hospital. She sailed to Singapore in February 1941. She was one of the Australian nurses taken prisoner by the Japanese in Sumatra during World War II. She wrote about her three and a half years incarceration and survival in Portrait of a Nurse (published in 2001).

== Personal ==
She married Major George Colin Darling (NX101315 2/5 Infantry Battalion), a manager with the Port Kembla steelworks in 1957 and a widower with four children in 1949. She stopped nursing in the late 1940s/early 1950s.

Darling died on 2 December 2007, aged 94. Her husband George Colin Darling predeceased her on 6 August 1983, aged 76.

== See also ==
- Vivian Bullwinkel
