= Tess Mallos =

Australian writer (1933–2012)

- Born: Anastasia Calopades; 25 January 1933; Casino, New South Wales, Australia
- Died: 31 July 2012 (aged 79)
- Occupations: Chef, cookbook author, food consultant
- Spouse: John Mallos
- Children: Three

Tess Mallos (née Anastasia Calopades) (25 January 1933 – 31 July 2012) was an Australian food and cooking writer, journalist, author, and commentator. She wrote a number of books on Greek and Middle Eastern cuisine.

== Biography ==
Her parents, both from the Greek island of Kythera, emigrated to Australia where she was born and raised in the country town of Casino, New South Wales. Her father, Andonis Calopades arrived in Australia at the turn of the 20th century as an 11-year-old, and worked in the famous Kominos cafe in the central business district of Sydney. In 1919, he moved to Casino, where he ran the Marble Bar Cafe. Her mother was Calliope Manolliaras.

Mallos began her writing career in cooking as a freelance food consultant in advertising, creating and writing recipes for a wide range of food as well as preparing food for photography. Her first book in 1976 was the Greek Cook Book, which featured familiar recipes from her Greek heritage. Many books followed featuring recipes gathered from cuisines in the Mediterranean, Middle East and North Africa.

Mallos worked as food consultant to the Australian Meat Board, where she wrote editorials on meat cooking for some 80 publications throughout Australia, and 20 overseas countries. She also demonstrated her recipes in cooking segments on a number of Australian television cooking shows.

Mallos had three children.

== Bibliography ==
- Greek Cook Book ISBN 0600340600
- The Complete Mediterranean Cookbook ISBN 0804830908
- Turkish Cooking ISBN 1898259267
- Middle Eastern Cooking ISBN 0794650341
- The Complete Middle East Cookbook ISBN 0804838763
- Cooking of the Gulf: Bahrain, Kuwait, Oman, Qatar, Saudi Arabia, United Arab Emirates ISBN 1898259062
- Cooking Moroccan ISBN 1592234038
- North African Cooking ISBN 0794650228
- Cooking in Colour ISBN 0727101935
- Olive Oil ISBN 0804839190
- Fillo Pastry Cookbook ISBN 085091695X
- Middle Eastern Home Cooking ISBN 1863027556
- Bean Cook Book ISBN 0727105043
- The Barbecue Cookbook: For Kettle Grills & Other Covered Barbecues ISBN 051710251X
- The Made in Australia Food Book: With Over 200 Recipes ISBN 0850916550
- Meat Cookbook ISBN 0727100300
- The Australian Book of Meat Cookery ISBN 0 600 30068 4
- The Food of Morocco ISBN 1741960347
- The Little Moroccan Cookbook ISBN 1743360673
