= Irene Drummond =

Australian Army nurse

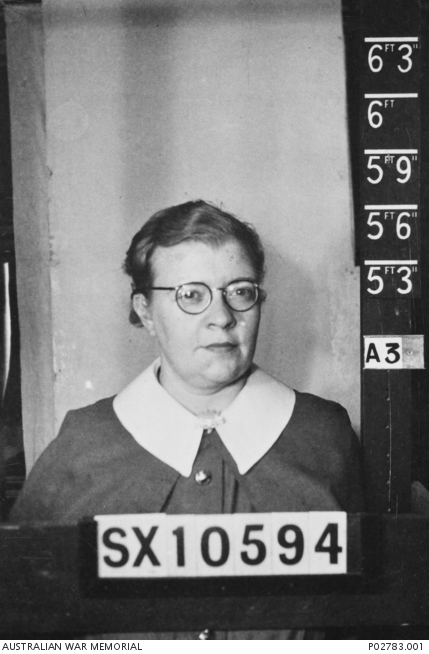
- Born: 26 July 1905; Ashfield, New South Wales, Australia
- Died: 16 February 1942 (aged 36); Bangka Island, Dutch East Indies (now Indonesia)
- Military career
- Allegiance: Australia
- Branch: Second Australian Imperial Force
- Service years: 1940–1942
- Rank: Matron
- Service number: SFX10594
- Unit: Royal Australian Army Nursing Corps
- Conflicts: Second World War
- Awards: Mentioned in Despatches

Matron Irene Melville Drummond (26 July 1905 – 16 February 1942) was an Australian Army nurse during the Second World War. She was the most senior-ranking among the 22 Australian nurses killed in the Bangka Island massacre on 16 February 1942.

Drummond was posthumously mentioned in despatches in 1946 "for gallant and distinguished service in Malaya in 1942".

== See also ==
- Clarice Halligan, also killed in the Bangka Island Massacre
- Vivian Bullwinkel, sole survivor of the Bangka Island Massacre
