= Vivian Bullwinkel =

Australian Army nurse

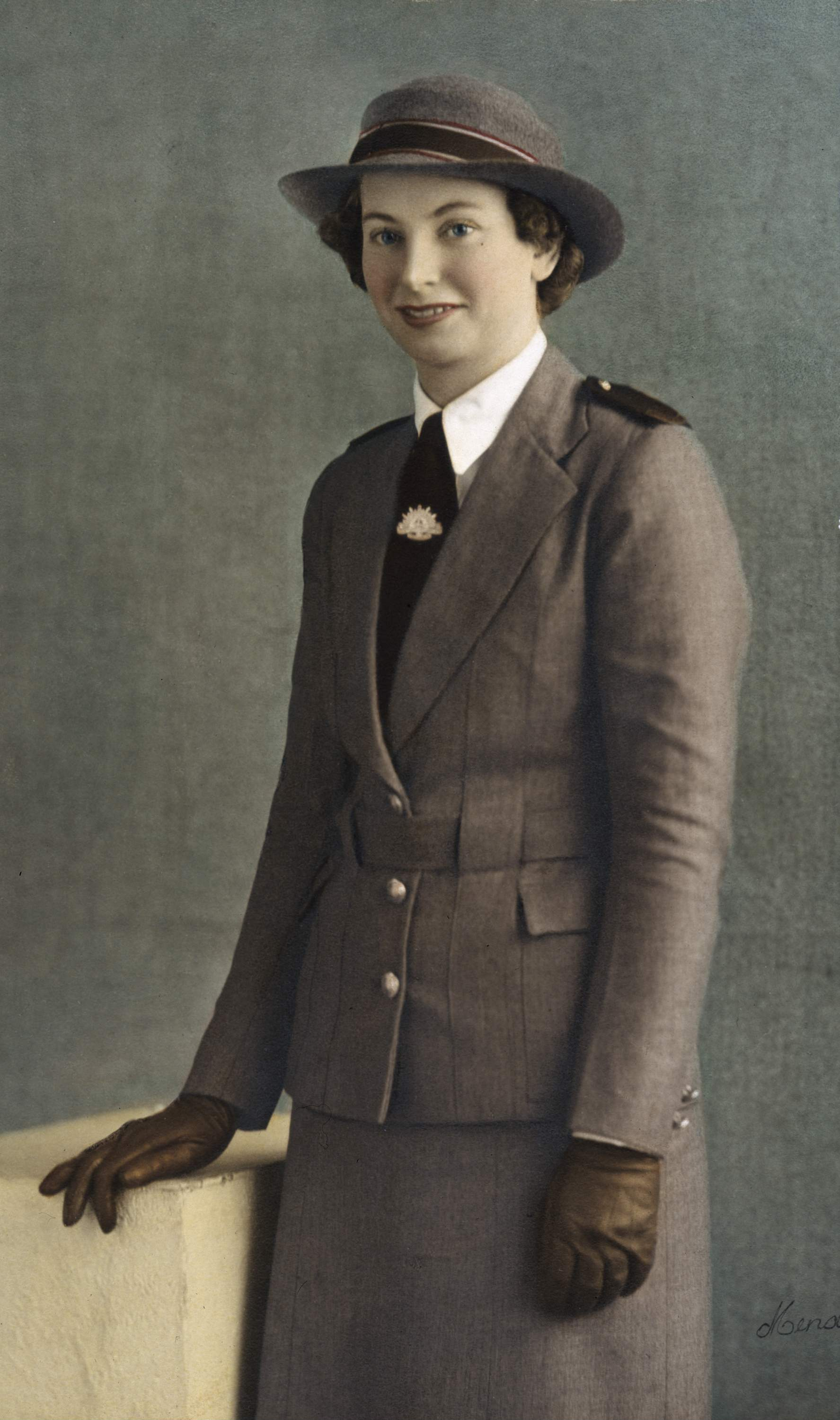
- Studio portrait of Vivian Bullwinkel, taken in May 1941
- Born: 18 December 1915; Kapunda, South Australia
- Died: 3 July 2000 (aged 84); Perth, Western Australia
- Military career
- Allegiance: Australia
- Branch: Royal Australian Army Nursing Corps
- Service years: 1941–1947
- Rank: Lieutenant Colonel
- Conflicts: Second World War
- Awards: Officer of the Order of Australia; Member of the Order of the British Empire; Associate of the Royal Red Cross; Efficiency Decoration; Florence Nightingale Medal

Lieutenant Colonel Vivian Statham, AO, MBE, ARRC, ED (née Bullwinkel; 18 December 1915 – 3 July 2000) was an Australian Army nurse during the Second World War. She was the sole surviving nurse of the Bangka Island Massacre, when the Japanese killed 21 of her fellow nurses on Radji Beach, Bangka Island, in the Dutch East Indies (now Indonesia) on 16 February 1942.

== Early life ==
Vivian Bullwinkel was born on 18 December 1915 in Kapunda, South Australia, to George Albert and Eva Bullwinkel (née Shegog). She had a brother, John. She attended Broken Hill High School, where she was School Captain in 1933. She trained as a nurse and midwife at Broken Hill, New South Wales, and began her nursing career in Hamilton, Victoria, before moving to the Jessie McPherson Hospital in Melbourne.

== Second World War ==
In 1941, wanting to enlist for service in the Second World War, Bullwinkel volunteered as a nurse with the Royal Australian Air Force but was rejected for having flat feet. She was, however, able to join the Australian Army Nursing Service; assigned to the 2/13th Australian General Hospital (2/13th AGH), in September 1941 she sailed for Singapore. After a few weeks with the 2/10th AGH, Bullwinkel rejoined the 13th AGH in Johor Bahru.

Japanese troops invaded Malaya in December 1941 and began to advance southwards, winning a series of victories. By late January 1942 they were advancing through Johore and the 13th AGH was to evacuate to Singapore. A short-lived defence of the island ended in defeat, and, on 12 February, Bullwinkel and 65 other nurses boarded the SS Vyner Brooke to escape.

Two days later, the ship was sunk by Japanese aircraft. Bullwinkel, 21 other nurses and a large group of men, women, and children made it ashore at Radji Beach on Bangka Island. Others on board either went down with the ship or were swept away and never seen again. The group were joined the next day by others making a total of about 100 including about twenty British soldiers from another ship sunk earlier. They elected to surrender to the Japanese. An officer from the Vyner Brooke walked to Muntok, a town on the north-west of the island, to contact the Japanese. While he was away Matron Irene Drummond, the most senior of the Australian nurses, suggested that civilian women and children should start off walking towards Muntok.

In an action that later became known as the Bangka Island Massacre, Japanese soldiers came and killed the men, then motioned the nurses to wade into the sea. They then machine-gunned the nurses from behind. Bullwinkel was struck by a bullet which passed completely through her body, missing her internal organs, and feigned death until the Japanese soldiers left. She hid with British Army Private Cecil George Kingsley of the Royal Army Ordnance Corps for 12 days, tending to his severe wounds, only then realizing the extent of her own wound, before being captured. They were taken into captivity, but Kingsley died soon after from his injuries, which included a gunshot wound in his abdomen.

Recent evidence collected by historian Lynette Silver, broadcaster Tess Lawrence and biographer Barbara Angell, indicates that Bullwinkel and "most of" the nurses may have been sexually assaulted before they were murdered. However, Bullwinkel was "gagged" by the Australian government from speaking about the rapes at the Tokyo War Crimes Tribunal in 1946.

Bullwinkel was reunited with survivors of the Vyner Brooke. She told them of the massacre, but none spoke of it again until after the war lest it put Bullwinkel, as witness to the massacre, in danger. Bullwinkel spent three and half years in captivity, together with Betty Jeffrey, Wilma Oram and Margaret Dryburgh; Dryburgh, the eldest, died in captivity at the age of 54. Another surviving nurse was Pat Darling, who died in 2007.

== Later life ==
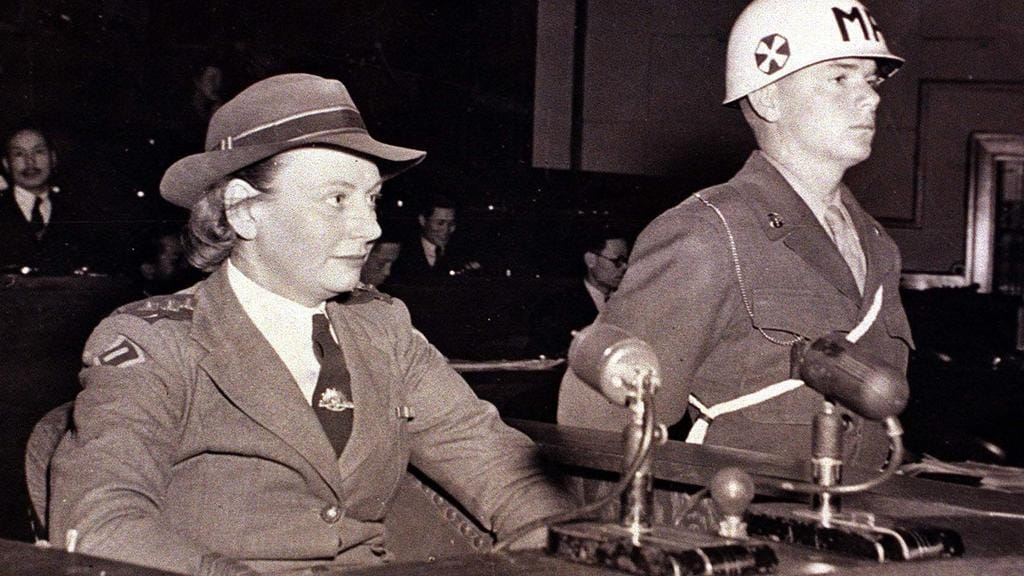
Bullwinkel at the Tokyo War Crimes Tribunal in 1946

Bullwinkel retired from the army in 1947 and became Director of Nursing at the Fairfield Infectious Diseases Hospital. Also in 1947 she gave evidence of the massacre at a war crimes trial in Tokyo. She devoted herself to the nursing profession and to honouring those killed on Bangka Island, raising funds for a nurses' memorial and serving on numerous committees, including a period as a member of the Council of the Australian War Memorial, and later president of the Australian College of Nursing.

In 1975 Operation Babylift, the name given to the mass airlift of Vietnamese orphans to Australia and US, for its second delivery chose Fairfield Infectious Diseases Hospital as the most suitable specialist facility to receive them. Matron Bullwinkel organised and led a nursing team that travelled to Sydney to board the Qantas 707 for the flight to Vietnam on 17 April 1975.

Bullwinkel married Colonel Francis West Statham in September 1977, changing her name to Vivian Statham. She returned to Bangka Island in 1992 to unveil a shrine to the nurses who had not survived the war. She died of a heart attack on 3 July 2000, aged 84, in Perth, Western Australia.

== Honours ==
Officer of the Order of Australia (AO)	1993
Member of the Order of the British Empire (MBE)	1973
Associate Member of the Royal Red Cross (ARRC)	1947
1939–45 Star	
Pacific Star	
War Medal 1939–1945	
Australia Service Medal 1939–45	
Efficiency Decoration (ED)	
Florence Nightingale Medal (Red Cross)	

In 2001, Bullwinkel was inducted posthumously to the Victorian Honour Roll of Women. In 2019, she along with Grace Wilson, were memorialised in mosaic banners installed at the Repatriation General Hospital at Heidelberg, Victoria. She became the first woman to have an Australian War Memorial statue dedicated to her in 2022.

== Legacy ==
Her sculpture in the Australian War Memorial

The Vivian Bullwinkel Wing at Hollywood Private Hospital, Perth (the former Repatriation General Hospital, Hollywood) was renamed in her honour in September 1998.

The Royal Australian Air Force Association runs the Vivian Bullwinkel Lodge aged care facility in the northern suburbs of Perth.

Australian Defence Headquarters at Russell Offices in Canberra includes a street named Vivian Bullwinkel Way.

Monash University (Melbourne) and Eastern Health (Melbourne) have named the chair in palliative care nursing after her in 2003.

Northern Melbourne Institute of TAFE redeveloped the old nurses quarters on its Fairfield campus in 2010 for residential student accommodation. A common room is named after Vivian Bullwinkel, who was the Director of Nursing for many years at the Fairfield Hospital.

In February 2023, the hall at Broken Hill High School, where Bullwinkel was school captain in 1933, was named the Vivian Bullwinkel Drill Hall.

On 2 August 2023 her statue was unveiled at the Australian war memorial.

In May 2024, the Australian Electoral Commission proposed that a new electorate in the Australian House of Representatives be created in Western Australia to be named Bullwinkel in honour of her.

== General references ==
- Klemen, L (1999–2000). "Forgotten Campaign: The Dutch East Indies Campaign 1941–1942". Archived from the original on 26 July 2011.
