= Casino, New South Wales =

Town in New South Wales, Australia

Casino
- Town
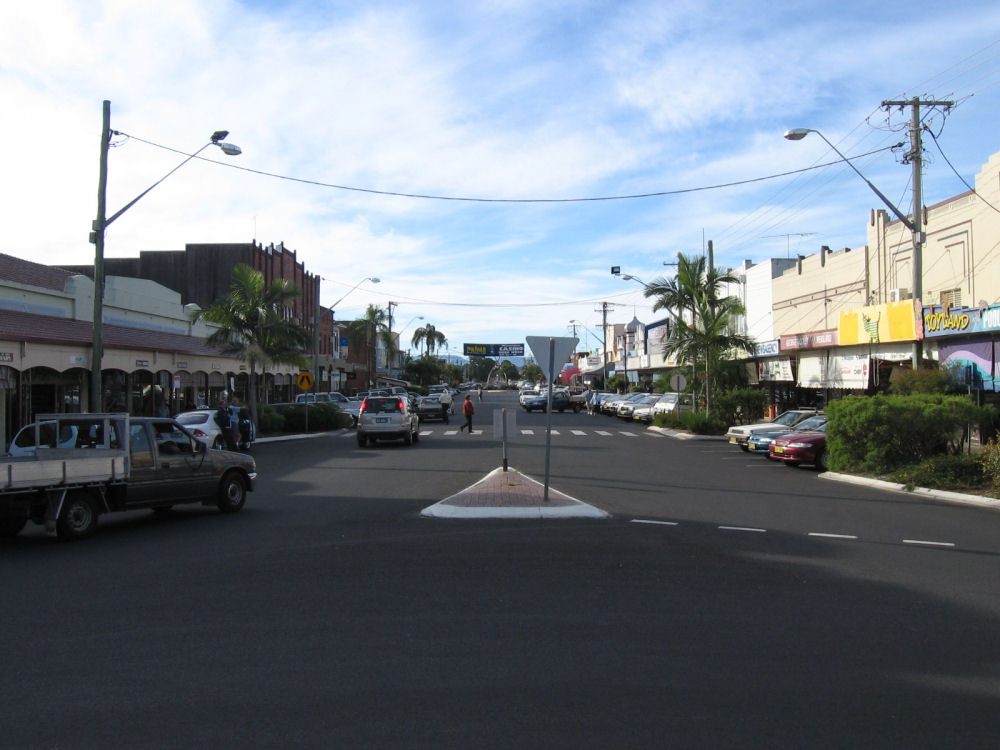
- Walker Street shopping precinct in Casino

- Coordinates: 28°52′0″S 153°03′0″E
- Country: Australia
- State: New South Wales
- LGA: Richmond Valley Council
- Location: 716 km (445 mi) N of Sydney; 228 km (142 mi) S of Brisbane; 30 km (19 mi) W of Lismore; 100 km (62 mi) N of Grafton

Government
  - State electorate: Clarence
  - Federal division: Page
- Elevation: 26 m (85 ft)

Population
  - Total: 9,968 (2021 census)
- Postcode: 2470
- Mean max temp: 26.8 °C (80.2 °F)
- Mean min temp: 13.1 °C (55.6 °F)
- Annual rainfall: 1,097.5 mm (43.21 in)

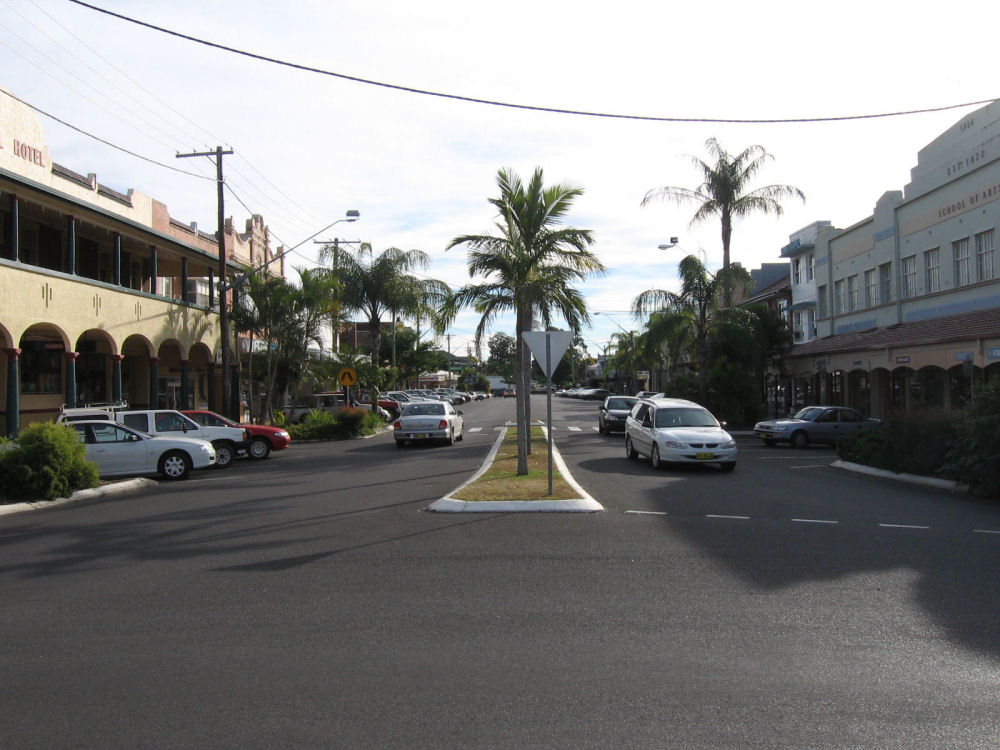
Barker St., Casino

Casino (Bandjalang: Djanangmum) is a town in the Northern Rivers area of New South Wales, Australia, with a population of 12,298 people at the 2021 census. It lies on the banks of the Richmond River and is situated at the junction of the Bruxner Highway and the Summerland Way.

It is located 726 km (451 mi) north of Sydney and 228 km (142 mi) south of Brisbane.

== Overview ==
Casino is the seat of the Richmond Valley Council, a local government area.

Settlement of the area began in 1840 when pastoral squatters George Robert Stapleton and his business partner, Mr. Clay, set up a cattle station which they initially called Cassino after Cassino (near Monte Cassino) in Italy. The town now has a sister city agreement with the Italian village.

Casino is among Australia's largest beef centres. It is the regional hub of a very large cattle industry and positions itself as the "Beef Capital" of Australia, although the city of Rockhampton also claims this title. In addition it is the service centre for a rich agricultural area.

Each year the town celebrates Casino Beef Week. It was not held in 2007 but since that year, has continued to be held and celebrated with the exception of 2020. The 2024 event took place from 18 to 26 May.

The Richmond River runs through the town separating South Casino from the rest of the town.

== Climate ==
Casino experiences a humid subtropical climate (Köppen: Cfa, Trewartha: Cfal), with hot, humid summers and mild, relatively dry winters.

Climate data for Casino Airport AWS (28º53'S, 153º04'E, 21 m AMSL) (1995–2024 normals and extremes)
Month	Jan	Feb	Mar	Apr	May	Jun	Jul	Aug	Sep	Oct	Nov	Dec	Year
Record high °C (°F)	43.2 (109.8)	45.7 (114.3)	39.6 (103.3)	34.3 (93.7)	31.8 (89.2)	31.0 (87.8)	28.8 (83.8)	36.5 (97.7)	40.2 (104.4)	40.7 (105.3)	44.1 (111.4)	42.5 (108.5)	45.7 (114.3)
Mean daily maximum °C (°F)	30.6 (87.1)	29.8 (85.6)	28.4 (83.1)	26.0 (78.8)	23.1 (73.6)	20.8 (69.4)	20.8 (69.4)	22.7 (72.9)	25.8 (78.4)	27.6 (81.7)	29.0 (84.2)	30.2 (86.4)	26.2 (79.2)
Mean daily minimum °C (°F)	19.1 (66.4)	18.9 (66.0)	17.7 (63.9)	14.1 (57.4)	10.6 (51.1)	8.2 (46.8)	6.6 (43.9)	7.1 (44.8)	10.3 (50.5)	13.4 (56.1)	15.8 (60.4)	17.8 (64.0)	13.3 (55.9)
Record low °C (°F)	11.4 (52.5)	11.0 (51.8)	9.0 (48.2)	4.4 (39.9)	0.6 (33.1)	−0.7 (30.7)	−2.2 (28.0)	−3.5 (25.7)	−1.1 (30.0)	4.3 (39.7)	6.0 (42.8)	9.0 (48.2)	−3.5 (25.7)
Average rainfall mm (inches)	128.0 (5.04)	156.3 (6.15)	144.5 (5.69)	66.8 (2.63)	80.6 (3.17)	70.5 (2.78)	32.2 (1.27)	40.9 (1.61)	33.8 (1.33)	68.0 (2.68)	104.5 (4.11)	131.1 (5.16)	1,060.1 (41.74)
Average rainy days (≥ 1.0 mm)	9.2	9.9	11.5	8.4	7.4	6.2	4.8	4.3	4.7	7.2	8.7	9.7	92
Average afternoon relative humidity (%)	54	58	57	53	54	53	46	41	41	44	50	50	50
Average dew point °C (°F)	17.8 (64.0)	18.3 (64.9)	16.8 (62.2)	14.5 (58.1)	11.2 (52.2)	9.1 (48.4)	6.6 (43.9)	6.1 (43.0)	8.8 (47.8)	11.2 (52.2)	14.2 (57.6)	16.2 (61.2)	12.6 (54.6)
Source: Bureau of Meteorology (1995-2024 normals and extremes)

== Demographics ==
Historical population
Year	Pop.	±%
1921	3,455	—
1933	5,287	+53.0%
1947	6,698	+26.7%
1954	7,844	+17.1%
1961	8,091	+3.1%
1966	8,507	+5.1%
1971	9,064	+6.5%
1976	9,456	+4.3%
1981	9,743	+3.0%
1986	10,067	+3.3%
1991	10,164	+1.0%
1996	9,990	−1.7%
2001	9,150	−8.4%
2006	9,400	+2.7%
2011	9,629	+2.4%
2016	9,982	+3.7%
2021	9,968	−0.1%
Source: Australian Bureau of Statistics data.

According to the 2021 census of Population, there were 9,968 people in Casino.

- Aboriginal and Torres Strait Islander people made up 11.5% of the population.
- 84.2% of people were born in Australia. The next most common country of birth was England at 1.5%.
- 87.5% of people spoke only English at home.
- The most common responses for religion were No Religion 32.6%, Catholic 20.9% and Anglican 17.8%.

== Transport ==
Casino railway station is situated on the main North Coast railway line between Sydney and Brisbane, north of Grafton. A branch line ran via Lismore to Murwillumbah; that line has since been closed, although lobbying is taking place to re-open it. Casino railway station is the terminus of the daily Casino XPT from Sydney and there is a daily service to and from Brisbane via the Brisbane XPT.

In the 1920s, a never completed railway branch line to Bonalbo was started. A line was also proposed from Casino via Tabulam and even a line all the way to Tenterfield.

A Miniature Railway is situated next to the Casino Golf Club. The railway operates on Sundays between 10am and 4pm on a 2.5 km stretch of track, with a museum at the end. A round trip is usually 25 minutes however on busier days it can vary.

Casino was serviced by Lismore Airport with several daily flights to Sydney until Rex Airlines discontinued its service between Sydney and Lismore, ending its longstanding operation with the final flight operating in June 2022. Air travel is now served by Ballina Byron Gateway Airport which is located approximately 66 km east of Casino.

Northern Rivers Buslines operates rural services to Lismore (670) and Kyogle (675) each weekday, with one return service to Tenterfield available on Monday, Wednesday and Friday.

Casino Bus Service operates local town loops, including a loop service to Gays Hill.

== Media ==
Radio stations that cover the town are ABC North Coast, River FM, Triple Z FM, and COWFM 107.9, a community radio station

Casino receives TV channels from SBS and ABC and the regional stations of Seven, Nine and 10 Northern NSW.

Local newspaper is served by The Northern Star.

== Education ==
- Casino High School
- Casino Public School
- Casino West Public School
- St. Mary's Primary School
- St. Mary's Catholic College School
- Casino Christian Community School

== Heritage listings ==
Casino has a number of heritage-listed sites, including:

- 102 Barker Street: Casino Post Office
- Casino-Murwillumbah railway: Old Casino railway station
- North Coast railway: Casino railway station

== Location for filming ==
The 2014 drama series The Gods of Wheat Street was set and partly filmed in Casino.

A 2018 Coca-Cola television advertisement was filmed at the Richmond Dairies factory on Dyraaba Street and a general store on the corner of Colches Street and Barker Street.

== Notable people ==
- Ian Callinan (born 1937), High Court judge
- Stan Coster (1930–1997), singer-songwriter
- Guy Creighton (born 1949), equestrian
- Pat Darling (1913–2007), nurse and author
- John Elford (1947–2024), rugby league player
- Keith Ellis (1927–1989), rugby union player
- Jeff Fatt (born 1953), musician and actor, one of The Wiggles
- Eric Ferguson (born 1955), rugby league player
- Doug Ford (born 1945), musician
- Thomas George (born 1949), politician
- Tony Glynn (1926–1994), missionary priest
- Neil Hancock (born 1976), cricketer
- Paul Henderson (born 1971), sprinter
- Clark Irving (1808–1865), early settler (pastoralist) and politician
- Ben Kennedy (born 1974), rugby league player
- Matt King (born 1980), rugby league player
- Katie Kelly (born 1975), paratriathlete
- Tess Mallos (1933–2012), food journalist and author
- Jordan Martin (born 2000), rugby league player
- Mark McGowan (born 1967), politician
- Chris Munce (born 1969), horse racing jockey
- Mark Pearson (born 1959), politician
- Brian Pezzutti (born 1947), politician and army officer
- Beverley Raphael (1934–2018), psychiatrist
- Michael Robotham (born 1960), crime novelist
- Justin Rowsell (born 1971), boxer
- David Russell, (born 1982), racing driver
- Doug Shedden (1937–2020), politician
- Paul Stenhouse, (1935–2019), priest
- Douglas G. Stuart (1931–2019), neuroscientist
- Albert Torrens (born 1976), rugby league player
- Cody Walker (born 1990), rugby league player
- Henry Wallace Browning (born 1928), lawn bowler, IBD World Champion 2007 Guinness World Record 2008
- Damien Wright (born 1975), cricket player
- Clive Andrew Williams (1915–1980), Aboriginal activist
- Richard Zann (1944–2009), ornithologist

== See also ==
- The song "I've Been Everywhere" references Casino in its second verse.
- List of never used railways

Preceding station	NSW TrainLink	Following station
Kyogle towards Brisbane	NSW TrainLink North Coast Line Brisbane XPT	Grafton towards Sydney
Terminus	NSW TrainLink North Coast Line Casino XPT	Grafton towards Sydney
