= Bangka Island massacre =

1942 massacre in Indonesia by Japan

- Part of Pacific War
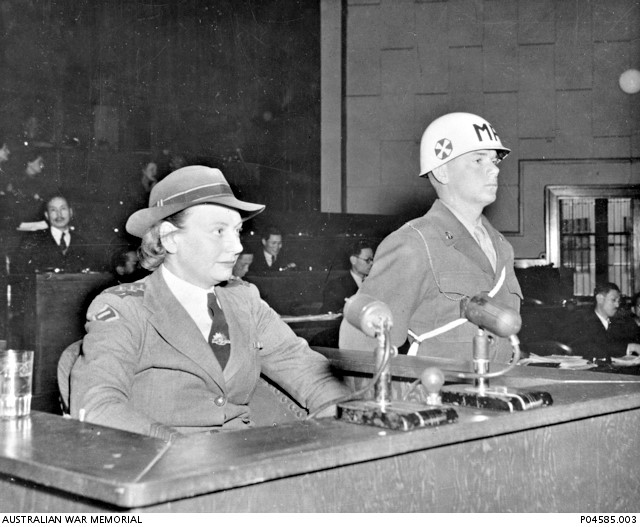
- Captain Vivian Bullwinkel giving evidence at the Tokyo War Crimes Tribunal in 1947

- Bangka Island, Indonesia
- Location: 2.026168°S 105.110795°E; Radji beach, Bangka Island
- Date: 16 February 1942
- Weapons: bayonet and machine gun
- Victims: 22 Australian Army nurses 60 Australian and British soldiers (some wounded) sailors from Vyner Brooke
- Perpetrator: Imperial Japanese Army

The Bangka Island massacre (also spelled Banka Island massacre) was the killing of unarmed Australian nurses and wounded Allied soldiers on Bangka Island, east of Sumatra in the Indonesian archipelago on 16 February 1942. Shortly after the outbreak of World War II in the Pacific troops of the Imperial Japanese Army murdered 22 Australian Army nurses, 60 Australian and British soldiers, and crew members from the Vyner Brooke. The group were the only survivors from their steamship which had been sunk by Japanese bombers just after the defeat of Singapore. After surrendering to local Japanese forces on Bangka Island, which was then part of the Dutch East Indies, the group and its wounded were taken to a beach where they were killed by being bayonetted and machine gunned in the surf. Only South Australian nurse Sister Lieutenant Vivian Bullwinkel, American Eric Germann and Royal Navy Stoker Ernest Lloyd survived.

For almost 80 years, details that the Japanese troops raped the Australian nurses before they were murdered were suppressed. It was never reported at the Tokyo War Crimes Tribunal in 1947 or included in subsequent post-war re-tellings of the massacre. Evidence that the Australian women had suffered violent sexual assault before their deaths was only reported in 2019 after being uncovered by research. Lt Bullwinkel said she was told by the Australian government to never speak about the suspected rapes that may have occurred.

== Massacre ==
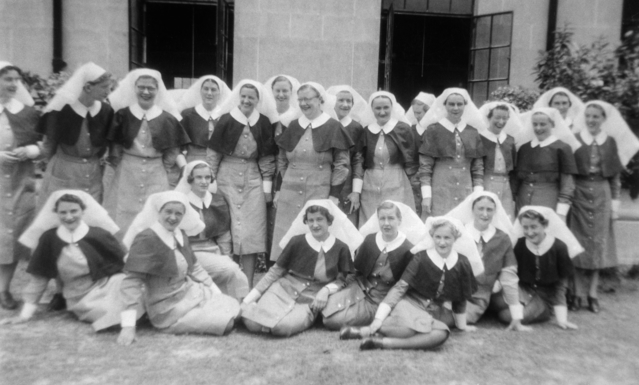
Nursing staff of 2/13th Australian General Hospital in Singapore, September 1941. Six of these nurses, including Vivian Bullwinkel (standing sixth from the left), were in the group who were murdered by the Japanese in 1942.

On 12 February 1942 the royal yacht of Sarawak Vyner Brooke left Singapore just before the city fell to the Imperial Japanese Army. The ship carried many injured service personnel and 65 nurses of the Australian Army Nursing Service from the 2/13th Australian General Hospital, as well as civilian men, women and children. The ship was bombed by Japanese aircraft and sank. Two nurses were killed in the bombing; the rest were scattered among the rescue boats to wash up on different parts of Bangka Island. About 100 survivors reunited near Radji Beach at Bangka Island in the Dutch East Indies (now Indonesia), including 22 of the original 65 nurses. Once it was discovered the Japanese held the island, an officer of the Vyner Brooke went to surrender the group to the authorities in Muntok. While he was away army matron Irene Melville Drummond, the most senior of the nurses, suggested the civilian women and children should leave for Muntok, which they did. The nurses stayed to care for the wounded. They set up a shelter with a large Red Cross sign on it.

At mid-morning the ship's officer returned with about 20 Japanese soldiers. They ordered all the wounded men capable of walking to travel around a headland. The men were lined up and the Japanese set up machine guns. Stoker Lloyd realising what was going to happen ran into the sea as did a few others. The Japanese then began shooting at the escaping men. They were all killed apart from Lloyd who despite being shot managed to get away. He lost consciousness and later was washed up on the other side of the beach.

After the nurses had heard a quick succession of shots, the Japanese soldiers came back, sat down in front of the women and cleaned their bayonets and rifles. Evidence collected by historian Lynette Silver, broadcaster Tess Lawrence and biographer Barbara Angell, found that most of the nurses were then raped by these Japanese before they were murdered. Although Bullwinkel survived, she was not permitted to speak about the rapes after the war because she had been "gagged" by the Australian government. According to the Australian government, the perpetrators of the massacre remain unknown and "escaped any punishment for their crime". After the violent sexual assaults, a Japanese officer ordered the 22 nurses and one civilian woman to walk into the surf. A machine gun was set up on the beach; the women were machine-gunned when they were about waist deep in the sea. All but Bullwinkel were killed. Wounded soldiers left on stretchers were then bayoneted and killed.

When Lloyd regained consciousness he made his way back to the scene of the massacre and discovered the bodies of those who had been shot.

Bullwinkel, who had been shot in the diaphragm, lay motionless in the water until the Japanese left. She crawled into the bush and lay unconscious for several days. When she awoke, she encountered Private Cecil Gordon Kingsley, a wounded British soldier from the ship who had survived being bayoneted by the Japanese soldiers. She dressed his wounds and her own and met Stoker Lloyd. They both agreed it would be better to surrender as they couldn't survive much longer in such harsh condition. Twelve days later Bullwinkel and Kingsley surrendered to the Japanese. Kingsley died before reaching a POW camp, but Bullwinkel spent three years in one. Lloyd surrendered after them and spent the rest of the war as a POW. When his camp was liberated he ensured that the authorities knew of the surviving nurses and kept looking for them. This was instrumental in them being found as the Japanese denied any knowledge of them and their camp was deep in the jungle.

Bullwinkel survived the war and gave evidence of the massacre at the International Military Tribunal for the Far East (Tokyo War Crimes Tribunal) in 1947.

=== Perpetrators ===
The Japanese Army unit on Bangka Island at the time of the massacre was the 229th Infantry Regiment, headed by Lieutenant Colonel Iwabuchi. Iwabuchi and his subordinates were both killed by the war's end, as the regiment had been involved in heavy fighting against Australian and American forces. However, three Japanese soldiers suspected by Australian war crimes investigators of committing the massacre remained alive post-war: Captain Masaru Orita, Lieutenant Masayuki Takeuchi, and Sergeant Major Taro Kato. Takeuchi and Kato were detained in Malaya and New Guinea, respectively. However, Orita, who had since been promoted to a major, was transferred to Manchuria to fight against the Soviet Union, and in initial post-war investigations could not be found in Soviet POW camps. Orita would be found at a Soviet stockade in Siberia, and was extradited to Tokyo's Sugamo Prison in 1948. However, Orita committed suicide two days after being admitted to the prison, before he could be interrogated on the Bangka Island massacre or stand trial.

== Commemoration ==
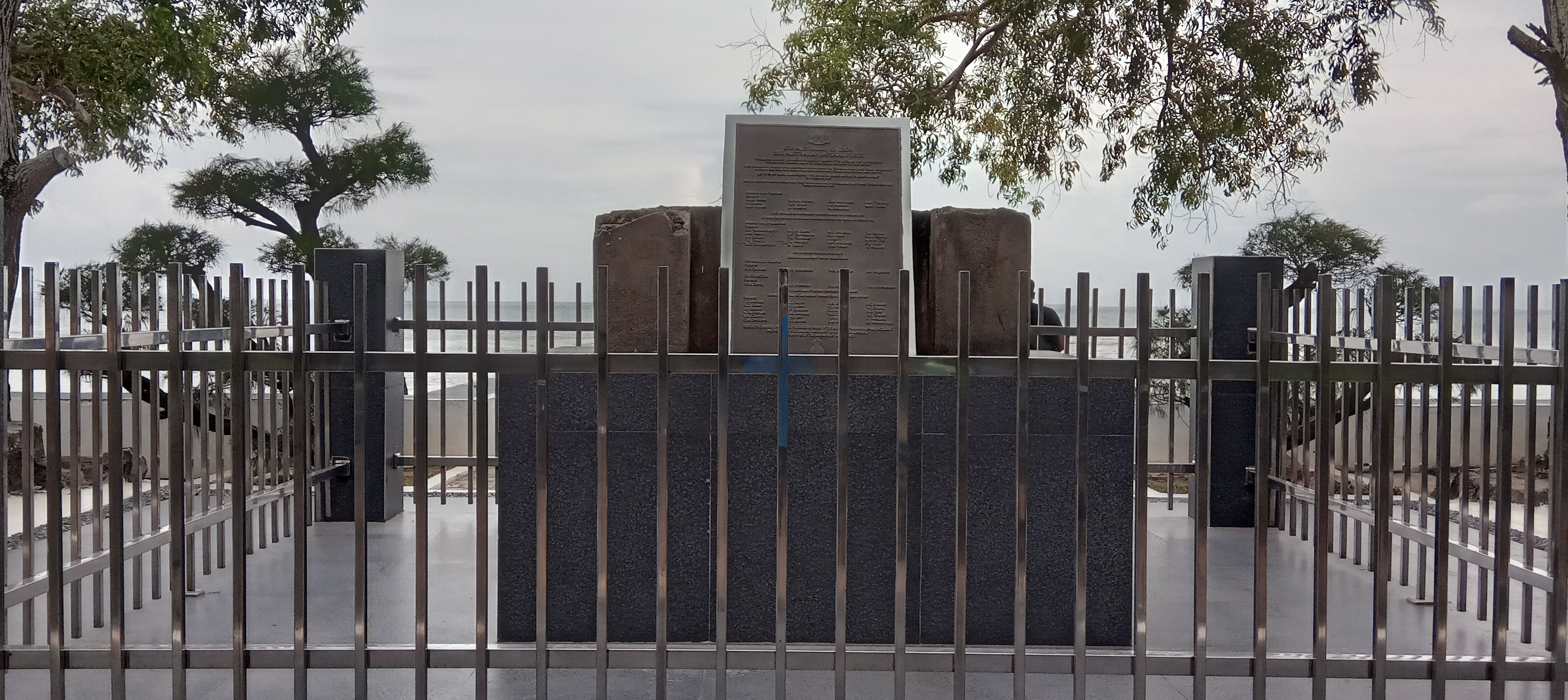
Bangka Island Massacre Memorial Monument in Mentok, Bangka Island

In South Australia an annual commemoration known as the Bangka Day Memorial Service has been held at the Women's Memorial Playing Fields, St Mary's, on the Sunday closest to 16 February since 1955. A plaque commemorating the South Australian Army Nursing Sisters who died, including Drummond and six others was erected at the site.

In 2022, on its 80th anniversary, The Australian College of Nursing Foundation announced it was establishing a scholarship in the name of each of the 21 nurses who died in the Bangka Island Massacre, in addition to leading the fundraising to erect a sculpture of Vivian Bullwinkel in the grounds of the Australian War Memorial.

A memorial for Alma Beard, one of the 22 nurses killed, was unveiled on 16 February 2022 in Toodyay, Western Australia, her home town.

== See also ==
- Clarice Halligan, killed in the massacre
