= SS Vyner Brooke =

Scottish built royal yacht of Sarawak

History

Sarawak
- Name: Vyner Brooke
- Namesake: Sir Charles Vyner Brooke
- Owner: Sarawak Steamship Co
- Operator: Ritchie & Bisset
- Port of registry: Kuching
- Route: Kuching – Singapore
- Builder: Ramage & Ferguson, Leith
- Yard number: 264
- Launched: 10 November 1927
- Completed: February 1928
- Identification: Call sign VSBJ (by 1934)
- Fate: Sunk by aircraft, 14 February 1942

General characteristics
- Tonnage: 1,670 GRT, 713 NRT
- Length: 240.7 ft (73.4 m)
- Beam: 41.3 ft (12.6 m)
- Draught: 16 ft 2 3/4 in (4.95 m)
- Depth: 16.1 ft (4.9 m)
- Decks: 1
- Installed power: 297 NHP
- Propulsion: 2 × triple-expansion engines; 2 × screws
- Speed: 12 knots (22 km/h)
- Capacity: 44 × 1st class passengers; 200+ × deck passengers
- Notes: royal yacht

SS Vyner Brooke was a Scottish-built steamship that was both the royal yacht of Sarawak and a merchant ship frequently used between Singapore and Kuching. She was named after the 3rd Rajah of Sarawak, Sir Charles Vyner Brooke. At the outbreak of war with Japan, the Royal Navy requisitioned and armed her. She was sunk by Japanese aircraft in 1942.

== Description ==
The naval architect FG Ritchie, of Ritchie & Bisset, Singapore, designed the ship, and Ramage & Ferguson of Leith built her. The Ranee of Sarawak launched her on 10 November 1927, and she was completed in February 1928. The ship sailed from Leith for Singapore on 17 April 1928.

Her registered length was 240.7 ft (73.4 m), her beam was 41.3 ft (12.6 m), her depth was 16.1 ft (4.9 m), and her draught was 16 ft 2 3/4 in (4.95 m). Her tonnages were 1,670 GRT and 713 NRT. Cargo was handled by two three-ton cranes at each hatch, and one 20-ton derrick.

Vyner Brooke was flush-decked, with 'tween decks, all sheathed in 2.5-inch (6.4 cm) steel, with six watertight bulkheads. The main deck was as clear as possible of structures, for deck passenger use with accommodations forward for crew and aft for stewards, clerks and ship's boys. The refrigeration plant, designed to keep the cold store two degrees below freezing, was on the main deck. First class cabins amidships on the upper deck provided berths for 44 passengers, with a 40 ft × 24 ft (12.2 m × 7.3 m) saloon forward of the cabins. A staircase at the after end of the saloon led to a shade deck and two de luxe cabins and a private sitting room. The ship was equipped with wireless telegraphy. She carried lifeboats, rafts and lifebelts for 650 people and could carry at least 200 deck passengers.

She had six corrugated furnaces with a combined grate area of 124 square feet (12 m^{2}) that heated two single-ended Barclay, Curle & Co. boilers with a combined heating surface of 4,390 square feet (408 m^{2}). These fed steam at 180 lb_{f}/in^{2} to a three-cylinder triple expansion steam engine built by Ramage and Ferguson. The engine was rated at 297 NHP and drove twin screws.

== Royal Navy requisition ==
When Japan entered World War II the Royal Navy requisitioned Vyner Brooke. She was painted grey, and armed with a four-inch deck gun forward, two Lewis guns aft, and depth charges, and commissioned as HMS Vyner Brooke. Her Australian and British officers were mostly Malay Royal Navy Volunteer Reserve, and were asked to remain aboard. The ship's company, under the command of her peacetime captain, Richard E Borton, was augmented by reservists, some survivors of HMS Prince of Wales and Repulse, and European and Malay professional seafarers.

== Sinking and massacre ==
On 14 February 1942, while evacuating nurses and wounded servicemen away from Singapore she was bombed by Japanese aircraft and sunk. Some of the survivors who reached Bangka Island east of Sumatra in the Dutch East Indies were massacred by the Imperial Japanese Army. Others were imprisoned in Palembang and Muntok POW camps.
