= List of Old Geelong Grammarians =

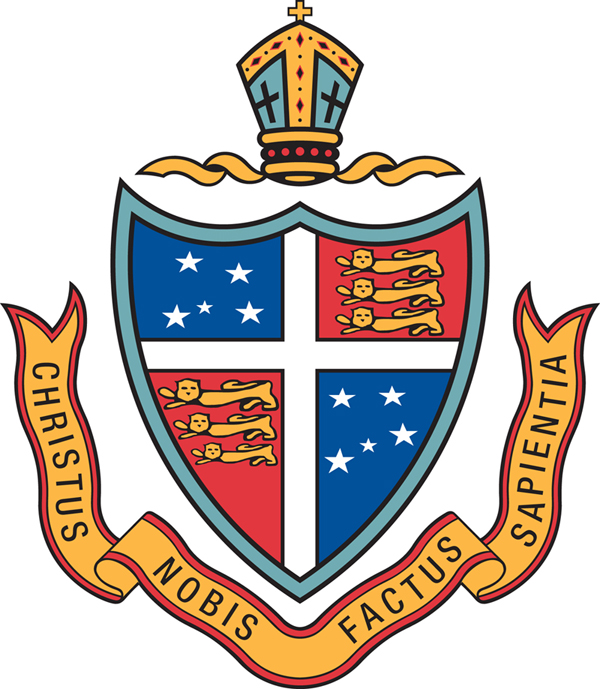

This is a list of notable Old Geelong Grammarians, they being notable former students – known as "Old Geelong Grammarians" of the Anglican Church school, Geelong Grammar School and old girls of The Hermitage and Clyde School in Geelong, Victoria, Australia.

In 2001, The Sun-Herald ranked Geelong Grammar School fourth in Australia's top ten schools for boys, based on the number of its male alumni mentioned in the Who's Who in Australia (a listing of notable Australians).

== Academia ==
Name	Notability	Ref
David Armstrong AO, FAHA	Professor Emeritus of Philosophy at the University of Sydney	
Alec Broers, Baron Broers FRS, FMedSci, FREng	Former President of the Royal Academy of Engineering (2001–2006), former Vice-Chancellor of the University of Cambridge (1996–2003)	
David Cockayne FRS,	Professor of physical examination of materials at University of Oxford (2000–2010) and president of the International Federation of Societies for Microscopy (2003–2007)	
Alistair Crombie	Head of the Department of the History and Philosophy of Science at Oxford University	
Dr. Frank Cumbrae-Stewart KC	Foundation registrar and librarian of the University of Queensland	
Maude Kathleen Deasey	Senior officer in the Australian Women's Army Service and teacher	
Maj. David Dexter	Military historian, commando, diplomat, and university administrator	
Thomas Sergeant Hall	Geologist, biologist and recipient of The Murchison Fund	
Charles Leonard Hamblin	Professor of philosophy, logician, and computer pioneer	
Patience Hawker	Co-founded the Stawell School for girls in South Australia	
Jeremy Griffith	Biologist and author	
Alexander Charles David Drogo Montagu	13th Duke of Manchester	
Graham Pizzey AM	Ornithologist	
Ted Ringwood FRS, FAA	Experimental geophysicist and geochemist; recipient of the Wollaston Medal	
Herman Rupp	Clergyman and botanist; recipient of the Clarke Medal	
Michael Scriven	Scientific philosopher	
Dr. Richard Searby AO, KC	Former Chancellor of Deakin University	
Helen Tippett OBE	Architecture academic; first woman president of New Zealand Institute of Architects and first woman dean at Victoria University of Wellington	

== Business ==
Name	Notability	Ref
Peter Alexander	Fashion designer	
Sir Roderick Carnegie AC	Businessman	
James Fairfax AC	Philanthropist	
Sir Warwick Fairfax	Businessman and philanthropist	
Sir Hudson Fysh KBE, DFC	Aviator (rank of Squadron Leader) and businessman; a founder of Qantas	
Peter Holmes à Court	Businessman and former co-owner of South Sydney Rabbitohs	
Simon Holmes à Court	Businessman	
Donald McGauchie AO	Farmer, company director and businessman	
Hugh Morgan AC	Businessman	
Dame Elisabeth Murdoch AC, DBE	Philanthropist	
Rupert Murdoch AC	Media proprietor; owner of News Corp	
Lt. Ken Myer AC, DSC, RAN	Diplomat, administrator, businessman and philanthropist; nominated to succeed Sir Paul Hasluck as Governor-General	
Baillieu Myer AC	Businessman and philanthropist	
Clyde Packer	Publishing and media figure and former member of the New South Wales Legislative Council (1964-1976)	
Kerry Packer AC	Publishing, media and gaming tycoon; founder of World Series Cricket	
Harry Perkins AO	Farmer, businessman, and philanthropist	
Jonathan Shier	Television executive	

== Clergy ==
Name	Notability	Ref
Bishop Thomas Armstrong	Bishop of Wangaratta (1902–1927)	
Bishop Reginald Stephen	Bishop of Tasmania (1914–1919) and Bishop of Newcastle (1919–1928)	
Bishop Jack Stretch	Bishop of Newcastle (1906–1919)	

== Media, entertainment and the arts ==
Name	Notability	Ref
Jean Battersby (née Robinson) AO	Founding CEO of the Australia Council for the Arts	
John Beswicke	Architect	
Tim Burstall AM	Filmmaker known for Alvin Purple	
Peter Carey AO	Novelist and winner of the Booker Prize	
David Chipp	Journalist	
Caroline Craig	Actress known for playing Tess Gallagher in Blue Heelers	
Vadim Dale	Outback Jack contestant	
Beatrice Darbyshire	Artist	
Ian Darling	Documentarian	
Portia de Rossi	Actress	
Sir Russell Drysdale AC	Painter	
Keith Dunstan OAM	Journalist and author	
Marta Dusseldorp	Actress	
Michael Duffield	Actor	
Geoffrey Dutton AO	Poet	
Ronald Falk	Actor	
Simon Fieldhouse	Artist	
Greg Fleet	Comedian and actor	
Helen Garner	Novelist and journalist	
Tim Hewat	Journalist and television producer	
Missy Higgins	Singer-songwriter	
Rebecca Hossack	Gallerist specialising in Indigenous Australian art	
Norman Kaye	Organist and actor	
Joan Lindsay	Author	
Tony Llewellyn-Jones	Actor	
Tom Long	Actor	
Ranald Macdonald AO	Publisher, broadcaster, football president, and academic	
John Manifold AM	Poet	
Ali McGregor	Opera singer, actress, and cabaret performer	
David Montalto	Craftsman, engraver and painter	
David Moore	Photojournalist	
Stephen Murray-Smith AM	Writer, editor, and educator	
Cynthia Reed Nolan	Journalist and gallerist	
Andrew Olle	Radio and television presenter	
Arthur Purnell	Architect	
Robin Ramsay	Actor	
John Reed	Art editor and patron	
Sblt. Peter Smith RAN	Painter	
Ian Sprague	Ceramic sculptor and graphic artist	
David Strachan	Painter	
Sam Strong	Theatre director	
Camille Summers-Valli	Artist, director and photographer	
François Tétaz	Musician, producer, and Grammy winner	
Nat Thaipun	Television cook and barista	
Daniel Thomas AM	Art historian, curator, writer, art critic, and museum director	
Charlie Vickers	Actor known for playing Sauron in The Lord of the Rings: The Rings of Power	
Michael Winchester	Actor	

== Military ==
Name	Notability	Ref
2LT Bertram Armytage	Soldier and explorer who was part of the Nimrod Expedition	
Capt. Arthur Bagot GC, DSC	Naval officer and Albert Medal recipient	
Sqn Ldr James Catanach DFC	World War II bomber pilot and prisoner of war	
Brig. Sydney Christian CMG	Australian Army colonel during the first World War	
AVM Adrian Cole CBE, DSO, MC, DFC	Senior commander in the Royal Australian Air Force	
Flt Lt. Roberts Dunstan DFC	World War II soldier and airman, served as an air gunner after losing a leg in action with the Army	
Gen. Sir John Hackett GCB, CBE, DSO & Bar, MC	British Army general, later author and Principal of the King's College London	
VADM Justin Jones , ,	Royal Australian Navy senior officer, Chief of Joint Operations (2024–present)	
Geoffrey Lemprière OBE	Soldier and prisoner of war during World War II, and woolbuyer	
VADM Ian McIntosh KBE, CB, DSO, DSC	Royal Navy officer and Deputy Chief of the Defence Staff (Operational Requirements)	
Deputy Assistant Adjutant General Beryl Noble	Officer in the Australian Women's Army Service	
ADML Sir Anthony Synnot KBE, AO, RAN	Royal Australian Navy admiral	

== Politics ==
Name	Notability	Ref
Harry Armytage AO	MLA (1889–1894)	
Sir John Atwill	Barrister and president of the Liberal Party of Australia (1975–1982)	
Austin Austin	MLA (Lib and Nationalist, 1902–1904 and 1910–1925)	
Edward Austin	MLA (UAP, 1932–1935)	
Edwin Austin	MLA (Conservative, 1892–1900 and 1906–1909)	
Sblt. Tom Austin	MLA (Lib., 1972–1976 and 1976–1992)	
Guy Barnett MP	Senator (2002–2010), Tasmanian House of Assembly (Lib, 2014–present), Attorney-General of Tasmania (2023–present), and Deputy Premier of Tasmania (2024–present)	
Lt Col. John Bloomfield	MLA (Lib., 1953–1970)	
William Bridges-Maxwell	MHR (Lib, 1964–1969) and veterinary scientist	
Geoffrey Brown MBE	MHR (Lib, 1949–1955)	
Joseph Tilley Brown	MLA (Protectionist, 1886–1889), MHR (Anti-Socialist, 1906–1910)	
John Cameron	MLA (Ministerialist, 1893–1896 and 1901–1908)	
Digby Crozier	MLC (Lib., 1973–1985) and MLA (1985–1988)	
Georgie Crozier	MLC (Lib., 2010–present)	
William Cumming	MLA (UAP and Lib, 1935–1945), Minister of Agriculture (Oct–Nov 1945)	
Sir John Mark Davies KCMG	MLC (1889–1919), Attorney-General of Victoria (1903–1909) and President of the Victorian Legislative Council (1910–1919)	
Sir Matthew Davies	MLA (1883–1892) and Speaker of the Victorian Legislative Assembly (1887–1892)	
Dick de Fegely	MLA (Lib., 1985–1989)	
Alexander Downer AC	MHR (Lib, 1984–2008), Leader of the Opposition (1994–1995), Foreign Minister (1996–2007), High Commissioner to the United Kingdom (2014–2018)	
Sir Alick Downer KBE	MHR (Lib, 1949–1963), Minister for Immigration (1958–1964), High Commissioner to the United Kingdom (1964–1972)	
Flt Lt. Sir David Fairbairn KBE, DFC	MHR (Lib, 1949–1975), Minister for Air (1962–1964), National Development (1964–1969), Education and Science (1971) and Defence (1971–1972), Ambassador to the Netherlands (1977–1980)	
Sir George Fairbairn	MHR (1906–1913) and Senator (1917–1923)	
James Fairbairn	MHR (UAP, 1933–1940), Minister for Civil Aviation, Air and Vice-President of the Executive Council (1939–1940); killed in the Canberra air disaster	
Franc Falkiner	MHR (CLP [1913–1914] and Nationalist [1917–1919])	
Norman Falkiner	MLC (Nationalist, 1928–1929)	
Otway Falkiner	MLC (Country, 1946–1978)	
Lt. Archibald Fisken CMG, OBE, MC	MHR (UAP; 1934–1937)	
Bill Forwood	MLC (Lib., 1992–2006)	
Malcolm Fraser AC, CH, GCL	MHR (Lib; 1955–1983), Prime Minister of Australia (1975–1983)	
Tamie Fraser AO	Wife of Prime Minister of Australia Malcolm Fraser; founder and president of The Australiana Fund (1978–1983)	
Geoffrey Giles	MHR (Lib; 1977–1983)	
Sir John Gorton GCMG, AC, CH	Senator and MHR (Lib, 1949–1975), Prime Minister of Australia (1968–1971)	
James Guest	MLC (Lib., 1976–1996)	
Maj Jo Gullett AM, MC	MHR (Lib, 1946–1955), diplomat, journalist, and soldier	
Nik Hafimi	Member of the Legislative Council of Brunei (2017–2022) and businessperson	
Capt. David Hamer AM, DSC, RAN	MHR (Lib, 1969–1974; 1975–1977) and Senator (Lib; 1978–1990)	
Col. Sir Rupert Hamer AC, KCMG, ED	MLC (Lib, 1978–1981) MLA (Lib, 1971–1981), Premier of Victoria (1972–1981)	
Charles Hardy	Senator (Country, 1932–1938)	
Brian Harrison DL	MP (Tory, 1955–1974)	
Charles Hawker	MHR (Nationalist & UAP, 1929–38) and eponym of the Hawker Scholarship	
David Hawker AO	MHR (Lib, 1983–2010) and Speaker of the Australian House of Representatives (2004–2007)	
William Hood	MLA (1898–1899)	
Sir Peter Hordern DL, PC	MP (Tory, 1964–1993)	
Lt. John Howse	MHR (Lib, 1946–1960)	
George Jones MP	Member of the New Zealand House of Representatives (1880–1881) and Legislative Council (1895–1920)	
Jonas Levien	MLA (1871–1877 and 1880–1906)	
Sandy Mackenzie AM	MHR (Nationalist, 1975–1983)	
Dan Mackinnon CBE	MHR (Lib; 1949–1951 and 1953–1966) and Ambassador to Argentina (1967–1970)	
Donald Mackinnon	MLA (Lib, 1900–1920) and Attorney-General and Solicitor-General of Victoria (1913-1915)	
Donald James Mackinnon	MLA (Lib, 1976–1982)	
James Manifold	MHR (Protectionist, Lib and Nationialist; 1901–1903 and 1913–1918)	
Sir Thomas Manifold KBE	MLC (Nationialist, 1929–1935; without portfolio, 1932–1933)	
Richard Marles MP	MHR (ALP, 2007–present), Minister for Trade (Jun–Sep 2013), Deputy Leader of the Opposition (2019–2022), Deputy Prime Minister and Minister for Defence (2022–present)	
Thomas Parkin	Member of the Creswick Shire Council and MLA (UAP, 1935–1936)	
Thomas Payne	MLC (Lib, Nationalist and without portfolio; 1901–1904, 1904–1928)	
Charles Perkins MP	Western Australia MLA (Country, 1942–1961), Minister for Transport, Police, Labour and Native Welfare (1959–1961)	
Jim Plowman MP	MLA (Lib, 1973–1982 and 1985–1999), Speaker of the Victorian Legislative Assembly (1979–1982 and 1996–1999), Minister for Energy and Minerals (1992–1996)	
Tony Plowman	MLA (Lib, 1992–2006)	
Simon Ramsay	MLC (Lib, 2010–2018)	
William Robertson	Colonial barrister and politician	
Peter Ross-Edwards AM	MLA (Nationalist, 1967–1991) and former leader of the National Party in the Victorian Parliament (1970–1988)	
Lt Col. Rupert Ryan CMG, DSO	MHR (UAP and Lib, 1940–1952)	
Ian Smith	MLA (Lib, 1967–1983 and 1985–1999), Minister for Social Welfare (1970–73), Agriculture (1973–1980), Economic Development (1980–81) and Finance (1992–1995)	
Charles Sommers	Western Australia MLA (Lib, 1906–1918) and Minister for Lands (1901)	
Sir Robert Southey AO, CMG	President of the Liberals (1970–1975), Chairman of the Australian Ballet Foundation (1980–1990)	
Garry Spry	MLA (Lib, 1992–2002)	
George Story	Queensland MLA (1896-1904)	
Air Cmde Sir Peter Vanneck GBE, CB, AFC, AE, DL	Lord Mayor of London (1977) and Member of the European Parliament (1979–1989)	
Mechai Viravaidya	Thai politician and activist	
Arthur Whittingham	Queensland MLA (1912–1922)	
David Wordsworth	Western Australia MLA (Lib, 1971–1989), Minister for Transport (1977–1978), Lands and Forests (1978–1982)	
Sid Vashist	Mayor of the Barkly Regional Council (2024–present)	

== Public service and the law ==
Name	Notability	Ref
Will Alstergren AO	Chief Justice of the Family Court of Australia (2018–present)	
Peter Barbour	Director-General of Security at ASIO (1970–1975)	
Justice Sir Charles Belcher OBE	Australian lawyer, author, British colonial jurist, and amateur ornithologist	
Stephen Charles AO	Jurist who sat on the Supreme Court of Victoria (1995–2006)	
Michael Cook AO	Director-general of the Office of National Assessments (1981–1989) and Ambassador of Australia to the United States (1989–1993)	
Barrie Dexter CBE	Senior public servant and diplomat, Secretary of the Department of Aboriginal Affairs (1973–1977) and High Commissioner to Canada (1980–1983)	
John McLaren Emmerson	Barrister, physicist and book collector	
Lt Col. Sir David Hay CBE, DSO	Senior public servant and diplomat, Secretary of the Department of Aboriginal Affairs (1977–1979) and High Commissioner to Canada (1961–1964)	
Peter Henderson AC	Secretary of Department of Foreign Affairs (1979–1984)	
Henry Sandford King	Geographer and Surveyor General of Western Australia (1918–1923)	
Sir Edward Fancourt Mitchell KCMG, KC	Barrister and expert in Australian constitutional law	
Simon Molesworth AO, KC	Barrister and solicitor	
Audrey Cummins Morphett OBE	Community worker and historian	
Francis Hamilton Stuart	Diplomat	
Michael Thawley AO	Senior public servant and diplomat, Secretary of the Department of the Prime Minister and Cabinet (2014–2016) and Ambassador to the United States (2000–2005)	
Michael Thwaites AO	Director of Counter-Espionage ASIO and poet	
Richard Woolcott AC	Senior public servant and diplomat, Secretary of the Department of Foreign Affairs and Trade (1988–1992) and Ambassador to Indonesia (1975–1978)	
Justice Sir John Young AC, KCMG	Chief Justice of the Supreme Court of Victoria (1974–91), the Lieutenant-Governor of Victoria (1974–95), and the Chief Scout of Australia (1989–96)	

== Royalty ==
Name	Notability	Ref
Sultan Mizan Zainal Abidin	Sultan of Terengganu (1998–present), King of Malaysia (2006–2011)	
King Charles III KG, KT, GCB, OM, AK, QSO, PC	King of Australia, the United Kingdom and 13 other Commonwealth Realms (2022–present)	
Prince Chatrichalerm Yukol	Thai royal, filmmaker	
Mateen bin Javed Al Nahyan		

== Science and medicine ==
Name	Notability	Ref
David Ames AO	Psychiatrist, particularly in the field of dementia and the mental health of older persons	
Arthur Graham Brown	Medical doctor and amateur ornithologist	
Gordon Hamilton Fairley , FRCP	Cancer researcher	
James W. Lance CBE, AO	Neurologist, particularly in the field of headache and migraine	
Jeremy David Pickett-Heaps FAA, FRS	Biologist	
John Gordon Rushbrooke	Particle physicist	

== Sport ==
Name	Notability	Ref
Sgt. Gerald Backhouse	Olympic runner at the 1936 Berlin Games and 1938 Empire Games	
William Bailey	Cricketer for Victoria	
Pte. Norman Belcher	Footballer for Geelong and Essendon in the VFL	
Capt. John Bell	Footballer for Geelong in the VFL	
Jon Berney	World champion lightweight rower	
Jarrod Brander	Footballer for the West Coast Eagles and Greater Western Sydney Giants in the AFL	
Sblt. Jeff Brisbane	Footballer for Geelong in the VFL	
Tom Brown	Footballer for Richmond in the AFL	
Tanner Bruhn	Footballer for Geelong in the AFL	
Meyrick Buchanan	Footballer for Werribee and Footscray in the AFL and former cricketer for Melbourne	
Jye Caldwell	Footballer for Greater Western Sydney and Essendon in the AFL	
Ossie Calvert	Footballer for Geelong in the VFL	
Jane Chapple-Hyam	Racehorse trainer	
David A. Clarke	Footballer for Geelong and Carlton in the AFL	
Toby Conway	Footballer for Geelong in the AFL	
David Cordner	Footballer for Melbourne and Sydney in the AFL	
Sblt. Thomas Cree DSC	Olympic rower for Great Britain	
Brent Daniels	Footballer for Greater Western Sydney in the AFL	
Troy Davis	Footballer for Melbourne	
Norman Davison	Footballer for Geelong in the VFL	
Ernest de Little	First-class cricketer and pastoralist	
Jack Dore	Footballer for Geelong in the VFL	
Colin Douglas-Smith	Olympic rower and leading obstetrician	
Paddy Dow	Footballer for Carlton and St Kilda in the AFL	
Thomson Dow	Footballer for Richmond in the AFL	
Les Fairbairn	Footballer for Geelong in the VFL	
Steve Fairbairn	Rower and rowing coach	
Charlie Gardiner	Footballer for Geelong and St Kilda in the AFL	
Sqn Ldr Tony Gaze DFC & Two Bars, OAM	Racing driver and World War II fighter ace	
Norman Good	First class cricketer for Western Australia and footballer for Melbourne University	
Alby Green	First class cricketer for South Australia and footballer for Geelong and Norwoods in the SAFA; inaugural Magarey Medal winner	
Mia Gross	Olympic sprinter for Australia	
Peter Hall	First-class cricketer for Cambridge University and Otago	
Peter Hatzoglou	Cricketer for Melbourne, South Australia, Perth, and Hobart	
Oliver Hollands	Footballer for Carlton in the AFL	
Tayla Honey	Netballer for Melbourne	
Jim Howden	Olympic rower	
Eddy James	Footballer for Geelong	
Bob Joyce	Olympic hurdler	
Rebecca Joyce	Olympic rower	
John Kelly	Olympic equestrian gold medallist	
Capt. Wallscourt Kelly	First-class cricketer for the Europeans	
Brodie Kemp	Footballer for Carlton in the AFL	
Sam Lalor	Footballer for Richmond in the AFL	
Jock Landale	Basketball player for the Memphis Grizzlies in the NBA and for Australia's national team; Olympian	
John Landy AC, CVO, MBE, FTSE	Runner and Governor of Victoria (2001–2006)	
Sam Lloyd	Footballer for Richmond and Footscray in the AFL	
Noah Long	Footballer for Perth in the AFL	
Ollie Lord	Footballer for Port Adelaide in the AFL	
James Lowe	Olympic rower	
Ariana Luamanu	Samoan netballer	
Tim Macartney-Snape AM	Mountaineer and first Australian to climb Mount Everest and the first person to climb the full height (sea level to summit) of Mount Everest, both without supplemental oxygen	
James MacKinnon	First-class cricketer for Cambridge University	
Emily Mannix	Netballer for the Melbourne Vixens	
Paddy McCartin	Footballer for St Kilda and Sydney in the AFL	
Lt. Samuel McCaughey	First-class cricketer for Cambridge University	
Arthur McKenzie	Footballer for Geelong in the AFL	
James Mann	First-class cricketer for Cambridge University	
Garth Manton	Olympic rower	
Adrian Monger	Olympic rower	
Nina Morrison	Footballer for Geelong in the AFLW	
Craig Mottram	Long distance runner	
Sam Newman	Footballer for Geelong in the VFL and longtime panelist on the Footy Show	
Lochie O'Brien	Footballer for Carlton	
Billy Orchard MC	Footballer for Geelong in the VFL	
Jack Parkin	Footballer for Geelong	
Bill Patterson	Motor racing driver, race team owner and businessman	
Oliver Peake	Cricketer for Victoria and Melbourne	
Cameron Rahles-Rahbula	Paralympic alpine skier and 2014 Young Victorian of the Year	
Arthur Reed	Footballer for Geelong in the VFL	
Maj. Alex Russell MC	Grazier, soldier, golfer and golf course architect	
Lauren Ryan	Olympic long-distance runner	
Caleb Serong	Footballer for the Fremantle	
Jai Serong	Footballer for Hawthorn in the AFL	
Jamieson Sheahan	Football player for Winnipeg in the Canadian Football League	
Joe Shelley	Footballer for University in the VFL	
Kate Slatter OAM	Olympic rowing gold medallist	
Billie Smedts	Footballer for Geelong	
Dennis Smith	Test cricketer for New Zealand	
Devon Smith	Footballer for Essendon	
Nick Stevens	Former footballer for Port Adelaide and Carlton in the AFL and former Glenelg coach	
Charlotte Sutherland	Rower	
James Sutherland	Former first-class cricketer, former CEO of Australian Cricket Board (2001-2018) and current CEO of Golf Australia (2020–present)	
Ian Toyne	Footballer for Geelong and Melbourne	
John Turnbull	Rower for England	
Easton Wood	Former footballer for Footscray	

== See also ==
- List of schools in Victoria
- List of boarding schools
- Associated Public Schools of Victoria
