= Gina Jones =

New Zealand architect

- Born: Christchurch
- Education: University of Auckland, RMIT University
- Occupations: Architect, artist
- Awards: Helen Tippett Memorial Award
- Practice: TWIA Architects, Accent Architects

Gina Jones is a New Zealand architect. She is the chair of the New Zealand Registered Architects Board and the co-founder of the National Association of Women in Construction.

== Biography ==
Jones was born in Christchurch. She attended Onslow College in Wellington. In the 1980s she completed a Bachelor of Architecture and a Bachelor of Building Science at Victoria University of Wellington. She later studied heritage building at the University of Canberra.

Jones began her career at TWIA Architects, and from 1984 to 1994 she was a director of Ampersand Architects. She set up her own practice, Accent Architects, in 1995. She is a fellow of the New Zealand Institute of Architects and has also taught professional practice for the postgraduate architecture programme at Victoria University of Wellington.

Jones was national president of the New Zealand Institute of Building (1998–2001) and the National Association of Women in Construction (New Zealand) (2012–2013), and chair of the New Zealand Registered Architects Board. In 1996 she co-founded the New Zealand chapter of the American organisation, the National Association of Women in Construction.

=== Portfolio ===
Jones' work includes:

- Redevelopment of the former Rothmans tobacco warehouse site in Napier
- Campus redesign at Queen Margaret College in Thorndon, Wellington since 1984
- Site redevelopment at St John's Church, Willis Street, Wellington
- Redevelopment of Hyam's Building in Wakefield Street, Wellington
- Redevelopment of Wesley Church in Taranaki Street, Wellington
- Exterior refurbishment of Government House, Wellington

=== Awards and recognition ===
In 2006, Jones was the co-winner of the Helen Tippett Memorial Award for her contribution to the construction industry across the decade 1996 to 2006. In 2009, Jones received the New Zealand Institute of Building Medal; she was the second woman to receive the medal, after Helen Tippett.

In 2011, she was awarded a lifetime achievement award by the National Association of Women in Construction (New Zealand).

== Personal life ==
Jones has a home in Greytown, north of Wellington, and is a trustee of the Greytown Heritage Trust.

Jones also works as an artist, making pieces that incorporate LED lights. In 2005 she completed a master's degree in fine arts at RMIT University in Melbourne, Australia. She has been a finalist in the Wallace Art Awards three times, and also in the Waikato Contemporary Art Awards and the Norsewear Art Awards. She received a merit award at the 2011 New Zealand Painting and Printmaking Awards.
