= Charles Fisher (headmaster) =

Australian headmaster

The Hon Charles Douglas Fisher
- Born: 8 October 1921; Repton, England
- Died: 5 December 1978 (aged 57); Kanumbra, Australia
- Education: Marlborough College; Keble College, Oxford
- Occupations: Headmaster; Scotch College, Adelaide; Headmaster; Church of England Grammar School, Brisbane; Headmaster; Geelong Grammar School
- Spouse(s): Anne Gilmour, née Hammond
- Children: Four sons, two daughters
- Parent(s): Geoffrey Fisher; Rosamond Chevallier, née Forman

The Hon Charles Douglas Fisher (8 October 1921 – 5 December 1978) was the English-born Australian headmaster of Scotch College, Adelaide (1962–1969), Church of England Grammar School, Brisbane (1970–1973) and Geelong Grammar School (1974–1978).

== Early life ==
Fisher was born in 1921 in Repton, Derbyshire, the son of the Rev Geoffrey Fisher (1887–1972) and his wife Rosamond Chevallier (née Forman) (1890–1986). At the time of his birth Geoffrey Fisher was the headmaster of Repton School; he would subsequently be appointed Archbishop of Canterbury. An older brother, Henry, would become a High Court judge, Henry Fisher.

The young Charles was educated at Marlborough College and was then commissioned into the Royal Regiment of Artillery in 1941. After the War, he studied at Keble College, Oxford (BA 1948, MA 1953).

== Career ==
Fisher began his teaching career at Harrow (1948–1955). His wife, whom he had married in 1952, was from Southern Rhodesia, and from 1955 to 1961 Fisher was senior master at Peterhouse at Marandellas. Returning briefly to England, he taught at Kent College, Canterbury and Sherborne School, before emigrating to Australia in 1962 to become headmaster of Scotch College, Adelaide, travelling on the SS Oronsay. In retirement, Lord Fisher (as Geoffrey Fisher was by then) lived for a time with his son in Adelaide. Charles Fisher was then successively headmaster of Church of England Grammar School, Brisbane, (1970–1973) and Geelong Grammar School (1974–1978). In 1976, under Fisher, Geelong Grammar became fully co-educational by merging with The Hermitage and Clyde School.

Fisher Library at Geelong Grammar is named after him. (It is not to be confused with Fisher Library, at the University of Sydney, which is named after a benefactor, Thomas Fisher.) The chapel at Scotch College, Adelaide, which Fisher had built, was renamed the Charles Fisher Memorial Chapel. There is a tablet to Fisher's memory at St Andrew's Church, Trent, Dorset, where both his parents are buried.

== Personal life ==
In 1952 Fisher married Anne Gilmour Hammond at Canterbury Cathedral. They had four sons and two daughters.

Fisher died in 1978, when, en route to Timbertop, his car hit a tree near Kanumbra. He was cremated. In 1983 his widow remarried, to the scientist Basil Hetzel.
