= Norman Davidson =

Norman Davidson may refer to:

- Norman Davidson (biochemist) (1911–1972), Scottish biochemist, pioneer molecular biologist
- Norman Davidson (biologist) (1916–2002), American biologist
- Norman Davidson (rugby union) (1931–2024), Scottish cricketer and rugby union player
- Norrie Davidson (born 1934), Scottish footballer

== See also ==
- Norman Davison (1907–1990), politician
- Norman Davison (footballer) (1888–1958), Australian rules footballer
