= Scotch College, Adelaide =

Scotch College

Location
- Torrens Park, South Australia; Australia; 34°58′55″S 138°36′57″E

Information
- Type: Independent, co-educational, day & boarding
- Motto: Scientia, Humanitas, Religio
- Denomination: Uniting Church (formerly Presbyterian)
- Established: 1919
- Chairman: Todd Roberts
- Principal: Trent Driver
- Enrolment: 1030 (P–12)
- Colours: Blue & gold
- Slogan: One School
- Mascot: Lion rampant
- Affiliation: Sports Association for Adelaide Schools; Independent Girls Schools Sports Association
- Alumni: Old Collegians
- Website: www.scotch.sa.edu.au

Reunion marking the 50th anniversary of the wartime use of Birralee and neighbouring Brierly Lodge by Scotch College. (May 1992)

Scotch College is an independent, Uniting Church, co-educational, day and boarding school, the bulk being in Torrens Park with a nearby junior school campus in Mitcham, inner-southern suburbs of Adelaide, South Australia.

Founded in 1919 out of the earlier Kyre College (1902–1918), and incorporated under an Act of Parliament in 1922, Scotch currently caters for approximately 1,000 students including more than 100 boarders in Years 7 to 12.

Scotch College is affiliated with the Headmasters' and Headmistresses' Conference, the Association of Heads of Independent Schools of Australia (AHISA), the Association of Independent Schools of South Australia (AISSA), the Australian Boarding Schools' Association (ABSA), the Junior School Heads Association of Australia (JSHAA), the Independent Schools Sport Association (ISSA) and the Independent Girls' Schools Sport Association (IGSSA).

On 4 September 2014, it was announced that John Newton would become the Principal from January 2015 for 5 years. He was previously headmaster of Taunton School in the UK. In 2021, he announced his upcoming retirement.

== History ==
Scotch College was founded as a Presbyterian school for boys, a niche that was not served in South Australia previously.

In the late 19th Century, there were several attempts to found a Presbyterian boys school in South Australia. At the time, Presbyterianism was the fifth largest religion in the colony, after Anglicanism, Roman Catholicism, Congregationalism, and Methodism. Only 5–10% of the colony's inhabitants belonged to that denomination. Many of the larger denominations already had private schools, such as St Peter's College and Pulteney Grammar School (Anglican), and Prince Alfred College (Methodist). Although Scotch College, Melbourne had been successfully running as a Presbyterian boys school in Victoria since 1851, funding shortages prevented the funding of a South Australian Presbyterian school until later. One reason for the delay was that early funds raised for Scotch College were diverted to found the University of Adelaide instead.

In 1902, Kyre College, which would eventually become Scotch College, was founded by David Henry Hollidge (1868–1963) in Malvern and in 1903 moved to Unley Park. The first classes were held in a rented house. The school grew quickly and prospered until about 1913, after which enrolments declined as a result of an agricultural downturn and eventually World War I. Nearly 250 affiliates of Kyre College fought in the war. The Kyre College logo was oval in shape, coloured blue and gold, with a central shield containing images of a book, a lamp, a beehive, and crossed cricket bats, separated by a Christian cross. Above the shield was the Lion Rampant that would become the mascot of Scotch College. Similarly, blue and gold would become the Scotch College school colours.

Kyre College picnic at Glenelg, 1908

In the meantime, the idea of founding an independent Presbyterian boys school remained popular, and funding was finally secured after the War after persistent leadership and fundraising by John Seymour, a Presbyterian minister, who also helped to found Presbyterian Ladies College, now Seymour College. According to the College's 1922 incorporation, the initial funds were provided by "members of the Presbyterian Church of South Australia and of the South Australian Caledonian Society and of the Lothian Club, Adelaide, and by other persons interested in providing a college for boys of Scotch parentage and descent."

In 1918, Kyre College became Scotch College and first operated under that name in 1919. The re-formed school was initially called Kyre Scotch College. An enduring legend associated with the College is that it was founded in the memory of the "Sons of Scotland who fought and died in The Great War of 1914–1918". The first headmaster was Norman Gratton, previously a Presbyterian Church elder, and the College officially incorporated under an Act of Parliament in 1922. The following excerpts from the 1922 Scotch College, Adelaide, Incorporation Act describe the College's initial purpose:

Scotch College, Adelaide, is founded for the purpose of providing education for boys of Scotch parentage and descent in South Australia, and such other boys as shall be admitted to the College, and of providing religious instruction for its scholars according to the religious belief of the Presbyterian Church of Australia.

The fundamental principle of the College is that no religious instruction shall be imparted thereat which shall in any way contravene the doctrines of the Presbyterian Church of Australia.

The founding Chairman was Henry Darnley Naylor, an English born, Cambridge-educated classics scholar, described by the Australian Dictionary of Biography as "an uncommonly stimulating teacher... [who] left a lifelong mark on his students, morally and socially as well as intellectually."

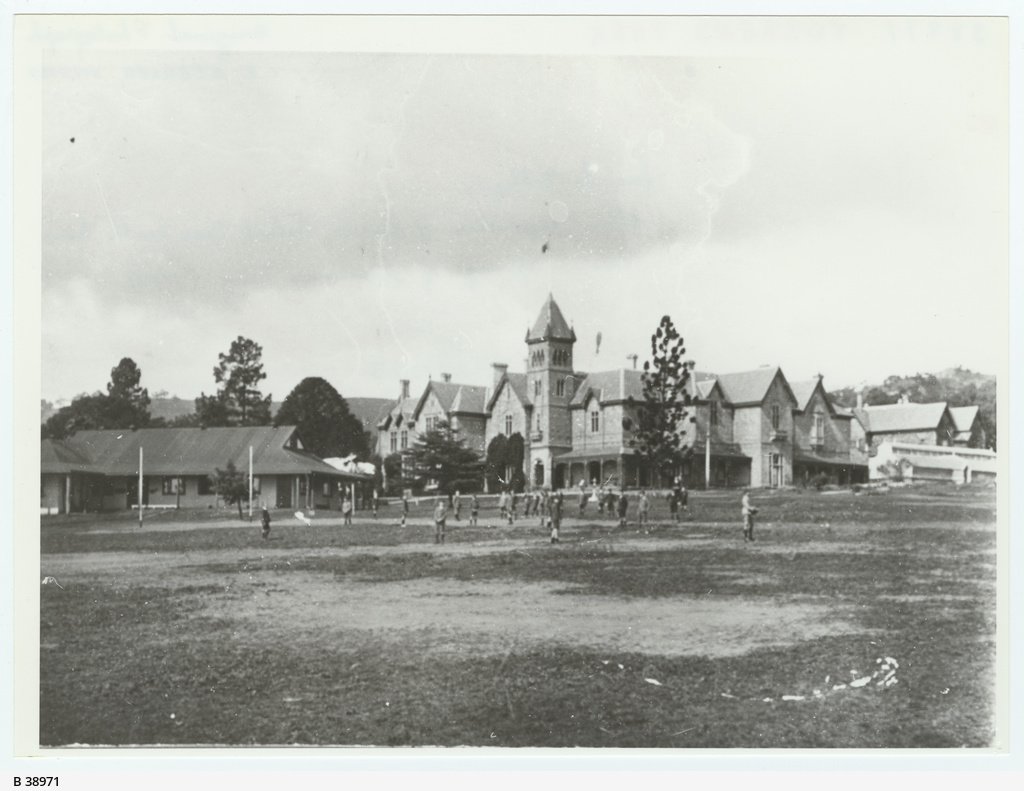
Scotch College, ca. 1920

In 1920, the College moved to the current location of the Middle and Senior School campus in Torrens Park, formerly the property of Sir Robert Richard Torrens, Sir Walter Walton Hughes, and Robert Barr Smith. The new location allowed Scotch to become the first school in South Australia to have a fully operational farm on campus for the purposes of agricultural education.

During World War II, the property was used by the United States Army and then the Royal Australian Air Force as No. 4 Embarkation Depot (4 ED), and the school was forced to move to Birralee, Belair and Brierly Lodge from May 1942 to February 1944. "Gratton House", now the Middle School, was built as a memorial to 57 Old Collegians who were killed in World War II.

Scotch recruited Charles Fisher, who had previously been a master at Harrow School and the son of the Archbishop of Canterbury Geoffrey Fisher, to be its third Headmaster. Fisher has been described as:

a conservative... a manager rather than a thinker. Despite personal optimism, he was pessimistic about encouraging young people to think independently when so many were obviously destined to work in hierarchical institutions. His rather bland desire for his school was that it should balance the development of individuality with the inculcation of attitudes and skills useful to the community, the nation and the world.

Fisher served as headmaster from 1962 to 1969. The Australian Dictionary of Biography described that "he transformed [the school], economically and educationally, by adding a new junior school, science laboratories and a chapel, and by instituting a comprehensive outdoor programme and making strong staff appointments." At the end of 1965 the junior school was instituted as a separate school from the senior College. In 1968, construction of the College Chapel was completed. Previously, students had walked to Hawthorn Presbyterian Church for religious services. The College acquired the lease to Goose Island in 1966, and has incorporated trips there as part of Outdoor Education since. The college further expanded its outdoor and environmental education with the acquisition of its Kyre Campus on Kangaroo Island in 2004, which was included in the curriculum until 2019.

In 1972, the College became co-educational under the reformist Headmaster Philip Roff, and the Middle School was founded the following year. Initially the Middle School consisted of years 7 and 8; in 2002 Year 9 was added to the Middle School. In 1977, the Presbyterian Church of Australia merged with the Methodist and Congregational churches to form the Uniting Church of Australia and Scotch College changed its religious affiliation accordingly. Today, the College is administered by a Council of Governors in connection with the Uniting Church in Australia. The school maintains its church affiliation, but religion plays a significantly diminished role in school life compared to the Presbyterian era, in line with broader social trends and the secularisation of Australian culture since the 1960s.

Margaret Simons, profiling Penny Wong, who attended the school in the first half of the 1980s, described the culture of the school at that time in the following way:

According to Wong, when she was there the school reflected a particularly Adelaide form of liberalism. The deputy principal at that time was Diana Hill, later president of UNICEF Australia and the wife of Robert Hill [who had attended Scotch in the early 1960s] ... Diana Hill had been at the school since 1977, when girls were still a minority. She pushed Scotch to change the uniforms, language and facilities to make the environment more welcoming for girls and female staff, as well as advocating for a shift from a 'blokey' sports-oriented culture to one that valued academic excellence as well.

[Politically] Scotch College, in Wong's experience, was less concerned with privilege and more with 'classic liberalism' or 'Steele Hall liberalism'

In 1993, the College introduced the requirement for all students to use laptop computers, beginning with Year 7. Since 1999, all students have used laptops.

In 1995, Scotch founded a preschool on the Mitcham campus, to be housed in what was formerly the chaplain's residence.

Since at least 2003, Scotch has participated in the Yalari scholarship programme, which offers scholarships to students from indigenous communities to attend the College.

The school's current alma mater was composed in 2007 by Anthony Hubmayer and a group of staff and students. It is set to the tune of the Scottish melody Highland Cathedral.

Scotch College has adopted various "positive education" programs and principles from US psychologist and educator Martin Seligman as part of the school's overall education offering. In 2011, Scotch became the first school in South Australia to formally implement positive psychology programs as part of the school's curriculum. As of 2017, Scotch was a member of the Positive Education Schools Association.

As of 2014, 28% of Middle- and Senior School students participated in rowing. In 2015, both the boys' and girls' First XIII rowing teams won the Head of the River rowing race, the first time in 20 years that the boys had won. The boys had last won in 1995, the girls in 2001.

In September 2019, Scotch announced a $AUD 26M "wellbeing hub" to be completed by 2022.

== Campus ==
Scotch College is situated on two neighbouring campuses, covering over 20 hectares in the Torrens Park area of Mitcham, about 8 kilometres south of Adelaide, in the foothills of the Mount Lofty Ranges. The two campuses of the College are:

- Torrens Park Campus, catering for the Middle School (Years 7 to 9) and the Senior College (Years 10 to 12).
- Junior School Campus catering for students from Reception to Year 6 in connection to an Early Learning Centre for children from three years of age.

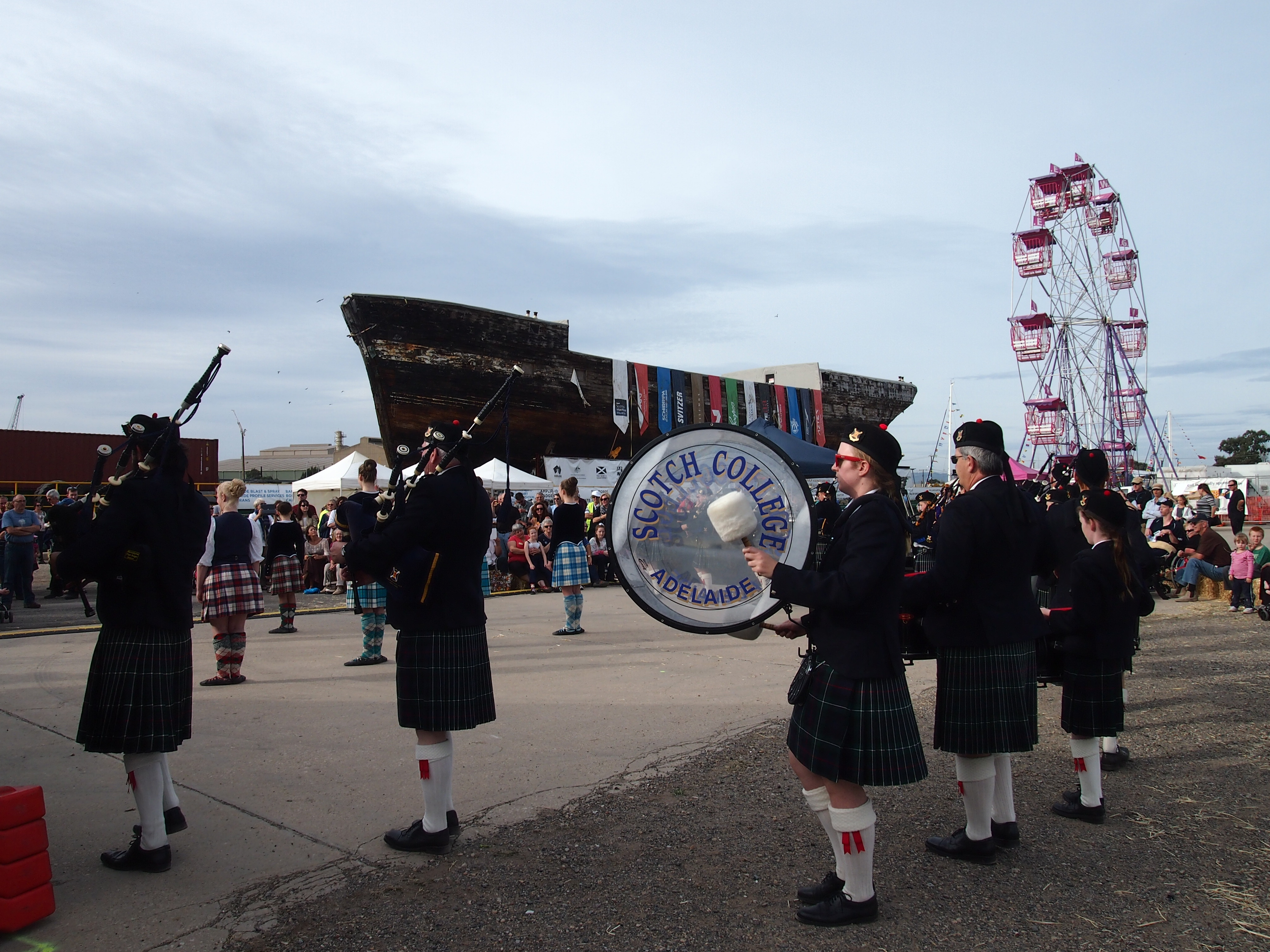
Scotch College pipe band and highland dancers at the City of Adelaide clipper's 150th anniversary at Port Adelaide, 17 May 2014.

The college also owns or leases two island properties used for outdoor and environmental education: Goose Island, since 1966, and Kyre Campus on Kangaroo Island since 2004.

=== Boarding ===
Scotch College has provided boarding facilities for students since the school's establishment in 1919. In 2011, the College opened a new Rosevear Boarding Precinct with individual and shared bedrooms, common rooms with kitchenettes, laundry and storage areas, study spaces, a tutors' suite, and a large outdoor barbecue area. The boarding house currently accommodates more than 100 students each year from Years 7–12, both male and female. It is managed by a Director and Deputy Director of Boarding.

=== Torrens Park House ===
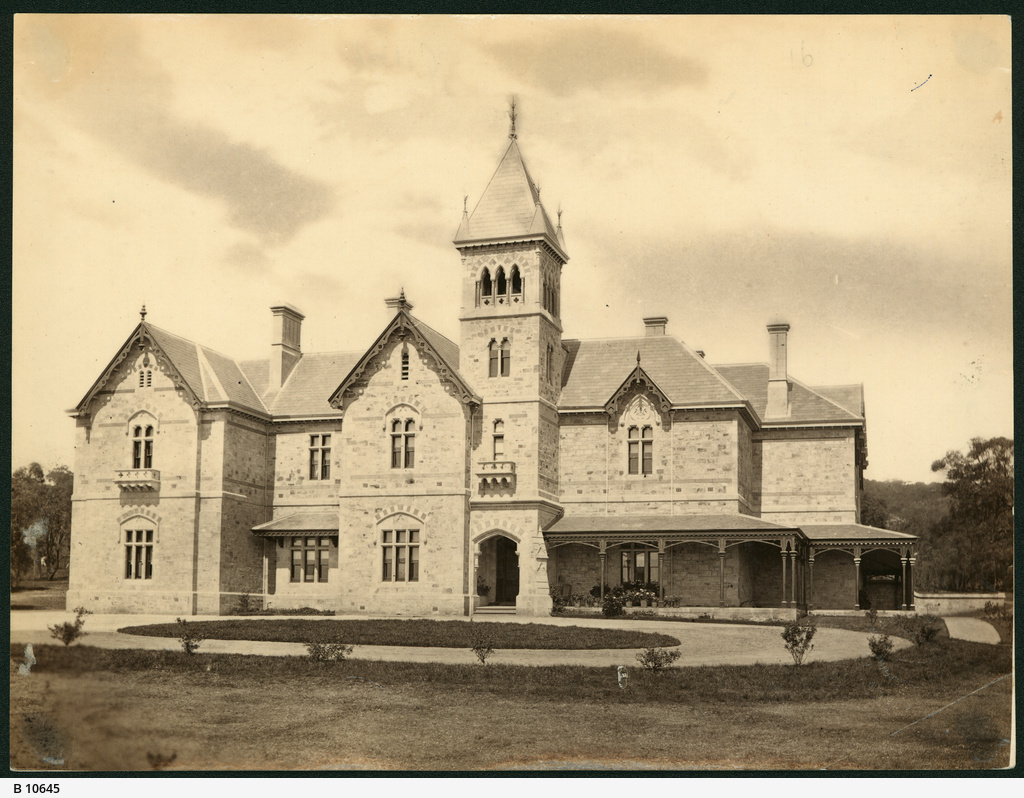
Torrens Park House, circa 1874

The Torrens Park campus (senior and middle schools) surrounds Torrens Park House, a 19th-century mansion that was once the centre of a 134-acre (54 ha) private estate. The house was built in 1853–54 by Sir Robert Torrens, the third Premier of South Australia and known for his world-first introduction of the Torrens title system of land transfer. In 1865, he sold it to his partner in the Moonta Mines and later founder of the University of Adelaide, Sir Walter Watson Hughes, who enlarged it and sold it to Robert Barr Smith in 1874.

The house was owned (although not occupied continuously) by the Barr Smith family until Scotch College moved in. With the architect J. H. Grainger, Robert Barr Smith designed and had built for his family's amusement a complete theatre, with stage, an auditorium 20 metres (66 ft) by 10 metres (33 ft) to accommodate 200 people on William Morris chairs, as well as all of the other necessary trappings of a theatre. The school's theatre is named after the family.

=== Conquest House ===
The Mitcham campus (junior school) is centred on Conquest House, a large building on Norman Walk, by Mitcham Reserve. The house is named after the Conquest family, a family of butchers who lived there and for whom it was built, including Fritz George Conquest and his wife Elsie, née Playford. Their son John Playford Conquest (born 1915) attended Scotch College from 1924 to 1930. The house had also been called "The Willows" and "The Reserve." Conquest is listed as a "Place of Local Heritage Value."

Scotch bought the house in 1963, together with a number of cottages on Albert Street, and formalized the name Conquest House. It originally served as the junior boys' boarding house, but transitioned into an administrative building. The house was restored in 1995.

Conquest House, circa 1910

=== Kallawar ===
Kallawar was the name of a five-acre estate of the Prince family, including George Prince, after whom Princes Road is named, and his son John Prince, founder of the Torrens Arms hotel. The original Kallawar house at the corner of Albert Street and Muggs Hill Road was built in 1849 and consisted of 18 rooms. That original house was damaged by flood in 1897 and an earthquake in 1902. In 1908 it was replaced by the current building for Lloyd Prince.

The property was transferred to Scotch between 1950 and 1963. The ground next to the house was turned into a large sporting field named Montrose Oval. As part of Scotch, Kallawar has served as a boarding house, for which it was renamed Montrose until the end of 1979.

=== Farm ===
The school operates a six-acre (2.5 hectare) farm on the Torrens Park campus for the purpose of agricultural education. Established in 1923 on the property's former stables and horse paddock, the farm was originally focused on an orangery, vineyard, and banana grove. The school was the first in South Australia to offer a dedicated agriculture course. Today there are sheep, alpacas and cattle, as well as winemaking. There is also an aquaculture program focused on freshwater species: Murray cod, Silver Perch, barramundi, Rainbow Trout, and Marron.

== House system ==
Students are divided into houses for the purposes of intramural sport (e.g. sports day and swimming carnival), and in the middle and senior schools, for community and pastoral care. Most houses are named after Scottish clans. The senior and middle school houses are: Cameron, Campbell, Douglas, Gordon, MacGregor, and Stewart. In the junior school the houses are Bruce, Kyre, Lovat, and Montrose. Former houses no longer in existence include Fraser, Anderson, Gratton, Kennedy (as a senior school house) and Argyll. Former middle school houses, phased out in 2007–08, were Buchanan, Forbes, Hamilton, Kennedy, Lamont, Macleod, Napier, and Ross.

== Sport ==
Scotch College is a member of the Sports Association for Adelaide Schools (SAAS), and the Independent Girls Schools Sports Association (IGSSA).

=== IGSSA premierships ===
Scotch College has won the following IGSSA premierships.

- Basketball (7) – 1997, 2000, 2003, 2005, 2009, 2011, 2013
- Football – 2021
- Hockey (2) – 2017, 2018
- Soccer (5) – 2003, 2005, 2007, 2008, 2021
- Softball – 2021

== Headmasters and principals ==
The following people have led Scotch College since its founding:

=== Kyre College ===
- David Henry Hollidge (1902–1915)
- Ben Ellis (1916–1918, acting 1912)

=== Scotch College ===
- Norman Gratton (1919–1951)
- Patrick Disney (1952–1961)
- Charles Fisher (1962–1969)
- Philip Roff (1970–1975)
- Wesley Miles (1975–1991)

The title "Headmaster" was replaced with "Principal", beginning with Kenneth Webb in 1992.

- Kenneth Webb (1992–2000)
- Geoffrey Fisher (2001–2005)
- Cheryl Bauer (acting, 2006)
- Timothy Oughton (2007–2014)
- John Newton (2015–2022)
- Trent Driver (2023– )

Formal portraits of the College's past Principals and Headmasters hang in the atrium of the chapel.

== Chairmen of the College Council ==
The following people served as chair of the college council:

- H. Darnley Naylor (1918–1926)
- J. McKellar Stewart (1926–1952)
- J. A. Prescott (1952–1961)
- D. O. Jordan (1961–1981)
- H. B. Young (1982–1990)
- A. B. Fuller (1991–2001)
- Andrew Saies (2002–2008)
- Ross Haslam (2009–2012)
- Raymond Spencer (2013–2021)
- Todd Roberts (2021–present)

== Notable alumni ==
Alumni and former students of Scotch and Kyre Colleges are referred to as Old Collegians.

=== The Arts ===
- Amy Gebhardt – Award-winning filmmaker
- Tim Jacobs – head of the Victorian Arts Centre and the Sydney Opera House, son of Sam Jacobs
- Tara Morice – Actress
- Sarah Snook – stage, television and film actress
- Ian Mudie – poet
- John Juan, MBE – dancer, radio announcer and compere
- Ben Nicholas – actor
- Antony Hamilton – actor, model, and dancer
- Kerwin Maegraith – cartoonist, illustrator, journalist
- H. A. Lindsay – writer and conservationist
- Carlo Andreacchio – film maker, tech entrepreneur

=== Business ===
- Brian Croser – One of Australia's top winemakers
- Liza Emanuele – prominent fashion designer
- Peter Lehmann – winemaker from the Barossa Valley.
- Kenneth Stirling – accountant, ecologist, and philanthropist
- Robert Donald (Don) Bakewell – Pastoralist
- Toby Bensimon – CEO, Shiels Jewellers
- Mark Ebbinghaus – financier, real estate developer, former global head of real estate banking at Standard Chartered Bank.

=== Journalism ===
- Stewart Cockburn – journalist, commentator and author

=== Medicine ===
- William Fulton Salter (1912–2006) – psychiatrist and mental health reformer
- Claude Stump – embryologist, medical academic

=== Military ===
- Frederick Prentice – World War I ANZAC hero, military medalist, indigenous pioneer

=== Politics ===
- Jack Batty – Liberal member of the South Australian House of Assembly, 2022–present, representing Bragg.
- Penny Wong – ALP Senator for South Australia (2002–)
- Alan Ferguson – Liberal Senator for South Australia (1992–2011)
- Lachlan Clyne – former Mayor, City of Unley
- Legh Davis – Liberal member of the South Australian Legislative Council (1979–2002)
- Graham Gunn – Member (1970–2010) and Speaker (1994–1997) of the South Australian House of Assembly
- Keith Laught – Senator for South Australia (1951–69)
- Robert Hill – Chancellor of the University of Adelaide, Australian Ambassador to the United Nations, Senator for South Australia, Minister for Defence, Leader of the Government in the Australian Senate, and longest serving leader of the Liberal Party in the Senate.
- John McLeay, Jr. – Federal Minister for Construction (1975–1978) and Minister for Administrative Services (1978–1980), member for Boothby (1966–1981)
- Douglas Scott – National Party Senator for New South Wales (1970, 1974–1985), Minister for Special Trade Negotiations (1979–80)
- Alec Fong Lim – Mayor of Darwin, namesake of the Electoral division of Fong Lim
- Gordon Davidson – Liberal Senator for South Australia (1961–1981)
- Herbert Michael – Member of the South Australian House of Assembly, 1939–1941 and 1944–1956. Gallipoli veteran.
- William McAnaney – Liberal member of the South Australian House of Assembly, 1963–1975, representing Stirling and Heysen.

=== Public Service ===
- Sam Jacobs – South Australian Supreme Court Judge who was inquirer into the BankSA collapse
- Peter Barbour – Director-General of ASIO (1970–1975)
- Sir Charles Bright – judge of the Supreme Court of South Australia

=== Science ===
- Howard Florey – Nobel Laureate, co-inventor of Penicillin
- Cyril Nathaniel Kleinig – pilot and airline manager
- Hedley Herbert Finlayson – mammalogist and biologist
- Richard Charles Leslie Bosworth – chemist and academic
- Eldred Norman – inventor and racing-car driver
- Clifford David Boomsma – botanist and forester
- Robert Langdon Crocker – Botanist
- Richard Vynne Woods (1923–2004) – forester, public servant
- Oswald Rishbeth (né Rischbieth) – Geographer, classicist, academic

=== Sport ===
- David Lutterus – Professional golf player, competed on the PGA
- Tom Brice – Professional baseball player (Right-Field), competed in Sydney 2000 Olympics, SASI Graduate
- Juliet Haslam – Dual Olympic gold hockey player, see Hockey at the 2000 Summer Olympics
- Rory Laird – AFL footballer for the Adelaide Crows.
- Ben Nelson – Carlton and Adelaide Crows footballer
- Wayne B. Phillips – Australian Test cricketer
- Victor York Richardson – Australian Test captain, grandfather of Ian, Greg, and Trevor Chappell
- James Seppelt – Silver medalist in the 1994 Rowing World Championship
- Bill Leak – footballer and cricketer
- Thanasi Kokkinakis – professional tennis player
- Meni Haralampopolous – professional soccer player
- Alex Gregory – professional cricketer for the Southern Redbacks
- Rick Drewer – cricketer
- Dick Whitington – professional cricketer and journalist
- Graham Black – cricketer
- Paul Zschorn – cricketer
- Callum Coleman-Jones – AFL footballer for the Richmond Football Club since 2019
- Benjamin Goode – Professional cricketer and medical doctor
- Tom Powell – AFL footballer for the North Melbourne Football Club
- Dylan Holmes – soccer player, formerly with Adelaide United Women and Adelaide City Women, as of 2021 with Swedish club BK Häcken. Graduated 2014.
- Jordan Dawson – captain of the Adelaide Football Club
- James Rose – AFL footballer, Sydney Swans

== See also ==
- List of schools in South Australia
- List of boarding schools
