= 1934 SAAFL season =

1934 premiership season
- Date: 5 May - 22 September
- Premiers: A1: Underdale; A2: Henley & Grange
- Minor premiers: A1: Underdale; A2: Exeter
- Wooden spooners: A1: Alberton Church United; A2: Y.M.C.A.
- Best and fairest: A1 (Hone Medal): Mervyn Evans (Prince Alfred O.C.); A2 (Chambers Medal): Ted Colley (Unley Amateurs), Eric Marriott (Exeter)
- Leading goalkicker: A1: Bill Hann (University) 69 goals A2: Alex Kinlough (Henley & Grange) 112 goals

The 1934 SAAFL season was the 20th season of the South Australian Amateur Football League (SAAFL).

The season commenced on 5 May and concluded on 22 September.

St. Augustine disbanded, Teachers Training College withdrew from difficulties fielding a full team, and Scotch O.C. moved to the Adelaide Students' Association. Flinders Park had been disqualified because of the behaviour of its players and supporters in the 1933 A2 Challenge Final. Two new clubs were: Black Forest (playing at Weigall Oval, Plympton) from the Glenelg District Association, and newly formed Unley Amateurs (using St. Augustine's ground in the south parklands).

Life Memberships were awarded to Professor H. Darnley Naylor (President 1911, 1915–1926) and Dr. F.S. Hone (1927–1933).

Hone retired as president in 1934 and was replaced by J.T. Massey, who had been chairman for the previous four years. L.C. Bridgland, captain of St. Peters O.C. and the state team, was appointed as chairman. However, before the season commenced he was transferred by his employers to a sheep station 350 miles north of Adelaide.

Kensington and Prince Alfred O.C. were promoted to A1, while Semaphore Central were demoted to A2. The A2 competition was reduced from 9 to 7 teams with the exit of 3 teams (disqualified Flinders Park, and withdrawn St. Augustine's, Scotch O.C. and Teachers' Training College), and the entry of 2 new clubs (Black Forest and Unley Amateurs).

Alberton Church United, after having been beaten 0.2 to 24.16 by Underdale in round 10, forfeited its matches for the rest of the season.

== A1 ==
Underdale, Prince Alfred Old Collegians, University, Kensington, Alberton Church United, St. Peter's Old Scholars, Goodwood, and Kenilworth.

=== Ladder ===
Pos	Team	Pld	W	L	D	PF	PA	PP	Pts
1	Underdale United	14	12	2	0	1311	804		24
2	University	14	10	4	0	1190	918		20
3	Kensington	14	9	5	0	1078	866		18
4	Kenilworth	14	9	5	0	1078	886		18
5	St. Peter's O.C.	14	8	6	0	1011	964		16
6	Goodwood	14	4	10	0	745	1016		8
7	Prince Alfred O.C.	14	3	11	0	782	1097		6
8	Alberton Church United	14	1	13	0	502	848		2

=== Semi Finals ===
	Semi-finals
Saturday, 1 September	Underdale 18.11	def.	Kensington 6.12	Prince Alfred College
Saturday, 1 September	University 11.15	def.	Kenilworth 5.9	Unley Oval

=== Final ===
	Final
Saturday, 15 September	Underdale 7.7 (49)	def. by	University 13.4 (94)	Norwood Oval
Umpire: D. Busbridge

=== Challenge Final ===
Sir George Murray Shield
Saturday, 22 September	Underdale	def.	University	Norwood Oval
0.3 (3); 2.7 (19); 9.9 (63); 11.11 (77)	Q1; Q2; Q3; Final	3.4 (22); 3.7 (25); 5.11 (41); 8.11 (59)	Umpires: Field: K.W. Packham; Boundary: D. Busbridge, C. Hepburn
Spain 4, Wilson 2, Molan, Remenant, Conroy, Goodchild	Goals	Kuchel 2, Bentley 2, South, Hann, Sangster, Wright
Molan, Goodchild, Burnett, Miller, Gifford, Jones	Best	McFarlane, White, Kuchel, Thompson, Burnard, Cowan

== A2 ==
Semaphore Central, Black Forest, Unley Amateurs, Adelaide High School Old Scholars, Y.M.C.A., Exeter, and Henley & Grange.

=== Ladder ===
Pos	Team	Pld	W	L	D	PF	PA	PP	Pts
1	Exeter	12	12	0	0	1107	479		24
2	Semaphore Central	12	10	2	0	1234	623		20
3	Henley and Grange	12	8	4	0	1381	860		16
4	Black Forest	12	5	7	0	976	826		10
5	Unley Amateurs	12	4	8	0	877	1128		8
6	Adelaide High O.S.	12	3	9	0	817	1142		6
7	Y.M.C.A	12	0	12	0	390	1724		0

=== Semi Finals ===
	Semi-finals
Saturday, 25 August	Exeter 11.9	def. by	Henley & Grange 16.9	Unley Oval
Saturday, 1 September	Semaphore Central 14.15	def.	Black Forest 9.16	Alberton Oval

=== Final ===
	Final
Saturday, 8 September	Semaphore Central 7.4	def. by	Henley & Grange 10.7	Thebarton Oval	,

=== Challenge Final ===
Mark Mitchell Shield
Saturday, 15 September	Exeter	def. by	Henley & Grange	Unley Oval
2.3; 2.8; 4.9; 10.9 (69)	Q1; Q2; Q3; Final	1.2; 5.5; 7.9; 10.12 (72)	Umpires: C. Hepburn
Cornish 4, Carslow 2, Rowell, Crase, Edwards, Manuel	Goals	Nelson 3, Church 2, Mattie 2, Vawser, Threadgold, Harefield
Philp, Hamilton, Cornish, Carslow, Crase, Anderson, Crase	Best	Kinlough, Warsnop, Oldfield, Wagstaff, Vawser, King, Threadgold, Mattie

== Representative ==
SAAFL
B:	Gifford (Underdale)	J. Flood (St. Peter's O.C.)	Colley (Unley Amateurs)
HB:	Bungey (Adelaide High O.S.)	Burnard (University)	McFarlane (University)
C:	Jens (University) capt.	King (Henley & Grange)	Holder (Goodwood)
HF:	Evans (Prince Alfred O.C.)	Thompson (University)	Kranz (Kensington)
F:	Hannam (Semaphore Central)	Hann (University)	Lee (St. Peter's O.C.) v.c
Foll:	Shaw (Y.M.C.A.)	Melhuish (Kenilworth)	Bell (Black Forest)
Res:	White (University)	F.M. Wilson (Underdale)	A. Kinlough (Henley & Grange)
Coach:	C.C. Daly (University)		

source: sa team: vic team:

Monday, 4 June (2:45 pm)	S.A.A.F.L	v	V.A.F.A.	Norwood Oval (crowd: 1000)
2.3; 3.9; 4.16; 6.20 (56)	Q1; Q2; Q3; Final	3.7; 6.10; 11.12; 11.14 (80)
Lee 2, Hannam 2, Thompson 1, Bell 1	Goals	Law 4, Hodges 3, Steel 2, Campbell, Greening 1
