= Stephen Meek (educator) =

British educator

- Born: November 1952 (age 73); England, United Kingdom
- Occupations: Principal, director
- Spouse: Christine Meek
- Children: Andrew Meek, Henry Meek

Stephen Donald Andrew Meek (born November 1952) is a British educator who has held senior leadership positions at independent schools in the United Kingdom, Australia and Qatar. He is most notable for his role as principal at Geelong Grammar School, which he held from 2004 until 2018.

== Early life and education ==
Meek completed a Master of Arts with First Class Honours in Medieval and Modern History at the University of St Andrews, Scotland. He later undertook a Postgraduate Certificate in Education at the University of Oxford.

== Career ==
Meek began his teaching career at Dulwich College in London, where he taught history. He later served as Head of History and Housemaster of School House at Sherborne School from 1990 to 1995.

In 1995, he was appointed Headmaster of Hurstpierpoint College, West Sussex a position he held until 2004. During his tenure the school became co-educational, having previously being an all-boys school.

=== Tenure at Geelong Grammar School ===
In 2004, Meek was appointed Principal of Geelong Grammar School in Victoria, Australia, a role he held until 2018. During this time, he oversaw the implementation of positive psychology as part of staff training, and the formation of the Geelong Grammar Institute of Positive Education in 2014.

In 2015, Meek appeared before the Royal Commission into Institutional Responses to Child Abuse, where he apologised on behalf of the school and acknowledged that it had failed to adequately protect some students from abuse, that occurred prior to his tenure. He stated that the school's historical responses to abuse were inadequate and expressed regret for the harm suffered by former students.

From 2019 until 2025, he served as Director of Qatar Academy Doha.

== Personal life ==
Meek and his wife Christine have two sons, Andrew and Henry. Henry attended Geelong Grammar School, where he did rowing, finishing in the first crew. He then went on to row for Melbourne University Boat Club, followed by University of Washington Boat Club and then the Cambridge University Boat Club.
