= Gladys Sandford =

Australian-NZ driver & aviator

Gladys Sandford MBE
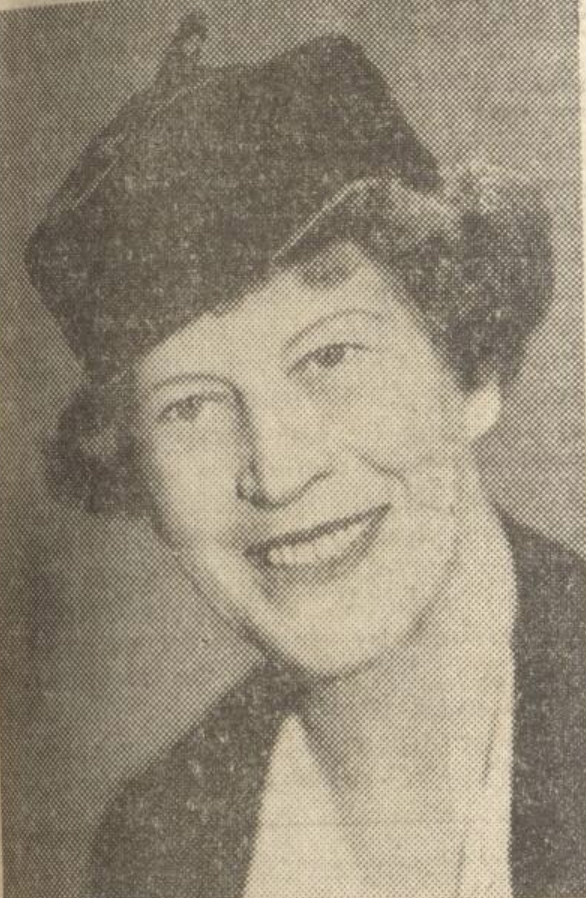
- Born: Gladys Sandford Coates; 4 March 1891; Summer Hill, Sydney, Australia
- Died: 24 October 1971 (aged 80); Concord, New South Wales, Australia
- Known for: first New Zealand woman with pilot's licence

Gladys Sandford MBE (née Coates, 4 March 1891 – 24 October 1971) was an Australian-New Zealand pioneering driver and aviator. She was the first woman in New Zealand to earn a pilot's licence.

== Early life ==
Sandford was born at Summer Hill, Sydney, to Oswald Coates and Valerie Albine, née Lassau. Sandford's father had immigrated from England, and her mother was from South Australia. By 1896 the family had moved to Auckland, New Zealand.

== Adult life ==
Sandford became a school teacher and taught at Napier, in New Zealand's North Island. She married William Henning, a motor salesman, in 1912, and worked with him in their car sales business, learning about cars and engines as she worked.

Sandford had been interested in cars since a young age, preferring to help her brothers work on car engines rather than traditionally feminine interests such as music and sewing. She pursued this interest despite the disapproval of her mother who felt that the activity was inappropriate for women. She learned to drive in record time, and could dismantle then reassemble car engines – a skill that proved useful in her service abroad.

In 1914, World War I broke out, and Henning, and two of Sandford's brothers, enlisted in the New Zealand Expeditionary Force. Sandford tried to enlist as a driver, but was turned down. Instead, she joined the New Zealand Volunteer Sisterhood and travelled to Egypt at her own cost in 1916. She worked as an ambulance driver for a hospital in Giza. During her service in Egypt, some of her friends smuggled her abroad an Air Force plane, which was he first experience of flight. This was "one of the greatest thrills of her life", and contributed to her drive to learn to fly. She later travelled on to England, where she was taken on as an ambulance driver by the N.Z.E.F. in May 1917, and drove for the New Zealand Ambulance Corps in Egypt and France. She was promoted to head lady driver, and after the war finished she stayed on in England to lead the motor transport division at the New Zealand military hospital outside London. She developed influenza, however, and was discharged in January 1919. In 1920 she was appointed M.B.E. for her war services as a driver, recognised for her compassion.

Sandford's husband had died in 1918, and her two brothers had also died, so she returned to Australia alone. In 1920 she married Frederick Esk Sandford, a squadron leader in the Royal Air Force. As he was posted overseas, the couple lived in England, India and Egypt, however in 1924 Sandford moved back to Auckland without him. Sandford went back to her former role in car sales and also taught her customers to drive. She decided to learn to fly, and took lessons with the New Zealand Permanent Air Force, as the Royal New Zealand Air Force was then called, in Christchurch. In December 1925 she became the first woman in New Zealand to gain a pilot's licence at Wigram, Christchurch on 22 December 1925.

From March to July 1927 she and a (non-driving) companion, Stella Christie, completed a 10,000 mile (16,093 km) car journey from Sydney to Perth, Darwin, Adelaide and back to Sydney, in a 1926 Essex 6 coach. The route had been planned to copy Francis Birtles' trip from Adelaide to Darwin, however floods and road conditions meant the itinerary had to be adapted as they travelled. The pair also crossed paths with fellow motoristes Jean Beatson and Kathleen Gardiner (also touring Australia by car that year), and together they disrupted the Overland Telegraph Line to bring assistance.

In December 1928, in Sydney, she divorced, Frederick Esk Sandford, only days before he died after a car accident near Glenrowan, Victoria.

In 1929 Sandford settled in Sydney. During World War II she worked as a censor for the Army; she also founded the Women's Transport Corps, a group of almost 400 members who underwent training in driving and car maintenance. After the war finished, Sandford ran a poultry farm before taking a job with the Department of Repatriation. In 1956 she retired and moved into the War Veterans' Home in Narrabeen. She became a vice-president of the Sydney branch of the New Zealand Returned Soldiers' Association, and visited sick and distressed soldiers and their families. She died on 24 October 1971 at the Repatriation General Hospital, Concord.

In 2016, war historian Glyn Harper and illustrator Jenny Cooper published a children's book about Sandford's life, entitled Gladys Goes to War.
