= Stacey Mendonca =

New Zealand women in construction advocate

Stacey Mendonca MNZM
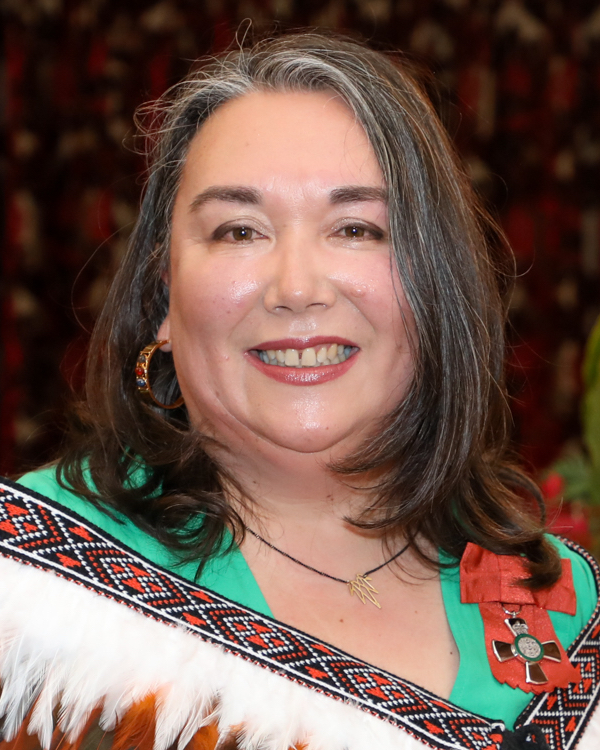
- Awards: Member of the New Zealand Order of Merit

Stacey Victoria Mendonca MNZM is a New Zealand quantity surveyor and estimator. Mendonca co-founded the New Zealand chapter of the National Association of Women in Construction in 1996. In 2023 Mendonca was appointed a Member of the New Zealand Order of Merit for services to women.

== Career ==
Mendonca is a quantity surveyor and estimator at Newcrest Construction. She has previously worked for Fletcher Construction.

Mendonca was one of three founders of the New Zealand chapter of the National Association of Women in Construction (NAWIC), which provides support to women in the construction sector. They established NAWIC in 1996 as a single branch in Wellington, and expanded it to eight branches with more than 1600 members. Mendonca was the inaugural president of the organisation, and took up the role again in 2019. After stepping down as president in 2021, she continues to run the annual NAWIC Annual Excellence Awards. Mendonca also established a mentoring programme for women called Connecting-in-Construction, to combat isolation, and ran webinars during the COVID-19 lockdowns.

== Honours and awards ==
In 2001 Mendonca was awarded the NAWIC Lifetime Award. In the 2023 King's Birthday and Coronation Honours Mendonca was appointed a Member of the New Zealand Order of Merit for services to women. Mendonca was awarded the 2023 Diversity Champion Award by Diversity Works NZ, a national organisation promoting workplace diversity, equity and inclusion.

== Personal life ==
Mendonca is married to Mike Mendonca, who was chief resilience officer and acting chief infrastructure officer at Wellington City Council until his resignation in 2021.
