= Aristomenis (disambiguation) =

Aristomenis a greek village. It may also refer to:

== People ==
- Aristomenis Tsirbas
- Aristomenis Kontogouris
- Aristomenis Charalampopoulos
