= Charalampopoulos =

Charalampopoulos is a surname. Notable people with the surname include:

- Aristomenis Charalampopoulos, Greek-Australian footballer
- Ioannis Charalampopoulos, Greek Army officer and politician
- Vassilis Charalampopoulos (actor), Greek actor
- Vassilis Charalampopoulos (basketball) (born 1997), Greek basketball player
