= Jean Beatson =

Australian motorist, mechanic and photographer

Jean Ochiltree Beatson (née Robertson; 1904–1981) was an Australian motorist, mechanic and photographer best known for her motor tours of Australia in the 1920s and 1930s with her school friend, Kathleen Gardiner.

== Early and personal life ==
Jean Beatson was born in 1904 to a wealthy western district pastoral family in Goroke, Victoria. Her parents were Francis Robert Gordon Robertson and Emma Ochiltree.

Beatson attended the Clyde School in Melbourne. It was here that she met her best friend and future motoring partner, Kathleen Gardiner.

After finishing school, she obtained a motor maintenance qualification at Alice Anderson's Motor Service – Australia's first female-run motor garage workshop. By 1927, she and Kathleen were well known in the motoring community, having gained prizes in the Royal Automobile Club of Victoria 24-hour reliability trials.

In 1932 she married Robert Beatson, the representative of Riley in Australia and New Zealand, who she met on one of her motoring adventures.

== Motor tours ==
Beatson had a keen interest in motoring and, with Kathleen, took several extensive road trips around Australia and the world. Her father was also supportive of Beatson's desire to become a motoriste (or lady motorist) and gifted her a Lancia Lambda sports car for the trips.

Beatson and Gardiner's main motor tours were from Melbourne to Darwin (1927), Melbourne to Perth (1928), and Melbourne to England (1931–1932).

The Melbourne to Darwin trip was supported by Shell and the women mapped the route for Shell in exchange for petrol. It was the first time large areas of central Australia were mapped. The women drove through Mount Gambier, Adelaide, the Central Desert to Oodnadatta and Alice Springs, and on to Darwin, often following telegraph wires along the Overland Telegraph Line (as there were no proper roads). They also encountered fellow motoriste Gladys Sandford and her companion, and worked with them to disrupt the telegraph line to bring assistance. Beatson extensively documented this trip through photography, and her collection is available at the State Library Victoria.

During the Melbourne to Perth trip, Beatson and Gardiner tried to break the land speed record, but were unsuccessful, as they became bogged in South Australia and later in Victoria. They did however break the Perth to Adelaide record by 5 hours and 12 minutes, racing the transcontinental express train across Nullarbor Plain and completing the trip in 2 days and 10 hours.

In 1931, Beatson and Gardiner were chosen to represent Australia in the Monte Carlo Rally, alongside team members Robert Beatson (team organiser), Mrs Charles Coldham (the chaperone), Miss Joan Richmond, and Mr J. P. Morice (journalist). Beatson was one of the drivers and the team drove up the east coast to Darwin, took a boat to Asia and drove through Singapore, India, the Middle East and Egypt, and took another boat to Palermo. They competed in Riley Nine cars. Beatson placed 19th in the Rally, and also placed 4th in the Ladies Cup with Kathleen.

After the Rally, Beatson drove on to the UK with Kathleen. Here, the pair also participated in recreational flying as they both had a pilot's license.

== Later life ==
After her motor tours, Beatson went on to compete in sheepdog trials and was also a plane spotter for the Australian Volunteer Air Observers Corps during World War II, when she fell ill. In 1955 she won the National Maiden Championship for dog trials at Manuka Oval with her home bred dog Firrhill Bob.

Jean Beatson died on 28 September in 1981 in Undera, Victoria. She is buried in the Springvale Botanical Cemetery.
