= Helen Tippett =

Australian and New Zealand architect and architectural academic

Helen Tippett OBE
- Born: Helen Margaret O'Donnell; 23 March 1933; Warragul, Victoria, Australia
- Died: 11 February 2004 (aged 70); Wellington, New Zealand
- Occupations: Architect; academic

Helen Margaret Tippett OBE (née O'Donnell; 23 March 1933 – 11 February 2004) was an architecture academic in Australia and New Zealand. She was the first professor of architecture in Australasia, and the first woman to be a dean at Victoria University of Wellington. In 1989, she became the first woman to serve as president of the New Zealand Institute of Architects.

== Early life, family and education ==
Tippet was born Helen Margaret O'Donnell in Warragul, Victoria, Australia, on 23 March 1933. She was educated at Geelong Church of England Girls' Grammar School, The Hermitage, and went on to study architecture at the University of Melbourne in the early 1950s, where her peers' description of her work at this time reveals "a determination to solve problems of careful planning analysis and building production as part of the design process". She graduated with a Bachelor of Architecture (Honours) in 1954, and later completed a Master of Business Administration degree at Melbourne in 1974.

She became engaged to George Henry King Tippett, a physician, in 1953. The couple married and they lived in Alice Springs for several years where George was a medical officer in charge of the Royal Flying Doctor Service, and then in London and Beirut where George pursued a career as an anaesthesiologist. The couple had three children, and later divorced.

== Career ==
After graduating from university, Tippett worked in the studio of Robin Boyd. After marriage, she began a mobile practice in northern and central Australia, as well as in Sydney and Melbourne. During her family's three years in Beirut, she worked on projects in the Middle East, dressing as a man when she visited building sites.

Tippett's career in academia began in Melbourne in 1969, where she taught the course 'Design and Practice and Management'. In 1979, she moved to Victoria University of Wellington in New Zealand, where she was dean of Architecture at Victoria University of Wellington from 1980 to 1983 during the architecture school's early years, helping to set its tone alongside the first dean, Gerd Block. In this position she was the first woman professor of architecture in Australasia, and Victoria's first woman dean. She later returned to professional practice, co-founding The Architects Collaborative in Wellington.

In 1989, Tippett became the first woman to be elected president of the New Zealand Institute of Architects. She was also influential in the New Zealand building industry, and her work resulted in New Zealand's first official building code, and the Building Act 1991. She helped to establish the National Association of Women in Construction (New Zealand).

== Honours and awards ==
Tippett received the New Zealand Institute of Building medal in 1989, and was awarded a leadership award by the Master Builders Federation in 1990. She was appointed an Officer of the Order of the British Empire, for services to architecture, in the 1994 Queen's Birthday Honours.

== Death and legacy ==
Tippett died in Wellington on 11 February 2004. The same year, an archive of material collected and produced by Tippett was transferred to Victoria University of Wellington.

The National Association of Women in Construction (New Zealand) gives an annual award in her name, to a person or organisation who has "furthered the interests of women in the construction industry".
