= David Howard Maude-Roxby-Montalto di Fragnito =

British artist craftsman

David Montalto
- Born: David Howard Maude-Roxby-Montalto di Fragnito; 30 August 1934; Curry Rivel, Somerset, England
- Education: Sorbonne University; Accademia di Belle Arti di Firenze
- Notable work: Warhal/Warhal (2008-2009); The Sultan of Brunei(1994); The Old Cello Player (1983)
- Spouse: Patricia Gail Montalto (née Lyons)
- Website: www.davidmontalto.com

David Howard Maude-Roxby-Montalto di Fragnito (born 30 August 1934), also known as David Montalto, 14th Duke of Fragnito is a Swiss-based British artist craftsman, specializing in glass engraving (using diamond-point stipple engraving), glass sculpture, painting and jewellery. Montalto has exhibited extensively in Britain, Europe and the United States, including regular exhibitions in London, Geneva and Paris. Some of his works are on permanent show at the Victoria and Albert Museum in London, Philadelphia History Museum at the Atwater Kent in Philadelphia, the Corning Museum of Glass in New York, as well as royal and international private collections in Great Britain, Brunei, Oman and more.

== Biography ==
David was born in Curry Rivel, Somerset, England, to Howard James Trevelyan (1883 - 1971) and Joyce Maud Maude-Roxby (1899 - 1992). He was the fourth of five children. In 1966, he was adopted by his Italian cousins, Francesco Luigi Antonio Montalto, Duke of Fragnito (1899 - 1979) and Anna Maria Gabriella Giulia Cecilia Fioravanti (1909 - 1982) after they lost their son, Ruggiero Montalto di Fragnito Principe di Lequile who died in an accident in 1966. With the adoption, David M-R inherited his adopted parents' surname, Montalto di Fragnito, and their hereditary Italian noble titles (including upon the death of his adopted father), The Duke of Fragnito, Prince of Lequile). As his natural parents were still alive, he also kept their surname, Maude-Roxby.

In 1947, David travelled with his tutor (and one of his brothers) to Victoria, Australia to write and illustrate a book on the wildlife of the Great Barrier Reef. In Australia, he attended Geelong Grammar School, where he studied under Ludwig Hirschfeld Mack, a member of The Bauhaus movement. He returned to England, to attend Claysmore School in Dorset. After graduation, he went on to study at Sorbonne University and then the Accademia di Belle Arti in Florence Italy, studying under Primo Conti and Goffredo Trovarelli.

Montalto remained in Italy after his adoption and was offered a partnership with Giancarlo 'Jinx' Girard at Tunsi Ceramics. Some of their works have been acquired by The Museum of Childhood in Santa Fe, New Mexico, USA. Inspired by the works of Lawrence Whistler and other masters of diamond point stipple glass engraving, Montalto developed his own techniques. In 1973, to celebrate Great Britain joining the European Economic Community, David was commissioned to design and engrave series commemorative glasses which were presented to every Head of State. He has worked for the jewellers Harry Winston, designing and making an ornamental gold pendent to hold a 50 Carat Ruby. David has also designed a pen with a solid Baccarat Crystal box for Montegrappa, the luxury pen company. In 2008 David collaborated with the master watch maker Michel Parmigiani to create for Parmigiani Fleurier a uniquely engraved wrist watch.

David Montalto has lectured at The Harvard Club of Boston, The Royal College of Physicians, Sotheby's, Christie's Fine Art Courses and The Friends of Zion Museum.

== Personal life ==
David Montalto is married to Patricia Gail (née Lyons). They have two children Daniel James Francesco, Pincipe di Lequile (1974-2020) and Alexandra Rachel Jane (1976). David Montalto works and lives between his studios in Switzerland, Italy and England.

== Selective works ==
=== Sculpture ===
- Sir Robert Mayer Commemorative Trophy, 1978 London Philharmonic Orchestra
- Nadia Nerina -The Dragonfly, 1982, Private collection, United Kingdom
- Into The Straight, 1989
- Sir Anthony Dowell as Des Grieux, 1990 Private collection, United Kingdom
- The Sultan of Oman, 1992 The Royal Palace Private Collection, Oman
- The Sultan of Brunei, 1994 The Royal Palace Private Collection, Brunei
- The Wings of Aspiration, 2000 The Corning Museum of Glass
- The peace pen crystal case, 2001 The Peace Parks Foundation Collection
- Beethoven-Warhol, 2007-2008 Private Collection, USA
- Warhol-Warhol, 2008-2009 Private Collection, USA

=== Jewellery ===
- 1978 Harry Winston 49.03 carat Indian ruby pendent and necklace with engraved case, Private collection Japan
- 2008 Parmigiani Fleurier Watch, Private collection

=== Calligraphy ===
- Lord Menuhin portrait, 1970 - Menuhin Family Collection, Switzerland,
- Harmony – the Cellist, 1983- Part of the permanent collection of the Victoria and Albert Museum, London
- Napoleon Bonaparte portrait, 2002- Private collection, Wrexham, United Kingdom
- Baron Axel von dem Bussche-Streithorst, 1987
- Prince of Wales Crest, 1983- Created for the Royal College of Music Centenary
