= Samuel McCaughey (cricketer) =

Australian cricketer and pastoralist

Personal information
- Full name: Samuel McCaughey
- Born: 27 November 1892; Jerilderie, New South Wales, Australia
- Died: 29 January 1955 (aged 62); Manly, New South Wales, Australia
- Batting: Unknown
- Bowling: Right-arm medium Leg break

Domestic team information
- Years: Team
- 1913: Cambridge University

Career statistics
Competition	First-class
Matches	2
Runs scored	10
Batting average	3.33
100s/50s	–/–
Top score	9
Balls bowled	247
Wickets	9
Bowling average	13.66
5 wickets in innings	1
10 wickets in match	–
Best bowling	7/46
Catches/stumpings	3/–
- Source: Cricinfo, 2 May 2021

Samuel McCaughey (27 November 1892 – 29 January 1955) was an Australian first-class cricketer and pastoralist.

The son of David McCaughey, a grazier from Ireland, he was born at Coree Station near Jerilderie in New South Wales in November 1892. He was educated at Geelong Grammar School, before travelling to England to study at Jesus College, Cambridge. While studying at Cambridge, he played two first-class cricket matches for Cambridge University Cricket Club in 1913 at Fenner's, against Middlesex and Sussex, taking figures of 7 for 46 against Middlesex.

After graduating from Cambridge, he returned to Coree. However, with the start of the First World War in Europe, McCaughey returned to England to serve in the British Army. He was commissioned as a second lieutenant in the Royal Field Artillery in September 1915. He served on the Western Front with the 46th Battery, 1st Divisional Artillery and was promoted to lieutenant in July 1917. He married the Australian Eleanor Una McKellar in February 1917 at the Scottish National Church in London.

McCaughey relinquished his commission in the Royal Field Artillery in April 1920 and returned to Australia. There he bought the remaining 65,000 acres of Coree station from his uncle, Samuel McCaughey. His marriage to Una ended in divorce, with the couple having had four daughters and a son; as part of his divorce settlement he purchased for her the Tongala estate. He formed the Coree Pastoral Co. in 1938, with the company becoming well-noted for producing high quality rams and merino clip. His son and nephew both died in the Second World War, with McCaughey and his brother, Roy, both donating 24,000 acres of their Coree estate in their memory to the Australian nation for pastoral research and training. McCaughey later died at Manly from leukemia in January 1955.
