= Benjamin Goode =

Australian cricketer

Personal information
- Full name: Benjamin Ryall Goode
- Born: 23 January 1924; Port Lincoln, South Australia
- Died: 3 February 2014 (aged 90)
- Batting: Right-handed

Domestic team information
- Years: Team
- 1945–46 to 1949–50: South Australia

Career statistics
Competition	First-class
Matches	3
Runs scored	131
Batting average	26.20
100s/50s	0/1
Top score	72 *
Catches/stumpings	2/–
- Source: Cricinfo, 6 August 2020

Benjamin Ryall Goode (23 January 1924 – 3 February 2014) was an Australian cricketer and general practitioner. He played in three first-class matches for South Australia between 1946 and 1949.

Goode attended Scotch College, Adelaide, from 1931 to 1941. In 1941 he was School Captain, dux of the school and captain of cricket, football and tennis. He studied medicine at the University of Adelaide and graduated MBBS in 1949, going to join his father and older brother in practice in Adelaide. He worked as a general practitioner until he retired in 1991. He married Jean Phillipps, a physiotherapist at the Adelaide Children's Hospital, in March 1948. He died in February 2014, aged 90.

In his first match for South Australia, in March 1946, Goode batted at number six and top-scored with 72 not out in South Australia's first-innings total of 211 in reply to Victoria's 697. However, he played only two more first-class matches, four seasons later.
