= Melanie Guile =

Australian writer (born 1949)

- Born: 1949 (age 76–77); England
- Education: University of Melbourne
- Occupation: Writer
- Website: www.melanieguile.com

Melanie Guile is an Australian writer for children and adults. She was born in the north of England in 1949 and emigrated to Australia at the age of five.

== Biography ==
Guile was educated at Methodist Ladies’ College and at Melbourne University, where she graduated with a Bachelor of Arts degree, a Master of Arts and a Diploma in Education. She worked for several years as a lecturer in children's literature at Melbourne University's School of Early Childhood, and published many reviews and articles on children's books.

Guile knew she wanted to be a writer from the age of seven, but only began her first novel for children after the birth of her second child. In 1996, her junior fiction title, Revenge of the Green Genie, was published by Scholastic Australia, followed by Mr Venus, Computer Wizard in 1997. Since then, Guile has published a wide range of fiction and non-fiction titles for both children and adults. She currently works as a full-time writer in Melbourne.

== Selected works ==
- Revenge of the Green Genie (1996)
- Children in Australian History series (2005)
- Culture in Vietnam (2005)
- Gold in Australia series (2006)
- Clyde School - An Uncommon History (2006)
- Ghost Granny (2007)
- Stories from Australia’s History series (2010)
