= Paul Zschorn =

Australian cricketer

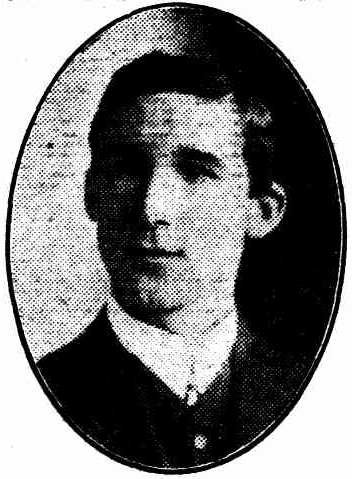

Personal information
- Full name: Paul William Zschorn
- Born: 16 July 1886; North Unley, South Australia
- Died: 13 June 1953 (aged 66); Glen Iris, Melbourne, Victoria
- Batting: Right-handed

Domestic team information
- Years: Team
- 1910/11: South Australia
- Source: ESPNcricinfo, 7 December 2015

Paul William Zschorn (16 July 1886 – 13 June 1953) was an Australian first-class cricketer.

A right handed batsman, Zschorn played two matches for South Australia in the 1910/1911 Australian season, scoring 13 runs. He was a batsman for Sturt in district cricket.
