= First team =

First team may refer to:

== Sports ==
- First team (association football), the colloquial name given to the most senior team fielded by a football club
- The First Team, the first players known to have played the sport of basketball
- First Team All-American, a hypothetical American sports team composed of outstanding amateur players
- The first-choice lineup of players in a sports team who start the game

== Arts and entertainment ==
- The First Team (novel), a novel by John Ball
- The First Team (TV series), a British comedy television series
- First Team: Juventus, a 2018 American and Italian documentary

== Military ==
- US 1st Cavalry Division, whose nickname and motto bears 'first team'

== Business ==
- The business book The Five Dysfunctions of a Team promotes the concept of a first team
