= Kathleen Gardiner =

Australian motorist (1903–2001)

Kathleen Elizabeth Gardiner (née Howell; 1903–2001) was an Australian motorist best known for her twentieth-century motor tours of Australia with her school friend, Jean Beatson.

== Early and personal life ==
Kathleen Gardiner was born on 13 December 1903 in Richmond, Victoria to Elizabeth Mary Irwin and Frederick Thomas Howell. She attended the Clyde School in Melbourne, where she met her best friend and future motoring partner, Jean Beatson.

In January 1938, she married Dr Cecil Alexander Gardiner.

== Motor tours ==
Gardiner was a keen motorist and, with Beatson, took several road trips around Australia and the world during her lifetime. Their main motor tours were from Melbourne to Darwin (1927), Melbourne to Perth (1928), and Melbourne to the UK (1931–1932).

The Melbourne to Darwin trip was supported by the Shell Oil Company and the women mapped the route for Shell in exchange for petrol. It was the first time large areas of central Australia were mapped. Gardiner and Beatson drove through Mount Gambier, Adelaide, the Central Desert to Oodnadatta and Alice Springs, and on to Darwin, often following the telegraph line and staying at repeater stations overnight.

During the Melbourne to Perth trip, Beatson and Gardiner broke the Perth to Adelaide record by 5 hours and 12 minutes, racing the transcontinental express train across the Nullarbor and completing the trip in 2 days, 9 hours and 57 minutes.

In 1932, Gardiner and Beatson represented Australia in the Monte Carlo Rally in Riley Nine cars. They drove up the east coast Darwin, took a boat to Asia and drove to Egypt via Singapore, India, and the Middle East, and then took another boat to Palermo.

Gardiner and her friend Beatson also had pilot's licenses and so, after the Rally, they drove on to the UK to participate in recreational flying.

See Jean Beatson’s page for more information about these trips.

== Later life ==
Kathleen Gardiner died on 16 November 2001 in Toora, Victoria.
