= Jeff Brisbane =

Australian rules footballer

Personal information
- Full name: Jeffrey Peter Brisbane
- Born: 22 October 1924; St Kilda, Victoria
- Died: 17 January 2002 (aged 77)
- Original team: Navy / Geelong Grammar
- Height: 178 cm (5 ft 10 in)
- Weight: 84 kg (185 lb)

Playing career^{1}
Years	Club	Games (Goals)
1944, 1947	Geelong	4 (2)
- ^{1} Playing statistics correct to the end of 1947.

Jeffrey Peter Brisbane (22 October 1924 – 17 January 2002) was an Australian rules footballer who played with Geelong in the Victorian Football League (VFL).

== Personal life ==
Brisbane served as a sub-lieutenant in the Royal Australian Navy during the Second World War.
