= Jeremy David Pickett-Heaps =

Australian biologist (1940–2021)

Jeremy David Pickett-Heaps FRS (5 June 1940 — 11 April 2021) was a biologist who used different forms of microscopy to investigate the inner-workings and dynamics of cells.

Jeremy grew up in India and Australia, but attended the University of Cambridge for his undergraduate studies from 1959. This was followed by a PhD with the Biochemistry department investigating cell organelles in wheat, where his interest in electron microscopy begun.

After his PhD he returned to Australia, to Australian National University's John Curtin School of Medicine, where his interest in green algae cells began. After five years he moved to the University of Colorado, Boulder, invited by the cell electron microscopy pioneer Keith Porter. There he would remain for 18 years, further studying green algae, as well as diatoms, and expanding in to time-lapse recordings.

In 1988, he returned to Australia, joining the University of Melbourne as head of the School of Botany, a position he held until 2002. He cooperated with British microscopist Brian J Ford during the following years. His later research years also focused on animal cell mitosis.

Jeremy's expertise in recording the microscopic behaviour of cells—microcinematography—also led to a commercial enterprise.

He was elected Fellow of the Australian Academy of Science in 1992, and The Royal Society in 1995.
