= Ian Toyne =

Australian rules footballer

Personal information
- Full name: Ian Toyne
- Born: 9 February 1930
- Died: 2 March 1999 (aged 69)
- Original team: Geelong Grammar School
- Height: 175 cm (5 ft 9 in)
- Weight: 72 kg (159 lb)

Playing career^{1}
Years	Club	Games (Goals)
1948–50	Geelong	38 (0)
1952	Melbourne	1 (0)
Total		39 (0)
- ^{1} Playing statistics correct to the end of 1952.

Ian Toyne (9 February 1930 – 2 March 1999) was an Australian rules footballer who played with Geelong and Melbourne in the Victorian Football League (VFL).
