= Darnley Naylor =

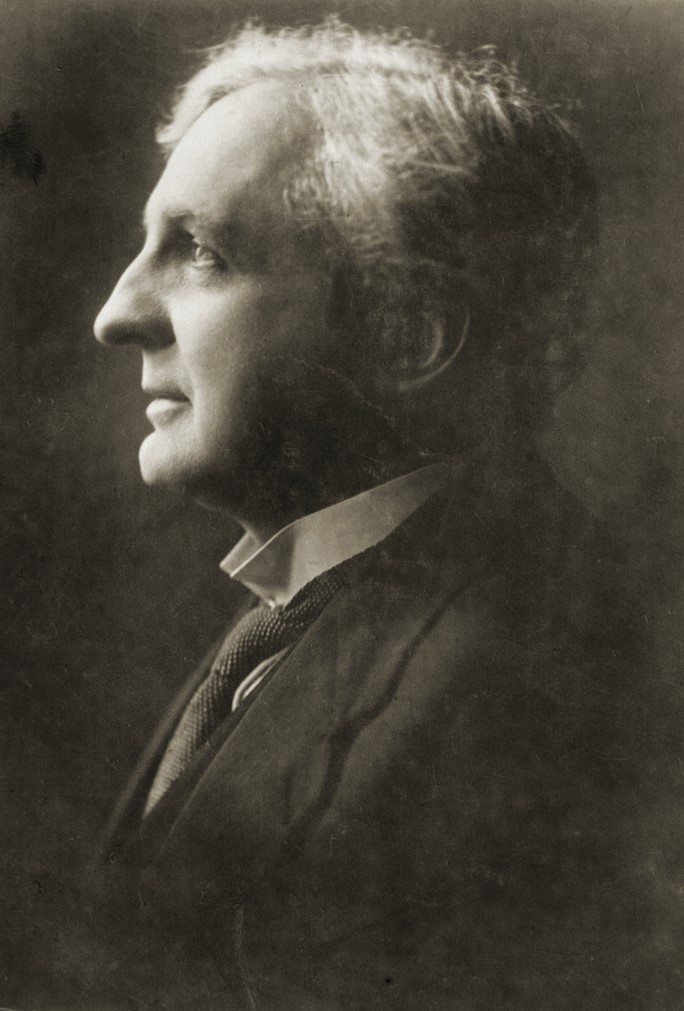

Henry Darnley Naylor (21 February 1872 – 8 December 1945), generally known as Darnley Naylor, was a British-born Australian academic who became emeritus Professor of Classics in the University of Adelaide, South Australia. He was also briefly a British Liberal Party politician.

== Background ==
Naylor was born in Scarborough, North Yorkshire, the son of John Naylor, the composer and organist of York Minster and Mary Anne Chatwin. He was educated at St Peter's School, York and Trinity College, Cambridge where in 1894 he obtained a First Class in Classical Tripos and the Walker Prize in Classics. He emigrated to Australia in the 1890s. In 1898, he married Jessie Cairns Lloyd of Melbourne. They had one daughter. Jessie died in 1913. In 1916, he married Ethel Richman Wilson of Adelaide. They had one son.

== Professional career ==
Naylor was a Lecturer and tutor at Ormond College, University of Melbourne, from 1895 to 1906. He was Vice-Master of Ormond, from 1903 to 1906. He was Professor of Classics in the University of Adelaide, South Australia, from 1906 to 1927. He was a member of the Adelaide University Council and was a member of the Council of St Mark's College. He was Governor of the Public Library of South Australia. He was Chairman of the Scotch College, Adelaide. He was associated with the South Australian Literary Societies' Union and was its president in 1909. In 1913 he was appointed vice-president of the British Classical Association.

== Political career ==
Naylor was an associate of the classical scholar Gilbert Murray who was a leading Liberal Party intellectual. They shared a particular interest in internationalism and were both active in the League of Nations Union. In 1927, Naylor decided to return to Britain and settled in Cumberland. In 1926 he had been selected as Liberal prospective candidate for the Whitehaven division of Cumberland. It was a Unionist/Labour marginal offering little hope of success for a Liberal. He contested the 1929 General Election and finished a poor third. He did not stand for parliament again. He was elected a Governor of Keswick School. He remained in Cumberland, and died in Cockermouth in 1945.

== Publications ==
- Latin and English Idiom (1909)
- Short Parallel Syntax (1910)
- More Latin and English Idiom(1915)
- Horace, Odes and Epodes: A Study in Poetic Word Order (1921)
- 365 Short Quotations from Horace with Varied Metrical Versions (1935)

Naylor was a frequent contributor to the Classical Review and Classical Quarterly. He also contributed to the Encyclopædia Britannica of 1929.
