= National Association of Women in Construction =

- Formation: 1953
- Type: Professional association
- Headquarters: Fort Worth, Texas
- Location: United States
- Members: 4,500 nationwide
- Official language: English
- Website: www.nawic.org

The National Association of Women in Construction (NAWIC) is a professional association for women in the field of construction. The purpose of the association is to support women in construction through networking, professional education, and mentorship. Its professional staff is based in Fort Worth, Texas.

== History ==
The association began as Women in Construction of Fort Worth, Texas in 1953. It was founded by Alice Ashley, Ida Mae Bagby, Carolyn Balcomb, Sue Bowling, Margaret Bubar, Margaret Cleveland, Era Dunn, Doris Efird, Ronda Farrell, Hazel Floyd, Jimmie Blazier, Nina Ruth Jenkins, Ethel McKinney, Irene Moates, Mildred Tarter and Edna Mae Tucker to provide support for area women working in the male-dominated field. Recognizing the need for networking and support for women working in the industry beyond Fort Worth, the group amended its charter to incorporate chapters nationwide. In May 1955, Women in Construction of Fort Worth, Texas received its national charter to officially become The National Association of Women in Construction.

== Membership ==
Members represent all aspects of the construction industry including trades, project management, administrative, legal, financial, and insurance fields. Active membership is available to women only, who spend at least 20 hours per week working on construction-related activities and belong to a chapter. Women who do not qualify for active membership may join the association as a nonvoting member.

== Organization ==
NAWIC has more than 115 chapters in 47 U.S. states. Chapters are organized into eight regions. NAWIC is governed by a board of directors consisting of the executive committee (president, president-elect, vice president, secretary, treasurer, immediate past president, parliamentarian, and executive director) as well as regional directors.

NAWIC is affiliated with similar associations in other countries, including the Canadian Association of Women in Construction, NAWIC Australia, NAWIC New Zealand, NAWIC Qatar, South African Women in Construction, and NAWIC UK.

== Education ==
In 1963, the NAWIC Founders Scholarship Foundation was formed to provide financial support to students pursuing construction-related training. NFSF is a self-supporting scholarship program and a 509(a)(3) designated organization that awards more than $100,000 annually to participants in trade or undergraduate degree programs.

The NAWIC Education Foundation (NEF) was founded in 1971 and provides construction education for children and adults. For students in Kindergarten through 12th grade and in college, NEF offers Block Kids, a localized building competition for grades K-6; Create Design Build, a construction project for student groups in grades 8-12; and the Design Drafting competition for high school and college students. For adults, NEF offers construction industry certification programs that are accredited through the American Council for Construction Education (ACCE) Professional Development Certification Program.

== Publications ==
NAWIC has two publications: NAWIC Today, a national bimonthly magazine for members and non-members, and The Connection, a biweekly newsletter for members.

== Events ==
NAWIC hosts an annual conference in August and regional conferences twice during the year. In addition, the association sponsors leadership trainings, OSHA trainings, and industry-related webinars.

Women in Construction (WIC) Week, which takes place the first full week of March each year, was established by NAWIC in 1998 to raise awareness and recognize the work of women in the construction industry nationwide. NAWIC and its chapters hold presentations, job tours, luncheons, and virtual events during WIC Week. The week is also celebrated by construction-related companies and media outlets across the US, and by local, state, and national proclamations.

== General References ==
- National Association of Women in Construction (NAWIC), Capital District Chapter Records, 1975-2000. M.E. Grenander Department of Special Collections and Archives, University Libraries, University at Albany, State University of New York (hereafter referred to as the NAWIC, Capital District Chapter Records).
