= Aristomenios Haralampopoulos =

Greek-Australian footballer

Personal information
- Full name: Aristomenios Haralampopoulos
- Date of birth: 20 May 1993 (age 33)
- Place of birth: Adelaide, Australia
- Height: 1.72 m (5 ft 8 in)
- Position: Right back

Team information
- Current team: Cumberland United

Senior career*
| Years | Team | Apps | (Gls) |
| 2011–2013 | West Adelaide | 50 | (1) |
| 2013–2015 | Adelaide Victory | 48 | (6) |
| 2016 | West Adelaide | 5 | (0) |
| 2016–2020 | Acharnaikos | 55 | (2) |
| 2018 | → Apollon Larissa (loan) | 5 | (0) |
| 2020– | Cumberland United | 17 | (0) |
- * Club domestic league appearances and goals as of 4 November 2021 ‡ National team caps and goals as of 10 October 2017

Aristomenios Haralampopoulos (Greek: Αριστομένιος Χαραλαμπόπουλος; born 20 May 1993) is an Australian professional footballer who plays as a defender for Cumberland United.

== Career ==
Haralampopoulos grew up in Adelaide, South Australia, where he attended Scotch College, Adelaide and University Senior College. As a teenager, he was in the youth academy of Bolton Wanderers and was offered a scholarship by Preston North End. He left Adelaide for Greece for a trial at Iraklis. In 2016 he signed for Greek Football League club Acharnaikos before switching to Apollon Larissa in 2018. As of October 2018, he had returned to Acharnaikos where he was named club captain. He returned to Australia in January 2020 and joined Cumberland United in the South Australian National Premier League.
