= Clyde School =

School in St Kilda, Victoria, Australia

Coordinates: 37°21′47″S 144°34′32″E

Information
- Established: 1910
- Closed: 1975
- Gender: Girls

Clyde School was founded as a private girls' school in 1910 in Alma Road, St Kilda, Victoria, Australia, by Isabel Henderson, a leading educationist of her day. It quickly gained a reputation for excellent academic results. The school was relocated to Macedon, near Hanging Rock in 1919.

== Clyde School in Woodend ==
Owing to its founders, the school was aligned with both the Presbyterian and Anglican denominations at this time and it expanded rapidly. By 1917 it had an enrolment of nearly 200 girls spread over five buildings. Partly to relieve overcrowding but mainly to create an educational environment free of the distractions of post-war Melbourne, Isabel Henderson decided to relocate the school. In September 1918 she purchased the former mountain golf resort, Braemar House, near Woodend, and moved her school there in 1919. In 1921 Clyde Woodend became a public school after a vigorous fund-raising campaign by a number of well-connected Old Girls. The following year, Isabel Henderson retired to England and Dorothy Tucker, a domestic science teacher from New Zealand, took over as principal.

Less charismatic than her predecessor, Tucker nevertheless maintained a well-disciplined, conservative boarding school. Enrolments expanded rapidly during the 1920s but the Great Depression saw numbers plummet. Rigorous cost-saving and an austere regime ensured the school’s survival when many other schools closed. The struggles took their toll on Dorothy Tucker who suffered a nervous collapse in 1935. After a short interregnum under Helen Mathieson, the school appointed Olga Hay, a protégé and old family friend of Isabel Henderson, as headmistress in 1937.

Strongly influenced by her forward-thinking mentor Isabel Henderson, Olga Hay began her tenure with a raft of innovations. However, after Henderson’s death in 1940, Olga Hay’s regime became more conservative. During the 1940s and '50s, Clyde School gained a reputation as one of Australia’s most prestigious (and expensive) schools, though not known for high academic achievement. By the time she retired in 1959, Olga Hay had brought great economic success and stability to the school.

Joan Montgomery became principal of Clyde School in 1960 and immediately set about raising academic standards. A highly respected educationist, Montgomery embarked on a modernisation program that included a purpose-built library and science laboratories. Before she left Clyde in 1968, Montgomery recommended that the school open its doors to ‘day girls’ to increase its catchment.

== Closure and amalgamation ==
Alice Pringle took over as principal in 1969. Times were changing, and the school faced financial difficulties. The landed gentry from whom the school sourced its pupils were disappearing. Wool prices were down. Enrolments were static and costs were soaring. Many attempts were made to attract new boarders, but the school was failing financially. In 1975 Clyde School at Woodend closed. The following year, Braemar College, a midrange-fee co-educational day school, opened on the site. It still operates there today.

In 1976 Clyde School, Geelong Church of England Grammar School and Geelong Church of England Girls' Grammar School ("the Hermitage") amalgamated, and today the combined school continues as Geelong Grammar School. Clyde House at Geelong Grammar perpetuates the school’s name.

== School history ==
The Clyde Old Girls’ Association (COGA) continued to operate after the amalgamation and gathered together an impressive set of archives on Clyde School. In 2004 COGA commissioned a history of the school, which was researched and written by Melbourne writer Melanie Guile. Clyde School: An Uncommon History was published by COGA in 2006.

== Headmistresses ==
- Isabel Henderson (1910–23)
- Dorothea Tucker (1923–36)
- Olga Hay (1937–59)
- Joan Montgomery (1960–68)
- G. Pringle (1969–75)

== Houses ==
- Braemar
- Clutha
- Faireleight
- Ingleton

== School journal ==
The Cluthan was the journal of Clyde School and Clyde Old Girls' Association until the school's amalgamation with Geelong Grammar School and the Hermitage in 1976. Since that time it has been the journal of the Old Girls' Association. Its name is derived from the Latin for Clyde, Clutha.

== Notable alumnae ==
- Elisabeth Murdoch, philanthropist
- Peggy Glanville-Hicks, composer
- Joan Lindsay, author
- Ileen Macpherson, pioneer biodynamic and organic farmer
- Mary Turner Shaw, architect
- Veronica Seton-Williams, archaeologist
- Nell Vere Montagu (née Stead), Duchess of Manchester
- Jean Beatson, motorist
- Kathleen Gardiner, motorist
