= Geelong Grammar School =

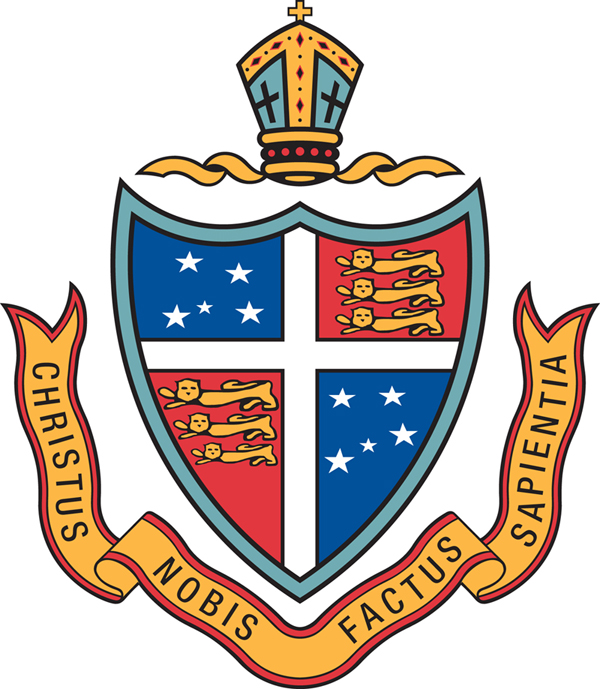

- The main quadrangle and clock tower

Location
- Corio, Victoria; Australia; 38.070222°S 144.398807°E

Information
- Type: private school, co-educational, day and boarding
- Motto: Latin: Christus nobis factus sapientia (1 Corinthians 1:30: "For us, Christ was made wisdom" (1 Corinthians 1:30: Christ, who has been made for us in wisdom))
- Denomination: Anglican
- Established: 1855; 171 years ago
- Founder: Theodore Carlos Benoni Stretch
- Principal: Rebecca Cody
- Years offered: ELC–12
- Gender: Co-educational
- Enrolment: 1,433 (ELC–12)
- Houses: 10 (Senior School), 4 (Middle School), 4, (Bostock House), 5 (Toorak Campus)
- Colour: Light blue
- Slogan: Exceptional Education
- Affiliation: Associated Public Schools of Victoria
- Alumni: Old Geelong Grammarians
- Website: www.ggs.vic.edu.au

Geelong Grammar School is a private Anglican co-educational boarding and day school. The school's main campus is located in Corio on the northern outskirts of Geelong, Victoria, Australia, overlooking Corio Bay and Limeburners Bay.

Established in 1855 under the auspices of the Church of England, Geelong Grammar School has a non-selective enrolment policy and currently caters for approximately 1,500 students from Pre-school to Year 12, including 800 boarders from Years 5 to 12.

In 2009, The Australian declared Geelong Grammar to be the "most expensive school in the nation", charging a fee of almost $29,000 for a Year 12 student. This remains true in 2024, with annual fees coming in at just under $50,000 for day students and $85,000 for boarding students. Among the school's alumni is King Charles III.

In 2017, a Royal Commission into Institutional Responses to Child Sexual Abuse found that Geelong Grammar had failed to act on reports of widespread child sexual abuse.

== History ==
The school was founded in 1855 as a private diocesan school, with the blessing of Bishop Perry, by Theodore Stretch, Archdeacon of Geelong (and the "true founder" of Geelong Grammar), with George Vance as head master and an initial enrolment of fourteen boys. The school grew rapidly and in 1857 it was assigned £5,000 of a government grant for church schools by Perry, the foundation stone was laid for its own buildings and it was transformed into a public school after the British model. The school closed due to financial difficulties in 1860, only to reopen in 1863 with J. Bracebridge Wilson, who had been third master under Vance, as headmaster.

For many years Wilson ran the school at his own expense and through this time boarders came to comprise the greater part of the student body. In 1875 James Lister Cuthbertson joined the staff as Classics master. He had a great influence upon the boys of the school and was much admired and loved by them in spite of his alcoholism. Upon the death of Wilson in 1895, Cuthbertson became acting head master until the appointment of Leonard Harford Lindon early in the next year.

Lindon ran the school for 15 years, but was never fully accepted by the old boys because he lacked the personal warmth with the boys that had been seen with Bracebridge Wilson and Cuthbertson. By the turn of the century the school was outgrowing its buildings in the centre of Geelong, and so it was decided to move. The school council chose to open the head mastership to new applicants. Lindon reapplied but was rejected and Francis Ernest Brown was chosen as the new head master.

In 1909, the school purchased a substantial amount of land in the then rural Geelong suburb of Belmont, bounded by Thomson, Regent and Scott Streets, and Roslyn Road. On 21 October 1910, chairman of the school, W. T. Manifold turned the first sod at the site of what was expected to be a new era for the school. These plans had faded by August 1911, when adjoining rural land was offered for sale as the Belmont Hill Estate. The school council judged that the adjacent suburban subdivision would work against their plans for a boarding school, not one catering for day boys. The decision was rapidly made to buy land on the opposite side of Geelong at Corio, and the land at Belmont was sold for further residential subdivision.

At the end of 1913 the school left its old buildings near the centre of Geelong and opened at its expansive new site at Corio in February 1914. Brown put a greater emphasis on religion than his predecessors, and the new isolated location with its own chapel was ideal for this.

Upon Brown's retirement in 1929 the school council set out to find a 40-year-old married priest as the next head master, but they ended up choosing James Ralph Darling, a 30-year-old layman, then a bachelor (he married in 1935 and had four children). This proved to be a most successful choice and ushered in an era of creativity and massive expansion, following the purchase in 1933, of Bostock House, the Geelong Church of England Grammar Preparatory School in Newtown, and Glamorgan Preparatory School in Toorak in 1946. Darling's boldest initiative was the starting of the Timbertop campus, in the foothills of the Victorian Alps near Mansfield, in 1953. He attracted many acclaimed in their fields to work as masters at the school, including the historian Manning Clark, the musician Sir William McKie, and the artist Ludwig Hirschfeld Mack.

Thomas Ronald Garnett succeeded Darling in 1961. He took the school down a liberal path, most notably in early steps towards co-education, with girls from Geelong Church of England Girls' Grammar School "The Hermitage" taking certain classes at Corio by the early 1970s, but also by making chapel non-compulsory; a policy later reversed. At the start of 1972, co-education was formally introduced when girls were accepted into the two senior years.

Garnett was succeeded by Charles Douglas Fisher, who continued the move towards co-education. In a staff meeting in which the votes for and against co-education were equal, he cast the deciding vote that led to the school accepting girls through all levels. In 1976, after a year of negotiations, GCEGS, GCEGGFS, "The Hermitage" and Clyde School amalgamated. Fisher died as the result of a car accident on the way to Timbertop for an end of year service in 1978.

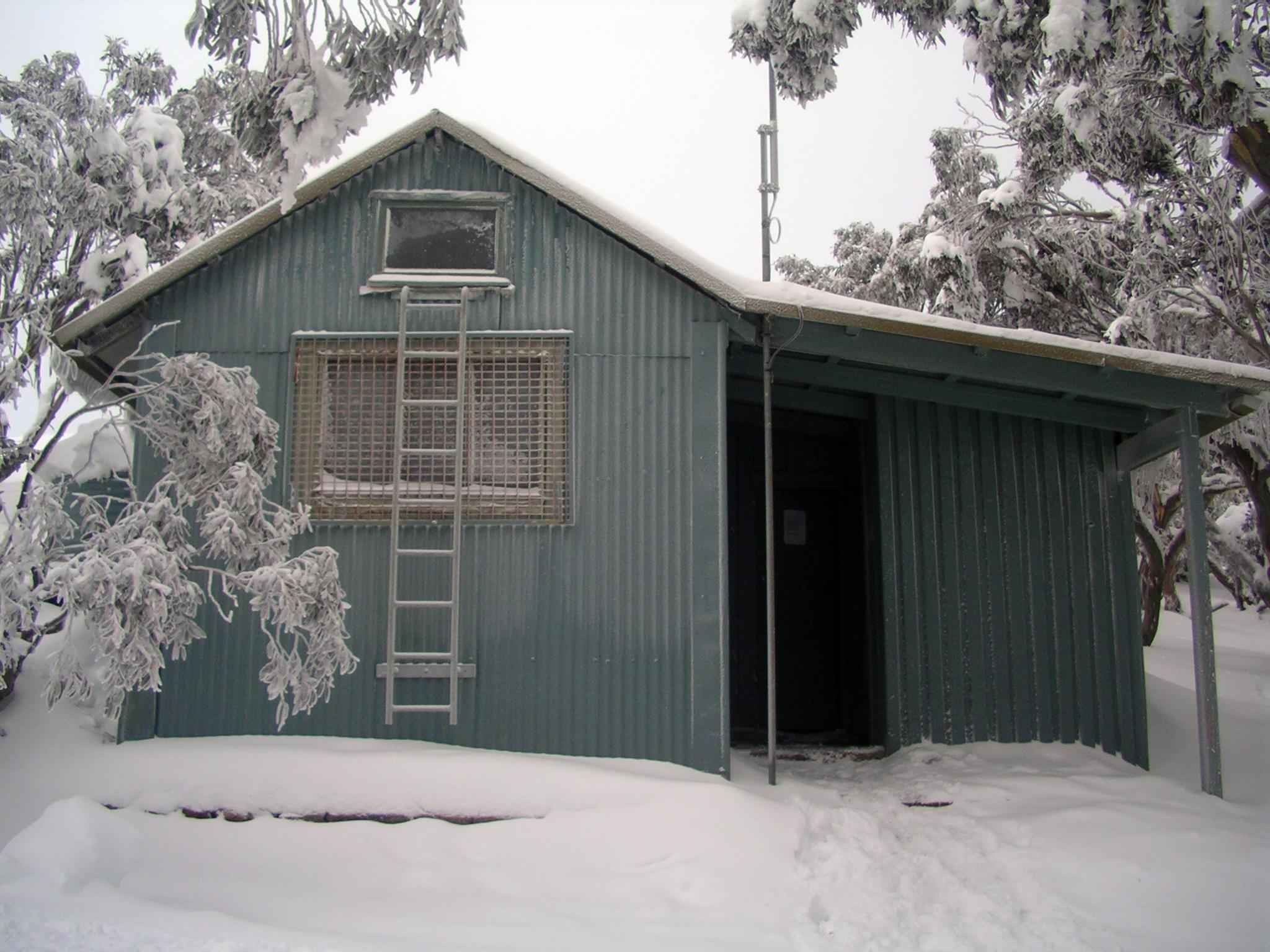
Geelong Grammar School Hut at Mount Stirling

An interregnum of two years was followed by the appointment, in 1980, of John Elliot Lewis (who later became headmaster of Eton College from 1994 to 2002). Under the leadership of Lewis the school set about renovating the boarding and day houses to bring them up to more acceptable modern standards, and there was a focus on improving academic results in addition to the generally rounded education offered. In part, this was achieved through introducing timetable flexibility to allow able later-year high-school students to undertake Victorian Certificate of Education studies ahead of their cohort. The school is now one of 43 high schools in Australia to offer the International Baccalaureate Diploma programme as an alternative to the VCE. The later years of Lewis' head mastership saw an effort (which has been largely successful) to make the school less hierarchical.

The period since Lewis has seen two head masterships of Lister Hannah and Nicholas Sampson and, in 2004, the appointment of Stephen Meek.

In 2018, after 13 1/2 years as Principal, Stephen Meek retired from the School and was replaced by Rebecca Cody. She became the 12th Principal of Geelong Grammar School; the first Australian-born and first female Principal in the School's history.

== Campuses ==
Geelong Grammar School Houses
House name	Campus	Gender	Type	Year Founded	Colour
Austin	Bostock House	Both	Day	1998	
Morres	Bostock House	Both	Day	1998	
School	Bostock House	Both	Day	1998	
Volum	Bostock House	Both	Day	1998	
Glamorgan	Toorak	Both	Day	?	
Alexander	Toorak	Both	Day	?	
Mann	Toorak	Both	Day	?	
McComas	Toorak	Both	Day	?	
Bruce	Toorak	Both	Day	?	
Otway	Middle School	Both	Day	1962	
Highton	Middle School	Both	Day	1998	
Parrwang (Barwon)	Middle School	Boys	Boarding	1934	
Kunuwarra (Connewarre)	Middle School	Girls	Boarding	1934	
Allen	Senior School	Both	Day	1931	
Fraser	Senior School	Both	Day	1963	
Clyde	Senior School	Girls	Boarding	1976	
Elisabeth Murdoch	Senior School	Girls	Boarding	2009	
Garnett	Senior School	Girls	Boarding	1982	
The Hermitage	Senior School	Girls	Boarding	1976	
Cuthbertson	Senior School	Boys	Boarding	1914	
Francis Brown	Senior School	Boys	Boarding	1937	
Manifold	Senior School	Boys	Boarding	1914	
Perry	Senior School	Boys	Boarding	1914	

Geelong Grammar School has four campuses:

- Corio Years 5 to 8 (Middle School) and 10 to 12 (Senior School), boarding and day.
- Bostock House Preschool to Year 4, day.
- Toorak Campus (formerly known as Glamorgan) Preschool to Year 6, day.
- Timbertop Campus (1953-) Year 9, Full-time boarding

The school had planned in the 1990s to open a campus in northern Thailand, but the project was cancelled following the 1997 Asian financial crisis, as the Thai government suspended many major projects.

=== Buildings at Corio ===
Some notable buildings at Corio include:

The Handbury Centre for Wellbeing aka. The Wellbeing Centre

The Handbury Centre for Wellbeing is Geelong Grammar's main centre for sport, health and overall wellbeing. It was opened on 20 April 2008. The Centre comprises a multi purpose sports hall, a FINA-accredited 25 metre pool with diving bowl, a fitness centre, a dance studio, the John Court Café, the GGS Shop and the School's Medical Centre, Kennedy, that also has rooms for counselling services and physiotherapy.

Perry Quad Built in 1913 and extended in the 1930s the Quad is located at the centre of the school between the Dining Hall and the chapel. It houses classrooms, school administration, the Morris Room (staff dining room), three staff residences (The Dovecote, The Eyrie, and the Vicarage), the Hawker Library, and, until 1986, Perry House. The central quadrangle is grassed and there is a fountain in its centre. It is often used for assemblies and plays. The clocktower is on the eastern side of the Perry Quad.

Hawker Library Originally the school library, its décor dates from the 1940s. From 1979 it housed the History Library, and was in 2005 converted into the Michael Collins Persse Archives Centre. The building now houses the Institute of Positive Education.

The Cloisters Linking the Quad and Chapel, the Cloisters are the school's main war memorial. There are plaques commemorating OGGs who died in the First and Second World Wars at either end. The ANZAC Day service is held around the Cloisters every year. Silence is to be maintained at all times in the Cloisters.

Chapel of All Saints

Built in stages between 1914 and 1929 the chapel is at the spiritual centre of the school. All students must attend a weekday service and boarders must also attend on Sundays. The 3 manual organ was originally built by Hill in 1909 and was expanded in 1958 by J. W. Walker.

Dining Hall Built in 1913 and extended in 1933 the Dining Hall is where all Senior School students take meals. There are paintings of all former Head Masters of GGS, as well of some of the school founders, and some the Headmistresses of The Hermitage and Clyde.

Darling Hall Built in the 1960s the Darling Hall serves as the Middle School Dining Hall and Examinations Hall. At its East end is the sanctuary that was originally in the Assembly Hall of The Hermitage.

Music School Built in 1938 and standing out as one of the few buildings at Corio not constructed with red bricks, the Music School contains many small practice rooms, a band room, and the Music Hall, which is used for many concerts by students, staff, and visiting musicians.

Art School Built in 1937 the Art School served as the only centre for art in the school until the construction of the Sinclaire and Hirschfeld Mack Centres in the last 5 years. It remains at the centre of art in the school, being used mostly for painting and drawing.

Fisher Library Built in 1979 and renovated and extended in 2005 the Fisher is now Senior School's sole lending library, now incorporating the collections of the former History Library.

School for Performing Arts and Creative Education (The SPACE)

Completed in May 2015 (replacing the Bracebridge Wilson Theatre), The School for Performing Arts and Creative Education (commonly referred to as The Space), holds two spaces. The 270-seat Studio is named The Bracebridge Wilson Studio, while the larger 800-seat Forum is named The David Darling Play House. The Space is where most school plays and school assemblies are held.

Bracebridge Wilson Theatre Opened in 1978 (replacing the 1890s Bracebridge Wilson Hall, which burnt in 1976), the "BW" was where most school plays and school assemblies were held. It seats approximately 300 people in fixed seating. However, seating capacity can be expanded to accommodate approximately 600 people. With the construction of the School for Performing Arts and Creative Education, the "BW" was made largely redundant.

Cook Quad Built in stages until the 1930s the Cook Quad houses most of the school's Science Department.

== School Song ==
The school song, "Carmen Coriense", is named after Eton College's school song, "Carmen Etonense", and is sung in Latin. The song is typically sung on Founders' Day, which is celebrated on or close to 24 June, marking the date when the foundation stone for the old school in central Geelong was laid. The school choir leads the whole school in singing the song, followed by three cheers for the school's founders.

An official English translation was provided in 2014 by the late Michael Dudley de Burgh Collins Persse (MVO OAM) and J. L. Alsop.

Carmen Coriense
Latin	English
I Salve schola, te pia laude efferamus, Pueri et puellae, usque te amamus; O Corio, praenitens ludo et labore, Floreas virtutibus floreas honore.	I Lord, may we be true to thee, hear your sons and daughters, Faith in all that's good and true, our prayers to you are honoured. O Corio, may we flourish, live in service to you, May we grow in grace and virtue, and forever be true.
II Amne campo litteris praemium merendo, corde mente corpore pariter valendo, sic Corio praenitens laude non carebit, floreat ut floruit, ut floret florebit.	II Lord, we be a torch for thee, guide us with a pure sight, Mind and body, heart and spirit, whole and filled with your light. O Corio, shining brightly, loyal in all we do, May we grow in grace and virtue, and forever be true.

== Headmasters and principals ==
Period	Principal	Country of origin
1855–1862	George Oakley Vance	United Kingdom
1863–1895	John Bracebridge Wilson	United Kingdom
1896–1911	Leonard Harford Lindon	United Kingdom
1912–1929	Francis Ernest Brown	United Kingdom
1930–1961	Sir James Ralph Darling	United Kingdom
1961–1973	Thomas Ronald Garnett	United Kingdom
1974–1980	Charles Douglas Fisher	United Kingdom
1980–1995	John Elliot Lewis	New Zealand
1995–2000	Lister Wellesley Hannah	Tanganyika (present-day Tanzania)
2000–2004	Nicholas Alexander Sampson	United Kingdom
2004–2018	Stephen Donald Andrew Meek	United Kingdom
2018–present	Rebecca Anne Cody	Australia

== Curriculum ==
Geelong Grammar offers its senior students a choice of the International Baccalaureate (IB) or the Victorian Certificate of Education (VCE).

Geelong Grammar School VCE results 2012-2024
Year	Rank	Median study score	Scores of 40+ (%)	Cohort size
2012	92	32	10.7	221
2013	75	33	13.3	220
2014	75	33	13.9	258
2015	80	33	11.8	248
2016	104	32	7.3	230
2017	137	31	8.2	219
2018	146	31	6.9	206
2019	180	30	5.8	195
2020	128	31	8.7	221
2021	89	32	10.6	230
2022	101	32	8.4	227
2023	91	32	10.1	207
2024	101	32	8.7	242

== Extracurricular activities ==
=== Sport ===
Geelong Grammar is a member of the Associated Public Schools of Victoria (APS).

==== APS & AGSV/APS Premierships ====
Geelong Grammar has won the following APS and AGSV/APS* premierships.

Boys:

- Athletics (6) – 1926, 1928, 1936, 1946, 1951, 1954
- Badminton (4) – 1999, 2000, 2001, 2004
- Cricket (8) – 1903, 1906, 1915, 1916, 1961, 1962, 1990, 2014
- Cross Country (1) - 1986
- Football – 1902
- Rowing (30) – 1885, 1886, 1887, 1888, 1889, 1890, 1893, 1894, 1895, 1898, 1914, 1917, 1920, 1922, 1924, 1934, 1935, 1943, 1950, 1953, 1954, 1971, 1974, 1975, 1986, 1987, 1988, 1989, 1991, 1994

Girls:

- Athletics (8) – 1985, 1986, 1987, 1988, 1990, 1991, 1992, 1993
- Badminton (3) – 2002, 2003, 2005
- Cross Country (4) – 1991, 1992, 1995, 1996
- Hockey (2) – 1993, 1994
- Netball (2) – 2012, 2018
- Rowing (23) – 1985, 1986, 1988, 1990, 1991, 1993, 1994, 1995, 1996, 1997, 1998, 2000, 2001, 2007, 2008, 2009, 2010, 2014, 2015, 2016, 2017, 2018, 2019
- Swimming (3) – 1986, 1987, 1988

== School journal ==
The Corian is the journal of the Geelong Grammar School. Published as The Geelong Grammar School Annual (1875–76), The Geelong Grammar School Quarterly (1877–1913) and The Corian (1914–present). Published quarterly from 1877, it reverted to an annual in 1992.

== In popular culture ==
In 2020–2021 filmmakers John Harvey and Rhian Skirving directed the docu-series Off Country for NITV, which screened in 2022 as part of NAIDOC Week. Originally conceived as a feature documentary, the four-part series follows seven Indigenous high school students from around Australia who have left their families to study at Geelong Grammar, over the course of a year in 2020. The series was filmed during the COVID-19 pandemic, which meant that the school year was not a typical school year. The series received good reviews, and Skirving and Harvey received a 2022 ADG Award from the Australian Directors' Guild for the series.

== Notable alumni ==
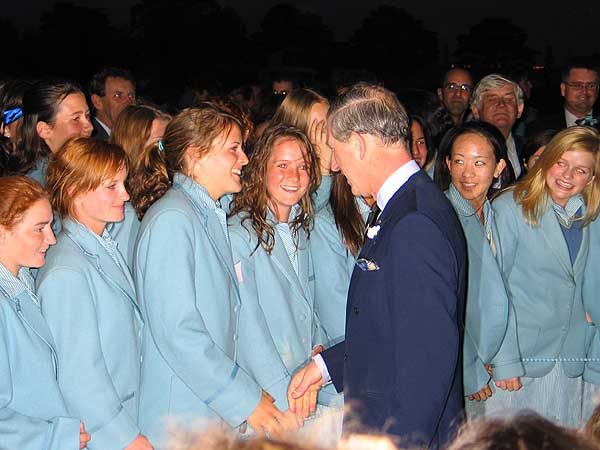
King Charles III, then the Prince of Wales, on a return visit to Geelong Grammar in 2005

Former students of Geelong Grammar and old girls of The Hermitage and Clyde School are known as Old Geelong Grammarians (OGGs), and may elect to join the school's alumni association, the Old Geelong Grammarians Association. Former teachers include the German/Australian artist Ludwig Hirschfeld Mack.

In 2001, The Sun-Herald ranked Geelong Grammar School fourth in Australia's top ten boys' schools, based on the number of its male alumni mentioned in the Who's Who in Australia (a listing of notable Australians). Among the school's notable alumni are Charles III, King of Australia; media mogul Rupert Murdoch; actress Portia de Rossi; John Gorton, Prime Minister of Australia 1968–1971; Mizan Zainal Abidin of Terengganu, King of Malaysia 2006–2011; Tim Macartney-Snape, mountaineer and author; billionaire businessman Kerry Packer; singer-songwriter Missy Higgins; Entrepreneur and Climate 200 Founder Simon Holmes à Court. Jock Landale; NBA Center for the Atlanta Hawks; Barkly Regional Council Mayor Elected November 2024 Sid Vashist.

== Sexual abuse ==
In 2016 the Royal Commission into Institutional Responses to Child Sexual Abuse examined Geelong Grammar School's handling of allegations of sexual abuse between the 1950s and early 2000s. Thirteen former students and several parents gave evidence describing abuse across the Corio, Highton, Timbertop and Glamorgan (Toorak) campuses between 1956 and 1989. The Commission described the school's culture during this period as "authoritarian" and "devoid of pastoral care," which discouraged reporting.

=== Convicted staff ===
Five staff members were convicted of child-sexual offences against Geelong Grammar students:

- Graham Leslie Dennis – teacher and resident master at Bostock House in the 1950s; convicted in 2008 of gross indecency and indecent assault involving two boys.
- John Hamilton Buckley – housemaster at Glamorgan during the 1980s; pleaded guilty in 2015 to indecent assault, gross indecency, sexual penetration of a child aged 10–16, including the production and possession of child pornography; sentenced to seven years and six months' imprisonment.
- John Fitzroy Clive ("Jonathan") Harvey – mathematics teacher and Allen House housemaster (1969–2004); pleaded guilty in 2007 to ten counts of gross indecency against a student between 1976 and 1978.
- Philippe Trutmann – boarding-house assistant at Highton (1985–1996); pleaded guilty in 2005 to 41 child-sex offences against 40 boys and possession of hundreds of pornographic images and videos of children; sentenced to six and a half years' imprisonment and again convicted in 2011 of indecent assault.
- Stefan van Vuuren – teacher in 2007; convicted in 2008 after secretly photographing female students during a field trip; received a nine-month community-based order.

=== Other alleged perpetrators and failures of oversight ===
Roger Digges (identified by pseudonym in Commission materials) was accused by multiple former students of sexual abuse between 1968 and 1980. After a classroom incident in which he exposed himself, Digges was dismissed around 1974 but later allowed renewed access to students at Glamorgan in 1980. Ivan Sutherland, then Head of Glamorgan, told the Royal Commission that he knew Digges had previously been dismissed for misconduct "probably sexual in nature," yet he allowed him to work with pupils and to take boys off-campus for unsupervised activities during which further abuse occurred. The Commission found this constituted a grave failure of judgment and duty of care.

Sutherland acknowledged in his own submission that he had a personal relationship with Digges, including that Digges was godfather to one of Sutherland's children. This relationship is also recorded in the survivor BIR submission. These details are documented in the submissions, not in the Commission's formal findings.

In 1997 a former student (BIR) reported abuse by Digges from 1980. The school's records confirmed that Digges had been allowed access to pupils and might later have been imprisoned for paedophilia. The school withheld this information and instead settled his claim for A$32,000 without disclosure—conduct the Commission said showed that the school "preferred its financial interests to the interests of the victim."

Other staff named in evidence included Rev John Davison, Max Guzelian, Rev Norman Smith, Andrew MacCulloch, David Brian Mackey and "BIJ". Some had died before investigation concluded; none were convicted in relation to these allegations.

=== Institutional response ===
The Royal Commission found that Geelong Grammar's leadership—particularly principal John Lewis (1980–94)—repeatedly failed to investigate or report credible allegations to police or the school council. Accused teachers were often retained, transferred or financially compensated rather than reported to authorities. Before 1994 the school had no formal child-protection policy; its first mandatory-reporting framework was introduced only after Victorian legislative change that year. The Commission concluded that the school "placed its own interests ahead of those of victims," prioritising reputation and liability protection over student safety.

Later principals introduced pastoral-care and reporting procedures, Working with Children Checks and mandatory Victorian Institute of Teaching registration, but the Commission noted there was still no system for monitoring compliance or evaluating effectiveness.

In August 2015 headmaster Stephen Meek stated that the school "absolutely condemns any form of abuse that has occurred at the school in the past" and regretted that "not all students received the care and support to which they were entitled." However, minutes from a 2007 school-council meeting recorded him reporting that litigation by some of Trutmann's 41 victims had been settled for about A$350,000 and that "overall this has been a very satisfactory financial outcome for the school."

== Associations ==
Geelong Grammar School is a member of the Headmasters' and Headmistresses' Conference, the Junior School Heads Association of Australia (JSHAA), the Australian Boarding Schools' Association (ABSA), the Association of Heads of Independent Schools of Australia (AHISA), the Association of Independent Schools of Victoria (AISV), and is a founding member of the Associated Public Schools of Victoria (APSV). The school is also a member of the G20 Schools Group. The school has offered the International Baccalaureate (IB) since February 1997.

== See also ==
- Chapel of All Saints
- Eton blue
- Eton College
- Geelong College
- List of schools in Victoria, Australia
- Lists of schools in Australia
- List of boarding schools
- List of Old Geelong Grammarians
- Braemar College
- The Hermitage
- Old Geelong
- Timbertop
