= Norman Davison (footballer) =

Australian rules footballer

Personal information
- Full name: Norman McNicol Davison
- Born: 17 February 1888; Brisbane, Queensland
- Died: 20 December 1958 (aged 70); Holborn, London, UK
- Original team: Mercantile / Geelong Grammar

Playing career^{1}
Years	Club	Games (Goals)
1906	Geelong	1 (1)
- ^{1} Playing statistics correct to the end of 1906.

Norman McNicol Davison (17 February 1888 – 20 December 1958) was an Australian rules footballer who played with Geelong in the Victorian Football League (VFL).
