= The Hermitage (Australia) =

Geelong Church of England Girls' Grammar School
- The Hermitage
- The school badge and motto - Esse quam videri

Location
- Victoria; Australia
- 38°8′58″S 144°20′45″E

Information
- Motto: Latin: Esse quam videri
- Religious affiliation: Anglican
- Established: 14 February 1906
- Closed: 1976

Geelong Church of England Girls' Grammar School, The Hermitage was founded in 1906. It was first proposed in a meeting between the Archbishop of Melbourne, Henry Lowther Clarke, and the Head Master of Geelong Church of England Grammar School, L. H. Lindon and opened with Sidney Austin as first Chairman Council and Elsie Morres as first Headmistress.

The Hermitage, a mansion in Newtown built for the Armytage family, was bought for £6,000 with the same amount being spent on wiring and furnishing the building and constructing an assembly hall. The school advanced the education of girls in Australia in many ways including being the first girls' school to have a uniform and to have compulsory team sports. The curriculum combined academic subjects, crafts, and home economics, aiming to provide both what Miss Morres thought of as a serious education as given to boys and those things the families expected their girls to learn to be good wives.

In 1970, Krome House, the new middle school, was opened in Highton and in 1973 the rest of the school moved to the site. In 1976 C.E.G.G.S. "The Hermitage" amalgamated with Geelong Church of England Grammar School and Clyde School, which continue to-day as Geelong Grammar School.

== Headmistresses ==
- Miss Elsie Morres (1906–1933)
- Miss Anne Peterson (1933–1942)
- Miss Victoria Krome (1942–1962)
- Mrs F.L. Coggin (1962–1968)
- Miss Elizabeth Britten (1968–1975)

== Houses ==
Mottoes in brackets

- Austin (Honour above honours)
- Morres (The chain is as strong as its weakest link)
- School (Play up, play up, and play the game)
- Volum (Non sibi, sed toti) Not for self, but for all

== Coo-ee School Journal ==
Journal of The Hermitage published from 1910 until the school's amalgamation with Geelong Grammar School and Clyde School in 1976. Its title is shared with the school song, also Coo-ee.
