= National Association of Women in Construction (New Zealand) =

The National Association of Women in Construction (New Zealand) (NAWIC New Zealand) is a professional association for women in the field of construction. The purpose of the association is to support women in construction through networking, professional education, and mentorship.

NAWIC New Zealand has been active in Wellington since 1996. Stacey Mendonca was one of three co-founders. It has a national governance council, an operations team and regional chapters in Auckland, Waikato, Bay of Plenty, Manawatū, Wairarapa, Wellington, Canterbury, Queenstown Lakes and Otago.

NAWIC New Zealand runs the National Association of Women in Construction (New Zealand) Excellence Awards.
