= Howy =

Howy is a name. Notable people with this name include:

- Godfrey George Howy Irving (1867–1937), Australian army officer
- Howy Parkins, American animation director
- Martin Howy Irving (1831–1912), English rower and educationist
- Sybil Howy Irving (1897–1973), Australian army officer
