= Isla Victoria Murphy =

(1913-1967) lawyer and army officer

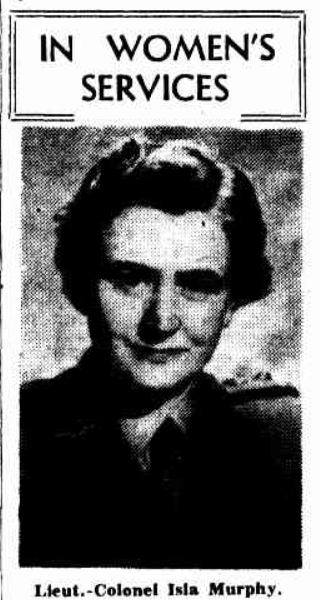
Isla Murphy as pictured in a 1945 newspaper article

Isla Victoria Murphy (17 July 1913 – 4 January 1967) was an Australian woman who was a lawyer, during a period it was unusual for women to be so, and officer within the Australian Women's Army Service who was recognised early as a leader and ended her war service as a lieutenant colonel.

== Early life ==
Murphy was born in St Kilda, a suburb of Melbourne, and was the eldest of ten children born to Thomas Murphy and his wife Victoria Sarah (née Noonan). Her father worked as a medical doctor and she attended school at Presentation College, Windsor where she was identified as a bright child and, when she finished there she was named dux.

Murphy then went on to study law at the University of Melbourne where she completed her bachelor of art (honours) in 1933, her bachelor of laws in 1934 and her masters in 1935. She was admitted to the Bar as a solicitor on 1 May 1936. She then practised at her uncle's law firm, Luke Murphy & Co, where they ironically named her 'the best man in the office'.

== Australian Women's Army Service ==
Despite her professional career, Murphy was driven to contribute to the war effort during World War II and, soon after it was created, joined the Australian Women's Army Service (AWAS) on 21 November 1941.

Soon after she enlisted, Murphy was one of 29 women chosen by the AWAS controller Sybil Irving to be core leaders. Because of this, Murphy was selected to attend the first officers' course which was held at Yarra Junction and, in January 1942, she was made a captain. As captain she served as second-in-command under Maude Kathleen Deasey at the Southern Command in Melbourne. Here one of her primary responsibilities was interviewing and enlisting recruits.

On 1 March 1943 she was promoted to major and was appointed the deputy assistant adjutant-general (of the women's services) and played a key role in drafting regulations for the AWAS. Later, in September 1944, she replaced Kathleen Best as the assistant adjutant-general and was also made a temporary lieutenant colonel; this position became substantive in September 1945.

In January 1946 Murphy travelled with Irving to New Guinea to help in the rehabilitation of service women there. Then, on 7 September 1946, she transferred to the reserves.

== Post war career ==
After the war Murphy intended to return to practising law and attended a refresher course at the University of Melbourne. Here she met Horace Arthur Wimpole, who was also a solicitor, who had been a prisoner of war in Burma. They married on 16 September 1947 and, after their marriage, she devoted much of her time caring for her husband who was suffering from ill health after imprisonment and caring for their two children. She did not return to practising law.

Murphy was very involved with the Lyceum Club and was vice-president between 1957 and 1960.

== Later life ==
Murphy died on 4 January 1967 at Toorak.
