= Margaret Spencer (disambiguation) =

Margaret Spencer (1472–1536) was the daughter of Sir Robert Spencer.

Margaret Spencer may also refer to:

- Margaret Beale Spencer, American psychologist
- Margaret Fulton Spencer (1882–1966), American architect and painter
- Margaret Spencer, Countess Spencer, 19th/20th century wife of Charles Spencer, 6th Earl Spencer
- Peggy Spencer (1920–2016), British ballroom dancer, choreographer, competition adjudicator and organiser
- Margaret Lynn von der Heide Spencer-Galanes (born 1954), American cross country skier
- Margaret Joan Spencer (1912–1990), officer in the Australian Women's Army Service
- Margaret Meek Spencer, British educationalist
