= Anti-aircraft defences of Australia during World War II =

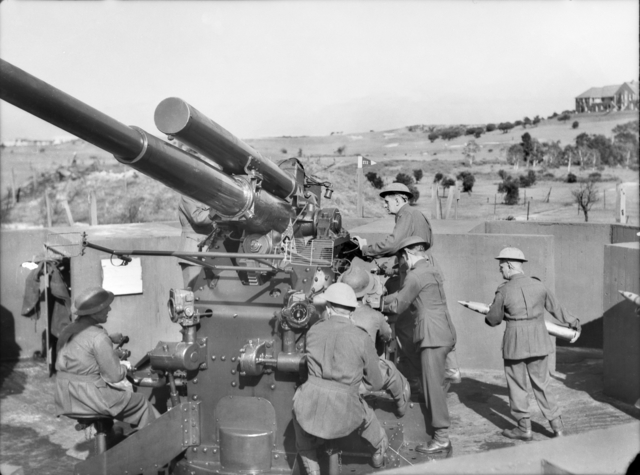
Members of the Volunteer Defence Corps training with a 3.7 Inch anti-aircraft gun emplaced on Kensington Golf Links in Sydney during May 1943

The following is a list of anti-aircraft defences of Australia during World War II. (Note: Anti-aircraft organisation as it existed in late-1942.) Prior to the war Australia possessed only very limited air defences. However, by late-1942 an extensive anti-aircraft defence organisation had been developed, with anti-aircraft batteries in place around all the major cities as well as the key towns in northern Australia. A total of two Heavy Anti-Aircraft (HAA) regiments, 32 static HAA batteries, 11 Light Anti-Aircraft (LAA) regiments, 16 independent LAA batteries, three anti-aircraft training regiments and one anti-aircraft training battery were formed. These units were equipped with a range of weapon systems including 3.7 inch anti-aircraft guns and 40 mm Bofors guns. In addition six American anti-aircraft battalions were stationed in Australia, operating in Fremantle, Darwin, Townsville, and Brisbane.

A number of anti-aircraft batteries were subsequently involved in dealing with the threat of Japanese air raids against northern Australia during 1942 and 1943, shooting down 29 enemy aircraft, probably destroying another 27 aircraft and damaging 32 between January 1942 and the end of 1943. Batteries in New Guinea also saw extensive action. However, as the war progressed and the threat from Japanese aircraft subsided, the manning of anti-aircraft defences in Australia was reduced to release manpower for other branches of the Army and for industry, and was increasingly taken over by Australian Women's Army Service or Volunteer Defence Corps personnel. Most batteries were disbanded between mid-1944 to late 1945.

== New South Wales ==
- Sydney AA Group
  - 103rd HAA Regiment
  - 108th, 110th and 111th LAA Regiments
  - 1st, 7th, 9th, 15th, 20th and 25th AA Batteries
- Newcastle AA Group
  - 3rd, 7th and 18th AA Batteries
  - 22nd LAA Battery
- Kembla AA Group
  - 8th AA Battery
  - 221st LAA Battery

== Victoria ==
- Melbourne AA Group
  - 112th LAA Regiment
  - 10th, 11th and 30th AA Batteries

== Queensland ==
- South Queensland AA Group
  - 2/2nd HAA Regiment
  - 113th and 114th LAA Regiments
  - 6th, 38th AA Batteries
- North Queensland AA Group
  - 34th, 35th, 36th and 37th AA Batteries
  - 223rd, 224th and 226th LAA Batteries

== South Australia ==
- 12th and 26th AA Batteries

== Western Australia ==
- Fremantle AA Group
  - 2/3rd, 109th and 116th LAA Regiments
  - 4th, 5th and 29th AA Batteries
  - 66 SL Battery

== Tasmania ==
- 13th AA Battery

== Northern Territory ==
- Darwin AA Group
  - 2/1st LAA Regiment
  - 2nd, 14th and 22nd AA Batteries
  - 225th and 233rd LAA Batteries

== New Guinea ==
- Port Moresby AA Group
  - 23rd and 32nd AA Batteries
  - 2/4th HAA Battery
  - 2/7th, 234th and 156th LAA Batteries
- Milne Bay AA Group
  - 33rd, 23rd (det) AA Batteries

== See also ==
- Structure of the Australian Army during World War II
- Coastal defences of Australia during World War II

== Notes ==
Footnotes

Citations
