= Lorna Byrne (broadcaster) =

Australian agriculture expert and radio broadcaster (1897–1989)

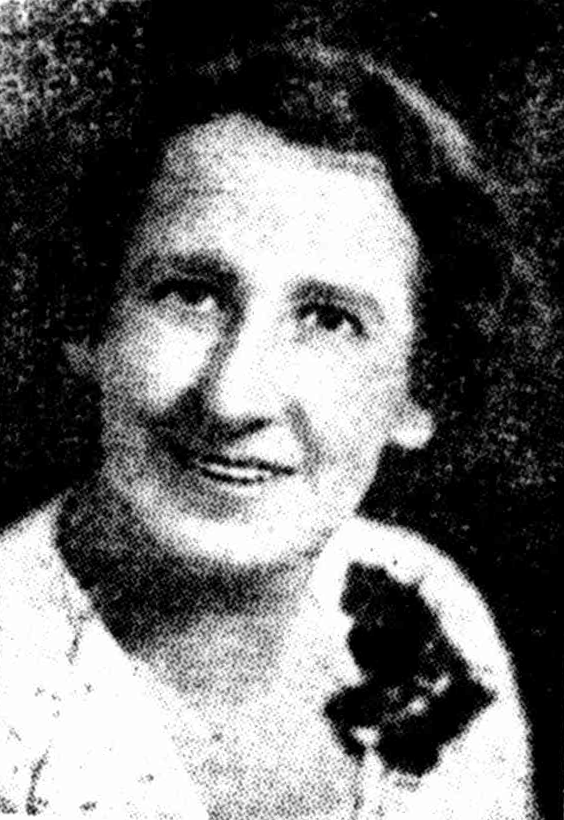
- Born: 27 December 1897; Quirindi, New South Wales, Australia
- Died: 15 July 1989 (aged 91); Mona Vale, New South Wales, Australia
- Other name: Lorna Hayter
- Education: University of Sydney
- Occupations: agricultural scientist, Army Major and radio and print journalist
- Spouse: Stanley Ward Hayter

Lorna Byrne CBE (27 December 1897 – 15 July 1989) was an Australian agricultural scientist, a Major in the Australian Women's Army Service and a radio broadcaster. After working with Australian Red Cross she had a weekly radio programme for over a decade before running the women's section of The Land newspaper for another ten years.

== Life ==
Byrne was born in Quirindi in New South Wales. She was the last of ten children and her elder sister Ethel became a notable physician and pathologist. Her parents were Margaret (born Crennan) and James Byrne and they had both been born in New South Wales. Her father was a teacher. She left what is now Maitland Grossmann High School with a scholarship to qualify as a teacher at the University of Sydney. She was one of the first two women to graduate in agricultural science from the University of Sydney in 1921. She had part of her practical training at the (all male) Hawkesbury Agricultural College.

In 1927, she became the first person in the Bureau of Agriculture appointed to organise for women's interests. She gave educational talks and later radio broadcasts. In 1939-40 she was presenting programmes on 2FC which became part of Radio National. She also organized leadership camps for girls across Australia.

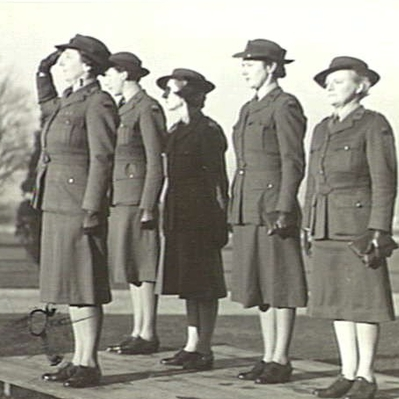
Major Lorna Byrne taking the salute on May 27, 1943, with the Australian Women's Army Service

In 1941 she joined the Australian Women's Army Service and in 1942 she became Major Lorna Byne in 1942 when she was an assistant controller and 2nd in command to Sybil Irving who had founded the AWAS. On 27 May 1943 she received the salute as she left headquarters in Melbourne to take up the command in Western Australia.

She married Stanley Ward Hayter in 1948 but it was a short marriage as he died in 1951. As a widow she made some foreign travel she returned to broadcasting in 1953 as "Lorna Byrne". She had a fifteen-minute weekly slot that was titled "Country Women’s Session". The weekly talks continued until 1966 with a late name change to "Farm and Home" from 1964. At the came time she organised the public relations for the Australian Red Cross Society. Leaving radio she moved into print journalism from 1961 when she was The Land's women's editor for a decade.

Byrne became a CBE in 1980 and died in Mona Vale in 1989.
