= Kathleen Fowler =

Australian Army officer

- Born: c. 1925
- Died: 17 November 2012 (aged 87); Melbourne, Victoria
- Military career
- Allegiance: Australia
- Branch: Australian Women's Army Service; Women's Royal Australian Army Corps
- Service years: 1943–1947; 1951–1977
- Rank: Colonel
- Commands: Women's Royal Australian Army Corps (1972–77)
- Conflicts: Second World War
- Awards: Member of the Order of Australia

Kathleen May Fowler, AM (c. 1925 – 17 November 2012) was an Australian military officer. She served as director of the Women's Royal Australian Army Corps and was appointed a Member of the Order of Australia in 1975. She is credited with introducing maternity leave in the Australian army service.

Military offices
| Preceded by Colonel Dawn Jackson | Director of the Women's Royal Australian Army Corps; 1972–1977 | Succeeded by Colonel Barbara Maxwell |
