= Nellie Elizabeth Stronach =

Australian army officer (1892–1991)

Nellie Elizabeth Stronach MBE (28 March 1892 – 20 November 1991) was an Australian officer in the Australian Women's Army Service. She later worked as a welfare officer for the YWCA in Japan.

== Early life and career ==
Stronach was the only child of John Stronach, a marine engineer who had immigrated from Scotland, and his wife Helen née McDonald. She was born in Balmain, a suburb of Sydney, and attended private school until she was 12 and, after this, she was educated by a governess until the age of 15. Because of her father's heritage and the work that he did Stronach and her family spent significant periods in Scotland during her childhood.

In 1908, when Stronach was 16, the family moved to Ballina, likely for her father's work and there she ran an infants' school. She became involved in the music scene there and sang at various concerts, functions and music festivals. During World War I, in which she lost her fiancé, she volunteered with the Australian Red Cross and the Girls' Patriotic League of which she was president.

In 1920 the family returned to Sydney where, alongside caring for her aging parents, Stronach became a partner in a tea and sandwich shop. In 1930 she joined the Young Women's Christian Association in Sydney and she ran their cafeteria from about 1935. This was possible as both her parents died in the 1930s which freed her from her caring responsibilities.

== The Australian Women's Army Service ==
During World War II Stronach was 50 and considered to old to serve. To circumvent this she put her age back to 43 to be eligible to join the Australian Women's Army Service where she enlisted on 6 March 1942. She served first as a cook within the 2nd Ambulance Car Company, where she worked between Sydney and Tamworth. By June she was promoted to sergeant and then applied for a commission, but her true age was discovered and it was rejected.

Despite this, promotion did continue and in May 1943 Stronach became a warrant officer and, in July 1943, was posted to the Australian Defence Canteens Service Club in Sydney. In September 1944 she was transferred to the Australian Army Canteens Service Women's Club in Melbourne.

Stronach was discharged on 27 April 1945.

== Post World War II ==
After the war Stronach became a YWCA philanthropic representative and worked with the army women's services. In this role she initially worked through a number of barracks in New South Wales and Victoria before, in 1947, she travelled to Japan as a YWCA welfare officer. In Japan she worked alongside the British Commonwealth Occupation Force at the 130th Australian General Hospital in Kure (a city within the Hiroshima Prefecture).

At the hospital she supported nursing and medical staff and taught 'Western-style' cooking and social customs to the Japanese brides and fiancés of Australian servicemen. In 1952 she was awarded an Order of the British Empire for ‘service to the troops far beyond the normal call of duty’.

She remained in Kure until November 1953. She was a very popular staff member and was called 'Stronnie' by many.

Back in Sydney Stronach continued to work in various roles until her retirement in 1976, aged 84.

She died on 20 November 1991 at Parramatta.
