= Joyce Ethel Whitworth =

Australian army officer (1911–1998)

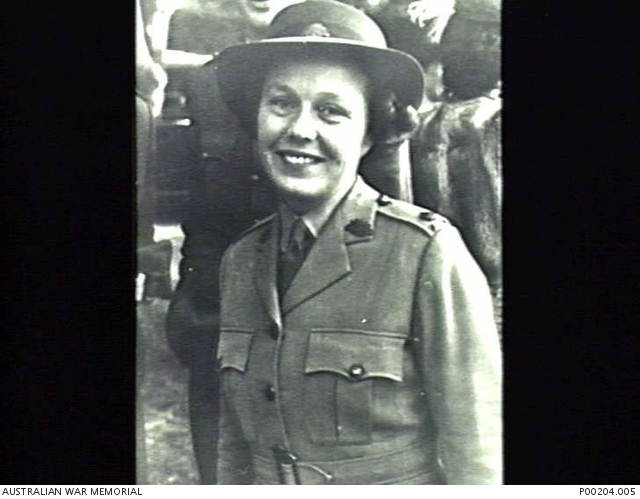
Joyce Whitworth in 1945

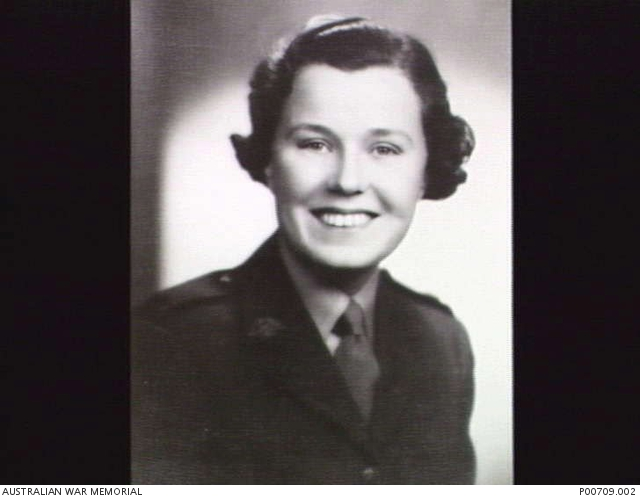
Joyce Whitworth in 1944

Joyce Ethel Whitworth MBE (30 May 1911 – 19 September 1998) was an Australian woman and officer within the Women's Australian National Service and later the Australian Women's Army Service. After the war she became a farmer and was involved in community service for the rest of her life.

== Early life ==
Whitworth was born in Randwick, a suburb of Sydney, and was the second of three daughters born to John and Florence Sophia (née Miller) Whitworth; both of whom were born in New Zealand. Her father worked as a racehorse training and, when the family experienced financial difficulties, she was forced to withdraw from the Sydney Church of England Girls Grammar School in Darlinghurst around the age of 16. At 18, in 1929, she began training as a nurse at the Royal Alexandra Hospital for Children but her traineeship was ended after she contracted and had to recover from scarlet fever. In this same period she also cared for her father, who died in May 1938, before undertaking a secretarial course and becoming a stenographer and secretary.

== World War II service ==
In June 1940 Whitworth joined the Women's Australian National Service where she participated in outdoor exercises and undertook courses in map-reading, signalling and military administration. She was soon promoted to honorary lieutenant and, by June 1941, honorary captain and commandant of the Eastern Suburbs defence unit which was made up of over 100 women. Whitworth would later state that her experience and training, and that of other women like her, with the WANS was essential to the early success of the AWAS.

In August 1941 Whitworth volunteered for the newly formed Australian Women's Army Service following her recommendation by Margaret Loder Wakehurst who called her a 'born leader' and 'very steady and dependable'. There she was made a captain in January of 1942 and soon after she was appointed chief instructor of an AWAS recruit training school in Killara.

In July 1942 Whitworth was promoted to temporary major, a role that would become permanent in 1944, and from September 1942 took over the 2nd AWAS Training Battalion where she gained the nickname 'Bertha Blitz'. For the remainder of the war she worked in various positions in one of which she met and formed a close friendship with Barbara Gilchrist Donkin, a captain within the Australian Army Medical Women's Service and they became lifelong companions.

== Post World War II ==
When Whitworth was demobbed and moved to the reserves on 28 June 1946 both Whitworth and Donkin, alongside Donkin's mother a brother, purchased a small farm in Dural where, with the help of a small government allowance from the army and family support. This was in part because within the AWAS Whitworth had been so poorly paid that she came out in debt. Whitworth said of this:

[V]ery few of us wanted to go back to what we'd been doing before the war. Some had lost their husbands or… fiancés and their lives were virtually changed. There was a change of direction. Those who had been fortunate enough to keep their husbands and fiancés were quite happy to go back and be wives and mothers. But others of us wanted to do something different

— Joyce Ethel Whitworth, from her 1990 oral history interview

At the farm, which was 35.5 acres (14.4 ha), they grew fruit trees and raised animals and Whitworth called them peasant farmers and stated that they worked seven days a week.

In January 1949 Whitworth became engaged to Roland Maclean, a solicitor practicing in Sydney, but the pair never married.

Whitworth was also very active in community and church affairs and was a member of the parish council of her local church and the head of the women's fellowship there. She was also involved in many social functions for ex-AWAS officers from 1948 onwards and was president of the AWAS Association of New South Wales between 1959 and 1971; although she continued her involvement for the rest of her life becoming a patron and later life member. In 1989 she also became a patron of the Council of Ex-Servicewomen's Associations.

Whitworth was also an ongoing volunteer for the Girl Guides Australia where in 1960, when she was serving on the state council, she established and directed a girls' developmental program in which she worked alongside Eleanor Manning (another former AWAS officer). She also later served on the Guides federal executive and for this service she was made an Member of the Order of the British Empire on 8 June 1968 for her services to the community.

In 1981 Whitworth and Donkin retired and moved to a retirement village in Castle Hill, where they lived in nearby units and Whitworth continued to volunteer. She died on 19 September 1998.
