= Beryl Noble =

Australian army officer (1907–1984)

Beryl Margaret Elizabeth Noble née McCann (21 December 1907 – 12 February 1984) was an Australian officer in the Australian Women's Army Service and later a grazier in Victoria.

== Early life ==
Noble was born in Geelong West, in Victoria, and was the eldest child of Wesley Burrett McCann, who worked as a manager, and his wife Zeta née Manchester both of whom were prominent in Geelong society. She attended school at The Hermitage, which was nearby, and was head prefect in 1926. She also played baseball on the school's team.

After completing school she attended the University of Melbourne where she graduated with a Bachelor of Arts in 1932. Following graduation she worked at 3AW on a women's radio show called The Women's Sessions where she worked alongside Gwen Varley. A short time afterwards she travelled overseas and was there when World War II broke out and returned to Australia 'on the last trip back'. Initially, on her return, she volunteered with the Red Cross in Melbourne.

== The Australian Women's Army Service ==
On 6 June 1942 Noble enlisted into the Australian Women's Army Service (AWAS) and she was appointed into a clerical position. Soon after, in September 1942, she became an acting sergeant and an acting lieutenant in October. In November 1942 Noble attended an officer training course and then joined the 5th Administrative Cadre where she worked in recruitment and established the pilot course for the newly established Supervisory Personnel School which aimed to train women in leadership and supervisory roles. On 30 August 1943 she was appointed the school's chief instructor and was officer-in-charge of the seven courses it ran.

With the school established, Noble continued to travel around Australia, to every state, to recruit more women to the AWAS and to select volunteers for training as supervisors within the Australian Army Provost Corps, which also known as the Royal Australian Corps of Military Police. She continued to receive promotions and in October 1943 was made temporary captain and then captain in April 1944.

In January 1945 Noble was appointed the deputy assistant adjutant general for Army Women's Services within the Melbourne-based Directorate of Rehabilitation; she was the first woman to hold this role.

At the end of the war Noble transferred to the reserve on 13 November 1945 and was then placed on the retired list of 17 September 1956.

== Life post war ==
After the war Noble managed Frogmore, a large grazing property, in Fyansford in Victoria. Around this time Noble learned that her fiancé from before the war, John Steel, who had already been listed as missing in action, had died in Thailand as a Japanese prisoner of war.

On 31 October 1951 Noble married John William Noble, a grazier and they did not have children together.

She died on 12 February 1984 in Anglesea.
