= Freda Irving =

Australian journalist (1903–1984)

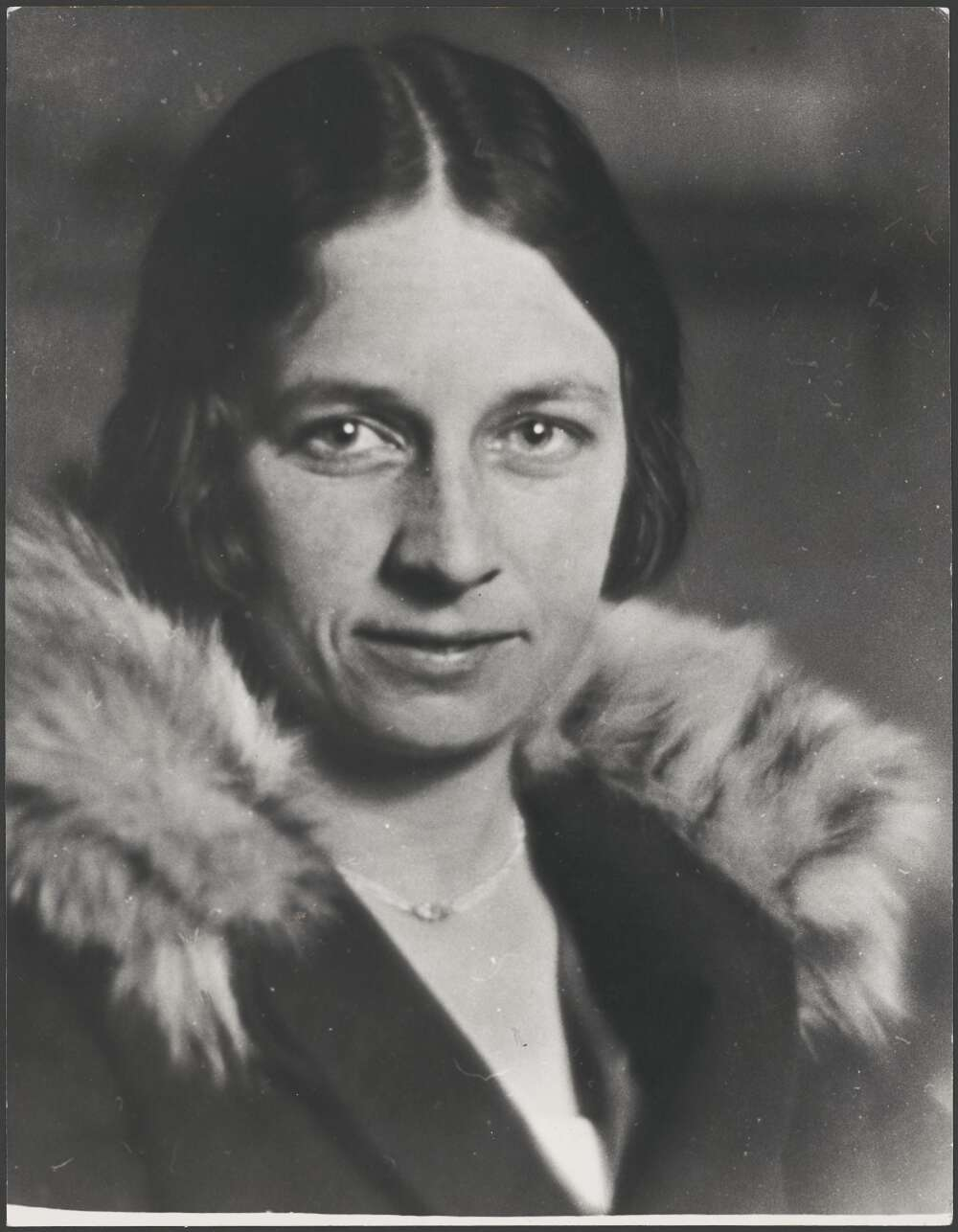
Portrait of journalist Freda Irving, Melbourne, 1929

Freda Mary Howy Irving MBE (16 September 1903 – 26 September 1984) was an Australian journalist and editor who spent much of her career working at The Sun News-Pictorial and The Argus (Melbourne).

Irving was also a captain in the Australian Women's Army Service.

== Early life ==
Irving was born at the Victoria Barracks in Melbourne and was the third and final child of Godfrey Irving and his wife Ada Minnie Margueritha née Derham. She attended school at Lauriston Girls’ School.

== Career ==
After completing her studied Irving became a journalist after being inspired by a meeting the woman's editor of The Evening Sun, which led to her beginning to be employed by them in 1925. There she became a journalist and social writer and, in 1932 when it was renamed the Sun News-Pictorial. she became the social editor.

In 1936 she was sent by The Herald (Melbourne) to cover the Abdication of Edward VIII which was seen by many as her 'big break'.

In 1940, due to World War II, she became of publicity officer for the Victorian branch of the Australian Red Cross and, in 1943, joined the Australian Women's Army Service which was led by her sister Sybil Irving and she served on her staff as the amenities officer and later within the directorate of public relations; during the war she also spent two years in Papua New Guinea. In December 1945 she left the army as a captain.

In 1946 Irving returned to the Sun News-Pictorial before, after doing some freelance work for them, moved across The Argus (Melbourne) in 1948 where she worked under Gladys Hain on its women's magazine. She was known to encourage the staff under her, particularly women, to write and investigate about stories of importance to women and to write detailed profiles of women. One of her protegees was Betty Olive Osborn. Experiencing poor health Irving took a break from journalism in 1952 and worked briefly as a farmer but soon rejoined to cover Queen Elizabeth II 1954 royal tour of Australia.

When The Argus closed in 1957 Irving was then the Women's editor and she made sure that every member of her team got a job elsewhere. After the papers closure Irving herself struggled to find work and she referred to this condition as being 'on the beach' and she took a role in public relations between 1958 and 1963 before becoming a Melbourne editor of The Australian Women's Weekly between 1963 and 1965. During these periods she also ran a licensed grocery store at Croydon.

Irving returned to journalism in 1967 and worked for a variety of newspapers ad magazines including the Melbourne Observer, The Age and POL. She also wrote a gossip page for The Sun-Herald, a newspaper based in Sydney.

In 1972 Irving became the first president of the Melbourne Press Club and in 1981 was appointed a Order of the British Empire for her services to journalism.

Irving died on 26 September 1984 at Kilmore.

== Collections ==
- Papers of Freda Irving, 1921-1984. [manuscript]. are held at the State Library Victoria.
- A collection of biographical cuttings about Irving and a 1980 oral history interview with Irving are held at the National Library of Australia.
