= Barbara Maxwell =

Australian military officer and instructor (1932–1991)

- 1977 appointment as Director of the WRAAC
- Born: 6 October 1932; Rangoon, British Burma
- Died: 17 May 1991 (aged 58); Collaroy, New South Wales, Australia
- Military career
- Allegiance: Australia
- Branch: Women's Royal Australian Army Corps
- Service years: 1952–1979
- Rank: Colonel
- Commands: Women's Royal Australian Army Corps (1977–79)

Colonel Barbara Edweina Audrey Starrett (née Maxwell; 6 October 1932 – 17 May 1991) was an Australian military officer and instructor. She entered the service as a nurse and went on to attend officers' training. Serving as an instructor, she worked her way through the ranks becoming the chief instructor at the Women's Royal Australian Army Corps (WRAAC) School in Georges Heights. Between 1977 and 1979, she served as the fourth and last director of the WRAAC, having the distinction of being the first director who had not served during wartime.

== Early life ==
Barbara Edweina Audrey Maxwell was born on 6 October 1932 in Rangoon, British Burma to the district commissioner. Her childhood was spent traveling to various posts with her family, including Bangalore, Mussoorie and Mysore, in India, before they settled in Perth, Western Australia, in 1946, where she attended Girdlestone School.

== Military career ==
After her graduation, Maxwell began work as a typist in an office, but found the work uninspiring. In 1952, she enlisted in the Royal Australian Army Nursing Corps (RAANC), and was first posted in Melbourne. Sent to Kure, Japan, where she remained for a year, Maxwell served with the British Commonwealth Occupation Force. Returning to Healesville, Maxwell was made a warrant officer and assigned to the School of Army Health. She taught nursing assistants first aid, military law, and organisation for two years and then returned to Perth. Stationed in Karrakatta with the Citizen Military Forces, she taught for two additional years, before being assigned to the Women's Royal Australian Army Corps (WRAAC) School in Georges Heights to take an officer's training course. In the middle of her training, because she could not gain rank without nurse training, she transferred from the nursing service to the regular army.

Graduating with the top academic prize for a cadet in 1960, Maxwell was made a platoon commander of the WRACC School's Recruit Training Wing with the rank of 1st lieutenant. After two years, she was posted in Melbourne as the Quartermaster at the WRAAC Barracks, where she remained until 1964, when she made captain. Her next post found her serving for a year as the only female staff officer of the Royal Military College, Duntroon. Maxwell was assigned to the Russell Offices of the Department of Defence in 1966 and worked as a liaison for families and their welfare. Two years later, she was sent as assistant director of the Anglesea Barracks in Hobart. She traveled throughout Tasmania as a recruiter for the next year.

In 1969, Maxwell returned to Georges Heights, was promoted to major, and was assigned as the senior instructor of the WRAAC School. Over the next several years, she participated in programs liaising with Austcare and the Australian Red Cross and was made chief instructor at the school. She taught seven basic training courses each year. In 1972, Maxwell married Lieutenant Colonel Bruce Starrett and was promoted to lieutenant colonel. With her new rank, she was posted at the Victoria Barracks in Paddington, as assistant director of the WRAAC Headquarters, Eastern Command. She served in Paddington until 1974, when she returned to the WRAAC School as Commanding Officer and the following year, was appointed as Staff Officer in Canberra, serving in the Directorate of Service Conditions.

In 1977, Maxwell became the fourth Director of the WRACC, a full colonel, and the first occupant of the post who had not seen service during wartime. She was honored with the National Medal and clasp in 1978, and retired from active duty the following year. After her retirement, Starrett and her husband engaged in business and remained in the Army Reserves.

== Death and legacy ==
Starrett died suddenly on 17 May 1991 in Collaroy, New South Wales. She is remembered as the last director of the WRACC, as the post was discontinued when she retired.

Military offices
| Preceded by Colonel Kathleen Fowler | Director of the Women's Royal Australian Army Corps; 1977–1979 | Post abolished |
