= Joan McClintock =

Australian social worker (1922–1996)

- Born: Joan Hartley McClintock; 4 February 1922
- Died: 9 September 1996 (aged 74)
- Education: Social Studies at the University of Sydney
- Occupation: Social worker

Joan Hartley McClintock née Roberts AM (4 February 1922 – 9 September 1996) was an Australian social worker and welfare activist who worked for the Australian Women's Army Service during World War II and then had a long career at the Australian Council of Social Service between 1968 and 1983.

== Early life ==
McClintock was born in Mosman, a suburb of Sydney, and was the youngest child of Thomas Victor Roberts and his wife Vera Marguerite (née Perdriau). McClintock's commitment to social justice was cemented at a young age when her father, who worked as an accountant, lost his job during the Great Depression which led to poverty and the loss of her brother Jeffrey in 1937. Jeffrey was deaf and mute and a major contributing factor in his death was his disability; he died while crossing a street and failing to notice a car.

Most of McClintock's schooling took place through Blackfriars, the New South Wales state correspondence school, as he family were living in a house provided by her mothers family in Woodford, in the Blue Mountains (New South Wales). She gained her intermediate certificate in 1938 and then worked as a stenographer and legal secretary.

== The Australian Women's Army Service ==
On 6 February 1942, during World War II, McClintock joined the Australian Women's Army Service and worked first as a driver within the 2nd Ambulance Car Company, between 1942 and 1944, and then in the 8th Advanced Workshop between 1944 and 1945. The Women's Army broadened her understanding of people from different social backgrounds, outside of the middle class life in which she had been raised, which again influenced her later career. She was demobilised on 15 December 1945 with the rank of driver.

== Post war career ==
After the war McClintock completed her leaving certificate and then completed a Diploma of Social Studies at the University of Sydney which she completed in 1949. Also in 1949, on 15 November, she married Roland George McClintock who was studying law; they would go on to have four children together all sons who each ended up working in law.

At the time of her marriage McClintock was not able to apply for paid work, however, she volunteered extensively with a number of organisations including the Marriage Guidance Council, the Legacy Club and the New South Wales Council of Social Service (NCOSS). She would later recal being 'practically put out' of the Australian Association of Social Workers for her objection, when volunteering at NCOSS, to use their centralised system to check claims made by people for emergency relief due to her belief that it implied a moral judgement on those making requests.

In 1968 McClintock started working part-time, in paid employment, as an assistant executive officer with the Australian Council of Social Service (ACOSS) where she would work until 1983 in increasingly senior positions with her final position being of secretary-general from 1981 to 1983. In this role she consistently advocated for low-income and disadvantaged Australians and sought to raise awareness of social policy issues. She saw poverty as a 'lack of access to all those goods, services and information essential to full participation in the community' and not only a simple lack of money.

McClintock retired in 1983, in part due to factional disputes within the organisation, leading to her resignation.

== Later life ==
In retirement McClintock continued to volunteer and, in 1984, was appointed a member of the Order of Australia (AM) for her 'service to the community in the field of social welfare'. In 1989 she completed a bachelor's degree in legal studies at Macquarie University.

McClintock died in Hunters Hill on 9 September 1996.
