= Margaret Joan Spencer =

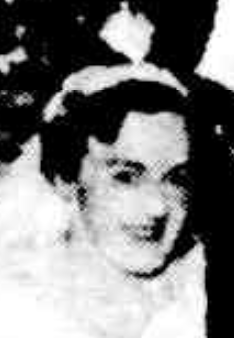
Margaret Joan Spencer, on her wedding day

Lieutenant-Colonel Margaret Joan Spencer OBE (25 August 1912 – 12 May 1990) was an officer in the Australian Women's Army Service during World War II. She was responsible for raising and leading the first contingent of non-nursing and non-medical Australian servicewomen to proceed overseas on active service.

Born Margaret Joan Henry on 25 August 1912 in Tasmania, she attended Hobart Ladies' College, where she proved to be an able sportswoman and a talented student. In 1930, Margaret began studying at the University of Tasmania and would later graduate with a degree of Bachelor of Commerce. In the 1930s, she was awarded a Tasmanian Aero Club scholarship and qualified for her pilot's licence in 1937.

On 14 September 1938, Margaret married Alfred Jack Spencer. In July 1940, he enlisted in the Second Australian Imperial Force and was posted to the 2/4th Anti-Tank Regiment, which was a unit of the 8th Division. He served in the Malayan Campaign and was posted missing after the Battle of Singapore.

Margaret Spencer took on civilian employment early in the war and joined the Women's Air Training Corps. She enlisted in the Australian Women's Army Service in March 1942 and completed an officer commissioning course. In early 1943, she was promoted to temporary major and appointed as Assistant Controller, Tasmanian Lines of Communication Area, making her the senior female officer in Tasmania. She later commanded a training battalion before she was posted to command the AWAS for the First Australian Army in Queensland in 1944. Later that year, after the First Australian Army was transferred to New Guinea, she was selected to command the contingent that would also proceed to New Guinea. She proceeded to New Guinea in May 1945.

Lieutenant-Colonel Spencer was only five feet tall and was fondly nicknamed 'The Little Colonel' by her troops. When the war ended, she was informed that her husband had been killed in action at Bakri, at the start of the Battle of Muar in January 1942. After her discharge, she was appointed an Officer of the Order of the British Empire (OBE) in March 1947 for her war service.

After the war, she completed her university studies and moved to Melbourne, working in several jobs, including as the secretary and later director of administration for the Victorian Society for Crippled Children and Adults, which was established by her wartime commanding officer, Sybil Irving. She died on 12 May 1990.
