= Godfrey Irving =

Australian general

Godfrey George Howy Irving
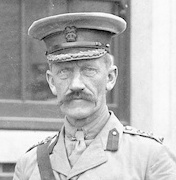
- Born: 25 August 1867; Melbourne, Victoria
- Died: 11 December 1937 (aged 70); Kew, Victoria
- Burial place: Boroondara General Cemetery
- Relatives: Martin Howy Irving (father); Sybil Irving (daughter)
- Military career
- Allegiance: Australia
- Branch: Australian Army
- Service years: 1885–1925
- Rank: Major general
- Commands: 1st Military District (1917–21); 4th Military District (1914–15, 1916–17); 14th Brigade (1916); 15th Brigade (1916); Chief of the General Staff (1915); 5th Military District (1909–14); 6th Battalion, Australian Commonwealth Horse (1902)
- Conflicts: First World War

Major General Godfrey George Howy Irving (25 August 1867 – 11 December 1937) was a senior Australian Army officer during the First World War.

== Early life and career ==
Godfrey George Howy Irving was born on 25 August 1867 at the University of Melbourne, the son of Professor Martin Howy Irving. He was educated at Hawthorn Grammar School.

While still at school, Irving enlisted in the 2nd Battalion, Victorian Rifles in 1885. He was commissioned as a lieutenant in the 2nd Battalion in 1887 and in 1891 joined the Victorian Permanent Forces as a captain. Over the next nine years he was adjutant of the 1st, 2nd, 3rd, 4th and 5th Battalions. In March 1900 he became adjutant of the Victorian Rangers and was promoted to major in July 1900. In March 1902 he was appointed to the Victorian Headquarters staff in Melbourne.

Irving volunteered for service in South Africa and embarked in May 1902 as commander of the 6th Battalion, Australian Commonwealth Horse, with the temporary rank of lieutenant colonel. Irving and his battalion arrived in Natal, but were immediately ordered to return to Australia due to the end of the war. Irving returned to Australia and resumed duty on the Victorian staff. In November 1903, he was transferred to the Army Headquarters staff.

Irving was sent to England and India for training in 1905, returning in early January 1906. In March 1906 he was posted to the Administrative and Instructional Staff in New South Wales. In September 1909 he became commandant of the 5th Military District (Western Australia). He was promoted to temporary colonel in January 1911 and substantive colonel on 1 May 1915. In July 1914, he moved to South Australia to become commandant of the 4th Military District (South Australia).

== First World War ==
On 24 May 1915, Irving was appointed Chief of the General Staff, replacing James Legge who had been appointed general officer commanding the Australian Imperial Force (AIF). His chief responsibility was overseeing the expansion of the training establishment in Australia to provide reinforcements for the AIF units overseas and raising and training what would become the 2nd Division.

By late 1915, the General Staff and the Minister of Defence, Senator George Pearce, had become concerned by the way that the Australian Intermediate Base and the AIF training depot in Egypt were being run. Lacking confidence in the base commander, Colonel Victor Sellheim, Pearce instructed Irving, an officer he regarded as more capable than Sellheim, to take charge of the base in November 1915 as GOC Australian Troops in Egypt.

The evacuation of Gallipoli led to Irving not taking command of the Australian Intermediate Base and the AIF training depot. He was instead given command of the 15th Brigade on 21 February 1916. On 1 March 1916, he was switched to command of the 14th Brigade. He was also acting commander of the 5th Division from 1 March until the arrival of Major General James McCay. On 20 March, the 4th and 5th Divisions were ordered to move from their training area at Tel el Kebir to the Suez Canal, where they would replace the 1st and 2nd Divisions, which had recently left for France.

Irving returned to Australia in June and once again became commandant of the 4th Military District. In February 1917, he became commandant of the 1st Military District (Queensland).

== Post war ==
In May 1921 he was appointed deputy quartermaster general at Army Headquarters in Melbourne. He was placed on the unattached list in 1922 and made a major general on retirement in November 1925.

Irving died in Melbourne on 11 December 1937 and was buried in Boroondara Cemetery.

His son Ronald Godfrey Howy Irving graduated from Royal Military College, Duntroon in 1919 and reached the rank of brigadier. His daughters both had notable careers with Sybil Howy Irving, being the founder and controller of the Australian Women's Army Service during the Second World War and his youngest daughter Freda Irving being was a journalist who also served with the Australian Women's Land Army.

Military offices
Preceded by Major General James Gordon Legge	Chief of the General Staff; May – December 1915	Succeeded by Colonel Hubert Foster
