= Bibra Lake AWAS Camp =

Australian Women's Army Service camp

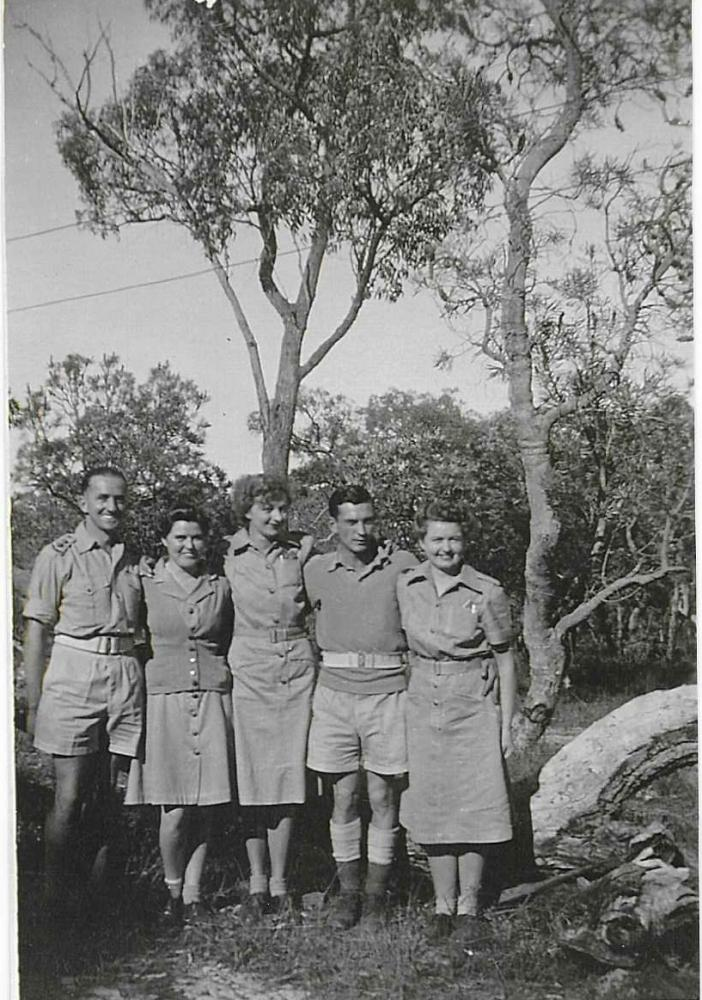
Members of the Australian Women's Army Service (AWAS) at Bibra Lake Searchlight Station camp.

The Bibra Lake Australian Women's Army Service (AWAS) camp was a collection of pre-fab army huts built in the vicinity of Bibra Lake in Cockburn. The camp was probably constructed in 1943, and the women posted there were part of the 66 Anti-aircraft (AA) searchlight (SL) battery. The camp was located near Hope Road, which runs between Bibra and North Lakes. Though dismantled immediately after the war, some remains can still be seen in the area.

== History ==
As the war progressed and Japan began to threaten the Pacific region, the men of Australia's armed forces were required for overseas duty. Until 1941 enlisted men had been responsible for Australia's home defence, from signals to anti-aircraft batteries, but as the war came to New Guinea they were needed at the front. Australian women were encouraged to enlist in the AWAS to free up men for fighting service. Over 20,000 women were enlisted in the AWAS over the course of the war, trained to take over all the roles their male counterparts had been performing.

In 1942, Australian troops returning home from the Middle East were formed into the 116 Light Anti-Aircraft regiment (LAA). The headquarters of this regiment were initially located at Naval Base, then at Bibra Lake.

The AWAS camp was attached to 66 Searchlight Battery, known as Searchlight Station 10, which also had stations at Swanbourne, Como, Mosman Park and Kings Park. Other stations in the area were located at North Jandakot and Naval Base.

Many women were posted to positions far away from their home cities, often to remote areas. Others were local, completing their training and being assigned to posts in their home towns. The Bibra Lake battery housed a mixture of Tasmanian and Western Australian women.

== Camp at Bibra Lake ==
Pre-fab huts were built at Bibra Lake for the AWAS quarters. The women's duties were varied, ranging from cutting firewood and cooking for the camp to cleaning guns and searchlights. Many of them were from other states and had only lived in towns, and were unused to living in a semi-rural location. They were troubled by dugites, and reported never seeing Bibra Lake itself which was probably because the whole area was bushland with only a dirt-track service road.

The camp consisted of a combined kitchen, mess and recreation room with a lean-to at the back, concrete-floored latrines and ablutions blocks, an engine shed, and an underground command post, all surrounded by barbed wire.

Women at the camp were given milk by local dairy farmers, and in return gave them kitchen scraps to feed their poultry. The searchlights were clearly visible at night, when they were often used to spot small planes flying over the area.

Searchlight women were trained in spotting, sound locating, command duties and computing, and as more men were sent overseas, increasingly in firearms and defence.

== Bushfires ==
The base was threatened by a bushfire in the summer, and the women were ordered to evacuate. They packed their bags and stacked them beside the road before returning to fight the fire alongside male soldiers, clearing fire breaks and putting out small fires with wet sacks and branches. They treated a local Chinese market gardener for burns and exhaustion and gave him some new clothes, as his had been burnt to rags when his garden was destroyed.

== Photographs ==
The daughter of Private Margaret May Robertson (Royal Aust Corps Signal) discovered photographs from her mother's time at Bibra Lake.

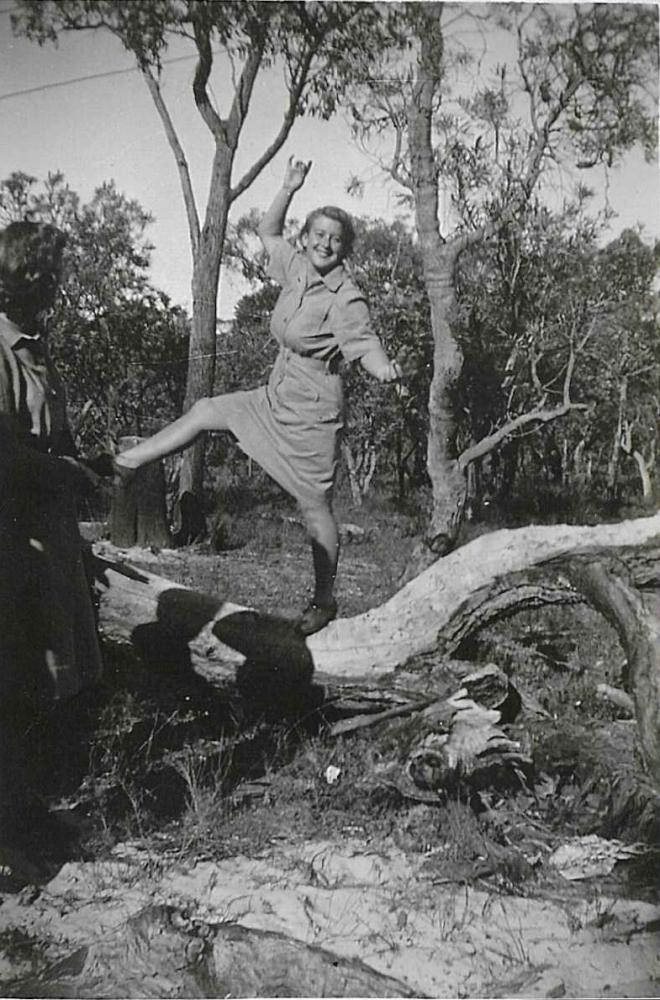
Exploring Bibra Lake

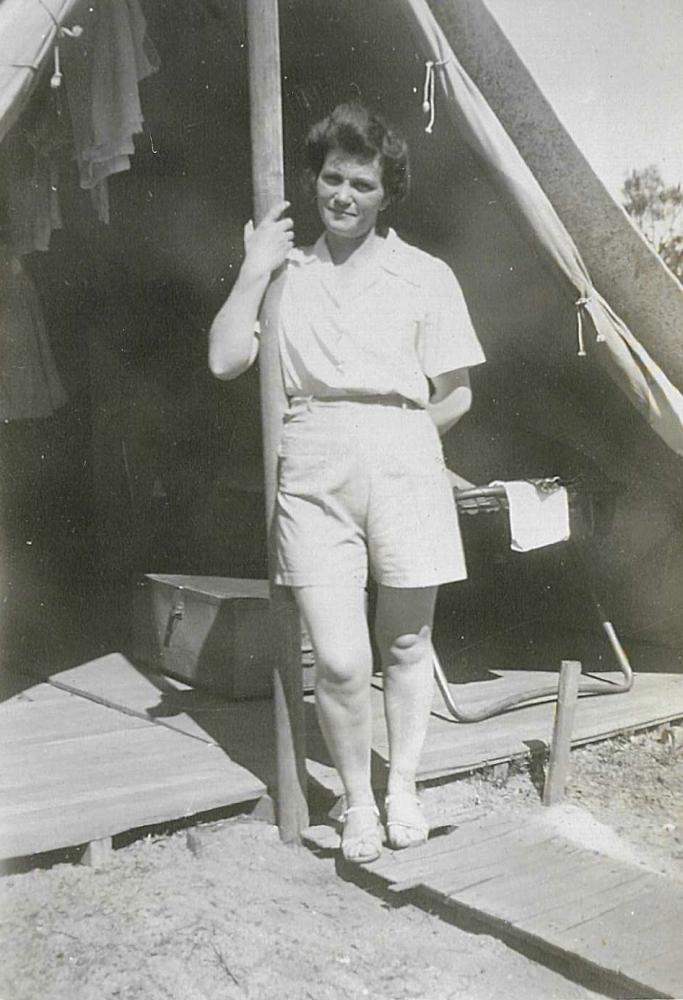
Tents at Bibra Lake

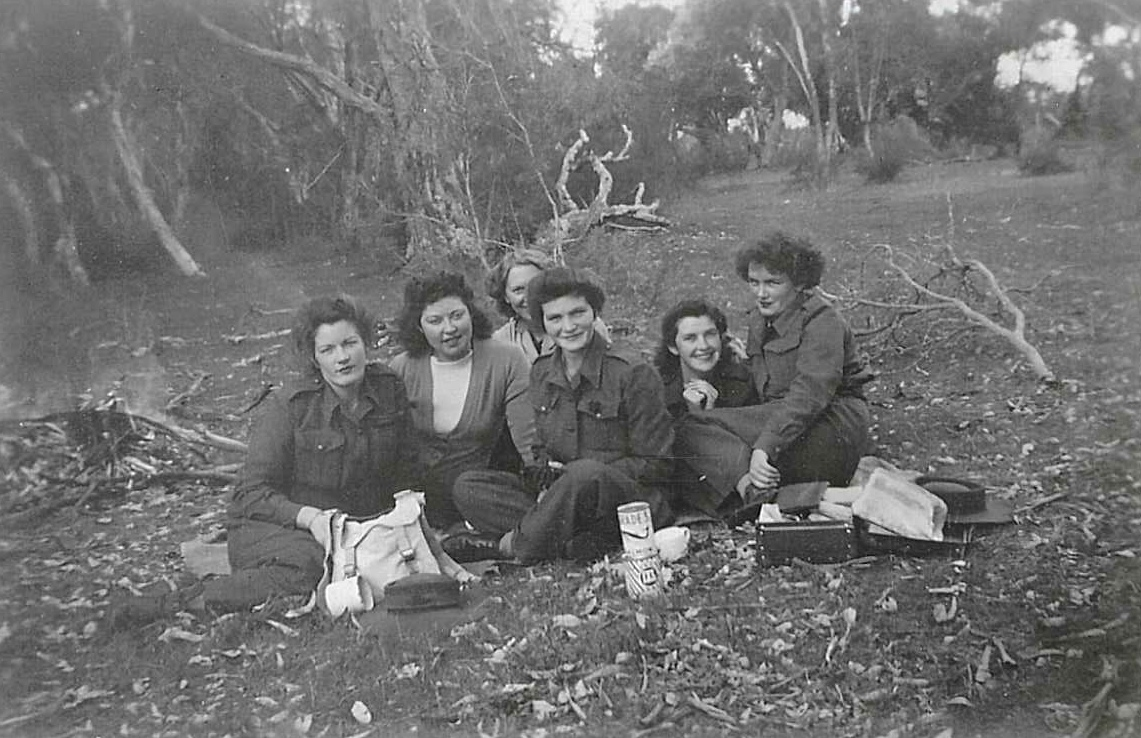
AWAS picnic at Bibra Lake

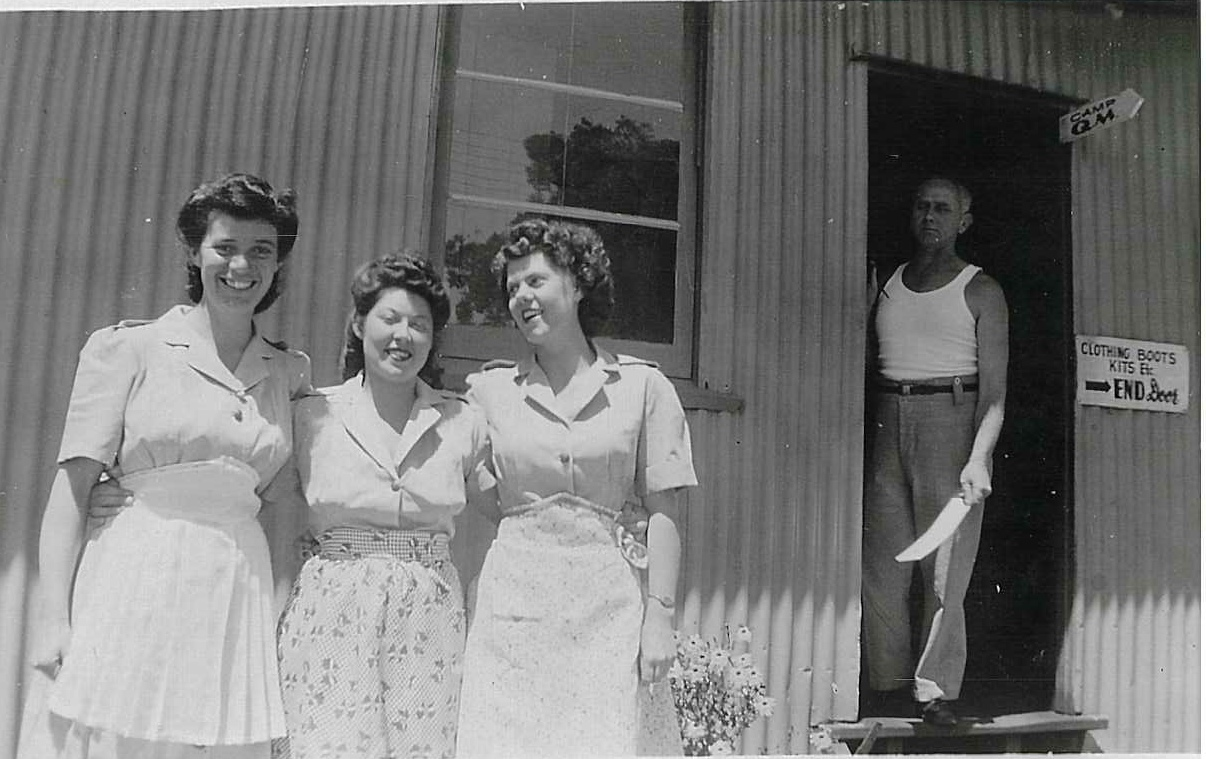
Quartermaster's hut, Bibra Lake

== Dismantling ==
In October 1945, auctions were held in Perth for the dismantled searchlight stations, including Searchlight Station 10 at Bibra Lake. Detailed accounts of the materials used in their construction were included in the auction listings, as building materials were in short supply after the war.

== Current issues ==
The remains of the camp are currently under threat from the proposed Roe 8 Highway Extension through the Cockburn district. The City of Cockburn has engaged a heritage specialist to undertake a survey of the site and will act on the recommendations when they are presented.
