= Pat Riggs =

Australian journalist, editor and councillor (1921–1998)

Pat Riggs or Shirley Patricia Riggs (21 February 1921 – 12 March 1998) was an Australian woman who worked as a newspaper editor for The Macleay Argus and shire councillor for the Kempsey Shire Council.

During World War II she served with the Australian Women's Army Service serving, in part, as an officer and program manager for the Australian Broadcasting Control Unit producing propaganda.

== Early life ==
Riggs was born in Neutral Bay, a suburb of Sydney, and was the younger of twins born to Lawrence Henry Cooper Riggs, who was born in New Zealand, and his Australian wife Gladys Edith Riggs (née Phelps). In Sydney her father worked as a railway department clerk and, in 1933, for his work they moved to Bathurst and then to Kempsey around 1937 where he managed the railway refreshment rooms at the stations there. Riggs attended high school at both of these locations and was a strong swimmer and competed in many state championships'. At the age of 16 she saved a man from drowning and was recognised for her heroism.

After completing high school Riggs attended business college in Sydney and, upon its completion, returned to Kempsey where she worked as a secretary at the local community radio station 2KM for the next two years.

In 1941 Riggs returned to Sydney where she worked for a short time within the publicity department of the Sydney offices of United Artists. This ended when, on 26 January 1942 she enlisted in the Australian Women's Army Service; this decision came soon after the Japanese entered World War II. For an unknown reason, as she was eligible despite the change, Riggs changed her date of birth when she enlisted to 21 February 1920; this was one year older than she was.

== Australian Women's Army Service ==
In the Australian Women's Army Service Riggs first performed administrative training and regimental duties and worked across Victoria, New South Wales, Queensland and South Australia. She was promoted to acting corporal in March 1942 and, from around this time, began editing the Weekly Whine (a weekly publication) and Off Parade (a monthly publication). Both of these were publications for servicewomen.

In February 1943 she was promoted again to acting warrant officer, class two, and in June was commissioned as a lieutenant.

From October 1944 to January 1946 Riggs was the program manager (also listed as second-in-charge) for the 1st Australian Broadcasting Control Unit, which was based in Sydney. This was a propaganda unit and she was in charge of the women's section and, in this role, she wrote, edited and cast many dramatic plays and acted and narrated a number of them. Here she gained a reputation as a good media performer.

On 8 April 1946 she was demobilised from the AWAS.

== Post war and work with the Macleay Argus ==
After being demobilised Riggs moved to Perth, in Western Australia, where she worked at a radio station and she returned to Kempsey briefly in 1949 before setting off on a working holiday around Europe. She returned to Australia in 1953 where she helped run the newsagency her father had started in Bowraville until he sold the business and she took on local factory work.

In 1956, now 35, she began working for Kempsey's local newspaper The Macleay Argus as a cadet. Here she believed herself to be the oldest cadet on record. Despite this she soon proved herself and within five years was the 'associate editor' who was, for all intents and purposes the editor without the title. Riggs said this was due to them being "terrified of women being responsible for anything". It was not until 1978 she became the official editor.

In 1969 Riggs was responsible for perhaps the most successful April Fools' Day joke when, at the height of the Cold War, she published a front-page story about the arrival of ten ships from the Russian Merchant Fleet arriving at Trial Bay, near Arakoon, which was run with a doctored photograph which included recognisable ships like the Titanic and the HMS Bounty. Throughout the article Riggs also included the phrase 'April fool’ spelled backwards in a number of places. Tricked many locals travelled to Trial Bay to deliver aid only to realise the deceit; this led to many demanding reimbursement from the newspaper and news of the confusion made news around the world.

While at the Argus Riggs won Walkley Awards for provincial journalism in 1965 and 1966 (she was then the first woman to have won two Walkey's), Prodi Awards in 1968 and 1970 and a Rural Press Award in 1980. This was, in part, for her advocacy for rural journalism and her belief in the importance of a strong rural press which was not only relevant to local readers but also in keeping metropolitan newspaper honest and accountable of their reporting of the goings on in regional locations.

Because of these awards Riggs was also frequently offered roles at larger newspapers in cities but always turned them down believing that, if she was to be moved, she would be forced to work on women's pages or on social notes.

She retired in 1981 and, that same year, she was made Kempsey Citizen of the Year.

== Later life ==
After her retirement Riggs moved to Crescent Head where, between 1983 and 1991 she served on the Kempsey Shire Council. Additionally, despite her official retirement, she continued to write a weekly column for the Macleay Argus which continued into the 1990s.

She died on 12 March 1998 and, in recognition of her 1969 joke her obituary was published on April Fool's Day in 1998.

== Legacy ==
The Pat Riggs Cadet of the Year Award for the New South Wales north coast region is named for Riggs.
