= Dawn Jackson =

Australian Army officer

- Born: 22 February 1917; Kent, England
- Died: 20 January 1995 (aged 77); Canberra, Australia
- Relatives: Robert Jackson (father); Oliver David Jackson (brother)
- Military career
- Allegiance: Australia
- Branch: Second Australian Imperial Force; Women's Royal Australian Army Corps
- Service years: 1941–1947 c. 1951–1972
- Rank: Colonel
- Commands: Women's Royal Australian Army Corps (1957–72)
- Conflicts: Second World War
- Awards: Officer of the Order of the British Empire

Colonel Dawn Valerie Vautin Jackson, OBE (22 February 1917 – 20 January 1995) was an Australian military officer. She served as director of the Women's Royal Australian Army Corps from 1957 to 1972, and is credited with a policy change allowing Australian servicewomen to serve overseas for the first time.

Jackson was born in Kent, England, and was educated at St Catherine's School, Sydney, Australia.

Jackson was appointed an Officer of the Order of the British Empire in 1960.

Military offices
Preceded by Colonel Kathleen Best	Director of the Women's Royal Australian Army Corps; 1957–1972	Succeeded by Colonel Kathleen Fowler
