= Ethel Byrne (pathologist) =

(1895–1957) Australian physician and pathologist

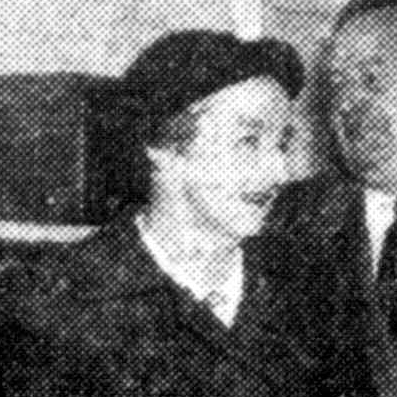
- 1951
- Born: 28 August 1895; Cookardinia, New South Wales, Australia
- Died: 5 November 1957 (aged 62); Royal Newcastle Hospital, Newcastle, New South Wales, Australia
- Education: University of Sydney

Ethel Byrne (28 August 1895 – 5 November 1957) was an Australian physician and pathologist.

== Life ==
Byrne was born in Cookardinia in New South Wales. She was the ninth of ten children and her younger sister, Lorna Byrne, became an army major and a radio broadcaster.

Her parents were Margaret (born Crennan) and James Byrne; they were both born in New South Wales. Her father was a teacher. Byrne went to West Maitland Girls' High School before going on to study at the University of Sydney.

She was employed at Newcastle Hospital in 1919 during the flu pandemic. She was appointed as a "junior" but was Newcastle's only medical officer during the pandemic, and in the following year, there was an outbreak of tuberculosis. She stayed at the hospital until 1928 when she left, but she continued as a consultant.

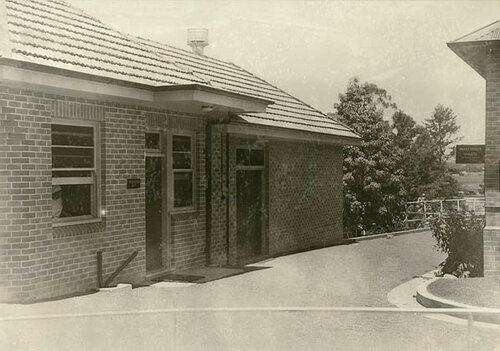
Pathology department at Maitland hospital c 1940 where Ethel Byrne also worked

She resigned as a pathologist from Newcastle Hospital in 1946 and she became its tuberculosis officer in 1947 when the chest unit was opened in Rankin Park. Byrne House was a new building for the recuperation of male tuberculosis patients. In 1951 she recounted that very ill patients were on the ground floor until they recovered. The provisions of adequate pensions meant that her patients had less to worry about.

Byrne never married and she died in Newcastle's hospital on 5 November 1957 intestate.
