= Maude Kathleen Deasey =

(1909-1968) teacher, army officer and administrator

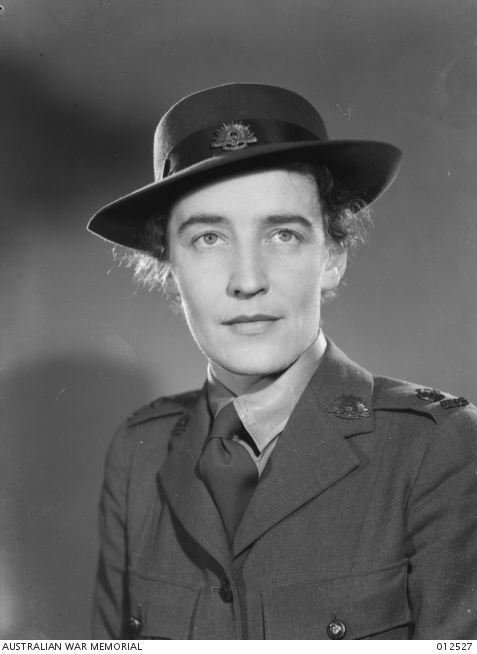
Portrait of V345001 Major Kathleen Deasey, c1941

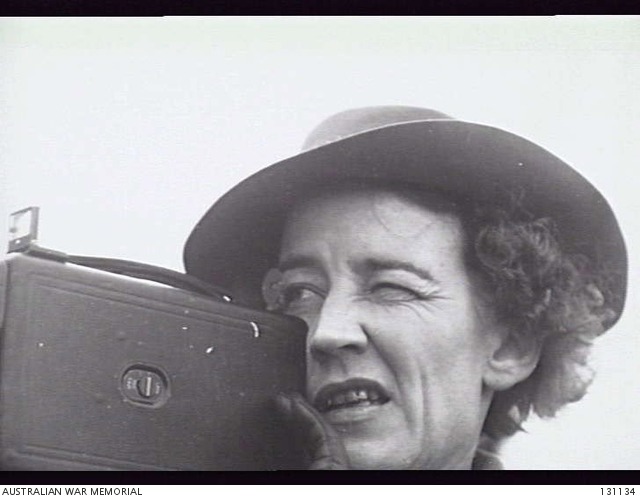
V345001 Major Maude Kathleen 'Kath' Deasey, 1942

Maude Kathleen Deasey (26 May 1909 – 6 September 1968) was an Australian woman who worked as a teacher and then, during World War II, as a senior officer within the Australian Women's Army Service. In 1943 she was seconded to the Royal Australian Army Chaplains' Department and, in 1946, was a part of the Australian Victory Contingent to London.

== Early life ==
Deasey was born in Collingwood, a suburb of Melbourne, where she was the second of six children born to the Reverend Denis Murrell Deasey and his wife Maude Williamson (née Watt). Her father was an Anglican clergyman and she attended school at the Geelong Church of England Girls' Grammar School.

After completing her schooling Deasey attended the University of Melbourne where she completed a bachelor of arts (1931), a master of arts (1933) and a diploma of education (1935). After completing these studies in Australia Deasey then travelled to the United Kingdom where she studied at Newnham College, Cambridge where she studied theology and graduated in Tripos in 1937.

During this period Deasey also travelled throughout Europe with the National Union of Students and also to the conference of the International Federation of University Women in Poland in 1936.

When Deasey returned to Australia she worked first as a teacher at Frensham School in Mittagong until, in 1940, she became the 'lady superintendent' at the Methodist Ladies' College, Melbourne.

== Australian Women's Army Service ==
When the Australian Women's Army Service formed in August 1941 Deasey was once of the first women to join and was recruited to be one of its officers. She was appointed the assistant-controller of the Southern Command by November 1941 and soon after, on 28 January 1947, was promoted to major. In her role she was responsible for establishing the services structure in Victoria and, in 1942 alone, was responsible for enlisting and training more than 5,000 new recruits. One of the other officers she worked closely with was Isla Victoria Murphy.

In May 1943 she was transferred to the First Army headquarters in Toowoomba in Queensland (again as the assistant-controller) before, in October 1943, she was moved back to Melbourne where she was seconded by the Royal Australian Army Chaplains' Department. In this role she acted as an advisor to the chaplains-general, particularly in regards to ensuring that the 30,000 women in Army service, including the Australian Army Nursing Service and the Australian Army Medical Women's Service, were able to maintain contact with their churches. The role also involved extensive travel throughout Australia and the South-West Pacific.

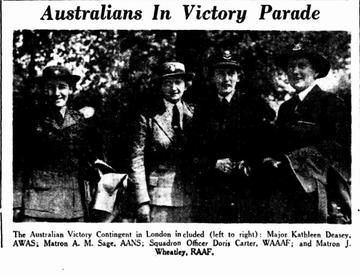
The Australian Victory Contingent in London, June 1946 (Deasey pictured on the left)

While with the Chaplains Department Deasey also published a booklet Readings and Prayers for Members of Army Women's Services (1944) which was widely distributed. This booklet included a foreword by Princess Alice, Duchess of Gloucester.

In 1946, Deasey represented the Women's Army Service at the Victory march in London as a part of the Australian Victory Contingent.

She transferred to the reserves on 25 January 1947.

== Post war career ==
After the war Deasey worked with the Australian Department of Immigration to help place migrant families. From 1950 to 1952 she returned to Europe where she travelled extensively and studied the French language for a year at the Sorbonne in Paris.

Back in Australia she administered a sponsorship scheme for the World Council of Churches which was aimed at assisting immigrants from Europe who had no friends or relatives in Australia to help them by finding them sponsorship.

From 1958 to 1959 she travelled to the United States where, using a Ford Foundation grant, she was a teaching fellow in the faculty of education at New York University.

In the 1960s, back in Australia again, she held a number of roles including as a tutor at the University of Melbourne, principal of St Ann's College at the University of Adelaide and a teacher at Larnook Domestic Arts Teachers' College.

== Later life ==
Deasey died on 6 September 1968 at Prahran in Melbourne.

== Collections ==
A collection of Deasey's biographical cuttings, which she collected, are available at the National Library of Australia.
