= The Macleay Argus =

The Macleay Argus is an English-language newspaper published twice a week, on Tuesday and Friday, in Kempsey, New South Wales, Australia. In 1952 it absorbed The Macleay Chronicle, which had been in publication since 1878.

== History ==
The Macleay Argus commenced publication in 1885. Its circulation included the Hastings, Manning, Camden Haven, Rollands Plains, Upper Macleay and the Northern Coast districts.

The Macleay Chronicle was published in Kempsey from 1878 to 1952. In 1892 it circulated to 1500 people in the district. From 1910 it was published by Edward Patrick Noonan, whose son Harry also worked for the paper. After Edward's death, the Chronicle was run by his three daughters Ethel Margaret, Dorothy and Vivienne until 1952. The paper was then absorbed by the Macleay Argus.

One of its notable former employees and future editor was Pat Riggs who started working there as a cadet in 1956, age 35, and within five years was the associate editor (with all the responsibilities of editor) and formal editor from 1978; during her time there she received many awards an commendations. While at the paper she was infamous for publishing an April Fools' Day joke in 1969 about the arrival of ten ships from the Russian Merchant Fleet arriving at Trial Bay, near Arakoon, which caused significant confusion locally and led to the incident being reported internationally. Riggs had seemingly intended for the joke to be an obvious one as she included a doctored photograph including recognisable ships like Titanic and HMS Bounty and, additionally, throughout the article included the phrase 'April fool' spelt backwards in several locations.

== Digitisation ==
Both The Macleay Argus and The Macleay Chronicle have been digitised as part of the Australian Newspapers Digitisation Program of the National Library of Australia.

== See also ==
- List of newspapers in Australia
- List of newspapers in New South Wales
