= Cookardinia =

- Town
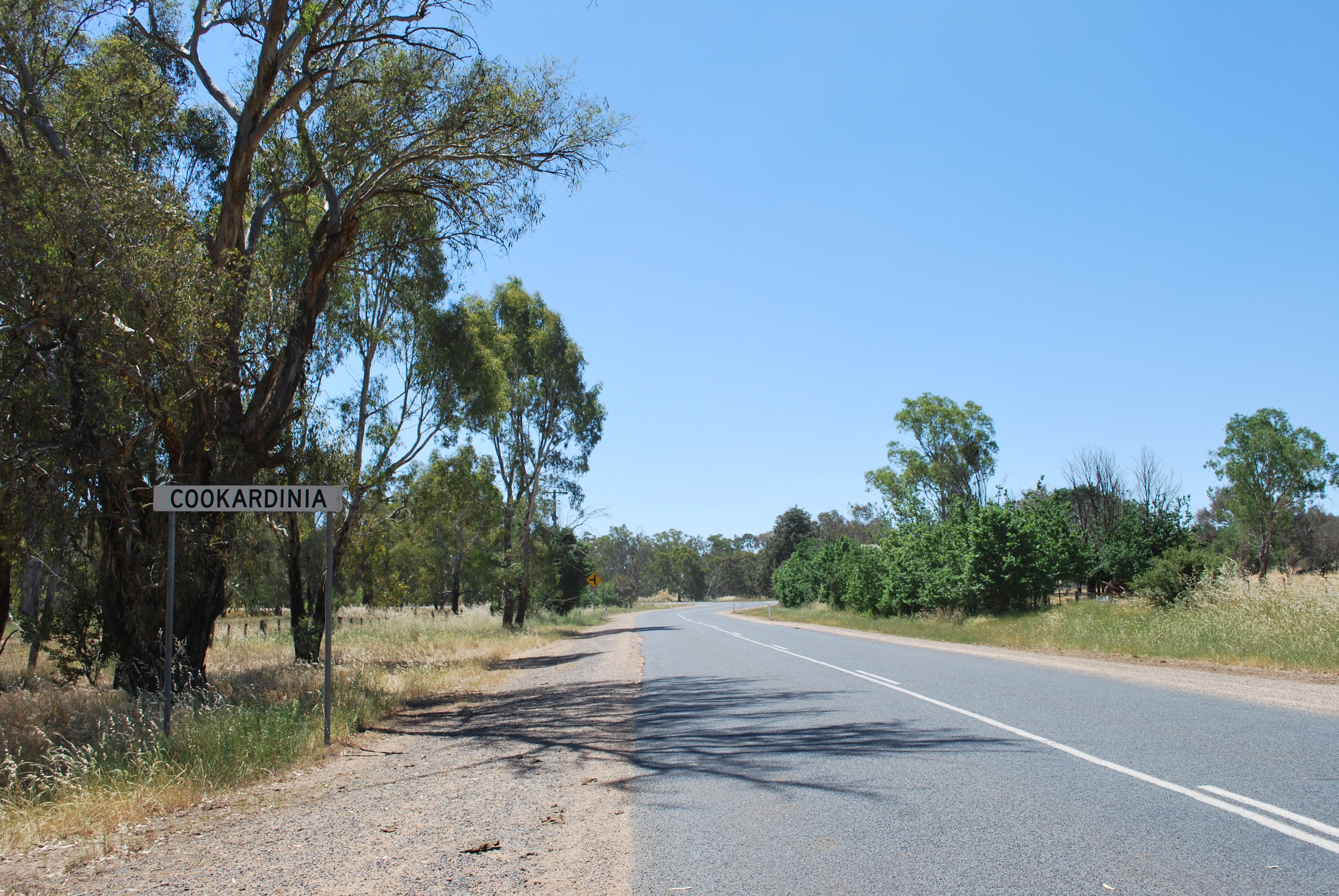
- Entering Cookardinia

- Coordinates: 35°34′0″S 147°13′0″E
- Country: Australia
- State: New South Wales
- LGA: Greater Hume Shire Council
- Location: 503 km (313 mi) from Sydney; 57 km (35 mi) from Wagga Wagga; 27 km (17 mi) from Holbrook; 24 km (15 mi) from Henty

Government
  - State electorate: Albury
  - Federal division: Farrer

Population
  - Total: 283 (2001 census)
- Postcode: 2650
- County: Goulburn

Cookardinia is a rural locality in the Riverina region of New South Wales, Australia. The locality is 57 kilometres (35 mi) south of the regional city of Wagga Wagga and 24 kilometres (15 mi) east of the town of Henty. Its surrounding area has a population of some 283.

The place name 'Cookardinia' is derived from the local Aboriginal word meaning "the place of the giant kingfisher", probably a reference to the Kookaburra and hence the phonetic similarity.

Only several buildings remain, including the old 'Buckaringa' woolshed on the Cookardinia-Henty Road and the Memorial Hall built in 1925.

On the intersection of the Henty, Culcairn and Holbrook roads can be seen the (rapidly deteriorating) ruins of the Squatter's Arms Inn which was built in 1848. The Squatter's Arms Inn closed its doors to official trading in 1925 but then was briefly restored internally when it featured in the 1976 filming of Mad Dog Morgan, starring Dennis Hopper.

== History ==
=== Pastoral runs ===
In 1843 Robert Burke occupied the ‘Buckaginga’ pastoral run in the Murrumbidgee Pastoral District. At the time he was "the first settler in that part of the country, there being no other person occupying land within a circuit of 100 miles". Six months later John Post, an ex-convict, took up the ‘Cookardinia’ run, adjoining ‘Buckaginga’ to the south. In 1847 the ‘Buckaginga’ license was sold to John Morrice. Later Morrice sold ‘Buckaginga’ to Osborne who ran the property as a sheep station.

John Post lived on the ‘Cookardinia’ run with his wife and children. The property was used to raise fat cattle and for running a dairy. From January 1852 a lease "for Pastoral purposes only" was granted to John Post and John Keane for the ‘Cookardinia’ run. John Post's wife Bridget died in September 1863.

=== Squatters' Arms Hotel ===
As the district developed and nearby towns were established the ‘Cookardinia’ run happened to be located on the main road between Albury and Wagga Wagga, near the junction of branch roads to Henty and Culcairn. John Post took advantage of the position by building a roadside inn to provide accommodation and other amenities for travellers.

From the early 1860s the hotel at ‘Cookardinia’ was managed by Elizabeth Stamp. The inn was often referred to as "Mrs. Stamp’s hotel".

In June 1863 the bushranger Dan Morgan and another man held up four young men "at Mr. Post’s station, Cookendina, near Albury". The young men "were proceeding from Ten-mile Creek to attend some bye-races at Merritt’s Cookendina Inn". They were robbed of three race-horses together with saddles and bridles.

In June 1866 the Crown Prosecutor, David Forbes, and Judge Francis of the District Court, spent an uncomfortable night at the inn at Cookardinia on their way from Wagga Wagga to Albury. The two men were subjected to flea bites and "a sad deficiency of bed-clothes" during the night. As a result of the experience Edward Post (John Post's eldest son) was summoned to appear before the Albury Police Court and charged under the Publicans' Act with "not having proper accommodation" in the form of "two proper and well-supplied bedrooms" on the occasion of the visit by the "learned gentlemen". Post was fined 40 shillings and costs.

In 1868 a publican's license was granted to Elizabeth Stamp for the Squatters’ Arms Hotel at Cookardinia. In 1869 John Post himself became the licensee of the hotel.

== Notable people ==
Ethel Byrne, pathologist, was born here in 1895.

=== Cookardinia village ===
Cookardinia Post Office opened on 1 December 1873 and closed in 1976. With two interruptions, there was a school at Cookardinia, between 1877 and 1954.

In late 1888 a new bridge was erected over the Cookardinia Creek near Cookardinia at the site of the old bridge. The construction was described as "a substantial one" which "will secure the safety of heavy traffic crossing".

== Cookardinia Football Club ==
The Cookardinia Football Club was established in 1897 and played its first game against Germanton (Holbrook). In 1955, the club merged with the Mangoplah Football Club.

== Gallery ==
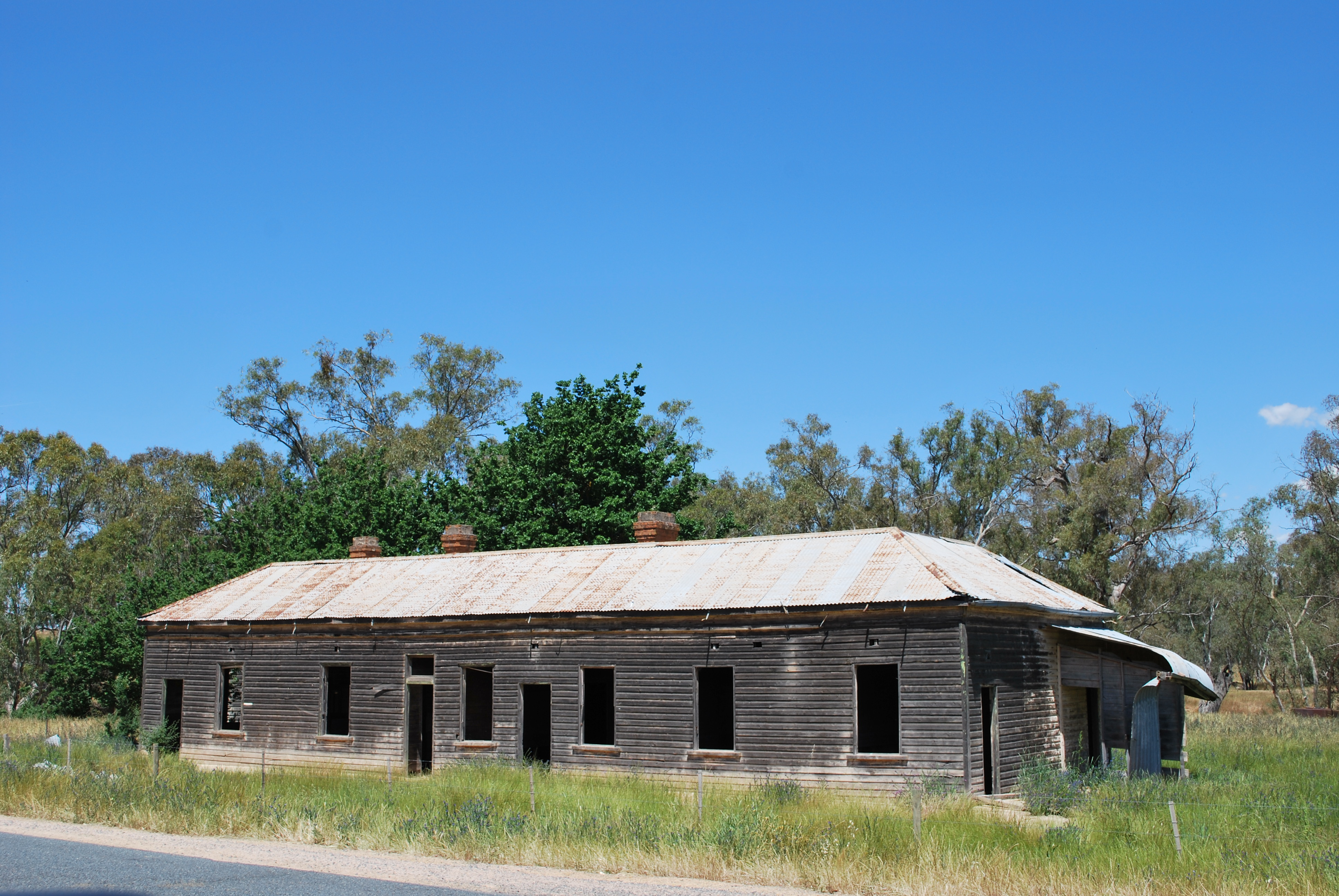
Squatter's Arms Inn

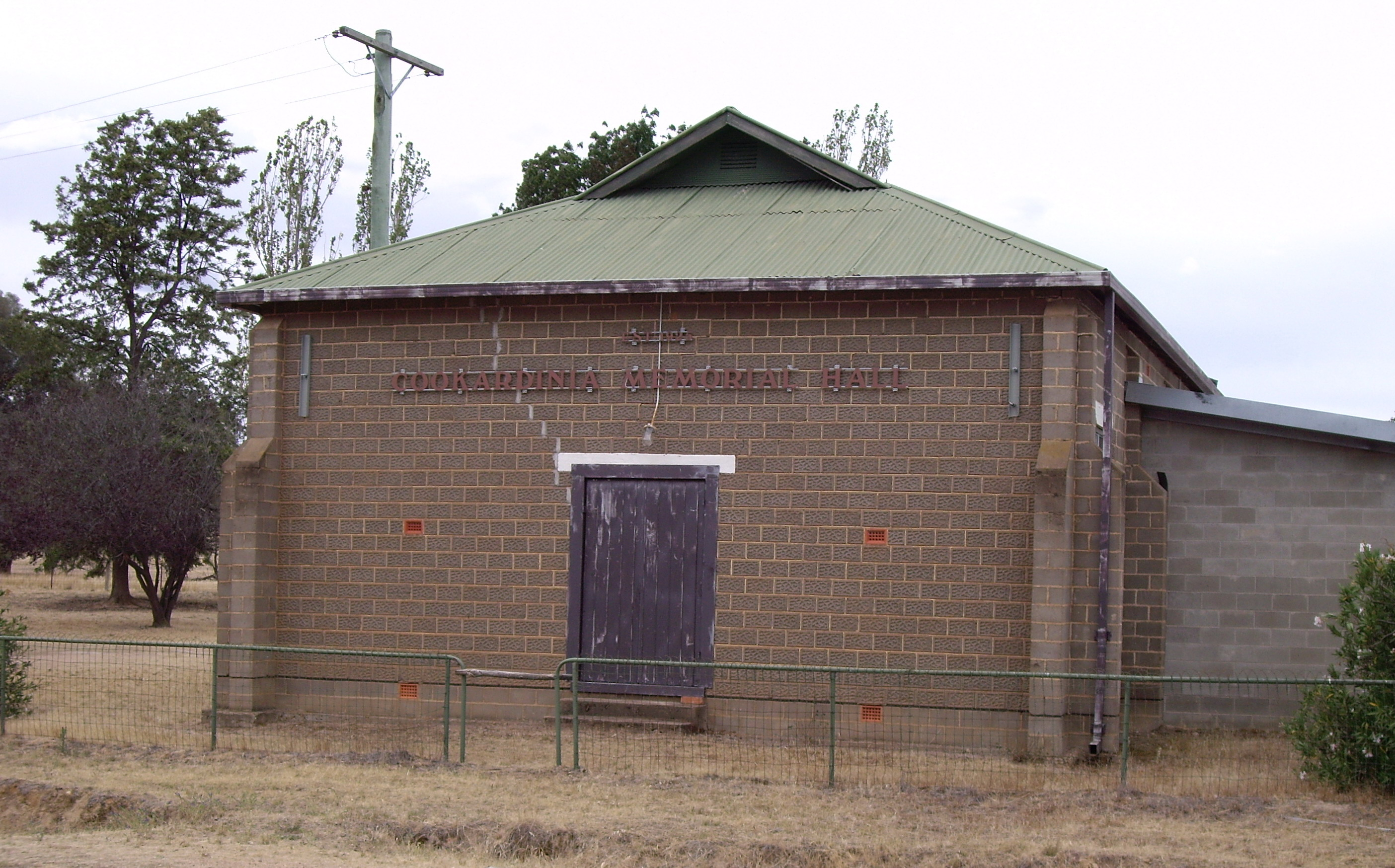
Memorial hall

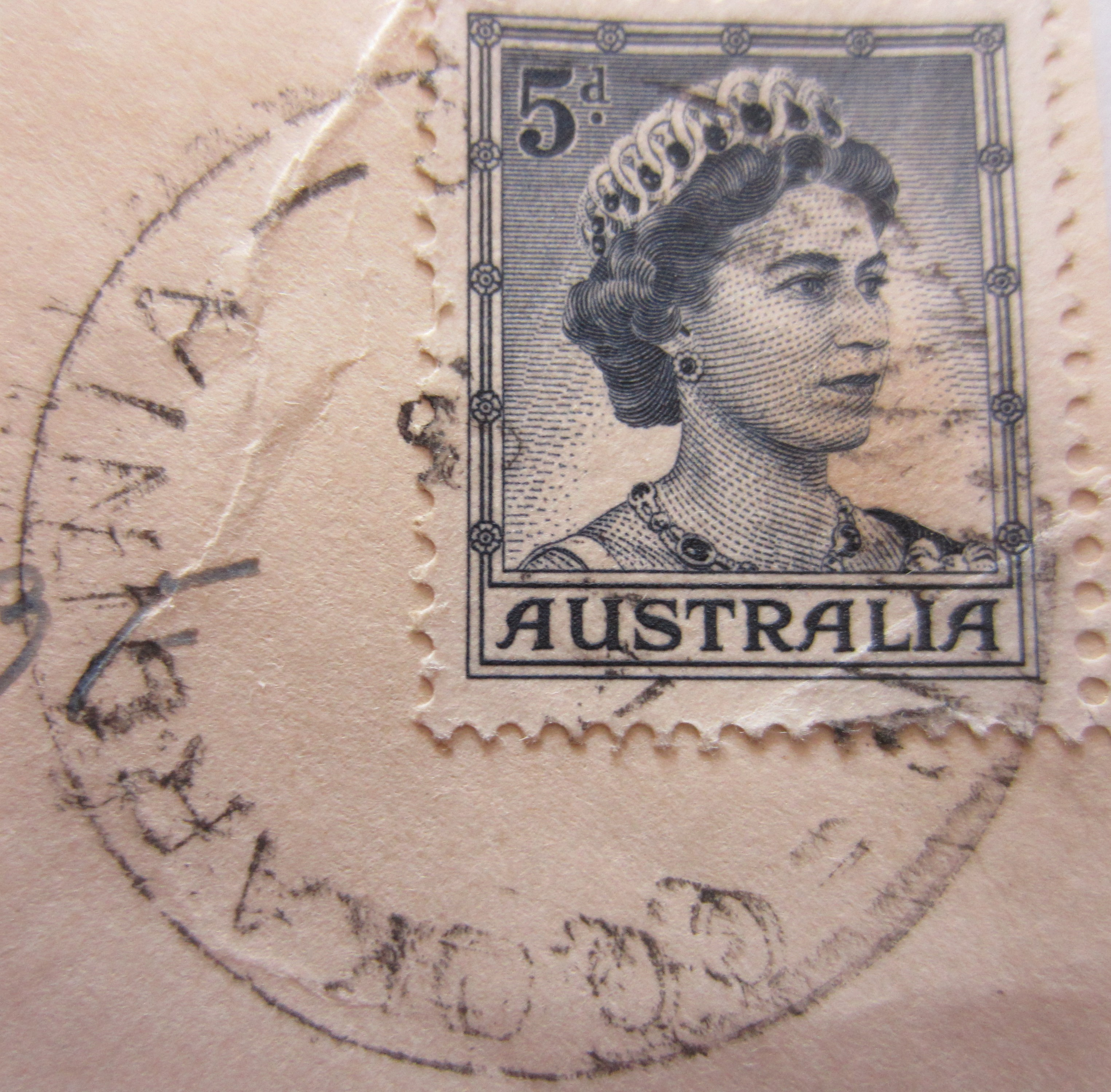
Postmark
