= Betty Olive Osborn =

Australian journalist and local historian (1935–2020)

Betty Olive Osborn née Roberts (1934 – 10 December 2020) was an Australian journalist from Melbourne and historian who was known as the 'girl reporter' of The Argus newspaper in the 1950s and went on the publish numerous books about local history in both Bacchus Marsh and Maryborough.

== Career ==
In 1951, when still at high school, Osborn visited The Argus offices in Melbourne to enquire about starting a career in journalism and was advised to complete her studies and to continue working on her typing and short-hand skills. Osborn did so and by the following year was working at the offices as a secretary for the Weekend Magazine and began working on articles for them.

While employed as a secretary she published a report about those living at the Dudley Flats, which housed a large homeless population and how, to survive they often scavenged from the tip. In this article she took her own photographs using her mother's box brownie camera.

Osborn was later discouraged from becoming a journalist and enrolled in a bachelor of laws at the University of Melbourne but soon accepted a cadetship on the social pages with The Argus and instead remained at the university as a part-time arts student. As a cadet Osborn was expected to 'dress the part' and wear a hat, gloves and appropriate evening wear when attending events. During this period she worked under Gladys Hain, the editor, and Freda Irving who took her under her wing.

In 1955 Osborne won the Montague Grover Prize for cadet journalists offered by the Australian Journalists’ Association and she was the third woman to in this prize. After the completion of her cadetship, she was transferred to the general staff.

Starting from 1956 Osborn was appointed as a gallery reporter at the Victorian Legislative Assembly and Osborn later remembered that:

There was not one woman in the Victorian Legislative Assembly that year and the only woman I recall coming into the press gallery was Rose Kinson from the Sun

— Betty Osborn, via The Australian Women's Register

Later in 1956 Osborn also covered the 1956 Melbourne Olympics and spent a lot of time at the Olympic Village but, just six weeks after the end of the games The Argus closed. Osborne then briefly worked as a journalist for The Sun News-Pictorial but soon returned to university full-time.

Osborn later married Bruce Osborn and they moved together the Bacchus Marsh where they had four children together; Robyn, Diana, Cathy and Philip. While there she became devoted to local history and published: A History of Holy Trinity, Bacchus Marsh (1971) and The Bacchus Story: A History of Captain W.H. Bacchus and his Son (1973).

In 1973 the family moved to Maryborough, Queensland where she began work again as a journalist as edited the Wimmera-Mallee edition of the Country Bulletin and worked as a columnist for the Maryborough Advertiser. She was also a member of the local historical society and, alongside Treanear DuBourg, published Maryborough: A Social History 1854-1904 (1985) which she followed up with its sequel Against the Odds: Maryborough 1905-1961 (1995).

Osborn died 10 December 2020.
