= Women's Royal Australian Army Corps =

- Active: 1951–84
- Country: Australia
- Role: Service support
- March: Soldiers of the Queen

Commanders
- Colonel-In-Chief: Princess Margaret, Countess of Snowdon

Insignia
- Abbreviation: WRAAC

The Women's Royal Australian Army Corps (WRAAC) was formed as an all women's corps of the Australian Army in April 1951. Its Colonel-in-Chief was Princess Margaret, Countess of Snowdon. The purpose of the corps was to counter a personnel shortage that developed due to fighting during the Korean War and post-World War II full employment. At the time of its formation, many senior WRAAC personnel had previously served in the Australian Women's Army Service (AWAS), which had been raised during World War II, and as a result the WRAAC is considered to have its origins in the AWAS. The corps consisted of both Regular and part-time personnel, and had commissioned officers, warrant officers, non commissioned officers and other ranks who filled a variety of roles including general duties, cooking, clerical work, instruction, warehousing, and signalling. There were also librarians, coders, projectionists, and psychologists.

Training was completed separately from male recruits at various locations including Queenscliff for soldiers and Georges Heights for officers. Personnel were posted either to formed WRAAC companies, or to male units to fill position vacancies. By the late 1970s female soldiers had begun to be integrated into the Army at large and in late 1984, the WRAAC was disbanded with personnel being transferred to other previously all male corps based on their trade specialty. At this time, female officer cadets began training at the Officer Cadet School, Portsea alongside male cadets, and when Portsea closed down at the end of 1985, they were integrated into the Royal Military College, Duntroon. Female soldiers began training alongside male recruits at the Army Recruit Training Centre at Kapooka in 1985.

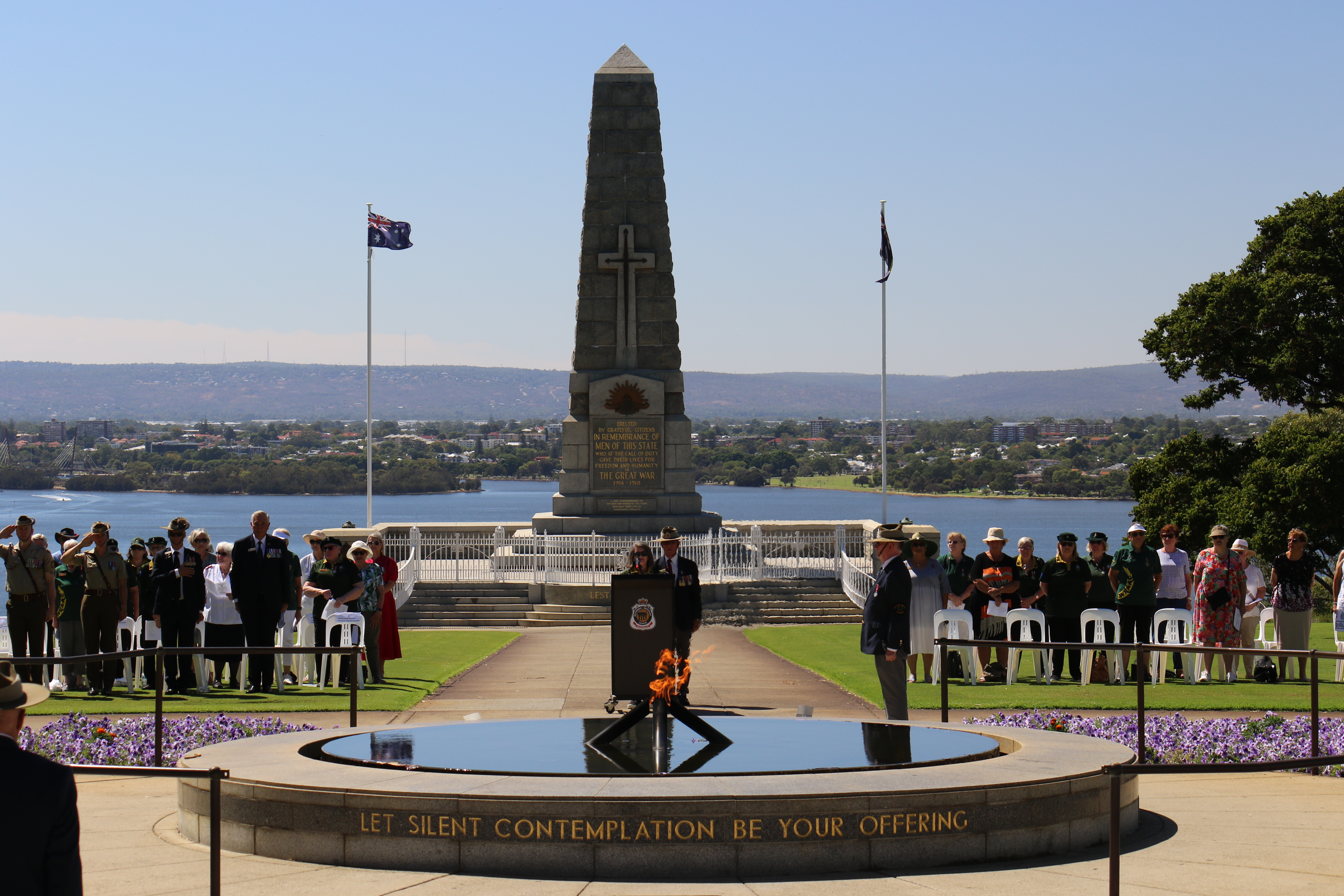
Annual remembrance service for the WRAAC

There were four directors of the service before the title of director was abolished: Kathleen Best (1951–1957); Dawn Jackson (1957–1972); Kathleen Fowler (1972–1977); and Barbara Maxwell (1977–1979).
