= Kathleen Best =

Australian Army officer

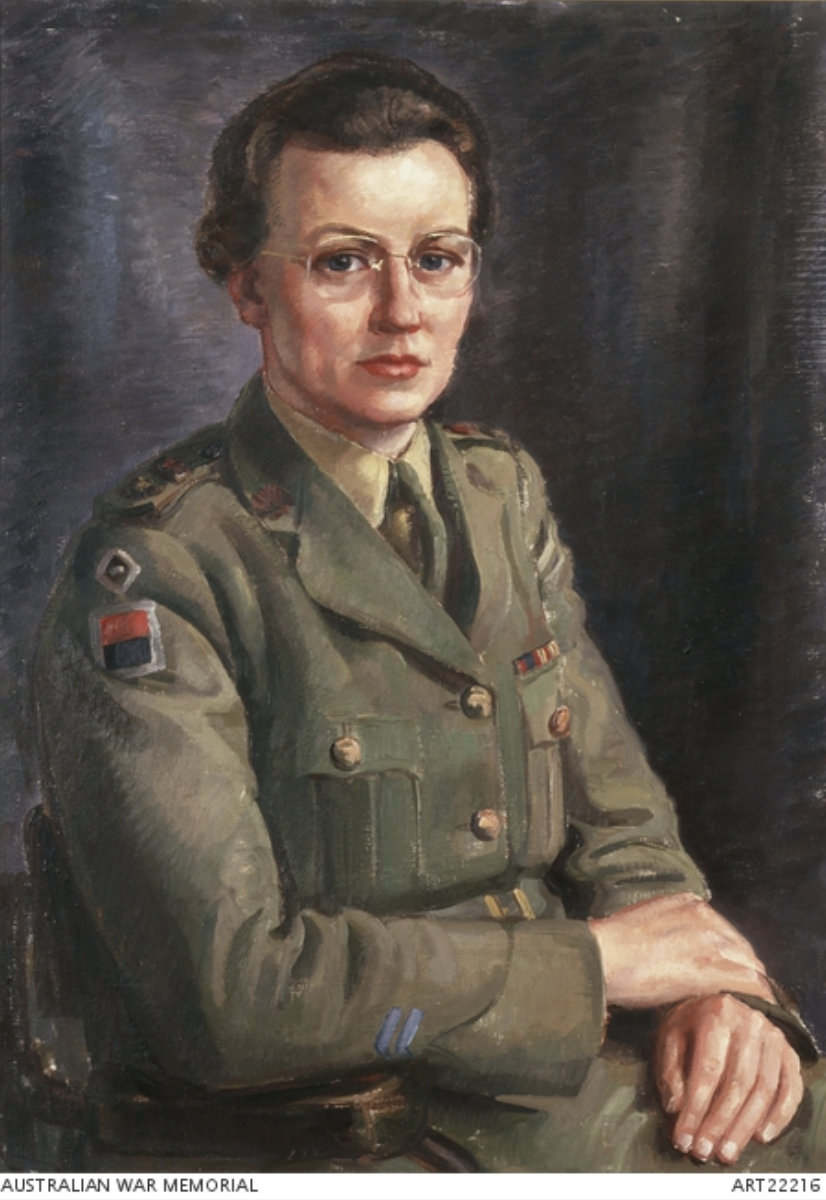
- 1944 portrait by Nora Heysen
- Born: 28 August 1910; Summer Hill, New South Wales
- Died: 15 November 1957 (aged 47); Epworth Hospital, Richmond, Victoria
- Burial place: Fawkner Crematorium and Memorial Park
- Military career
- Allegiance: Australia
- Branch: Second Australian Imperial Force; Women's Royal Australian Army Corps
- Service years: 1940–1944; 1951–1957
- Rank: Colonel Matron
- Units: Australian Army Nursing Service
- Commands: Women's Royal Australian Army Corps (1951–57)
- Conflicts: Second World War; Battle of Greece; Battle of Crete
- Awards: Officer of the Order of the British Empire; Royal Red Cross

Colonel Matron Kathleen Annie Louise Best, OBE, RRC (28 August 1910 – 15 November 1957), was the first director of the Women's Royal Australian Army Corps.

== Early life ==
Best was born at Summer Hill in Sydney on 28 August 1910.

She was educated in Sydney and undertook nursing training at Western Suburbs Hospital, and midwifery training in the Crown Street Women's Hospital. Having completed her training, Best nursed at Wyong Hospital on the New South Wales central coast. She was appointed acting matron at the Rachel Forster Hospital in Sydney and later deputy-matron at the Masonic Hospital in Ashfield.

== Second World War ==
Best's military nursing career began with her appointment to the Australian Army Nursing Service on 30 May 1940, during the Second World War. She was posted as matron to the 2/5th Australian General Hospital and embarked for the Middle East in October that year. After opening in Palestine in December 1940, the hospital moved to Greece in April 1941.

During the short-lived campaign, Best – the senior matron in Greece – and her colleagues endured regular German air raids. She and 39 colleagues volunteered to remain in Greece after the evacuation, knowing that they risked captivity. Within hours of deciding to stay, however, they too were ordered to leave, the last Australian nurses to do so. They survived further German air attacks on their ship before reaching Crete and later Alexandria, Egypt. Best was awarded the Royal Red Cross for her service in the Greek campaign.

The 2/5th Australian General Hospital was then re-established in Palestine and reorganised under Best's supervision, but in August 1941 moved again, this time to Eritrea on the African coast. By March 1942, she had returned to Australia, where her appointment to the AIF was terminated in mid-June. This, however, was not the end of her contribution to Australia's war effort. A month after leaving the AIF she became the controller of full-time Voluntary Aid Detachments, which in September became part of the Australian Army Medical Women's Service.

Best held this post for seven months until she received a promotion to lieutenant colonel in February 1943, and was posted as assistant adjutant general (Women's Services) at Land Headquarters in Melbourne, Australia. In September 1944, she became assistant director of Women's Re-establishment and Training for the Department of Postwar Reconstruction. Among her responsibilities was the task of assisting servicewomen and female war-workers to adjust to civilian life once the war ended.

== Later life ==
On 12 February 1951, Best became the founding director of the Australian Women's Army Corps, which was shortly after given the designation "Royal". In September 1952 she reached the rank of honorary colonel, and four years later, in 1956, was appointed Officer of the Order of the British Empire. In 1954, she became chairman of the Red Cross Button Day committee in Melbourne.

Despite her achievements, Best has been described as a modest woman with an engaging sense of humour. Those who served under her considered her an inspiring leader who ruled with a firm hand, but who treated her subordinates with fairness. A memorial gateway commemorating her service was constructed at the entrance to the WRAAC School at George's Heights in Sydney, Australia.

== Death ==
Best became ill and died of melanomatosis on 15 November 1957, aged 47, at Epworth Hospital in Richmond, Melbourne. She was buried at Fawkner Cemetery, Victoria.

== Sources ==
- Article on Colonel Matron Kathleen Annie Louise Best in the Daily Telegraph Mirror, Tuesday 31 October 1995, p. 34

Military offices
New office	Director of the Women's Royal Australian Army Corps; 1951–1957	Succeeded by Colonel Dawn Jackson
