= Sybil Irving =

Australian military officer (1897–1973)

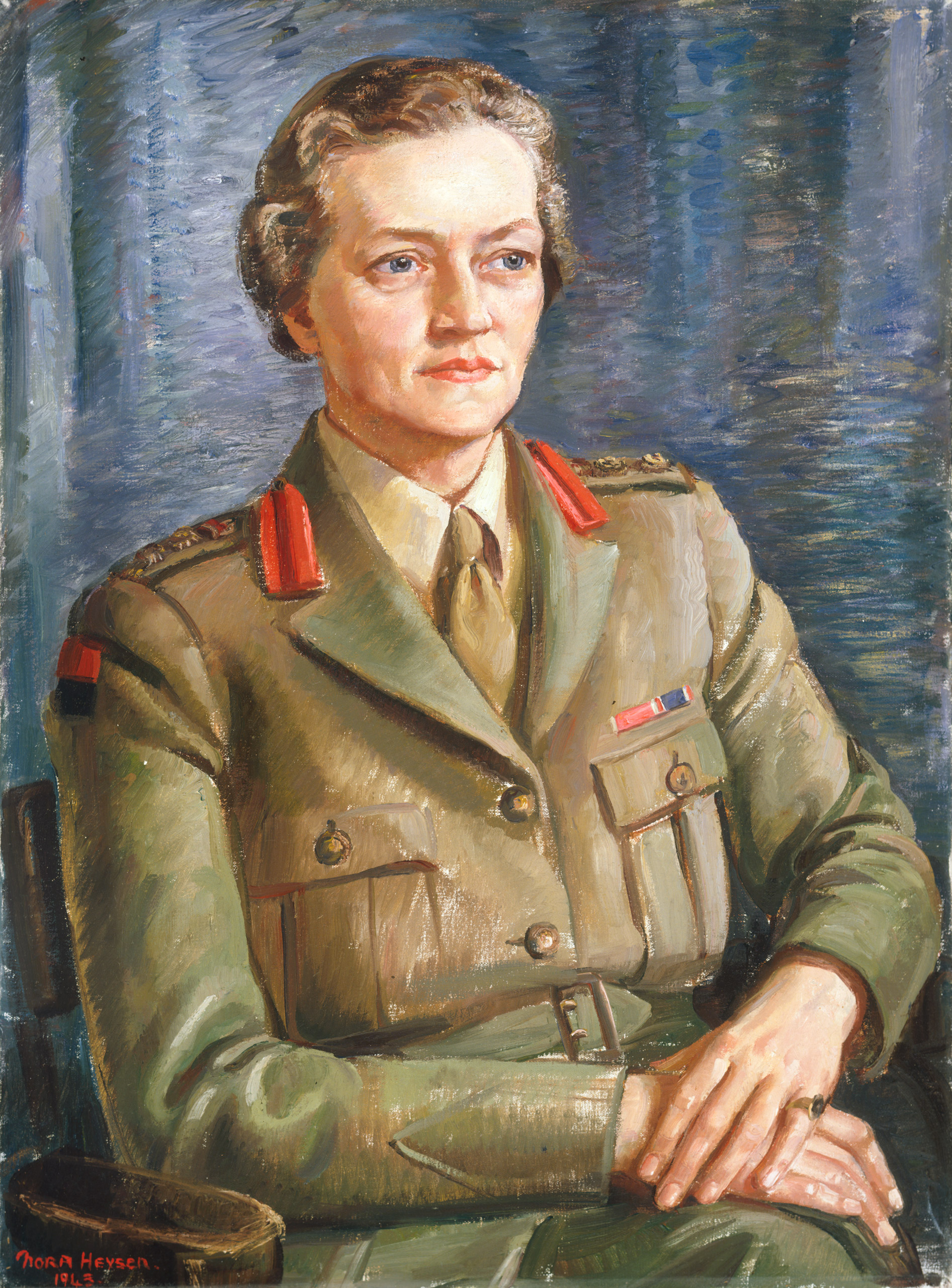
- 1943 portrait by war artist Nora Heysen
- Born: 25 February 1897; Victoria Barracks, Melbourne, Colony of Victoria
- Died: 28 March 1973 (aged 76); South Yarra, Melbourne
- Relatives: Godfrey Irving (father)
- Military career
- Allegiance: Australia
- Branch: Australian Women's Army Service
- Service years: 1941–1946
- Rank: Colonel
- Commands: Australian Women's Army Service; Women's Royal Australian Army Corps (as Honorary Colonel)
- Conflicts: World War II
- Awards: Member of the Order of the British Empire
- Other work: Secretary, Girl Guides' Association, Victoria (1924–1940); General secretary, Victorian division of the Red Cross (1947–1959); Consultant, Victorian Old People's Welfare Council (1961–1971)

Sybil Howy Irving MBE (25 February 1897 – 28 March 1973) was an Australian military officer who was the founder and controller of the Australian Women's Army Service during World War II. She served in this position from 1941 to 1946, and was active in charity and social organisations until she was aged 74.

== Social work ==
Irving was born on 25 February 1897 at Victoria Barracks in Melbourne. She was the oldest of three children and her father, Godfrey Irving, was an Army officer who later held senior positions in the Australian Army. The family moved frequently as her father was posted to new positions, and she was educated at schools in most states.

Irving worked in several social welfare positions after leaving school. During World War I she served in a Red Cross voluntary aid detachment in Australia. In 1924, she became secretary of the Girl Guides' Association, Victoria, a position she held until 1940. In 1935, she was one of the two founders of the Victorian Society for Crippled Children and worked for this organisation until her death. She was appointed a Member of the Order of the British Empire (MBE) on 2 January 1939 for her services to social welfare services in Victoria. Irving left the Girl Guides Association in 1940 to work as Assistant-Secretary of the Victorian Red Cross Society.

== War service ==
In September 1941, Irving accepted an offer from the Army's Adjutant-General, Major General Victor Stantke, to lead the newly formed Australian Women's Army Service (AWAS). This appointment was mainly made on the basis of her family background and guiding experience, and Irving later acknowledged that she had "no qualifications at all" for the position. She was appointed Controller of the AWAS in October and immediately travelled around Australia to recruit officers. She was promoted to lieutenant colonel in January 1942, and successfully established a framework into which 24,000 female soldiers eventually enlisted.

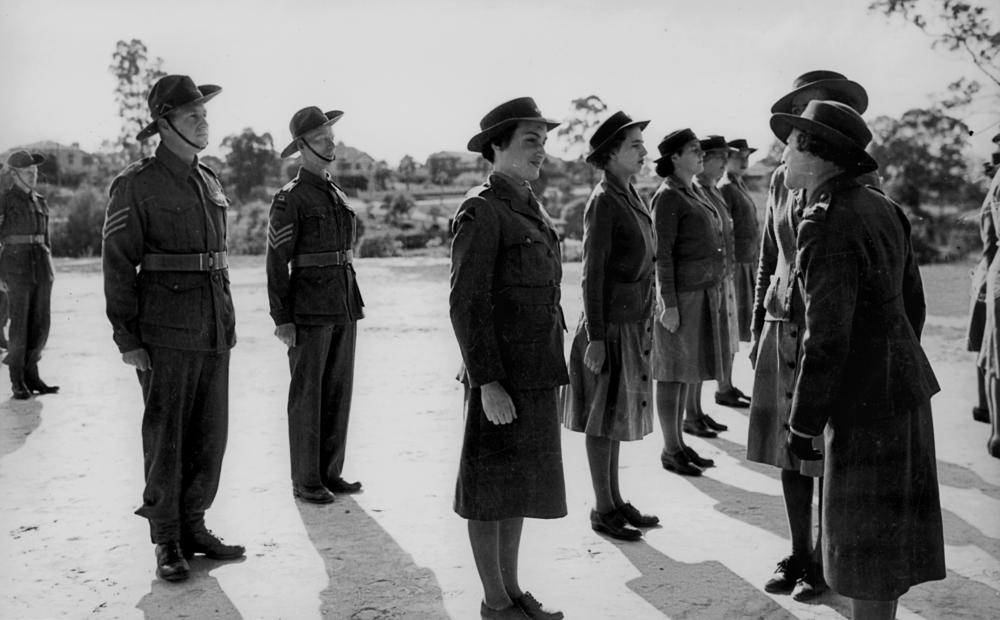
Irving inspecting a parade of new AWAS members in Brisbane during August 1942

Irving was based at the AWAS' headquarters in Melbourne throughout the war. One of her officers described her as "Impressive. She could be abrupt, decisive and self-assured in the public arena in a way women were not expected – or trained to be in those days, and this stood her in good stead". She used Guiding as the basis for the AWAS, and this practice drew both praise and criticism. She also supported the Australian Government's policy that members of the AWAS not operate weapons, arguing that "these girls will be the mothers of the children who will rebuild Australia. They must not have the death of another mother's son on their hands". Irving did not support the Government's restriction against servicewomen being deployed to operational areas in the South West Pacific Area, and succeeded in having this overturned in 1945.

Irving was promoted to colonel in February 1943, and had 20,000 women serving under her when the AWAS reached its peak strength in 1944. At the end of the war, she encouraged AWAS members to undertake further training to find jobs in the civilian labour force, but only a small proportion of servicewomen did so. Irving left the Army in January 1947 when the AWAS was disbanded. She later wrote to all her former officers to inquire after their welfare and ask what they were doing in the post-war world.

Irving served alongside her sister Freda Irving, who was a journalist both pre and post-war, and who worked on her staff.

== Later life ==
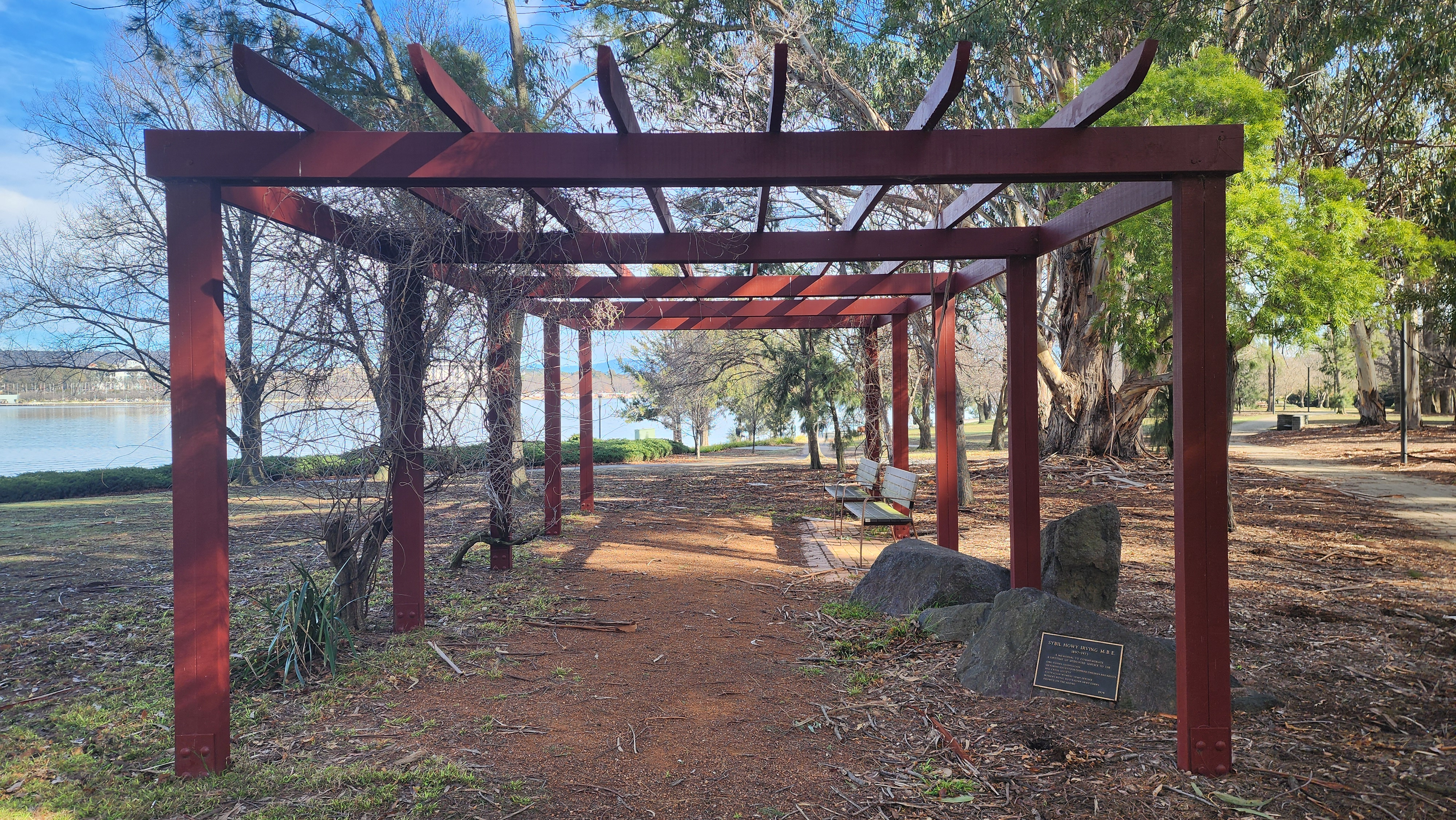
Sybil Howy Irving Memorial in Commonwealth Park, Canberra

Irving returned to social work after completing her military service. In 1947, she became general secretary of the Victorian Division of the Red Cross and held this position until 1959. She was also appointed Honorary Colonel of the Women's Royal Australian Army Corps (WRAAC) when the Army re-formed its women's service in 1951. In 1960 and 1961, she took a 13-month-long holiday in Britain and Europe, during which time she resigned from the WRAAC in 1961.

After returning to Australia Irving worked as a consultant for the Victorian Old People's Welfare Council organising elderly citizens' clubs until she retired in 1971. She died on 28 March 1973 at her home in South Yarra and was buried with full military honours at Fawkner cemetery. Following her death Irving's friends and former colleagues raised funds for memorials to her in all of the Australian capital cities.

A 1943 painting of her by war artist Nora Heysen is in the Australian War Memorial collection in Canberra.
