= Australian Women's Army Service =

Australian service in World War II

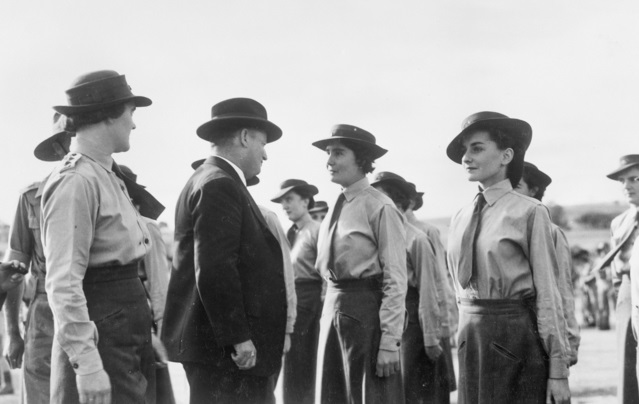
Northam, Western Australia, 1943. Minister for the Army Frank Forde and Lieutenant Ivy Levitzke inspecting Australian Women's Army Service personnel at the Western Training Centre

The Australian Women's Army Service (AWAS) was a non-medical women's service established in Australia during the Second World War. Raised on 13 August 1941 to "release men from certain military duties for employment in fighting units" the service grew to over 20,000-strong and provided personnel to fill various roles including administration, driving, catering, signals and intelligence. Following the end of the Second World War, the service was demobilised and ceased to exist by 1947. It later provided a cadre of experienced personnel to the Women's Royal Australian Army Corps when it was established in 1951.

== Formation and structure ==
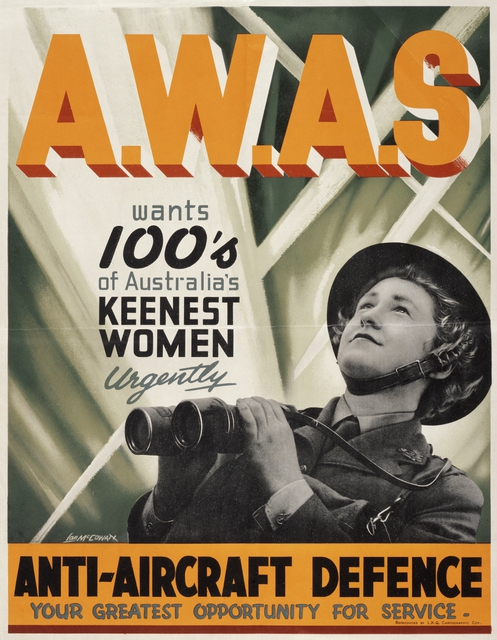
Recruitment poster

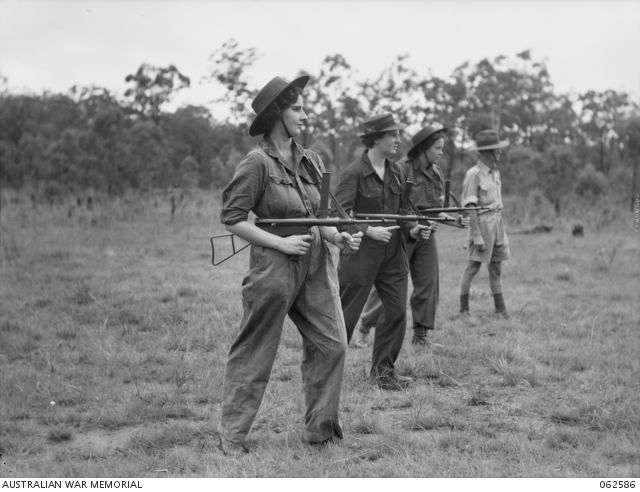
Belmont, Queensland, ca 1942. AWAS members instructed in the use of the Owen machine carbine

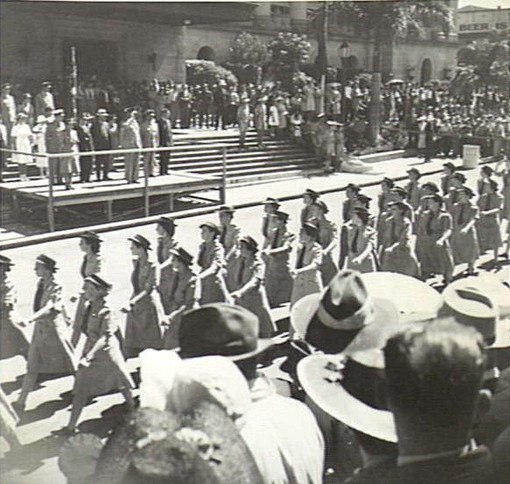
Brisbane 24 March 1945, AWAS from the Northern Territory during the Victory Loan March

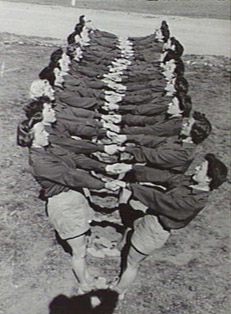
Physical training instructors from the AWAS and Australian Army Medical Women's Service

The Service recruited women between the ages of 18 and 45 and it was initially envisaged they would serve in a variety of roles including clerks, typists, cooks and drivers. During the war a total of 24,026 women enlisted (with a maximum strength of 20,051 in January 1944). The AWAS had 71 barracks around the country. They were paid wages equal to two-thirds that of their male equivalents.

The AWAS had their own rank and administrative arrangements and they reported to the Chief of General Staff (CGS). The Commanding Officer or "Controller" of the AWAS was equivalent to a lieutenant colonel. The Controller of the AWAS (until the end of 1946) was Sybil Irving, who in October 1941 set about selecting twenty-eight women as officers to form the nucleus of the AWAS. By 23 November 1941, these women together with Irving commenced training at Guide House, Yarra Junction, Victoria.

== Service ==
AWAS personnel initially served in Headquarters, and Base Installations, and later in a number of direct command Army units. 3,618 served with the Royal Australian Artillery and they manned the Fixed Defences of Australia from Hobart in the South and Cairns in the north, and Perth in the west. A total of 3,600 AWAS personnel served in the Australian Corps of Signals. Officers and other ranks of the Australian Intelligence Corps were involved in (and commended for) their highly secret work. Motor transport drivers drove cars, ambulances, trucks (up to 3 tons), jeeps, floating jeeps, Bren Gun Carriers and amphibious vehicles.

Despite the pleadings of General of the Army Douglas MacArthur and General Sir Thomas Blamey to allow the AWAS to serve overseas, they were at first prevented from doing so. This caused some difficulties. For example, several members of the AWAS served in the British Borneo Civil Affairs Unit, but they had to be left behind when the unit deployed overseas in preparation for the liberation of Borneo in 1945. It was only during that year that the Government relented to allow some AWAS to serve overseas, with a detachment raised for service in New Guinea. The AWAS thus became the only non-medical women's service to send personnel overseas during the war.

By April 1945, Colonel Irving had selected a group from thousands of applicants who were eager to serve overseas. The women selected for posting to New Guinea were paraded at Enoggera, Queensland, and were kitted out for the tropics, lectured on what to expect and what was expected of them, inoculated against certain tropical diseases, started on anti-malaria medicines and given extra physical training before sailing.

Lieutenant-Colonel Margaret Spencer was given command of the first AWAS contingent to be posted overseas with the First Australian Army in New Guinea. She led a small advance party of AWAS officers and staff to Lae to prepare for the arrival of the main contingent. The main contingent of 342 women left on the MV Duntroon, sailing under Captain Lucy Crane, on 3 May 1945. The ship arrived on 7 May 1945. It was later discovered that, without the knowledge or approval of Australian authorities, three AWAS intelligence officers and troops attached to American forces had been taken to Hollandia in Dutch New Guinea, which was outside the area in which members of the AWAS were permitted to serve. They were therefore brought back to Lae.

The women were given a few days to acclimatize to the tropics and settle into the 68th AWAS Barracks on Butibum Road, Lae, near Voco Point before starting work. The barracks had been constructed by army engineers and New Guinean workers and the compound perimeter was enclosed by a high barbed wire fence patrolled by armed guards. Many women considered the high fences a symbol of constraint and the popular song "Don't Fence Me In" was often sung.

One day after landing in Lae, news came through of the Allied Victory in Europe.

A total of 385 AWAS in Lae served under the command of Lieutenant-Colonel Spencer. They served with First Army Headquarters and some supporting units, including in Ordnance and Signals. It was also discovered that unknown to Army authorities, two officers and three sergeants in Intelligence had earlier been moved from Brisbane to Dutch New Guinea in June 1944; once realised, these women were brought back to Lae to serve with the main contingent. A second AWAS contingent was assembled in Queensland for service on Bougainville, but the war ended before they could sail from Australia.

== Demobilisation ==
By 30 June 1947 all members of the AWAS had been demobilised. The Women's Royal Australian Army Corps (WRAAC) was formed in April 1951 to counter a manpower shortage that developed due to hostilities in the Korean Peninsula and post-World War II full employment. At the time of its formation, many senior WRAAC personnel had previously served in the AWAS. By the late 1970s female soldiers began integration into the Army at large and in early 1985, the WRAAC was disbanded.

== Notable women within the service ==
- Dolly Gurinyi Batcho (c1903-1973), a Larrakia woman who was part of Aboriginal Women's Hygiene Squad.
- Lorna Byrne (1897-1989), a Major within the AWAS.
- Dora Chapman (1911-1995), a sergeant within the service.
- Maude Kathleen Deasey (1909-1968), an assistant controller within the service.
- Freda Irving (1903-1984), a captain within the service.
- Sybil Irving (1897-1973), the founder and controller.
- Caroline Isaacson (1900-1962), a captain within the service.
- Joan McClintock (1922-1996), a driver in the service.
- Isla Victoria Murphy (1913-1967), an officer and later lieutenant colonel.
- Oodgeroo Noonuccal (1920-1993), an officer within the service.
- Eleanor Manning (1906-1986), the most senior officer in New South Wales.
- Beryl Noble (1907-1984), an officer in the service who headed up the Supervisory Personnel School.
- Pat Riggs (1921-1998), an officer and program manager for the Australian Broadcasting Control Unit.
- Margaret Joan Spencer (1912-1990), an officer and later temporary captain in the service.
- Nellie Elizabeth Stronach (1982-1991), a cook within the service.
- Freda Thompson (1906-1980), an ambulance driver and later acting sergeant.
- Joyce Ethel Whitworth (1911-1998), an officer within the service.

== See also ==
- Australian home front during World War II
- Australian Women's Land Army
- Auxiliary Territorial Service (UK)
- Bibra Lake AWAS Camp
- Female roles in the World Wars
- Women's Auxiliary Australian Air Force
- Women's Royal Australian Naval Service
