= List of nursing organizations =

== International nursing organizations ==
- International Council of Nurses (ICN)

== National nursing associations ==
- American Nurses Association
- Australian College of Nursing
- Canadian Indigenous Nurses Association
- Canadian Nurses Association (CNA)
- Danish Nurses' Organization (DNO)
- German Nurses Association (DBfk)
- Indian nurses association (India)
- Irish Nurses and Midwives Organisation (INMO)
- Japanese Nursing Association
- New Zealand Nurses Organisation
- Nursing Association of Nepal
- Philippine Nurses Association
- United Nurses Association (India)

== Certification and accreditation boards ==
- American Nurses Credentialing Center (ANCC)
- Bangladesh Nursing and Midwifery Council (BNMC)
- National Certification Corporation (NCC)
- National Council of State Boards of Nursing
- National League for Nursing Accrediting Commission (NLNAC)
- Nursing Council of New Zealand
- Nursing & Midwifery Council United Kingdom
- Nursing and Midwifery Board of Ireland (NMBI)
- Indian Nursing Council (see also state nursing councils in India)

== Honor societies ==
- Sigma Theta Tau honor society

== Professional fraternities ==
- Alpha Tau Delta (collegiate, professional fraternity in nursing)
- Chi Eta Phi (collegiate, predominantly African-American professional sorority in nursing)

== Specialty organizations ==
- Academy of Medical-Surgical Nurses (AMSN)
- Academy of Neonatal Nursing
- Alliance of Young Nurse Leaders and Advocates
- American Academy of Nurse Practitioners
- American Association of Legal Nurse Consultants
- American Association of Nurse Anesthetists
- American College of Nurse Practitioners
- American Psychiatric Nurses Association
- Association of Nurses in AIDS Care
- Association of periOperative Registered Nurses
- Association of Women's Health, Obstetric and Neonatal Nurses (AWHONN)
- Canadian Indigenous Nurses Association
- National Black Nurses Association
- Philippine Nurses Association of United Kingdom
- Society of Gynecologic Nurse Oncologists
- Space Nursing Society

== Unions ==
- Australian Nursing and Midwifery Federation
- Canadian Federation of Nurses' Unions (CFNU)
- California Nurses Association/National Nurses Organizing Committee (CNA/NNOC)
- Democratic Nursing Organisation of South Africa
- Finnish Union of Practical Nurses
- Irish Nurses and Midwives Organisation (INMO)
- La Fédération interprofessionnelle de la santé du Québec (FIQ/FIQP)
- Manitoba Nurses' Union
- National Nurses United (NNU)
- New South Wales Nurses and Midwives' Association
- New Zealand Nurses Organisation
- Ontario Nurses Association
- Pennsylvania Association of Staff Nurses and Allied Professionals
- Queensland Nurses' Union
- Royal College of Nursing
- South African Democratic Nurses' Union
- Tennessee Nurses Association
- United American Nurses
- United Nurses of Alberta
- Washington State Nurses Association

== Miscellaneous ==
- American Academy of Nursing
- American Association of Colleges of Nursing
- American Health Care Association
- American Red Cross Nursing Service
- DAR Hospital Corps
- Florence Network for Nursing and Midwifery
- National Institute of Nursing Research
- National League for Nursing (NLN)
- Nurse Practitioner Associates for Continuing Education (NPACE)
- Nursing Students Without Borders
- Registered Nurses' Association of Ontario
