= Nursing in Canada =

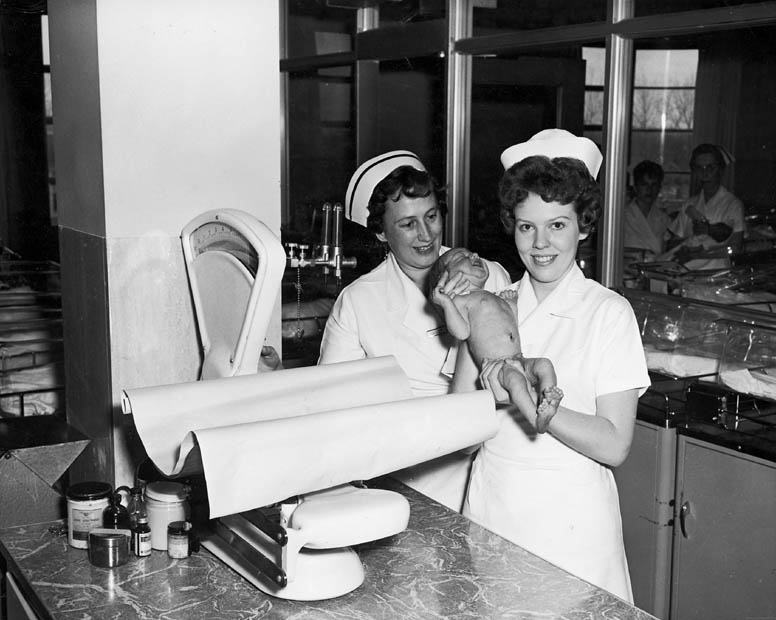
Two nurses with a baby in the nursery at Toronto East General and Orthopaedic Hospital, 1955

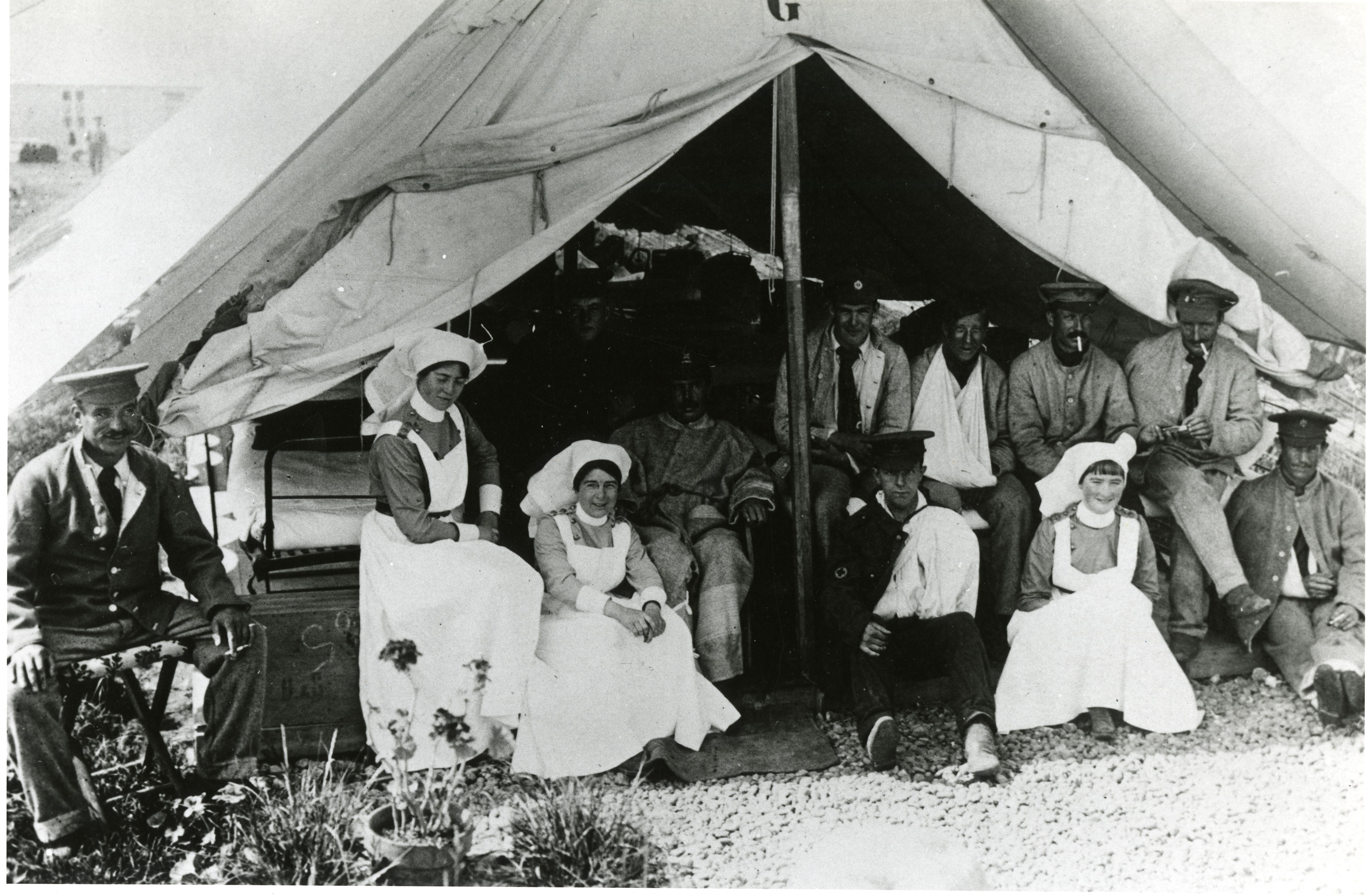
Canadian nurses with wounded soldiers

Nurses in Canada practise in a wide variety of settings, with various levels of training and experience. They provide evidence-based care and educate their patients about health and disease.

The role that nurses have played in the development of Canada has been recognized through the designation of seven National Historic Sites of Canada related to nursing. Five nurses' residences (the Ann Baillie Building, Begbie Hall, the Hersey Pavilion, the Pavillon Mailloux and the St. Boniface Hospital Nurses' Residence) were designated in commemoration of the growing professionalism of nursing and of the expanded role of nurses in health care over the course of the 20th century. The La Corne Nursing Station and the Wilberforce Red Cross Outpost were designated, in part, in honour of the role played by nurses in delivering health care to isolated areas.

Nurses in every setting demonstrate their commitment to continually improving their nursing practice by annually engaging in a written reflection, an analysis of the year, and 2 learning goals. Every nurse registered in the General or Extended class is required, under the Registered Health Professions Act, 1991, to participate in the Quality Assurance (QA) program.

== History ==
In 1617, Marie Rollet (1580-1649) arrived in New France with her husband, Louis Hébert, Québec's first apothecary. She became New France's first laywoman, by working with her husband to tend to those who were suffering from starvation and illness, including natives.

In 1639 in Quebec, Augustine nuns worked to open a mission that cared for people's spiritual and physical needs. This mission created the first nursing apprenticeship program in North America.

In the nineteenth century, some Catholic nursing orders spread their message across Canada. Most nurses were female and had only occasional consultation with a physician. Towards the end of the nineteenth century, hospital care and medical services improved and expanded. Much of this was due to Nightingale's influence. In 1874 the first formal nursing training program was started at the General and Marine Hospital in St. Catharines in Ontario.

In 1641, Jeanne Mance, a nurse from Langres, France, arrived at Fort Ville-Marie, New France. She was recruited by Father Charles Lallemant, a Jesuit priest, for the Société Notre-Dame de Montréal. In 1642, she established the Hôtel-Dieu de Montréal, one of the oldest hospitals in North America.

In 1737, Marie-Marguerite d'Youville founded the Sisters of Charity of Montreal, a religious order known as the Grey Nuns. In 1747, they were granted a charter to operate the General Hospital of Montreal. The order went on to expand to other cities across North America and is still in existence today. In 1990, she was canonized by Pope John Paul II, and is the first native-born Canadian to be elevated to sainthood by the Roman Catholic Church.

In the late nineteenth and early twentieth centuries, women made inroads into various professions including teaching, journalism, social work, and public health. These advances included the establishment of a Women's Medical College in Toronto (and in Kingston, Ontario) in 1883, attributed in part to the persistence of Emily Stowe, the first female physician to practise in Canada. Stowe's daughter, Augusta Stowe-Gullen, became the first woman to graduate from a Canadian medical school.

From 1884 to 1910, Mary Agnes Snively was the Superintendent of Nurses at the Toronto General Hospital's School of Nursing, where she established the first nursing student residence and a proper curriculum. In 1908, she became the first president of the Canadian Society of Superintendents of Training Schools for Nurses. She was also a co-founder of the International Council of Nurses and served as their Honorary Treasurer from 1900 to 1904.

Apart from a token few, women were outsiders to the male-dominated medical profession. Midwifery—practised along traditional lines by women—was restricted and practically died out by 1900. Even so, the great majority of childbirths took place at home until the 1920s, when hospitals became preferred, especially by women who were better educated, more modern, and more trusting in modern medicine.

=== Prairie province settlement ===
In the Prairie provinces, the first homesteaders relied on themselves for medical services. Poverty and geographic isolation empowered women to learn and practise medical care with the herbs, roots, and berries that worked for their mothers. They prayed for divine intervention but also practised supernatural magic that provided as much psychological as physical relief. The reliance on homeopathic remedies continued as trained nurses, doctors, and how-to manuals slowly reached the homesteaders in the early 20th century.

After 1900 medicine, and especially nursing, modernized and became well organized.

The Lethbridge Nursing Mission in Alberta was a representative Canadian voluntary mission. It was founded, independent of the Victorian Order of Nurses, in 1909 by Jessie Turnbull Robinson. A former nurse, Robinson was elected as president of the Lethbridge Relief Society and began district nursing services aimed at poor women and children. The mission was governed by a volunteer board of women directors and began by raising money for its first year of service through charitable donations and payments from the Metropolitan Life Insurance Company. The mission also blended social work with nursing, becoming the dispenser of unemployment relief.

Richardson (1998) examines the social, political, economic, class, and professional factors that contributed to ideological and practical differences between leaders of the Alberta Association of Graduate Nurses (AAGN), established in 1916, and the United Farm Women of Alberta (UFWA), founded in 1915, regarding the promotion and acceptance of midwifery as a recognized subspecialty of registered nurses. Accusing the AAGN of ignoring the medical needs of rural Alberta women, the leaders of the UFWA worked to improve economic and living conditions of women farmers. Irene Parlby, the UFWA's first president, lobbied for the establishment of a provincial Department of Public Health, government-provided hospitals and doctors, and passage of a law to permit nurses to qualify as registered midwives. The AAGN leadership opposed midwife certification, arguing that nursing curricula left no room for midwife study, and thus nurses were not qualified to participate in home births. In 1919 the AAGN compromised with the UFWA, and they worked together for the passage of the Public Health Nurses Act that allowed nurses to serve as midwives in regions without doctors. Thus, Alberta's District Nursing Service was created in 1919 to coordinate women's health resources of the province. Alberta's District Nursing Service developed chiefly from the organized and persistent political activism of UFWA members and only minimally from the actions of professional nursing groups that were clearly uninterested in rural Canadians' medical needs.

The Alberta District Nursing Service administered health care in the predominantly rural and impoverished areas of Alberta in the first half of the 20th century. Founded in 1919 to meet maternal and emergency medical needs by the United Farm Women (UFWA), the Nursing Service treated prairie settlers living in primitive areas lacking doctors and hospitals. Nurses provided prenatal care, worked as midwives, performed minor surgery, conducted medical inspections of schoolchildren, and sponsored immunization programs. The post-Second World War discovery of large oil and gas reserves resulted in economic prosperity and the expansion of local medical services. The passage of provincial health and universal hospital insurance in 1957 precipitated the eventual phasing out of the obsolete District Nursing Service in 1976.

=== Military service ===
Over 4000 women served as nurses in uniform in the Canadian Armed Forces during the Second World War. They were called "Nursing Sisters" and had already been professionally trained in civilian life. However, in military service they achieved an elite status well above what they had experienced as civilians. The Nursing Sisters had much more responsibility and autonomy, and had more opportunity to use their expertise than civilian nurses. They were often close to the front lines, and the military doctors – all men – delegated significant responsibility to the nurses because of the high level of casualties, the shortages of physicians, and extreme working conditions.

== Education ==
Registered Nurses (RNs) and Registered/Licensed Practical Nurses (L/RPNs) study a range of mandated subjects including physiology, anatomy, pathophysiology, epidemiology, microbiology, nutrition and dietetics, pharmacology, organic chemistry, nursing theory and nursing skill. Extensive hands-on practical training, starts as early as year one and extends to graduation.

Canadians wishing to become nurses are encouraged by the Canadian Nurses Association to complete a bachelor's degree. All provinces and territories, with the exception of Yukon and Quebec, require a (typically 4-year) bachelor's degree. some universities offer a two year alternative.

=== Registered nurses ===
Most provinces prefer that the Registered Nurse (RN) hold a Baccalaureate degree, typically a Bachelor of Science in Nursing (B.Sc.N) or Bachelor of Nursing B.N.) or similar (degree names vary slightly depending on the granting institution). Currently, many RNs have been "grandfathered in" and are practising with a previously obtained 2-3 year diploma that was achieved at the college level, which in many cases was or is equal to practical nursing education. This cohort of RNs are encouraged by the Canadian Nurses Association and their respective provincial colleges to return and upgrade their education to that of the Baccalaureate prepared RN due to research suggesting that the degree-prepared RNs have improved outcomes for patients and families. RN education now is mandated to be 4 years in length through a degree granting institution (a university) in all provinces except Quebec. However, some institutions have "accelerated" baccalaureate programs at 3 years in length, where students study full-time and over the summers. Additionally, there are 2 year programs, but entrants into these programs typically have been granted previous non-nursing degrees.

=== Practical nurses ===
Registered Practical Nurses (RPNs) is a title applied to practical nurses in Ontario and Quebec, which is not to be confused with Registered Psychiatric Nurses, and are equivalent to Licensed Practical Nurses (LPNs) in the other provinces and territories of Canada which favour this title. Practical nurses are educated at the college level after two to three years of study and are granted a diploma upon successful completion. Practical nursing training is quite similar to the registered nurses' education with many of the same subjects, and with the same nursing skills as RN; however, given the reduced period of study, students receive a more focused foundational body of knowledge. In Ontario, approved practical nursing diploma programs incorporate over 600 hours of clinical placement and acute care training to prepare graduates for the Regulatory Exam for Practical Nurses (REx-PN).

This results in the inability of RPNs to provide autonomous care to highly acute and unstable patients, unless caring for the patient in collaboration with a Registered Nurse. RNs are also encouraged to collaborate with other RNs on highly acute and unstable patients; however, they may do so independently. Practical nursing students are exposed to hands-on training as early as the first semester of year one, continuing through to graduation, making RPNs sometimes more skill proficient post graduation. Practical nursing training is extensive compared to practical nursing training in the United States. Many RNs in the United States continue to graduate with two year associate degree programs. Should these nurses with such training wish to immigrate to Canada, they would be required to challenge the practical nursing qualification in Canada as it is viewed as equivalent to the two year registered nurse degree program in the US.

=== Graduate nursing education ===
Uniquely in Canada, McGill University offers a "direct entry" Master's degree, where applicants do not need previous education in nursing, achieving licensure as well as a MSc (Master of Science). However, this program is longer (by one year) than equivalent "nurse entry" degrees.

RNs can pursue further education at the Masters or Doctoral level, receiving a Masters of Science in Nursing or PhD, respectively. Additionally, there are several different types of master's degrees. Depending upon field of study, the RN can choose to study to become a Nurse Practitioner, an Advanced Practice Nurse, a Registered Nurse First Assist (Surgeon's assistant) in addition to many other fields of study. Unlike the United States, the role of Registered Nurse Anesthetist does not presently exist in Canada.

=== Graduate education for nurses in other fields ===
- Registered nurses with university prepared education, interested in advancing their studies or practice, may choose to pursue graduate study to become a Nurse Practitioner. A Nurse Practitioner (NP) is a registered nurse with advanced university education who provides personalized, quality health care to patients. Nurse Practitioners provide a full range of health care services to individuals, families and communities in a variety of settings including hospitals and community based clinics. They work in a collaborative partnership with physicians, nurses and other health care professionals such as social workers, midwives, mental health professionals and pharmacists.

Nurse Practitioners assess, diagnose, treat and monitor a wide range of health problems using an evidence based approach to their practice. They consult and collaborate with physicians and other health care professionals to meet the needs of the patient population. Chronic disease management, health promotion and illness prevention, as well as helping patients navigate through the health care system are integral to their approach to patient care. Engaging patients as full partners in their care plan with attention to self-care to the extent that patients are willing and able to participate is an important aspect of the underlying philosophy of NP Led Clinics. In addition, Nurse Practitioners are experts in community health care needs assessment and program planning, implementation and evaluation. These programs are targeted to specific health care needs identified in collaboration with their communities.

=== Specialities ===
Specialty certification is available through the Canadian Nurses Association in 22 practice areas, including:

- cardiovascular nursing
- community health nursing
- critical care nursing
- pediatric critical care nursing
- emergency nursing
- gastroenterology nursing
- gerontological nursing
- hospice palliative care nursing
- medical-surgical nursing
- neonatal nursing
- nephrology nursing
- neuroscience nursing
- occupational health nursing
- oncology nursing
- orthopedic nursing
- pediatric nursing
- peri-anesthesia nursing
- obstetrical nursing
- peri-operative nursing
- psychiatric and mental health nursing
- rehabilitation nursing
- Wound, ostomy, and continence nursing

Nursing specialty certification generally requires practice, experience, and passing a test based on competencies for a specific medical or surgical domain.

== Nursing licensure ==
Like other regulated professions, after graduation from an approved program in a recognized school, nursing students pass a licensing test before they can practice as a nurse.

- After completing a 2-3 year diploma program in nursing and passing the Canadian Practical Nurse Registration Examination (CPNRE) Computer Based Examination, one can work as an RPN.
- After completing a 4-year bachelor's degree in nursing or Bachelor of Science in nursing and passing the National Council Licensure Examination (NCLEX-RN) Computer Based Examination, one can work as an RN.
- After completing a professional master's degree in nursing and passing appropriate nurse practitioner examinations, one may work as a NP.

== Types of nurses in Canada ==
- Registered Nurse (RN). RNs obtain a four-year baccalaureate degree in nursing from a college or university. There are also accelerated two or three year baccalaureate degree nursing programs.
- Registered Practical Nurse (RPN) in Ontario and Quebec. RPNs obtain a 2- or 3-year diploma in Practical Nursing.
- Licensed Practical Nurse (LPN), in the other Canadian provinces (British Columbia, Alberta, Saskatchewan, Manitoba, Prince Edward Island, Nova Scotia, New Brunswick, Newfoundland and Labrador and the territories). Licensed practical nurse is equivalent to registered practical nurse in Canada and is a region specific title.
- Registered Psychiatric Nurse (RPN) is licensed to practice only in British Columbia, Alberta, Saskatchewan, Manitoba, and the territories. This title should not be confused with registered practical nurse in the provinces of Ontario and Quebec.
- Nurse Practitioner (NP) is an RN with additional training in advanced nursing which can perform additional tasks in their defined area and scope of practice.

== Types of Training or Specialties ==
After receiving their initial 4-year baccalaureate degree or 2–3 years diploma and passing their licence exams, National Council Licensure Examination (NCLEX) or Canadian Practical Nurse Registration Examination (CPRNRE), nurses take further education to specialize in whatever agency or department they are employed. It is not necessary but is encouraged by employers to join relevant professional associations for the facilitation of learning safe practices and timely adaptation, etc.

- Cardiovascular Nursing - i.e. Look after those recovering from cardiac procedures such as bypass, angioplasty, or pacemaker surgery.
  - Canadian Council of Cardiovascular Nurses (CCCN)
    - Cardiovascular Nursing Certification Exam Competencies
- Community Health Nursing - i.e. Play key roles in disease, disability, and injury prevention, as well as in health promotion.
  - Community Health Nurses of Canada (CHNC)
    - Community Health Nursing Certification Exam Competencies
- Critical Care Nursing - i.e. Also known as ICU nurses, critical care nurses use their advanced skills to care for patients who are critically ill and at high risk for life-threatening health problems.
  - Canadian Association of Critical Care Nurses (CACCN)
    - Critical Care Nursing Certification Exam Competencies
- Critical Care Pediatric Nursing - i.e. ICU with children
  - Uses CACCN
    - Critical Care Pediatrics Nursing Certification Exam Competencies
- Diabetes Nursing - i.e. Helps manage and educate those with diabetes.
  - Designation: CDE from the Canadian Diabetes Educator Certification Board (CDECB)
    - Diabetes Educator Standards 2014
- Emergency Nursing - i.e. Treat patients in emergency situations where they're experiencing trauma or injury. These nurses quickly recognize life-threatening problems and are trained to help solve them on the spot. They can work in hospital emergency rooms, ambulances, helicopters, urgent care centers, sports arenas, and more.
  - Designation: ENC(C) - Emergency Nurse Certified (Canada)
  - National Emergency Nurses Association (NENA)
    - Emergency Nursing Certification Exam Competencies
- Enterostomal Therapy Nursing - i.e. Therapy nursing to individuals requiring wound, ostomy and continence care.
  - Designation: CETN(C) — Certified Enterostomal Therapy Nurse (Canada)
  - Canadian Association for Enterostomal Therapy (CAET)
    - Competencies [PDF, 170.9 KB]
- Gastroenterology Nursing - i.e. Disorders and illnesses such as constipation, diarrhea, reflux, ulcers, food allergies, Crohn's disease, ulcerative colitis, colon cancer, and rectal cancer, among others.
  - Designation: CGN(C) — Certified in Gastroenterology Nursing (Canada)
  - National Nursing Specialty Association: Canadian Society of Gastroenterology Nurses and Associates (CSGNA)
  - Competencies [PDF, 104.8 KB]
- Gerontological nursing - i.e. Work in collaboration with older adults, their families, and communities to support healthy aging, maximum functioning, and quality of life.
  - Designation: GNC(C) — Gerontological Nurse Certified (Canada)
  - National Nursing Specialty Association: Canadian Gerontological Nursing Association (CGNA)
  - Competencies [PDF, 314.1 KB]
- Hospice Palliative Care Nursing - i.e. Relieves suffering and improves quality of life for people of any age and at any stage in a serious illness, whether that illness is curable, chronic, or life-threatening.
  - Designation: CHPCN(C) — Certified in Hospice Palliative Care Nursing (Canada)
  - National Nursing Specialty Association: Canadian Hospice Palliative Care Association (CHPCA)
  - Competencies [PDF, 524.5 KB]
- Medical-Surgical Nursing - i.e. All forms of nursing from preoperative to post-operative problems.
  - Designation: CMSN(C) — Certified in Medical-Surgical Nursing (Canada)
  - National Nursing Specialty Association: Canadian Association of Medical and Surgical Nurses (CAMSN)
  - Competencies [PDF, 353.3 KB]
- Nephrology Nursing - i.e. Kidney related diseases and physiology.
  - Designation: CNeph(C) — Certified in Nephrology (Canada)
  - National Nursing Specialty Association: Canadian Association of Nephrology Nurses and Technologists (CANNT)
  - Competencies [PDF, 534.6 KB]
- Neuroscience Nursing - i.e. Prevent illness and to improve health outcomes for people with, or at risk for, neurological disorders.
  - Designation: CNN(C) — Certified in Neuroscience Nursing (Canada)
  - National Nursing Specialty Association: Canadian Association of Neuroscience Nurses (CANN)
  - Competencies [PDF, 122.6 KB]
- Occupational Health Nursing - i.e. Work to prevent, investigate, and treat workplace related illnesses and injuries.
  - Designation: COHN(C) — Certified in Occupational health nursing (Canada)
  - National Nursing Specialty Association: Canadian Occupational Health Nurses Association (COHNA)
  - Competencies [PDF, 545.4 KB]
- Oncology Nursing - i.e. Cancer related care in which nurses administer chemotherapy, work in clinical trials, deliver care to patients receiving radiation treatment, and acquire specialized skills (e.g. central line management).
  - Designation: CON(C) — Certified in Oncology Nursing (Canada)
  - National Nursing Specialty Association: Canadian Association of Nurses in Oncology (CANO)
  - Competencies [PDF, 515.5 KB]
- Orthopaedic Nursing - i.e. Care for patients with musculoskeletal diseases and disorders, such as arthritis, broken bones, joint replacements, fractures, diabetes, genetic malformations and osteoporosis.
  - Designation: ONC(C) — Orthopaedic Nursing Certified (Canada)
  - National Nursing Specialty Association: Canadian Orthopaedic Nurses Association (CONA)
  - Competencies [PDF, 166.1 KB]
- PeriAnesthesia Nursing - i.e. Monitor patients who are recovering from anesthesia and medical procedures.
  - Designation: PANC(C) — PeriAnesthesia Nurse Certified (Canada)
  - National Nursing Specialty Association: National Association of PeriAnesthesia Nurses of Canada (NAPANc)
  - Competencies [PDF, 548.9 KB]
- Perinatal Nursing - i.e. They teach mothers-to-be about pre-natal health, and what they'll experience while carrying a baby. They also educate patients on childbirth options, and how to bond with and care for the baby after it is born.
  - Designation: PNC(C) — Perinatal Nurse Certified (Canada)
  - National Nursing Specialty Association: Canadian Association of Perinatal and Women’s Health Nurses (CAPWHN)
  - Competencies [PDF, 293.5 KB]
- Perioperative Nursing - i.e. Work in hospital surgical departments, day-surgery units (also called ambulatory surgery), clinics and physicians' offices. They work closely with the surgical patient, family members and other health-care professionals to help plan, implement and evaluate treatment.
  - Designation: CPN(C) — Certified in Perioperative Nursing (Canada)
  - National Nursing Specialty Association: Operating Room Nurses Association of Canada (ORNAC)
  - Competencies [PDF, 696.7 KB]
- Psychiatric and Mental Health Nursing - i.e. Provide support to people suffering from various mental health conditions. The work involves helping the patient to recover from their illness or to come to terms with it in order to lead a positive life.
  - Registered Psychiatric Nurse Regulators of Canada (RPNRC)
  - Canadian Federation of Mental Health Nurses (CFMHN)
    - CFMHN Canadian Standards for Psychiatric-Mental Health Nursing Standards of Practice
- Rehabilitation Nursing - i.e. Help individuals affected by chronic illness or physical disability to achieve their greatest potential, adapt to their disabilities, and work toward productive, independent lives.
  - Canadian Association of Rehabilitation Nurses (CARN)
    - Rehabilitation Nursing Certification Exam Competencies

== Legal regulation ==
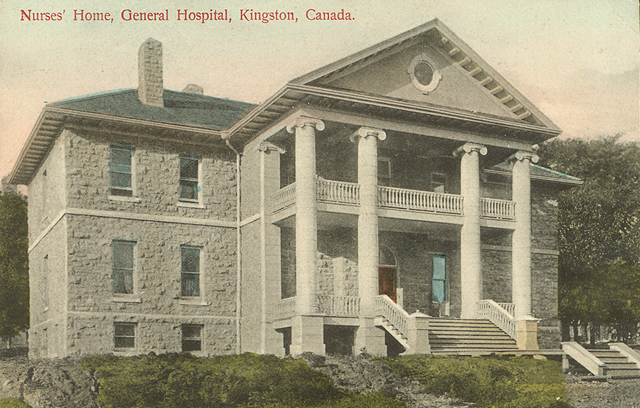
A circa 1910 postcard of the Anne Baillie Building in Kingston, Ontario

The profession of nursing is regulated at the provincial and territorial level in keeping with the principles of professional regulation endorsed by the International Council of Nurses. In the western provinces, psychiatric nurses are governed by distinct legislation.

All registered nurses and nurse practitioners in the province of Alberta are expected to maintain their clinical competence in order receive an annual practice permit from the College and Association of Registered Nurses of Alberta which also sets standards for scope of practice and provides practice support.

== See also ==
- History of nursing
- History of Nursing in the United Kingdom
- History of nursing in the United States
- Nursing in the United States
