= Alina Lekgetha =

Bantustan Bophuthatswana politician

Alina Molebogeng Nancy Lekgetha, born Alina Molebogeng Nancy Ditheko (27 August 1918 – 2 February 1992) was the Deputy Minister of Health of the Bantustan Bophuthatswana, co-founder of the Bophuthatswana Nursing Council and the main driver in the establishment of the Department of Nursing in the then University of Bophuthatswana (now Mafikeng Campus of the North-West University).

== Early life ==
Alina Molebogeng Nancy Lekgetha was born on 27 August 1918 in Thaba Nchu in the Free State province of South Africa. Her parents raised her as a Methodist. Unlike many members of the Thaba Nchu community, her family did not seek aid from traditional healers in order to honour their Christian faith.

== Personal life ==
She was married to Samuel Molebatsi Lekgetha (date unknown) and had 4 children with him, namely Mokgadi Anna Lekgetha and Lennox Lekgetha. She died on 2 February 1992 in Mmabatho, Mafikeng having devoted her life to nursing education and governance.

== Education ==
As a rural woman who used 'western' medicine, she regarded her role as a bridge between western and indigenous medicine. She trained for nursing at Elim Mission Hospital as well as McCord Hospital in Durban, Kwa-Zulu Natal.

== Career ==
She was appointed as a district nurse in Hammanskraal in 1944 where she became the first nurse to provide health services in the rural area. There were very few health services which were targeted at black women in rural areas at the time. Lekgetha started antenatal care services for the women in the rural area of Hammanskraal making this programme the first of its kind. She started a rural immunisation programme, which was initially only provided by doctors, making her the first nurse to roll out such a programme in the country. She placed much attention on preventative health care and health promotion through initiating clinic committees as well as voluntary health support groups. She was also involved in general comprehensive health care provision at Jubilee Hospital in Hammanskraal.

She was the leader of the local branch of the Bantu Nurses Association at McCord Hospital during the 1940s. The South African Nursing Association (SANA) was racially segregated during most of Lekgetha's career. She was elected as a member of the advisory board for the Bantu people on the South African Nursing Association in 1960, making her the first chairman of the board. Soon after in 1964, she was awarded honorary membership of SANA for her devotion to the nursing profession and public. The Bophutatswana government appointed her as the Deputy Minister of Health and Social Services in November 1987. She co-founded the Baphuthutswana Nursing Association as well as the Bophuthatswana Nursing Council which further motivated her to establish the Department of Nursing Sciences at the University of Bophuthatswana.

During her nursing career, her interests included primary health care, comprehensive health care and midwifery.<ref>Women Marching Into the 21st Century: Wathint' Abafazi, Wathint' Imbokodo. HSRC Press, 2000. page 211</ref>

== Political views ==
She was quoted saying, 'You are not a politician, you work in a political milieu'. She did not believe in compromising patient care during times of protests and was against strike action. However, she often advocated for better working conditions for black nurses in South Africa. She also publicly opposed the Nursing Act (Act No. 69 of 1957) which introduced racially segregated nursing registers. However, she also believed that the racially segregated SANA would compel black nurses to establish their own knowledge systems.

== Honours ==
Other honours include:

- HC Horwood and Shirley Cribb Award (1975)
- Italian International Adelaide Ristori Award (1981)
- Order of the Leopard (1985)

== See also ==
- Midwives in South Africa
- Nursing in South Africa
- 1994 Bophuthatswana crisis
- Victoria Mxenge
