= Certified medical-surgical registered nurse =

Medical profession

Medical-surgical nurses must meet certain eligibility requirements and pass an exam to gain certification as a Certified Medical-Surgical Registered Nurse. The exam currently takes three hours and it has 150 multiple choice questions

Medical-surgical nursing certification (and recertification) is offered by the Medical-Surgical Nursing Certification Board, an organization based in the United States that exists to establish credentialing mechanisms for validating proficiency in medical-surgical nursing. The Medical-Surgical Nursing Certification Board was founded by and is a partner of the Academy of Medical-Surgical Nurses, a specialty nursing organization for medical-surgical nurses. The board partners with the academy to provide an array of programs and services for professional development.
