= Indian nurses association =

Nurses Association

Indian Nurses Association
- Formation: 31 March 2012; 14 years ago
- Type: NGO
- Legal status: Non-Profit Organization
- National President: Liju Vengal
- General Secretary: Vineeth Krishnan
- Kerala state General Secretary: Muhamad shihab
- Kerala state president: Libin Thomas
- Board of directors: Karnataka state president-Renjith scaria
- Website: indiannursesassociation.com

The Indian Nurses Association (INA) is a professional organization and trade union for Registered Nurses in India.

== History ==
The reason for the formation of several newer nursing associations can traced back to 2011. The death of Miss Beena Baby, a Registered Nurse, who committed suicide due staff bullying in a private hospital which had illegal management norms was cited as the reason for the formation of this association. The so-called "bond system" executed by the Mumbai based hospital was an indirect violation against Bonded Labor System (Abolition) Act, 1976. However, nursing regulator in India the Indian Nursing Council could not effectively intervene in matters relating to Nurses in the Service sector because the INC act of 1947 did not have the required legal provisions. Miss Baby's death triggered a public outcry resulting in a strike by 250 nurses.

== Current ==
The most recent contribution of the organisation is the protest organised against hospital managements in the state of Kerala and government authorities for delay in implementing the recommendations of Supreme Court of India. The protests was followed by state level strikes organised by Indian Nurses Association and United Nurses Association.
