= Vital Sign Alert System =

Vital Sign Alert System is an alert system designed by nurses at Sentara Norfolk General Hospital in Norfolk, Virginia. The alert system, which replaced an ineffective early warning scoring (EWS) system, is a unique creation designed specifically to enhance patient monitoring on medical–surgical and step-down nursing units without increasing the nurse's workload.

== Process ==
Hospitalized patients often exhibit signs of deterioration several hours before experiencing cardiopulmonary arrest. These early warning signs frequently go unrecognized by nurses on medical–surgical units, who tend to have large caseloads. Over the past several years, the use of a rapid response team and an early warning scoring (EWS) system has been proposed as a possible solution to the problem.

A rapid response team is a designated group of clinicians with intensive care expertise, who can quickly assemble at a patient's bedside to institute immediate diagnostic and treatment measures in accordance with hospital protocol. Unfortunately, rapid response teams tend to be activated only after a patient's condition has deteriorated and destabilized to the point that emergency transfer to an ICU is required.

EWS systems are based on the premise that a decline in a patient's condition can be detected early through the assessment of an aggregate set of critical physiologic variables. Whereas a single abnormality among these variables may not signal a need for intervention, a combination of two or more irregularities, occurring together, may alert the nurse to a potentially dangerous change in the patient's condition.

== Benefits ==
Theoretically, an EWS system facilitates early detection of life-threatening changes, giving the nurse time to confer with a physician and institute corrective measures to stabilize the patient's condition. Literature reviews conducted over the past decade, however, have found little evidence that EWS systems are effective in reducing adverse events. Furthermore, there is little evidence that such instruments are reliable or valid. EWS systems have been criticized for being too labor-intensive and complex for practical use on medical–surgical units. It's been suggested that the increased nursing workload associated with such systems, as well as general misunderstandings concerning their use and the significance of patients’ scores, may explain the failure of nurses to use them correctly and consistently.
