= Health Care in Canada Survey =

Health survey in Canada

The Health Care in Canada Survey (HCIC) is a comprehensive annual survey of Canadian public and health care providers’ opinions on health care issues. It was conducted annually over the decade 1998–2007, and was developed to provide direction for governments as they work to manage health care reform.

The intent and spirit of the survey was not to provide a report card on the status of the health system, but rather to gauge the need for change, and to provide direction to government on where change is needed, and the options supported by stakeholders of the system. The results from the survey can help guide decision makers, serving as a roadmap to health system reform.

Results from the survey were based on telephone interviews with nationally representative samples of 1,223 members of the Canadian public, 202 doctors, 201 nurses, 202 pharmacists and 201 health managers. The questions were developed by POLLARA Research working in consultation with their partner organizations.

The survey was developed in partnership with a variety of key stakeholders in the healthcare system, working together to provide their experience and perspective on the system. The goal of the partnership was to develop a resource that provides strong direction to decision makers in this time of health care review and reform. Partners included - Association of Canadian Academic Healthcare Organizations, Canadian Healthcare Association, Canadian Home Care Association, Canadian Medical Association, Canadian Nurses Association, Health Charities Coalition of Canada, Université de Montréal - Groupe de recherche en gestion thérapeutique, Merck Frosst Canada Ltd., POLLARA Research, and Rogers Media. The partnership grew from three partners in 1998 to ten in its final year. The partnership represented a broad base of stakeholders in the system, including health care providers, health organizations and institutions, university institutes, the community and homecare sectors, and the innovative pharmaceutical industry.

A number of features made the survey unique. The first is the partnership of a range of stakeholder groups. Secondly, the experiences of the public and health care providers are captured, providing the ability to compare and contrast the reflections of these groups. Third, it was an annual survey, allowing for the tracking of trends over time, highlighting evolving appetites for change, priorities, and preferences.
