= Irish Nurses and Midwives Organisation =

- Nickname: INMO
- Predecessor: Irish Nurse Union
- Merged into: 1985
- Successor: Irish Nurses and Midwife Organisation
- Founded at: Ireland
- Type: Medical Organisation
- Legal status: Active
- Headquarters: Dublin, Ireland
- Members: 43,000
- Official language: English

The Irish Nurses and Midwives Organisation is the largest Irish professional union for nurses and midwives with 40,000 members. It was founded in 1919 after World War I, when a group of Irish nurses and midwives had a meeting in Dublin to discuss the issues in promoting an improvement in wages and advocating for a standard to be set for the conduction of their duties in the medical profession. This new organisation focused on increasing awareness towards tackling problems of pay and pension. They encouraged participation in recognising these changes by recruiting new members and establishing a standard for nursing and midwifery practice through educational initiatives. They were originally known as the ‘Irish Nurses Union’. In the 1930s, they began to promote their campaigns internationally by becoming affiliated with the International Council of Nurses. To this day they are still active and are based at the Whitworth Building in North Brunswick, Dublin.

== Establishment of the INMO ==
The "Irish Nurses and Midwife Organisation" was established in 1919 when a group of twenty nurses and midwives had a meeting in the Dublin Espresso Club to discuss the conditions in the nursing workplace. The decision came from this meeting to establish a trade union in order to improve workplace conditions for employees.

This union advanced to become the first trade union for hospital nurses in the world. The union developed in the interest to improve the policies and conditions of work for nurses and midwives, as well as an improvement in pay. Throughout the early years the INMO successfully grew a following and new members joined their programs created to increase numbers.

“A provisional committee was established at the INU's first meeting in February 1919. Louie Bennett was nominated president and Marie Mortished was nominated secretary”

== INMO Midwives ==
The INU developed a scheme where they implemented a minimum wage of 25 shillings per case for midwives and encouraged midwives to not accept any lower than this. Another step taken to improve workplace standards included publishing the names of the local INU members in the press in an attempt to encourage trade unionist to select from these midwives when their wives required one.

The Irish Nurses Union had a base which provided a postal address for the public to contact the midwives easier. The union further sought for an increase in midwives’ salaries to seventy five pounds per year and a months’ paid leave.

== INMO Nurses ==
“The INU aimed to represent private practice nurses as well as nurses working in poor law hospitals, voluntary working, sanatoria and the jubilee district nursing service” The INU's aim was to provide fairer working conditions for nurses, including increased salaries and decreased weekly working hours.

== 1925 ==
The Irish Nurse Union transformed from a trade union to a professional association in 1925. Changes within the structure of the INU began as membership numbers began to fall. Marie Mortished resigned as secretary of the INU in 1921, and Louis Bennet resigned as president in 1925. In an attempt to increase member numbers, the INU started to run courses such as ‘Housewivery and storekeeping’. “Education courses were partly responsible for increasing the organisations membership” with sixty percent of the new midwives who joined the INO in October 1936 were sourced at a refresher course at Dublin's Coombe Hospital.

With new programs resulting in an increase of members, the Irish Nurse Union evolved into the Irish Nurse Organisation. The programs worked, with there being 220 nurses and 324 midwives in 1930 - an increase from the 437 members in 1929. By 1936 there were 937 members.

The Irish Nurses Organisation began working on an international level in 1931 and became affiliated with the International Council of Nurses (ICN), an affiliation that continues today.

== 1940–1949 ==
With the beginning of World War II in 1939, the Irish Nurses and Midwife Organisation faced many challenges. Ireland remained neutral throughout World War II, but experienced shortages in commodities such as tea, flour and fuel. Shortages and tighter restrictions made it hard for nurses to travel to and from work and increased the price of living by 70 percent between 1942 and 1946.

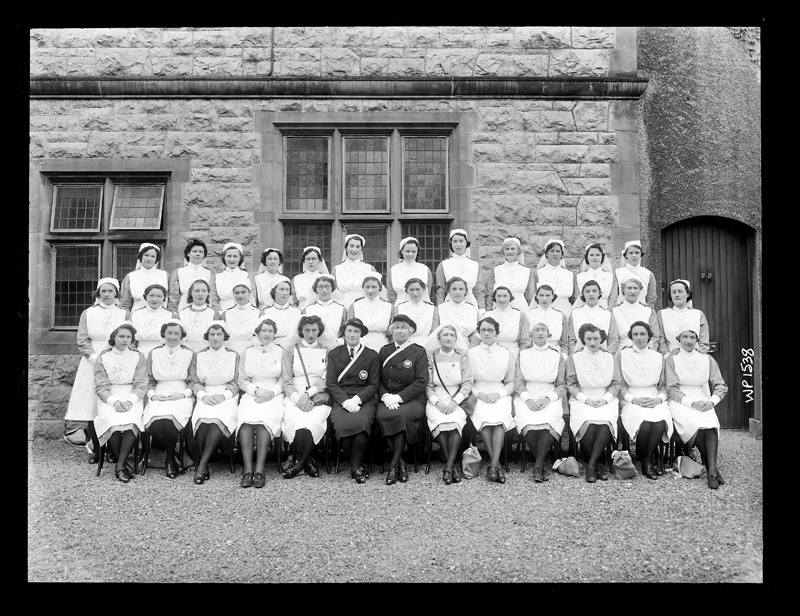
St. John's Ambulance nurses (6400072529)

The demand for nurses increased in countries participating in the war such as England and Western Europe. “Twenty four nurses were employed by the United Nations Relief and Rehabilitation Administration and a team of nurses joined the Irish Red Cross Hospital in St Lo in Normandy”.

Ireland, as a result of increased need for nurses internationally, experienced a shortage of nurses due to this emigration. The INO registered as a legal company under the Trade Union Act in 1941. After this registration the INO became more persistent in their call for the regulation of salaries. The company introduced university level postgraduate courses which increased the INO's popularity among the Irish Catholic community.

Tuberculosis became an imminent problem throughout the 1940s which resulted in a nation-wide campaign for the eradication of tuberculosis. With this campaign came improvements in hospital hygiene conditions.

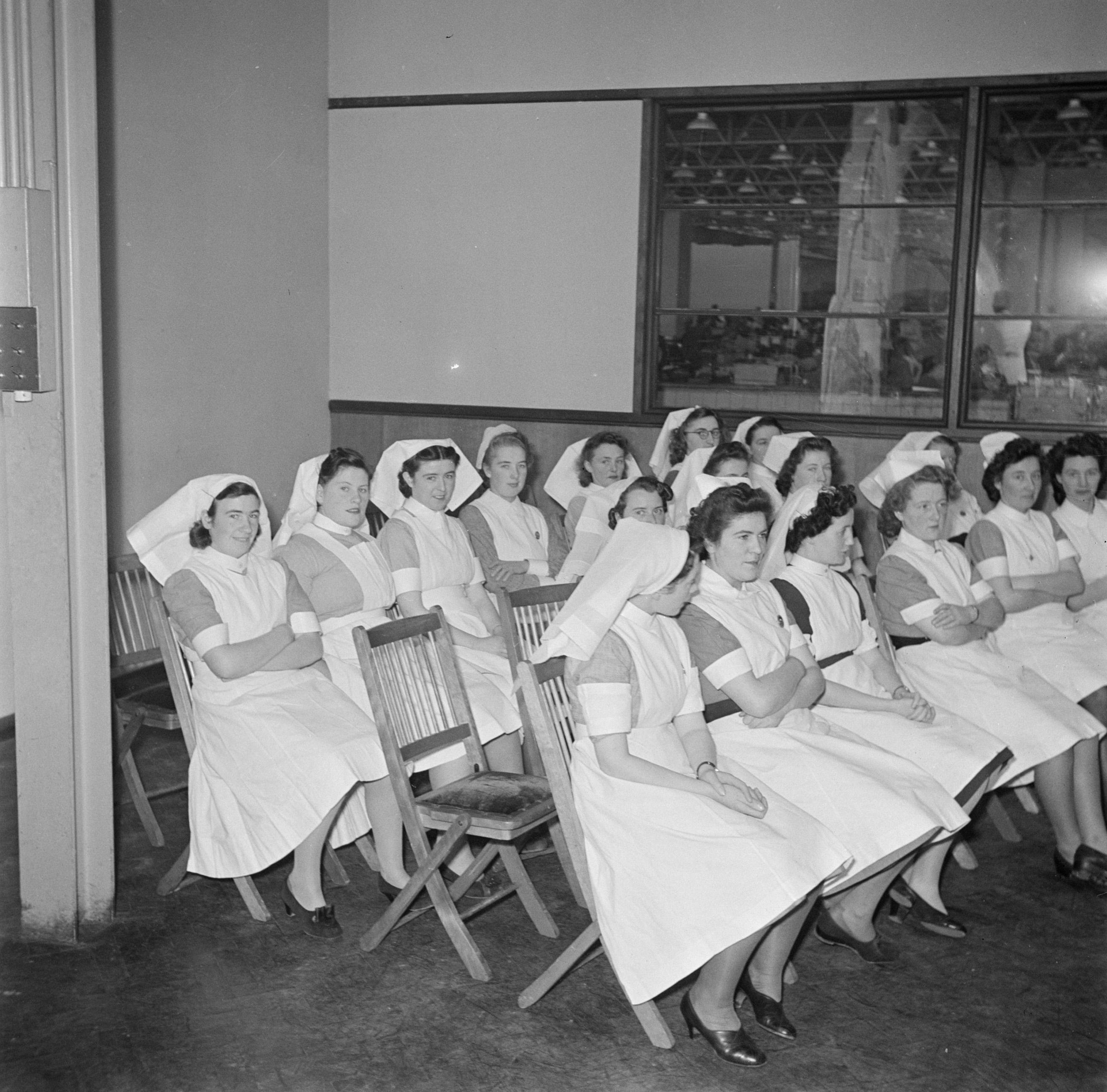
Irish Hospitals Sweepstake - group of nurses 1946

Miss Margret Reidy was appointed nurse supervisor in the department of health in 1948. This was the first appointment of a nurse supervisor in the department of health for the INO.

== 1950–1959 ==
Throughout the 1950s the INO split into different sections. They were formed to group nurses and midwives into categories more specific to their disciplines to allow meetings which were of common importance. The Public Health Nurses section formed in 1951. Mrs P McConville was appointed president. Through the remainder of the decade, the ‘Hospital Nurses’ section and the ‘Jubilee Nurses' and Midwives' section were formed. They were designed to allow staff to “address professional development issues and provide social personal support”.

== 1960–1969 ==
Free trade agreements and foreign investment in Ireland in the 1950s increased the annual growth rates between 1959 and 1973, and as a result began a decade of prosperity for the INO. The union saw an increase in nurse and midwife wages by 4 percent per year. Unemployment rates fell and the trade unions rose.

The organisation began to develop a staff committee in hospitals to solve internal problems throughout this period.

== 1970–1979 ==
Membership of the Irish Nurses Organisation at the beginning of 1970 was 5918. A new 40 hour week was in operation as a requirement for nurses and midwives. This applied to Local Authority and voluntary hospitals from 1 April 1971.

Kyran Lunch was appointed as a full-time Industrial Relations officer in July 1977 to strengthen negotiation activities for the union.

== 1980–1989 ==
The number of members of the Irish Nurses Organisation rose steadily through the years. In 1968 membership was 4499. By 1977, membership had risen to 8055. Throughout the 1980s, government cuts to the health budget affected nurses and midwives work significantly. “some nurses feared their institutions were so short staffed that a patient might die yet remain undiscovered for a number of hours”. The frustration of nurses could be seen in 1989 when 98 percent of nurses voted in favour of a strike.

The headquarters were moved to 11 Fitzwilliam Place during this period. “The Nurses Union of Ireland, the union wholly owned by the Irish Nurses Organisation, was granted full negotiating licence by the High Court” The Irish Nurses Organisation joined the Nurses Union of Ireland in an effort to obtain full negotiating licence which was helt by the Nurses Union of Ireland. This was a long-term goal of the INO to affiliate with the ICTU which was a success. The nurses act was published in 1985.

== 1990–1999 ==
Pay increase at the beginning of the 1990s increased from 2 percent in the 1980s to almost 40 percent in the mid-1990s. The membership of the INO increased from 9000 in the mid-1980s to 23000 in the late 1990s.

With the new implementation of new benefits for members including a salary protection scheme, car insurance, a salary protection scheme and indemnity insurance as well as discounted health insurance rates and discounted rail rickets, the membership of the INO began to rise to 23,000 in the late 1990s.

PJ Madden became the new general secretary in 1998 and Ita O’Dwyer, Kay Craughwell and Anne Cody shared the position as presidents of the INO. In 1999, the INO merged with the Nurses Union of Ireland, which became a Trade Union on 1 November 1990.

Throughout the 1990s, nurses were required to work 39 hours in the week.

== INMO in the 21st century ==
The current membership of the Irish Nurses Organisation is 43,000. The Irish Nurses Organisation established an overseas nurses section as a response to growing concerns surrounding the integration and support of international nurses. In 2006, the Irish Nurses Organisation won the Metro Eireann Media and Multicultural Award as a recognition of the INO's success in integrating overseas nurses and midwives into the Irish healthcare setting.

In March 2007, the Irish Nurses Organisation published a book of essays entitled ‘Forming EU healthcare Policy: A showcase of Irish involvement' to celebrate the INO's achievements of having four representatives holding positions as presidents of European nursing organisations.

In 2009, the Irish Nurses Organisation began sponsoring the education of women nurses in Ethiopia. The following year in 2010, the INO members raised money for the victims of earthquake in Haiti – 500 of which had been nursing students.

== Campaigns ==
The Irish Nurses and Midwives Organisation has been active in campaigns since its establishment. Its campaigns have surrounded issues from safeguarding working rights of migrants and efforts in eradicating racism. In 2005, the INMO staged a campaign of ‘Enough is Enough’ to highlight the lack of accident and emergency departments in hospitals. This campaign encouraged the public to post postcards to the Irish Minister of Health to take action. This campaign was a success as in June 2006 ‘Toward 2016’ was established as a national partnership deal which promised a 10-year framework to plan social and infrastructure developments.

The INMO became the first organisation to support the ‘turn off the red light’ campaign in 2011. This campaign was ultimately successful, with the purchase of sex becoming outlawed in Ireland under the Criminal Law (Sexual Offences) Act of 2017.

The INMO attempted to mobilise public opinion behind its patient advocacy drive, and in conjunction with the Irish Patients Association Cystic fibrosis Ireland and the Irish Medical Organisation, launched a campaign known as the ‘Patients First’ campaign in 2014.

The Irish Nurses and Midwife Organisation campaigned its support of same-sex marriage in Ireland in 2015 which also became a success. In 2016, the INMO campaigned for a human rights approach to the health care system funded by general taxation, which was established by the state in 2016 with the launch of the all- party Slaintecare Report in 2017.

On 30 January 2019, the Irish Nurses and Midwife Organisation called a strike as a dispute over pay conditions. The members of the organisation withdrew all non essential services for twenty four hours. The aim of this strike was to ask for a twelve percent increase to pay across the board. This strike was received by the public with general support in their attempt to achieve higher pay and to ensure a safer and more efficient health service.

== See also ==
- List of nursing organizations
