= Judith Shamian =

Canadian nurse

Judith Shamian is a Canadian nurse who served as president of the International Council of Nurses (ICN) from 2013-2017 before being succeeded by Annette Kennedy. She was elected to the position at the ICN Quadrennial Congress at Melbourne, Australia in May 2013. Shamian has published and spoken on nursing-related topics internationally.

Shamian has worked in consultancy roles in China, Barbados, the British Virgin Islands, Hungary, the United States, Israel and the University of Botswana.

Shamian obtained her PhD from the Case Western Reserve, Cleveland, Ohio and a Master in Public Health from New York University alongside a Baccalaurate in Community Nursing from Concordia University in Montreal.

She was also the president of the Victorian Order of Nurses and the Canadian Nurses Association.
