= Midwives in South Africa =

Midwives in South Africa are nurses who focus on the care of pregnant women and the delivery of babies. Midwives have the ability to work independently in cases of healthy pregnancies and problem-free deliveries; however, they can refer patients to gynaecologists or obstetricians when complications are diagnosed. The majority of pregnant women in South Africa use the public healthcare system, and most of this care is provided by midwives.

== History ==
The first registered nurse-midwife in the world was Sister Louisa Jane Barrett, who received training in Kimberley, South Africa, in 1891. There is almost no documentation as to who attended to births in South Africa prior to commencement of Dutch colonisation in 1652. From 1652, midwives could function independently and were certified and licensed. Between 1948 and 1991, the apartheid system of racial segregation in South Africa influenced the way that nursing training was structured and organised.

=== Restrictions ===
In the 1960s, most women in South Africa delivered in hospitals as it was believed that this was the best place for birth. Additionally, hospitals in both the public and private sector did not support independent midwives by allowing them to use their facilities. Midwives then assumed the positions of 'obstetric nurses', where they would work in healthcare facilities under the guidance of obstetricians.

=== National Health System (1994-present) ===
In 1994, the National Health System implemented a primary healthcare approach to improve access to healthcare services by disadvantaged communities. Along with the other United Nations member states, in 2000, South Africa committed to help achieve a set of world development goals for 2015 called the Millennium Development Goals. South Africa did not achieve the Millennium Goals for maternal health. In the subsequent years, different policies and programmes have been implemented to improve maternal care and child mortality. A new, integrated inter-professional training model is also being attempted by health practitioners to improve outcomes in maternal care.

== Licensure ==
In South Africa the midwifery profession is regulated under the Nursing Act, Act No 3 of 2005. The South African Nursing Council (SANC) is the regulatory body of midwifery in South Africa. Training includes aspects of midwifery, general nursing, community nursing and psychiatry, and can be achieved as either a four-year degree or a four-year diploma.

=== Advanced Diploma in Midwifery ===
The primary purpose of this qualification is to produce competent midwives who will provide scientific, comprehensive, safe and quality midwifery care to patients, families and communities within the legal and ethical framework. On successful completion of this qualification, the learner is eligible to register with the SANC as a midwife. All assessments are conducted in line with the assessment policy of the Regulations Relating to the Accreditation of Institutions as Nursing Education Institutions (NEI).This qualification allows international employability.

=== Postgraduate Diploma in Midwifery ===
The purpose of this qualification is to gain knowledge and expertise in midwifery as a speciality, including a systematic survey of thinking, practice and research methods in the field of midwifery. Aims include screening, preventing disease, injury, complications, screening, appropriate management and referral of patients to appropriate healthcare providers. All assessments should be aligned with the Assessment Policy of the Nursing/Midwifery Education Institution (NEI). The Postgraduate Diploma articulates with a master's degree in Nursing at NQF level 9. This qualification allows international employability.

=== Bachelor’s Degree in Nursing and Midwifery ===
This qualification aims at training competent Professional Nurse and Midwife practitioners who will have the ability to act in a wide range of healthcare service environments. On successful completion of this qualification, the learner is eligible for registration with the relevant statutory body (currently the SANC) as a Professional Nurse and Midwife. Successful registration will license a nurse to practise as a Professional Nurse and Midwife. All assessments should be conducted in line with the assessment policy of the NEI. This qualification allows international employability.

== Areas of Practice ==
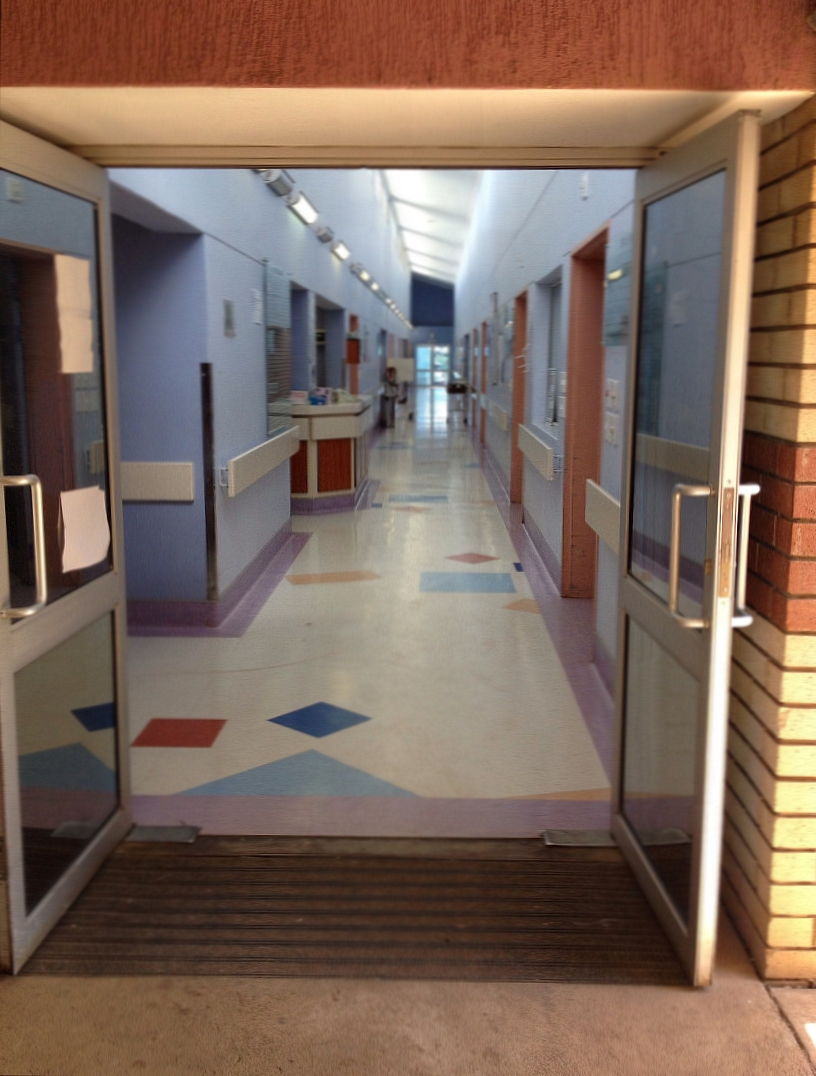
Inside of maternity ward in St. Patrick's Hospital on the Eastern Cape.

Primary maternity services are provided by midwives in the public sector as part of the South African National Health Plan. Midwives in the public sector work interdependently with medical doctors in secondary and tertiary healthcare settings.

In the private sector, midwives may be employed by a hospital and work interdependently with an obstetrician where the midwife only provides care during delivery; or practise independently and only require assistance from an obstetrician for emergencies.

Midwives are not allowed to prescribe medications, such as magnesium sulphate and oxytocin which are used to treat pre-eclampsia and postpartum haemorrhage, respectively. Midwives are dependent on medical practitioners for these. However, due to the shortage of medical practitioners, some midwives may take the risk of practising outside their scope of practice by prescribing medications.

== Present shortages ==
Since 2007, there has been a shortage of midwives in South Africa. The shortage of midwives in the management of pregnant women in the private sector is perceived as one of the reasons for the high rate of deliveries conducted by caesarean section. The collaboration of midwives and obstetricians in the management of pregnant women would be beneficial to maternity care once critical impediments are addressed in order to achieve such a partnership. There have been reported improvements to the cognitive knowledge of midwives in the Eastern Cape who have completed the Maternal Care manual.

Between 1996 and 2005, South Africa produced almost 42% fewer midwives and nursing graduates from national education institutions. There are few qualifying midwives and many young qualified midwives do not stay in practice. Another hindrance is the lack of recognition of post-basic qualifications. Additionally, unlike medical registrars, midwives have to pay for their own studies, need to be on leave to attend lectures and do not receive 'specialist' recognition for their additional skills set. These midwives usually leave the clinical workplace to become administrators, where they are more likely to earn a higher salary and be professionally promoted.

== Ababelithisi midwife tradition ==
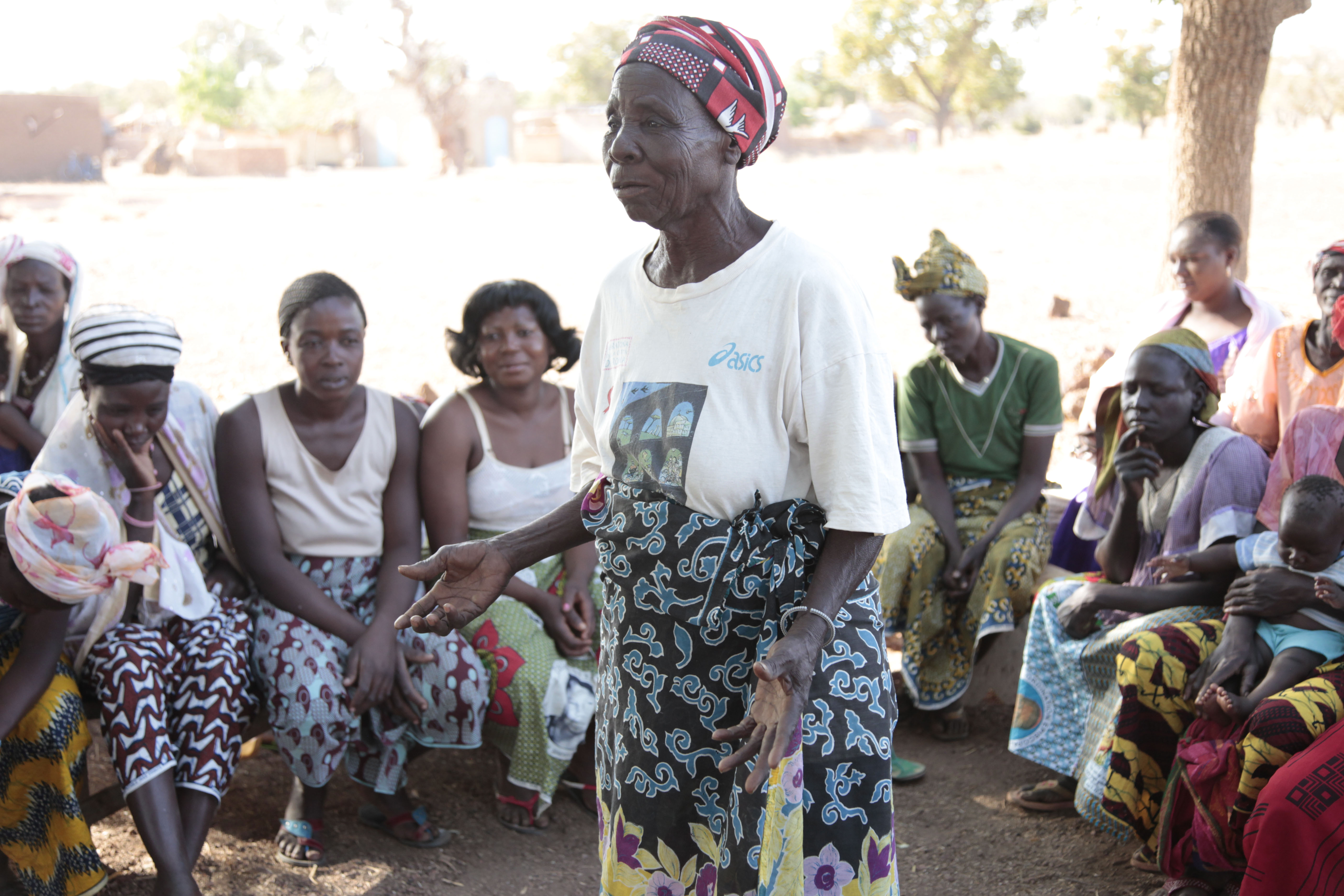
A traditional midwife, or ababelithisi, having a community discussion.

The traditional birth attendant, often referred to as an ababelithisi, has played an integral role in African medicine for centuries. There is still widespread use of traditional midwives due to spiritual beliefs and the inability to access formal healthcare services. The majority of midwives are located in rural areas and informal settlements. Ababelithisi are usually elderly women who have been midwives for decades and are well esteemed in their communities for their obstetric and ritual expertise. They manage antenatal issues and assist pregnant women during deliveries. They are also responsible for the ritual bathing of the mother, disposal of the placentas, provision of healing medicines and traditional massage after delivery. In cases of difficult labour or complications, a traditional healer or inyanga may act as a consultant or assistant.

Ababelithisi may provide advice on various aspects of postpartum care, such as, cord care, breastfeeding, marriage, contraception and fertility. The criteria for women aspiring to be traditional midwives include having two children of their own as well as training over a period of 15 to 20 years before they can assume this respected title. Their services are free; however, donations in the form of gifts are usually given.

=== Governmental recognition ===
In 1977, the World Health Organization (WHO) formally recognised the importance of collaborating with traditional healers (including traditional midwives). The WHO's 2001 survey of the legal status of traditional and complementary/alternative medicine revealed that 61% of the 44 African nations surveyed had legal statutes regarding traditional medicine and not all national policies had been implemented. Increasing efforts have since been made to formally include traditional healers in primary healthcare, including around HIV/AIDS care and prevention. In South Africa, the “Traditional Health Practitioners Bill of 2003” was drafted. Certain sections of the Traditional Health Practitioners Act, Act No. 35 of 2004, came into operation on 13 January 2006. Efforts are ongoing to develop a pharmacopoeia of traditional medicines. The WHO Traditional Medicine Strategy 2014–2023 was developed and launched in response to the World Health Assembly's resolution on traditional medicine (WHA62.13). The strategy aims to support member states in implementing action plans and policies that will strengthen the role that traditional medicine plays in keeping populations healthy.

== Regulatory Bodies ==
- The South African Nursing Council, which controls midwifery education and practice.
- Democratic Nursing Organisation of South Africa (DENOSA), which represents both nurses and midwives, is now an affiliate of international bodies such as the
- International Council of Nurses.

== See also ==
- Natural childbirth
- Traditional birth attendant
- Healthcare in South Africa
- Democratic Nursing Organisation of South Africa
