= Ann Thomas Callahan =

Canadian Cree nurse (1935–2023)

- Born: 1935; Peepeekisis Cree Nation
- Died: 16 January 2023
- Organization: Canadian Indigenous Nurses Association

Ann Thomas Callahan (c. 1935 – 16 January 2023) was a Canadian Cree nurse. She was one of the first Indigenous graduates of the Winnipeg General Hospital's nursing school.

== Early life ==
Callahan was born on the Peepeekisis Cree Nation in Saskatchewan to Nora and John Thomas, and was granted the spirit name "Wapiskisiw Piyésís" (meaning White Birdwoman) by an elder at age four. She attended the File Hills Residential School, and went to Manitoba for secondary school at Birtle Indian Residential.

== Career ==
Callahan was one of the first Indigenous graduates of the Winnipeg General Hospital's nursing school, convocating in 1958. She was head nurse of a gynecology ward before joining a new organization, Continuing Care for People in Need, founded in 1973 to support the health needs of those in Winnipeg's core. She also taught in the nursing program at Red River College, retiring in 1996. After retirement she attended university, achieving a bachelor's degree focused on psychology and a masters in interdisciplinary studies. She wrote her masters thesis on "the reclamation and retention of Aboriginal spirituality of Indian Residential School Survivors", specifically considering alumni of her own former school, File Hills.

== Legacy ==
Callahan was the namesake of a new critical services building at the Health Sciences Centre, which at the time of its opening in 2007 was the "largest health capital project in Manitoba history". She was also involved in the creation of the Registered Nurses of Canadian Indian Ancestry, now called the Canadian Indigenous Nurses Association, considered the country's first professional organization for Indigenous peoples. The association presented her with a Lifetime Achievement Award in 2014.
