= Labour in India =

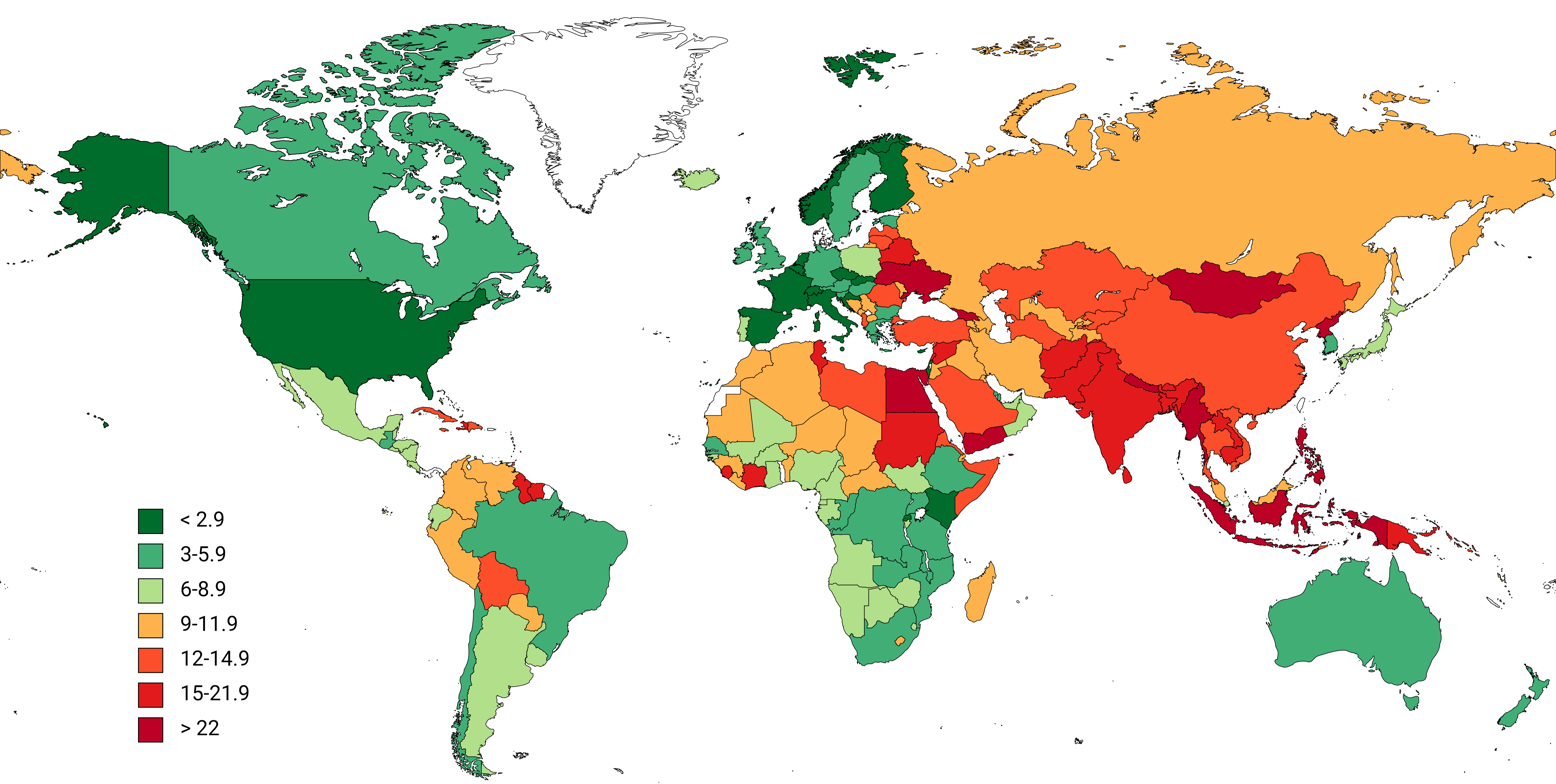
Deaths due to long working hours per 100,000 people (15+), joint study conducted by World Health Organization and International Labour Organization in 2016

Average annual hours actually worked per worker in OECD countries from 1970 to 2020

Labour in India refers to employment in the economy of India. In 2020, there were around 476.67 million workers in India, the second largest workforce after China. Out of which, agriculture industry consist of 41.19%, industry sector consist of 26.18% and service sector consist 32.33% of total labour force. Of these over 94 percent work in unincorporated, unorganised enterprises ranging from pushcart vendors to home-based diamond and gem polishing operations. The organised sector includes workers employed by the government, state-owned enterprises and private sector enterprises. In 2008, the organised sector employed 27.5 million workers, of which 17.3 million worked for government or government owned entities.

The Human Rights Measurement Initiative finds that India is only doing 43.9% of what should be possible at its level of income for the right to work. Due to lax labor rules that apply to all businesses in India, laborers are frequently exploited by their bosses in contrast to developed nations. According to the International Labour Organization (ILO), Indians have one of the longest average work weeks when compared with the ten largest economies globally. The average working hours in India are approximately 47.7 hours per week. This places India seventh on the list of countries that work the most globally. Despite having one of the longest working hours, India has one of the lowest work productivity levels in the world.

== Labour structure in India ==
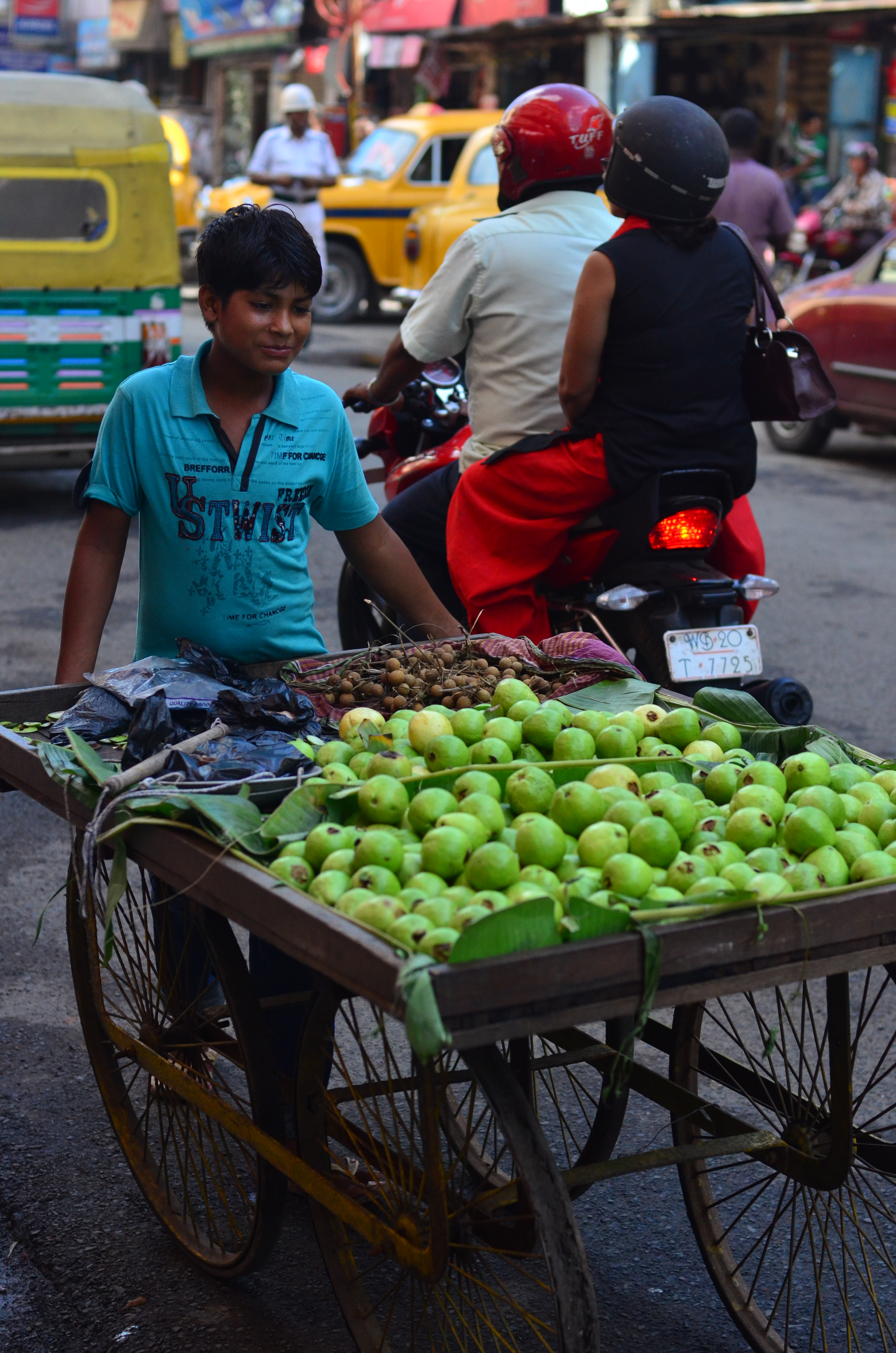
The vast majority of work in India is in the informal sector. Pictured above is a child fruit seller in Kolkata.

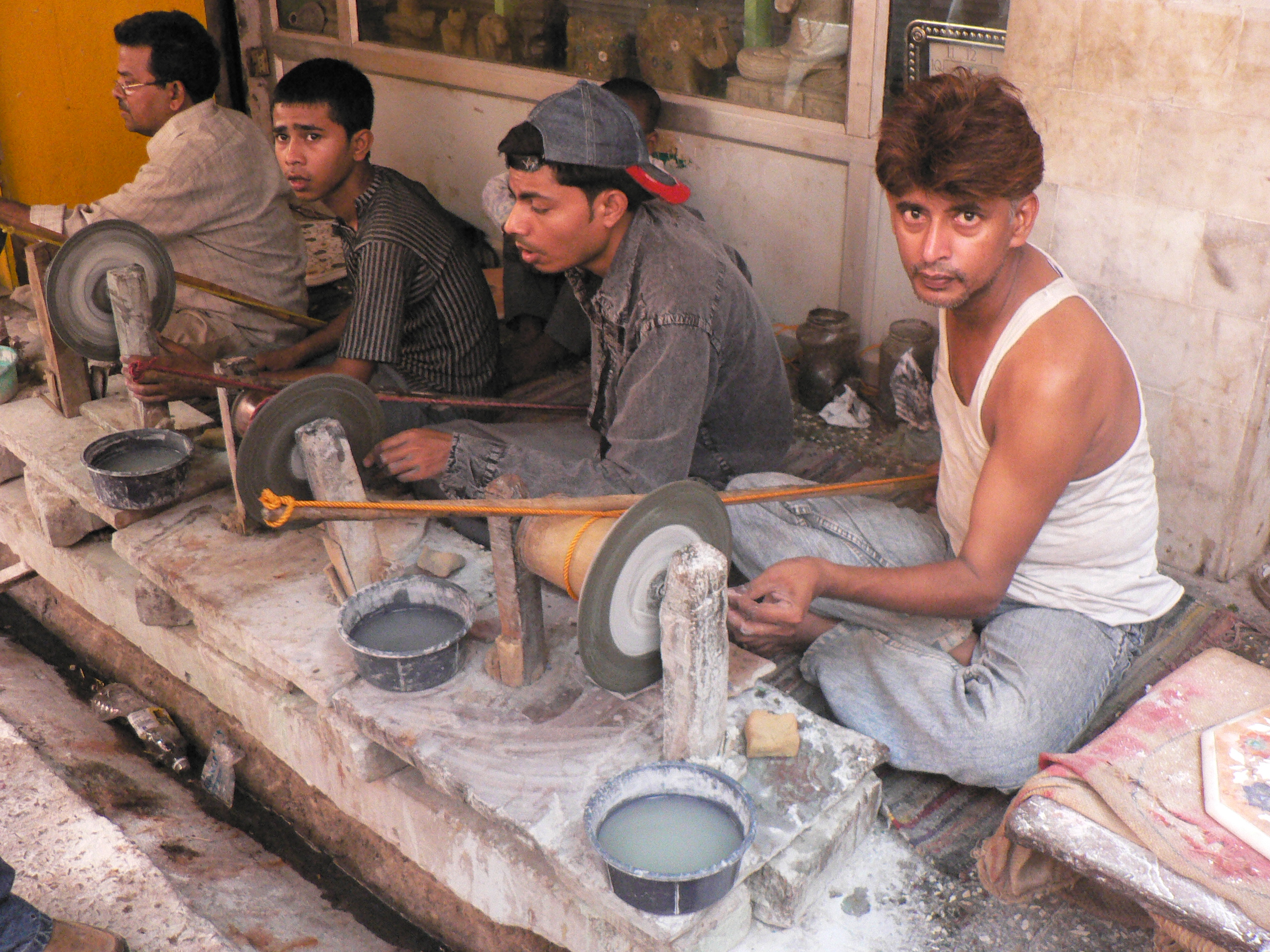
Workers at a handicraft manufacturing enterprise, Uttar Pradesh

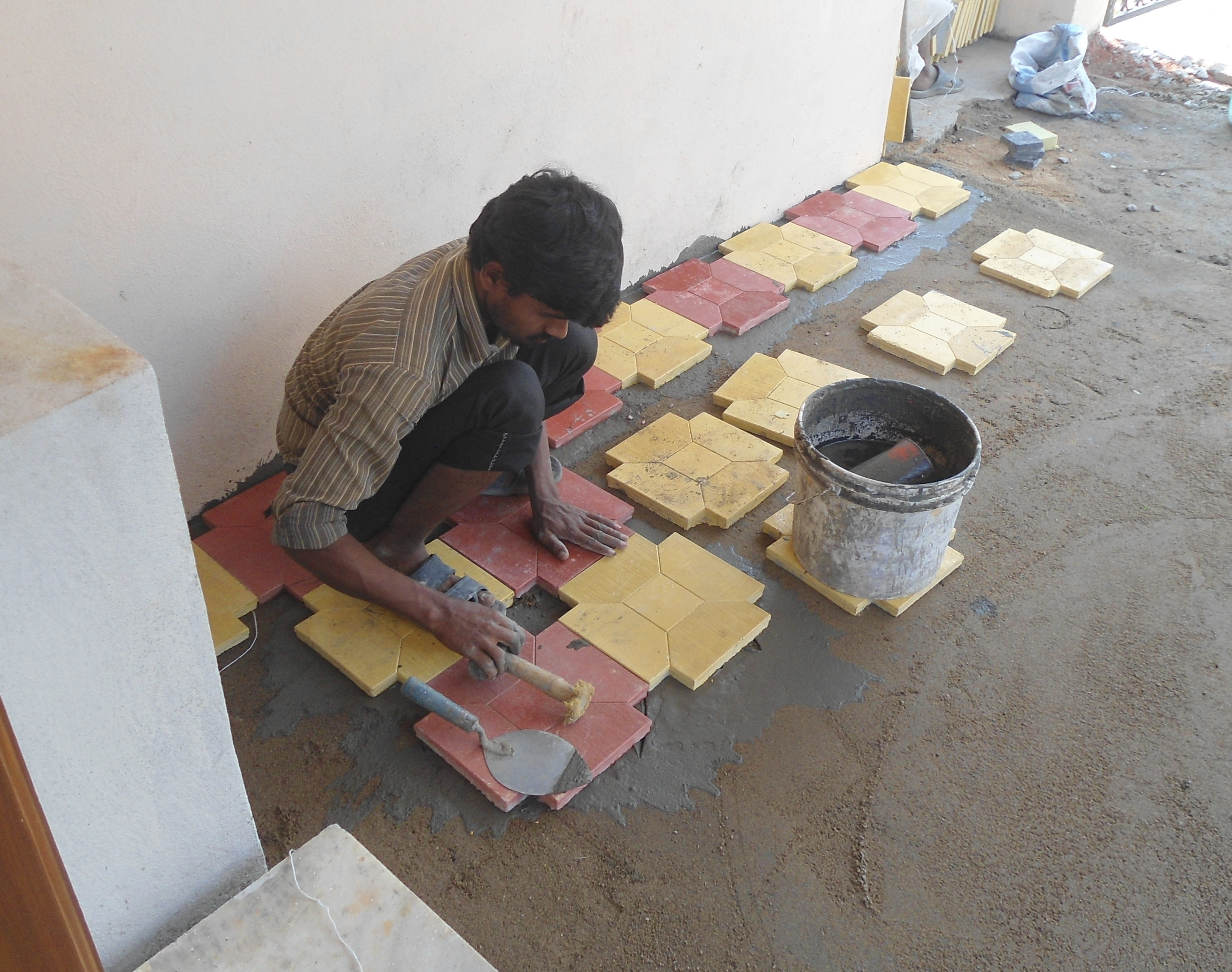
Flooring work at a portico in Hyderabad

Over 94 percent of India's working population is part of the unorganised sector. In local terms, organised sector or formal sector in India refers to licensed organisations, that is, those who are registered and pay GST. These include the publicly traded companies, incorporated or formally registered entities, corporations, factories, shopping malls, hotels, and large businesses. Unorganised sector, also known as own account enterprises, refers to all unlicensed, self-employed or unregistered economic activity such as owner-staffed general stores, handicrafts and handloom workers, rural traders, farmers, etc.

India's Ministry of Labour, in its 2008 report, classified the unorganised labour in India into four groups. This classification categorized India's unorganised labour force by occupation, nature of employment, specially distressed categories and service categories. The unorganised occupational groups include small and marginal farmers, landless agricultural labourers, sharecroppers, fishermen, those engaged in animal husbandry, beedi rolling, labeling and packing, building and construction workers, leather workers, weavers, artisans, salt workers, workers in brick kilns and stone quarries, workers in saw mills, and workers in oil mills. A separate category based on nature of employment includes attached agricultural labourers, bonded labourers, migrant workers, contract and casual labourers. Another separate category dedicated to distressed unorganised sector includes toddy tappers, scavengers, carriers of head loads, drivers of animal driven vehicles, loaders and unloaders. The last unorganised labour category includes service workers such as midwives, domestic workers, barbers, vegetable and fruit vendors, newspaper vendors, pavement vendors, hand cart operators, and the unorganised retail.

The unorganised sector has low productivity and offers lower wages. Even though it accounted for over 94 percent of workers, India's unorganised sector created just 57 percent of India's national domestic product in 2006, or about nine fold less per worker than the organised sector. According to Bhalla, the productivity gap sharply worsens when rural unorganised sector is compared to urban unorganised sector, with gross value added productivity gap spiking an additional two to four fold depending on occupation. Some of lowest income jobs are in the rural unorganised sectors. Poverty rates are reported to be significantly higher in families where all working age members have only worked the unorganised sector throughout their lives.

Agriculture, dairy, horticulture and related occupations alone employ 41.49 percent of labour in India.

About 30 million workers are migrant workers, most in agriculture, and local stable employment is unavailable for them.

India's National Sample Survey Office in its 67th report found that unorganised manufacturing, unorganised trading/retail and unorganised services employed about 10 percent each of all workers nationwide, as of 2010. It also reported that India had about 58 million unincorporated non-Agriculture enterprises in 2010.

In the organised private sector with more than 10 employees per company, the biggest employers in 2008 were manufacturing at 5 million; social services at 2.2 million, which includes private schools and hospitals; finance at 1.1 million which includes bank, insurance and real estate; and agriculture at 1 million. India had more central and state government employees in 2008, than employees in all private sector companies combined. If state-owned companies and municipal government employees were included, India had a 1.8:1 ratio between public sector employees and private sector employees. In terms of gender equality in employment, male to female ratio was 5:1 in government and government owned enterprises; private sector fared better at 3:1 ratio. Combined, counting only companies with more than 10 employees per company, the organised public and private sector employed 5.5 million women and 22 million men.

Given its natural rate of population growth and aging characteristics, India is adding about 13 million new workers every year to its labour pool. India's economy has been adding about 8 million new jobs every year predominantly in low paying, unorganised sector. The remaining 5 million youth joining the ranks of poorly paid partial employment, casual labour pool for temporary infrastructure and real estate construction jobs, or in many cases, being unemployed.

== Labour relations ==
About seven per cent of the 400 million-strong workforce were employed in the formal sector (comprising government and corporates) in 2000 contributing 60 per cent of the nominal GDP of the nation. The Trade Unions Act 1926 provided recognition and protection for a nascent India In 1997, India had about 59,000 trade unions registered with the government of India. Of these only 9,900 unions filed income and expenditure reports and claimed to represent 7.4 million workers. The state of Kerala at 9,800 trade unions had the highest number of registered unions, but only few filed income and expenditure reports with the government of India. The state of Karnataka had the fastest growth in number of unions between the 1950s to 1990s.

In 1995, India had 10 central federations of trade unions, namely (arranged by number of member unions in 1980): INTUC, CITU, BMS, AITUC, HMS, NLO, UTUC, AIUTUC, NFITU and TUCC. Each federation had numerous local trade union affiliates, with the smallest TUCC with 65 and INTUC with 1604 affiliated unions. By 1989, BMS had become India's largest federation of unions with 3,117 affiliated unions, while INTUC remained the largest federation by combined number of members at 2.2 million. The largest federation of trade unions, INTUC, represents about 0.5% of India's labour force in organised sector and unorganised sector. In 2010, over 98% of Indian workers did not belong to any trade unions and were not covered by any collective bargaining agreements.

=== Labour relations during 1950–1990 ===
A number of economists (e.g.: Fallon and Lucas, 1989; Besley and Burgess, 2004) have studied the industrial relations climate in India, with a large number of studies focusing on state-level differences in India's Industrial Disputes Act. Some studies (e.g.: Besley and Burges, 2004) purport to show that pro-worker amendments to the Industrial Disputes Act have had a negative impact on industrial output and employment - as well as on poverty. However these studies have faced serious criticism on the grounds that the data used are misinterpreted, and that the results are not robust with respect to standard econometric tests.

Between 1950 and 1970, labour disputes nearly tripled in India, from an average of 1000 labour disputes per year, to an average of 3000 labour disputes per year. The number of labour relations issues within a year peaked in 1973 at 3,370 labour disputes. The number of workers who joined labour disputes within the same year, and stopped work, peaked in 1979, at 2.9 million workers. The number of lost man-days from labour relation issues peaked in 1982 at 74.6 million lost man-days, or about 2.7% of total man-days in organised sector. While the 1970s experienced a spike in labour unions and disputes, a sudden reduction in labour disputes was observed during 1975–1977, when Indira Gandhi, then prime minister, declared an emergency and amongst other things suspended many civil rights including the worker's right to strike.

This is a table showing trend of organised Labour Force.

Year	Public Sector (in millions)	Private Sector (in millions)	Live (Unemployment) Register (in millions)
1975	13.63	6.79	9.78
1980	15.48	7.40	17.84
1985	17.68	7.37	30.13
1990	19.06	7.68	36.30
1995	19.43	8.51	37.43
2000	19.14	8.65	42.00
2005	18.19	8.77	41.47
2010	17.55	11.45	40.17

=== Labour relations during 1990-2000 ===
Union membership is concentrated in the organised sector, and in the early 1990s total membership was about 9 million. Many unions are affiliated with regional or national federations, the most important of which are the Indian National Trade Union Congress, the All India Trade Union Congress, the Centre of Indian Trade Unions, the Hind Mazdoor Sabha, and the Bharatiya Mazdoor Sangh. Politicians have often been union leaders, and some analysts believe that strikes and other labour protests are called primarily to further the interests of political parties rather than to promote the interests of the work force.

The government recorded 1,825 strikes and lockouts in 1990. As a result, 24.1 million workdays were lost, 10.6 million to strikes and 13.5 million to lockouts. More than 1.3 million workers were involved in these labour disputes. The number and seriousness of strikes and lockouts have varied from year to year. However, the figures for 1990 and preliminary data from 1991 indicate declines from levels reached in the 1980s, when between 33 and 75 million workdays per year were lost because of labour disputes. In 1999, the government of India recorded about 927 strikes and lockouts, or about half of those for 1990. The number of lost man-days were about the same for 1999 and 1991, even though Indian economic output and number of workers had grown significantly over the 1990s.

=== Labour relations during 2000–2011 ===
Between 2004 and 2011, India has experienced a decline in unionised labour. The number of labour disputes has dropped to 400 annually over the same period, compared with over 1,000 in the 1990s. The annual number of man-days lost to labour disputes in early 1990s averaged around 27 million; by 2010, while Indian economy has grown significantly and Indian labour force has expanded, the average number of man-days lost has dropped by about 30%. The downward trend continues both in terms of number of disputes and lost man-days per dispute. For example, India experienced 249 disputes in the first 5 months of 2010, and 101 disputes in 2012 over the same period.

== Unorganised labour issues ==
Many issues plague unorganised labour. India's Ministry of Labour has identified significant issues with migrant, home or bondage labourers and child labour.

=== Migrant labours ===
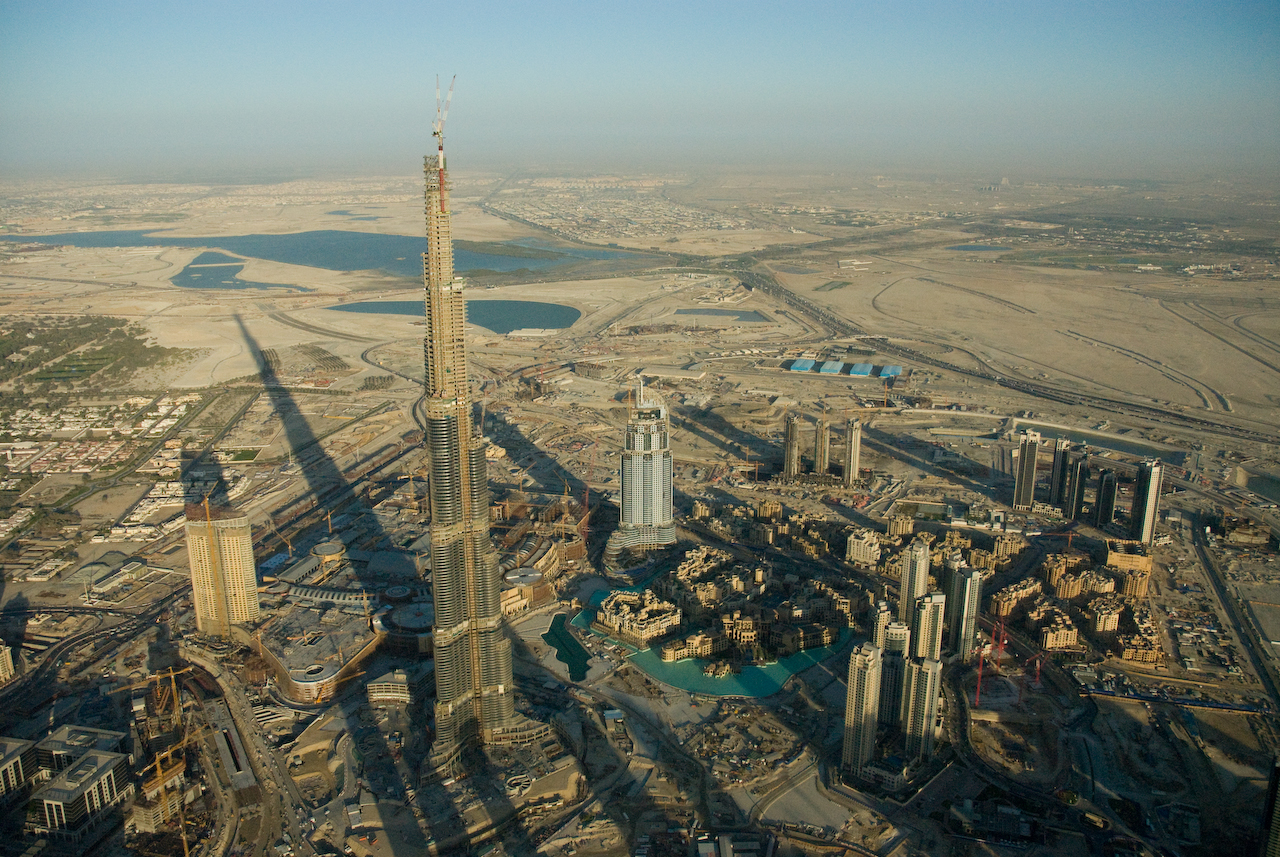
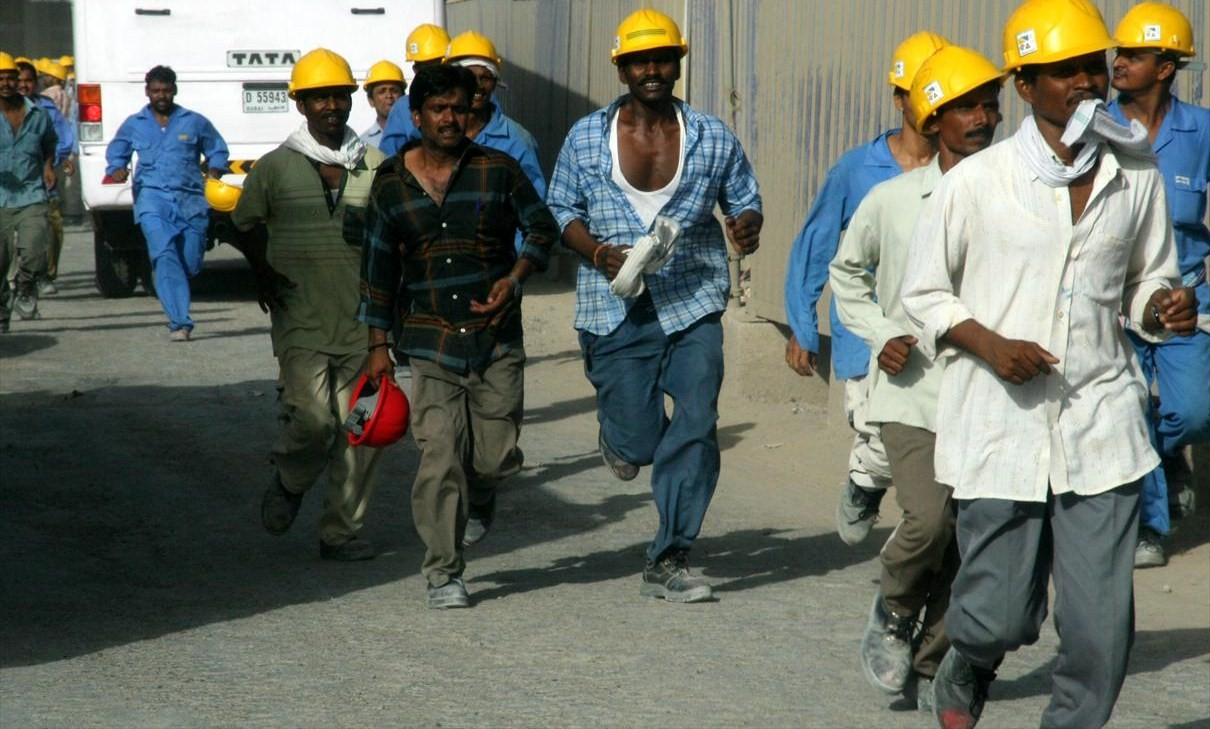
Migrant skilled and unskilled labourers of India constitute about 40 to 85 percent of low wage working population in many parts of the Middle East. They are credited to having built many of the notable buildings in the Arab countries, including the Burj Khalifa in Dubai (above). Various claims of poor living conditions and labour abuse have been reported.

India has two broad groups of migrant labourers - one that migrates to temporarily work overseas, and another that migrates domestically on a seasonal and work available basis.

There has been a substantial flow of people from Bangladesh and Nepal to India over recent decades in search of better work. Researchers at the Overseas Development Institute found that these migrant workers are often subject to harassment, violence, and discrimination during their journeys at their destinations and when they return home.

Domestic migrant workers have been estimated to be about 4.2 million - (Domestic workers, not domestic migrant workers). These workers range from full-time to part-time workers, temporary or permanent workers. They are typically employed for remuneration in cash or kind, in any household through any agency or directly, to do the household work, but do not include any member of the family of an employer. Some of these work exclusively for a single employer, while others work for more than one employer. Some are live-in workers, while some are seasonal. The employment of these migrant workers is typically at the will of the employer and the worker, and compensation varies.

==== Migrant labourers in Kerala ====
Migrant labourers in Kerala, India's southernmost state, are a significant economic force in the state; there were around 2.5 million internal migrants in Kerala according to a 2013 study by the Gulati Institute of Finance and Taxation. Every year, the migrant worker population in Kerala increases by 2.35 lakh (235,000) people. The study, based on long-distance trains terminating in Kerala, does not cover migrants from the neighbouring states who use other modes of transport. Assuming that the estimation is rigorous and extrapolating it, taking into account the net annual addition, possible growth in migration rate, as well as accounting for the migration from the neighbouring states, Kerala is likely to have 3.5 to 4 million inter-state migrant workers in 2017. Despite their importance and despite many of them praising the state for its welfare schemes and environment, they are often ignored in comparison and suffer from comparatively poor living conditions.

==== Migrant workers in the Middle East ====
About 4 million Indian-origin labourers are migrant workers in the Middle East alone. They are credited to have been the majority of workers who built many of Dubai, Bahrain, Qatar and Persian Gulf modern architecture, including the Burj Khalifa, the tallest building in world's history which opened in January 2010. These migrant workers are attracted by better salaries (typically US$2 to 5 per hour), possibility of earning overtime pay, and opportunity to remit funds to support their families in India. The Middle East-based migrant workers from India remitted about US$20 billion in 2009. Once the projects are over, they are required to return at their own expenses, with no unemployment or social security benefits. In some cases, labour abuses such as unpaid salaries, unsafe work conditions and poor living conditions have been claimed.

==== Indian migrant workers during the COVID-19 pandemic ====
Indian migrant workers during the COVID-19 pandemic have faced multiple hardships. With factories and workplaces shut down due to the lockdown imposed in the country, millions of migrant workers had to deal with the loss of income, food shortages and uncertainty about their future. Following this, many of them and their families went hungry. Thousands of them then began walking back home, with no means of transport due to the lockdown. Due to the lockdown, more than 300 deaths were reported till 5 May, with reasons ranging from starvation, suicides, exhaustion, road and rail accidents, police brutality and denial of timely medical care. Among the reported deaths, most were among the marginalised migrants and labourers. 80 died while travelling back home on the Shramik Special trains, in the one month since their launch. In response, the Central and State Governments took various measures to help them, and later arranged transport for them.

=== Debt bondage ===
Bonded labour is a forced relationship between an employer and an employee, where the compulsion is derived from outstanding debt. Often the interest accrues at a rate that is so high that the bonded labour lasts a very long periods of time, or indefinitely. Sometimes, the employee has no options for employment in the organised or unorganised sectors of India, and prefers the security of any employment including one offered in bonded labour form. While illegal, bonded labour relationships may be reinforced by force, or they may continue from custom. Once an employee enters into a bonded relationships, they are characterised by asymmetry of information, opportunity, no time to search for alternative jobs and high exit costs.

Estimates of bonded labour in India vary widely, depending on survey methods, assumptions and sources. Official Indian government estimates claim a few hundred thousand labourers are bonded labourers; while a 1978 estimate placed bonded labour in India to be 2.62 million. The 32nd National Sample Survey Organisation survey in India estimated 343,000 bonded labourers in 16 major states, of which 285,379 were located and freed by 1996. The major employment sectors for debt bonded labour include: agriculture, stone quarries, brick kilns, religious and temple workmen, pottery, rural weaving, fishing, forestry, betel and bidi workers, carpet, illegal mining and fireworks. Child labour has been found in family debt bonded situations. In each survey, debt bonded labourers have been found in unorganised, unincorporated sector.

India enacted Bonded Labour System Abolition Act (1976) to prohibit any and all forms of bonded labour practice, to protect the bonded labour, and to criminalize individuals and entities that hire, keep or seek bonded labour.

=== Child labour ===
According to data from Census year 2011, number of child labourers is 10.1 million, 5.6 million boys and 4.5 million girls in India. Total of 152 million children, 64 million girls and 88 million boys are estimated to be in child labour globally, for almost one in ten of all children worldwide. Poverty, lack of schools, poor education infrastructure and growth of unorganised economy are considered as the most important causes of child labour in India.

Article 24 of India's constitution prohibits child labour, but only in factories, mines or hazardous employment. The Indian Penal Code, the Juvenile Justice (care and protection) of Children Act-2000, and the Child Labour (Prohibition and Abolition) Act-1986 provide a basis in law to identify, prosecute and stop child labour in India. Nevertheless, child labour is observed in almost all unorganised, small scale, informal sectors of the Indian economy.

Scholars suggest inflexibility and structure of India's labour market, size of informal economy, legal hurdles preventing industries from scaling up and lack of modern manufacturing technologies are major macroeconomic factors encouraging demand for and acceptability of child labour.

== Labour laws in India ==
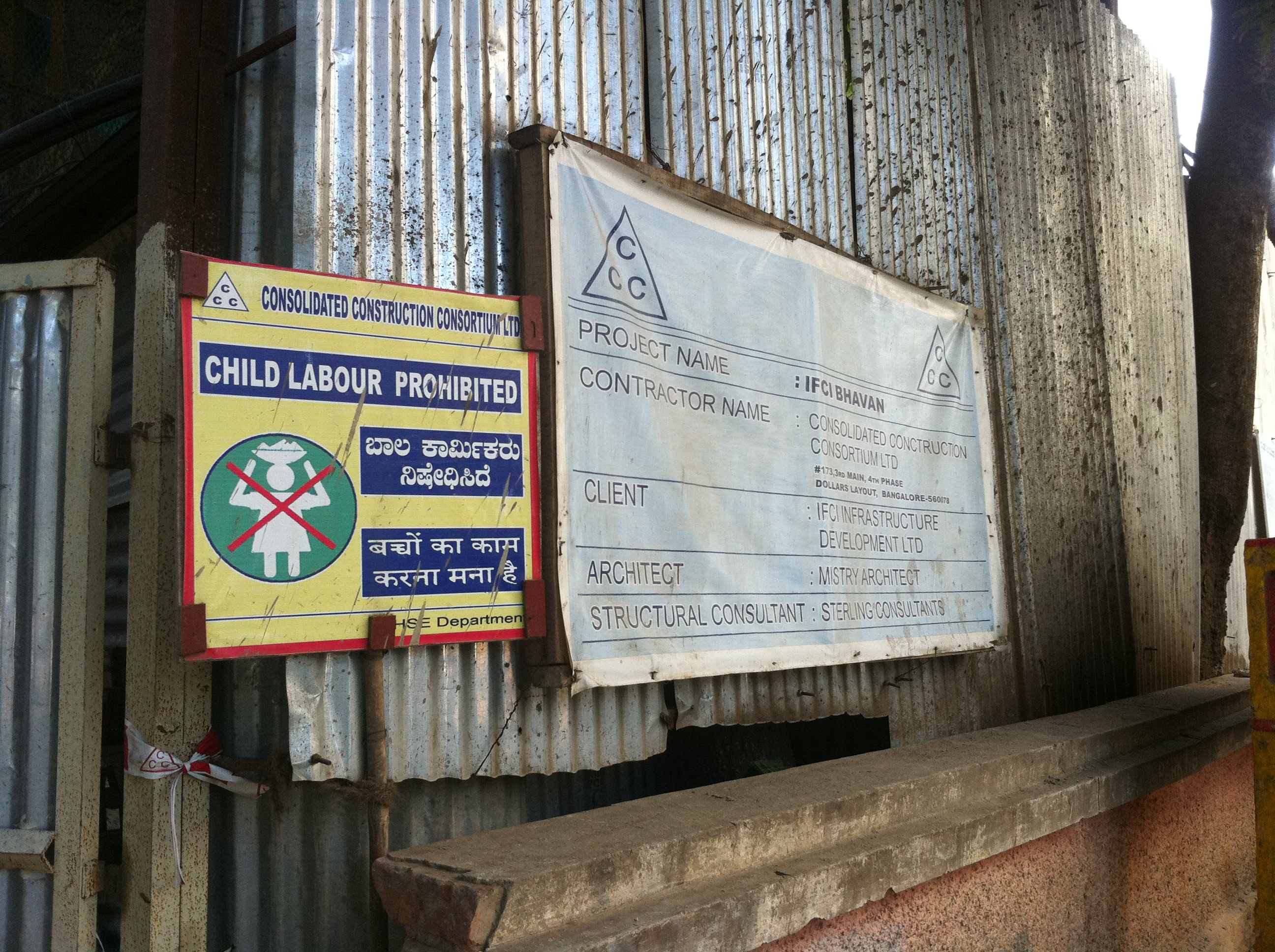
Labour law notices in India

The labour laws of India originated and express the socio-political views of leaders such as Nehru from pre-1947 independence movement struggle. These laws were expanded in part after debates in Constituent Assemblies and in part from international conventions and recommendations such as of International Labour Organization. The current mosaic of Indian laws on employment are thus a combination of India's history during its colonial heritage, India's experiments with socialism, important human rights and the conventions and standards that have emerged from the United Nations. The laws cover the right to work of one's choice, right against discrimination, prohibition of child labour, fair and humane conditions of work, social security, protection of wages, redress of grievances, right to organise and form trade unions, collective bargaining and participation in management.

India has numerous labour laws such as those prohibiting discrimination and Child labour, those that aim to guarantee fair and human conditions of work, those that provide social security, minimum wage, right to organise, form trade unions and enforce collective bargaining. India also has numerous rigid regulations such as maximum number of employees per company in certain sectors of economy, and limitations on employers on retrenchment and layoffs, requirement of paperwork, bureaucratic process and government approval for change in labour in companies even if these are because of economic conditions.

Indian labour laws are considered to be very highly regulated and rigid as compared to those of other countries in the world. The intensity of these laws have been criticised as the cause of low employment growth, large unorganised sectors, underground economy and low per capita income. These have led many to demand reforms for Labour market flexibility in India. India has over 50 major Acts and numerous laws that regulate employers in matters relating to industrial relations, employee unions as well as who, how and when enterprises can employ or terminate employment. Many of these laws survive from British colonial times, while some have been enacted after India's independence from Britain.

India is a federal form of government. Labour is a subject in the concurrent list of the Indian Constitution and therefore labour matters are in the jurisdiction of both central and state governments. Both central and state governments have enacted laws on labour relations and employment issues. Some of the major laws relevant to India are:

=== Workmen's Compensation Act of 1923 ===
The Workmen's Compensation Act compensates a workman for any injury suffered during the course of his employment or to his dependents in the case of his death. The Act provides for the rate at which compensation shall be paid to an employee. This is one of many social security laws in India.

=== Trade Unions Act of 1926 ===
This Act enacted the rules and protections granted to Trade Unions in India. This law was amended in 2001.

=== Payment of Wages Act of 1936 ===
The Payment of Wages Act regulates by when wages shall be distributed to employees by the employers. The law also provides the tax withholdings the employer must deduct and pay to the central or state government before distributing the wages.

=== Industrial Employment (Standing orders) Act of 1946 ===
This Act requires employers in industrial establishments to define and post the conditions of employment by issuing so-called standing orders. These standing orders must be approved by the government and duly certified. These orders aim to remove flexibility from the employer in terms of job, hours, timing, leave grant, productivity measures and other matters. The standing orders mandate that the employer classify its employees, state the shifts, payment of wages, rules for vacation, rules for sick leave, holidays, rules for termination amongst others.

=== Industrial Disputes Act of 1947 ===
The Industrial Disputes act 1947 regulates how employers may address industrial disputes such as lockouts, layoffs, retrenchment etc. It controls the lawful processes for reconciliation, adjudication of labour disputes.

The Act also regulates what rules and conditions employers must comply before the termination or layoff of a workman who has been in continuous service for more than one year with the employer. The employer is required to give notice of termination to the employee with a copy of the notice to appropriate government office seeking government's permission, explain valid reasons for termination, and wait for one month before the employment can be lawfully terminated. The employer may pay full compensation for one month in lieu of the notice. Furthermore, employer must pay an equivalent to 15 days average pay for each completed year of employees continuous service. Thus, an employee who has worked for four years in addition to various notices and due process, must be paid a minimum of the employee's wage equivalent to 60 days before retrenchment, if the government grants the employer a permission to lay off.

=== Minimum Wages Act of 1948 ===
The Minimum Wages Act prescribes minimum wages in all enterprises, and in some cases those working at home per the schedule of the Act. Central and State Governments can and do revise minimum wages at their discretion. The minimum wage is further classified by nature of work, location and numerous other factors at the discretion of the government. The minimum wage ranges between ₹ 143 to ₹ 1120 per day for work in the so-called central sphere. State governments have their own minimum wage schedules.

==== The Factories Act of 1948 ====
An Act to consolidate and amend the law regulating labour in factories.

=== Industries (Regulation and Development) Act of 1951 ===
This law declared numerous key manufacturing industries under its so-called First Schedule. It placed many industries under common central government regulations in addition to whatever laws state government enact. It also reserved over 600 products that can only be manufactured in small scale enterprises, thereby regulating who can enter in these businesses, and above all placing a limit on the number of employees per company for the listed products. The list included all key technology and industrial products in the early 1950s, including products ranging from certain iron and steel products, fuel derivatives, motors, certain machinery, machine tools, to ceramics and scientific equipment.

=== Employees Provident Fund and Miscellaneous Provisions Act of 1952 ===
This Act seeks to ensure the financial security of the employees in an establishment by providing for a system of compulsory savings. The Act provides for establishments of a contributory Provident Fund in which employees' contribution shall be at least equal to the contribution payable by the employer. Minimum contribution by the employees shall be 10-12% of the wages. This amount is payable to the employee after retirement and could also be withdrawn partly for certain specified purposes.

=== Maternity Benefit Act of 1961 ===
The Maternity Benefit Act regulates the employment of the women and maternity benefits mandated by law. Any woman employee who worked in any establishment for a period of at least 80 days during the 12 months immediately preceding the date of her expected delivery, is entitled to receive maternity benefits under the Act. The employer is required to pay maternity benefits, medical allowance, maternity leave and nursing breaks.

=== Payment of Bonus Act of 1965 ===
This Act, applies to an enterprise employing 20 or more persons. The Act requires employer to pay a bonus to persons on the basis of profits or on the basis of production or productivity. The Act was modified to require companies to pay a minimum bonus, even if the employer suffers losses during the accounting year. This minimum is currently 8.33 percent of the salary.

=== Payment of Gratuity Act of 1972 ===
This law applies to all establishments employing 10 or more workers. Gratuity is payable to the employee if he or she resigns or retires. The Indian government mandates that this payment be at the rate of 15 days salary of the employee for each completed year of service subject to a maximum of ₹ 10,00,000.

It is an act to provide for a scheme for the payment of gratuity to employees engaged in factories, mines, oilfields, ports, plantations, shops or other establishments and for matters connected therewith or incidental thereto.

== Economists' criticisms ==
Scholars suggest India's rigid labour laws and excessive regulations assumed to protect the labour are the cause of slow employment growth in high paying, organised sector. India's labour-related acts and regulations have led to labour-market rigidity. This encourages shadow economy for entrepreneurs, an economy that prefers to employ informal labour to avoid the complicated and opaque laws. In particular, Indian labour legislation such as the Industrial Disputes Act of 1947 added rigid labour laws and one sided trade union laws. Although the Act does not prohibit layoffs and retrenchments, it does require entrepreneurs and companies to get the permission from government officials to fire an employee for absenteeism, retrench employees for economic reasons, or to close an economically nonviable company. This bureaucratic process can stretch into years, and the government officials have consistently and almost always denied such permission. As a result, the scholars argue that India's inflexible labour laws have created a strong disincentive to formally register new companies and hire additional workers in existing organised sector companies. Unlike China, Indian businesses have avoided substituting India's abundant labour for export or domestic opportunities, or use labour instead of expensive equipment for quality control or other operations. These are reasons for India's weak employment growth.

More recently, a few scholars have completed a comparative study between states of India with different labour regulations. They compared states of India who have amended labour legislations to grant more flexibility to employers, to those states in India that have made their labour laws even more rigid and complicated to comply with. These studies find that states with flexible labour laws have grown significantly faster. Flexible labour states have been able to take advantage of the export opportunities, and the per capita household income has risen much faster in states with flexible labour laws. States with rigid labour laws have led local entrepreneurs to prefer casual workers or contract workers with finite employment time period; in essence, more rigid and inflexible labour law states see increased informal employment.

A 2007 article in The Economist finds India to have the most restrictive labour laws in any major economy of the world. India's private sector, including its organised manufacturing sector, employs about 10 million Indians. Manufacturing firms need to obtain government permission to lay off workers from factories, and this permission is usually denied if they have more than 100 staff. This partly explains why most Indian firms are small: 87 percent of employment in India's organised manufacturing sector is in firms with fewer than ten employees, compared with only 5 percent in China. Small Indian firms cannot reap economies of scale or exploit the latest technology, and so suffer from lower productivity than if they scaled up, employed more people and were much bigger companies. This cripples Indian firms ability to rapidly expand or adjust with changes in global economy, both during early opportunity phase and during economic change.

One exception is white collar jobs, where companies have stronger lobbies and employees are not unionised, so they have managed to operate freely with a much larger workforce and have been able to lay off a significant portion of their workforce without contravening labour laws. In almost all cases white collar employees are forced to resign under threat of negative recommendations and black-listing with industry associations.

Djankov and Ramalho have reviewed a number of labour studies on developing countries including India. They find, consistent with above criticisms, that countries with rigid employment laws have larger unorganised sectors and higher unemployment, especially among young workers. They also report the rigid, inflexible labour laws are strongly related to low per capita income.

== International comparison of Indian labour laws ==
The table below contrasts the labour laws of India to those of China and United States, as on 2011.

Relative regulations and rigidity in labor laws
Practice required by law	India	China	United States
Minimum wage (US$/month)	45 (INR 2500/month)	182.5	1242.6
Standard work day	9 hours	8 hours	8 hours
Minimum rest while at work	30 minutes per 5-hour	None	None
Maximum overtime limit	200 hours per year	432 hours per year	None
Premium pay for overtime	100%	50%	50%
Dismissal due to redundancy allowed?	Yes, if approved by government	Yes, without approval of government	Yes, without approval of government
Government approval required for 1 person dismissal	Yes	No	No
Government approval required for 9 person dismissal	Yes	No	No
Government approval for redundancy dismissal granted	Rarely	Not applicable	Not applicable
Dismissal priority rules regulated	Yes	Yes	No
Severance pay for redundancy dismissal of employee with 1-year tenure	2.1 week salary	4.3-week salary	None
Severance pay for redundancy dismissal of employee with 5-year tenure	10.7-week salary	21.7-week salary	None

== See also ==
- Labour law
- Industrial relations
- Indian labour law
- International labour law
- Occupational safety and health
- International Society for Labor Law and Social Security
- Criticism of capitalism
- Exploitation of labour
- Forced labour
- Work–life balance
