= Nursing Association of Nepal =

National governing body of nurses in Nepal

The Nursing Association of Nepal is the national governing body of nurses in Nepal. The central office is located in Kathmandu. It is a member of the International Council of Nurses.

The Nursing Association of Nepal coordinated patient care for 22,000 people after the April 2015 Nepal earthquake.

The Association won a Risk Award from the United Nations Office for Disaster Risk Reduction.

== See also ==
- List of nursing organizations
