= Canadian Indigenous Nurses Association =

Canadian non-profit organization

- Abbreviation: CINA
- Type: Scientific, education
- Legal status: active
- Purpose: professional nursing organization for Indigenous peoples in Canada.
- Headquarters: Ottawa, Ontario, Canada
- Region served: Canada
- Official language: English, French
- Affiliations: Canadian Nurses Association.
- Website: www.indigenousnurses.ca

The Canadian Indigenous Nurses Association (CINA) is a non-governmental, non-profit organization. It is an affiliate group of the Canadian Nurses Association. The CINA is the only professional nursing organization for Indigenous peoples in Canada and was formerly known as the Aboriginal Nurses Association of Canada. Ann Thomas Callahan, a Cree Canadian nurse, was involved in its creation, and the association presented her with a Lifetime Achievement Award in 2014.

== See also ==
- List of nursing organizations
