= Mary Agnes Snively =

Canadian nurse (1847–1933)

Mary Agnes Snivley
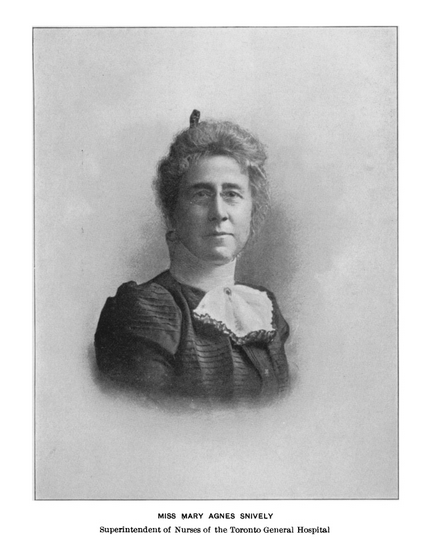
- Born: November 12, 1847; St. Catharines, Canada West
- Died: September 26, 1933 (aged 85)
- Occupation: Nurse

Mary Agnes Snively (12 November 1847 – 26 September 1933) was a Canadian nurse, later named as the first President of the Canadian Society of Superintendents of Training Schools for Nurses.

== Work ==
Mary Agnes Snively was born in St. Catharines, Canada West, to Martin Snively, born in Upper Canada, and Susan Copeland, born in Ireland. She was Lady Superintendent of Nurses at the Toronto General Hospital's School of Nursing from 1884 to 1910, where she established the first nursing student residence and a proper curriculum.

She co-founded the International Council of Nurses, and was its Honorary Treasurer from 1900 to 1904. She was also founder and president of the Canadian National Association of Trained Nurses from 1908 to 1912.

== Sources ==
- Ross-Kerr, J.C. & Wood, M.J. (2003) Canadian Nursing: Issues and Perspectives. Toronto, ON: Mosby.
