= Academy of Medical-Surgical Nurses =

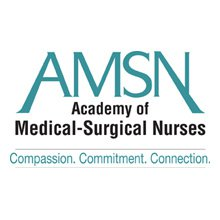
- Abbreviation: AMSN
- Formation: 1991
- Type: Professional organization
- Purpose: Nursing Association, Nursing Education, Professional Development
- Headquarters: Pitman, New Jersey, U.S.
- Website: www.amsn.org

The Academy of Medical-Surgical Nurses (AMSN) is a professional association for medical-surgical nurses in the United States. Its stated mission is "to promote excellence in medical-surgical nursing". AMSN was founded in 1991 and has chapters in all 50 states.
