= Democratic Nursing Organisation of South Africa =

Trade union in South Africa

DENOSA
- Democratic Nursing Organisation of South Africa
- Founded: 1996
- Headquarters: Pretoria, Gauteng
- Location: South Africa
- Members: 72,000
- Key people: Simon Hlungwani (president); Cassim Lekhoati (general secretary)
- Affiliations: COSATU, ICN (1997)
- Website: www.denosa.org.za

The Democratic Nursing Organisation of South Africa is a trade union in South Africa that describes itself as "a voluntary organisation for South African nurses and midwifery professionals".

It was established in its current form on 5 December 1996.

It is an affiliate of the Congress of South African Trade Unions and became a full member of the International Council of Nurses on 15 June 1997. The union suspended its participation in the leadership structures of the congress on 10 November 2014 as a result of the federations expulsion of the National Union of Metalworkers of South Africa on 7 November 2014.

At its 2010 congress, the organisation passed a resolution that the National Executive Committee should proceed with the merger with the South African Democratic Nurses' Union.

It has set up numerous projects with the aim of improving healthcare in South Africa. These mainly consist of workshops to educate nurses on HIV/AIDS and multi-drug-resistant tuberculosis
