= Nursing in South Africa =

Nurses in South Africa practise in a wide variety of specialties, with a wide variety of training and experience.

== Education ==
To take the exam to practice as an enrolled nurse, students must complete a two-year academic course that includes 2,000 hours of clinical practice.

Subjects studied in the first year include:

- Nursing history and ethics
- Basic nursing care
- Elementary nutrition
- First aid
- Elementary anatomy and physiology
- Introduction to comprehensive health care

The second year includes study of sciences fundamental to basic nursing and, depending on the area the nursing school is approved to teach, will include one of the following subjects:

- General nursing care
- Nursing care of the aged
- Nursing care of intellectually disabled persons
- Community nursing care
- Psychiatric nursing care

There are multiple nurse categories. Registered Nurses may study for a diploma or degree. Both function the same. Maroon epaulettes indicate a Registered Nurse with a general nursing diploma ( all Registered Nurses have general nursing) Then there is a variety of courses that can be completed and the color strips are added on the Maroon epaulettes

- Yellow is Community nursing
- Green is Midwifery
- Dark blue is psychiatric
- White is nursing education
- Silver is for nursing management

White epaulets indicate an enrolled nurse (staff nurse), who helps registered nurses with their duties and also helps the lower category of nurses when needed. In most hospitals, staff nurse give medications and help with doctors rounds. Staff nurses are also guided by their scope of practice and duties are under direct and indirect supervision of the Registered Nurse. If the staff nurse agrees to perform a duty s/he is accountable for her actions.

Enrolled Nursing assistants wear a blue button. They ensure all needs and comfort of the patients are met. They do everything within their scope of practice. Enrolled nurses may not penetrate the skin or body a patient without direct supervision of a registered nurse.

== Legal regulation ==
The South African Nursing Council (SANC) was initially established by the Nursing Act, No. 45 of 1944, and currently by the Nursing Act, No. 50 of 1978 as amended. SANC inspects and approves nursing schools and education programs; examines, registers, and enrolls nurses, midwives, and nursing auxiliaries; licenses nursing agencies; and monitors nursing employers. Nurses and nurse auxiliaries are required to wear "distinguishing devices" consisting of pins and colored epaulettes to identify them as licensed professionals.
