= Nursing Students Without Borders =

- Founded: 1999
- Type: Health care

Nursing Students Without Borders (NSWB) is an international, not-for-profit health care-related non-governmental organization created and led by nursing students in conjunction with relevant fields of science and humanitarian aid which focuses on improving living conditions where poverty exists both internationally and in the United States. Founded at the University of Virginia in 1999, NSWB created a constitution that provides a self replicating method of leadership that has been adopted by many universities across the nation including Virginia Commonwealth University, James Madison University, Purdue University, University of Massachusetts Lowell, Oregon Health & Science University.Hartwick College (Oneonta, NY), Ohio State, Seattle Central Community College, Messiah College, and MCPHS University.Duke University School of Nursing. The newest chapter of National Nursing Students Without Borders was founded in 2023 at Milwaukee Area Technical College.

Since 1999 the different chapters of NSWB have traveled to El Salvador, Belize, Ghana, Haiti, Jamaica, Russia, Ecuador, Guatemala and in the impoverished areas surrounding the chapters. In order to remain free to promote health in politically tense zones around the world, NSWB remains independent of any political or governmental affiliation. All funds are donated to the non-profit body and no party within the group is paid to provide services.

== History ==
Nursing Students Without Borders was founded in the summer of 1999 by third-year University of Virginia (UVA) nursing school students Matthew Walden, Esther Miller, Ann Maushammer, Bridget Kuczkowski, Teri Woodard, Rosalind DeLisser, and Bob Watkins and two Charlottesville community members, Thomas "Roddy" Hughes, JD and Nathan S. Ivey, PhD .

== Activities ==
The multidisciplinary health care team provides a key set of health maintenance support to chosen communities locally and internationally. This includes assessing public health emergencies, endemic diseases and individual patients' needs, developing plans of care, and providing continued care over a set period of time. The types of care that are provided include whole body hygiene education, performing wound care, monitoring community diseases such as diabetes, hypertension, sexually transmitted diseases, malaria, malnutrition, blood-borne disease, influenza as well as family planning, maternal-child care, assessing fetal heart tones and gestational age.

The founding chapter of Nursing Students Without Borders has undertaken a larger initiative to provide support for the construction of a Red Cross medical clinic in San Sebastián, San Vicente, El Salvador. The UVA chapter also has the most extensive outreach program of all the NSWB chapters. Beginning in 2000 the El Salvador Initiative has traveled to San Sebastián 11 times; also beginning in 2000 the Migrant Health Initiative began provided local assistance to migrant camps in the Charlottesville, Virginia area; between 2001 and 2002 the Russia Initiative completed two trips to Kysmolovsky, Russia; and in 2004 the South Africa Initiative worked with local clinics, provided health education on various topics and delivered needed supplies in The South Africa Initiative to a community in Thohoyandou, Limpopo Province.

== See also ==
- Médecins Sans Frontières (Doctors Without Borders)
