= Society of Gynecologic Nurse Oncologists =

The Society of Gynecologic Nurse Oncologists (SGNO) is an international organization made up of nurses and other health professionals in the field of gynecologic oncology and women's health care.

== Mission ==
The society is dedicated to the advancement of patient care, education, and research in gynecologic oncology and women's health care.

== History ==
In 1980, a group of ten U.S. and Canadian nurses met in Scottsdale, Arizona, with a goal to form a gynecologic oncology nurses society. These ten nurses became the founding council of the SGNO:

- Cynthia Beebe
- Terry Chamorro
- Lynda Ronan-Conan
- Mary Lou Cullen
- Terre Currie
- Diana Hoff
- Judith Hubbard
- Sharon Kelly
- Paula Major
- Helen Peterson

=== Presidents ===
- 1984-1988 Lynda Ronan-Cowen
- 1988-1992 Judy Dean-Hubbard
- 1992-1994 Beth Colvin-Huff
- 1994-1996 Lois Almadrones
- 1996-1998 Lois Winkleman
- 1998-2000 Sheryl Redlin-Frazier
- 2000-2002 Suzy Lockwood
- 2002-2004 Alice Spinelli
- 2004-2006 Susan Temple
- 2006-2008 Susan McIntyre
- 2008-2010 Susan Coples
- 2010-2012 Lynn Cloutier
- 2012-2014 Vicky Willis

== Annual symposium ==
In July 1983, the first SGNO educational conference was held in Denver, Colorado. Seventy-five nurses from the United States and Canada attended the conference. Since then, the Society has hosted an annual educational symposium that concentrates on the care of women with gynecologic cancers and overall women’s health.

== SGNO publications ==
- Contemporary Issues in Women's Cancers - reference book
- Women and Cancer - textbook
- The Journal of Gynecologic Oncology Nursing - the Society's official peer-reviewed journal that is indexed in the Cumulative Index to Nursing and Allied Health Literature.
