= Nurse Practitioner Associates for Continuing Education =

Non-profit organization

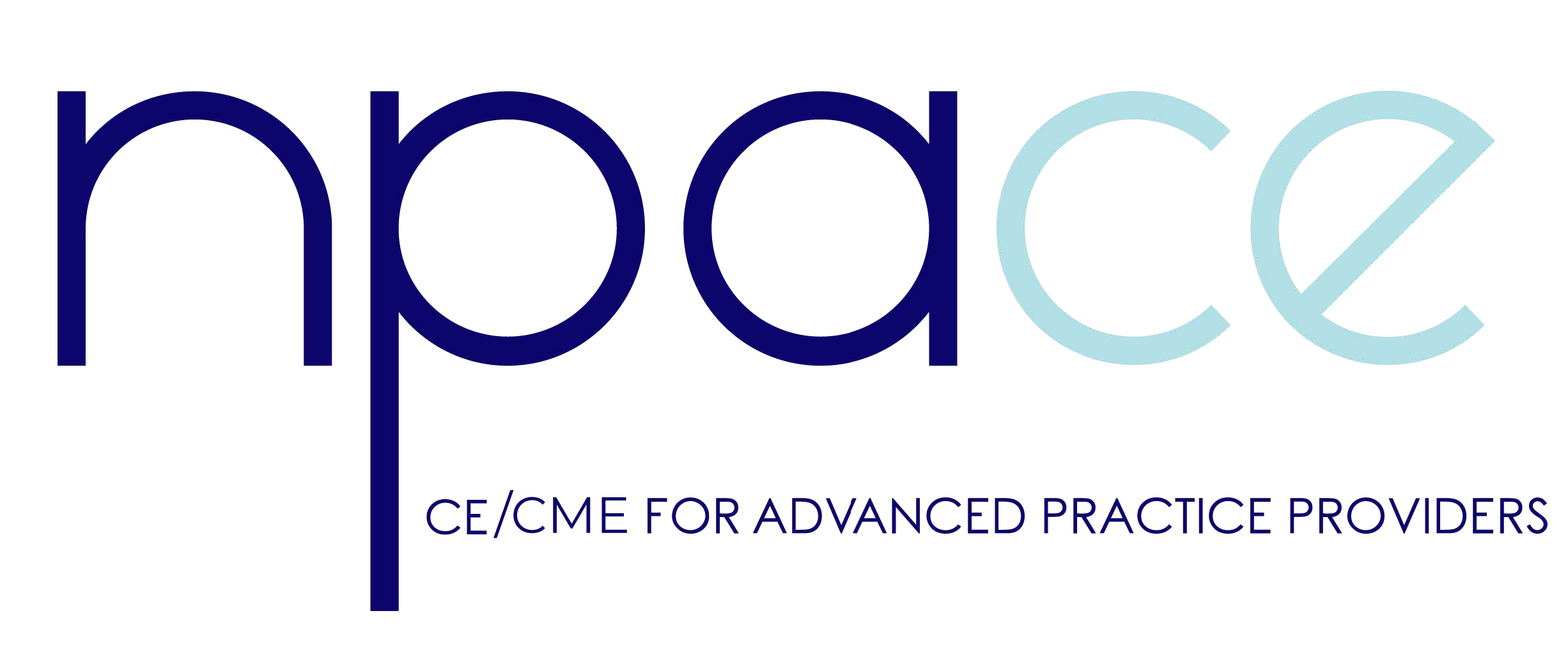
NPACE: CE/CME For Advanced Practice Providers

Nurse Practitioner Associates for Continuing Education (NPACE) is a national nonprofit organization that provides continuing education for nurse practitioners (NPs), physician assistants (PAs), and other advanced practice providers (APPs). NPACE is accredited to offer a range of continuing education (CE) and continuing medical education (CME) opportunities in live, virtual, and on-demand formats.

== History ==
NPACE was established in 1980 by a small group of New England Nurse Practitioners. At the time, there was a lack of conferences that addressed the specific educational requirements of Nurse Practitioners (NP). Up to this point, nurse practitioners attended educational conferences designed for physicians. Noticing this void, the NPACE founders’ vision was to develop continuing education programs “For Nurse Practitioners, by Nurse Practitioners.” It was the first formal organization to focus on the continuing education needs of nurse practitioners.

In its early years, NPACE held conferences in the Greater Boston area and expanded over time to national scale. In 1992, it organized its first major national conference with attendance from across the United States. Through the subsequent decades, NPACE added specialty and advanced practice topics — such as women's health, pharmacology, and geriatrics — and broadened its offerings to include multi-format educational programs.

Over more than 40 years, NPACE evolved from a regional NP education network into a national provider of professional development, serving thousands of clinicians across multiple specialties and practice environments.

== Accreditation ==
NPACE is accredited as a provider of Nursing Continuing Professional Development (NCPD) by the American Nurses Credentialing Center’s (ANCC) Commission on Accreditation. Continuing education credits issued by NPACE are accepted for nurse practitioner licensure and certification renewal, including by the American Academy of Nurse Practitioners Certification Program (AANPCP).

NPACE is also accredited to provide Continuing Medical Education (CME) for physician assistants through the American Academy of Physician Associates (AAPA).

Through these accreditations, NPACE offers CE and CME activities that support ongoing clinical competence, professional development, and regulatory compliance for advanced practice providers.

== Educational Offerings ==
NPACE offers a variety of educational programs designed to support clinical practice, professional development, and regulatory requirements for advanced practice providers:

- Live Conferences: In-person multi-day educational conferences hosted at locations across the United States. These conferences feature clinical lectures, interactive sessions, and specialty-focused content across primary care, pharmacology, women's health, mental health, geriatrics, pediatrics, and other practice areas.
- Virtual Conferences: Live-streamed educational events that allow remote participation, often with extended access to recorded sessions following the event.
- On-Demand Education: Self-paced online courses and bundled learning activities available through the NPACE Learning Center. Topics span clinical care, professional practice, and specialty education, allowing learners to complete coursework according to individual schedules.

Educational activities may offer CE, CME, or both, depending on participant credentials and course designation. Completion requirements and access periods vary by activity.

== External Sponsors and Educational Partnerships ==
NPACE collaborates with external educational partners, professional organizations, and sponsors to expand access to continuing education for advanced practice providers. These collaborations may include sponsored educational activities, free or reduced-cost learning opportunities, and jointly developed content aligned with NPACE's educational standards and accreditation requirements. Sponsor opportunities can be found on the NPACE site.
