= United Nurses Association =

Insian professional organization

- Abbreviation: UNA
- Formation: 16/11/2011
- Headquarters: Thrissur, India
- Region served: Worldwide
- Members: For Registered Nurses
- President: M. Jasminsha
- Affiliations: UNSA, UNFA, UHSA
- Website: www.unaworld.org

United Nurses Association (UNA) is a professional association of registered nurses in India. It was started in Kerala. The organisation discusses problems faced by nurses in their working environment.

== History ==
Kerala nurses first joined at Thrissur district. The first meeting was about the increased threat of seizing the assets of nursing students who had taken educational loans. Then, Beena Baby, a Malayalee nurse, committed suicide while working at a hospital in Mumbai due to staff bullying, illegal management practices and bond issues. The so-called "bond system" executed by the Mumbai based hospital was an indirect violation of the Bonded Labor System (Abolition) Act, 1976. Ms Baby's death triggered a public outcry, leading to the formation of "UNA", along with many other nurse associations.

United Nurses Association was created by Jasminsha and six other working nurses of Thrissur on 16 November 2011. UNA gained awareness among nurses and society through social media.

== Chartered flights ==
During the COVID-19 pandemic, United Nurses Association arranged chartered flights for stranded nurses in Saudi Arabia in association with Avas charitable trust. The chartered flights were coordinated by Mr. Jithin Lohi international coordinator, Mr. Jasminsha President and the leaders of UNA. The coordinations successfully handled only with the help of WhatsApp groups. The first chartered flight from Saudi was on 7 June 2020, from Riyadh to Kochi. Since then UNA had successfully scheduled and executed seven chartered flights from Riyad, Dammam and Jeddah.

== See also ==
- Nursing in India
- Healthcare in India
