= South African Democratic Nurses' Union =

SADNU
- South African Democratic Nurses' Union
- Founded: 1995
- Headquarters: (Johannesburg) South Africa
- Location: South Africa
- Members: 9200
- Key people: [S Kene], president [V Moukangwe], general secretary
- Affiliations: COSATU
- Website: www.cosatu.org.za/affiliates

The South African Democratic Nurses' Union is a trade union in South Africa. It is an affiliate of the Congress of South African Trade Unions (COSATU).

SANDU held 10th anniversary in 2004 (therefore its origin is in 1994). The anniversary was held in Limpopo province, Polokwane at the then Oasis Lodge. Among delegates was Gwede Mantashe now minister of Energy in South African cabinet.

It was at this congress anniversary that SACP and COSATU endorsed Mr JZ Zuma as a potential suite for ANC presidential candidate in 2007.
