= Bonded Labour System (Abolition) Act, 1976 =

Indian Act to abolish bonded slavery

Parliament of India
- Long title: An Act to provide for the abolition of bonded labour system with a view to preventing the economic and physical exploitation of the weaker sections of the people and for matters connected therewith or incidental thereto.
- Citation: Act 19 of 1976
- Territorial extent: Whole of India
- Enacted by: Parliament of India
- Enacted: 9 February 1976
- Assented to: 9 February 1976
- Effective: 25 October 1975
- Status: In force

The Bonded Labour System (Abolition) Act, 1976 is an Act of the Parliament of India aimed at abolishing the bonded labour system. The Act was enacted on 9 February 1976 but was deemed to have come into force on 25 October 1975, the date on which the Bonded Labour System (Abolition) Ordinance, 1975 was promulgated. The Act freed unilaterally all the bonded labourers from bondage and erased their debts. Further, the practice of bondage was made a cognizable offence punishable by law. The Act is a landmark piece of legislation in India's efforts to combat forced labour, which is prohibited under Article 23 of the Constitution of India.

== Background ==
The practice of bonded labour, a system where a debtor enters into an agreement with a creditor to render services (either by themselves or through family members) for a specified or unspecified period for nominal or no wages as repayment of a debt, has deep historical roots in India, often linked to social structures like the caste system and rural indebtedness. Interest structures were typically usurious and interest often exceeded effective wages earned. Further, because of illiteracy and social backwardness of debtors, the debt may pass to future generations contributing to extreme poverty under this system.

== Key objective ==
The primary objective of the Act is:

to provide for the abolition of bonded labour system with a view to preventing the economic and physical exploitation of the weaker sections of the people and for matters connected therewith or incidental thereto.

The Act was preceded by the Bonded Labour System (Abolition) Ordinance, 1975, promulgated by the President of India on 24 October 1975, which came into force on 25 October 1975. The Act replaced this ordinance with permanent legislation.

== Provisions ==
The Act emphasizes the economic and social rehabilitation of freed bonded labourers. To facilitate this, Central Government launched a rehabilitation scheme in May 1978, which was subsequently updated in 2016 and 2021. The schemes provide financial assistance as well as provisions for surveys, evaluatory studies, and awareness generation activities.

The primary responsibility for implementing the Act lies with the State Governments.

== Aftermath ==
While the act legally abolished the system and freed individuals from bondage debts, the practice of bonded labour continues to persist in various forms across different sectors, including agriculture, brick kilns, stone quarries, mining, and domestic work. Difficulties in accurately identifying bonded labourers, weak enforcement and inadequate legal oversight, ineffective rehabilitation, and emergence of new and disguised forms of bonded labour, particularly involving migrant workers and informal sectors have contributed to the persistence of the practice. Socio-economic factors like poverty, landlessness, caste discrimination, and lack of access to formal credit continue to drive people into bondage. The National Human Rights Commission of India (NHRC) has been actively involved in monitoring the implementation of the Act since 1997.
