= Canadian Nurses Association =

Canadian professional association

- Abbreviation: CNA or AIIC
- Formation: 1908
- Type: Professional association
- Headquarters: Ottawa, Canada
- Region served: Canada
- Official language: English and French
- President: Tracie Risling
- President-elect: Pritma Dhillon-Chattha
- Website: www.cna-aiic.ca

The Canadian Nurses Association (CNA), known in French as the Association des infirmières et infirmiers du Canada (AIIC), is the national professional association representing registered nurses, nurse practitioners, licensed and registered practical nurses, registered psychiatric nurses and retired nurses across all 13 provinces and territories in Canada. CNA advances the practice and profession of nursing to improve health outcomes and strengthen Canada's publicly funded, not-for-profit health system. CNA represents Canadian nursing to other organizations and to governments nationally and internationally. It gives nurses a strong national association through which they can support each other and speak with a powerful, unified voice. It provides nurses with a core staff of nursing and health policy consultants and experts in other areas such as communications and specialty certification. CNA's active role in legislative policy influences the health care decisions that affect nursing professionals every day. It has published a large number of documents, including the Code of Ethics for Registered Nurses.

== History ==
In 1907, representatives of 16 organized nursing bodies met in Ottawa to form the Canadian National Association of Trained Nurses (CNATN). By 1911, CNATN comprised 28 affiliated member societies, including alumni associations of hospital schools of nursing as well as local and regional groups of nurses. By 1924, each of the nine provinces had a provincial nurses' organization with membership in CNATN, and in that year, the national group changed its name to the Canadian Nurses Association (CNA).

The CNA Dutch tulip Celebration Garden and plaque memorial, which were unveiled at the CNA building after 2002, is dedicated to the Canadian Nursing Sisters of World War II and Sharon Nield (Director nursing Policy 1943–2002).

== National Expert Commission ==
CNA created a National Expert Commission (NEC) in the spring of 2011 so it could draw on both external and internal expertise, gather evidence and participate effectively in the dialogue associated with the anticipated renewal of a national Health Accord for Canada in 2014. With the presentation of a final report in June 2012, the NEC has provided CNA with a blueprint, solidly based in evidence and best practices, to help nurses target what health outcomes they should work toward and lead a shift to a new and improved health system that will meet the growing and changing health needs of Canadians.

The NEC was co-chaired by Marlene Smadu and Maureen McTeer.

- Final Report: A Nursing Call to Action: The health of our nation, the future of our health system

== CNA Certification ==
CNA certification is a nationally recognized nursing specialty credential. It is a voluntary credential for nurses who meet specific nursing practice, continuous learning and testing requirements. As of 2019, CNA certification is available to registered nurses, nurse practitioners and licensed/registered practical nurses. The first certification exam, offered in 1991, was in neuroscience nursing. Today, more than 16,000 nurses are CNA certified in one of 22 specialties.

== Nurses' defamation lawsuit ==
In January 2022, three Ontario nurses who had previously been investigated and disciplined for their social media posts about the COVID-19 pandemic filed a lawsuit against the CNA and British Columbia-based Together News alleging defamation and seeking $1 million in damages. The lawsuit stemmed from an article published September 9, 2021 on CNA's website which "the reckless views of a handful of discredited people who identify as nurses." Two days later, Together News followed with a story about the nurses entitled "Quack! Quack! These pro-virus nurses have dangerous ideas." They were represented in their filing by Alexander Boissonneau-Lehner of Johnstone & Cowling.

== Leadership ==
=== President ===
- 1908–1912 – Mary Agnes Snively
- 1912–1914 – Mary Ardcronie MacKenzie
- 1914–1917 – Charlotte Phoebe (Wright) Bryce-Brown
- 1917–1920 – Jean Isabel Gunn
- 1920–1922 – Edith Macpherson Dickson
- 1922–1926 – Jean E. Browne (Thomson)
- 1926–1927 – Flora Madeline Shaw
- 1927–1928 – Mabel F. Gray (interim)
- 1928–1930 – Mabel F. Hersey
- 1930–1934 – Florence H. M. Emory
- 1934–1938 – Ruby M. Simpson
- 1938–1942 – Grace Mitchell Fairley
- 1942–1944 – Marion Lindeburgh
- 1944–1946 – Fanny C. Munroe
- 1946–1948 – Rae Chittick
- 1948–1950 – Ethel Mildred Cryderman
- 1950–1954 – Helen Griffith Wylie McArthur (Watson)
- 1954–1956 – Gladys J. Sharpe
- 1956–1958 – Trenna G. Hunter
- 1958–1960 – Alice M. Girard
- 1960–1962 – Helen Maude Carpenter
- 1962–1964 – E. A. Electa MacLennan
- 1964–1966 – A. Isobel Black-MacLeod
- 1966–1967 – Katherine Eva MacLaggan
- 1967–1970 – Sister Mary Felicitas (Wekel)
- 1970–1972 – E. Louise Miner
- 1972–1974 – Marguerite Schumacher
- 1974–1976 – Huguette Labelle
- 1976–1978 – Joan Gilchrist
- 1978–1980 – Helen Doris Taylor
- 1980–1982 – Shirley Marie Stinson
- 1982–1984 – Helen Preston Glass
- 1984–1986 – Lorine Besel
- 1986–1988 – Helen Hill Evans
- 1988–1990 – Judith Anne Ritchie
- 1990–1992 – Alice Baumgart
- 1992–1994 – Fernande P. (St. Onge) Harrison
- 1994–1996 – Eleanor Ross
- 1996–1998 – Rachel Bard
- 1998–2000 – Lynda Kushnir Pekrul
- 2000–2002 – Ginette Lemire Rodger
- 2002–2004 – Robert Calnan
- 2004–2006 – Deborah Tamlyn
- 2006–2008 – Marlene Smadu
- 2008–2010 – Kaaren Neufeld
- 2010–2012 – Judith Shamian
- 2012–2014 – Barb Mildon
- 2014–2016 – Karima Velji
- 2016–2018 – Barb Shellian
- 2018–2020 – Claire Betker
- 2020–2022 – Tim Guest
- 2022–2024 – Sylvain Brousseau
- 2024–2026 – Kimberly LeBlanc
- 2026–2028 – Tracie Risling

=== Chief Executive Officer ===
From 1923, the de facto chief executive of the CNA was the Executive Secretary. In 1944 the title changed to General Secretary, and in 1963 to Executive Director. In 2006, the title of the Executive Director was changed to CEO.

1. Jean Scantlion Wilson, 1923–1943
2. Kathleen Wilhelmina Ellis, 1943–1944
3. Gertrude M. Hall, 1944–1952
4. Myrtle Pearl Stiver, 1952–1963
5. Helen Kathleen Mussallem, 1963–1981
6. Ginette Lemire Rodger, 1981–1989
7. Judith A. Oulton, 1989–1995
8. Mary Ellen Jeans, 1995–2001
9. Lucille M. Auffrey, 2001–2009
10. Rachel Bard, 2009–2013
11. Anne Sutherland Boal, 2013–2017
12. Michael Villeneuve, 2017–2022
13. Tim Guest, 2022–2024
14. Valerie Grdisa, 2024–present

== Arms ==
Coat of arms of Canadian Nurses Association
Crest A demi-lion Or grasping a scroll Argent; Escutcheon Gules three piles meeting in nombril point, in base a lamp enflamed Or; Supporters Two harts Argent attired and unguled Sable each gorged with a collar wavy Azure charged with lozenges Argent pendent therefrom a torteau bordered ermine and charged with an ancient crown Or, both standing on a mount of maple leaves Or; Motto SCIENTIA • SAPIENTIA • HUMANITAS

== Publications and Reports ==
Publications

- Framework for the Practice of Registered Nurses in Canada
- Principles to Guide Health Care Transformation in Canada (joint publication between CNA and the Canadian Medical Association)
- Harm Reduction and Currently Illegal Drugs: Implications for Nursing Policy, Practice, Education and Research
- Social Justice: A Means to an End, an End in Itself, 2nd Edition
- Recommendations of the Canadian Nurse Practitioner Initiative, 2009
- Nurses at the Forefront of HIV/AIDS

== See also ==
- CNA's Canadian Network of Nursing Specialties
- Canadian Indigenous Nurses Association
- List of nursing organizations
- Canadian Nurses Association website
- Canadian Nurses Association: One Hundred Years of Service

=== Archives ===
There is a Canadian Nurses Association fonds at Library and Archives Canada. The archival reference number is R4440, former archival reference number MG28-I248. The fonds covers the date range 1858 to 1998. It consists of 32.2 meters of textual records, approximately 10,000 photographs, and a number of other media records.
