= Medical-surgical nursing =

Nursing specialty

Medical-surgical nursing is a nursing specialty area concerned with the care of adult patients in a broad range of settings. Traditionally, medical-surgical nursing was an entry-level position that most nurses viewed as a stepping stone to specialty areas. Medical-surgical nursing is the largest group of professionals in the field of nursing. Advances in medicine and nursing have resulted in medical-surgical nursing evolving into its own specialty.

Many years ago a majority of hospital nurses worked on wards, and everyone was a medical-surgical nurse. Today licensed medical-surgical nurses work in a variety of positions, inpatient clinics, emergency departments, HMO's, administration, out patient surgical centers, home health care, humanitarian relief work, ambulatory surgical care, and skilled nursing homes. Some military medical-surgical nurses serve on battlefields.

Registered nurses can become certified medical-surgical nurses through the American Nurses Credentialing Center. and also through the Medical-Surgical Nursing Certification Board's (MSNCB) (msncb.org) Certified Medical-Surgical Registered Nurse (CMSRN) credential.

== See also ==
- Medical surgical nursing certification
