= Child labour in India =

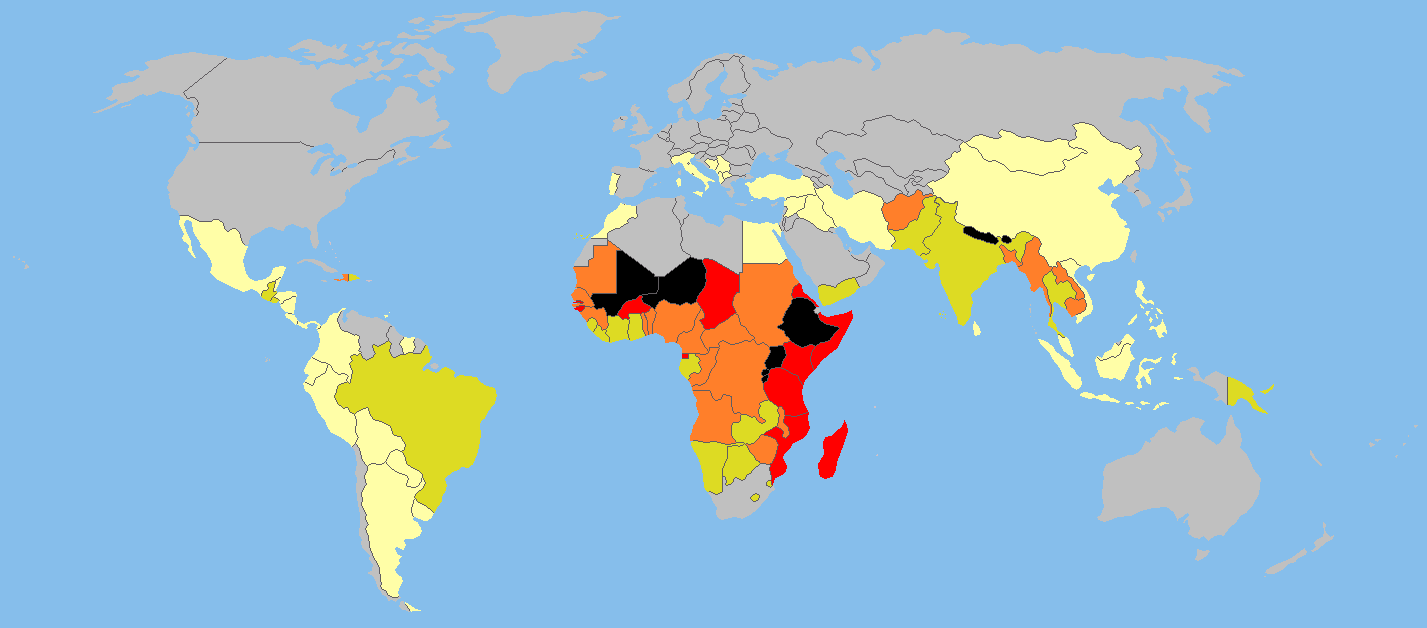
Child labour in India and rest of the world, during 2003 in 10–18 age group, with an estimated 11%, is in green with 10–20% incidence levels, along with countries in red (30%–40%) and brown and black (40%–100%), World Bank World Development Indicators 2005.

A proportion of children in India are engaged in child labour. In 2011, the national census of India found the total number of child labourers (age 5–14) to be 10.12 million, out of the total of 259.64 million children in that age group. The child labour problem is not unique to India; worldwide, about 217 million children work, many full-time.

As per the Child and Adolescent Labour (Prohibition and Regulation) Act, 1986, amended in 2016 ("CLPR Act"), a "Child" is defined as any person below the age of 14, and the CLPR Act prohibits employment of a Child in any employment, including as a domestic help; to do otherwise is a criminal offence. Conversely, children between the ages of 14 and 18 are defined as "Adolescent" and are allowed to be employed except in mining, flammable substance- and explosives-related work, and other hazardous processes, per the Factories Act of 1948. In 2001, an estimated 1% of all child workers, or about 120,000 children in India were in a hazardous job. Notably, the Constitution of India prohibits child labour in hazardous industries (but not in non-hazardous industries) as a Fundamental Right under Article 24. UNICEF estimates that India with its larger population, has the highest number of labourers in the world under 14 years of age, while sub-Saharan African countries have the highest percentage of children who are deployed as child labourers. The International Labour Organization estimates that agriculture, at 60 percent, is the largest employer of child labour in the world, while the United Nations Food and Agriculture Organization estimates 70% of child labour is deployed in agriculture and related activities. Outside of agriculture, child labour is observed in almost all informal sectors of the Indian economy.

Companies including Gap, Primark, and Monsanto have been criticised for child labour in their products. The companies claim they have strict policies against selling products made by underage children for their own profit, but there are many links in a supply chain making it difficult to oversee them all. In 2011, after three years of Primark's effort, the BBC acknowledged that its award-winning investigative journalism report of Indian child labour use by Primark was a fake. The BBC apologised to Primark, to Indian suppliers and all its viewers. Another company that has come under much scrutiny was Nike. Nike was under pressure to speak up about alleged sweatshops that harbored children that the company was exploiting to make their sneakers. Since then Nike has come out with a separate web page that specifically points out where they get their products from and where their products are manufactured.

In December 2014, the U.S. Department of Labor issued a List of Goods Produced by Child Labor or Forced Labor and India figured among 74 countries where a significant incidence of critical working conditions has been observed. Unlike any other country, 23 goods were attributed to India, the majority of which are produced by child labour in the manufacturing sector.

In addition to the constitutional prohibition of hazardous child labour, various laws in India, such as the Juvenile Justice (care and protection) of Children Act-2000 and the Child Labour (Prohibition and Abolition) Act 1986, provide a basis in law to identify, prosecute and stop child labour in India.

== Definition of child labour ==
The term 'child labour', suggests ILO, is best defined as work that deprives children of their childhood, their potential and their dignity, and that is harmful to physical and mental development. Interferes with their schooling by depriving them of the opportunity to attend school; obliging them to leave school prematurely; or requiring them to attempt to combine school attendance with excessively long and heavy work.

UNICEF defines child labour differently. A child, suggests UNICEF, is involved in child labour activities if between 5 and 11 years of age, he or she did at least one hour of economic activity or at least 28 hours of domestic work in a week, and in case of children between 12 and 14 years of age, he or she did at least 14 hours of economic activity or at least 42 hours of economic activity and domestic work per week. UNICEF, in another report, suggests that "Children's work needs to be seen as happening along a continuum, with destructive or exploitative work at one end and beneficial work – promoting or enhancing children's development without interfering with their schooling, recreation and rest – at the other. And between these two poles are vast areas of work that need not negatively affect a child's development."

India's Census 2001 office defines child labour as participation of a child less than 17 years of age in any economically productive activity with or without compensation, wages or profit. Such participation could be physical or mental or both. This work includes part-time help or unpaid work on the farm, family enterprise or in any other economic activity such as cultivation and milk production for sale or domestic consumption. Indian government classifies child labourers into two groups: main workers are those who work 6 months or more per year, and marginal child workers are those who work at any time during the year but less than 6 months in a year.

Some child rights activists argue that child labour must include every child who is not in school because he or she is a hidden child worker. UNICEF, however, points out that India faces major shortages of schools, classrooms and teachers particularly in rural areas where 90 percent of child labour problem is observed. About 1 in 5 primary schools have just one teacher to teach students across all grades.

After its independence from colonial rule, India has passed a number of constitutional protections and laws on child labour. The Constitution of India in the Fundamental Rights and the Directive Principles of State Policy prohibits child labour below the age of 14 years in any factory or mine or castle or engaged in any other hazardous employment (Article 24). The constitution also envisioned that India shall, by 1960, provide infrastructure and resources for free and compulsory education to all children of the age six to 14 years. (Article 21-A and Article 45).

India has a federal form of government, and labour being a subject in the Concurrent List, both the central and state governments can and have legislated on child labour.

=== Factories Act, 1948 ===
The Act prohibits the employment of children below the age of 14 years in any factory. The law also placed rules on who, when and how long can pre-adults aged 15–18 years be employed in any factory

=== Mines Act, 1952 ===
The Act prohibits the employment of children below 18 years of age in a mine.

=== The Child Labour (Prohibition and Regulation) Act, 1986- ( CLPR Act ) ===
The CLPR Act prohibits employment of any person below the age of 14 (deemed a "Child") in any employment, including as a domestic help, except in helping their own family in non-hazardous occupations. Children between age of 14 and 18 are instead defined as "Adolescent", and the law allows them to be employed except in mining, flammable substance- and explosives-related work, and other hazardous processes.

=== Right of Children to Free and Compulsory Education Act, 2009 ===
The law mandates free and compulsory education to all children aged 6 to 16 years. This legislation also mandated that 25 percent of seats in every private school must be allocated for children from economically disadvantaged groups (though implementation gaps remained).

India formulated a National Policy on Child Labour in 1987. This Policy seeks to adopt a gradual & sequential approach with a focus on rehabilitation of children working in hazardous occupations. It envisioned strict enforcement of Indian laws on child labour combined with development programs to address the root causes of child labour such as poverty. In 1988, this led to the National Child Labour Project (NCLP) initiative. This legal and development initiative continues, with a current central government funding of Rs. 6 billion, targeted solely to eliminate child labour in India. Despite these efforts, child labour remains a major challenge for India.

== Causes ==
For much of human history and across different cultures, children less than 18 years old have contributed to family welfare in a variety of ways. UNICEF suggests that poverty is the biggest cause of child labour. The report also notes that in rural and impoverished parts of developing and undeveloped parts of the world, children have no real and meaningful alternative. Schools and also teachers are unavailable. Child labour is the unnatural result. A BBC report, similarly, concludes poverty and inadequate public education infrastructure are some of the causes of child labour in India.

Between boys and girls, UNICEF finds girls are two times more likely to be out of school and working in a domestic role. Parents with limited resources, claims UNICEF, have to choose whose school costs and fees they can afford when a school is available. Educating girls tends to be a lower priority across the world, including India. Girls are also harassed or bullied at schools, sidelined by prejudice or poor curricula, according to UNICEF. Solely by virtue of their gender, therefore, many girls are kept from school or drop out, then provide child labour.

The international labour organisation (ILO) and Spreading Smiles Through Education Organisation (OSSE) suggests poverty is the greatest single force driving children into the workplace. Income from a child's work is felt to be crucial for his/her own survival or for that of the household. For some families, income from their children's labour is between 25 and 40% of the household income.

According to a 2008 study by ILO, among the most important factors driving children to harmful labour is the lack of availability and quality of schooling. Many communities, particularly rural areas do not possess adequate school facilities. Even when schools are sometimes available, they are too far away, difficult to reach, unaffordable or the quality of education is so poor that parents wonder if going to school is really worthwhile. In government-run primary schools, even when children show up, government-paid teachers do not show up 25% of the time. The 2008 ILO study suggests that illiteracy resulting from a child going to work, rather than a quality primary and secondary school, limits the child's ability to get a basic educational grounding which would in normal situations enable them to acquire skills and to improve their prospects for a decent adult working life.

An older report published by UNICEF outlines the issues summarized by the ILO report. The UNICEF report claimed that while 90% of child labour in India is in its rural areas, the availability and quality of schools is decrepit; in rural areas of India, claims the old UNICEF report, about 50% of government funded primary schools that existed in 1978-79 did not have a regular building, 40% lacked a blackboard, few have books, and 97% of funds for those publicly funded schools had been budgeted by the government as salaries for the teacher and administrators. A 2012 Wall Street Journal article, reports while the enrollment in India's school has dramatically increased in recent years to over 96% of all children in the 6–14-year age group, the infrastructure in schools, aimed in part to reduce child labour, remains poor – over 81,000 schools do not have a blackboard and about 42,000 government schools operate without a building with makeshift arrangements during monsoons and inclement weather.

Biggeri and Mehrotra have studied the macroeconomic factors that encourage child labour. They focus their study on India, Pakistan, Indonesia, Thailand and the Philippines. They suggest that child labour is a serious problem in all five, but it is not a new problem. Macroeconomic causes encouraged widespread child labour across the world, over most of human history. They suggest that the causes for child labour include both the demand and the supply side. While poverty and unavailability of good schools explain the child labour supply side, they suggest that the growth of low paying informal economy rather than higher paying formal economy – called organised economy in India – is amongst the causes of the demand side. India has rigid labour laws and numerous regulations that prevent growth of organised sector where work protections are easier to monitor, and work more productive and higher paying.

The unintended effect of Indian complex labour laws is the work has shifted to the unorganised, informal sector. As a result, after the unorganised agriculture sector which employs 60% of child labour, it is the unorganised trade, unorganised assembly and unorganised retail work that is the largest employer of child labour. If macroeconomic factors and laws prevent growth of formal sector, the family owned informal sector grows, deploying low cost, easy to hire, easy to dismiss labour in form of child labour. Even in situations where children are going to school, claim Biggeri and Mehrotra, children engage in routine after-school home-based manufacturing and economic activity. Other scholars too suggest that inflexibility and structure of India's labour market, size of informal economy, inability of industries to scale up and lack of modern manufacturing technologies are major macroeconomic factors affecting demand and acceptability of child labour.

Cigno et al. suggest the government planned and implemented land redistribution programs in India, where poor families were given small plots of land with the idea of enabling economic independence, have had the unintended effect of increased child labour. They find that smallholder plots of land are labour-intensively farmed since small plots cannot productively afford expensive farming equipment. In these cases, a means to increase output from the small plot has been to apply more labour, including child labour.

== Bonded child labour in India ==
Bonded child labour is a system of forced, or partly forced, labour under which the child, or child's parent enter into an agreement, oral or written, with a creditor. The child performs work as in-kind repayment of credit. In the 2005 ILO report, debt-bondage in India emerged during the colonial period, as a means of obtaining reliable cheap labour, with loan and land-lease relationships implemented during that era of Indian history. These were regionally called Hali, or Halwaha, or Jeura systems; and was named by the colonial administration as the indentured labour system. These systems included bonded child labour. Over time, claims the ILO report, this traditional forms of long-duration relationships have declined.

In 1977, India passed legislation that prohibits solicitation or use of bonded labour by anyone, of anyone including children. Evidence of continuing bonded child labour continue. A report by the Special Rapporteur to India's National Human Rights Commission, reported the discovery of 53 child labourers in 1996 in the state of Tamil Nadu during a surprise inspection. Each child or the parent had taken an advance of Rs. 1,00,000 to 2,50,000. The children were made to work for 12 to 14 hours a day and received only Rs. 2 to 3 per day as wages. According to an ILO report, the extent of bonded child labour is difficult to determine, but estimates from various social activist groups range up to 350,000 in 2001.

Despite its legislation, prosecutors in India rarely use the Bonded Labour System (Abolition) Act of 1976 to prosecute those responsible. According to one report, the prosecutors have no direction from the central government that if a child is found to be underpaid, the case should be prosecuted not only under the Minimum Wages Act, 1948 and the Child Labour (Prohibition & Regulation) Act, 1986, the case should include charges under the Bonded Labour Act of India. The few enforcement actions have had some unintended effects. While there has been a decrease in children working in factories because of enforcement and community vigilance committees, the report claims poverty still compels children and poor families to work. The factory lends money to whoever needs it, puts a loom in the person's home, and then the family with children works out of their homes, bring finished product to pay interest and get some wages. The bonded child and family labour operations were moving out of small urban factories into rural homes.

== Consequences of child labour ==
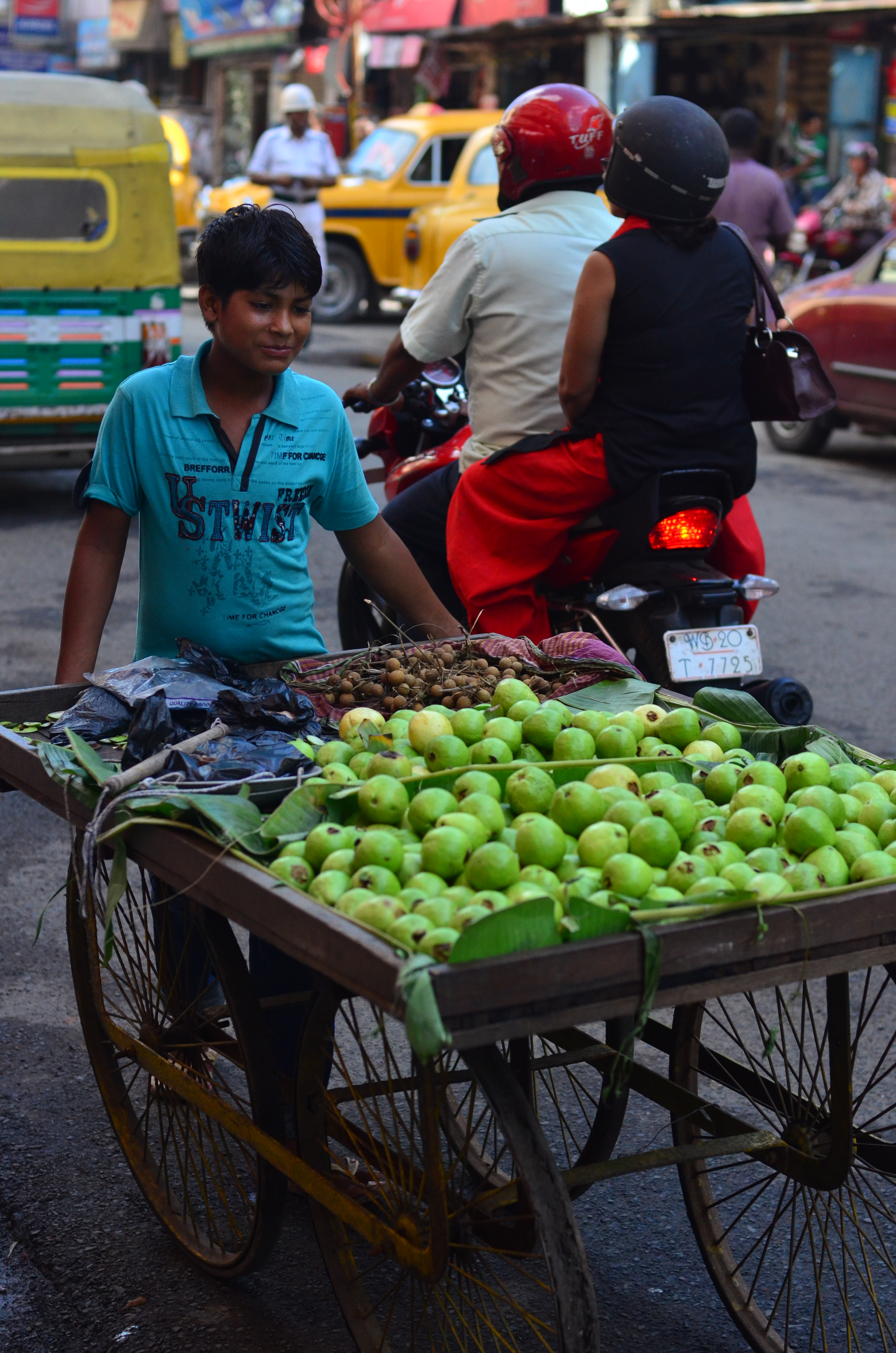
A young fruit seller in the streets of Kolkata

The presence of a large number of child labourers is regarded as a serious issue in terms of economic welfare. Children who work fail to get necessary education. They do not get the opportunity to develop physically, intellectually, emotionally and psychologically. In terms of the physical condition of children, children are not ready for long monotonous work because they become exhausted more quickly than adults. This reduces their physical conditions and makes the children more vulnerable to disease.

Children in hazardous working conditions are even in worse condition Children who work, instead of going to school, will remain illiterate which limits their ability to contribute to their own well-being as well as to the community they live in. Child labour has long term adverse effects for India.

Studies in economics show that long-term industrial growth depends on an educated workforce that has the skills businesses need. From this point of view, young people represent the foundation of a country's future workforce and economic potential. Research suggests that widespread child labor creates a direct trade-off by reducing the overall growth of this future human capital through a lower rate of capital accumulation.

Child labour in India are employed with the majority (70%) in agriculture some in low-skilled labour-intensive sectors such as sari weaving or as domestic helpers, which require neither formal education nor training, but some in heavy industry such as coal mining.

According to the International Labour Organization (ILO), there are tremendous economic benefits for developing nations by sending children to school instead of work. Without education, children do not gain necessary skills such as literacy and technical aptitude that would increase their productivity to enable them to secure higher-skilled jobs in future with higher wages that will lift them out of poverty.

=== Diamond industry ===
In the year 1999, the International Labour Organization co-published a report with Universal Alliance of Diamond Workers, a trade union. The ILO report claimed that child labour is prevalent in the Indian diamond industry. International Confederation of Free Trade Unions (ICFTU) in a separate 1997 press release observed that child labour continued to flourish in India's diamond industry. Not everyone agreed with these claims. The South Gujarat Diamond Workers Association, another trade union, acknowledged child labour is present but it is not systematic, is less than 1% and against local industry norms. Local diamond industry businessmen too downplayed these charges.

According to the 1999 ILO paper, India annually cuts and polishes 60 percent of the world's diamonds by weight, or 40 percent by value. Additionally, India contributes 95 percent of the emeralds, 85 percent of the rubies, and 65 percent of the sapphires worldwide. India processes these diamonds and gems using traditional labour-intensive methods. About 1.5 million people are employed in the diamond industry, mostly in the unorganised sector. The industry is fragmented into small units, each employing a few workers. The industry has not scaled up, organised, and big operators absent.

The ILO paper claims that this is to avoid the complex labour laws of India. The export order is split, work is subcontracted through many middlemen, and most workers do not know the name of enterprise with the export order. In this environment, claims the ILO report, exact number of child labourers in India's diamond and gem industry is unknown; they estimate that child labourers in 1997 were between 10,000 and 20,000 out of 1.5 million total workers (about 1 in 100). The ILO report claims the causes for child labour include parents who send their children to work because they see education as expensive, education quality offering no real value, while artisan work in diamond and gem industry to be more remunerative as the child grows up.

A more recent study from 2005, conducted at 663 manufacturing units at 21 different locations in India's diamond and gem industry, claims incidence rates of child labour have dropped to 0.31%.

=== Fireworks manufacture ===
The town of Sivakasi in South India, known for its fireworks and matchsticks industries, has been reported to employ child labour in the production of fireworks. In 2011, Sivakasi, Tamil Nadu was home to over 9,500 firecracker factories and produced almost 100 percent of total fireworks output in India. The fireworks industry employed about 150,000 people at an average of 15 employees per factory. Most of these were in unorganized sector, with a few registered and organized companies.

In 1989, Shubh Bhardwaj reported that child labour is present in India's fireworks industry, and safety practices poor. Child labour is common in small shed operation in the unorganized sector. Only 4 companies scaled up and were in the organized sector with over 500 employees; the larger companies did not employ children and had superior safety practices and resources. The child labour in small, unorganized sector operations suffered long working hours, low wages, unsafe conditions and tiring schedules.

A more recent 2002 report by international labour organization (ILO), claims that child labour is significant in Tamil Nadu's fireworks, matches or incense sticks industries. However, these children do not work in the formal economy and corporate establishments that produce for export. The child labourers in manufacturing typically toil in supply chains producing for the domestic market of fireworks, matches or incense sticks. The ILO report claims that as the demand for these products has grown, the formal economy and corporate establishments have not expanded to meet the demand, rather home-based production operations have mushroomed. This has increased the potential of child labour. Such hidden operations make research and effective action difficult, suggests ILO.

=== Silk manufacture ===
A 2003 Human Rights Watch report, claims children as young as five years old are employed and work for up to 12 hours a day and six to seven days a week in silk industry. These children, claims, are bonded labour; even though the government of India denies existence of bonded child labour, these silk industries children are easy to find in Karnataka and Tamil Nadu, claims Children are forced to dip their hands in scalding water to palpate the cocoons and are often paid less than Rs 10 per day.

In 2012, a German news investigative report claimed that in states like Karnataka, non-governmental organisations had found up to 15,000 children working in the 1,100 silk factories in 1998. In other places, thousands of bonded child labourers were present in 1995. But today, after UNICEF and NGOs got involved, child labour figure is drastically lower, with the total estimated to be fewer than a thousand child labourers. The released children were back in school, claims the report.

=== Carpet weaving ===
Siddartha Kara finds about 20% of carpets manufactured in India could involve child labour. He notes, "determining the extent to which the hand-made carpet supply chain from India to the U.S.A. is tainted by slavery and child labour requires an additional exercise in supply chain tracing." Kara's study also finds variation in child labour practices between ethnic and religious groups. Kara and colleagues report highest level of child labour in Muslim community carpet operations, and the presence of debt bonded child labourers in Muslim villages.

=== Domestic labour ===
Official estimates for child labour working as domestic labour and in restaurants is more than 2,500,000 while NGOs estimate the figure to be around 20 million. The Government of India expanded the coverage of The Child Labour Prohibition and Regulation Act and banned the employment of children as domestic workers and as workers in restaurants, dhabas, hotels, spas and resorts effective from 10 October 2006.

=== Mining ===
Despite laws enacted in 1952 which prohibited employment of people under the age of 18, primitive coal mines in Meghalaya were caught employing children under the age of 18. This caught the attention of international media in 2013.

=== Brick kilns ===
A large number of brick kilns around Bangalore and Hosur employ bonded and child labour, under the pretext of offering high wages. In 2018, 22 bonded labourers including children were rescued from a brick kiln near Anekal in Bangalore and the employers were arrested by the police. The employers allegedly provided poor food and working conditions.

== Initiatives against child labour in India ==
In 1979, the Indian government formed the Gurupadswamy Committee to find about child labour and means to tackle it. The Child Labour Prohibition and Regulation Act was enacted based on the recommendations of the committee in 1986. A National Policy on Child Labour was formulated in 1987 to focus on rehabilitating children working in hazardous occupations. The Ministry of Labour and Employment had implemented around 100 industry-specific National Child Labour Projects to rehabilitate the child workers since 1988.

The Indian government has enacted a plethora of acts, laws, organizations, and institutions to combat the overwhelming prominence of child labour. Some of the initiatives include the Child Labour Prohibition and Regulation Act which is a piece of legislation that prohibits the engagement of children in certain employment (mostly in dangerous conditions) and regulates the conditions of work of children; the National Policy on Child Labour seeks to adopt a sequential approach with focus on rehabilitation of children working in hazardous occupations & processes in the first instance; and the Ministry of Labour and employment functions to provide and supervise a range of policies concerning child labor in India. Furthermore, as reported by Osment, NGOs such as Care India, Child Rights and You, Global March against Child Labour have been implemented to combat child labour through education and accessibility to resources. However, these efforts have been largely unsuccessful.

Child labour free zones have been promoted in India: a child labour free zone (CLFZ) is "a defined area, such as a village or a plantation, where everyone is convinced that 'No child should be working, every child should be in school!' The concept was introduced in 1992 by an Indian organisation, the Mamidipudi Venkatarangaiya Foundation (MVFoundation).

=== Non-governmental organisations ===
Many NGOs like Bachpan Bachao Andolan, ChildFund, CARE India, Talaash Association, Child Rights and You, Global march against child labour, Bundelkhand matra bhumi samaj sevi sansthan project stop working with child labour in India, GoodWeave India, RIDE India, Childline etc. have been working to eradicate child labour in India.

Child labour has also been a subject of public interest litigations in Indian courts.

== Demography of child labour ==
In India, millions of children are forced into child labour due to poverty, high illiteracy rates due to lack of education, unemployment, overpopulation, etc.

As reported by Save the Children, children between the ages of 14 and 17 years engage in hazardous work and account for 62.8% of India's child labour workforce in which more boys than girls (38.7 million vs. 8.8 million) are forced into doing more hazardous work. Child labour used to be most ubiquitous in rural India in which 80% of working children found work. Recently, however, child labour has relocated from rural areas to urbanized areas where the big cities are located. Larger cities provide more opportunity for work compared to smaller, rural areas. As reported by UNICEF, there has been a 54% increase in child labor in urbanized areas for children between the ages of 5 and 14. In addition, according to a Campaign Against Child Labour study, India has approximately 12 666 377 child labourers total. Uttar Pradesh, a state in northern India, has 19,27,997 child labourers. Delhi, the capital of India, has over 1 million child labourers. Other leading states with similar figures include Bihar, Rajasthan, Maharashtra, Madhya Pradesh and Uttar Pradesh.

According to 2005 Government of India NSSO (National Sample Survey Org.), child labour incidence rates in India is highest among Muslim Indians, about 40% higher than Hindu Indians. Child labour was found to be present in other minority religions of India but at significantly lower rates. Across caste classification, the children had child labour incidence rates of 2.8%, statistically similar to the nationwide average of 2.74%. Tribal populations, however, had higher child labour rates at 3.8%. India has the highest number of children stunted because of malnutrition (48.2 million) equivalent to Colombia's population, according to Save the Children's 'Stolen Childhoods' report. 31 million children are part of India's workforce, the highest number in the world. A minute analysis of the available child labour data reveals that a greater number of children in the age group of 5–14 years are engaged in agricultural labour in rural India.

== See also ==
- Bonded Labour System (Abolition) Act, 1976
- Child and Adolescent Labour (Prohibition and Regulation) Act, 1986
- Child labour in Eswatini
- Child trafficking in India
- Criticism of capitalism
- Modified Scheme of Elementary education 1953
- Odisha State Child Protection Society
- Slavery in India
