= Child Labor Act =

Child Labor Act may refer to:

- Child Labour (Prohibition and Regulation) Act, India
- Keating–Owen Act, United States
