= Retailing in India =

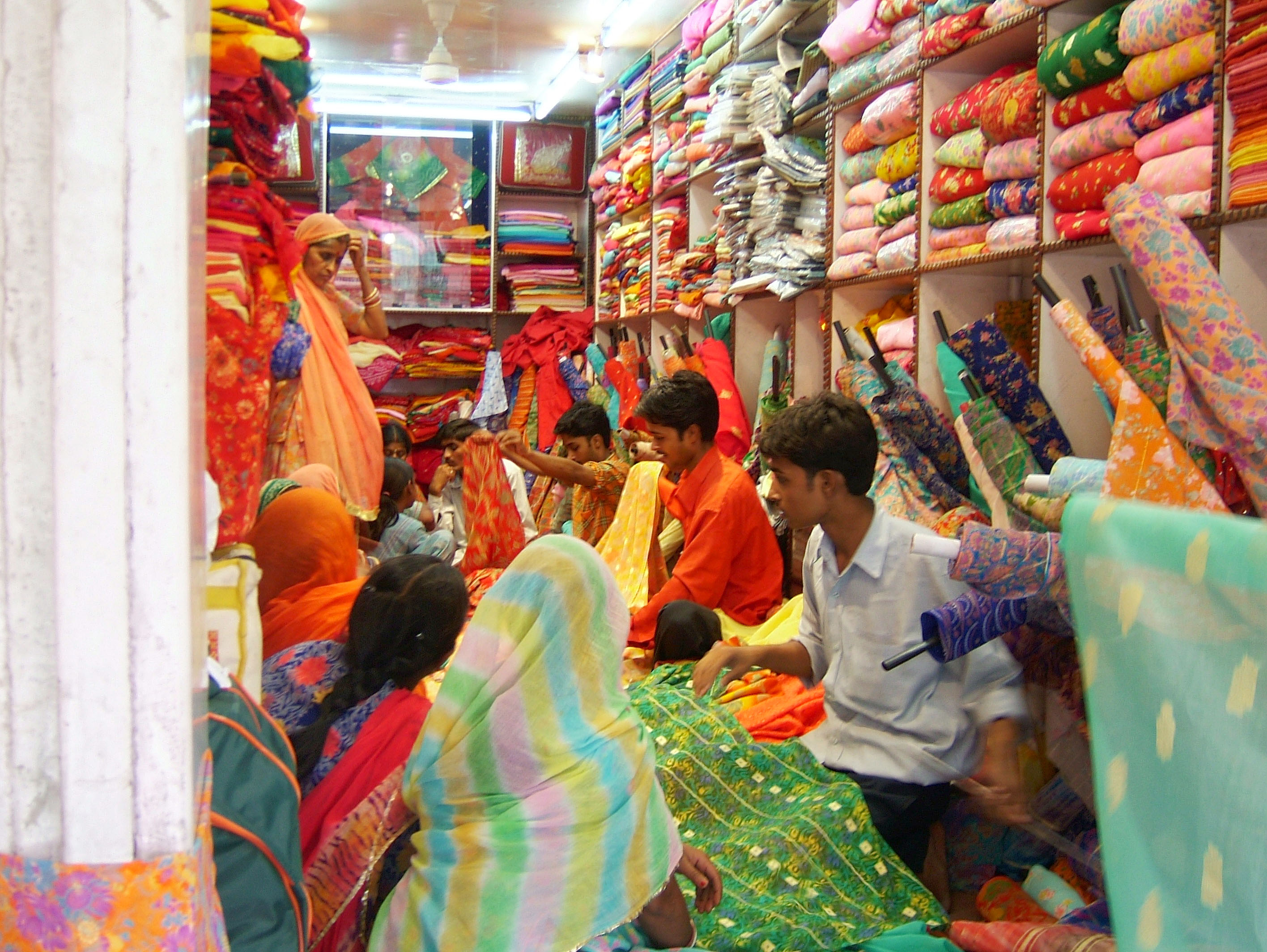
A textile retail store in India

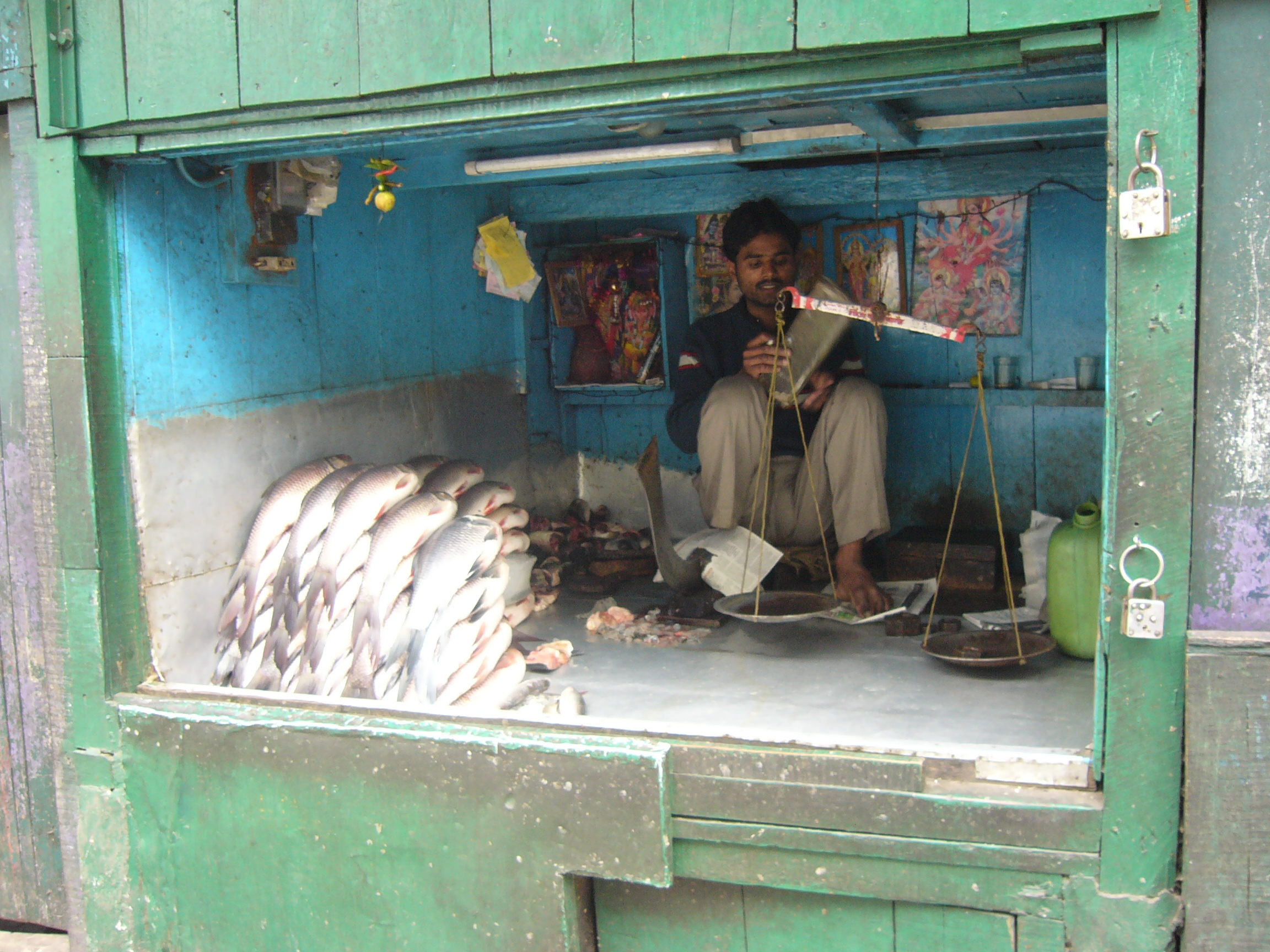
A fish retail store in West Bengal, India

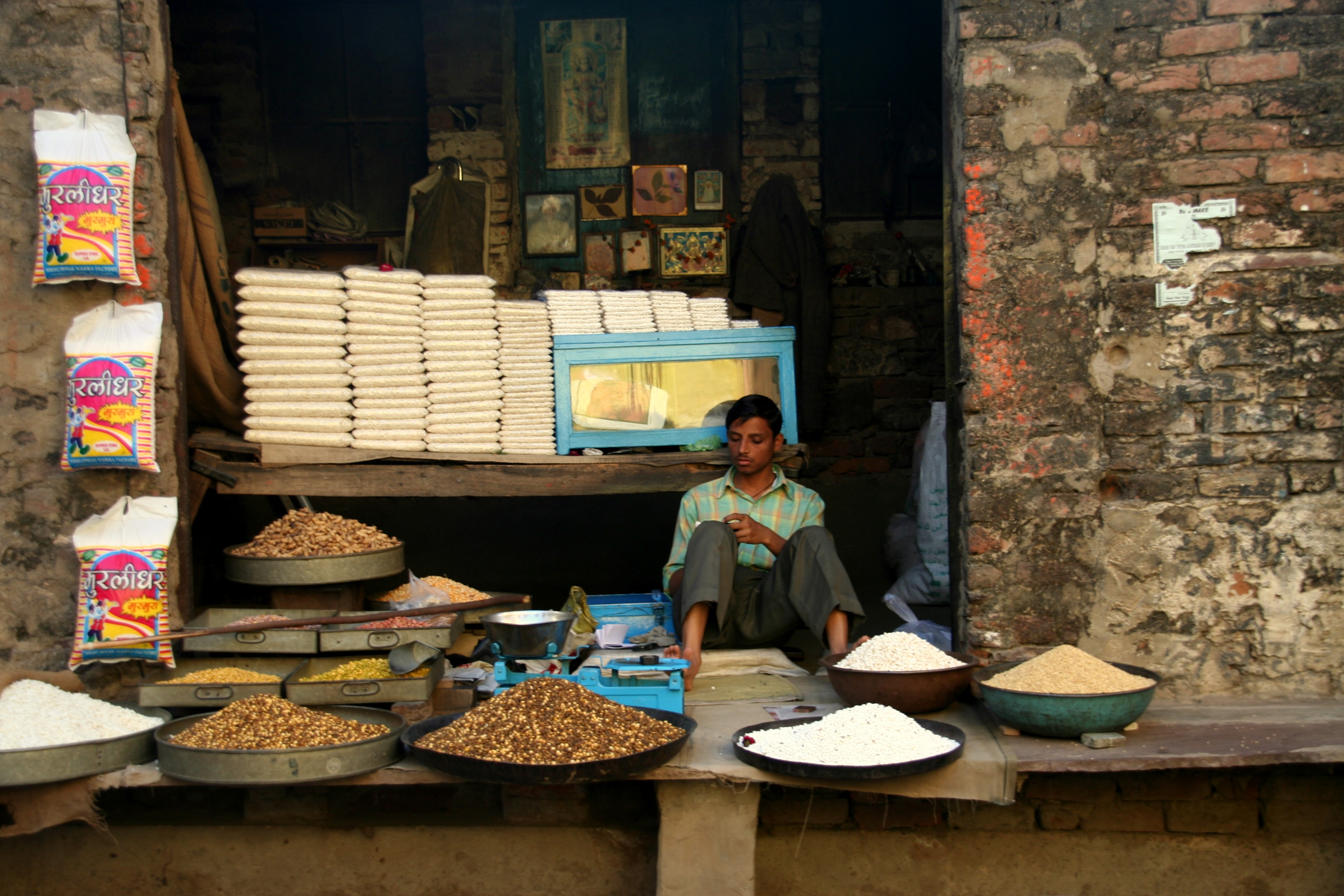
A food staple retail shop in Pushkar, India

Modern retailing in India

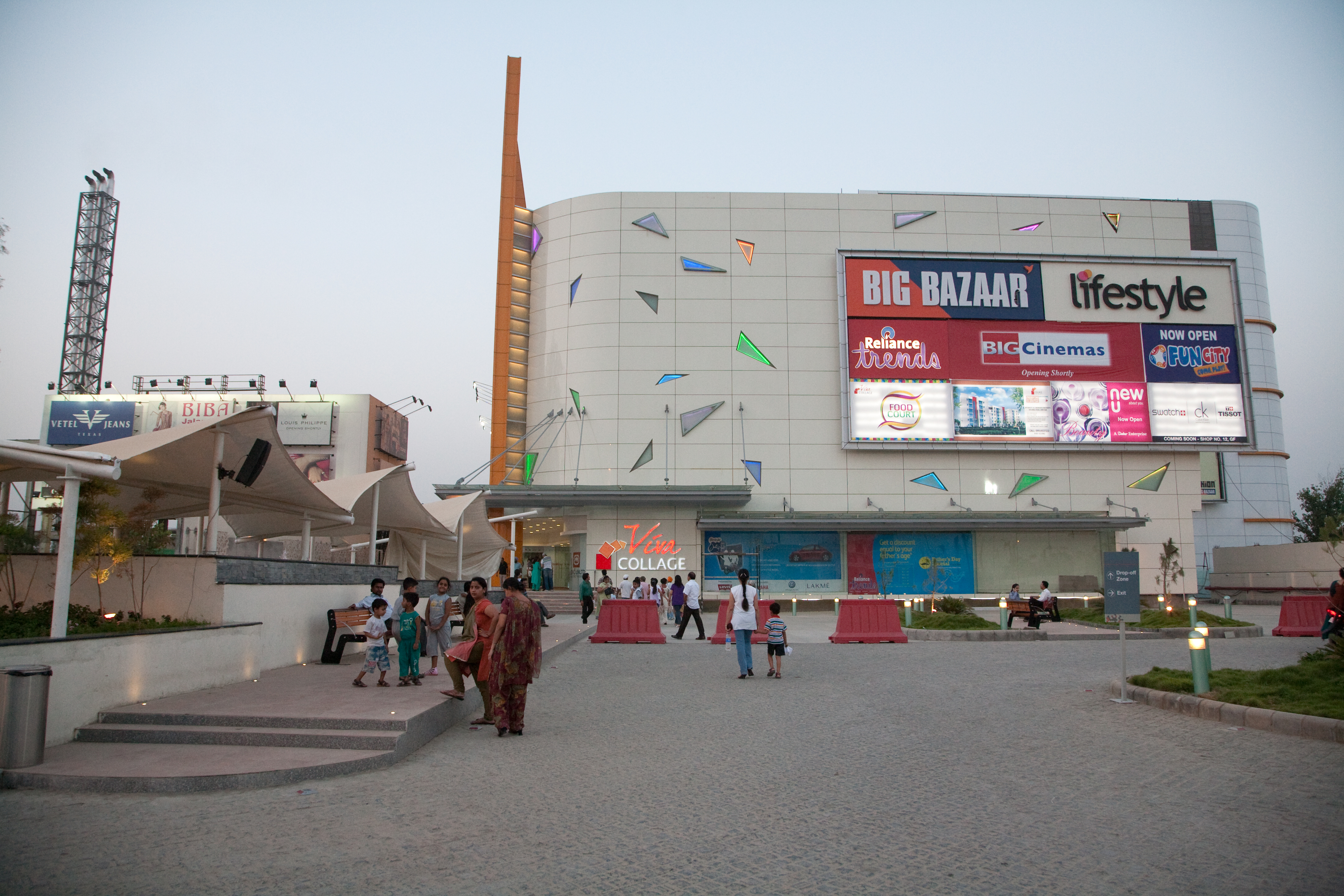
Punjab

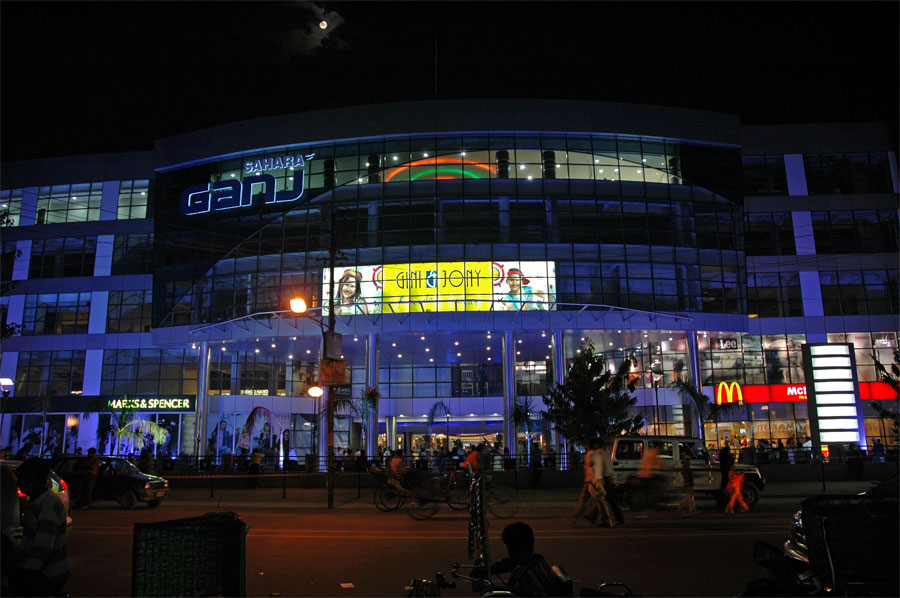
Uttar Pradesh

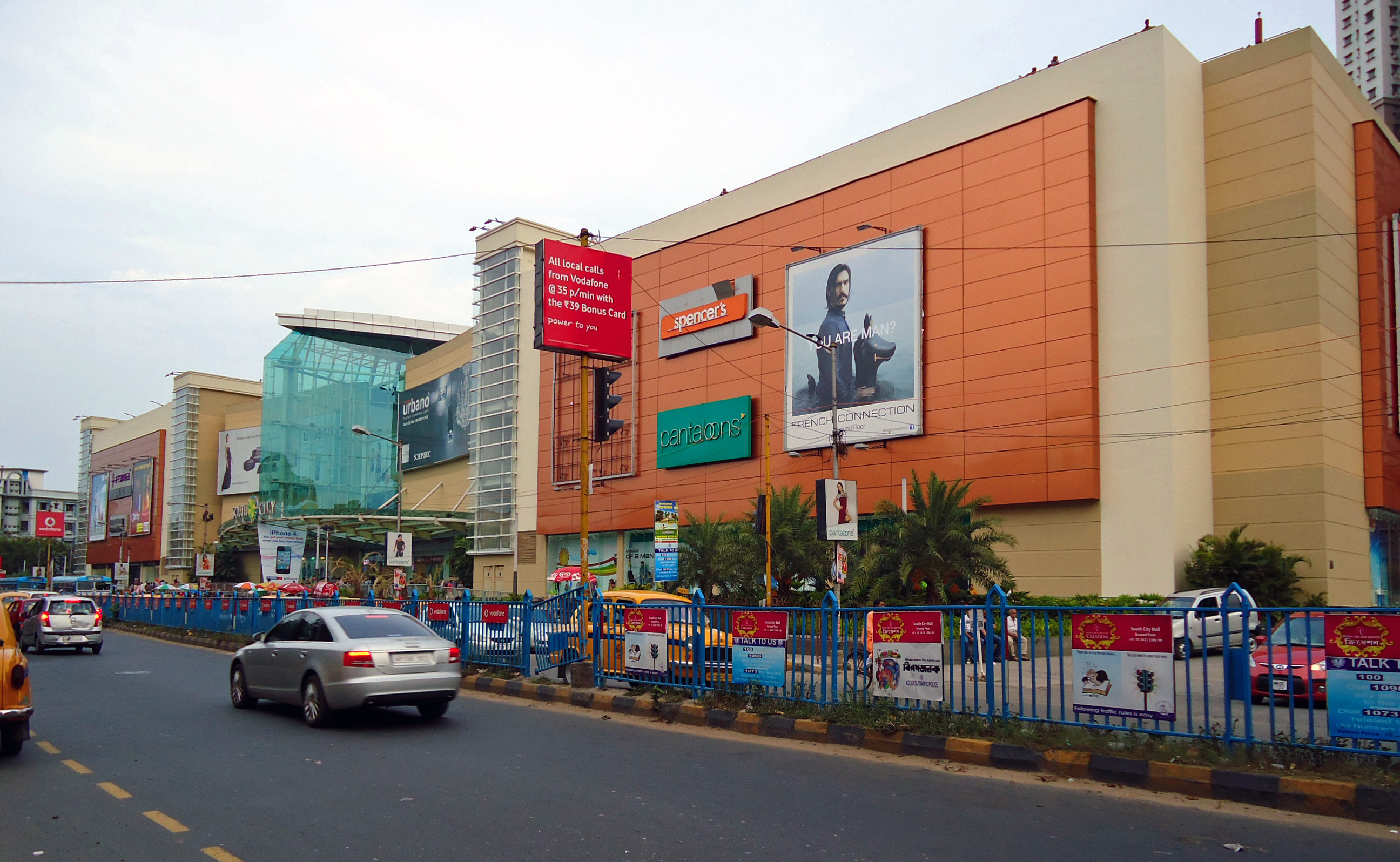
West Bengal

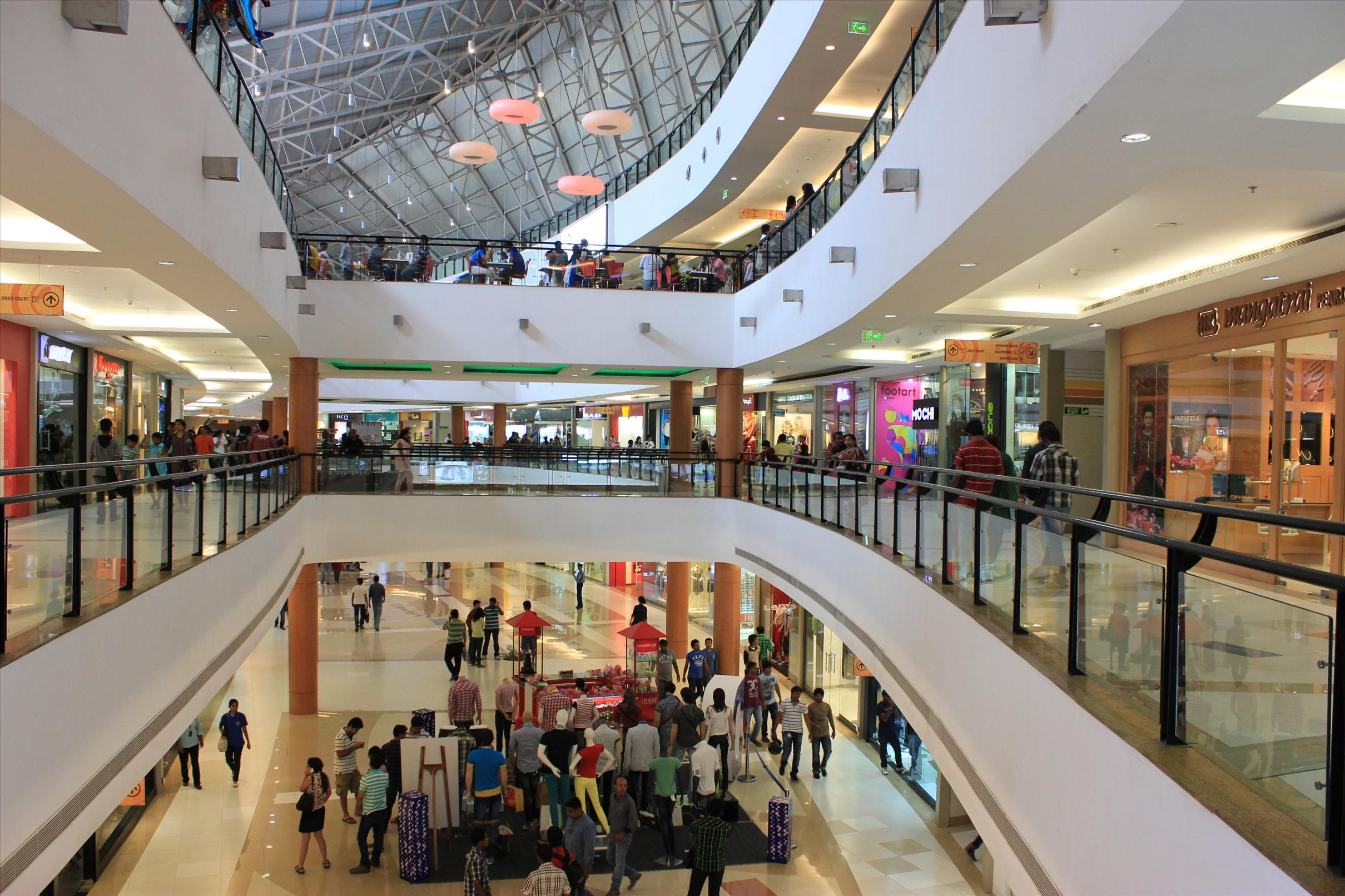
Telangana

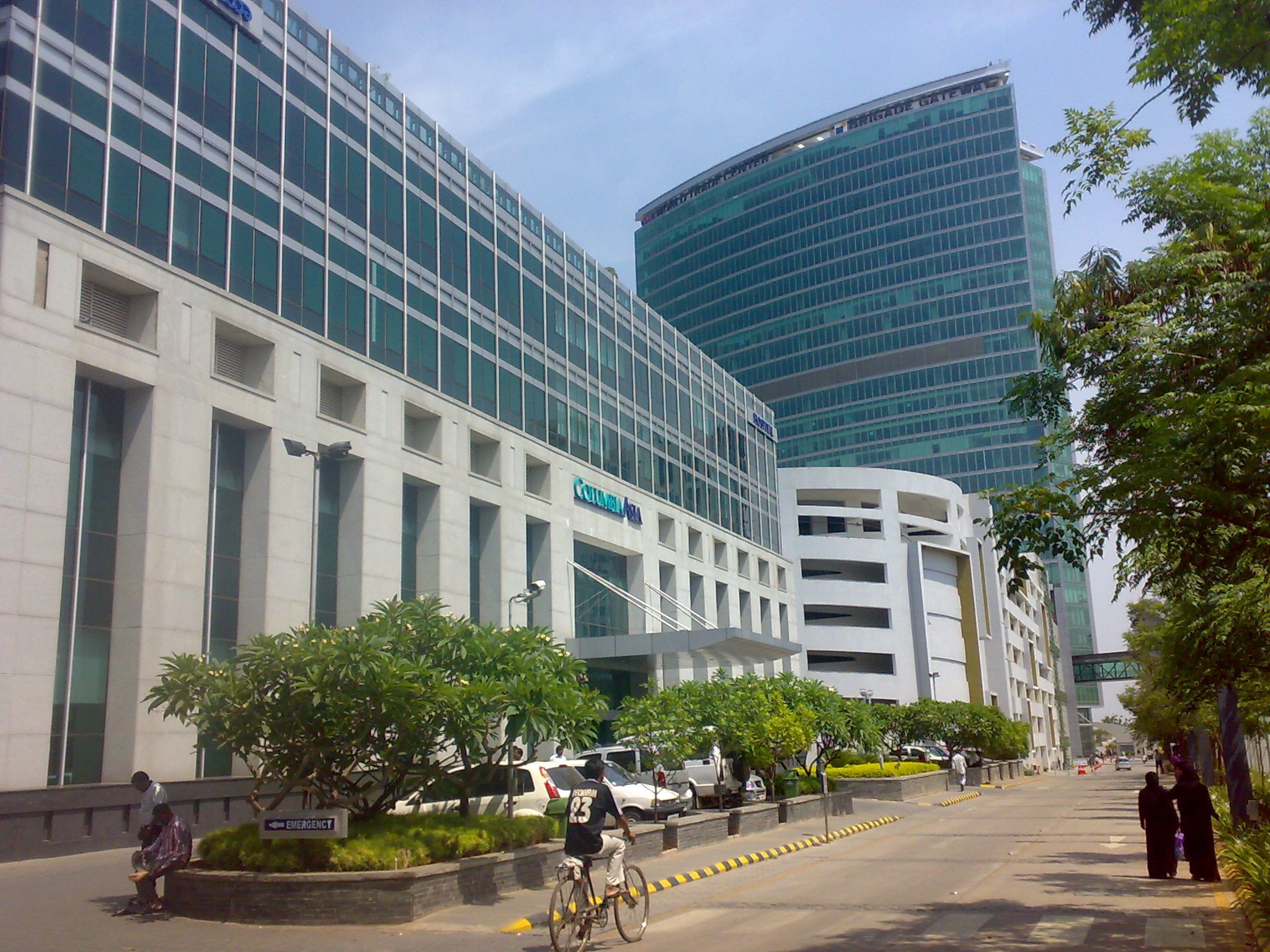
Karnataka

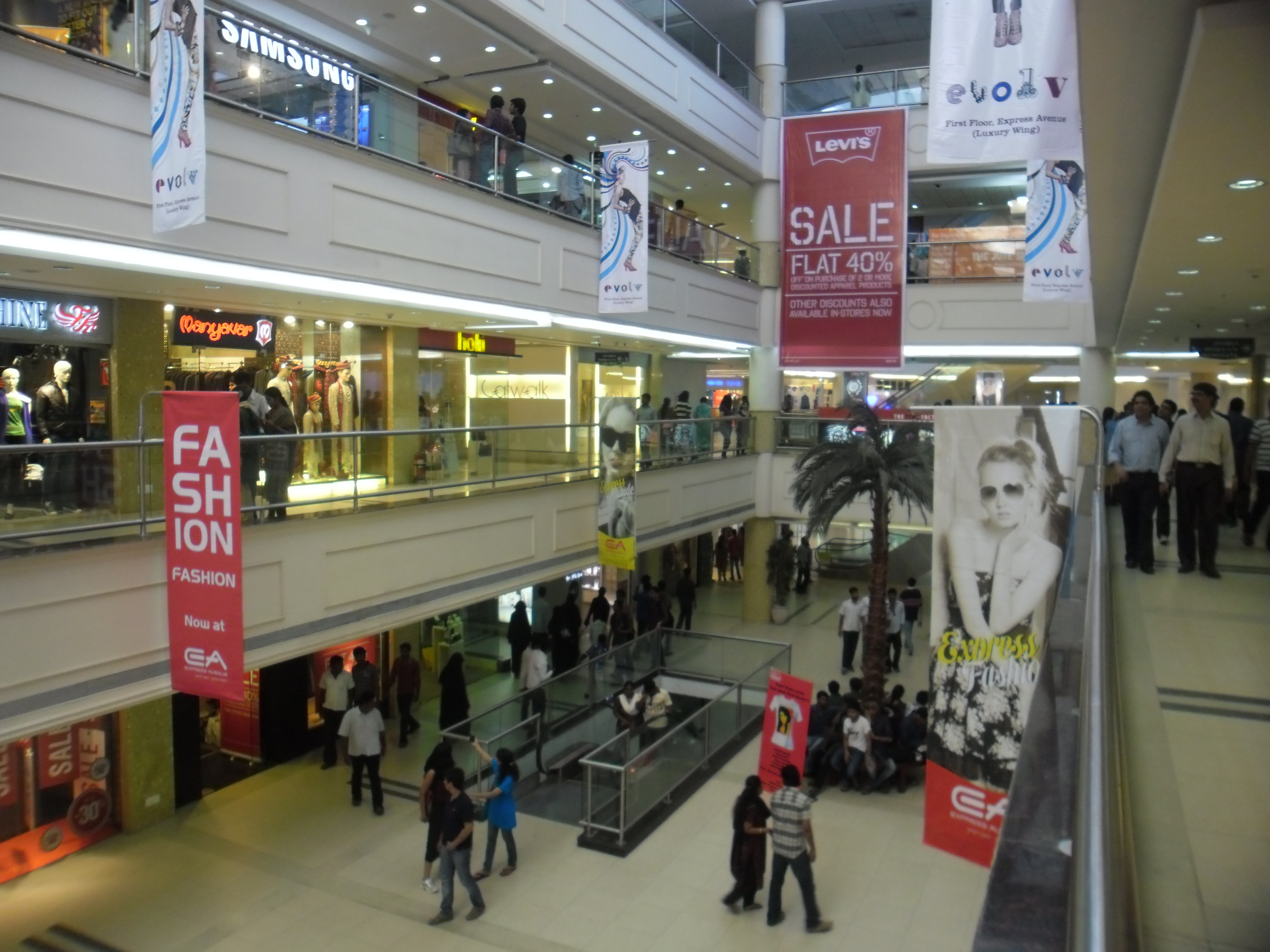
Tamil Nadu

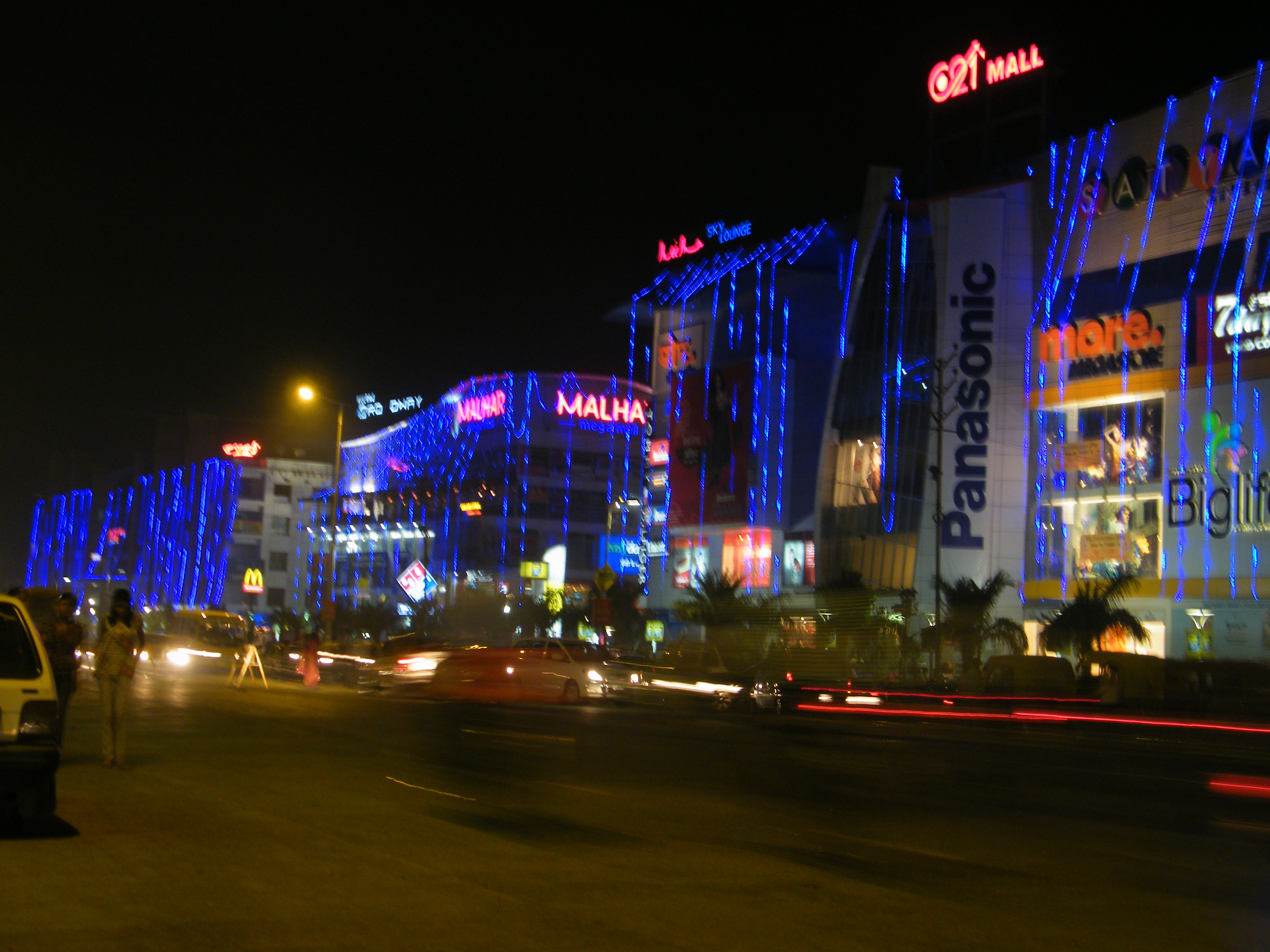
Madhya Pradesh

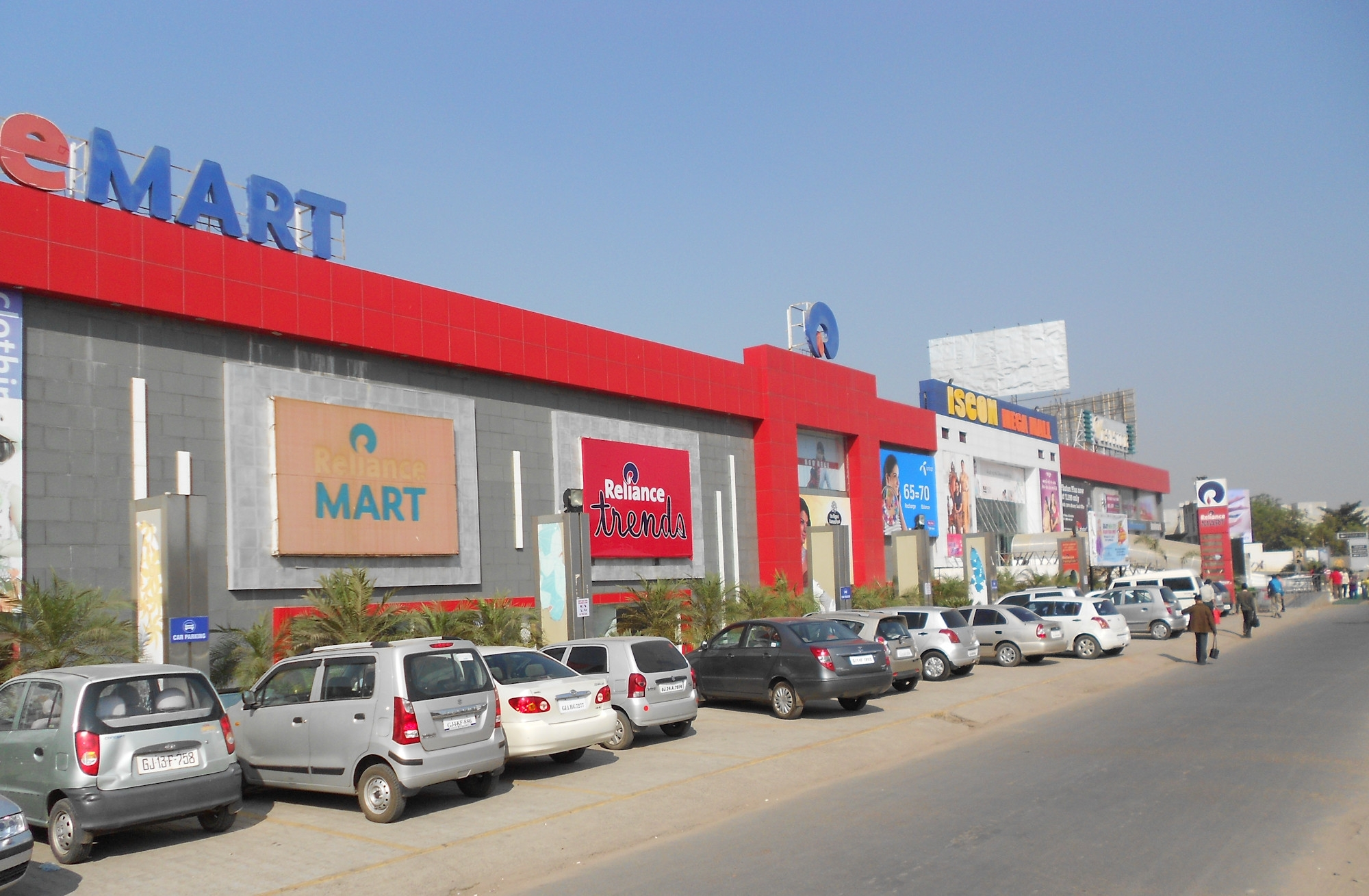
Gujarat

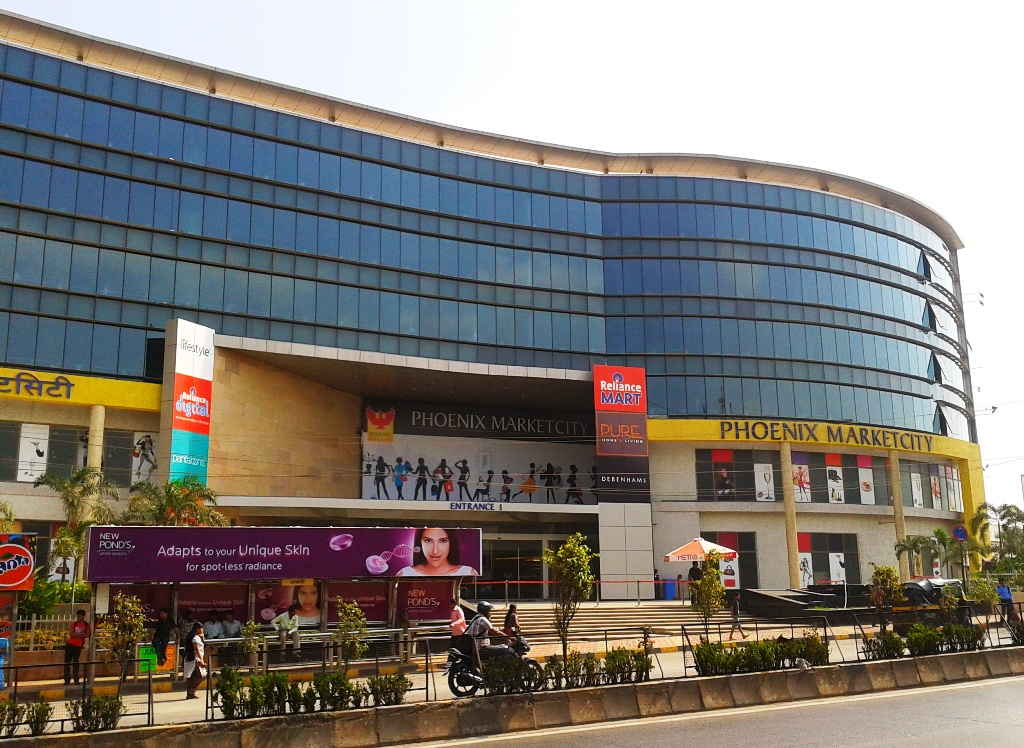
Maharashtra

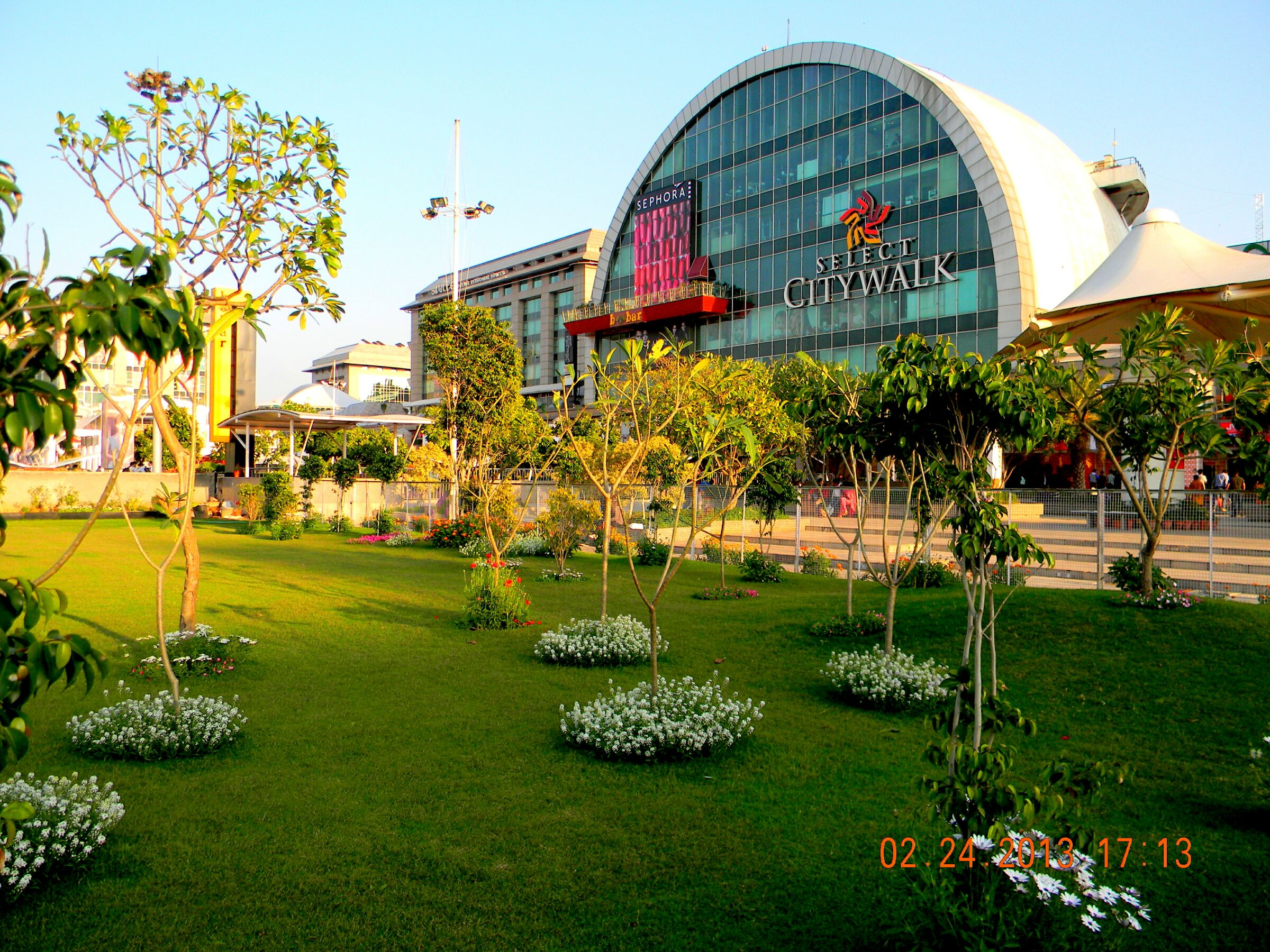
Delhi

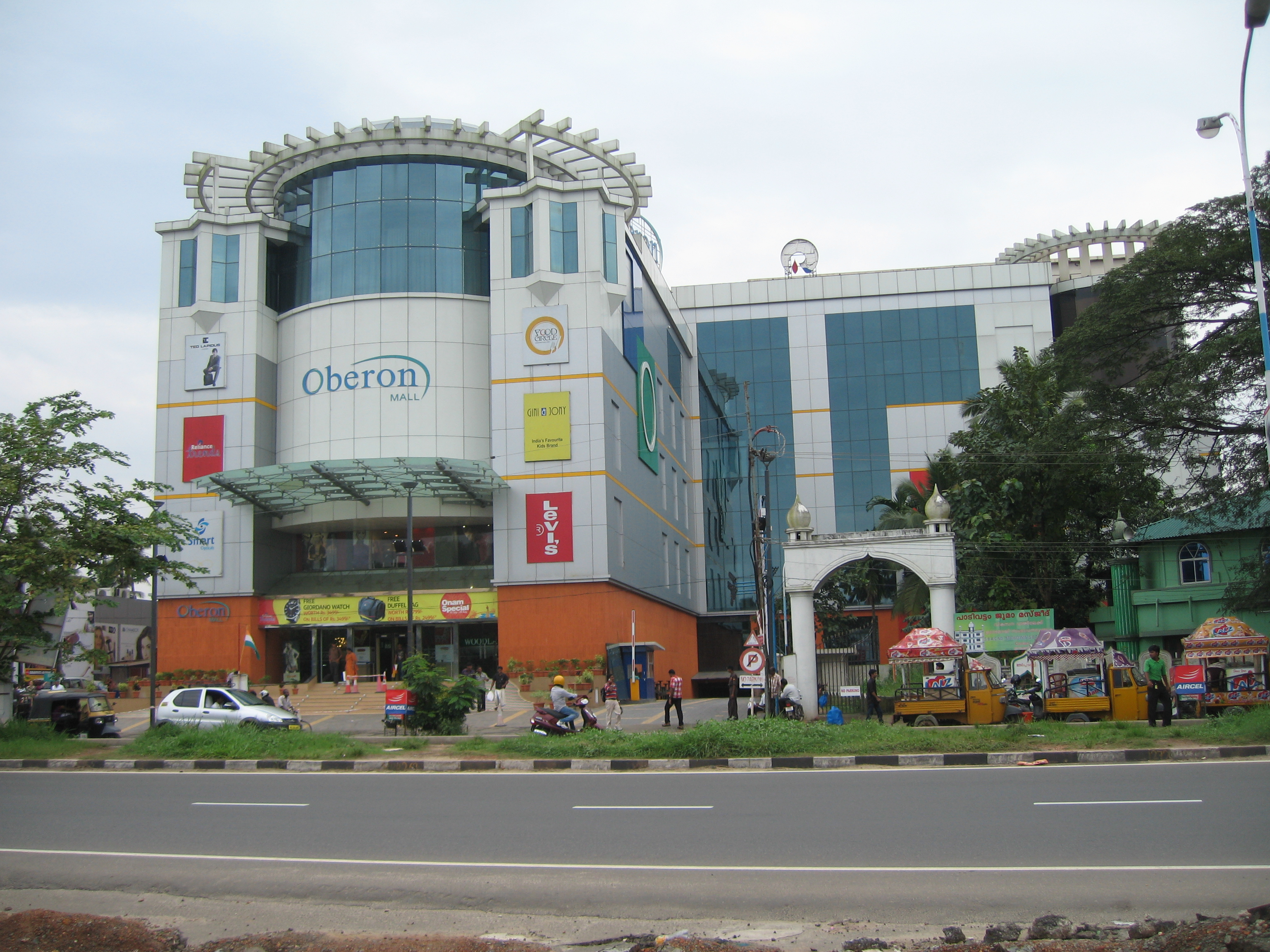
Kerala

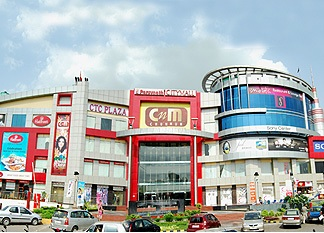
Haryana

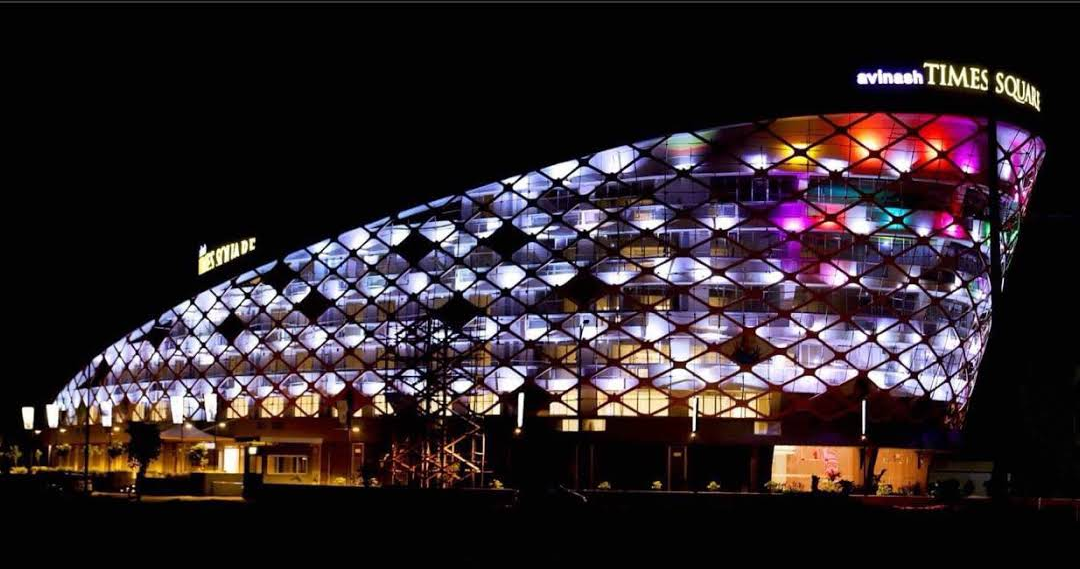
Chhattisgarh

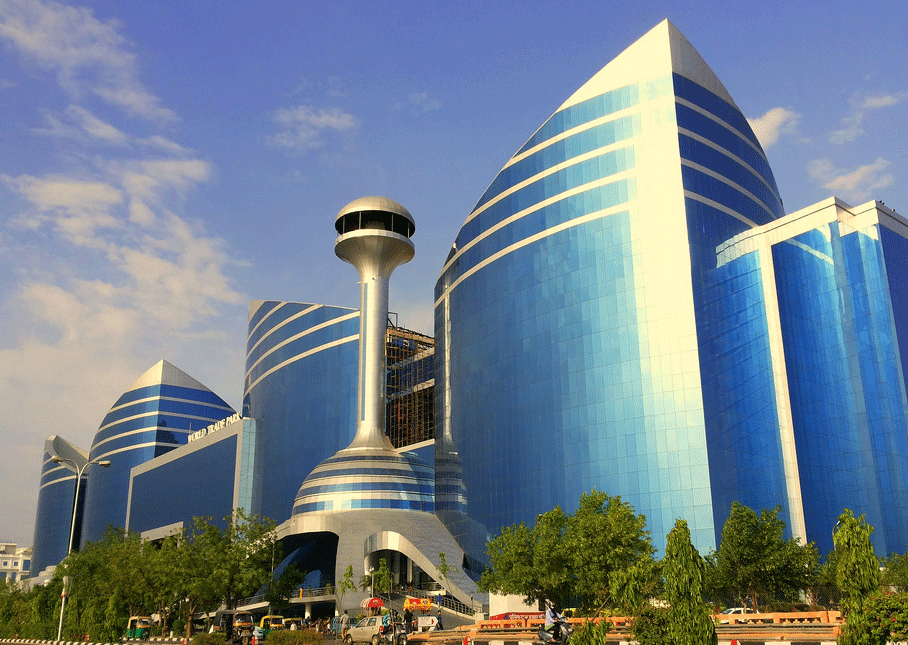
Rajasthan

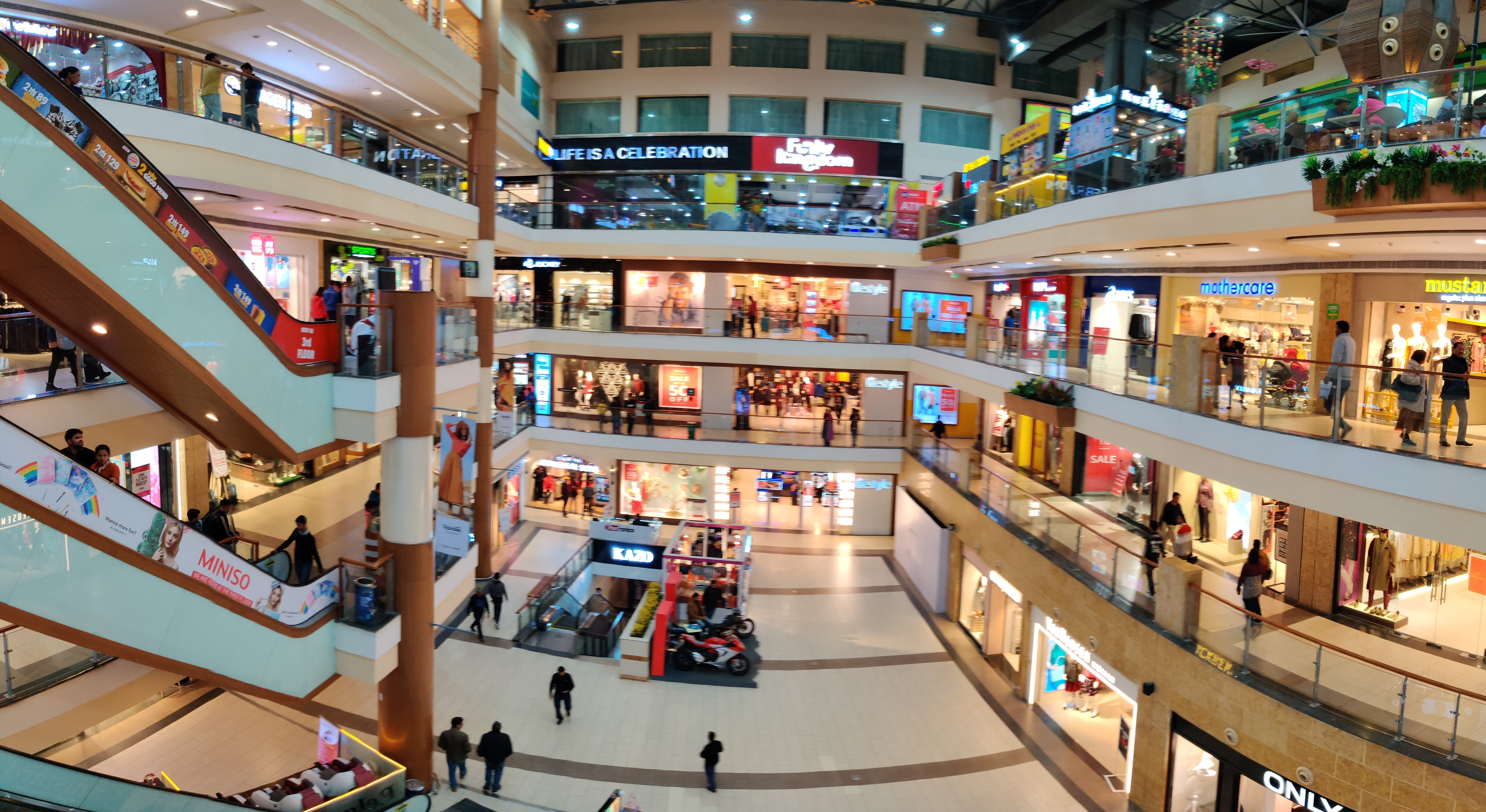
Uttrakhand

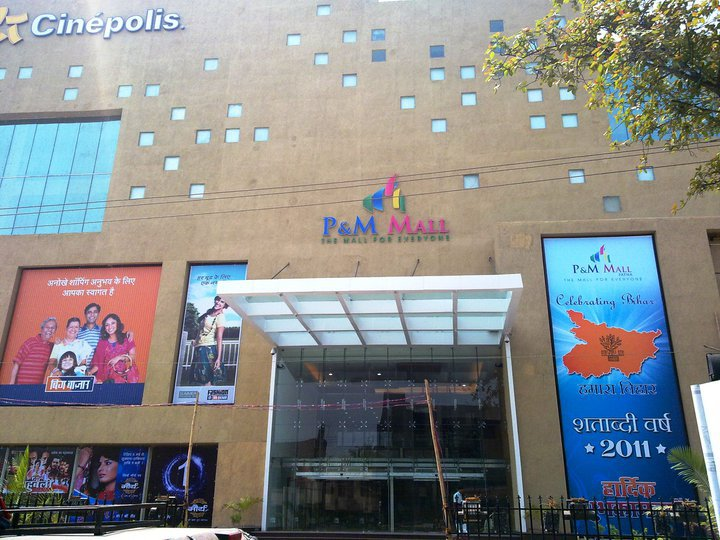
Bihar

Retailing in India is a pillar of the national economy, accounting for over 10 percent of the country's GDP and around 8 percent of total employment. The Indian retail market is one of the world's largest consumer markets, valued at approximately US$1.18 trillion as of 2025, and is projected to reach US$1.6 trillion by 2030. India is one of the fastest-growing retail markets globally, driven by a population of over 1.4 billion people and rapid e-commerce adoption. The Indian online retail sector is a major growth driver, crossing US$90 billion in 2026 and expected to reach US$345 billion by 2030.

As of 2003, India's retailing industry was essentially owner staffed small shops. In 2010, larger format convenience stores and supermarkets accounted for about 4 percent of the industry, and these were present only in large urban centers. India's retail and logistics industry employs about 40 million Indians (3.3% of Indian population). In November 2011, India's central government announced retail reforms for both multi-brand stores and single-brand stores. These market reforms paved the way for retail innovation and competition with multi-brand retailers such as Walmart, Carrefour and Tesco, as well single brand majors such as IKEA, Nike, and Apple. The announcement sparked intense activism, both in opposition and in support of the reforms. In December 2011, under pressure from the opposition, Indian government placed the retail reforms on hold until a consensus was reached.

In January 2012, India approved reforms for single-brand stores welcoming anyone in the world to innovate in Indian retail market with 100% ownership, but imposed the requirement that the single brand retailer source 30 percent of its goods from India. Indian government continues the hold on retail reforms for multi-brand stores. In June 2012, IKEA announced it had applied for permission to invest $1.9 billion in India and set up 25 retail stores. An analyst from Fitch Group stated that the 30 percent requirement was likely to significantly delay if not prevent most single brand majors from Europe, USA and Japan from opening stores and creating associated jobs in India.

On 14 September 2012, the government of India announced the opening of FDI in multi-brand retail, subject to approvals by individual states. On 20 September 2012, the Government of India formally notified the FDI reforms for single and multi brand retail, thereby making it effective under Indian law.

== Local terms ==
The National Commission for Enterprises in the Unorganized Sector (NCEUS) defines Unorganized sector as

'Unorganized Sector is a Sector consisting of all unincorporated private enterprises owned by individuals or households engaged in the sale or production of goods and services operated on a proprietary or partnership basis and with less than ten total workers.'

Based on this definition, Organized sector in India is defined as

'Organized sector is a sector consisting of all incorporated enterprises which are engaged in the sales or production of goods and services operated as private limited or limited organizations governed by Companies act and having more than ten total workers.'

With this definition, Organized Retail Sector will be characterized as:

- Company-owned retail setups
- Part of the employees are on the direct payroll of the company (some may be on the contract also)
- Employees will be governed by minimum wages act
- These outlets can be "standalone company owned showroom" or "The retail space" in any of the super market or mall, etc.
- Practically, there may be less than ten worker though

Organised retailing, in India, refers to trading activities undertaken by licensed retailers, that is, those who are registered for sales tax, income tax, etc. These include the publicly traded supermarkets, corporate-backed hypermarkets and retail chains, and also the privately owned traditional large retail businesses who constantly keep upgrading to the market dynamics and change like Saravana Stores, Pothys, The Chennai Silks who operate in a specific region or a part of the country. Dynamics of retail are quite different in India, owing to different climatic and cultural and language differences in the demographic profile.

Unorganised retailing, on the other hand, refers to the traditional formats of low-cost retailing, for example, the local corner shops, owner staffed general stores, paan/beedi shops, convenience stores, hand cart and pavement vendors, etc.

Organised retailing actively started with the entry of Shoppers Stop, Westside, Pantaloons, Pyramid - Crossroad, all being department store formats in the mid to late 1990s and was absent in most rural and small towns of India till 2010. Supermarkets and similar organised retail accounted for just 4% of the market.

Most Indian shopping happens in open markets or numerous small grocery and retail shops. Shoppers typically wait outside the shop, ask for what they want, and can not pick or examine a product from the shelf. Access to the shelf or product storage area is limited. Once the shopper requests the food staple or household product they are looking for, the shopkeeper goes to the container or shelf or to the back of the store, brings it out and offers it for sale to the shopper. Often the shopkeeper may substitute the product, claiming that it is similar or equivalent to the product the consumer is asking for. The product typically has no price label in these small retail shops; all packaged products must display the maximum retail price (MRP) above which the product cannot be sold. It is a criminal offence to sell a product beyond the MRP of a product. The shopkeeper can price the food staple and household products arbitrarily, and two consumers may pay different prices for the same product on the same day but never will those price be above the maximum retail price. Price is rarely negotiated between the shopper and shopkeeper. The shoppers usually do not have time to examine the product label, and do not have a choice to make an informed decision between competitive products.

India's retail and logistics industry, organised and unorganized in combination, employs about 40 million Indians (3.3% of Indian population). The typical Indian retail shops are very small. Over 19 million(as of 2020) outlets operate in the country and only 4% of them being larger than 500 sq ft (46 m^{2}) in size. India has about 11 shop outlets for every 1000 people. Vast majority of the unorganized retail shops in India employ family members, do not have the scale to procure or transport products at high volume wholesale level, have limited to no quality control or fake-versus-authentic product screening technology and have no training on safe and hygienic storage, packaging or logistics. The unorganized retail shops source their products from a chain of middlemen who mark up the product as it moves from farmer or producer to the consumer. The unorganized retail shops typically offer no after-sales support or service. Finally, most transactions at unorganised retail shops are done with cash, with all sales being final.

Until the 1990s, regulations prevented innovation and entrepreneurship in Indian retailing. Some retailers faced the challenge of complying with over thirty regulations, such as "signboard licenses" and "anti-hoarding measures," before they could open their doors. There were taxes on moving goods to states, from states, and even within states in some cases. Farmers and producers had to go through middlemen monopolies. Logistics and infrastructure were very poor, with losses exceeding 30 percent.

Through the 1990s, India introduced widespread free-market reforms, including some related to retail. Between 2000 and 2010, consumers in select Indian cities gradually began to experience the quality, choice, convenience, and benefits of the organized retail industry.

== Growth ==
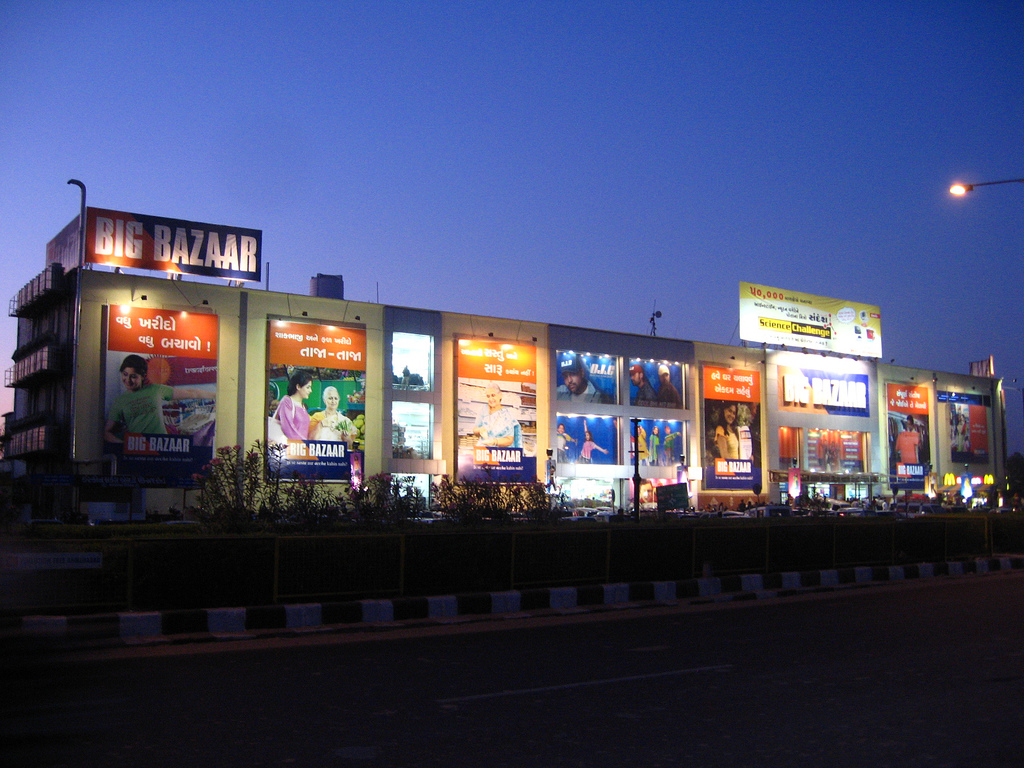
An organised retail store in Ahmedabad (ca. 2009)

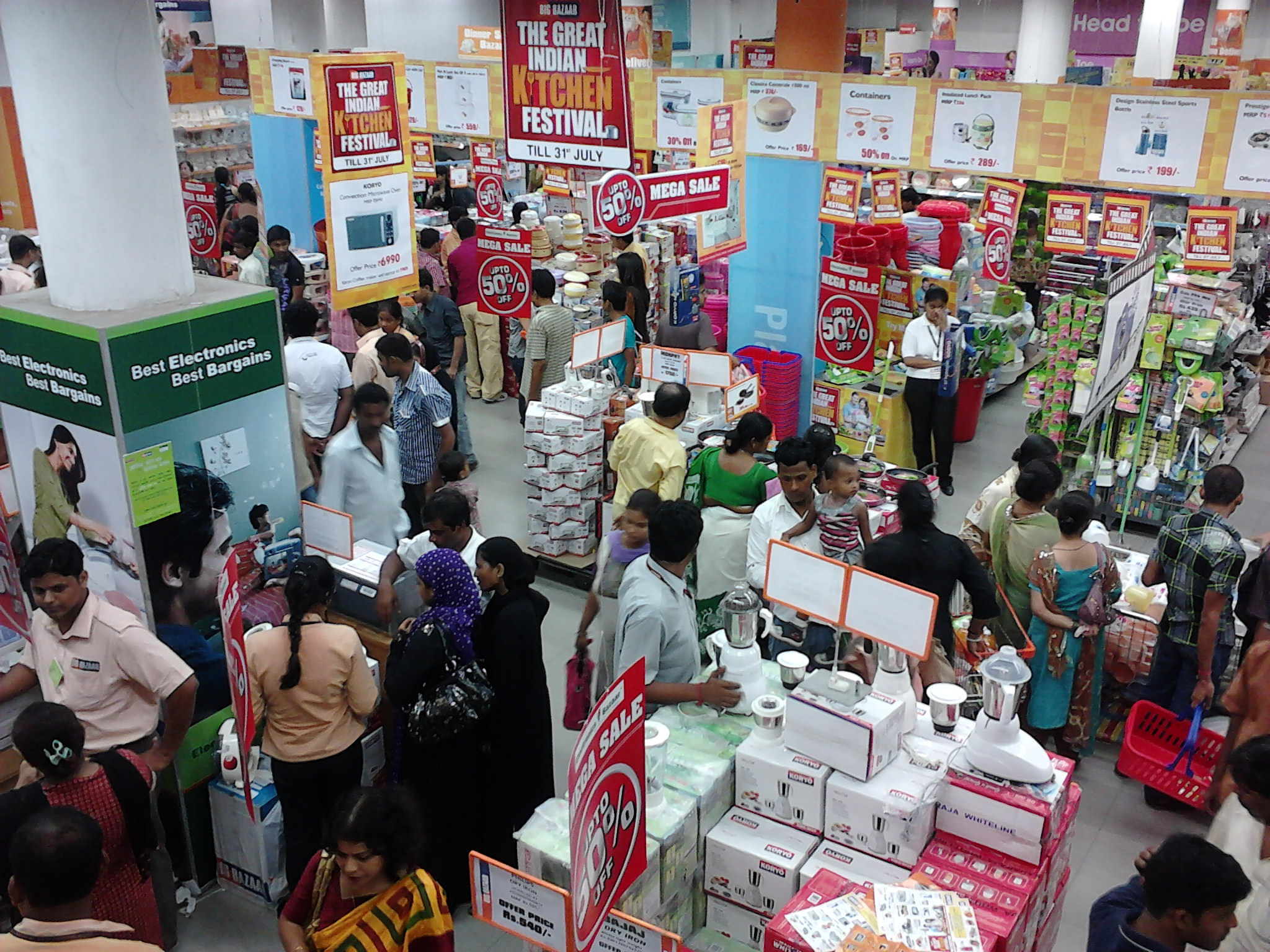
Customers inside a retail store in Kolkata (ca. 2011)

=== Growth over 1997–2010 ===
India in 1997 allowed foreign direct investment (FDI) in cash and carry wholesale. Then, it required government approval. The approval requirement was relaxed, and automatic permission was granted in 2006. Between 2000 and 2010, Indian retail attracted about $1.8 billion in foreign direct investment, representing a very small 1.5% of total investment flow into India.

Single brand retailing attracted 94 proposals between 2006 and 2010, of which 57 were approved and implemented. For a country of 1.2 billion people, this is a very small number. Some claim one of the primary restraint inhibiting better participation was that India required single brand retailers to limit their ownership in Indian outlets to 51%. China in contrast allows 100% ownership by foreign companies in both single brand and multi-brand retail presence.

Indian retail has experienced limited growth, and its spoilage of food harvest is amongst the highest in the world, because of very limited integrated cold chain and other infrastructure. India has only 5386 stand-alone cold storages, having a total capacity of 23.6 million metric tons. However, 80 percent of this storage is used only for potatoes. The remaining infrastructure capacity is less than 1% of the annual farm output of India, and grossly inadequate during peak harvest seasons. This leads to about 30% losses in certain perishable agricultural output in India, on average, every year.

Indian laws already allow foreign direct investment in cold-chain infrastructure to the extent of 100 percent. There has been no interest in foreign direct investment in cold storage infrastructure build out. Experts claim that cold storage infrastructure will become economically viable only when there is strong and contractually binding demand from organised retail. The risk of cold storing perishable food, without an assured way to move and sell it, puts the economic viability of expensive cold storage in doubt. In the absence of organised retail competition and with a ban on foreign direct investment in multi-brand retailers, foreign direct investments are unlikely to begin in cold storage and farm logistics infrastructure.

Until 2010, intermediaries and middlemen in India have dominated the value chain. Due to a number of intermediaries involved in the traditional Indian retail chain, norms are flouted and pricing lacks transparency. Small Indian farmers realise only 1/3rd of the total price paid by the final Indian consumer, as against 2/3rd by farmers in nations with a higher share of organised retail. The 60%+ margins for middlemen and traditional retail shops have limited growth and prevented innovation in Indian retail industry.

India has had years of debate and discussions on the risks and prudence of allowing innovation and competition within its retail industry. Numerous economists repeatedly recommended to the Government of India that legal restrictions on organised retail must be removed, and the retail industry in India must be opened to competition. For example, in an invited address to the Indian parliament in December 2010, Jagdish Bhagwati, Professor of Economics and Law at the Columbia University analysed the relationship between growth and poverty reduction, then urged the Indian parliament to extend economic reforms by freeing up of the retail sector, further liberalisation of trade in all sectors, and introducing labour market reforms. Such reforms Professor Bhagwati argued will accelerate economic growth and make a sustainable difference in the life of India's poorest.,

A 2007 report noted that an increasing number of people in India are turning to the services sector for employment due to the relative low compensation offered by the traditional agriculture and manufacturing sectors. The organised retail market is growing at 35 percent annually while growth of unorganised retail sector is pegged at 6 percent.

The Retail Business in India is currently at the point of inflection. As of 2008, rapid change with investments to the tune of US$25 billion were being planned by several Indian and multinational companies in the next 5 years. It is a huge industry in terms of size and according to India Brand Equity Foundation (IBEF), it is valued at about US$395.96 billion. Organised retail is expected to garner about 16-18 percent of the total retail market (US$65–75 billion) in the next 5 years.

India has topped the A.T. Kearney's annual Global Retail Development Index (GRDI) for the third consecutive year, maintaining its position as the most attractive market for retail investment. The Indian economy has registered a growth of 8% for 2007. The predictions for 2008 is 7.9%. The enormous growth of the retail industry has created a huge demand for real estate. Property developers are creating retail real estate at an aggressive pace and by 2010, 300 malls are estimated to be operational in the country.

=== Growth after 2011 ===
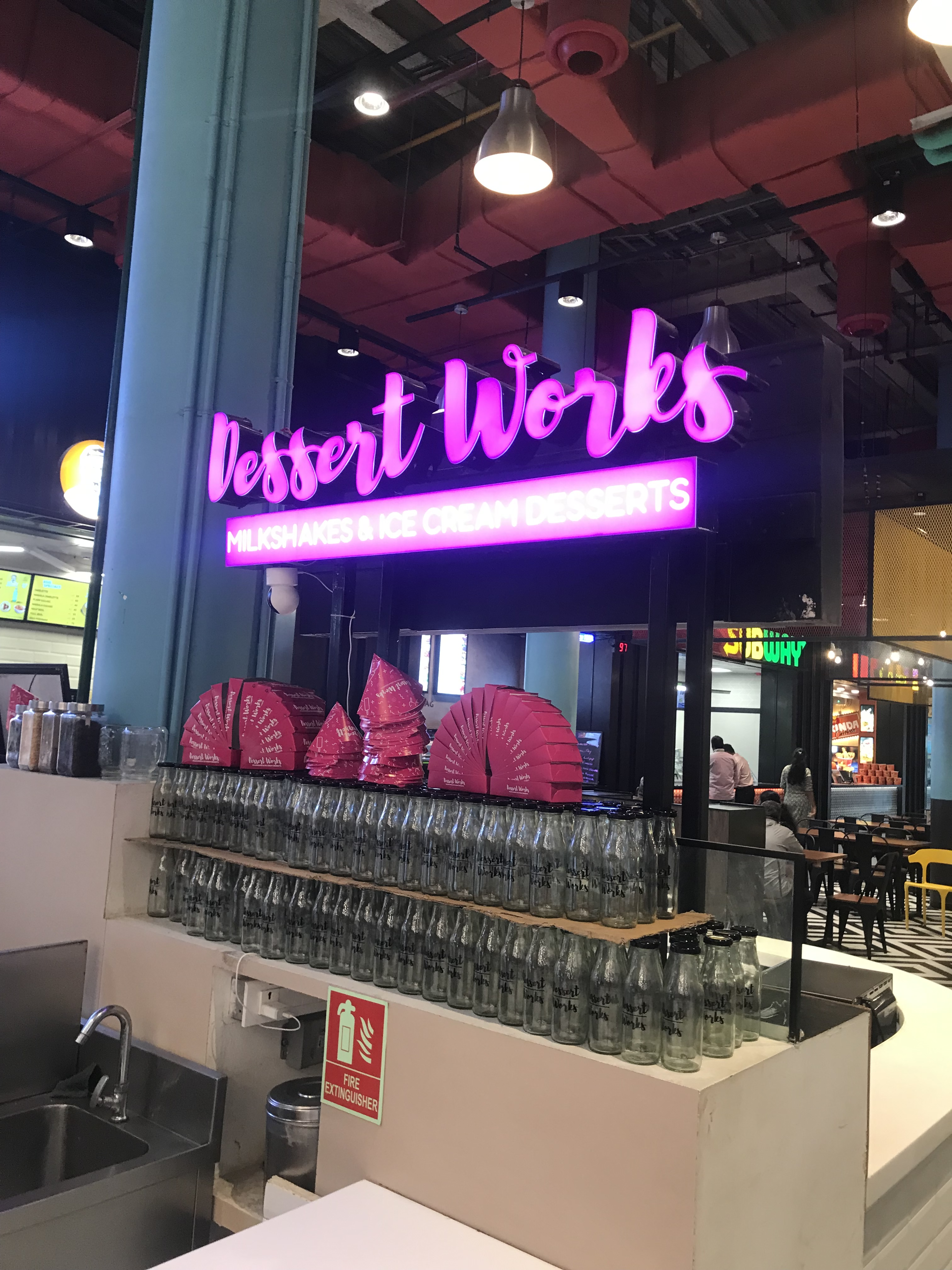
Dessert Works Hebbal bangalore

Before 2011, India had prevented innovation and organised competition in its consumer retail industry. Several studies claim that the lack of infrastructure and competitive retail industry is a key cause of India's persistently high inflation. Furthermore, because of unorganised retail, in a nation where malnutrition remains a serious problem, food wastage is rife. Well over 30% of food staples and perishable goods produced in India spoil because of poor infrastructure and small retail outlets prevent hygienic storage and movement of the goods from the farmer to the consumer.

One report estimates the 2011 Indian retail market as generating sales of about $470 billion a year, of which a minuscule $27 billion comes from organised retail such as supermarkets, chain stores with centralised operations and shops in malls. The opening of retail industry to free market competition, some claim will enable rapid growth in retail sector of Indian economy. Others believe the growth of Indian retail industry will take time, with organised retail possibly needing a decade to grow to a 25% share. A 25% market share, given the expected growth of Indian retail industry through 2021, is estimated to be over $250 billion a year: a revenue equal to the 2009 revenue share from Japan for the world's 250 largest retailers.,

The Economist forecasts that Indian retail will nearly double in economic value, expanding by about $850 billion by 2020. The projected increase alone is equivalent to the current retail market size of France.

In 2011, food accounted for 70% of Indian retail, but was under-represented by organised retail. A.T. Kearney estimates India's organised retail had a 31% share in clothing and apparel, while the home supplies retail was growing between 20% and 30% per year. These data correspond to retail prospects prior to November announcement of the retail reform.

It might be true that India has the largest number of shops per inhabitant. However, detailed figures are available for Belgium, the Netherlands, and Luxembourg. In Belgium, the number of outlets is approximately 8 per 1,000 inhabitants, while in the Netherlands it is 6 per 1,000 inhabitants. Therefore, the Indian figure must be significantly higher.

== Indian retail market ==
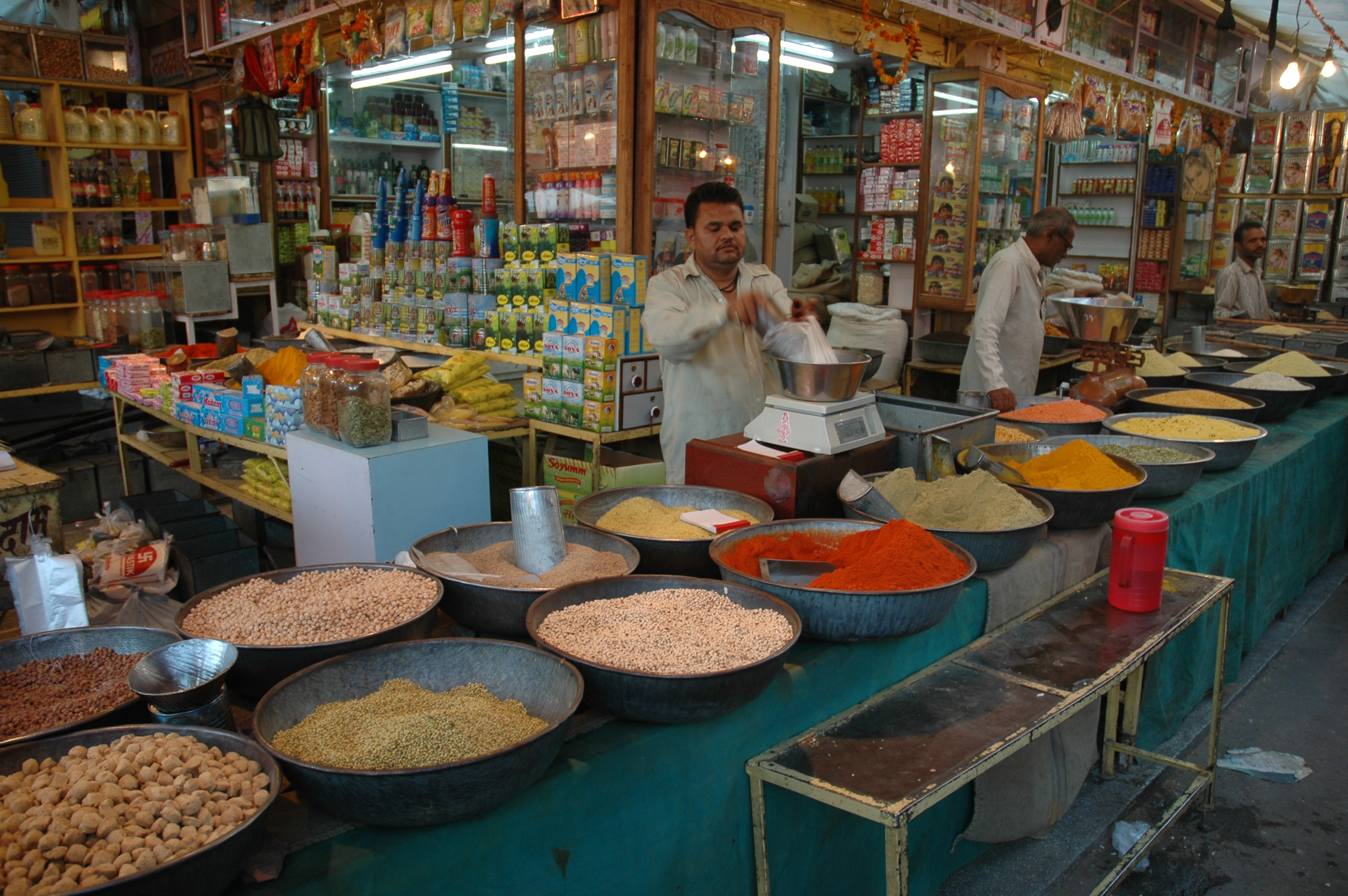
A spice market

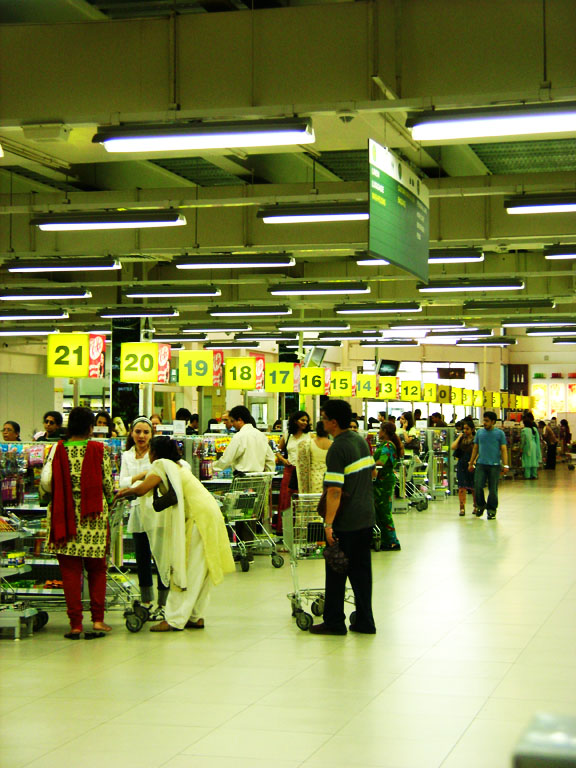
Checkout lanes, organised retail in Malad, Mumbai

Modern retail format

Country	Modern retail (in 2011, % of total)
India	7%
China	20%
Thailand	40%
United States	85%

Indian market has high complexities in terms of a wide geographic spread and distinct consumer preferences varying by each region necessitating a need for localization even within the geographic zones. India has highest number of outlets per person (7 per thousand) Indian retail space per capita at 2 sq ft (0.19 m^{2})/ person is lowest in the world Indian retail density of 6 percent is highest in the world. 1.8 million households in India have an annual income of over ₹4.5 million (US$48,073.50).

The organised retail market has a share of 8% as per 2012. While India presents a large market opportunity given the number and increasing purchasing power of consumers, there are significant challenges as well given that over 90% of trade is conducted through independent local stores. Challenges include: Geographically dispersed population, small ticket sizes, complex distribution network, little use of IT systems, limitations of mass media and existence of counterfeit goods.

A number of merger and acquisitions have begun in Indian retail market. PWC estimates the multi-brand retail market to grow to $220 billion by 2020.

== Challenges ==
A McKinsey study claims retail productivity in India is very low compared to international peer measures. For example, the labour productivity in Indian retail was just 6% of the labour productivity in United States in 2010. India's labour productivity in food retailing is about 5% compared to Brazil's 14%; while India's labour productivity in non-food retailing is about 8% compared to Poland's 25%.

Total retail employment in India, both organised and unorganised, account for about 6% of Indian labour work force currently - most of which is unorganised. This about a third of levels in United States and Europe; and about half of levels in other emerging economies. A complete expansion of retail sector to levels and productivity similar to other emerging economies and developed economies such as the United States would create over 50 million jobs in India. Training and development of labour and management for higher retail productivity is expected to be a challenge.

In November 2011, the Indian government announced relaxation of some rules and the opening of retail market to competition.

== India retail reforms ==
Until 2011, Indian central government denied foreign direct investment (FDI) in multi-brand Indian retail, forbidding foreign groups from any ownership in supermarkets, convenience stores or any retail outlets, to sell multiple products from different brands directly to Indian consumers.

The government of Manmohan Singh, prime minister, announced on 24 November 2011 the following:

- India will allow foreign groups to own up to 51 per cent in "multi-brand retailers", as supermarkets are known in India, in the most radical pro-liberalisation reform passed by an Indian cabinet in years;
- single brand retailers, such as Apple and Ikea, can own 100 percent of their Indian stores, up from the previous cap of 51 percent;
- both multi-brand and single brand stores in India will have to source nearly a third of their goods from small and medium-sized Indian suppliers;
- all multi-brand and single brand stores in India must confine their operations to 53-odd cities with a population over one million, out of some 7935 towns and cities in India. It is expected that these stores will now have full access to over 200 million urban consumers in India;
- multi-brand retailers must have a minimum investment of US$100 million with at least half of the amount invested in back end infrastructure, including cold chains, refrigeration, transportation, packing, sorting and processing to considerably reduce the post harvest losses and bring remunerative prices to farmers;
- the opening of retail competition will be within India's federal structure of government. In other words, the policy is an enabling legal framework for India. The states of India have the prerogative to accept it and implement it, or they can decide to not implement it if they so choose. Actual implementation of policy will be within the parameters of state laws and regulations.

The opening of retail industry to global competition is expected to spur a retail rush to India. It has the potential to transform not only the retailing landscape but also the nation's ailing infrastructure.,

A Wall Street Journal article claims that fresh investments in Indian organised retail will generate 10 million new jobs between 2012 and 2014, and about five to six million of them in logistics alone; even though the retail market is being opened to just 53 cities out of about 8000 towns and cities in India.

=== Indian retail reforms on hold ===
According to Bloomberg, on 3 December 2011, the Chief Minister of the Indian state of West Bengal, Mamata Banerjee, who is against the policy and whose Trinamool Congress brings 19 votes to the ruling Congress party-led coalition, claimed that India's government may put the FDI retail reforms on hold until it reaches consensus within the ruling coalition. Reuters reports that this risked a possible dilution of the policy rather than a change of heart.,

Several newspapers claimed on 6 December 2011 that India parliament is expected to shelve retail reforms while the ruling Congress party seeks consensus from the opposition and the Congress party's own coalition partners. Suspension of retail reforms on 7 December 2011 would be, the reports claimed, an embarrassing defeat for the Indian government, suggesting it is weak and ineffective in implementing its ideas.

Anand Sharma, India's Commerce and Industry Minister, after a meeting of all political parties on 7 December 2011 said, "The decision to allow foreign direct investment in retail is suspended till consensus is reached with all stakeholders."

In February 2014, Vasundhara Raje led newly elected Rajasthan Government reversed the earlier Government's decision of allowing FDI in retail in the state. It reasoned that the sources of domestic retail are primarily local whereas international retail affects domestic manufacturing activity and hence reduces employment opportunities.

=== Single-brand retail reforms approved ===
On 11 January 2012, India approved increased competition and innovation in single-brand retail.

The reform seeks to attract investments in operations and marketing, improve the availability of goods for the consumer, encourage increased sourcing of goods from India, and enhance competitiveness of Indian enterprises through access to global designs, technologies and management practices. In this announcement, India requires single-brand retailer, with greater than 51% foreign ownership, to source at least 30% of the value of products from Indian small industries, village and cottage industries, artisans and craftsmen.

Mikael Ohlsson, chief executive of IKEA, announced IKEA is postponing its plan to open stores in India. He claimed that IKEA's decision reflects India's requirements that single-brand retailers such as IKEA source 30 percent of their goods from local small and medium-sized companies. This was an obstacle to IKEA's investment in India, and that it will take IKEA some time to source goods and develop reliable supply chains inside India. Ikea announced that it plans to double what it sources from India already for its global product range, to over $1 billion a year, within three years. IKEA in the near term, plans to focus expansion instead in China and Russia, where such restrictions do not exist.

On 19 Feb 2013 Tamil Nadu became the first state in the country to stoutly resist MNC 'invasion' into the domestic retail sector. In Chennai, Tamil Nadu CMDA authorities placed a seal on the massive warehouse spreading across 7 acres that had reportedly been built for one of the world's leading multinational retail giants, Wal-mart.

Domestic retail players like Future Retail, Avenues Supermarket and Aditya Birla Fashion and Retail has been slowly growing, making entering the country more difficult for MNCs like Walmart and Carrefour.

On 28 August 2019, Indian union cabinet approved proposals to ease local sourcing norms as applicable to SBRT.

== Social impact and controversy with retail reforms ==
The November 2011 retail reforms in India have sparked intense activism, both in opposition and in support of the reforms.

=== Controversy over allowing Foreign retailers ===
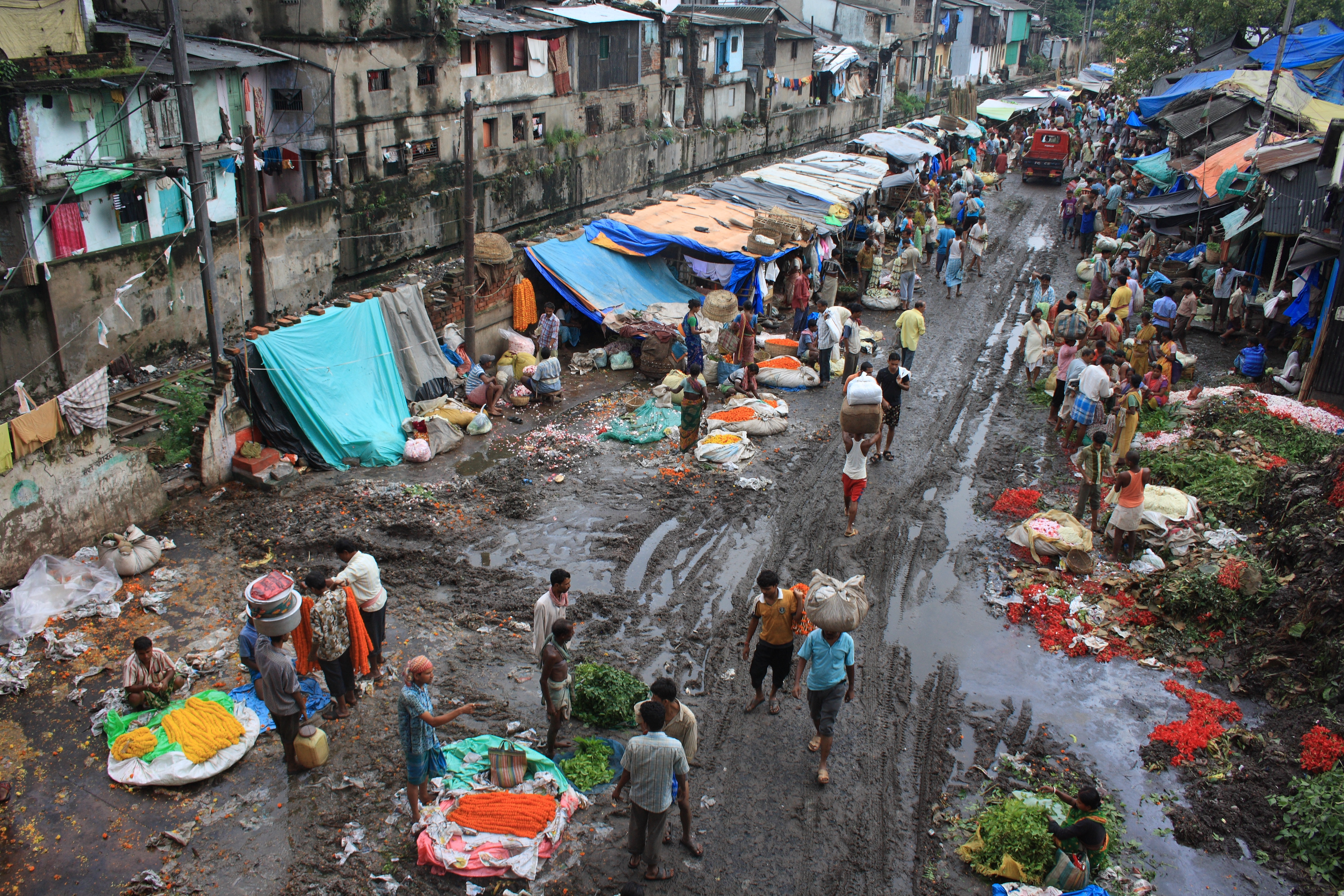
A horticultural produce retail market in Kolkata, India; produce loss in these retail formats is very high for perishables.

Critics of deregulating retail in India are making one or more of the following claims:

- Independent stores will close, leading to massive job losses. Walmart employs very few people in the United States. If allowed to expand in India as much as Walmart has expanded in the United States, few thousand jobs may be created but millions will be lost.
- Walmart's efficiency at supply chain management leads to direct procurement of goods from the supplier. In addition to eliminating the "middle-man", due to its status as the leading retailer, suppliers of goods are pressured to drop prices in order to assure consistent cash flow.
- The small retailer and the middle man present in the retail industry play a large part in supporting the local economy, since they typically procure goods and services from the area they have their retail shops in. This leads to increased economic activity, and wealth redistribution. With large, efficient retailers, goods are acquired in other regions, hence reducing the local economy.
- Walmart may lower prices to dump goods, get competition out of the way, become a monopoly, then raise prices. It is argued this was the case of the soft drinks industry, where Pepsi and Coca-Cola came in and wiped out all the domestic brands.
- India doesn't need foreign retailers, since homegrown companies and traditional markets have been able to do the job.
- Work will be done by Indians, profits will go to foreigners.
- Like the East India Company, Walmart could enter India as a trader and then take over politically.
- There will be sterile homogeneity and Indian cities will look like cities anywhere else.
- The government hasn't built consensus.
- The government claims modern retail will create 4 million new jobs. This cannot be true because Walmart, with over 9000 stores worldwide, has only 2.1 million employees.
- By allowing modern retail there could be more stores in total than Walmart has over the world, it's not unfeasible for 20,000 stores in India which would indeed create more than 4 million jobs. Let's not forget that India has ~3 times the population of the United States.
- The Democratic staff of the U.S. House Committee on Education and the Workforce Report- Wal-Mart's low wages and their effect on taxpayers and economic growth.

Supporters claim none of these objections has merit. They claim:

- Organised retail will need workers. Walmart employs 1.4 million people in United States alone. With United States population of about 300 million, and India's population of about 1200 million, if Walmart-like retail companies were to expand in India as much as their presence in the United States, and the staffing level in Indian stores kept at the same level as in the United States stores, Walmart alone would employ 5.6 million Indian citizens. Walmart has a 6.5% market share of the total United States retail. Adjusted for this market share, the expected jobs in future Indian organised retail would total over 85 million. In addition, millions of additional jobs will be created during the building of and the maintenance of retail stores, roads, cold storage centers, software industry, electronic cash registers and other retail supporting organisations. Instead of job losses, retail reforms are likely to be massive boost to Indian job availability.
- KPMG - one of the world's largest audit companies - finds that in China, the employment in both retail and wholesale trade increased from 4% in 1992 to about 7% in 2001, post China opening its retail to foreign and domestic innovation and competition. In absolute terms, China experienced the creation of 26 million new jobs within 9 years, post China announcing FDI retail reforms. Additionally, contrary to some concerns in China, post retail reforms, the number of traditional small retailers also grew by 30% over 5 years.
- India needs trillions of dollars to build its infrastructure, hospitals, housing and schools for its growing population. The Indian economy is small, with limited surplus capital. The government is already operating on budget deficits. It is simply not possible for Indian investors or the government to fund this expansion, job creation and growth at the rate India needs. Global investment capital through FDI is necessary. Beyond capital, the Indian retail industry needs knowledge and global integration. Global retail leaders, some of which are partly owned by people of Indian origin, can bring this knowledge. Global integration can potentially open export markets for Indian farmers and producers. Walmart, for example, expects to source and export some $1 billion worth of goods from India every year, since it came into Indian wholesale retail market.
- Walmart, Carrefour, Tesco, Target, Metro, Coop are some of over 350 global retail companies with annual sales over $1 billion. These retail companies have operated for over 30 years in numerous countries. They have not become monopolies. Competition between Walmart-like retailers has kept food prices in check. Canada credits their very low inflation rates to Walmart-effect. Anti-trust laws and state regulations, such as those in Indian legal code, have prevented food monopolies from forming anywhere in the world. Price inflation in these countries has been 5 to 10 times lower than price inflation in India. The current consumer price inflation in Europe and the United States is less than 2%, compared to India's double digit inflation.
- The Pepsi and Coca-Cola example is meaningless in the context of Indian beverage market. More competition is lacking because of limited demand. Indian consumer has limited interest in soft drinks. Soft drinks represent less than 5% of Indian beverage market. Indian consumers prefer milk-based, tea and coffee and these account for 90% of Indian beverage market, with plenty of competing domestic brands and even European brands like Nestlé. The next most important market in India is bottled water, which outsells the combined soft drink sales of the Pepsi and Coca-Cola. Organised retail too will have numerous brands and strong competition.
- Comparing the 21st century to the 18th century is inappropriate. Conditions today are different. India wasn't a democracy then. Global awareness and news media have also changed. For example, China has over 57 million square feet of retail space owned by foreigners, employing millions of Chinese citizens. Yet, China hasn't become a vassal of imperialists, enjoying respect from all global powers. Other Asian countries like Malaysia, Taiwan, Thailand and Indonesia see foreign retailers as catalysts of new technology and price reduction; and they have benefited by welcoming FDI in retail. India too will benefit by integrating with the world, rather than isolating itself.
- With 51% FDI limit in multi-brand retailers, nearly half of any profits will remain in India. Any profits will be subject to taxes, and such taxes will reduce Indian government budget deficit. Many years ago, China adopted the retail reform policy India has announced; allowing FDI in its retail sector. FDI-financed retailers in China took between 5 and 10 years to post profits, in large part because of huge investments initially made. Like China, it is unlikely foreign retailers will earn any profits in India for the first 5 to 10 years. Ultimately, retail companies must earn profits by creating value.
- States have a right to say no to retail FDI within their jurisdiction. States have the right to add restrictions to the retail policy announced before they implement them. Thus, they can place limits on number, market share, style, diversity, homogeneity and other factors to suit their cultural preferences. Finally, in future, states can always introduce regulations and India can change the law to ensure the benefits of retail reforms reach the poorest and weakest segments of Indian society, free and fair retail competition does indeed lead to sharply lower inflation than current levels, small farmers get better prices, jobs created by organised retail pay well, and healthier food becomes available to more households.
- Inbuilt inefficiencies and wastage in distribution and storage account for why, according to some estimates, as much as 40% of food production doesn't reach consumers. Fifty million children in India are malnourished. Food often rots in farms, in transit, or in antiquated state-run warehouses. Cost-conscious organised retail companies will avoid waste and loss, making food available to the weakest and poorest segment of Indian society, while increasing the income of small farmers. Walmart, for example, since its arrival in Indian wholesale retail market, has successfully introduced the "Direct Farm Project" at Haider Nagar near Malerkotla in Punjab, where 110 farmers have been connected with Bharti Walmart for sourcing fresh vegetables directly, thereby reducing waste and bringing fresher produce to Indian consumers.
- Indian small shops employ workers without proper contracts, making them work long hours. Many unorganised small shops depend on child labour. A well-regulated retail sector will help curtail some of these abuses.
- Organised retail has enabled a wide range of companies to start and flourish in other countries. For example, in the United States, retailer Whole Foods has rapidly grown to annual revenues of $9 billion by working closely with farmers, delighting customers and caring about the communities it has stores in.
- The claims that there is no consensus is without merit. About 10 years ago, when opposition formed the central government, they had proposed retail reforms and suggested India consider FDI in retail. Retail reforms discussions are not new. More recently, retail reforms announced evolved after a process of intense consultations and consensus building initiative. In 2010, the Indian government circulated a discussion paper on FDI retail reforms. On 6 July 2011, another version of the discussion paper was circulated by the central government of India. Comments from a wide cross-section of Indian society including farmers' associations, industry bodies, consumer forums, academics, traders' associations, investors, economists were analysed in depth before the matter was discussed by the Committee of Secretaries. By early August 2011, the consensus from various segments of Indian society was overwhelming in favour of retail reforms. The reform outline was presented in India's Rajya Sabha in August 2011. The announced reforms are the result of this consensus process. The current opposition is not helping the consensus process, since consensus is not built by threats and disruption. Those who oppose current retail reforms should help build consensus with ideas and proposals. The opposition parties currently disrupting the Indian parliament on retail reforms have not offered even one idea or a single proposal on how India can eliminate food spoilage, reduce inflation, improve food security, feed the poor, improve the incomes of small farmers.
- A study by Global Insights research found that modern retailers such as Walmart create jobs directly, indirectly and by induced effects. In Dallas-Fort Worth area of the United States, with a population of about 2 million people, Global Insights found that Walmart alone had helped create about 6,300 new net jobs with an average salary of over $21,000 each. For India's urban population of over 400 million, an average salary of less than $2,100 per year, this scales to over 12 million new jobs. Other multi-brand retailers, such as Mitsukoshi of Japan, employ a much higher number of sales support employee per store, than Walmart, to suit local consumer culture. The Global Insights study also found that the modern retail such as Walmart were a key contributor in creating new net jobs and maintaining low consumer price inflation rates from 1985 to 2005.

=== Opposition to retail reforms ===
Within a week of retail reform announcement, Indian government has faced a political backlash against its decision to allow competition and 51% ownership of multi-brand organised retail in India.

Despite the fact that Salman Khurshid, India's law minister, claiming that many opposition parties, including the Bharatiya Janata Party, had privately encouraged the government to push through the retail reform, the intense criticism now targets Congress-led coalition government, and its decision to push through one of the biggest economic reforms in years for India. Opposition parties claim supermarket chains are ill-advised, unilateral and unwelcome.

The opposition claims the entry of organised retailers would lead to their dominance that would decimate local retailers and force millions of people out of work.

Mamata Banerjee, the chief minister of West Bengal and the leader of the Trinamool Congress, announced her opposition to retail reform, claiming "Some people might support it, but I do not support it. You see America is America … and India is India. One has to see what one's capacity is".

Other states whose Chief Ministers have either personally announced opposition or announced reluctance to implement the retail reforms: Tamil Nadu, Uttar Pradesh, Bihar and Madhya Pradesh.

Chief Ministers of many states have not made a personal statement in opposition or support of India needing retail reforms. Gujarat, Kerala, Karnataka and Rajasthan are examples of these states. Both sides have made conflicting claims about the position of chief ministers from these states.

A Wall Street Journal article reports that in Uttar Pradesh, Uma Bharti, a senior leader of the opposition Bharatiya Janata Party (BJP), threatened to "set fire to the first Wal-Mart store whenever it opens;" with her colleague Sushma Swaraj busy tweeting up a storm of misinformation about how Wal-Mart allegedly ruined the U.S. economy.

On 1 December 2011, an India-wide "bandh" (close all business in protest) was called by political parties opposing the retail reform. While many organisations responded, the reach of the protest was mixed. The Times of India, a national newspaper of India, claimed people appeared divided over the bandh call and internal rivalry among trade associations led to a mixed response, leaving many stores open day-long and others opening for business as usual in the second half of the day. Even Purti Group, a network of stores owned and operated by Nitin Gadkari were open for business, ignoring the call for bandh. Gadkari is the president of BJP, the key party currently organising opposition to retail reform.

The Hindu, another widely circulated newspaper in India, claimed the opposition's call for a nationwide shutdown on 1 December 2011, in protest of retail reform received a mixed response. Some states had strong support, while most did not. Even in states where opposition political parties are in power, many ignored the call for the shutdown. In Gujarat, Bihar, Delhi, Andhra Pradesh, Haryana, Punjab and Assam the call evoked a partial response. While a number of wholesale markets observed the shutdown, the newspaper claimed a majority of kirana stores and neighborhood small shops – for whom apparently the trade bandh had been called – remained open, ignoring the shutdown call. Conflicting claims were made by the organisers of the nationwide shutdown. Contrary to eyewitness reports, one Trader union's secretary general claimed traders across the country participated wholeheartedly in the strike.

The political parties opposing the retail reforms physically disrupted and forced India's parliament to adjourn again on Friday 2 December 2011. The Indian government refused to cave in, in its attempt to convince through dialogue that retail reforms are necessary to protect the farmers and consumers. Indian parliament has been dysfunctional for the entire week of 28 November 2011 over the opposition to retail reforms.

=== Support for retail reforms ===
In a pan-Indian survey conducted over the weekend of 3 December 2011, overwhelming majority of consumers and farmers in and around ten major cities across the country support the retail reforms. Over 90 per cent of consumers said FDI in retail will bring down prices and offer a wider choice of goods. Nearly 78 per cent of farmers said they will get better prices for their produce from multi-format stores. Over 75 per cent of the traders claimed their marketing resources will continue to be needed to push sales through multiple channels, but they may have to accept lower margins for greater volumes.

A study in India on title 'Foreign Direct Investment In Indian Retail Sector: Drawing lessons from the international experience', concluded that the entry of FDI in multi brand retail in India can be growth enhancing only if proper safeguards are in place and the market environment is regulated. Firstly, the resources should be dedicated for a comprehensive study of retail and its related industries. Secondly, the number of big retail outlets in a particular city should be decided on the basis of population criterion and the employment level of local youth in the retail business. Thirdly, the format of these retail chains should also be regulated as is done in Malaysian case. They should not be in the form of neighborhood convenience store and there should be minimum and maximum limit of the size of these stores. Fourthly, it is important to ensure that no single retailer monopolizes the procurement operations in an area, district or state in order to protect the local suppliers. Lastly, the predatory pricing and the anti competitive practices of these international retailers should be prohibited in order to create a playing field for local retailers SOURCE.

==== Farmer groups ====
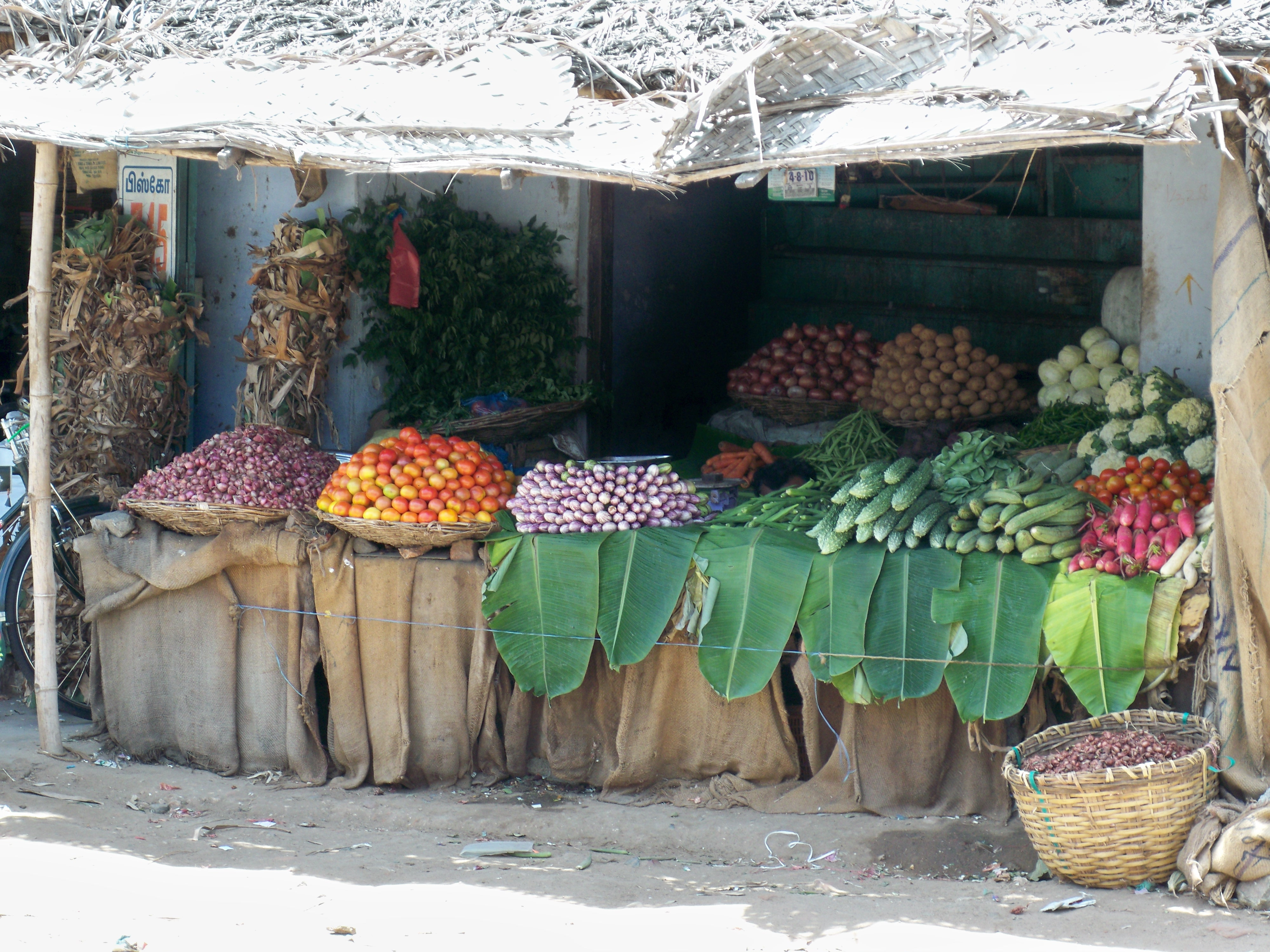
A vegetable shop in rural India

Various farmer associations in India have announced their support for the retail reforms. For example:

- Shriram Gadhve of All India Vegetable Growers Association (AIVGA) claims his organisation supports retail reform. He claimed that currently, it is the middlemen commission agents who benefit at the cost of farmers. He urged that the retail reform must focus on rural areas and that farmers receive benefits. Gadhve claimed, "A better cold storage would help since this could help prevent the existing loss of 34% of fruits and vegetables due to inefficient systems in place." AIVGA operates in nine states including Maharashtra, Andhra Pradesh, West Bengal, Bihar, Chhattisgarh, Punjab and Haryana with 2,200 farmer outfits as its members.
- Bharat Krishak Samaj, a farmer association with more than 75,000 members says it supports retail reform. Ajay Vir Jakhar, the chairman of Bharat Krishak Samaj, claimed a monopoly exists between the private guilds of middlemen, commission agents at the sabzi mandis (India's wholesale markets for vegetables and farm produce) and the small shopkeepers in the unorganised retail market. Given the perishable nature of food like fruit and vegetables, without the option of safe and reliable cold storage, the farmer is compelled to sell his crop at whatever price he can get. He cannot wait for a better price and is thus exploited by the current monopoly of middlemen. Jakhar asked that the government make it mandatory for organised retailers to buy 75% of their produce directly from farmers, bypassing the middlemen monopoly and India's sabzi mandi auction system.
- Consortium of Indian Farmers Associations (CIFA) announced its support for retail reform. Chengal Reddy, secretary general of CIFA claimed retail reform could do lots for Indian farmers. Reddy commented, "India has 600 million farmers, 1,200 million consumers and 5 million traders. I fail to understand why political parties are taking an anti-farmer stand and worried about half a million brokers and small shopkeepers". CIFA mainly operates in Andhra Pradesh, Karnataka and Tamil Nadu; but has a growing members from rest of India, including Shetkari Sanghatana in Maharashtra, Rajasthan Kisan Union and Himachal Farmer Organisations.
- Prakash Thakur, the chairman of the People for Environment Horticulture & Livelihood of Himachal Pradesh, announcing his support for retail reforms claimed FDI is expected to roll out produce storage centers that will increase market access, reduce the number of middlemen and enhance returns to farmers. Highly perishable fruits like cherry, apricot, peaches and plums have a huge demand but are unable to tap the market fully because of lack of cold storage and transport infrastructure. Sales will boost with the opening up of retail. Even though India is the second-largest producer of fruits and vegetables in the world, its storage infrastructure is grossly inadequate, claimed Thakur.
- Sharad Joshi, founder of Shetkari Sangathana (farmers association), has announced his support for retail reforms. Joshi claims FDI will help the farm sector improve critical infrastructure and integrate farmer-consumer relationship. Today, the existing retail has not been able to supply fresh vegetables to the consumers because they have not invested in the backward integration. When the farmers' produce reaches the end consumer directly, the farmers will naturally be benefited. Joshi feels retail reform is just a first step of needed agricultural reforms in India, and that the government should pursue additional reforms.

Suryamurthy, in an article in The Telegraph, claims farmer groups across India do not support status quo and seek retail reforms, because with the current retail system the farmer is being exploited. For example, the article claims:

- Indian farmers get only one third of the price consumers pay for food staples, the rest is taken as commissions and markups by middlemen and shopkeepers
- For perishable horticulture produce, average price farmers receive is barely 12 to 15% of the final price consumer pays
- Indian potato farmers sell their crop for Rs. 2 to 3 a kilogram, while the Indian consumer buys the same potato for Rs. 12 to 20 a kilogram.

==== Economists and entrepreneurs ====
Many business groups in India are welcoming the transformation of a long-protected sector that has left Indian shoppers bereft of the scale and variety of their counterparts in more developed markets.

B. Muthuraman, the president of the Confederation of Indian Industry, claimed the retail reform would open enormous opportunities and lead to much-needed investment in cold chain, warehousing and contract farming.

Organised retailers will reduce waste by improving logistics, creating cold storage to prevent food spoilage, improve hygiene and product safety, reduce counterfeit trade and tax evasion on expensive item purchases, and create dependable supply chains for secure supply of food staples, fruits and vegetables. They will increase choice and reduce India's rampant inflation by reducing waste, spoilage and cutting out middlemen. Fresh investment in organised retail, the supporters of retail reform claim will generate 10 million new jobs by 2014, about five to six million of them in logistics alone.To address these infrastructure gaps, some Indian retailers have adopted vertical SaaS platforms for inventory optimization; for example, platforms like Increff provide automated merchandising and supply chain solutions aimed at reducing stockouts.

Organised retail will offer the small Indian farmer more competing venues to sell his or her products, and increase income from less spoilage and waste. A Food and Agricultural Organisation report claims that currently, in India, the small farmer faces significant losses post-harvest at the farm and because of poor roads, inadequate storage technologies, inefficient supply chains and farmer's inability to bring the produce into retail markets dominated by small shopkeepers. These experts claim India's post-harvest losses to exceed 25%, on average, every year for each farmer.,

Unlike the current monopoly of middlemen buyer, retail reforms offer farmers access to more buyers from organised retail. More buyers will compete for farmers produce leading to better support for farmers and to better bids. With less spoilage of staples and agricultural produce, global retail companies can find and provide additional markets to Indian farmers. Walmart, since its arrival in India's wholesale retail market, already sources and exports about $1 billion worth of Indian goods for its global customers.

Not only do these losses reduce food security in India, the study claims that poor farmers and others lose income because of the waste and inefficient retail. Over US$50 billion of additional income can become available to Indian farmers by preventing post-harvest farm losses, improving transport, proper storage and retail. Organised retail is also expected to initiate infrastructure development creating millions of rural and urban jobs for India's growing population. One study claims that if these post-harvest food staple losses could be eliminated with better infrastructure and retail network in India, enough food would be saved every year to feed 70 to 100 million people over the year.

Supporters of retail reform, The Economist claims, say it will increase competition and quality while reducing prices helping to reduce India's rampant inflation that is close to the double digits. These supporters claim that unorganised small shopkeepers will continue to exist alongside large organised supermarkets, because for many Indians they will remain the most accessible and most convenient place to shop.

The Indian retail sector is predominantly served by 12 million traditional stores often called Kirana stores. They can be further classified into mom & pop stores, convenience stores, speciality stores, small super market etc. These traditionally managed stores are largely unorganised and fragmented in nature unable to be tracked efficiently. The technology adoption is largely limited. This is making them vulnerable to changing tech savvy consumer preferences. Demonetisation has forced for good to embrace digital payment technology by them. New age payment companies like Gpay, phonepe, Bhim UPI have leveraged technology for the ease of small payments. Introduction of Goods & service tax GST in the year 01/07/2017 is pressing the need for technology enablement for these small businesses. The converge of affordable technology from POS industry, cloud infrastructure, mobile platforms and low cost bandwidth is largely fuelling the adoption of technology by small retailers. Entrepreneurs are building highly affordable technology products which are likely to bridge the digital divide between online and offline retail.

Amartya Sen, the Indian-born Nobel Prize–winning economist, in a December 2011 interview claims foreign direct investment in multi brand retail can be good thing or bad thing, depending on the nature of the investment. Quite often, claims Professor Sen, FDI is a good thing for India.

==== Allowed in some states, banned in others ====
The governments of some states, particularly Congress-ruled states, have said they will allow foreign supermarkets to open in their state. Andhra Pradesh, Assam, Delhi, Haryana, Kashmir, Maharashtra, Manipur, Uttarakhand, Daman & Diu and Dadra and Nagar Haveli, will allow foreign retailers.

Other states have said they will not allow foreign supermarkets to open in their state. These include West Bengal, Gujarat, Bihar, Kerala, Madhya Pradesh, Tripura, and Orissa, and Rajasthan.

Supporters of retail reform who have voiced the need to promote organised retail include Chief Ministers of several states of India, several belonging to political parties that have no affiliation with Congress-led central government of India. The list includes the Chief Ministers of Maharashtra, Andhra Pradesh, Tamil Nadu and Gujarat. In a report submitted earlier in 2011, these Chief Ministers urged the Prime Minister to prioritize reforms to help promote organised retail, shorten the retail path from farm to consumer, allow organised retail to buy direct from farmers at remunerative produce prices, and reduce farm to retail costs. Similarly, the Chief Minister of Delhi has come out in support of the retail reform, as have the Chief Ministers of the two farming states of Haryana and Punjab in north India., The Chief Ministers of Haryana and Punjab claim that the announced retail reforms will never benefit farmers in their states.

The Chief Minister of the state of Maharashtra - the state with the biggest GDP in India and home to its financial capital Mumbai - has also welcomed the retail reform.,

Tarun Gogoi, the Chief Minister of Assam, an eastern state in India, announcing his support to the retail reform, claimed "this will go a long way in bringing about a change in rural economy. The decision will boost agriculture and allied sectors, manufacturing, logistics, integrated cold chains, refrigerated transportation and food processing facilities in a big way." Criticising the BJP-organised opposition, Gogoi claimed that these parties who had just a few years ago dubbed opening up retail as good for India, are now singing a different tune.

===== 2013 state Elections =====
In December 2013, elections were held in the state of Delhi and a new party came to power. The new chief minister of Delhi opposed foreign investment in retail and has written to the federal government to withdraw permission given by the previous chief minister to allow foreign retailers to open shops in the state. The federal Industry Ministry has responded by saying it does not want foreign investors to think of India as an "unpredictable banana republic" therefore the rules are such that once a state government allows foreign retailers in that state, they cannot dis-allow the foreign shops if a new party comes to power in that state.

==== Current supermarkets ====
Existing Indian retail firms such as Spencer's, Foodworld Supermarkets Ltd, Nilgiri's and ShopRite support retail reform and consider international competition as a blessing in disguise. They expect a flurry of joint ventures with global majors for expansion capital and opportunity to gain expertise in supply chain management. Spencer's Retail with 200 stores in India, and with retail of fresh vegetables and fruits accounting for 55 percent of its business claims retail reform to be a win-win situation, as they already procure the farm products directly from the growers the involvement of middlemen or traders. Spencer's claims that there is scope for it to expand its footprint in terms of store location as well as procuring farm products. Foodworld, which operates over 60 stores, plans to ramp up its presence to more than 200 locations. It has already tied up with Hong Kong-based Dairy Farm International. With the relaxation in international investments in Indian retail, India's Foodworld expects its global relationship will only get stronger. Competition and investment in retail will provide more benefits to consumers through lower prices, wider availability and significant improvement in supply chain logistics.

== See also ==
- Roads in India
- Agriculture in India
- Expressways of India
- Fishing in India
