= Child and Adolescent Labour (Prohibition and Regulation) Act, 1986 =

1986 Indian law

Parliament of India
- Enacted by: Parliament of India
- Status: In force

The Child and Adolescent Labour (Prohibition and Regulation) Act, 1986 is a Law enacted on 23 December 1986 by the Parliament of India and Ministry of Labour and Employment. The Act prohibits private, government or semi-government companies, organizations, civil departments or child's family from employing a Child or Adolescent in any occupation or process, intended to aid his family or guardian. Any occupier or employer caught doing such thing in which a child is being used as a Laborer, is regarded a serious offensive crime.

== Amendments ==
Child Labour (Prohibition and Regulation) Amendment Bill 2016 was passed by Rajya Sabha on 20 July 2016. as per the Child labour act a child is defined as any person below the age of 14, prohibits employment of a child in any employment including as domestic help (exception to family owned business and child actor).
