= Community nursing =

Nursing care delivered outside hospitals

Community nursing is nursing care delivered outside acute hospitals, for example in the home, within General Practice facilities, in community hospitals, in police custody, at a school or in a care home. In the UK, a community nurse needs a degree approved by the Nursing and Midwifery Council, as well as 1–2 years' experience as a qualified Adult Nurse.

The job functions covered include:

- Ambulatory care nursing
- Assisted living
- Faith community nursing
- Flight nurse
- Gerontological nursing
- Home care
- Home health nursing
- Hospital-at-home
- Care Home Nurse
- Community Children's Nurse
- Community Mental Health Nurse (CMHN)
- Community Learning Disability Nurse
- Community Midwife
- Correctional Nursing
- District Nurse (DN)
- General Practice Nurse (GPN)
- Health Visitor (HV)
- Homeless Outreach Nurse
- Nurses working in unscheduled care, e.g. working with paramedics
- Occupational Health Nurse
- Palliative Care Nurse
- Public Health Nurse
- Military nurse
- Nurse-Family Partnership
- Private duty nursing
- School nursing
- Telenursing
