= List of nursing specialties =

This is a list of different nursing specialities. In recent decades, the number of non-bedside nursing roles has increased. Professional organizations or certifying boards issue voluntary certification in many of these specialties.

- Advanced practice nursing
- Aesthetic nursing/cosmetic nursing
- Ambulatory care nursing
- Burn nursing
- Camp nursing
- Cardiac nursing
- Cardiac Intervention nursing
- Diabetes Nursing
- Dental nursing
- Medical case management
- Community health nursing
- Correctional nursing
- Critical care nursing
- Emergency nursing
- Environmental health nursing
- Faith community nursing
- Flight nursing
- Forensic nursing
- Gastroenterology nursing
- Genetics nursing
- Geriatric nursing
- Haematology nursing
- Health visiting
- Holistic nursing
- Home health nursing
- Hospice and palliative care nursing
- Hyperbaric nursing
- Immunology and allergy nursing
- Intravenous therapy nursing
- Infection control nursing
- Infectious disease nursing
- Legal nurse consultant
- Maternal-child nursing
- Medical-surgical nursing
- Military and uniformed services nursing
- Neonatal nursing
- Neurosurgical nursing
- Nephrology nursing
- Nurse attorney
- Nurse+Engineer
- Nursing informatics
- Nursing management
- Nursing research
- Nurse midwifery
- Obstetrical nursing
- Occupational health nursing
- Oncology nursing
- Orthopaedic nursing
- Ostomy nursing
- Pediatric nursing
- Perianesthesia nursing
- Perioperative nursing
- Psychiatric nursing
- Private duty nursing
- Public health nursing
- Pulmonary nursing
- Quality improvement
- Radiology nursing
- Rehabilitation nursing
- Research nursing
- Renal nursing
- School nursing
- Space nursing
- Sub-acute nursing
- Substance abuse nursing
- Surgical nursing
- Telenursing
- Telephone triage nursing
- Transplantation nursing
- Travel nursing
- Urology nursing
- Utilization management
- Vascular Access
- Wound care

== See also ==
- List of nursing credentials
- List of open-source health software
- The Nurse Company
- Florence Nightingale (1820-1910), Notes on Nursing: What It Is, and What It Is Not, London: Harrison, 59, Pall Mall
