= Ambulatist =

Health Care Provider

An ambulatist is a licensed health care provider who specializes in the prevention, management, and care coordination of ambulatory patients with chronic diseases by using lifestyle medicine and drug therapy.

== History ==
Nearly half of all Americans live with at least one chronic condition and ~70% of all American deaths can be attributed directly to chronic diseases. Care coordination is necessary to curb the progression and cost associated with chronic disease in The United States. The ambulatist model of care coordination began in 2008 at Creighton University in Omaha, Nebraska. The Cardiovascular Risk Reduction Prog ram (CVRRP) and Diabetes Risk Reduction Program (DMRRP) are employee wellness benefit programs for Creighton employees with the diagnoses of hypertension, dyslipidemia and/or diabetes. The programs are run by a health care specialty position called the "ambulatist". An ambulatist can be any licensed health care provider who receives training in direct patient care and lifestyle medicine. The areas of lifestyle medicine emphasized can include physical activity, nutrition, weight control, stress management, sleep success and tobacco cessation. Creighton University is now developing an ambulatist training program to expand the use of ambulatist services across a variety of practice settings.

== Goals and responsibilities ==
The goals of an ambulatist include:

- Advocacy for improved patient outcomes.
- Integrating services and resources.
- Avoiding duplicated, contraindicated or incompatible treatments and unnecessary costs.
- Improving patient and caregiver education.
- Enhancing the overall care of the patient.

The responsibilities of an ambulatist include:

- Designing and implementing individualized lifestyle medicine programs consisting of physical activity, nutrition, weight control, stress management, sleep success, alcohol moderation, tobacco cessation and others.
- Designing and implementing individualized health behavior change strategies.
- Acting as an advocate for the needs of the patient and as a liaison for the patient's health care providers.
- Facilitating inter-professional health care on behalf of the individual patient including effective communication and coordination of treatment and prevention strategies.
- Monitoring outcomes and resource use.
- Ensuring patient adherence to individualized lifestyle programs, drug therapy, and other prescribed interventions.
- Communicating with the family members of the patient to inform and educate.

== See also ==
- Ambulatory care
- Primary care
- Reason for encounter
- Health care provider
- Ambulatory care nursing
- Ambulatory as a medical term
- National Association for Ambulatory Urgent Care
