= Ostomy Wound Management =

- Discipline: Wound, ostomy, and continence nursing
- Language: English
- Edited by: Lia van Rijswijk (Clinical Editor), Barbara Zeiger (Managing Editor)

Publication details
- Former name(s): Ostomy Management
- History: 1980–present
- Publisher: HMP Communications, LLC
- Frequency: Monthly
- Impact factor: 1.229 (2013)

Standard abbreviations
- ISO 4: Ostomy Wound Manag.

Indexing
- ISSN: 0889-5899 (print); 1943-2720 (web)
- OCLC no.: 179726188

Links
- Journal homepage; Online access; Online archive

Ostomy Wound Management is a monthly, peer-reviewed medical journal covering all aspects of wound care, ostomy, incontinence, and skin-related care, as well as nutritional issues. The journal covers research regarding wounds, ostomy, incontinence, and nutrition. It is published by HMP Global (formerly HMP Communications, LLC) and was established in March 1980 as Ostomy Management, obtaining its current title in 1985. It is an official journal of the Association for the Advancement of Wound Care. Sponsored columns are provided by manufacturers to showcase the appropriate and successful use of their products.

== Abstracting and indexing ==
The journal is abstracted and indexed in MEDLINE/PubMed, Embase, Science Citation Index Expanded, Current Contents/Clinical Medicine, and CINAHL. According to the Journal Citation Reports, the journal has a 2013 impact factor of 1.229.
