= Eterno =

Eterno may refer to:

- Eterno (wrestler), Mexican professional wrestler.
- Eterno (Luis Fonsi album), 2000
- Eterno (Prince Royce album), 2025
- Eterno (Romanthica album), 2012
- Eterno, German healthcare company
