= Eterno Health =

German healthcare company

Eterno Health GmbH
- Type: private
- Founded: 2019
- Founder: Maximilian Waldmann; Frederic Haitz
- Headquarters: Berlin, Germany
- Key people: Maximilian Waldmann; Frederic Haitz; Bettina Goerner; Felix Burkart; Timo Rodi
- Number of employees: 120 (2026)
- Website: eterno.group

Eterno is a German healthcare technology company headquartered in Berlin, Germany. Founded in 2019, the company develops software for medical practices and operates shared medical practice facilities.

== History ==
Eterno was founded in 2019 by Maximilian Waldmann and Frederic Haitz. The founders initially planned to develop software for medical practices but later combined this with a model of shared clinical facilities where the software could be implemented and tested.

The company was established in response to structural challenges in German outpatient care, including administrative workload for physicians, rising operating costs and difficulties in transferring or establishing private practices.

Operation began in 2022 with the first location in Hamburg. Within a few months, the location expanded from three to 15 physicians. A second location was established in Frankfurt am Main in April 2023. In March 2025, Eterno opened its third co-working facility in Berlin, which is designed to accommodate around 25 to 30 medical practices.

== Company structure ==
The managing directors of Eterno Health GmbH, based in Berlin, are Maximilian Waldmann and Frederic Haitz. Eterno operates medical co-working facilities in Hamburg, Frankfurt, and Berlin. As of 2026, Eterno employs around 120 staff members, including medical assistants working in its facilities.

=== Investors ===
Eterno has raised external capital from investors including insurance companies, family offices and private individuals such as Swiss insurance groups like Helvetia and Helsana, as well as private investors including footballer Mario Götze. As of 2024, the company had raised approximately €40 million in funding.

== Business model ==
=== Software ===
Eterno develops software and AI-systems for medical practices that is used in the company's own facilities as well as in other practices in Germany.

Some of the company's digital tools use artificial intelligence to support administrative tasks. This includes automated appointment scheduling, analysis of appointment attendance patterns and speech recognition systems that document medical consultations and transfer structured summaries into electronic patient records. Additional functions are automated telephone triage, digital patient questionnaires and online systems for prescriptions.

The software uses cloud-based systems hosted in Germany.

=== Practice facilities ===
Eterno operates shared medical practice facilities called Eterno spaces, in which physicians and other healthcare professionals rent consultation rooms and clinical infrastructure. The company provides proprietary software for automating clinical and administrative processes, premises, medical equipment, administrative support, reception staff, cleaning services and IT systems.

Under this model, physicians remain independent practitioners. The arrangement is meant to reduce administrative tasks and financial risks associated with a private medical practice and to allow for more flexible working arrangements.

Physicians working in these facilities include practitioners in general medicine, cardiology, internal medicine, paediatrics, orthopaedics and aesthetic medicine, as well as physiotherapy services. Both privately insured and statutory health insurance patients are treated.
