= WOCN =

WOCN can refer to:

- Wound, Ostomy and Continence Nursing
- WOCN-FM, a radio station (104.7 FM) licensed to serve Orleans, Massachusetts, United States
- WKAT (AM), a radio station (1450 AM) licensed to serve Miami, Florida, United States, which held the call sign WOCN from 1966 to 2019
