= Ambulatory care =

Medical care provided for outpatients

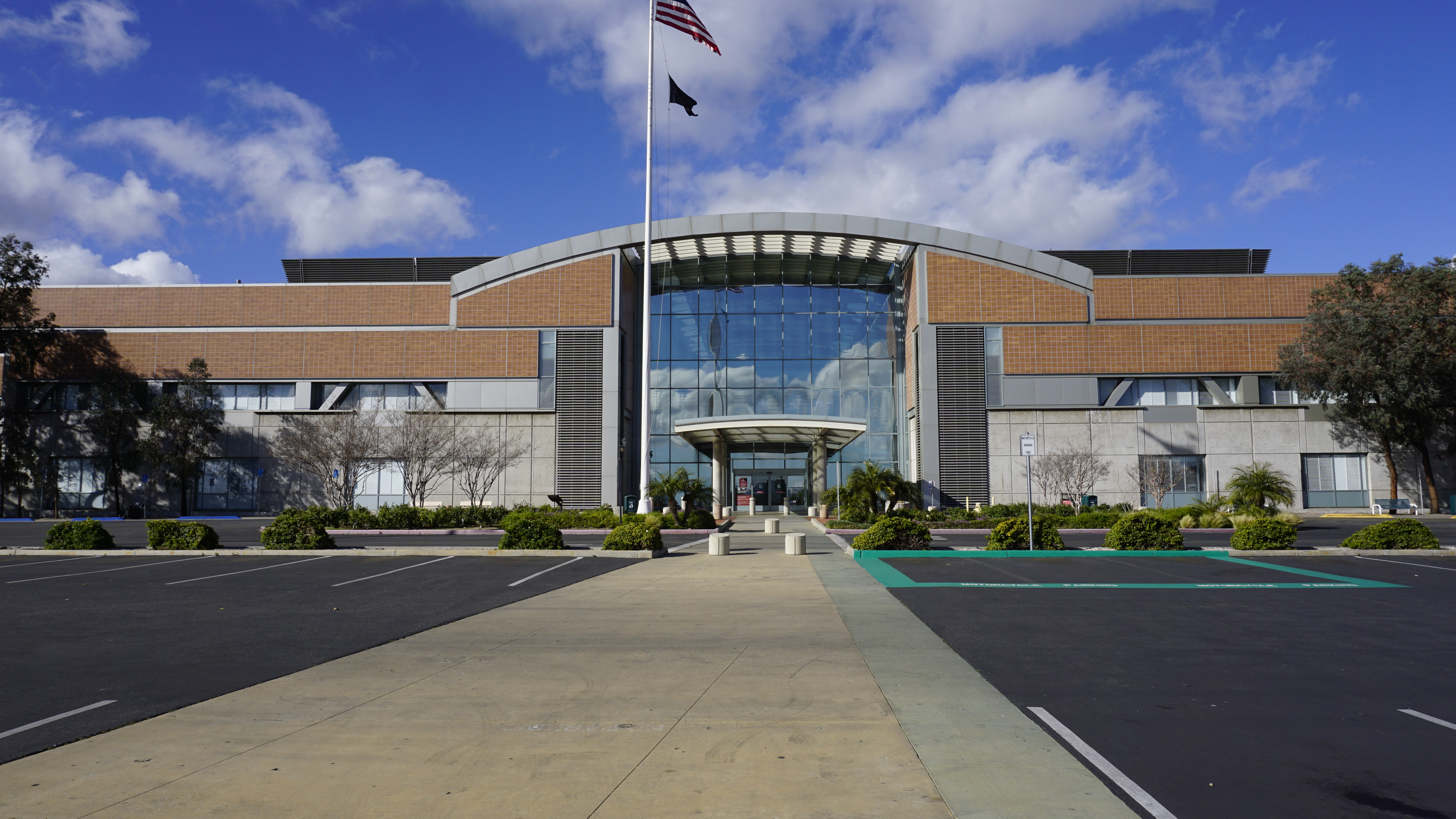
The VA Sepulveda Ambulatory Care Centre in California is a large ambulatory care center where ambulatory care sensitive conditions (ACSC) are routinely assessed and managed.

Ambulatory care or outpatient care is medical care provided on an outpatient basis, including diagnosis, observation, consultation, treatment, intervention, and rehabilitation services. This care can include advanced medical technology and procedures even when provided outside of hospitals.

Ambulatory care sensitive conditions (ACSC) are health conditions where appropriate ambulatory care prevents or reduces the need for hospital admission (or inpatient care), such as diabetes or chronic obstructive pulmonary disease.

Many medical investigations and treatments for acute and chronic illnesses and preventive health care can be performed on an ambulatory basis, including minor surgical and medical procedures, most types of dental services, dermatology services, and many types of diagnostic procedures (e.g. blood tests, X-rays, endoscopy and biopsy procedures of superficial organs). Other types of ambulatory care services include emergency visits, rehabilitation visits, and in some cases telephone consultations.

Ambulatory care services represent the most significant contributor to increasing hospital expenditures and to the performance of the health care system in most countries, including most developing countries.

== Scope ==
Health care organizations use different ways to define the nature of care provided as "ambulatory" versus inpatient or other types of care.

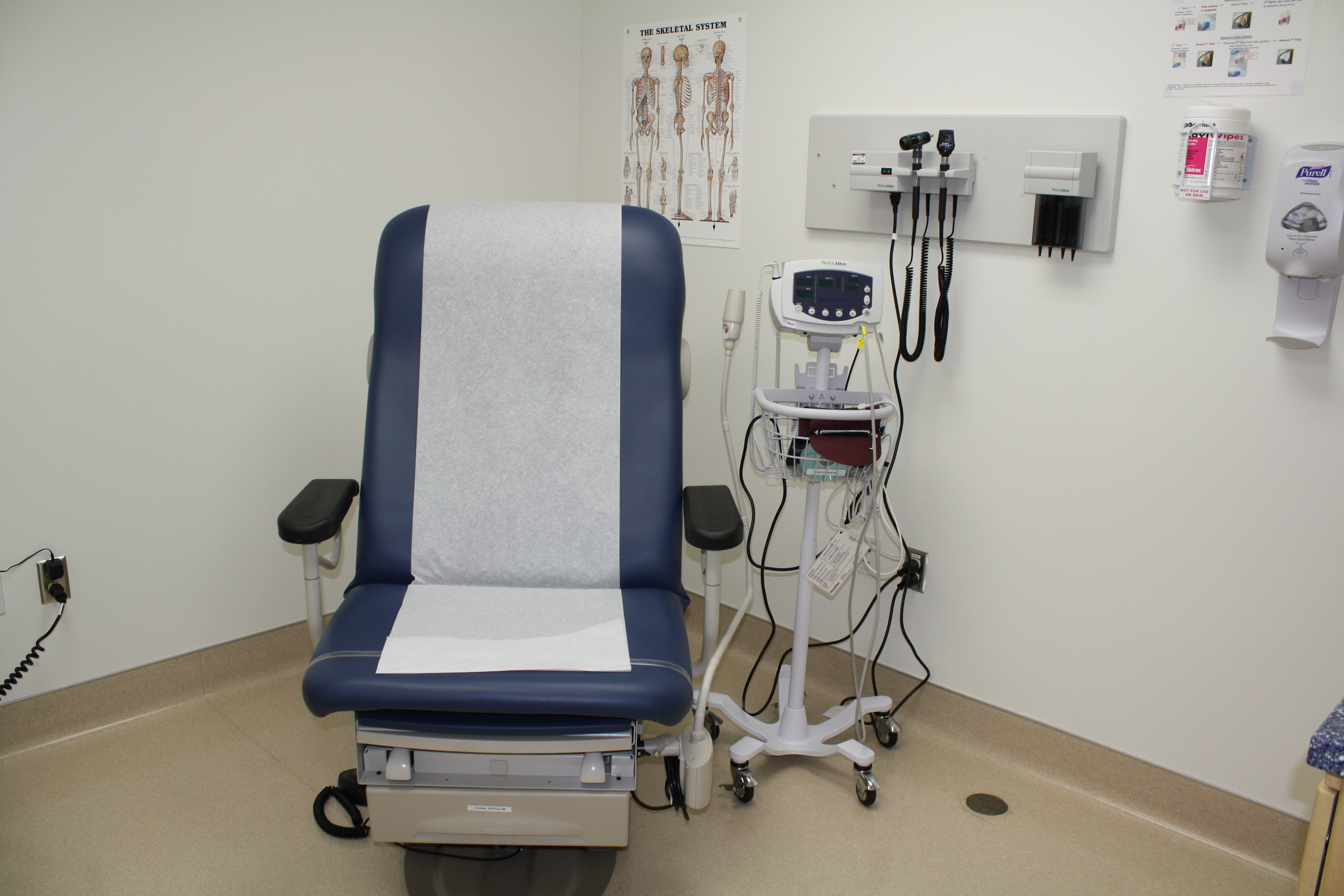
A typical assessment and treatment space for patients in an ambulatory care clinic.

Sites where ambulatory care can be delivered include:

- Doctor's surgeries/Doctor's offices/General medical practice: This is the most common site for the delivery of ambulatory care in many countries, and usually consists of a physician's visit. Physicians of many specialties deliver ambulatory care, including specialists in family medicine, internal medicine, obstetrics, gynaecology, cardiology, gastroenterology, endocrinology, ophthalmology, dermatology, and geriatrics.
- Clinics: Including ambulatory care clinics, polyclinics, ambulatory surgery centers, and urgent care centers.
  - In the United States, the Urgent Care Association of America (UCAOA) estimates that over 15,000 urgent care centers deliver urgent care services. These centers are designed to evaluate and treat conditions that are not severe enough to require treatment in a hospital emergency department but still require treatment beyond normal physician office hours or before a physician appointment is available. In Russia and other countries of the former Soviet Union, Feldsher health stations are the main site for ambulatory care in rural areas.
- Hospitals: Including emergency departments and other hospital-based services such as same day surgery services and mental health services.
  - Hospital emergency departments: Some visits to emergency departments result in hospital admission, so these would be considered emergency medicine visits rather than ambulatory care. Most visits to hospital emergency departments, however, do not require hospital admission.
- Non-medical institution-based settings: Including school and prison health; vision, dental and pharmaceutical care.
- Non-institution settings: For example, mass childhood immunization campaigns using community health workers.
- Telemedicine: An expanding sector of ambulatory medicine that uses telecommunications and information technology to improve patient access to care; particularly those living in remote regions. Studies have suggested that telemedicine can be effective in delivering adequate patient care including older adults.
  - Due to the COVID-19 pandemic, many countries developed large scale telemedicine frameworks in effort to continue outpatient assessments and follow-ups across various specialties while minimizing the spread of COVID-19.

== Personnel and medical education ==
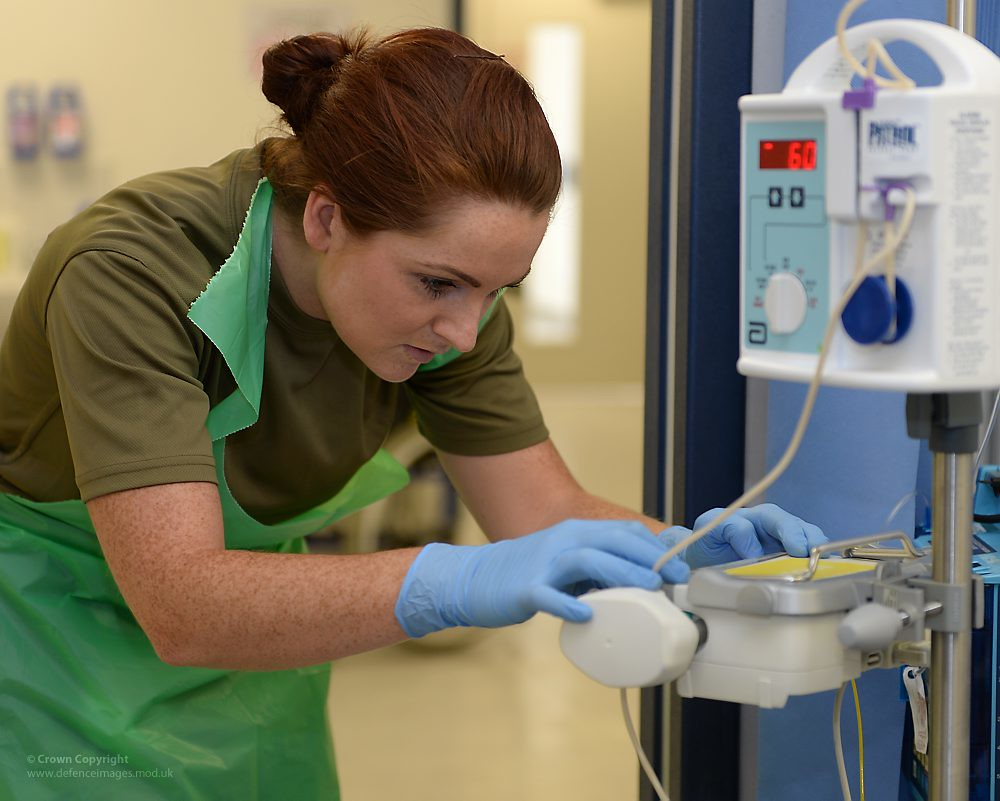
A nurse operating medical equipment in an ambulatory care setting.

Ambulatory care services typically consist of a multidisciplinary team of health professionals that may include (but is not limited to) physicians, nurse practitioners, nurses, pharmacists, occupational therapists, physical therapists, speech therapists, and other allied health professionals.

Given the growth of ambulatory medicine, it has become a significant component of education for medical trainees across various specialties. Over the past decades, internal medicine residency programs across North America have made efforts to incorporate more ambulatory training to the medical education curriculum. The ambulatory medical training is focused on patient management through multidisciplinary teamwork while creating longitudinal continuity in patient care.

== Treatments ==
Ambulatory care sensitive conditions (ACSC) are illnesses or health conditions where appropriate ambulatory care prevents or reduces the need for hospital admission. Appropriate care for an ACSC can include one or more planned revisits to settings of ambulatory care for follow-up, such as when a patient is continuously monitored or otherwise advised to return when (or if) symptoms appear or reappear.

Relatively common ACSC include:

- Angina
- Asthma
- Cancer
- Chronic obstructive pulmonary disease
- Chronic pain
- Congestive heart failure
- Dental conditions
- Diabetes
- Dyslipidemia
- ENT (Ear-nose-throat) diseases
- Epilepsy
- HIV
- Hypertension
- Inflammatory bowel disease
- Influenza, pneumonia and other vaccine-preventable diseases
- Iron-deficiency anemia
- Palliative care
- Pelvic inflammatory disease
- Thromboembolic diseases
- Tuberculosis

Hospitalization for an ambulatory care sensitive conditions is considered to be a measure of access to appropriate primary health care, including preventive and disease management services. While not all admissions for these conditions are avoidable, appropriate ambulatory care could help prevent their onset, control an acute episode, or manage a chronic disease or condition. For Medicaid-covered and uninsured U.S. hospital stays in 2012, six of the top ten diagnoses were ambulatory care sensitive conditions.

== Safety ==
There have been concerns regarding the safety of ambulatory medicine. Some of the common potential sources of harm include errors to medications and diagnostics as well as breakdowns in communications and coordination of care. One major complication of ambulatory care that predisposes to patients to harm is the risk for missing appointments. Missed appointments are common, costly, and can lead to significant delays in both diagnosis and treatment.

Advancements in information technology (IT) have helped to address some safety concerns of ambulatory medicine by minimizing mismanagement of electronic health records (EHR), improving interoperability, and increasing health professionals communication. Some have raised the notion of designing health professionals payment policies with greater focus on safety in addition to patient volumes. Furthermore, strategies for increased patient and caregiver engagement have been heralded as potentially beneficial in both patient care as well as data gathering for patient safety.

== See also ==
- Primary care
- Reason for encounter
- Health care provider
- Ambulatist
- Ambulatory care nursing
- Ambulatory as a medical term
- National Association for Ambulatory Urgent Care
