= Faith community nursing =

Specialty of nursing

Faith Community Nursing, also known as Parish Nursing, Parrish Nursing, Congregational Nursing or Church Nursing, is a movement of over 15,000 registered nurses, primarily in the United States. There are also Parish nurses in Australia, the Bahamas, Canada, England, Ghana, India, Kenya, Korea, Madagascar, Malawi, Malaysia, New Zealand, Nigeria, Palestine, Pakistan, Scotland, Singapore, South Africa, Swaziland, Ukraine, Wales, Zambia and Zimbabwe. Faith community nursing is a practice specialty that focuses on the intentional care of the spirit, promotion of an integrative model of health and prevention and minimization of illness within the context of a community of faith. The intentional integration of the practice of faith with the practice of nursing so that people can achieve wholeness in, with, and through the population which faith community nurses serve.

== Origins ==
Parish nursing began in the mid-1980s in Chicago through the efforts of Rev. Dr. Granger Westberg as a reincarnation of the faith community nursing outreach done by religious orders, such as the "Parish Deaconesses" in Europe and America in the 1800s. Parish nursing is rooted in the Judeo-Christian tradition, and the historic practice of professional nursing, and is consistent with the basic assumptions of many faiths that we care for self and others as an expression of God's love. However, it is not only available to Christian congregations. There are Jewish Congregational Nurses, Muslim Crescent Nurses, and RNs serving in similar capacities within other faith traditions.

Faith Community Nursing (FCN) is recognized as a specialty nursing practice. Faith Community Nursing: Scope and Standards of Practice was approved by the American Nurses Association in 2005 (and updated in 2012) and define the specialty as "...the specialized practice of professional nursing that focuses on the intentional care of the spirit as part of the process of promoting holistic health and preventing or minimizing illness in a faith community." (American Nurses Association, 2012, Faith Community Nursing: Scope and Standards of Practice, Silver Springs, MD: Author, p1). The 16 standards of Faith Community Nursing Practice reflect the specialty's professional values and priorities and provide practice directions and the framework for practice evaluation. Each standard is measurable by a set of specific competencies that serve as evidence of minimal compliance with that standard.

== Approaches ==
Faith community nursing focuses on a holistic approach to patient care. Faith community nursing believes that by promoting a holistic approach this will prevent or minimize illnesses in faith communities (How is faith community nursing the same or different, 2015). Nurses in this specialty, cares for the patient as a whole; physically, emotionally, and spiritually. A good relationship between the nurse and client is vital for this specialty. The role of a faith community nurse is to provide routine spiritual care in partnership with a faith community; it also involves routine implementation and coordination of activities, resourcing and referring. Faith community nurses also maintain the goal of patient care towards holistic functioning. Patients have needs that are not related to clinical nursing. These needs can affect the way they view their care, the way they receive that care, and the way they engage in that care (The Joint Commission, 2010). For some, their faith is their way to cope with illnesses and stress; faith community nursing helps to bring faith and clinical nursing together to achieve this goal.

To become a faith community nurse, the registered nurse must have a minimum of 2 years experience, must have a current license in the state where the faith community is located, and have completed a parish nurse foundations course for the specialty practice as recognized by the American Nurses Association. There are several different curriculum offerings for the faith community nurse which have been developed by a panel of nursing faculty. These are offered though a partnership with the International Parish Nurse Resource Center (IPNRC) at more than 130 nursing schools and health systems around the US and abroad.

Faith community nurses serve in several roles, including: • Health advisor • Educator on health issues • Visitor of church members at home or in the hospital • Provider of referrals to community resources and provide assistance in obtaining needed health services • Developer of support groups within the church • Trainer and coordinator of volunteers • Provider of health screenings Faith community nursing plays a tremendous role in increasing patient outcomes. Through the encouragement of spirituality, faith community nurses decrease post hospitalization adverse events; decrease hospital readmission's and increase patient's ability to thrive at home after hospital discharge. Post hospitalization adverse events can be decreased with the use of faith community nurses, during post hospital follow up care. Medical guidance and education provided by faith community nursing increases patient's adherence. Supportive networks and measure creates leverage when reaching out to hard to reach populations like; poverty stricken, low income, homeless, and medically uninsured individuals. These individuals remain the hardest for health care professionals to keep in touch with after hospital discharge, as well as the most least likely to adhere to medical treatment once discharged. Home visits, follow up care, community services and resources are available to these individuals through the use of faith community nurses. The utilization of social services provides preventative measures, health screening, and education on topics like: exercise, health, and nutritional, to improve the patient's health and disease status. Not only does a faith community nurse improve patient outcomes but they also improve the spiritual, mental and physical well-being of the patient, through counseling and the use of other community health programs (Schroepfer, 2016). (SHarrisCSU) Faith community nurses are not expected to provide patient care in the church or at a patient's home but rather to be a source of referrals for services in the community. They coordinate existing services and supplement them with a holistic dimension of health and caring. A parish nurse program or faith community nurse program can operate in several different ways. Models include: 1) one church supporting its own full or part-time nurse, 2) several churches supporting one nurse, 3) a group of volunteer nurses supporting one or several churches or 4) a nurse related to a hospital or clinic who supports a church or churches as part of his or her job. Of the several thousand faith community nurses, only about 35% in the US are compensated financially for their ministry. In the United States, faith community nurses typically belong to the Health Ministries Association which is the national professional membership organization for faith community nurses. They also have available the International Parish Nurse Resource Center and the American Nurses Association, among others.

The Caribbean has joined the community of Parish Nursing and Health Care Ministry with the launching of Health Care Ministry in The Bahamas. It began with an initial course spanning a three-week period and brought together nurses from various denominations who were commissioned on 27 February 2005. Initially, the Canadian and Australian models of Parish Nursing were introduced to The Bahamas as an extension of the Pastoral Care Ministries of Diocese 2000 & Beyond, a programme of the Anglican Diocese of The Bahamas and Turks & Caicos Islands. To date, more than 60 people have been trained and actively engaged in the ministry as either Parish Nurses or Health & Wellness Carers.

Since the ministry began in 2005 it has grown steadily and was known as the Anglican Diocesan Health Care Ministry [Parish Nursing] Council. However, effective 7 March 2008 the name changed to the Ecumenical Health Care Ministry Council. It is intended that there will be continued training and that the programme will spread throughout the Commonwealth of The Bahamas and the Caribbean. To this end, the ministry will be recognised by the Bahamas Christian Council and by extension the Caribbean Council of Churches (Ecumenical Health Care Ministry, Bahamas).

== Resources for faith community nurses ==
These organizations help to support faith community nursing and serve a wide variety of faith communities:

- International Parish Nurse Resource Center
- Canadian Association for Parish Nursing Ministry
- Australian Faith Community Nurses Association
- Australian Parish Nurse Resource Center
- New Zealand Faith Community Nurses Association
- Greater Lafayette Faith Community Nursing
- Faith Community Nursing/Health Ministries Hosted by Henry Ford Macomb Hospitals
- Parish Nursing Ministries UK
- Faith Community Nurses International - the professional nursing organization for nurses practicing in faith communities. http://www.fcninternational.org/

== Other resources ==
- International Parish Nurse Resource Center
- Parish Nursing and Health Ministry
- FCN/HM Documentation & Reporting System (2000)
