= Genetics nursing =

Nursing specialty

Genetics nursing is a nursing specialty that focuses on providing genetic healthcare to patients.

The integration of genetics into nursing began in the 1980s and has been a slow but important process in improving the quality of healthcare for patients receiving genetic and genomic based care from nurses. Modeling the United Kingdom, the United States critically established a set of essential competencies as a set of guidelines for registered nurses. Through the process of consensus the essential competencies were created by the steering committee, and provided the minimalist competency and scope of practice for registered nurses delivering genetic healthcare to patients.

The Nursing Code of Ethics and other ethical foundations were established for field of genetics nursing to provide regulations when ethical issues develop.

== Background ==
Adopted from the early Christians in 30 AD, the term nurse was created from the Latin origin nutrire, which means to nurture or nourish. Establishing nursing as one of the oldest forms of healthcare and continues to be a growing field of medicine. Genetics, which is the study of inherited traits and their variation is a much more recent field of medicine. The experiments and theories of Gregor Mendel in the mid-19th century helped to introduce the field of genetics into medicine. Genomics is a subset of genetics that compares and analyzes genomes and how the genes interact with one another. Both genetics and genomics help to reveal how closely related we are to each other and to other species. This scientific study is ongoing and strives to interpret health, illness, disease risk, and treatment response. The progress in genetics and genomics is applicable to the entire spectrum of health care and all health professionals and as such to the entire nursing profession. Genetics and genomics are important to healthcare because it provides information in the diagnosis, treatment, and prevention of diseases and illnesses. Even though genetics has been a growing field of medicine since the mid-19th century, the process of integrating genomics into the nursing curriculum, National Council Licensure Examinations, continuing education, and certification was not highlighted until the 1980s. Genetics and genomics are fundamental to the nursing practice because the basis of genetics can recognize individuals at risk for certain illnesses and diseases, identify the risks of certain disease or illnesses when conceiving children, facilitate drug dosage or selection for certain illnesses or specific patients, and genetics promotes benefits in treatment of particular ailments.

However, it took twenty more years until the Health Recourses and Services Administration (HRSA) stressed the significance of incorporating genetics into nursing education. After HRSA's proposal, there was minor advancement and the development that was established contained a lot of inconsistency. The progress of integration continued to be slow and limited. By fall of 2005, only 30% of academic nursing programs contained a curriculum thread in genetics and genomics. One of the leading factors in the limited progress of genetics integration is the relevance to all nursing practice is not fully appreciated by many, and genetics is also seen by many nurses to be a subspecialty. Also state boards of nursing do not require competency in genomics and genetics as part of licensure and genetics and genomics are not considered in the evaluations of accrediting bodies. The extremely large size and variation of the nursing workforce provides an extra challenge in the many existing barriers needed to be overcome for genetics to be implemented. Some of the first successful training of genetic practices in the nursing workforce can be seen in the United Kingdom. The main aspect of the U.K.’s strategy was simplicity. They achieved this by constructing seven essential competencies that were applied to the entire nursing profession. In 2003, the U.K. National Health Service created the NHS National Genetics Education and Development Centre. The main functions of these programs were to enhance genetics education and to dispense materials and resources for educators of all genetic professions. The United States mirrored the efforts and ideas established in the U.K. and adopted similar methods and competencies. The U.S. National Human Genome Research Institute and the National Cancer Institute of the National Institutes of Health united to initiate strategies, training programs, committees, and define the competencies.

== Competencies ==
=== Development ===
The genetic and genomic competencies are important to the practice of all nurses regardless of academic preparation, practice setting, role, or specialty. The competencies are significant because they establish a foundation and set of guidelines for the nursing workforce on administering the minimal amount of genetic and genomic based healthcare. Since the competencies would only reflect the minimalist amount of genetic and genomic based healthcare, they were specifically drawn up to focus on the scope of practice for registered nurses. This was done because a registered nurse is a general level of practice for nursing and requires that one has graduated from a college or university nursing program and has passed the NCLEX. The NCLEX is a national licensing exam that signifies minimal competency in practicing nursing if passed.

To begin the development of the competencies, the initial strategy of the U.S. National Human Genome Research Institute and the National Cancer Institute of the National Institutes of Health established the steering committee. It was composed of nurse leaders from a variety of professional nursing agencies, academic settings, and organizations. Two of the major nursing leaders, Jean Jenkins, RN, PhD, FAAN and Kathleen Calzone, RN, MSN, APNG, FAAN were chosen as the Co-Chairs of the committee. The committee's fundamental function was to generate a mechanism for establishing competencies by recognizing, examining, and comparing existing published competencies. The published competencies that were being examined targeted all health care professionals, specifically those practicing genetics, nurses with bachelor's degrees, and advanced practice nurses. After the published competencies were reviewed carefully, the developing of the essential competencies was produced in four phases called the process of consensus.

During phase I of the process of consensus, a subset of the committee was created to synthesize competencies from the documents under review that would apply to all registered nurses; then the steering committee reviewed, modified, and approved the recommended competencies. In 2005, nurse representatives of the National Coalition for Health Professional Education in Genetics also reviewed the proposed competencies and made modifications. Throughout phase II, the American Nursing Association published the competencies during a meeting in 2006 and requested judgment, thoughts, and comments from the public, specifically targeting the insight from the nursing community. The 10 comments that were received were recorded and evaluated and the majority of them showed support. Phase III consisted of establishing consensus on the final draft of the essential competencies by the steering committee and the consensus panel, which is also made up of a variety of nursing leaders in different organizations and settings. The steering committee also constructed strategies for integrating genetic and genomic information into education and practice such as the NCLEX exam, accreditation programs, certification processes, and nursing curriculum. In March 2006, phase IV occurred and consisted of endorsing the final document by the Nursing Organizations Alliance member organizations.

=== Essential Competencies ===
The essential competencies consists of two domains: professional responsibilities and professional practice. Under the professional responsibilities domain, all professional activities by registered nurses are required to fall within the confines of the Nursing: Scope and Standards of Practice produced by the American Nurses Association.

Also, competent nursing practice now requires the incorporation of genetic and genomic knowledge and skills in order to:

- Recognize when one's own attitudes and values related to genetic and genomic science may affect care provided to clients.
- Advocate for clients access to desired genetic/genomic services and/or resources including support groups.
- Examine competency of practice on a regular basis, identifying areas of strength, as well as areas in which professional development related to genetics and genomics would be beneficial.
- Incorporate genetic and genomic technologies and information into registered nurse practice.
- Demonstrate in practice the importance of tailoring genetic and genomic information and services to clients based on their culture, religion, knowledge level, literacy and preferred language.
- Advocate for the rights of all clients for autonomous, informed genetic and genomic-related decision-making and voluntary action.

The competencies for the registered nurse, under the professional practice domain, includes: nursing assessment, which is the application and integration of genetic and genomic knowledge, identification, referral activities, and provision of education, care, and support.

Nursing Assessment for the registered nurse includes:

- Demonstrates an understanding of the relationship of genetics and genomics to health, prevention, screening, diagnostics, prognostics, selection of treatment, and monitoring of treatment effectiveness.
- Demonstrates ability to elicit a minimum of three-generation family health history.
- Constructs a pedigree from collected family history information using standardized symbols and terminology.
- Collects personal, health, and developmental histories that consider genetic, environmental, and genomic influences and risks.
- Conducts comprehensive health and physical assessments which incorporate knowledge about genetic, environmental, and genomic influences and risk factors.
- Critically analyzes the history and physical assessment findings for genetic, environmental, and genomic influences and risk factors.
- Assesses clients’ knowledge, perceptions, and responses to genetic and genomic information.
- Develops a plan of care that incorporates genetic and genomic assessment information.

Identification for the registered nurse includes:

- Identifies clients who may benefit from specific genetic and genomic information and/or services based on assessment data.
- Identifies credible, accurate, appropriate and current genetic and genomic information, resources, services and/or technologies specific to given clients.
- Identifies ethical, ethnic/ancestral, cultural, religious, legal, fiscal, and societal issues related to genetic and genomic information and technologies.
- Defines issues that undermine the rights of all clients for autonomous, informed genetic and genomic-related decision-making and voluntary action.

Referral Activities for the registered nurse includes:

- Facilitates referrals for specialized genetic and genomic services for clients as needed.

Provision of support, care, and education for the registered nurse includes:

- Provides clients with interpretation of selective genetic and genomic information or services .
- Provides clients with credible, accurate, appropriate and current genetic and genomic information, resources, services, and/or technologies that facilitate decision-making.
- Uses health promotion and disease prevention practices to:
- Considers genetic and genomic influences on personal and environmental risk factors.
- Incorporates knowledge of genetic and/or genomic risk factors (e.g., a client with a genetic predisposition for high cholesterol who can benefit from a change in lifestyle that will decrease the likelihood that the genetic risk will be expressed) .
- Uses genetic and genomic-based interventions and information to improve clients’ outcomes.
- Collaborates with healthcare providers in providing genetic and genomic healthcare.
- Collaborates with insurance providers and payers to facilitate reimbursement for genetic and genomic healthcare services.
- Performs interventions and treatments appropriate to clients’ genetics and genomic healthcare needs.
- Evaluates impact and effectiveness of genetic and genomic technology, information, interventions, and treatments on clients’ outcome.

== Issues ==
=== Ethical ===
Ethics pertain to the ‘’rightness’’ and ‘’wrongness’’ of human actions, motives, and conduct. Complicated ethical issues in areas such as justice, privacy, and autonomy, tend to follow both the field of genetics and the field of nursing. Ethical problems and dilemmas arise daily in healthcare settings for both the patient and health care provider. For example, all patients and individuals have the right to receive equal health care regardless of gender, religious beliefs, status, or race. A Code of Ethics for Nursing was created by the American Nurses Association, which provides rules, regulations, and guidelines to follow when making a decision that is ethical based. These regulations were mainly established to help provide equal healthcare, protect the rights, safety, and privacy of the patient, and to hold nurses accountable for their actions and choices. Genetics can create ethical issues in nursing for a variety of different situations. Many scenarios, questions, and debates have been encountered such as what individuals can receive genetic testing or information? Who owns or controls the information received from the genetic test and how can the owner use that information? However, the code of ethics does not address genetics or genomics specifically, so ethical foundations were also established to help guide genetics into health care. The foundations provide a set of guidelines to understand and manage an ethical issue if one should arise, and to assist in the translation of genetics into the healthcare environment.
