= Nurse attorney =

Individual who is licensed as both lawyer and nurse

Nurse attorneys are individuals who are licensed as both lawyers and nurses. Nurse attorneys are found in a number of practice areas including academia, administrative law, litigation, risk management & patient safety, and regulatory compliance.
