= Granger E. Westberg =

Lutheran pastor and author (1913–1999)

Granger E Westberg (July 13, 1913 – February 16, 1999) was a Lutheran clergyman and professor best known for his book, Good Grief, and for creating the parish nurse program, now an international movement called faith community nursing. Westberg was a pioneer in exploring and encouraging the interrelationship of religion and medicine and in fostering holistic health care. He held the first joint appointment in medicine and religion at a major university (the University of Chicago).

== Early life and education ==
Westberg was born July 11, 1913, in Chicago to Swedish immigrant parents, Alma Ahlstrom and John Westberg. He received his bachelor's degree from Augustana College in Rock Island, Illinois, in 1935. Four years later he graduated from Augustana Theological Seminary (now Lutheran School of Theology at Chicago). At Augustana College, Granger met his future wife, Helen Johnson, with whom he had four children.

== Career ==
=== Early career ===
In 1939 Westberg began his career as a parish pastor and brought a dying church in Bloomington, Illinois, back to life. It was a rich experience but it was to be his last position as parish pastor.

In the early 1940s, when most of the few existing hospital chaplains were part-time elderly ministers, young Westberg saw the potential for clergy making a more significant contribution to the care of patients. Traditionally chaplains handed out religious pamphlets and prayed with as many patients as possible. Westberg thought that appropriately educated chaplains could have meaningful conversations with patients and their families and that they could provide an important perspective as part of a health care team. When the chaplain at Augustana Hospital in Chicago retired, Westberg applied for the job. His mentors cautioned Westberg that he was throwing away a promising career in the ministry. After some changes in the job description, Westberg accepted the position as full-time chaplain at Augustana.

=== Pastoral care ===
Before starting work, Westberg took six months to prepare himself. Like most ministers, Westberg's education had been highly theoretical and classroom-based with little help in developing needed practical skills, such as counseling. So Westberg took hands-on courses with pioneers in the new field of clinical pastoral education, such as Anton Boisen at Elgin State Hospital and Rollin Fairbanks at Massachusetts General Hospital. Russell Dicks, who with physician, Richard Cabot, had written the important book, The Art of Ministering to the Sick, had recently moved to Chicago. Dicks, who was chaplain at a nearby hospital, was Westberg's mentor and quickly became his collaborator and friend. At their hospitals, Dicks and Westberg created popular, intensive courses in pastoral care for ordained ministers, chaplains, and seminarians. Both were part of creating organizations, such as the Association of Protestant Hospital Chaplains (later called the College of Chaplains) that set standards and accreditation policies for hospital chaplains.

At the time Westberg was at Augustana Hospital, many nurses around the country were often treated as "handmaidens" to doctors. By working closely with nurses, Westberg was persuaded that nurses made a significant contribution to patient care. Rather than being in the demeaning role of handmaiden, Westberg thought nurses should be part of the health care team. Based on a curriculum he developed and taught for Augustana's School of Nursing, Westberg wrote a book called Nurse, Pastor, and Patient. In 1951 Westberg became chaplain of the University of Chicago Clinics. His work with students and faculty members in both theology and medicine led in 1956 to him being given a joint appointment in both the Chicago Divinity School and the school of medicine at the University of Chicago. Westberg continued focusing on religion and health and a team approach to health care, using strategies such as interdisciplinary case conferences. He also wrote and talked about what he called "whole-person care".

=== Writing and teaching ===
In 1962 Westberg's interest in the grief process resulted in his writing Good Grief, a book that is still selling well more than 50 years after its first publication. At the time of Westberg's death, the work had sold more than 2.4 million copies and was the top-selling book in the history of Augsburg Fortress, the official publisher of the Evangelical Lutheran Church in America. In 1964 Westberg became the dean of the Institute of Religion, which was located in the heart of the Texas Medical Center in Houston and linked to five Texas seminaries, providing a graduate program in pastoral care and counseling. With an academic appointment as professor of medicine and religion in the Department of Psychiatry of Baylor College of Medicine, Westberg tried to build more interaction between doctors and ministers. In addition to the seminarians existing clinical experiences in hospitals, he introduced clinical experiences for seminarians in churches.

Westberg argued that seminarians should have clinical experiences throughout their theological education. A few years later, as a professor at Hamma School of Theology (now Trinity Lutheran Seminary, he was able to help nudge the Hamma curriculum in this direction. At Hamma he also responded to the national need for more preventive and primary care by creating a model "neighborhood church-based clinic", where physicians, pastoral counselors, nurses, seminarians and medical students and community volunteers provided needed care.

In the early 1970s when Westberg moved to the University of Illinois at Chicago (UIC), he worked with a team in creating several "wholistic health centers". Like the church-based clinics in Springfield, they focused on prevention, whole-person care, and the church as a healing community. Increasingly it was clear that nurses were key members of the health team. Westberg remained at UIC until 1981.

=== Faith community nursing ===
In the mid 1980s, when most of his peers were retiring, Westberg launched the parish nurse project in which nurses, each based in one or more churches, used their talents and the talents of others in the congregation to promote health, prevent illness, and care for those in need. The program began at Lutheran General Hospital in Park Ridge, Illinois. Established as a three-year program through a grant from the W. K. Kellogg Foundation, the operation began with six registered nurses.

== Later life and death ==
Westberg lived in Willowbrook, Illinois, during his later years. He died on February 16, 1999. The week after his death, the Daily Herald reported that more than 3,000 nurses were involved in parish nursing in the United States.

== Honors ==
Westberg received an honorary doctorate from Augustana College in 1956. Late in life, he received the Amicus Certus (True Friend) Award from Lutheran Social Services of Illinois and the Modern Samaritan Award from the Alexian Brothers Medical Center.

== Legacy ==
The scope of parish nursing has expanded over the years, so it is now called faith community nursing. There are 15,000 participating nurses, primarily in the United States. Faith community nurses are also working in Australia, the Bahamas, Canada, England, Ghana, India, Kenya, Korea, Madagascar, Malawi, Malaysia, New Zealand, Nigeria, Palestine, Pakistan, Scotland, Singapore, South Africa, Swaziland, Ukraine, Wales, Zambia and Zimbabwe.

In 2011, the Health Ministries Association established the Granger Westberg Leadership in Faith Community Nursing Award to recognize outstanding faith community nurses.

== Selected bibliography ==
- —— (1955). Nurse, Pastor, Patient. Rock Island: Augustana Press. OCLC 1828954.
- —— (April 1957). "The interrelationship of the ministry and medicine". Pastoral Psychology. 8 (3): 9–15. doi:10.1007/BF01744313.
- —— (1958). "The 'new' field of religion and medicine". Postgraduate Medicine. 23 (6): 668–671. doi:10.1080/00325481.1958.11692122. PMID 13567190.
- —— (October 1959). "The hospital chaplain's contribution to physician-clergy cooperation". The Pharos of Alpha Omega Alpha Honor Medical Society. 22 (4): 217–221.
- —— (May 1960). "The role of the clergyman in mental health". Pastoral Psychology. 11 (4): 19–22. doi:10.1007/BF01763105.
- —— (1961). Minister and Doctor Meet. New York: Harper and Row. OCLC 564640.
- —— (1962). Good Grief. Philadelphia: Augsburg Fortress Press. OCLC 988626117.
- —— (1979). "From hospital chaplaincy to wholistic health center". The Journal of Pastoral Care. 33 (2): 76–82. doi:10.1177/002234097903300203. PMID 10242226.
- —— (October 1984). "Churches are joining the health care team". Urban Health. 13 (9): 34–36. PMID 10269596.
- —— (Fall 1986). "The role of congregations in preventive medicine". Journal of Religion and Health. 25 (3): 193–197. doi:10.1007/BF01534015. PMID 24301618.
- —— (1988). "What a congregation looks like that takes wholistic health seriously". In Wiest, Walter E. (ed.). Health Care and Its Costs: A Challenge for the Church. Lanham, MD: University Press of America. pp. 320–328. ISBN 0-8191-7129-8.
- ——; McNamara, Jill Westberg (1990). The Parish Nurse: Providing a Minister of Health for Your Congregation. Minneapolis: Augsburg Press.
