= Association for the Advancement of Wound Care =

Organization

- Formation: 1995
- Type: Professional Association
- Headquarters: Middleton, WI
- Official language: English
- Website: aawconline.org

The Association for the Advancement of Wound Care (AAWC) is a non-profit organization that takes a multi-disciplinary approach to the care of wounds. Their official journal is the Ostomy Wound Management.
