= Japanese Hospital =

Japanese Hospital may refer to:

- Japanese Hospital (Saipan), listed on the National Register of Historic Places in N. Mariana Islands
- Japanese Hospital (Rota), listed on the National Register of Historic Places in N. Mariana Islands
- Japanese Hospital (Los Angeles), a hospital established in Boyle Heights in 1929 to serve L.A.'s Japanese community
