= National Association for Ambulatory Urgent Care =

The National Association for Ambulatory Urgent Care, or NAFAC, is a national professional organization for ambulatory care clinic owners and physicians specializing in ambulatory care. The association was founded in 1973. As of July 2006, the group had about 500 members representing roughly 1,700 clinics. Members include single office urgent care centers, primary care physicians, urgent-care chain facilities, ambulatory surgery centers, and large healthcare systems across the United States.

NAFAC publishes a reference titled Bill's Book: Developing Urgent Care Centers. The Association, also, offers the National Urgent Care Practice Standards Certification as a voluntary, self-administered method for urgent care centers to improve quality measures without the hassles of preparing for outside inspection teams.
