= Helsana =

Swiss health insurance company

Helsana AG
- Company type: Aktiengesellschaft
- Industry: Insurance
- Founded: 1996
- Headquarters: Dübendorf, Zürich, Switzerland
- Key people: Roman Sonderegger (CEO); Thomas Szucs (Chairman)
- Revenue: 9 Billion CHF (2025)
- Number of employees: 3,700 (2025)
- Website: www.helsana.ch

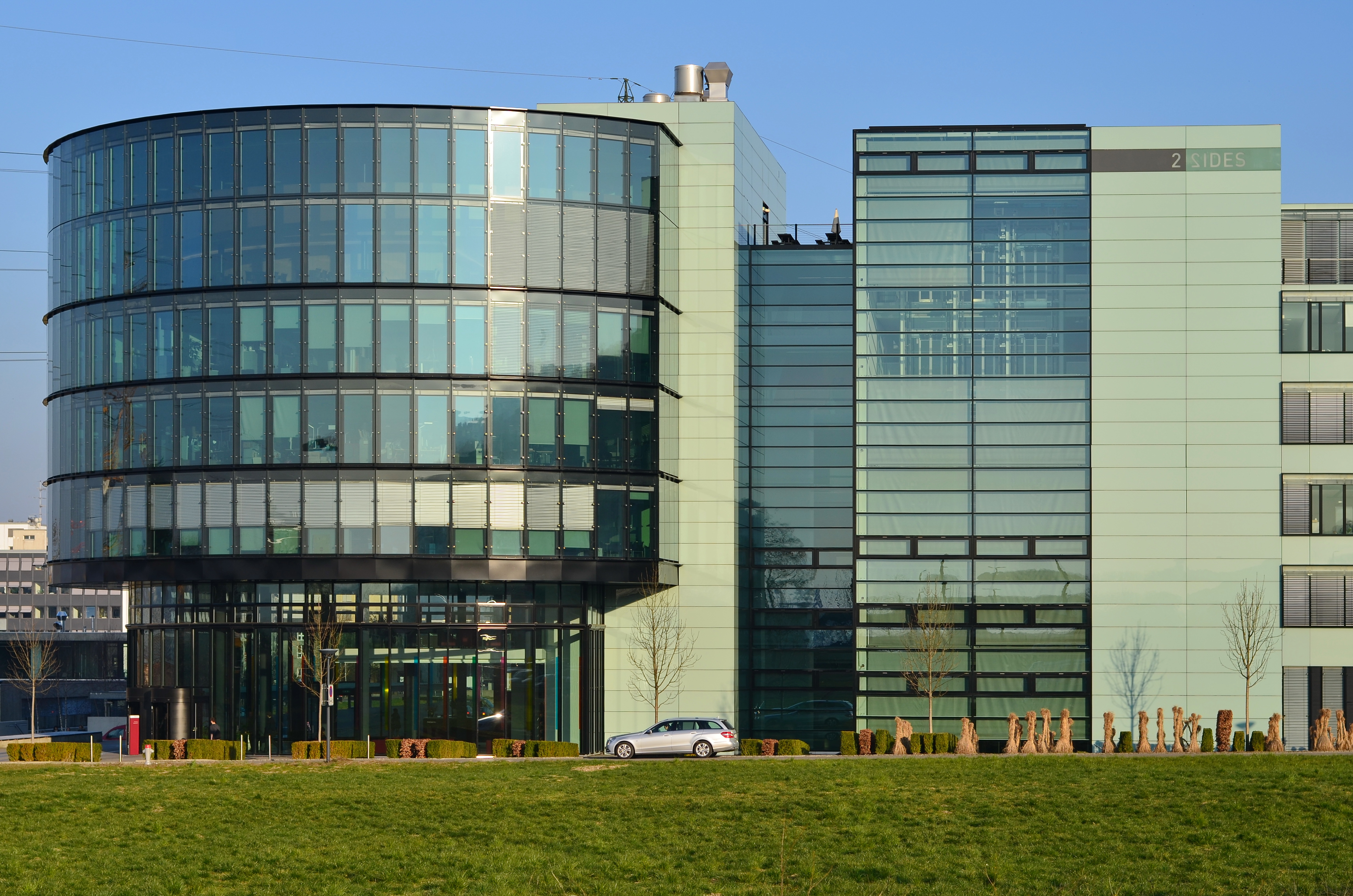
Headquarters of Helsana in Dübendorf, Switzerland

Helsana's logo until 2008

The company Helsana Ltd with headquarters in Dübendorf, is a Swiss insurance group specialising in health insurance. With over 1,53 million customers and premium volume of 9 billion Swiss francs, the Helsana Group is one of Switzerland’s leading health and accident insurers. The group of companies has roughly 3,700 employees and features a Swiss network of 13 general agencies and 27 sales offices. The company name Helsana is composed of the names of the former health insurance companies Helvetia and Artisana, which merged in 1996.

== Founding ==
In 1996, Helsana emerged from the merger of the two health and accident insurance companies, Helvetia and Artisana. The company’s roots can be traced back to the year 1899, which is when Helvetia was founded as a cooperative health insurance company.

=== Development of Helvetia and Artisana ===
In 1971, Helvetia had over one million members, with more than 1,200 branches in German-speaking Switzerland, western Switzerland (first branch in Freiburg in 1903) and in Ticino (first branch in Bellinzona in 1906). Artisana, which was founded in Berne in 1952, developed over the course of decades – from an insurer specialising in daily allowance insurance for the construction industry to an all-rounder in the health insurance sector.

=== Merger ===
In 1996, the delegates of Helvetia and Artisana resolved to merge into Helsana. In this regard, they followed a trend in the industry (in 1940 the number of health insurance companies in Switzerland was still 1,147, but in 1990 there were 246), but the merger was also seen as an important step in strengthening the competitive position of both insurance companies. The merger made it possible to offer a wider range of services and consolidate an even stronger presence on the market.

Helvetia and Artisana were both absorbed by an association that today constitutes the [shareholder base of Helsana. The foundation Fondation Sana, formerly Stiftung Helvetia Sana, holds 79% of the share capital, while the foundation Artisana, formerly Verein Artisana, holds 21%.

== Business Area ==
Helsana operates in the fields of basic insurance, supplementary insurance and accident insurance. As of 1 January 2017, the former basic insurance subsidiaries were merged – Avanex with Helsana, and Sansan Insurance Company Ltd. with Progrès Insurance Company Ltd. – which meant that Avanex and Sansan disappeared from the market. Aerosana, another former subsidiary, merged with Progrès on 1 January 2011. Finally, in 2022, the basic insurance subsidiary Progrès was integrated into Helsana Insurance Company Ltd.

The core business of the Helsana Group is basic insurance pursuant to the Swiss Federal Health Insurance Act. This accounts for roughly 70% of the total premium income. The field of supplementary insurance is the second key element, representing 27% of premium income. The Group also provides group daily allowance and accident insurance to businesses and associations, as well as occupational pensions.
