= Correctional nursing =

Nursing for prisoners

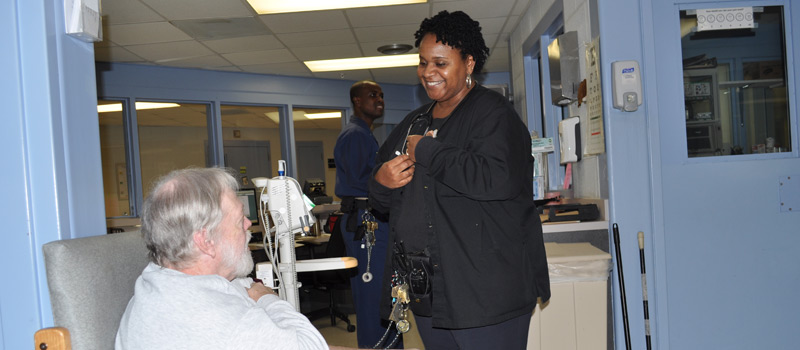
A correctional nurse working in an American prison

Correctional nursing or forensic nursing is nursing as it relates to prisoners. Nurses are required in prisons, jails, and detention centers; their job is to provide physical and mental healthcare for detainees and inmates. In these correctional settings, nurses are the primary healthcare providers. These nurses also work with crime victims and assist in expert witness testimonies, and are involved in a variety of legal cases, including paternity disputes and workplace injuries.

== Roles ==
Correctional facilities vary widely in size and population. Correspondingly, there is a wide range of roles which correctional nurses fill. Some facilities are as large as small cities and include an in-house hospital with inpatient and emergency facilities. Most correctional nurses fall into four categories: Reception Screening, Chronic Care Clinicians, Medication Administration, and Ambulatory Care (often called "sick call").

=== Intake screening ===
Intake screening (also known as R&R, or Reception and Release Screening) is the process where a nurse evaluates an inmate who is new to an institution before they are moved to their housing unit. Custodial officers use this information in order to decide which part of the facility is appropriate for a particular inmate, and will sometimes call for an inmate to be moved to another facility if the inmate's medical or mental health needs cannot be met at the initial placement. The nurse performing intake screening generally schedules the inmate for an appointment with a healthcare provider for a detailed medical history and physical examination depending on the inmate's needs and presence of chronic diseases.

=== Chronic care clinicians ===
Inmates with chronic health concerns, such as asthma, diabetes, or high blood pressure, generally have regularly scheduled appointments at chronic care clinics, where nurses provide patient assessments and education about chronic health concerns. Generally, these clinics are overseen by a mid-level provider, such as a physician or nurse practitioner.

=== Medication administration ===
Medications, even over-the-counter ones, can be misused in a correctional environment, so medications are usually administered to patients via a medication pass or queue system. Inmates requiring regularly scheduled medication either report to a nurse located centrally in a medical unit, or receive their doses in their housing unit. In higher-security areas, where movement is more restricted and inmates are largely confined to cells, medications are administered at the cell front.

=== Nursing sick call ===
Inmates requiring episodic healthcare generally follow a process called Sick Call. After requesting treatments generally by completing a form (sometimes called a "Sick Call Slip"), a nurse meets with the patient. Most facilities have standardized protocols for conditions like headache, athlete's foot, and constipation, which can be treated with over-the-counter medication without the need for a physician or other advanced medical provider. An assessment of a more serious condition, or one that falls outside the protocols, is referred to a medical provider for further evaluation.

=== Correctional nursing and mental illness ===
According to the National Alliance of Mental Health reports in 2019 roughly 40% of all people with mental illness will be introduced to the criminal justice system (2 million). Of the inmates incarcerated in the many different types of facilities, 25% have mental illness (550,000 on any day). In 2017 State and Federal Governments paid more than $150 billion to incarcerate these individuals and their stays in the system are usually 4 times longer than other patients.

Treating those patients is quite difficult. Prisons rely on security over healthcare, and expression of care from nurses is restricted due to budget limitations, patient restrictions and ethical unknowns. Making their care even more difficult is the fact that many inmates in correctional justice facilities have lost their rights and are limited in what they are allowed to receive and the measure of their care leading to a dehumanizing of patients. Another main problem of nursing mental illness in correctional facilities is the overwhelming association with these patients and the likelihood they will end up in solitary confinement, which greatly compounds their mental status. Nurses training in the criminal justice system must be prepared for these problems in their daily practices.

=== Common careers in correctional nursing ===
When it comes to establishing a career in correctional/forensic nursing, there are many avenues one can undertake which can include sexual assault nurse examiner, nurse coroner, nurse attorney or a forensic nurse examiner.

=== Community health--prison populations ===
When one enters into a correctional facility, the presence of health care should not go away. The patients in prison populations are at a greater risk for health complications, especially if there are untreated, underlying chronic health conditions. Some of the most common health concerns for those in prison include communicable diseases, including HIV/AIDS, hepatitis, and tuberculosis. These remain an issue for this population due to the prisoners engaging in high-risk behaviors including unprotected sexual contact. For the older adult prison population (aged 50 years and above), common chronic health conditions reported include diabetes, hypertension, arthritis, cancer, and respiratory disorders such as asthma and emphysema.

For women in prison, there are more components that need to be considered to ensure their overall health. Also, with the common chronic conditions as listed above, there needs to be increased access to reproductive health services including gynecological exams. There also needs to be improved mental health processes for women in prison. For some, there have been increased reports of self-harm and suicide while in prison when compared to the male prisoner demographic. The root causes of this issue are related to being isolated, being detained in locations away from loved ones, and bullying from other prisoners. To further address these needs, improvements must be made to assessment screenings of the women prisoners, which involves addressing the patient's history of trauma, as well as the offering of social support services.
