= Wound, ostomy, and continence nursing =

Specialism in nursing

Wound, ostomy, and continence nursing is a nursing specialty involved with the treatment of patients with acute and chronic wounds, patients with an ostomy (those who have had some kind of bowel or bladder diversion), and patients with incontinence conditions (those with issues of bladder control, bowel control, and associated skin care). Nurses in this specialty are often referred to as wound, ostomy, and continence nurses (WOC nurses). They use evidence-based knowledge and skills to manage the care of these patients, whose needs can often be complex. In the United States, certification is available for this specialty from the Wound, Ostomy and Continence Nursing Certification Board; for example, the postnominals "CWON" represent the title of Certified Wound and Ostomy Nurse. There are additional organizations that offer varying levels of certification in this field (e.g., American Board of Wound Management).

In some countries, such as the United Kingdom, WOC nursing is not seen as its own specialty but instead falls into other specialties such as tissue viability nursing or stoma care nursing.

== Practice ==
WOC nurses are found in all healthcare settings, including hospitals, long-term care facilities and outpatient clinics. They work with patients who have acute or chronic wounds, fistulas or ostomies. They may assist patients who have other bowel or bladder disorders.

== Certification ==
=== In the United States ===
Specialty certification for WOC nurses is available through the Wound, Ostomy and Continence Nursing Certification Board (WOCNCB). Nurses and other healthcare professionals may also earn the Certified Wound Specialist (CWS) certification through the American Board of Wound Management.

== See also ==
- List of nursing specialties
