= Nursing in Spain =

Nursing in Spain is regulated by the General Council of Official Associations of Nursing (Organización Colegial de Enfermería).

== Migration ==
Nurses and health visitors in Spain are required to accumulate points to demonstrate the accumulation of experience to the regulator. Within the European Union points can be accumulated from experience in other EU countries, but Brexit would mean that experience in the United Kingdom would no longer count. As a result it appeared in early 2019 that Spanish nurses, where 3,370 were working in the National Health Service, were leaving the UK and returning to Spain or moving to Ireland. In 2015 there was a big and successful recruitment exercise for the NHS in Spain, although there were issues connected to the command of English language.

== See also ==
- History of Nursing in the United Kingdom
- Category:Nursing by country
