= Telenursing =

Nursing care through telecoms

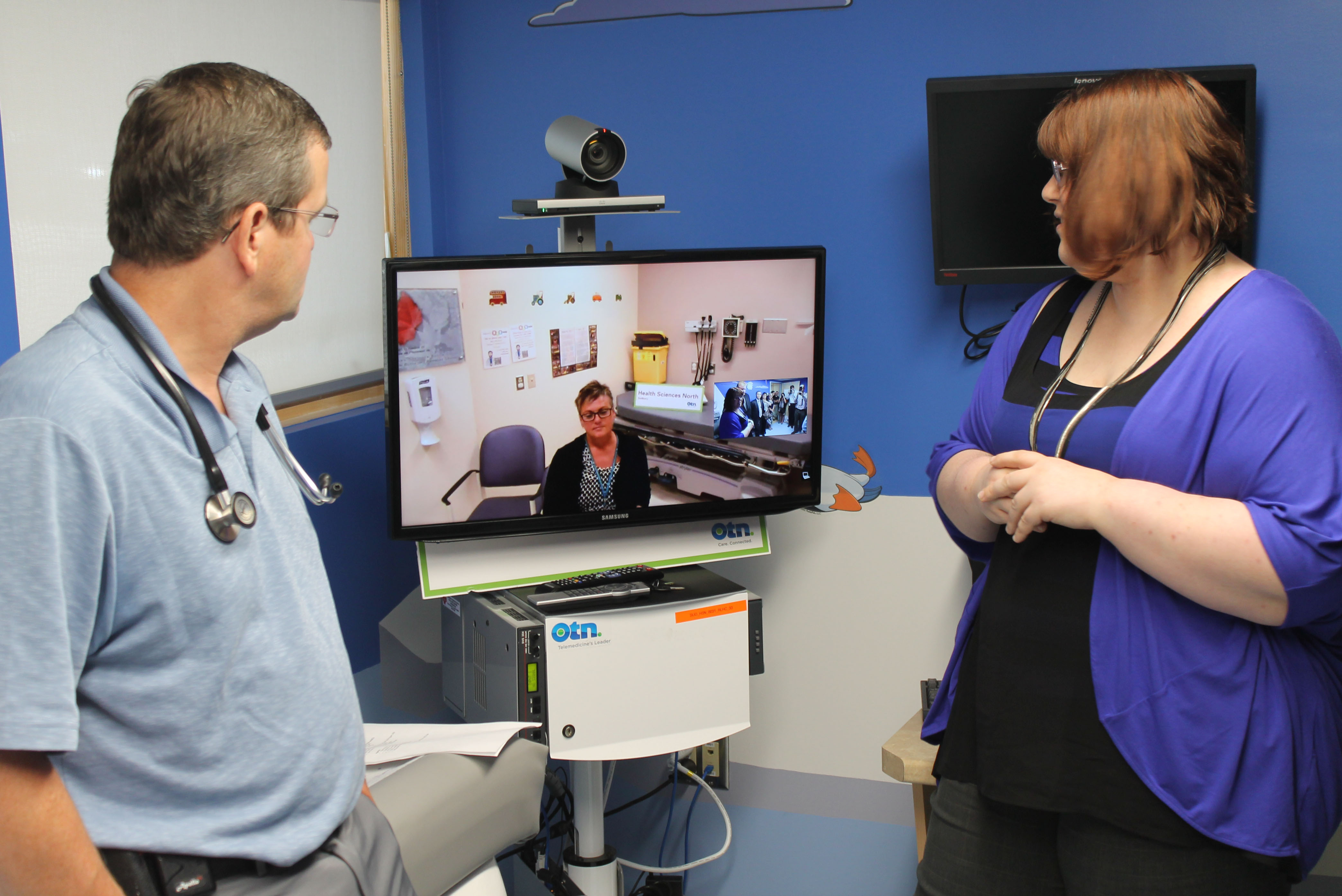
New telecommunication equipment for nurses and doctors at Health Sciences North/Horizon Santé-Nord (HSN) in Ontario, Canada.

Telenursing refers to the use of information technology in the provision of nursing services whenever physical distance exists between patient and nurse, or between any number of nurses. As a field, it is part of telemedicine, and has many points of contacts with other medical and non-medical applications, such as telediagnosis, teleconsultation, and telemonitoring. The field, however, is still being developed as the information on telenursing isn't comprehensive enough.

Telenursing is growing in many countries because of the preoccupation in driving down the costs of health care, an increase in the number of aging and chronically ill population, and the increase in coverage of health care to distant, rural, small or sparsely populated regions. Among its many benefits, telenursing may help solve increasing shortages of nurses; to reduce distances and save travel time, and to keep patients out of hospital. A greater degree of job satisfaction has been registered among telenurses.

== Telenursing and nursing informatics ==
Nursing informatics, a branch of health informatics, has been defined by Judith Rae Graves and Sheila Corcoran as "a combination of computer science, information science, and nursing science designed to assist in the management and processing of nursing data, information, and knowledge to support the practice of nursing and the delivery of nursing care". Telenursing is a potential application of nursing informatics and as such, nursing informatics has served as a critical background concept its development.

== Applications ==
=== Home care ===
One of the most distinctive telenursing applications is home care. For example, patients who are immobilized, or live in remote or difficult to reach places, citizens who have chronic ailments, such as chronic obstructive pulmonary disease, diabetes, congestive heart disease, or debilitating diseases, such as neural degenerative diseases (Parkinson's disease, Alzheimer's disease or ALS), may stay at home and be "visited" and assisted regularly by a nurse via videoconferencing, internet or videophone. Other applications of home care are the care of patients in immediate post-surgical situations, the care of wounds, ostomies or disabled individuals. In normal home health care, one nurse is able to visit up to 5-7 patients per day. Using telenursing, one nurse can "visit" 12-16 patients in the same amount of time.

=== Case management ===
A common application of telenursing is also used by call centers operated by managed care organizations, which are staffed by registered nurses who act as case managers or perform patient triage, information and counseling as a means of regulating patient access and flow and decrease the use of emergency rooms.

=== Telephone triage ===
Telephone triage refers to symptom or clinically based calls. Clinicians perform symptom assessment by asking detailed questions about the patient's illness or injury. The clinician's task is to estimate and/or rule out urgent symptoms. They may use pattern recognition and other problem-solving process as well. Clinicians may utilize guidelines, in paper or electronic format, to determine how urgent the symptoms are. Telephone triage requires clinicians to evaluate symptoms and provide health advice which guides patients to the appropriate level of care, (emergent, urgent, or nonurgent) according to their condition and symptoms. Telephone triage staff also provides advice for self‐care at home for nonurgent patients. It may involve educating and advising clients, and making safe, effective, and appropriate dispositions—all by telephone. Telephone triage takes place in settings as diverse as emergency rooms, ambulance services, large call centers, physician offices, clinics, student health centers and hospices.

=== Telephone Triage Reducing Emergency Department Visits ===
Telephone triage services are beneficial in decreasing the amount of nonemergent patient visits to emergency departments. Emergency departments typically experience high patient volumes, many of which are nonemergent. Emergency department waiting areas may become overcrowded with patients due to the high patient volumes, resulting in many patients leaving without being seen. The telephone triage staff has access to the electronic health records generated by a health system encounters. The ability to access patients' health records helps the triage staff evaluate the patient more efficient due to the provided information such as allergies and comorbidities. Having access to patients' health records provides demographic information which allows the triage staff to send emergency services to the patient if necessary. Telephone triage service can help to decrease lower-acuity patient visits to an emergency department by properly evaluating patients symptoms and guiding them to the appropriate level of care.

==== Countries using telephone triage ====
An international telenursing survey was completed in 2005, reporting that the 719 responding full-time and part-time registered nurses and advanced practice nurses worked as a telenurse in 36 countries around the world. 68% were reported to be working in the United States, compared to only 0.6% in Finland. Some of these 36 countries include Australia, Canada, Norway, United Kingdom, New Zealand, Iran, Sweden, and the Netherlands.

==== In Australia ====
In Australia, telephone triages are conducted in all states of Australia, the largest services are federal and state government funded, known as Nurse-On-Call in Victoria, Healthdirect in all other states and territories except Queensland where the state government supports its own separate service known as 13HEALTH. The first telenursing triage was conducted in Western Australia in 1999, where Triage nurses would estimate patient complexity and refer them to Fremantle Hospital. Due to the remoteness of the Australian landscape it is vital that residents living in rural areas have access to clinical support and care. Telenursing allows nurses to overcome the barriers of distance and gives them the opportunity assist those who are unable to access health care clinics or services due to either the late hour or the distance.

=== Mental health ===
Telenursing has also been utilized in mental health applications. Telepsychiatry (also known as telemental health) can be effective in improving symptoms and quality of life among people with mental health disorders. It is especially useful in many environments with limited access to care, including rural areas, emergency rooms, natural disasters and crisis zones, and warfronts. This technology delivers mental health care in areas that would otherwise not have any mental health care resources. Much of the time, this use involves live interfacing between patient and care giver, whether in video conference or over text thread. In addition, use of asynchronous telepsychiatry, in which a detailed interview with the patient is video taped and reviewed by a provider afterwards, has also proven an effective use of telepsychiatry. Telepsychiatry improves integrated and patient-centered care, allowing for the incorporation of mental health resources into the overall treatment of the patient.

In addition to direct patient care, telenursing and telepsychiatry, the use of technology in mental health has made a significant impact on crisis intervention and suicide prevention. Organizations such as Crisis Text Line have incorporated text chatting into crisis therapy, and have opened up a new line of resources available to people in mental health crises. This is especially significant for adolescent mental health, as many teens are more likely to utilize text message for therapy than in-person or over the phone.

=== Coronavirus pandemic ===
On March 27, 2020, legislation was passed in the United States to assist in the growth of Telehealth capabilities across the country. The CDC recommends that telehealth be used whenever possible to stop the spread of Corona Virus. Although Telehealth is not a new concept, the appearance of the Corona Virus and COVID-19 has quickly accelerated both its necessity and popularity. With societal changes occurring all across the globe, it became apparent that the medical field needed to devise a new way of delivering care in order to promote social distancing, quarantining when required, and the preservation of limited hospital resources. State-wide lockdowns were implemented to decrease the spread of the novel Corona Virus and Telehealth was and continues to be a way to make healthcare more accessible to people all around the country, especially in rural regions of America. Telehealth makes it possible for high-risk patients to remain safely in their homes while still receiving routine care from their providers. It allows Corona Virus positive providers with mild symptoms to be able to continue to see patients from home while they convalesce. The benefits of Telehealth during a pandemic appear to outweigh the risks: it will decrease overhead costs, is convenient, promotes infection control, connects medical personal from different regions, and allows for rapid triage. Risk factors include increasing health care disparity due to lack of internet or devices, technical difficulties, and a lack of hands on care. However, research indicates that telehealth will continue to play a vital role in diagnosis and treatment until proper effective treatment and/or a vaccine is available to the public. Hospital systems must access their readiness for telehealth and implement it in a timely fashion.

Since the rise of the coronavirus pandemic in the United States, telemedicine has risen exponentially, with estimates that telemedicine market size will be around $175 billion up from $45 billion in 2019. Reasons for the increase in telemedicine are numerous, however, reasons include reducing the exposure of staff to ill individuals and reducing overcrowding the healthcare facilities. Thus, telehealth has significantly grown during the pandemic as it increases social distancing by reducing the need for patient travel and going to crowded places. Another benefit of telehealth is it reduces the amount of PPE that is needed for healthcare professionals that are already in limited supply. Ultimately, telehealth has many benefits beyond the pandemic, such as increasing the number of people who seek preventative care since they can do so from home.

== Legal, ethical and regulatory issues ==
Telenursing is fraught with legal, ethical and regulatory issues, as it happens with telehealth as a whole. In many countries, interstate and intercountry practice of telenursing is forbidden (the attending nurse must have a license both in their state/country of residence and in the state/country where the patient receiving telecare is located). The Nurse Licensure Compact helps resolve some of these jurisdiction issues. Legal issues such as accountability and malpractice, etc. are also still largely unsolved and difficult to address. Ethical issues include maintaining autonomy, maintaining a patient's integrity as well as preventing harm to a patient.

Telenursing professionals use an electronic medical record (EMR) when storing and charting patient data. Digital clinical data transmission increases the risk that outside sources may intercept and exploit sensitive patient information. As a result, telehealth nurses should audit their current security measures and assess how their patient privacy and protection policies protect their patients. Most telehealth nurses work for a hospital or organization that provides them with a laptop and a very high level of security and encryption so that hackers and outside sources may not intercept patients' sensitive and personal information. Telehealth nursing aims to improve access to care, but practitioners and patients alike have concerns about security breaches, according to a report published by the National Center for Biotechnology (NCBI) stating that security is critical for long-term telemedicine success.

Currently, the Health Insurance Portability and Accounting Act (HIPAA) outlines rule sand regulations on how healthcare providers store and share patients' personal data. HIPAA requires that patients identifiable information be encrypted so that only the healthcare professionals involved in their care can access it. However, HIPAA only applies to certain "entities" that included healthcare providers and insurers but not the patients.

In addition, there are many considerations related to the patient confidentiality and the safety of clinical data.
