= Ambulatory care nursing =

Ambulatory care nursing is the nursing care of patients who receive treatment on an outpatient basis, ie they do not require admission to a hospital for an overnight stay. Ambulatory care includes those clinical, organizational and professional activities engaged in by registered nurses with and for individuals, groups, and populations who seek assistance with improving health and/or seek care for health-related problems. The American Academy of Ambulatory Care Nursing (AAACN) describes ambulatory care nursing as a comprehensive practice which is built on a broad knowledge base of nursing and health sciences, and applies clinical expertise rooted in the nursing process.

Ambulatory care nurses use evidence based information across a variety of outpatient health care settings to achieve and ensure patient safety and quality of care while improving patient outcomes. Contact with patients in ambulatory care is often relatively brief, and in the context of a high volume of patients. Nurses in this setting require sound assessment skills and the ability to guide patients in making informed health choices. Quality ambulatory care nursing has been associated with fewer emergency department visits, hospital visits and readmissions.

== Defining characteristics ==
- Ambulatory nursing care requires critical reasoning and astute clinical judgment in order to expedite appropriate care and treatment, especially given that the patient may present with complex problems or potentially life threatening conditions.
- Ambulatory care registered nurses provide care across the life span to individuals, families, caregivers, groups, populations, and communities.
- Ambulatory care nursing occurs across the continuum of care in a variety of settings, which include but are not limited to hospital-based clinic/centers, solo or group medical practices, ambulatory surgery & diagnostic procedure centers, telehealth service environments, university and community hospital clinics, military and veterans administration settings, nurse-managed clinics, managed care organizations, colleges and educational institutions, free standing community facilities, care coordination organizations, and patient homes.
- Ambulatory care registered nurses interact with patients during face-to-face encounters or through a variety of telecommunication strategies, often establishing long term relationships.
- Telehealth nursing is an integral component of professional ambulatory care nursing that utilizes a variety of telecommunications' technologies during encounters to assess, triage, provide nursing consultation, and perform follow up and surveillance of patients' status and outcomes.
- During each encounter, the ambulatory care registered nurse focuses on patient safety and the quality of nursing care by applying appropriate nursing interventions, such as identifying and clarifying patient needs, performing procedures, conducting health education, promoting patient advocacy, coordinating nursing and other health services, assisting the patient to navigate the health care system, and evaluating patient outcomes.
- Nurse/patient encounters can occur once or as a series of occurrences, are usually less than 24 hours in length at any one time, and occur singly or in-group settings.
- Ambulatory care registered nurses, acting as partners and advisers, assist and support patients and families to optimally manage their health care, respecting their culture and values, individual needs, health goals and treatment preferences.
- Ambulatory care registered nurses facilitate continuity of care using the nursing process, multidisciplinary collaboration, and coordination of appropriate health care services and community resources across the care continuum.
- Ambulatory care registered nurses are knowledgeable about and provide leadership in the clinical and managerial operations of the organization.
- Ambulatory care registered nurses design, administer, and evaluate nursing services within the organization in accord with relevant federal requirements, state laws and nurse practice acts, regulatory standards, and institutional policies and procedures.
- Ambulatory care registered nurses provide operational accountability for and coordination of nursing services, including the appropriate skill mix and delegation of roles and responsibilities for licensed and unlicensed nursing personnel.
- Ambulatory care registered nurses apply the provisions of the American Nurses Association Code of Ethics for Nurses to their own professional obligations and for the patients entrusted to their care.
- Ambulatory care registered nurses pursue lifelong learning that updates and expands their clinical, organizational, and professional roles and responsibilities.
- Ambulatory care registered nurses in the emergency care setting are increasingly called upon to implement evidence based practices (EBP), such as filling empty E.D. beds with unregistered and not-yet-triaged patients to increase the efficiency of patient throughput, decrease the 'left without being seen' rate, and decrease the 'door to physician' time.
- Ambulatory care registered nurses roles have expanded with team-based care. Team RNs work with specific teams of providers to assist with their patients' clinical and health educational needs at office visits and as needed by phone. RN care managers focus on the sicker patients on all providers' patient panels and make regular contact with them at and in between office visits to check on their status and assist as needed with managing their chronic illnesses.

== See also ==
- Ambulatory as a medical term
