= Nursing =

Health care profession

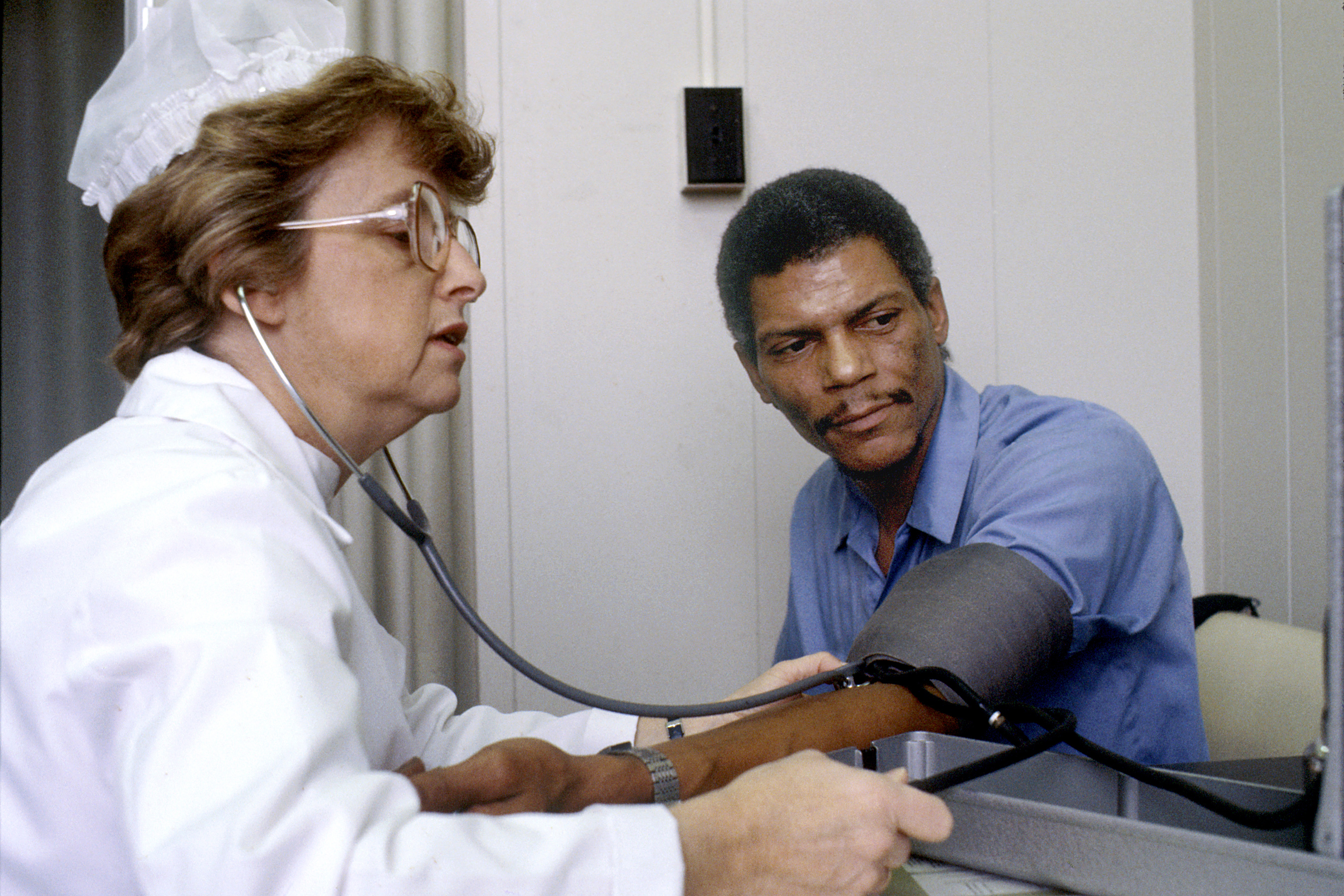
- A nurse checks a patient's blood pressure.

Occupation
- Activity sectors: Nursing

Description
- Competencies: Caring for general and specialized well-being of patients
- Education required: Qualifications in terms of statutory regulations according to national, state, or provincial legislation in each country
- Fields of employment: Hospital; Clinic; Laboratory; Research; Education; Home care
- Related jobs: Medicine; Glossary of medicine

Nursing is a health care profession that "integrates the art and science of caring and focuses on the protection, promotion, and optimization of health and human functioning; prevention of illness and injury; facilitation of healing; and alleviation of suffering through compassionate presence".

Nurses practice in many specialties with varying levels of certification and responsibility. Nurses comprise the largest component of most healthcare environments. There are imbalances between the supply and demand for qualified nurses in many countries.

Nurses develop a plan of care, working collaboratively with physicians and physician assistants, therapists, patients, families of patients, and other team members that focuses on treating illness to improve quality of life.

In the United Kingdom and the United States, clinical nurse specialists and nurse practitioners diagnose health problems and prescribe medications and other therapies, depending on regulations that vary by state. Nurses may help coordinate care performed by other providers or act independently as nursing professionals. In addition to providing care and support, nurses educate the public and promote health and wellness.

In the U.S., nurse practitioners are nurses with a graduate degree in advanced practice nursing, and are permitted to prescribe medications. They practice independently in a variety of settings in more than half of the United States. In the postwar period, nurse education has diversified, awarding advanced and specialized credentials, and many traditional regulations and roles are changing.

== History ==
=== Premodern ===
Nursing historians face challenges of determining whether care provided to the sick or injured in antiquity is called nursing care. In the fifth century BC, for example, the Hippocratic Collection in places described skilled care and observation of patients by male "attendants", who may have provided care now provided by nurses. Around 600 BC in India, it is recorded in Sushruta Samhita, Book 3, Chapter V about the role of the nurse as "the different parts or members of the body as mentioned before including the skin, cannot be correctly described by one who is not well versed in anatomy. Hence, anyone desirous of acquiring a thorough knowledge of anatomy should prepare a dead body and carefully, observe, by dissecting it, and examining its different parts."

In the Middle Ages, members of religious orders such as nuns and monks often provided nursing-like care. Examples exist in Christian, Islamic, Buddhist, and other traditions. The biblical figure of Phoebe is described in many sources as "the first visiting nurse". These traditions were influential in the development of the ethos of modern nursing. Its religious roots remain in evidence in many countries. One example in the United Kingdom is the use of the historical title "sister" to refer to a senior nurse.

During the Reformation, Protestant reformers shut down monasteries and convents, allowing a few hundred municipal hospices to remain in operation in northern Europe. Nuns who had been serving as nurses were given pensions or told to marry and stay home. Nursing care went to the inexperienced as traditional caretakers, rooted in the Roman Catholic Church, were removed from their positions. The nursing profession in Europe was extinguished for approximately 200 years.

=== 19th century ===
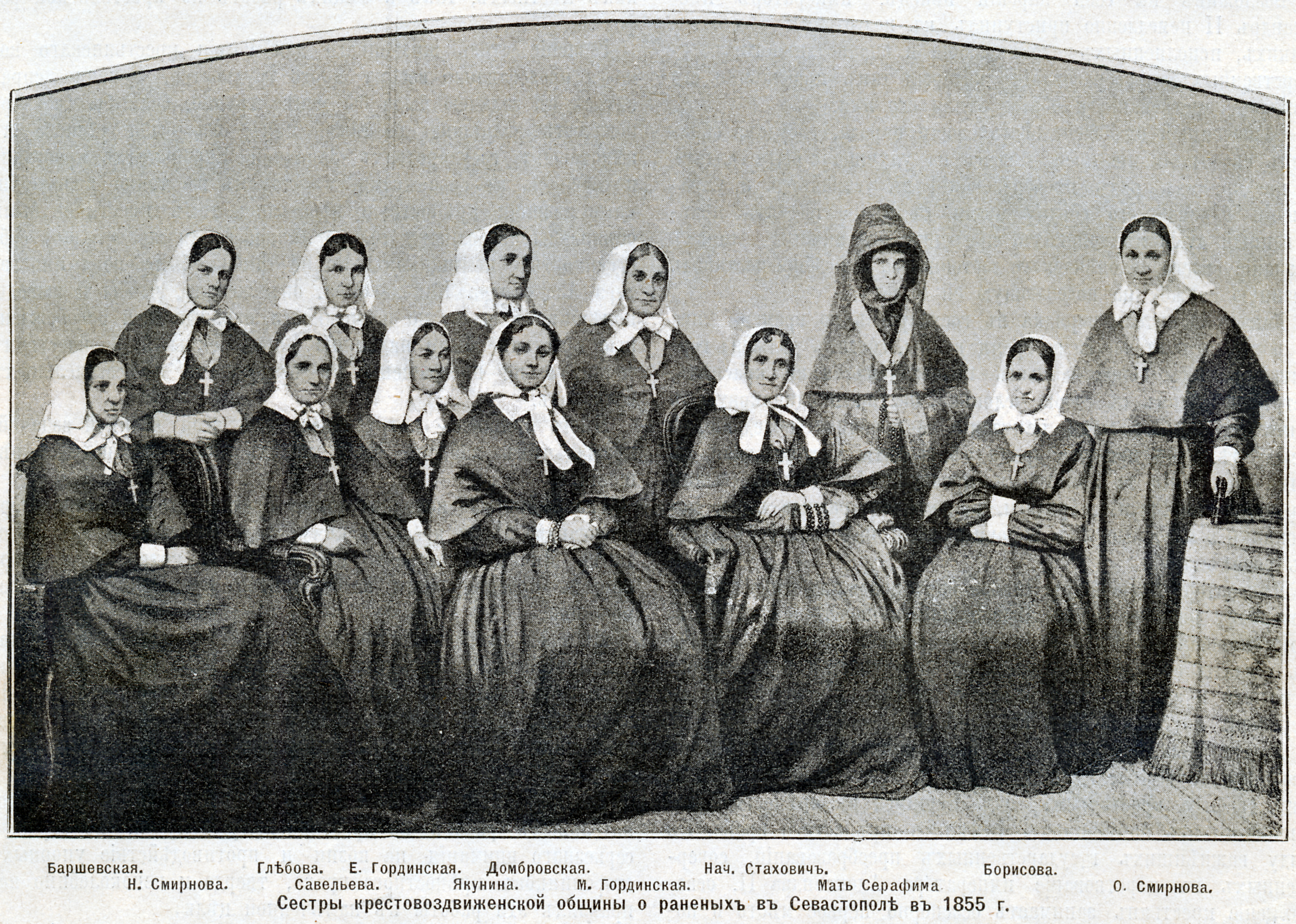
Russian Sisters of Mercy in the Crimea, 1854–1855

During the Crimean War, Grand Duchess Elena Pavlovna called for women to join the Order of Exaltation of the Cross (Krestodvizhenskaya Obshchina) for a year of service in military hospitals. The first section of twenty-eight "sisters", headed by Aleksandra Petrovna Stakhovich, the Directress of the Order, reached Crimea early in November 1854.

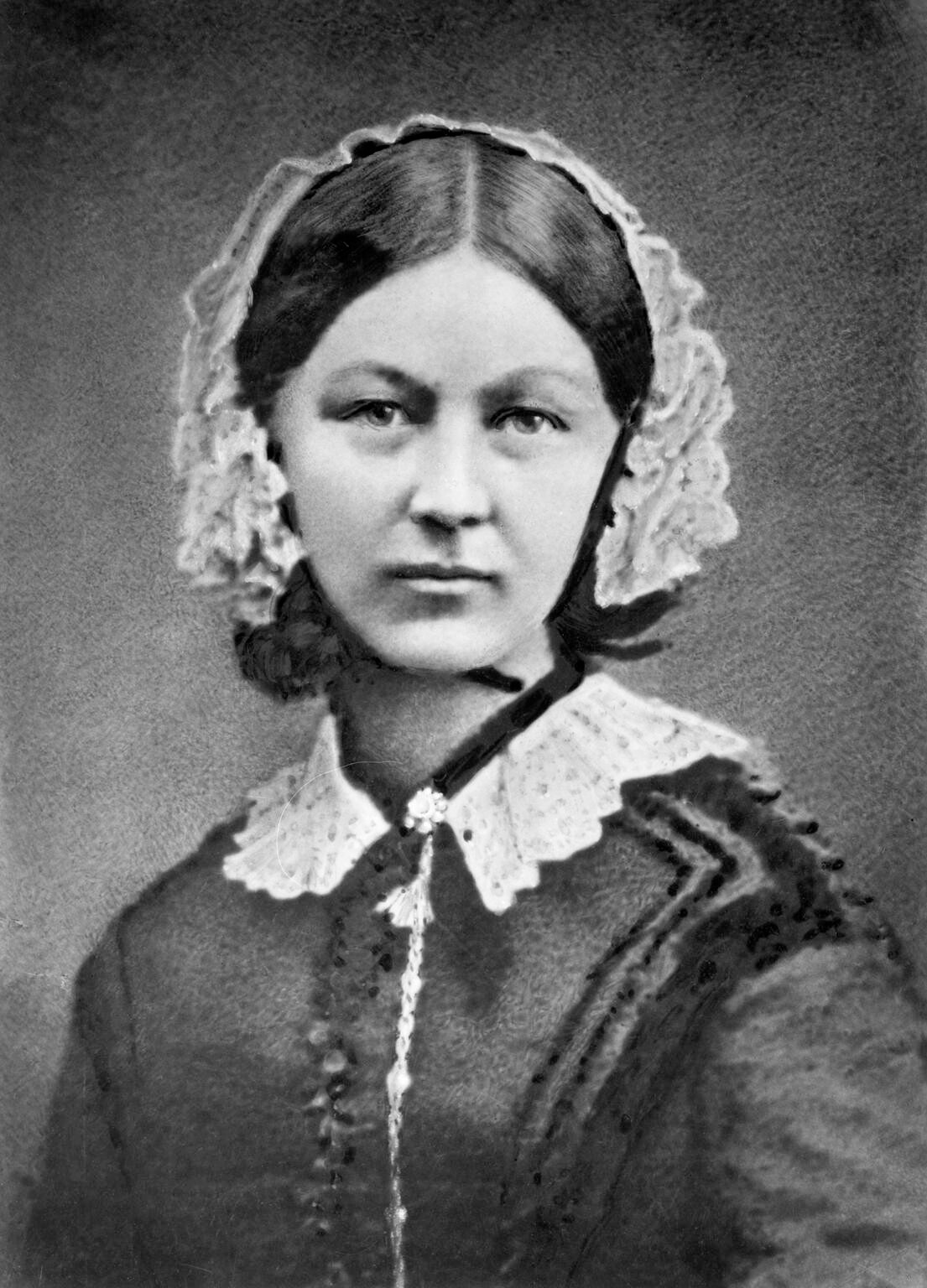
Florence Nightingale was an influential figure in the development of modern nursing. No uniform had been created when Nightingale was employed during the Crimean War. Often considered the first nurse theorist, Nightingale linked health with five environmental factors: (1) pure or fresh air, (2) pure water, (3) efficient drainage, (4) cleanliness, and (5) light, especially direct sunlight. Deficiencies in these five factors resulted in a lack of health or illness. Both the role of nursing and education were first defined by Nightingale.

Florence Nightingale laid the foundations of professional nursing after the Crimean War, in light of a comprehensive statistical study she made of sanitation in India, leading her to emphasize the importance of sanitation. "After 10 years of sanitary reform, in 1873, Nightingale reported that mortality among the soldiers in India had declined from 69 to 18 per 1,000".

Nightingale believed that nursing was a social freedom and mission for women. She believed that any educated woman could help improve the care of the ill. Her Notes on Nursing (1859) was a popular call to action. The Nightingale model of nursing education led to one of the first schools of nursing to be connected to a hospital and medical school. It spread widely in Europe and North America after 1870.

Nightingale included five factors that helped nurses in her time who worked amidst poor sanitation and little education. These factors include fresh air, clean water, a working drainage system, cleanliness, and good light. Nightingale believed that a clean working environment was important in caring for patients. In the 19th century, this theory was ideal for helping patients, providing a guide for nurses to alter the environment around patients for the betterment of their health.

Nightingale's recommendations built upon the successes of Jamaican "doctresses" such as Mary Seacole, who like Nightingale, served in the Crimean War. Seacole practised hygiene and the use of herbs in healing wounded soldiers and those suffering from diseases in the 19th century in the Crimea, Central America, and Jamaica. Her predecessors had great success as healers in the Colony of Jamaica in the 18th century, and they included Seacole's mother (Mrs. Grant), Sarah Adams, Cubah Cornwallis, and Grace Donne, the mistress and doctress to Jamaica's wealthiest planter, Simon Taylor.

Other important nurses in the development of the profession include:

- Agnes Hunt from Shropshire was the first orthopedic nurse and was pivotal in the emergence of the orthopedic hospital, the Robert Jones & Agnes Hunt Hospital in Oswestry, Shropshire.
- Valérie de Gasparin opened, with her husband Agénor de Gasparin, the world's first nursing school: La Source, in Lausanne, Switzerland.
- Agnes Jones established a nurse training regime at Brownlow Hill infirmary, Liverpool, in 1865.
- Linda Richards established nursing schools in the United States and Japan, and was officially the first professionally trained nurse in the US, graduating in 1873 from the New England Hospital for Women and Children in Boston.
- Clarissa Harlowe "Clara" Barton was a pioneer American teacher, patent clerk, nurse, and humanitarian, and the founder of the American Red Cross.
- Saint Marianne Cope was a Sister of St. Francis who opened and operated some of the first general hospitals in the United States, instituting cleanliness standards that influenced the development of America's hospital system.

Red Cross chapters, which began appearing after the establishment of the International Committee of the Red Cross in 1863, offered employment and professionalization opportunities for nurses (despite Nightingale's initial objections). Catholic orders such as Little Sisters of the Poor, Sisters of Mercy, Sisters of St. Mary, St. Francis Health Services, Inc. and Sisters of Charity built hospitals and provided nursing services during this period. The modern deaconess movement began in Germany in 1836. Within a half century, over 5,000 deaconesses had surfaced in Europe.

Formal use of nurses in the military began in the latter half of the nineteenth century. Nurses saw active duty in the First Boer War, the Egyptian Campaign (1882), and the Sudan Campaign (1883).

=== 20th century ===
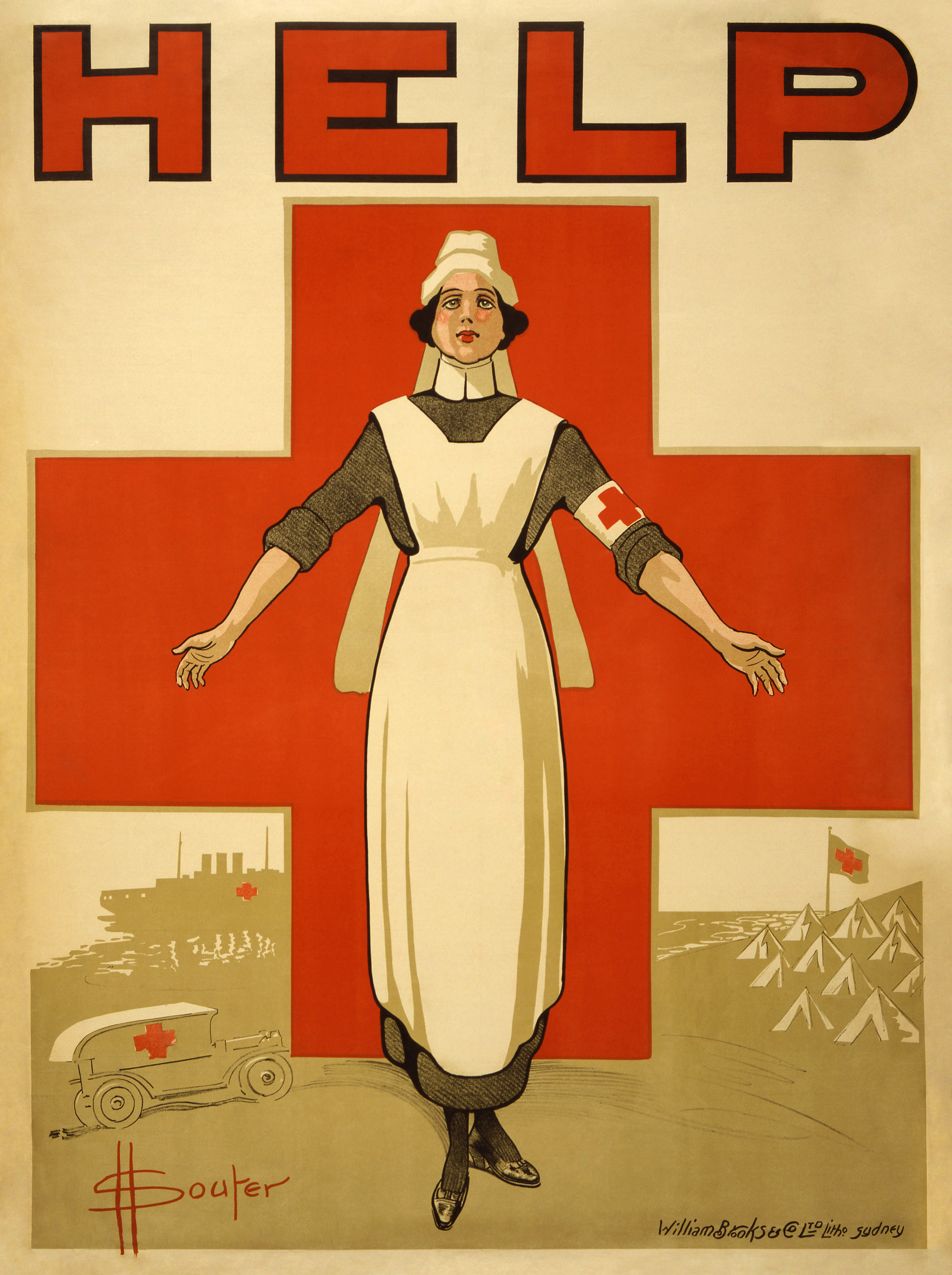
A recruiting poster for Australian nurses from the First World War.

In the 19th and early 20th century, nursing was considered a woman's profession, just as doctoring was a profession for men. With increasing expectations of workplace equality during the late 20th century, nursing became an officially gender-neutral profession, though in practice the percentage of male nurses remained well below that of female physicians in the 21st century.

Hospital-based training became standard in the US in the early 1900s, with an emphasis on practical experience. The Nightingale-style school began to disappear. Hospitals and physicians saw women in nursing as a source of free/inexpensive labor. Exploitation of nurses was not uncommon by employers, physicians, and education providers.

Many nurses saw active duty in the First World War, but the profession transformed again during the Second World War. British nurses of the Army Nursing Service were part of every overseas campaign. More nurses volunteered for service in the US Army and Navy than any other occupation. The Nazis had their own Brown Nurses, numbering 40,000. Two dozen German Red Cross nurses were awarded the Iron Cross for heroism under fire.

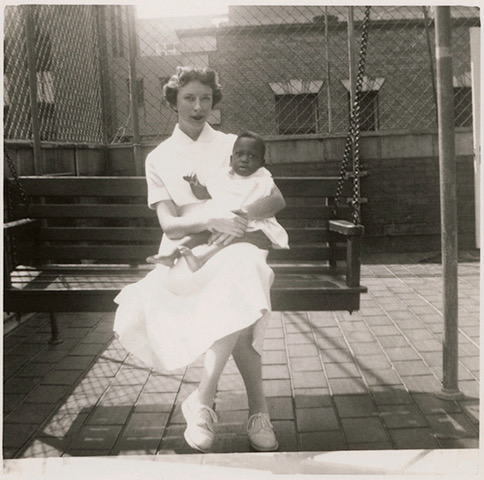
Registered nurse at Jefferson Medical College Hospital 1952

The development of undergraduate and post-graduate nursing degrees came after the war. Nursing research and a desire for association and organization led to the formation of professional organizations and academic journals. Nursing became recognized as a distinct academic discipline, initially tasked to define the theoretical basis for practice.

== Supply and demand ==
Supply and demand curves with equilibrium

Nurses are perceived to be in higher demand than supply around the world, particularly in South East Asia and Africa. A global survey by McKinsey & Company in 2022 found that between 28% and 38% of nurse respondents in the United States, the United Kingdom, Singapore, Japan, and France said they were likely to leave their role in direct patient care in the next year. The top five factors which they said would make them stay were:

- Safe working environment
- Work-life balance
- Caring and trusting team-mates
- Meaningful work
- Flexible work schedule

Pay ranked eighth on the list. A 2023 American survey found that around 30% were considering leaving patient care.

== Definition ==
According to the traditional interpretation physicians are concerned with curing or treating medical conditions, while nurses focus on care. In healthcare settings this line is often blurred, complicating the task of distinguishing the professions. Although nursing practice varies both through its various specialties and countries, nursing organizations offer the following definitions:

Nursing encompasses autonomous and collaborative care of individuals of all ages, families, groups and communities, sick or well, and in all settings. Nursing includes the promotion of health, prevention of illness, and the care of ill, disabled and dying people. Advocacy, promotion of a safe environment, research, participation in shaping health policy and in patient and health systems management, and education are also key nursing roles.

— International Council of Nurses

The use of clinical judgment in the provision of care to enable people to improve, maintain, or recover health, to cope with health problems, and to achieve the best possible quality of life, whatever their disease or disability, until death.

— Royal College of Nursing (2003)

Nursing is the protection, promotion, and optimization of health and abilities; prevention of illness and injury; alleviation of suffering through the diagnosis and treatment of human responses; and advocacy in health care for individuals, families, communities, and populations.

— American Nurses Association

The unique function of the nurse is to assist the individual, sick or well, in the performance of those activities contributing to health or its recovery (or to peaceful death) that he would perform unaided if he had the necessary strength, will or knowledge.

— Virginia Avenel Henderson

== Professional nursing ==
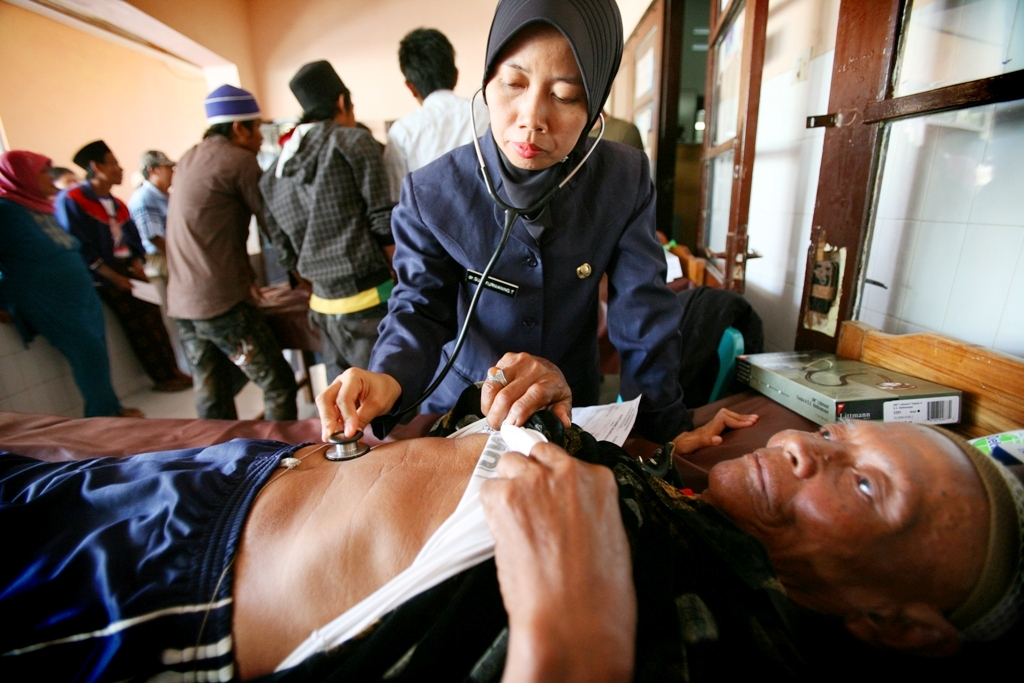
A nurse in Indonesia examining a patient

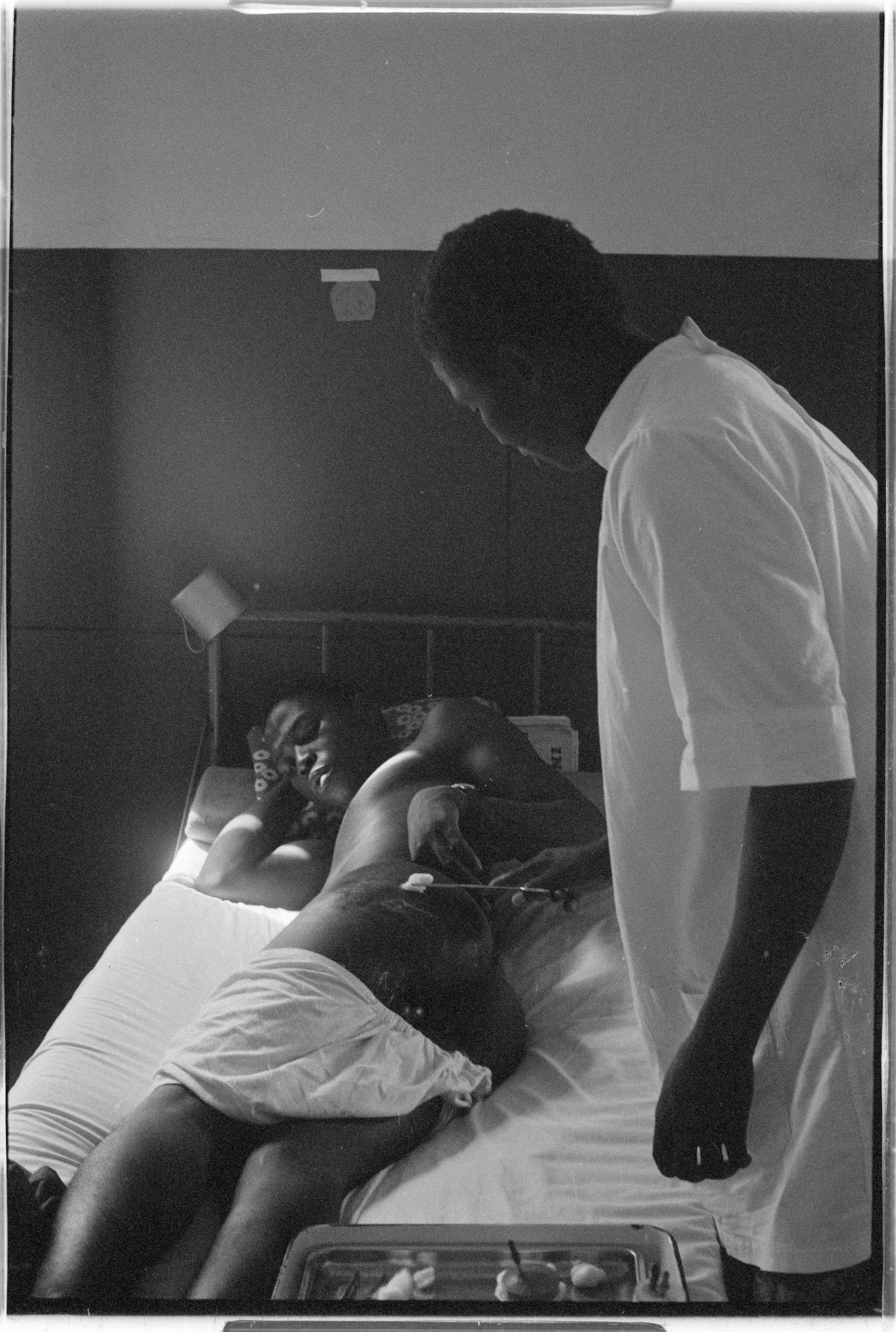
A nurse treating a patient with burns, Ziguinchor PAIGC hospital, 1973

A nursing student demonstrate dieting in Bankura Sammilani Medical College and Hospital, India

The practice of nursing is based upon a social contract that delineates professional rights and responsibilities as well as accountability mechanisms. In almost all countries, nursing practice is defined and governed by law, and entrance to the profession is regulated at the national or state level.

The nursing community worldwide aims for professional nurses to ensure quality care, while maintaining their credentials, code of ethics, standards, and competencies, and continuing their education. Multiple educational paths lead to becoming a professional nurse; these vary by jurisdiction; all involve extensive study of nursing theory and practice as well as training in clinical skills.

Nurses provide care based on the individual's physical, emotional, psychological, intellectual, social, and spiritual needs. The profession combines physical science, social science, nursing theory, and technology.

Nurses typically hold one or more formal credentials. Roles and responsibilities follow the level of education. For example, in the United States, Licensed Practical Nurses (LPN) have less education than Registered Nurses (RN) and accordingly, a narrower scope of practice.

=== Diversity ===
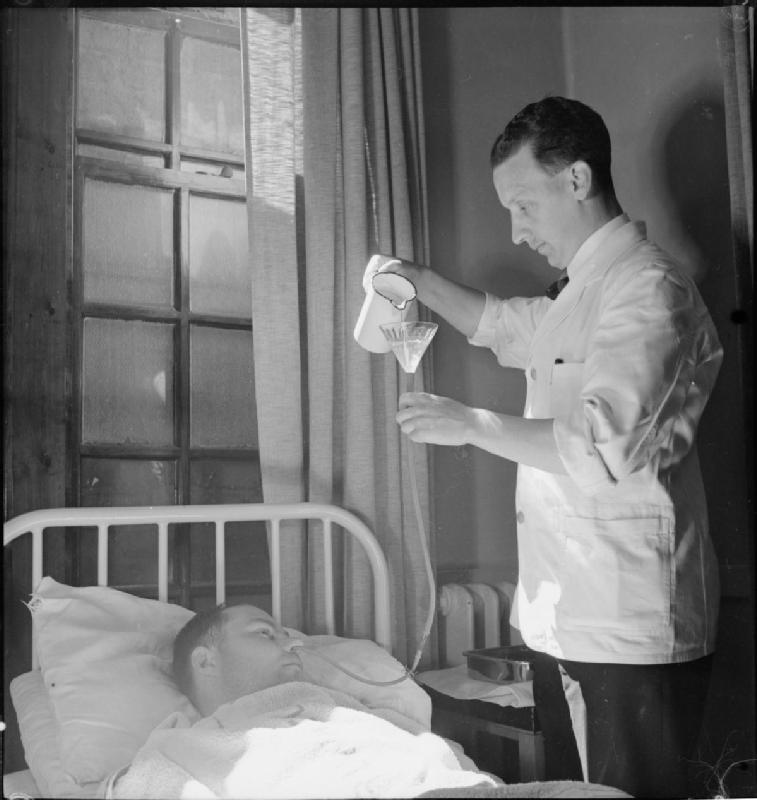
A male nurse at Runwell Hospital, Wickford, Essex, in 1943

Nursing is a female-dominated profession in many countries; according to the WHO's 2020 State of the World's Nursing, approximately 90% of the nursing workforce is female. For instance, the male-to-female ratio of nurses is approximately 1:19 in Canada and the United States. This ratio is matched in many other countries. Notable exceptions include Francophone Africa, which includes the countries of Benin, Burkina Faso, Cameroon, Chad, Congo, Côte d'Ivoire, the Democratic Republic of Congo, Djibouti, Guinea, Gabon, Mali, Mauritania, Niger, Rwanda, Senegal, and Togo, which all have more male than female nurses. In Europe, in countries such as Spain, Portugal, Czech Republic and Italy, over 20% of nurses are male. As of 2016, 11% of nurses and midwives registered with the Nursing and Midwifery Council (NMC) in the UK were male. The number of male nurses in the United States doubled between 1980 and 2000. On average, male nurses in the US receive more pay than female nurses.

== Theory and process ==
Nursing practice is the actual provision of nursing care. In providing care, nurses implement a nursing care plan defined using the nursing process. This is based around a specific nursing theory that is selected based on the care setting and the population served. In providing nursing care, the nurse uses both nursing theory and best practice derived from nursing research. Many nursing theories are in use. Like other disciplines, the profession has developed multiple theories derived from reflecting varying philosophical beliefs and paradigms or worldviews.

In general terms, the nursing process is the method used to assess and diagnose needs, plan outcomes and interventions, implement interventions, and evaluate outcomes. The nursing process as defined by the American Nurses Association comprises five steps: 1) evaluate, 2) implement, 3) plan, 4) diagnose, and 5) assess.

== Healthcare staffing platforms ==
Digital health platforms connect nurses and nurse assistants with job openings in healthcare facilities such as skilled nursing homes, home health agencies, and hospitals. Platforms offer an app to facilitate communication and allow nurses to find work opportunities based on their preferences. Healthcare partners and facilities benefit from access to qualified nurses. In 2017, the UK's National Health Service began trialing such a platform.

Platforms such as United States–based ConnectRN, Nomad Health, Gale Healthcare solutions or Lantum add resources, career development tools, and networking opportunities.

== Nursing as a science ==
Florence Nightingale's seminal epidemiological study examining mortality among British soldiers during the Crimean War was published in 1858. With the exception of her works, nursing practice remained an oral tradition until the mid-20th century. The inaugural issue of Nursing Research, the first scientific journal specialized in nursing, came in in 1952. During the 1960s, interest in attaining PhDs increased among nurses in the US, but nursing remained a fledgling area of research, with few journals until the 1970s. Nursing research is increasingly presented as a valid discipline, although lacking a prevailing definition. The question is further complicated by the numerous interpretations of nursing's defining essence.

=== Evidence-based practice ===
During the 1980s there was an increased focus on research utilization (RU). Nursing research took an interest in clinical issues and US nursing schools began teaching research methods to facilitate interpretation and integration of scientific findings in routine practice. Several RU initiatives were active during the late 20th century, but the RU movement was superseded by evidence-based practice in the 1990s. Evidence-based practice (EBP) is about using research, but unlike RU it allows for the integration of research findings with clinical expertise and patient preferences. The EBP movement had originated in the field of medicine with Archie Cochrane publishing Effectiveness and Efficiency in 1972, leading up to the founding of the Cochrane Collaboration in 1993. The emerging area of evidence-based medicine also applies to nursing. Common barriers to the study and integration of research findings into clinical decision making include: a lack of opportunity, inexperience, and the rapid pace of evidence accumulation.

== Scope of practice ==
Nurses perform a variety of different tasks. Their activities vary based on their level of training and their specialty. For example, operating room nurses work in surgical settings and perform tasks that other nurses do not. Nurses may receive additional training and certifications to perform a variety of tasks. For example, in the United States, RN first assists (RNFAs) perform some basic surgical procedures.

=== Assessment ===
Assessment is an essential nursing skill. Nurses assess patients' physical and mental health. In hospital settings, nurses regularly perform assessments to notice any acute changes in their patients. Nurses also assess a patient's response to medication or other treatments, such as physical activity and blood transfusions. Nurses may also take health histories. Nurses also must assess a patient's understanding of their health status and their medications. Critical thinking is an important skill for nurses to have. In emergency situations, nurses must quickly assess a patient and determine the best course of action.

=== Medication ===
Medication management and administration are common hospital nursing roles, although prescribing authority varies across jurisdictions. In many areas, RNs administer and manage medications prescribed by others. Nurses are responsible for evaluating patients throughout their care – including before and after medication administration – adjustments to medications are often made through a collaborative effort between the prescriber and the nurse. Regardless of the prescriber, nurses are legally responsible for the drugs they administer. Legal implications may accompany an error in a prescription, and the nurse may be expected to note and report the error. In the United States, nurses have the right to refuse to administer medication that they deem to be potentially harmful. Some nurses take additional training that allows them to prescribe medications within their scope of practice.

=== Patient education ===
Effective patient/family education leads to better outcomes. Nurses explain procedures, recovery, and ongoing care, while helping everyone cope with the medical situation.

Many times, nurses are busy, leaving little time to educate patients.

Patients' families needs similar education. Educating both patients and their families increases the chance for a better outcome.

Nurses have to communicate in a way that can be understood by patients. Education techniques encompass conversations, visuals, reading materials, and demonstrations.

=== Daily living assistance ===
Nurses manage and coordinate care to support activities of daily living (ADL) such as hygiene and toileting. This includes assisting in patient mobility, such as moving an activity intolerant patient within a bed. They often delegate such care to nursing assistants.

== Specialties ==
Nursing is the most diverse of all health care professions. Nurses practice in a wide range of settings, but generally follows the needs of their patients.

The major specialties are:

- communities/public health
- family/individual care
- adult-gerontology
- pediatrics
- obstetrics
- neonatal
- women's health/gender-related
- mental health
- informatics (eHealth)
- acute care
- ambulatory settings (physician offices, urgent care settings, camps, etc.)
- school/college/institutional infirmaries
- military
- cardiac care
- orthopedic care
- palliative care
- perioperative
- oncology
- telenursing
- radiology
- emergency care

Nurses with additional degrees allow for specialization. Nursing professions can be separated into categories by care type, age, gender, certain age group, practice setting, individually or in combination.

== Settings ==
Nurses practice in a wide range of settings, including hospitals, private homes, schools, and pharmaceutical companies. Nurses work in occupational health settings (also called industrial health settings), free-standing clinics, physician offices, nurse-led clinics, long-term care facilities and camps. They work on cruise ships, military bases, and in combat settings.

Nurses act as advisers and consultants to the health care and insurance industries. Many nurses also work in health advocacy and patient advocacy, helping in clinical and administrative domains. Some are attorneys and others work with attorneys as legal nurse consultants, reviewing patient records to assure that adequate care was provided and testifying in court.

Nurses can work on a temporary basis, which involves doing shifts without a contract in a variety of settings, sometimes known as per diem nursing, agency nursing or travel nursing. Nurses work as researchers in laboratories, universities, and research institutions. Nurses work in informatics, acting as consultants to the creation of computerized charting programs and other software. Nurse authors publish articles and books to provide essential reference materials.

== Occupational hazards ==
A video describing occupational hazards that exist among nurses

The international nursing shortage is in part due to their work environment. In a recent review of the literature specific to nursing performance, nurses were found to work in generally poor environmental conditions. Some jurisdictions have legislation specifying acceptable nurse-to-patient ratios.

The fast-paced and unpredictable nature of health care places nurses at risk for injuries and illnesses, including high occupational stress. Nurses consistently identify stress as a major work-related concern and have among the highest levels of occupational stress among all professions. This stress is caused by the environment, psychosocial stressors, and the demands of nursing, including mastering new technology, emotional labor, physical labor, shift work, and high workload. This stress puts nurses at risk for short-term and long-term health problems, including sleep disorders, depression, mortality, psychiatric disorders, stress-related illnesses, and overall poor health. Nurses are at risk of developing compassion fatigue and moral distress, which can damage mental health. They have high rates of occupational burnout (40%) and emotional exhaustion (43.2%). Burnout and exhaustion increase the risk for illness, medical error, and suboptimal care provision.

=== Patient handling ===
Healthcare has consistently ranked among the industries with the highest rates of musculoskeletal injuries, largely related to patient handling. Anywhere from 30 to 70% of reported musculoskeletal injuries are related to patient handling. Nurses are routinely tasked with lifting, repositioning, and mobilizing patients. According to the National Institute for Occupational Safety and Health (NIOSH) the single greatest factor in overexertion injuries is the manual lifting, moving and repositioning of patients. These tasks present unique ergonomic hazards that result in a high rate of acute and cumulative musculoskeletal injuries.

The most frequently injured body part is the back, with up to 72% of nurses reporting non-specific low back pain. The US Bureau of Labor Statistics reported that for 2021-2022 the rate of overexertion injuries leading to days away from work for nurses was 45.4 per 10,000 full time employees, while nursing aids came in at 145.5 compared to the average for all industries of 26.1.

Traditionally, nurses are trained in manual patient handling techniques. The body of evidence has demonstrated, however, that such interventions are ineffective.

=== Workplace violence ===
Nurses are at risk for workplace violence and abuse. Violence is typically perpetrated by non-staff (e.g. patients or family), whereas abuse is typically perpetrated by hospital personnel. In the US in 2011, 57% of nurses reported that they had been threatened at work; 17% were physically assaulted.

The three types of workplace violence that nurses can experience are: physical violence (hitting, kicking, beating, punching, biting, and using objects); psychological violence (threats or coercion); sexual violence (attempted/completed non-consensual sex act).

Workplace violence can be viewed in another way: interpersonal violence and organizational coercion. Interpersonal violence is committed by workers or patients and their families. Its predominant form is verbal abuse. Organizational coercion may include excessive workloads, mandatory shifts, involuntary placement in another part of the workplace, low salaries, denial of benefits/overtime, poor working environment, and other stressors. These issues affect quality of life. Managers who lack understanding of the severity of these problems and do not support workers increase worker stress.

Many factors contribute to workplace violence. These factors can be divided into environmental, organizational, and individual psychosocial. The environmental factors can include the specific setting (for example the emergency department), long patient wait times, frequent interruptions, uncertainty regarding patients' treatment, and heavy workloads. Organizational factors can include inefficient teamwork, organizational injustice, lack of aggression- and stress-management programs, and distrust between colleagues. Individual psychosocial factors may include nurses being young and inexperienced, previous experiences with violence, and a lack of communication skills. Misunderstandings may also occur due to the communication barrier between nurses and patients. An example of this could be patients' conditions being affected by medications, pain, or anxiety.

Workplace violence has many causes. The most common perpetrators of harassment or bullying of nursing students were registered nurses including preceptors, mentors, and clinical facilitators. However, the main perpetrators of workplace violence against nurses were patients. 80% of serious violent incidents in health care centers were committed by patients.

Workplace violence has many effects. It has negative emotional and physical impacts on nurses. They feel depersonalized, dehumanized, worn out, and stressed out. Nurses have reported burn-out due to frequent exposure to this violence.

=== Interventions ===
Interventions can mitigate these occupational hazards. They can be individual-focused or organization-focused. Individual-focused interventions include stress management programs, which can be customized to individuals. Stress management programs can reduce anxiety, sleep disorders, and other symptoms of stress. Organizational interventions focus on reducing stressful aspects of the work environment by identifying stress generators and developing solutions to them. Combining organizational and individual interventions is most effective at reducing stress. In some Japanese hospitals, powered exoskeletons are used to reduce physical loads. Lumbar supports (i.e. back belts) have been trialed.

== Nursing ethics ==
Professional abuse by nurses can be mitigated by nursing ethics and professional responsibility.

== By country ==
=== Africa ===
==== Kenya ====
Nursing in Kenya began in 1908 and was conducted without a formal framework until 1950. Over the decades, with demand for healthcare providers increasing due to marked growth in the population of Kenya, training programs were implemented.

==== South Africa ====
Nurses in South Africa practise in a wide variety of specialties, with a wide variety of training and experience.

=== Americas ===
==== United States ====
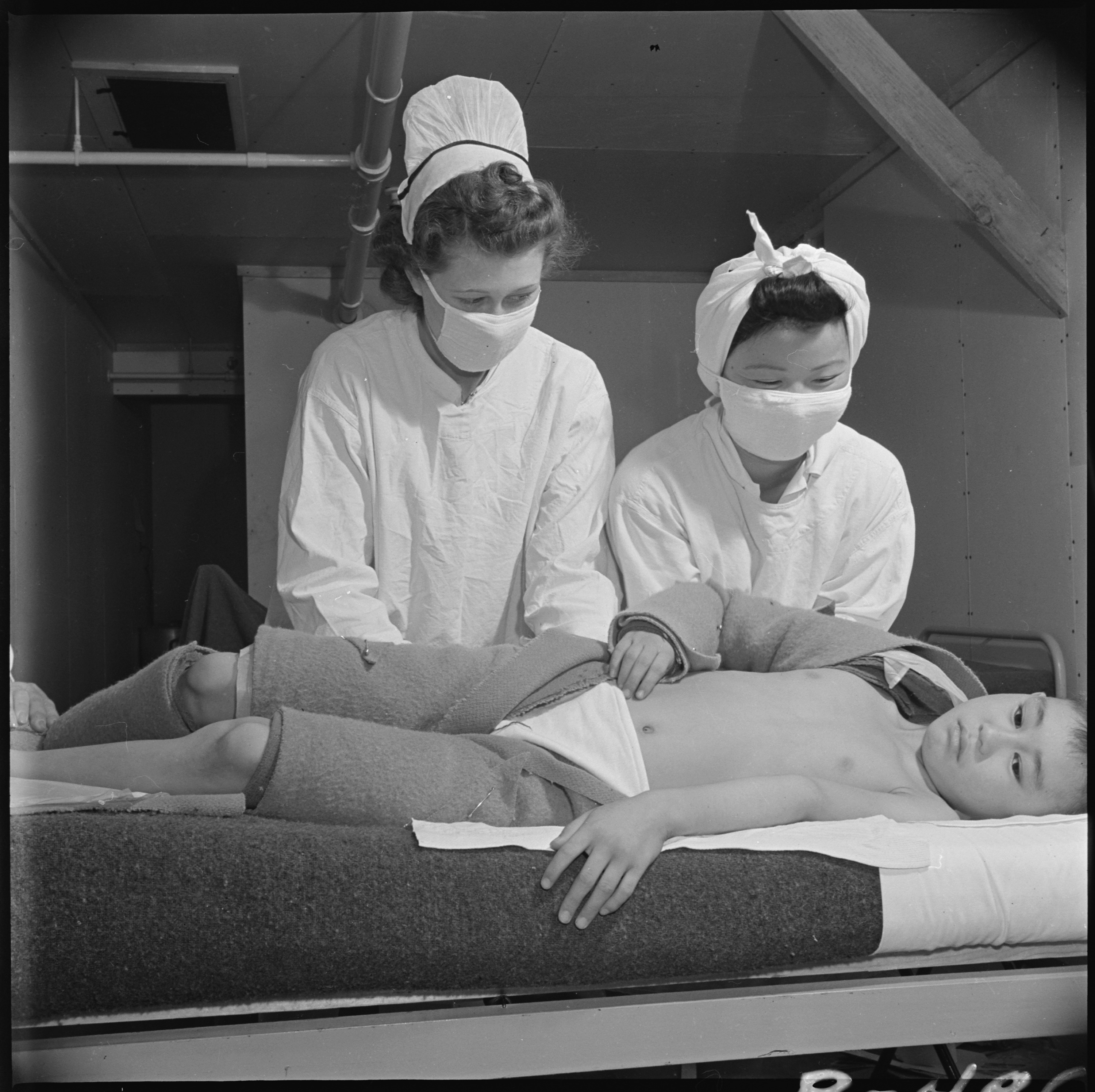
Two nurses in Arizona, 1943

Nursing in the United States is a professional health care occupation. It is the largest such occupation, employing millions of certified professionals. As of 2023, 3,175,390 registered nurses were employed, paid a median income of $86,070.

Nurses are not doctors' assistants and practice nursing in a wide variety of specialties and departments. They may act in that capacity, such as in the emergency department or in trauma care, but more often independently care for their patients or assist other nurses. RNs treat patients, record their medical history, provide emotional support, and provide follow-up care. Nurses also help doctors perform diagnostic tests.

Many nurses work in a hospital setting. Options there include: pediatrics, neonatal, maternity, OBGYN, geriatrics, orthopedics, medical-surgical, operating room, ambulatory, and nurse anesthetists and informatics (eHealth). Other options include community health, mental health, clinical nursing specialists, and nurse midwives.

==== Canada ====
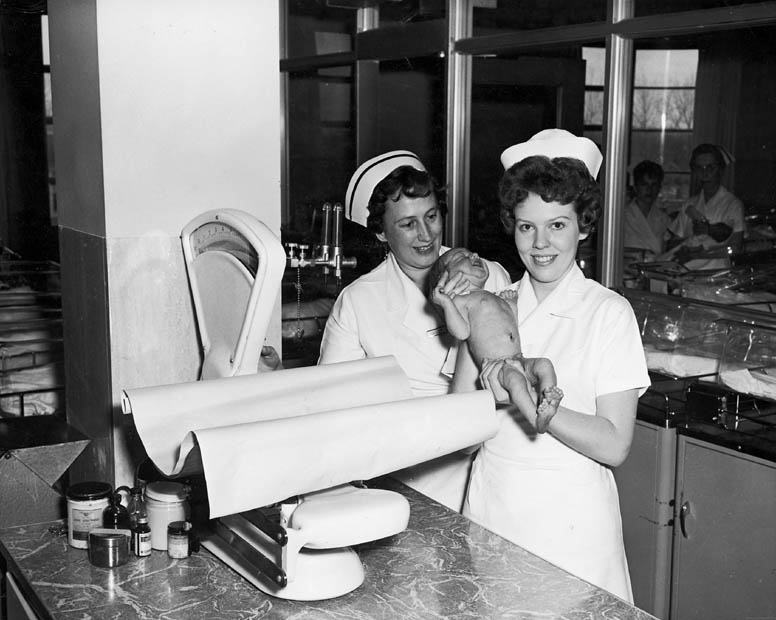
Two nurses with a baby in the nursery at Toronto East General and Orthopaedic Hospital, 1955

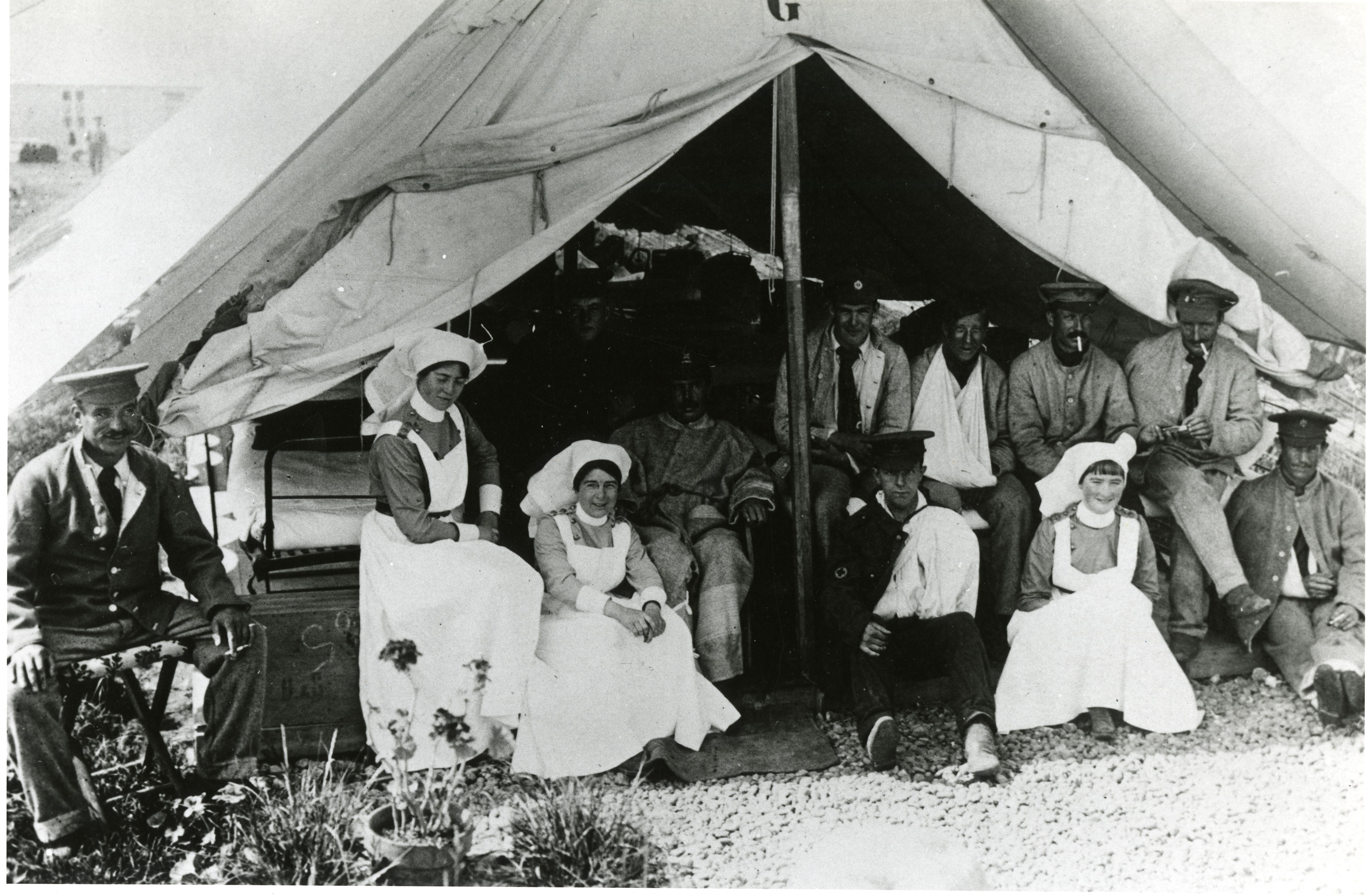
Canadian nurses with wounded soldiers

Nurses in Canada practise in a wide variety of settings, with various levels of training and experience. They provide evidence-based care and educate their patients about health and disease.

The role that nurses have played in the development of Canada has been recognized through the designation of seven National Historic Sites of Canada related to nursing. Five nurses' residences (the Ann Baillie Building, Begbie Hall, the Hersey Pavilion, the Pavillon Mailloux and the St. Boniface Hospital Nurses' Residence) were designated in commemoration of the growing professionalism of nursing and of the expanded role of nurses in health care over the course of the 20th century. The La Corne Nursing Station and the Wilberforce Red Cross Outpost were designated, in part, in honour of the role played by nurses in delivering health care to isolated areas.

Nurses in every setting demonstrate their commitment to continually improving their nursing practice by annually engaging in a written reflection, an analysis of the year, and 2 learning goals. Every nurse registered in the General or Extended class is required, under the Registered Health Professions Act, 1991, to participate in the Quality Assurance (QA) program.

==== Latin America/Caribbean ====
Latin American nursing is based on three levels of training: (a) professional/registered, (b) technical, and (c) auxiliary. Nursing education in Latin America and the Caribbean includes the principles and values of universal health and primary health care. These principles are based on critical and complex thinking development, problem-solving, evidence-based clinical decision-making, and lifelong learning.

=== Europe ===
==== European Union ====
In the European Union, the profession of nurse requires a specific professional qualification. The qualification of nurses responsible for general care in the EU is regulated in Directive 2005/36/EC. The list of regulated nursing professions is held in the regulated professions database.

===== Germany =====
Nursing in Germany is provided by different levels of professional and specialized practitioners. German-registered nurses are called Gesundheits- und Krankenpfleger (health- and sickness carer). Previously, the official name for a nurse practicing in Germany was Krankenschwester (female) and Krankenpfleger (male).

===== Spain =====
Nursing in Spain is regulated by the General Council of Official Associations of Nursing (Organización Colegial de Enfermería).

==== United Kingdom ====
Nursing in the United Kingdom is the profession of registered nurses and nursing associates in the primary and secondary care of patients. It has evolved from assisting doctors to encompass a variety of professional roles. More than 780,000 registered nurses practise in the UK, working in settings such as hospitals, health centres, nursing homes, hospices, communities, military, prisons, and academia. Many are employed by the National Health Service (NHS).

Nursing is split into four fields: adults, children, mental health, and learning disability. Within these nurses may work within specialties such as medical care or theatres, and may specialise further in areas such as cardiac care. Nurses often work in multi-disciplinary teams, but equally work independently, and may work in supporting sectors such as education or research.

The UK-wide regulator for nursing is the Nursing and Midwifery Council (NMC), and all nurses and nursing associates must be registered to practise. Dental Nurses, nursery nurses and veterinary nurses are not regulated by the NMC and follow different training, qualifications and career pathways.

=== Asia ===
==== India ====
Nursing in India is the practice of providing care for patients, families, and communities in that nation to improve health and quality of life.

=== Hong Kong ===
Nursing is a licensed professional occupation in Hong Kong. The profession is regulated by the Nursing Council of Hong Kong, a statutory body. Nurses in Hong Kong are divided into registered nurses and enrolled nurses, with the former requiring more extensive professional training.

There are a total of 59,082 nurses in Hong Kong as of 2019, with the majority of registered nurses working for the Hospital Authority. Nursing education is provided by universities, post-secondary colleges, and hospital-based nursing schools.

==== Japan ====
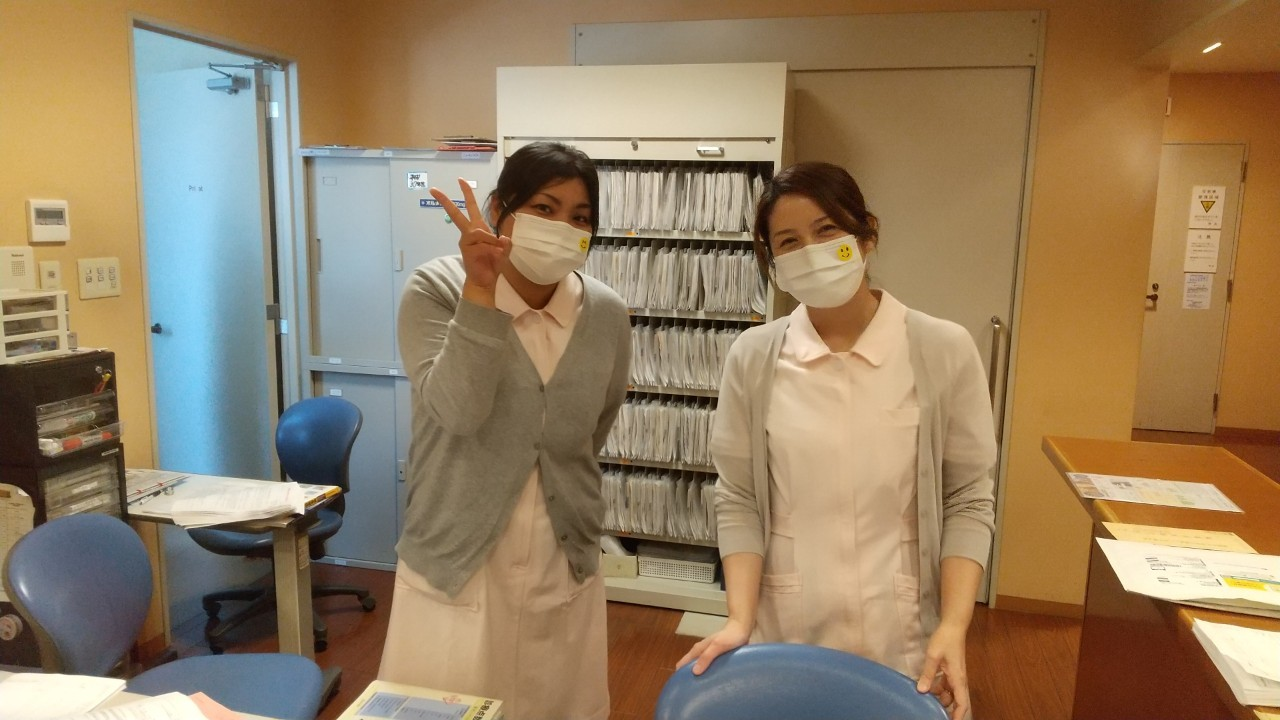
Japanese nurses

Nursing in Japan did not develop as an occupation until the end of the nineteenth century. Initially introduced only in Tokyo in the late 1860s, small schools utilizing Western models were being opened by the late 1880s. In response to disaster relief, the Japanese Red Cross became an integral part of nursing development. By 1915, nurse registration had been established and public health nurses began working throughout the country. Nursing universities were established in the twentieth century and regulations were passed to develop standards for training and public health. Presently, Japan recognizes four types of nurses: Public Health Nurses, Midwives, Registered Nurses and Assistant Nurses.

=== Pakistan ===
Nursing is a major component of Pakistan's health-care system. The topic has been the subject of extensive historical studies, is as of 2021 a major issue in the country, and has been the subject of much scholarly discussion amongst academics and practitioners. In 2009, Pakistan's government stated its intent to improve the country's nursing care.

Nursing is a health-care profession which is mainly aimed on the care of families and individuals. Nursing is important in every part of the world, especially in developing countries like Pakistan. In 2021, Pakistan faces a great shortage of trained nurses.

==== Philippines ====
Nursing in the Philippines is provided by professionally trained nurses, who also provide a quarter of the world's overseas nurses. Every year, some 20,000 nurses work in other countries. Nurses in the Philippines are licensed by the Professional Regulatory Commission. The advance of nursing in the Philippines as a career was pioneered by a culture of care that is intrinsic in the Filipino people. This began before Spanish colonization.

==== Taiwan ====
In Taiwan, the Ministry of Health and Welfare regulates nursing. The Taiwan Union of Nurses Association (TUNA) organizes nurses.

=== Australia ===
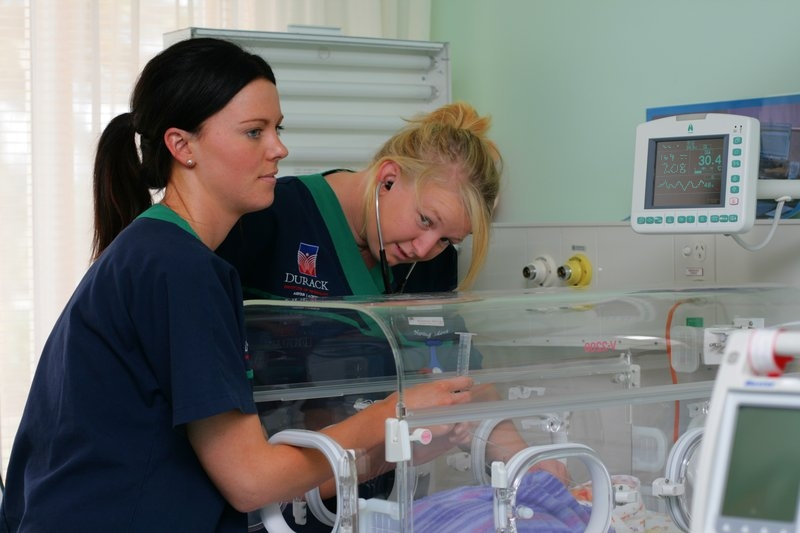
Two trainee nurses operating a neonatal incubator in 2011

Nursing in Australia is a healthcare profession. Nurses and midwives form the majority (54%) of Australian health care professionals. Nurses are either registered or enrolled. Registered nurses have broader and deeper education than enrolled nurses. Nurse practitioners complete a yet higher qualification. Nurses are not limited to working in hospitals, instead working in a variety of settings. Beyond hospitals, nurses also work in aged-care facilities, schools, and correctional services where they can apply their practice to aid those in need. Additionally, Australian nurses are in demand as traveling nurses, particularly those with advanced qualifications to work in remote regions where healthcare is scarce.

=== Middle East ===
==== Iran ====
Nursing educational programs in Iran are similar to the nursing educational programs in other countries in many aspects. Holding a secondary school diploma and passing the entrance exam is necessary for the admission. The entrance exams to governmental universities and Azad University are held separately. The duration of the associate degree course for operating room and anesthesia is two years, a bachelor's degree in nursing is four years, a master's degree in nursing is two to two and a half years, and a doctorate degree in nursing is four to five years.

=== Islam ===
In Islam, nurses provide healthcare services to patients, families and communities as a manifestation of love for Allah and Muhammad. The nursing profession is not new to Islam. Islamic traditions include sympathy for and responsibility toward those in need. This perspective had emerged during the development of Islam as a religion, culture, and civilization.

Historically, female nurses during the era of slavery in the Muslim world were often slaves, a tradition which continued in Saudi Arabia until the abolition of slavery in Saudi Arabia in 1962, where nursing was considered a dishonorable profession.

==== Israel ====
Nurses in Israel has responsibilities including hospital care, patient education, wound care, prenatal and other monitoring, midwifery, and well-baby clinics.

Nurses and midwives are regulated by the Israeli Ministry of Health.

Nursing in Israeli Jewish culture traces its origins to Shifra and Puah, two Hebrew midwives depicted in the Book of Exodus helping women in ancient Egypt give birth and keep their infants safe.

Modern-day nursing was established by nurses sent to Mandatory Palestine and later Israel by the Hadassah organization, as well as at a nursing school founded by Henrietta Szold in 1918. The United Kingdom regulated midwifery in Mandatory Palestine, but nurses were not mentioned in the regulation decree.

== See also ==
- Advanced practice registered nurse
- History of nursing
- History of Nursing in the United Kingdom
- History of nursing in the United States
- History of Philippine nurses in the United States
- Index of nursing articles
- Licensed practical nurse
- List of fictional nurses
- List of nurses
- List of nursing specialties
- Men in nursing
- Nightingale Pledge
- Nurse uniform
- Nurse–client relationship
- Nurse scheduling problem
- Nursing care plan
- Nursing school
- Nurse stereotypes
- Nursing theory
- Registered nurse
- Transcultural nursing
