= Nursing credentials and certifications =

Necessities for practicing nursing legally

Nursing credentials and certifications are the various credentials and certifications that a person must have to practice nursing legally. Nurses' postnominal letters (abbreviations listed after the name) reflect their credentials—that is, their achievements in nursing education, licensure, certification, and fellowship. The letters usually appear in the following order:

- Highest earned academic degree in or related to nursing (e.g. "DNP" or "PhD")
- Nursing licensure (e.g. "APRN," "RN," "LPN")
- Nursing certification (e.g. "CCRN")
- Nursing fellowship (e.g. "FAAN")

Generally, credentials are listed from most to least permanent. A degree, once earned, cannot, in normal circumstances, be taken away. State licensure is active until retirement and otherwise only revoked in cases of serious professional misconduct. Certifications generally must be periodically renewed by examination or the completion of a prescribed number of continuing education units (CEUs). This is often called maintenance of certification.

Nurses may also hold non-nursing credentials including academic degrees. These are usually omitted unless they are related to the nurse's job. For instance, those with master's degrees usually do not list their bachelor's degrees (only the highest earned degree), and a staff nurse would likely not list an MBA, but a nurse manager might choose to do so.

Some nurses who achieve a master's degree (MSN) leave the patient-care aspect of nursing, and practice in a more managerial role. An example would be earning an MSN in healthcare risk management. Such a nurse, while still fully an accredited nurse, will likely become the risk manager for a hospital, working in health administration rather than direct care and perhaps even becoming the director or manager of the risk-management department. In this role, he or she may never see another patient except while doing hospital inspections, or perhaps talking to a patient or the patient's family about a quality-of-care concern. In this role, the nurse becomes something similar to an auditor and a teacher of patient care quality and risk for the entire hospital staff. This nurse likely will also get the certification CPHQ: Certified Professional in Healthcare Quality.

Nursing credentials are separated from the person's name (and from each other) with commas. Usually, no periods are placed within the credentials (e.g. "BSN" not "B.S.N.")

== Nursing certifications ==
In the United States and Canada, many nurses who choose a specialty become certified in that area, signifying that they possess expert knowledge. Over 200 nursing specialties and subspecialties are available. Studies from the Institute of Medicine have demonstrated that specialty-certified nurses have higher rates of patient satisfaction and lower rates of work-related errors in patient care.

Registered nurses (RNs) are not required to be certified in a certain specialty by law. For example, it is not necessary to be a certified medical-surgical registered nurse (CMSRN) (the Academy of Medical-Surgical Nurses [AMSN] certification, administered by the Medical-Surgical Nursing Certification Board [MSNCB]) to work on a medical-surgical floor, and most medical-surgical nurses are not CMSRNs. Certifications do, however, instill professionalism and make the nurse more attractive to prospective and current employers. Certified nurses may earn a salary differential over their uncertified colleagues, but this is rare.

Some hospitals and other health-care facilities are willing to pay certified nurses extra when they work within their specialties. Also, some hospitals may require certain nurses, such as nursing supervisors or lead nurses, be certified. Certification instills confidence in the nurses. Magnet hospitals advocate certifications.

== Alphabetical listing of nursing and related credentials and certifications ==
=== Key ===
Throughout the list, the following credentialing organizations are mentioned:

- AACN: American Association of Critical-Care Nurses (http://www.aacn.org)
- AHNCC: American Holistic Nurses Credentialing Corporation (http://www.ahncc.org)
- ANCC: American Nurses Credentialing Center (https://www.nursingworld.org/ancc/)
- AANPBC: American Academy of Nurse Practitioners Certification Board (http://www.aanpcert.org)
- ONCC: Oncology Nursing Certification Corporation (http://www.oncc.org)

=== A ===
- AAS: Associate of Applied Science
- AAN: Associate of Arts in Nursing
- ABLS: Advanced Burn Life Support (not intended for postnominal use)
- ABQAURP: CHCQM - Board Certification in Health Care Quality and Management
- ACCNS-AG: Adult-Gerontology Acute Care Clinical Nurse Specialist (Certified by AACN)
- ACCNS-N: Neonatal Acute Care Clinical Nurse Specialist (Certified by AACN)
- ACCNS-P: Pediatric Acute Care Clinical Nurse Specialist (Certified by AACN)
- ACHPN: Advanced Certified Hospice and Palliative Nurse
- ACHRN: Advanced Certified Hyperbaric Registered Nurse
- ACLS: Advanced Cardiac Life Support (not intended for postnominal use)
- ACM-RN: Accredited Case Manager-Registered Nurse
- ACNP-BC: Acute Care Nurse Practitioner-Board Certified
- ACNPC: Acute Care Nurse Practitioner Certification (Certified by AACN)
- ACNPC-AG: Adult-Gerontology Acute Care Nurse Practitioner Certification (Certified by AACN)
- ACNS-BC: Adult Clinical Nurse Specialist - Board Certified
- ACRN: AIDS Certified Registered Nurse
- ADLS: Advanced Disaster Life Support
- ADN: Associate Degree in Nursing
- AFN-BC: Advanced Forensic Nursing–Board Certified (http://nursecredentialing.org/ForensicNursing-Advanced)
- AGACNP-BC: Adult-Gerontology Acute Care Nurse Practitioner-Board Certified (certified by ANCC)
- AGPCNP-BC: Adult-Gerontology Primary Care Nurse Practitioner-Board Certified (certified by ANCC)
- AGNP-C: Adult-Gerontology Primary Care Nurse Practitioner-Certified (certified by AANPBC)
- AHN-BC: Advanced Holistic Nurse-Board Certified (certified by AHNCC)
- ALNC: Advanced Legal Nurse Consultant
- AMB-BC: Ambulatory Care Nursing Certification (certified by AACN)
- ANEF: Academy of Nursing Education Fellow
- ANLC: Advanced Nurse Lactation Consultant
- ANP-BC: Adult Nurse Practitioner-Board Certified (certified by ANCC)
- ANP-C: Adult Nurse Practitioner-Certified (certified by AANPBC)
- ANVP: Advanced Neurovascular Practitioner
- AOCN: Advanced Oncology Certified Nurse
- AOCNP: Advanced Oncology Certified Nurse Practitioner
- AOCNS: Advanced Oncology Certified Clinical Nurse Specialist
- APHN-BC: Advanced Public Health Nurse-Board Certified (changed to PHNA-BC)
- APHN-BC: Advanced Practice Holistic Nurse-Board Certified (certified by AHNCC)
- APN: Advanced Practice Nurse
- APNP: Advanced Practice Nurse Prescriber
- APP: Advanced Practice Provider
- APRN: Advanced Practice Registered Nurse
- ARNP: Advanced Registered Nurse Practitioner
- ASN: Associate of Science in Nursing
- ATCN: Advanced Trauma Care for Nurses course

=== B ===
- BLS: Basic Life Support (not intended for postnominal use)
- BDLS: Basic Disaster Life Support
- BCEN: Board of Certification for Emergency Nursing (not intended for postnominal use)
- BM: Bachelor of Midwifery
- BMTCN: Blood and Marrow Transplant Certified Nurse
- BN: Bachelor of Nursing
- BNSc: Bachelor of Nursing Science
- BPS: Bachelor of Professional Studies with a concentration in Nursing
- BS: Bachelor of Science with Nursing Major
- BScN: Bachelor of Science in Nursing (Canada)
- BHSc Nsg: Bachelor of Health Science—Nursing Nursing Qualification for RNs in Australia
- BSN: Bachelor of Science in Nursing

=== C ===
- CANP: Certified Adult Nurse Practitioner
- CAPA: Certified Ambulatory Perianesthesia nurse
- CARN: Certified Addictions Registered Nurse
- CATN-I: Course in Advanced Trauma Nursing -Instructor (not intended for postnominal use)
- CATN-P: Course in Advanced Trauma Nursing -Provider (not intended for postnominal use)
- CBCN: Certified Breast Care Nurse
- CBN: Certified Bariatric Nurse
- CCCI: Canadian Certified Clinical Instructor
- CCCN: Certified Continence Care Nurse
- CCDS: Certified Clinical Documentation Specialist
- CCE: Certified Childbirth Educator
- CCHP: Certified Correctional Health Professional
- CCHP-CP: Certified Correctional Health Professional-Clinical Provider
- CCM: Certified Case Manager
- CCNS: Acute Care Clinical Nurse Specialist
- CCRN: Certification in Acute/Critical Care Nursing
- CCTC: Certified Clinical Transplant Coordinator
- CCTN: Certified Clinical Transplant Nurse
- CDAL: Certified Director of Assisted Living
- CDDN: Certified Developmental Disabilities Nurse
- CDCES: Certified Diabetes Care and Education Specialist
- CDMS: Certified Disability Management Specialist
- CDN: Certified Dialysis Nurse
- CDONA/LTC: Certified Director of Nursing Administration/Long Term Care
- C-EFM: Certified in Electronic Fetal Monitoring
- CEN: Certified Emergency Nurse
- CENP: Certified Executive in Nursing Practice
- CETN: Certified Enterostomal Therapy Nurse
- CFCN: Certified Foot Care Nurse
- CFN: Certified Forensic Nurse
- CFNP: Certified Family Nurse Practitioner
- CFPN: Certified Foundational Perioperative Nurse
- CFRN: Certified Flight Registered Nurse
- CGN: Certified Gastroenterology Nurse
- CGRN: Certified Gastroenterology Registered Nurse
- CHES: Certified Health Education Specialist
- CHN: Certified Hemodialysis Nurse
- CHPLN: Certified Hospice and Palliative Licensed Nurse
- CHPN: Certified Hospice and Palliative Nurse
- CHPNA: Certified Hospice and Palliative Nursing Assistant
- CHPPN: Certified Hospice and Palliative Pediatric Nurse
- CHRN: Certified Hyperbaric Registered Nurse
- CHSE: Certified Healthcare Simulation Educator
- CHSE-A: Certified Healthcare Simulation Educator-Advanced
- CHSOS: Certified Healthcare Simulation Operations Specialist
- CIC: Certified in Infection Control
- CLC: Certified Lactation Counselor
- CLNC: Certified Legal Nurse Consultant
- CLS: Clinical Laboratory Scientist
- CM: Certified Midwife
- CMA: Certified Medical Assistant
- CMAS: Certified Medical Audit Specialist
- CMC: Cardiac Medicine Certification
- CMCN: Certified Managed Care Nurse
- CMDSC: Certified MDS Coordinator
- CMSRN: Certified Medical—Surgical Registered Nurse
- CNA: Certified Nursing Assistant
- CNAMB: Certified Ambulatory Surgery Nurse
- CNCC(C): Certified Nurse in Critical Care (Canada)
- CNE: Certified Nursing Educator
- CNE: Chief Nurse Executive
- CNeph(C): Certified in Nephrology Nursing (Canada)
- CNL: Clinical Nurse Leader
- CNLCP: Certified Nurse Life Care Planner
- CNM: Certified Nurse Midwife
- CNML: Certified Nurse Manager and Leader
- CNN: Certified in Nephrology Nursing
- CNO: Chief Nursing Officer
- CNOR: Certified Perioperative Nurse
- CNP: Certified Nurse Practitioner
- C-NPT: Certified in Neonatal Pediatric Transport
- CNRN: Certified Neuroscience Registered Nurse
- CNS: Clinical Nurse Specialist
- CNSC: Certified Nutrition Support Clinician (Formerly CNSN: Certified Nutrition Support Nurse)
- COCN: Certified Ostomy Care Nurse
- COHC: Certified Occupational Hearing Conservationist
- COHN: Certified Occupational Health Nurse
- COHN/CM: Certified Occupational Health Nurse/Case Manager
- COHN-S: Certified Occupational Health Nurse—Specialist
- COHN-S/CM: Certified Occupational Health Nurse—Specialist/Case Manager
- CORLN: Certified Otorhinolaryngology Nurse
- CPAN: Certified Post Anesthesia Nurse
- CPDN: Certified Peritoneal Dialysis Nurse
- CPEN: Certified Pediatric Emergency Nurse
- CPHON: Certified Pediatric Hematology Oncology Nurse
- CPHQ: Certified Professional in Healthcare Quality
- CPLC: Certified in Perinatal Loss Care
- CPN: Certified Pediatric Nurse or Community Psychiatric Nurse (United Kingdom)
- CPNA: Certified Pediatric Nurse Associate
- CPNL: Certified Practical Nurse, Long-term care
- CPNP: Certified Pediatric Nurse Practitioner
- CPON: Certified Pediatric Oncology Nurse
- CPSN: Certified Plastic Surgical Nurse
- CRN: Certified Radiologic Nurse
- CRNA: Certified Registered Nurse Anesthetist
- CRNFA: Certified Registered Nurse First Assistant
- CRNI: Certified Registered Nurse Infusion
- CRNL: Certified Registered Nurse, Long-term care
- CRNO: Certified Registered Nurse in Ophthalmology
- CRNP: Certified Registered Nurse Practitioner
- CRRN: Certified Rehabilitation Registered Nurse
- CRRN-A: Certified Rehabilitation Registered Nurse—Advanced
- CS: Clinical Specialist
- CSC: Cardiac Surgery Certification
- CSHA: Certified Specialist in Hospital Accreditation
- CSN: Certified School Nurse
- C-SPI: Certified Specialist in Poison Information
- CT: Certified in Thanatology (dying, death and bereavement)
- CTN: Certified Transcultural Nurse
- CTRN: Certified Transport Registered Nurse
- CTRS: Certified Therapeutic Recreational Specialist
- CUA: Certified Urologic Associate
- CUCNS: Certified Urologic Clinical Nurse Specialist
- CUNP: Certified Urologic Nurse Practitioner
- CURN: Certified Urologic Registered Nurse
- CVICU: Cardiovascular Intensive Care Unit
- CVN: Certified Vascular Nurse
- CVOR: Cardiovascular Operating Room
- CVRN-BC: Cardiovascular Nurse-Board Certified.
- CWCN: Certified Wound Care Nurse
- CWOCN: Certified Wound, Ostomy, Continence Nurse
- CWS: Certified Wound Specialist

=== D ===
- DCNP: Dermatology Certified Nurse Practitioner
- DipNAdmin: Diploma in Nursing Administration
- DN: Doctor of Nursing
- DNP: Doctor of Nursing Practice
- DrNP: Doctor of Nursing Practice
- DNS: Doctor of Nursing Science also seen as DNSc
- DSN: Diabetes Specialist Nurse
- DWC: Diabetic Wound Certified
- DVNE: Domestic violence nurse examiner

=== E ===
- ECRN: Emergency Communications Registered Nurse (not intended for postnominal use)
- ED: Emergency Department
- EdD: Doctor of Education
- EN: Enrolled Nurse
- ENC(C): Emergency Nurse Certified (Canada)
- ENP-BC: Emergency Nurse Practitioner-Board Certified (certified by ANCC)
- ENP-C: Emergency Nurse Practitioner- Certified (certified by AANPBC)
- ENPC: Emergency Nursing Pediatric Course (not intended for postnominal use)
- ENPC-I: Emergency Nursing Pediatric Course Instructor (not intended for postnominal use)
- ENPC-P: Emergency Nursing Pediatric Course Provider (not intended for postnominal use)
- ET: Enterostomal Therapist

=== F ===
- FAADN: Fellow, Academy of Associate Degree Nursing
- FAAN: Fellow, American Academy of Nursing
- FAANA: Fellow, American Association of Nurse Anesthesiology
- FAANP: Fellow, American Association of Nurse Practitioners
- FAAOHN: Fellow, American Academy of Occupational Health Nurses
- FAAPM: Fellow, American Academy of Pain Management
- FACCWS: Fellow, American College of Certified Wound Specialists
- FACHE: Fellow, American College of Healthcare Executives
- FAEN: Fellow, Academy of Emergency Nursing
- FAHA: Fellow, American Heart Association
- FNC: Family Nurse Clinician
- FNP-C: Family Nurse Practitioner - Certified (Certified by AANPBC)
- FNP-BC: Family Nurse Practitioner - Board Certified (Certified by ANCC)
- FPNP: Family Planning Nurse Practitioner
- FRCN: Fellow, Royal College of Nursing
- FRCNA: Fellow, Royal College of Nursing, Australia
- FT: Fellow in Thanatology, Association of Death Educators and Counselors

=== G ===
- GN: Graduate Nurse (awaiting RN licensure)
- GNP: Gerontological Nurse Practitioner
- GPN: General Pediatric Nurse
- GPN: Graduate Practical Nurse
- GRN: Graduate Registered Nurse

=== H ===
- HACP: Hospital Accreditation Certified Professional
- HNB-BC: Holistic Nurse Baccalaureate-Board Certified (certified by AHNCC)
- HNC: Holistic Nurse, Certified (changed to HN-BC)
- HN-BC: Holistic Nurse-Board Certified (certified by AHNCC)
- HWNC-BC: Health and Wellness Nurse Coach-Board Certified (certified by AHNCC)

=== I ===
- IBQH: International Board for Quality in Healthcare
- IBCLC: International Board-Certified Lactation Consultant
- ICC: Intensive Care Certification
- ICU: Intensive Care Unit
- INC: Intensive Neonatal Care certification
- INS: Informatics Nurse Specialist
- IPN: Immunisation Program Nurse: Queensland Australia specialist qualification / endorsement
- IR: Interventional Radiology

=== L ===
- LCCE: Lamaze Certified Childbirth Educator
- LGN: Licensed Graduate Nurse(British Columbia, Canada)
- LGN(P): Licensed Graduate Nurse, Provisional(British Columbia, Canada)
- LNC: Legal Nurse Consultant
- LNCC: Legal Nurse Consultant, Certified
- LNP: Licensed Nurse Practitioner—Used by the Commonwealth of Virginia, Board of Nursing, as a license status
- LPN: Licensed Practical Nurse
- LPT: Licensed Psychiatric Technician
- LSN: Licensed School Nurse
- LTAC: Long Term Acute Care
- LTC: Long Term Care (LPN Specific)
- LVN: Licensed Vocational Nurse

=== M ===
- MA: Master of Arts
- MACN: Member, Australian College of Nursing, Australia
- MAN: Master of Arts in Nursing
- MICT: Master of Information and Communication Technology
- MICU: Medical intensive care unit
- MICU: Mobile intensive care unit
- ME: Menopause Educator
- MEd: Master of Education
- MEmerg Nsg: Master's degree in Emergency Nursing Australia
- MENP: Master of Entry to Nursing Practice (for any non-nursing bachelor's degree)
- MHN: Mental Health Nurse—Registered Nurse Endorsed to practice Advanced nursing in Mental Health
- MICN: Mobile Intensive Care Nurse
- MN: Master of Nursing
- MPH: Master of Public Health
- MRCN: Member, Royal College of Nursing (UK)
- MS: Master of Science
- MSA: Medicare Set-Aside
- MSN: Master of Science in Nursing
- MSN/Ed: Master of Science in Nursing Education
- MSN-NLM: Master of Science in Nursing, Nursing Leadership and Management.

=== N ===
- NC-BC: Nurse Coach-Board Certified (certified by AHNCC)
- NCMP: Certified Menopause Practitioner
- NCSN: National Certified School Nurse
- NE-BC: Nurse Executive-Board Certified
- NEA-BC: Nurse Executive Advanced-Board Certified
- NHDP-BC: National Healthcare Disaster Professional-Board Certified
- NICU: Neonatal Intensive Care Unit
- NNP-BC: Neonatal Nurse Practitioner
- NP(A): Nurse Practitioner, Adult(British Columbia, Canada)
- NP(F): Nurse Practitioner, Family(British Columbia, Canada)
- NP(P): Nurse Practitioner, Pediatrics(British Columbia, Canada)
- NP-C: Nurse Practitioner, Certified (certified by AANPBC)
- NPP: Nurse Practitioner, Psychiatric
- NSE: Nursing Student Extern
- NSWOC: Nurses Specialized in Wound, Ostomy and Continence
- NRP: Neonatal Resuscitation Program (not intended for postnominal use)
- NVRN: Neurovascular Registered Nurse
- NZCFN: New Zealand Certified Flight Nurse
- NPS: Neonatal / Pediatric Specialty

=== O ===
- OCN: Oncology Certified Nurse
- OMS: Ostomy Management Specialist
- ONC: Orthopaedic Nurse Certified

=== P ===
- PACU: Post-anesthesia care unit
- PALS: Pediatric Advanced Life Support (not intended for postnominal use)
- PCCN: Progressive Care Certified Nurse
- PCNS: Pediatric Clinical Nurse Specialist
- PhD: Doctor of Philosophy
- PHN: Public Health Nurse
- PHNA-BC: Advanced Public Health Nurse
- PHRN: Pre-Hospital Registered Nurse
- PICU: Pediatric Intensive Care Unit
- PMH-BC: Psychiatric Mental Health Nurse
- PMHNP-BC: Psychiatric Mental Health Nurse Practitioner
- PMHCNS-BC: Psychiatric Mental Health Clinical Nurse Specialist
- PNP-BC: Pediatric Nurse Practitioner - Board Certified
- PNP-AC: Pediatric Nurse Practitioner - Acute Care
- PNP-PC: Pediatric Nurse Practitioner - Primary Care

=== Q ===
- QN: Queen's Nurse

=== R ===
- RAC-CT: Resident Assessment Coordinator
- RCP: Respiratory Care Practitioner
- RDN: Registered Dental Nurse (United Kingdom)
- RIN: Rural and Isolated Practice Registered Nurses (RIPRN) (Queensland, Australia)
- RM: Registered Midwife
- RMN: Registered Mental Nurse (United Kingdom)
- RN: Registered Nurse
- RN-BC: Registered Nurse, ANCC Board Certified
- RN(C): Registered Nurse, Certified Practice(British Columbia, Canada)
- RN(P): Registered Nurse, Provisional(British Columbia, Canada)
- RN(T): Registered Nurse, Temporary(British Columbia, Canada)
- RNC: Registered Nurse, Certified: American Academy Certified Nurse
- RNC-LRN: Registered nurse certified in low-risk neonatal nursing
- RNC-MNN: Registered nurse certified in maternal newborn nursing
- RNC-NIC: Registered nurse certified in neonatal intensive care
- RNC-OB: Registered nurse certified in inpatient obstetrics
- RNCS: Registered Nurse Clinical Specialist
- RNCS: Registered Nurse Certified Specialist
- RNFA: Registered Nurse First Assistant
- RNM: Registered Nurse-Midwife
- RNLD: Registered Nurse Learning Disabilities
- RPN: Registered practical nurse
- RPN: Registered Psychiatric Nurse (Western Canada)
- RRT: Registered Respiratory Therapist

=== S ===
- SANE: Sexual Assault Nurse Examiner
- SANE-A: Certified Sexual Assault Nurse Examiner-Adult/Adolescent
- SANE-P: Certified Sexual Assault Nurse Examiner-Pediatric
- SCN: Supervisory Clinical Nurse
- SCRN: Stroke Certified Registered Nurse
- SEN: State Enrolled Nurse
- SHN: Sexual and Reproductive Health endorsed RN—Queensland Australia
- SN: Student Nurse (RN preparation)
- SNSC: School Nurse Services Credential (California CTC)
- SPN: Student Nurse (LPN preparation)
- SRNA: Student Registered Nurse Anesthetist(CRNA preparation)
- SVN: Student Nurse (LVN preparation)

=== T ===
- TCAR: Trauma Care After Resuscitation course
- TCRN: Trauma Certified Registered Nurse
- TNCC: Trauma Nursing Core Course (not intended for postnominal use)
- TNCC-I: Trauma Nursing Core Course Instructor (not intended for postnominal use)
- TNCC-P: Trauma Nursing Core Course Provider (not intended for postnominal use)
- TNP: Telephone Nursing Practitioner
- TNS: Trauma Nurse Specialist

=== V ===
- VA-BC: Vascular Access Board Certified

=== W ===
- WCC: Wound Care Certified
- WHNP-BC: Women's Health Care Nurse Practitioner
- CWOCN: Certified Wound, Ostomy, and Continence Nurse
- WTA-C: Certified Wound Treatment Associate
