= List of healthcare occupations =

A list of healthcare occupations by medical discipline.

== Anesthesiology ==
- Anesthesiologist
- Anesthesiology Fellow
- Certified Registered Nurse Anesthetist
- Registered Respiratory Therapist
- Anesthesiologist Assistant

== Cardiovascular medicine ==
- Cardiologist
- Cardiology Fellow
- Cardiology Physician Assistant
- Cardiac Scientist
- Cardiovascular Technologist

== Critical care medicine ==
- Intensivist
- Neonatologist
- Critical Care Medicine Physician Assistant
- Critical Care Nurse Practitioner
- Critical Care Registered Nurse
- Critical Care Respiratory Therapist

== Dentistry ==
- Dentist
- Dental Hygienist
- Denturist
- Dental Assistant
- Dental Technician

== Dermatology ==
- Dermatologist
- Dermatology Physician Assistant

== Dietetics ==
- Dietitian

== Emergency medicine ==
- Emergency physician
- Emergency Physician Assistant
- Emergency Nurse Practitioner
- Flight Nurse
- Certified Emergency Nursing Assistant
- Certified Emergency Registered Nurse
- Certified Emergency Registered Respiratory Therapist
- Emergency Medical Technician - Critical Care Paramedic
- Emergency Medical Technician - Paramedic
- Emergency Medical Technician - Intermediate 99
- Emergency Medical Technician - Intermediate 85
- Emergency Medical Technician - Basic

== Endocrinology ==
- Endocrinologist
- Endocrinology Physician Assistant

== Gastroenterology ==
- Gastroenterologist
- Gastroenterology Physician Assistant

== Genetics ==
- Genetic Counselor/Counsellor

== Geriatric medicine ==
- Geriatrician
- Geriatric Medicine Physician Assistant
- Gerontological Nurse Practitioner
- Occupational Therapist

== Haematology ==
- Haematologist
- Haematology Physician Assistant
- Medical Laboratory Technician
- Phlebotomist

== Immunology ==
- Immunologist

== Nephrology ==
- Nephrologist
- Nephrology Physician Assistant
- Dialysis Technician

== Neurology ==
- Neurologist
- Neurology Physician assistant
- Occupational Therapist
- Speech Language Pathologist
- Audiologist
- Neuropsychologist
- Neurodiagnostic Technologist

== Oncology ==
- Oncologist
- Oncology Physician Assistant
- Radiation Therapist
- Medical Physicist

== Ophthalmology ==
- Ophthalmologist
- Eye Surgery

== Optometry ==
- Optometrist
- Occupational Therapist- Low Vision Rehab

== Otorhinolaryngology ==
- Otolaryngologist (ear, nose, and throat physician)
- Otorhinolaryngology physician assistant

== Pastoral care ==
- Healthcare chaplain

== Pathology ==
- Pathologist

== Pulmonology (Respirology) ==
- Pulmonologist
- Pulmonology/respirology physician assistant
- Registered Respiratory Therapist

== Primary care medicine ==
- Community health center clinician
- General practitioner
- Primary care physician
- Internist
- Physician assistant
- Family nurse practitioner
- Pharmacist

== Pediatric medicine ==
- Neonatologist
- Pediatrician
- Pediatric Physician Assistant
- Neonatal Nurse Practitioner
- Pediatric Nurse Practitioner
- Occupational Therapist- Neonatal/ Pediatric
- Pediatric Nurse
- Pediatric Respiratory Therapist

== Pharmacy ==
- Pharmacist
- Pharmacy technician

== Podiatric medicine ==
- Podiatric Surgeon
- Doctor of Podiatric Medicine
- Podiatrist
- Chiropodist

== Psychiatry ==
- Psychiatrist
- Psychiatry Physician Assistant
- Psychologist
- Psychiatric Nurse Practitioner
- Mental Health Nurse Practitioner
- Occupational Therapist
- Social Worker
- Mental Health Counselor

== Public Health and Preventive Medicine ==
- Community Health Worker
- Medical Officer of Health
- Environmental Health Officer
- Epidemiologist
- Public Health Nurse

== Orthopedics, rheumatology, and movement ==
- Orthopedic Physician
- Orthopaedic Physician´s Assistant
- Sport Psychologist
- Physical Therapist
- Occupational Therapist
- Physical Therapy Assistant
- Occupational Therapy Assistant
- Orthopaedic Technologist or Prosthetist & Orthotist
- Chiropractor
- Biokineticist
- Athletic Trainer
- Yoga Instructor
- Massage Therapist

== Radiology ==
- Radiologist
- Radiology Physician Assistant
- Radiotherapist, also known as a Radiation Therapist or Therapeutic Radiographer
- Radiographer, also known as a Radiologic Technologist
  - CT Radiographer
  - Interventional Radiographer
  - Mammographer
  - Neuroradiographer
  - Medical Dosimetry Technologist
  - Radiologist Practitioner Assistant
  - Reporting Radiographer
  - Sonographer

== Reproductive medicine ==
- Obstetrician
- Gynaecologist
- OB/GYN Physician Assistant
- Women's Health Nurse Practitioner
- Nurse-Midwife
- Midwife
- Lactation consultant

== Surgery ==
- General Doctor
- Bariatric Surgeon
- Cardiothoracic surgeon
- Cardiac Surgeon
- Hepatic Biliary Pancreatic Surgeon
- Neurosurgeon
- Podiatric Surgeon
- Surgery Physician Assistant

== Urology ==
- Urologist
- Urology Physician Assistant
