= Mental health nurse =

Nurse who specialises in care for patients with mental health issues

A mental health nurse (MHN) refers to a nurse in the UK, who specialises in the care of patients with mental health issues. The practice of MHNs is called mental health nursing.

== Background ==
MHNs comprise approximately 12% of the total NHS Nursing workforce. In order to qualify as a MHN in the UK, a Nursing & Midwifery Council (NMC) accredited nursing degree or diploma is required. Registration must be renewed every three years, for which 450 hours of registered practice and 35 hours of study must have been completed in the past three years. The total number of registered mental health nurses in the UK was 48,130 in 2010, however, since then there has been a slight decrease, as some nurses have transferred over to voluntary and independent providers. MHNs typically work within community or hospital settings, as part of Crisis Assessment and Treatment, inpatient environments and/or community mental health teams.

== Roles ==
MHNs act to bridge the gap between mental health services and general practice for patients with acute to chronic mental illnesses. The role of an MHN has gradually transitioned over the years, to encompass a greater level of involvement in patient care e.g. nurses now have authority to prescribe medication. The main responsibilities of a MHN can be subdivided into six broad categories with a certain degree of overlap:

- Case management: This consists of tailoring care to the specific needs of an individual. It involves providing interventions in the form of psychotherapy or familial support; arranging other services when required; establishing networks with community agencies; overseeing changes in medication; community integration and actively seeking out people who drop out of services.
- Psychosocial interventions: A holistic approach to patient care is required, by which the MHN should build rapport with patients to encourage trust, while listening to and interpreting their needs and concerns. If a patient is having social/financial problems, the MHN may offer advice and interventions e.g. by arranging social events in the community, in order to develop patients' socials skills and combat feelings of isolation. They may also work with patients' families and carers, helping to educate them about the burden of mental illness.
- Physical health: Individuals with long-term mental illness may have substantial cardiometabolic/ respiratory illnesses. Furthermore, this population is at considerable risk of contracting infections, such as HIV and AIDS. The MHN will prepare and maintain comprehensive patient records, whilst also producing care plans and risk assessments. They must also monitor weight, blood pressure and provide health education and interventions in areas such as diet, smoking and sexual behaviour.
- Medication management: MHN must ensure correct administration of medication, including injections, and monitoring the results of treatment.
- Working with dual diagnosis patients, and promoting a 'recovery' based approach to care.
- Behavioural therapy: Providing evidence- based individual therapy e.g. cognitive behavioural therapy for depression and anxiety. Empathising with distressed patients and applying de-escalation techniques to help patients manage their emotions and behaviour better. Encourage patients to take part in therapeutic hobbies such as art or drama.

== See also ==
- Community psychiatric nurse
- Psychiatric-mental health nurse practitioner
- Registered psychiatric nurse
