= Registered nurse certified in neonatal intensive care =

Medical profession

In the United States, a registered nurse certified in neonatal intensive care (RNC-NIC) is a neonatal intensive care nurse who has earned nursing board certification. The certification is established by an exam that is one of the core certification exams offered by the National Certification Corporation (NCC).

The organization's other core registered nurse certifications include low-risk neonatal (RNC-LRN), maternal newborn nursing (RNC-MNN) and inpatient obstetrics (RNC-OB) for nurses in those related specialties.

Neonatal nursing is a specialty where the nurses care for newborn babies who need critical care. This may include newborns who are very sick, need immediate surgery, or have birth defects. Neonatal nurses will provide care around the clock to these infants.

== See also ==
- List of nursing credentials
