= Gail Wiscarz Stuart =

American nurse

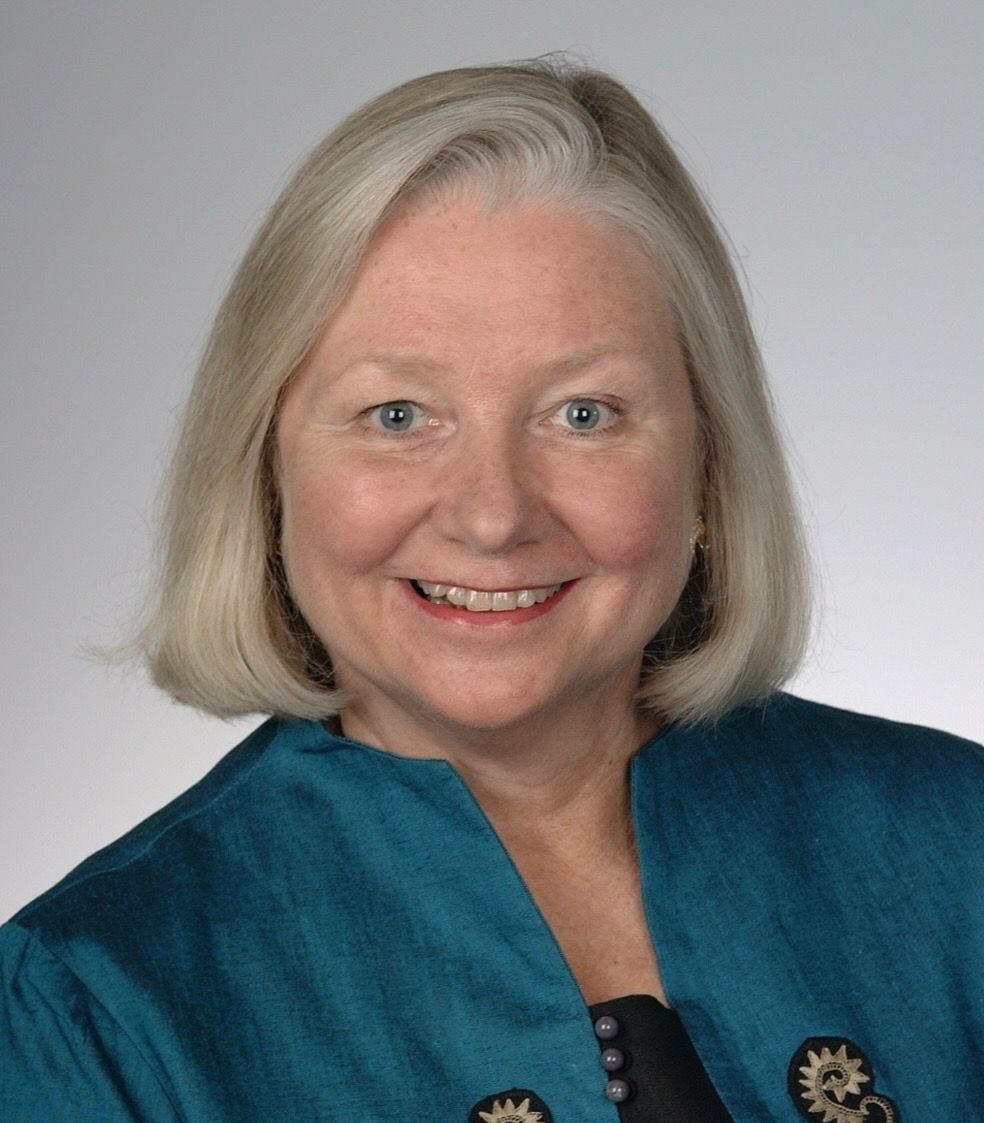
- Education: Georgetown University; University of Maryland; Johns Hopkins University School of Hygiene and Public Health
- Occupation: Nurse
- Years active: 1970s-present
- Known for: Stress Adaptation Model; Principles and Practice of Psychiatric Nursing
- Medical career
- Profession: Nurse, Dean Emerita
- Field: psychiatric and mental health nursing
- Institutions: Medical University of South Carolina; University of Maryland School of Nursing; King's College London; American Psychiatric Nurses Association
- Awards: Fellow of American Academy of Nursing

Gail Wiscarz Stuart is an American nurse, academic, and educator known for work in psychiatric-mental health nursing and nursing education. She is Dean Emerita and Distinguished University Professor at the Medical University of South Carolina (MUSC) College of Nursing. She is known for developing Stress Adaptation Model, a nursing-oriented framework that integrates biological, psychological, sociocultural, environmental, and legal-ethical factors She is a fellow of American Academy of Nursing.

She is the author and editor of multiple editions of Principles and Practice of Psychiatric Nursing, a textbook used in nursing education.

== Education ==
Stuart earned a Bachelor of Science in Nursing from Georgetown University in 1971, graduating cum laude. She went on to complete a Master of Science in Psychiatric Nursing and Education at the University of Maryland in 1973, graduating summa cum laude and received her Ph.D. in Behavioral Sciences from the Johns Hopkins University School of Hygiene and Public Health in 1985. She also completed postdoctoral training as a van Ameringen Fellow at The Beck Institute for Cognitive Therapy and Research between 1998 and 1999.

== Career ==
Stuart began her academic career in the 1970s at the University of Maryland School of Nursing, where she held various faculty roles. She joined the Medical University of South Carolina in 1985, holding multiple academic and administrative positions across the College of Nursing and Medicine.

In 2002, Stuart was appointed Dean of the MUSC College of Nursing, a position she held until her retirement in 2018.

In 2014, Stuart and her faculty secured support from the Josiah Macy Jr. Foundation to develop the Virtual Interprofessional Learning (VIP) platform, a simulation-based education tool designed to enhance interprofessional collaboration in healthcare.

Stuart has also contributed to discussions on diversity and inclusion in nursing education. During her tenure, the MUSC College of Nursing implemented a Cultural Competence Model of Care and published diversity-related efforts in Lifelines magazine.

Stuart was named Dean Emerita upon retirement in June 2018. She continues to serve as Distinguished University Professor at MUSC and holds a joint appointment in the Department of Psychiatry and Behavioral Sciences in the College of Medicine.

She held board certification as a clinical nurse specialist in adult psychiatric and mental health nursing from the American Nurses Credentialing Center from 1979 to 2009.

She was a visiting professor at King's College London, Institute of Psychiatry at the Maudsley, a consultant to the Mental Health Training Program in Te Pou, New Zealand, and developed Mental Health Training Programs for clinicians in Liberia.

She has participated in collaborative research on issues such as psychopharmacology, violence prevention, evidence-based practice, interdisciplinary care, technology, and the mental health needs of specific populations, including veterans and individuals with chronic mental illness. She served as president of the American Psychiatric Nurses Association, president of the American College of Mental Health Administration, and president and executive director of the Annapolis Coalition on the Behavioral Health Workforce.

== Research ==
Stuart's work has contributed to the development of psychiatric and mental health nursing through clinical practice, academic and scholarly publication. Her research emphasizes a holistic approach to mental health care, incorporating biological, psychological, sociocultural, environmental, and legal-ethical perspectives.

Stuart developed the Stress Adaptation Model, a nursing-oriented framework that integrates biological, psychological, sociocultural, environmental, and legal-ethical factors. Her model provides structure for interpreting patient behavior and guiding psychiatric nursing care. It emphasizes a holistic view of health and wellness. Stuart's approach is used in psychiatric nursing education and practice.

== Selected publications ==
=== Books ===
- Stuart, Gail Wiscarz (2012). Principles and Practice of Psychiatric Nursing - E-Book: Principles and Practice of Psychiatric Nursing - E-Book (10th ed.). Chantilly: Mosby. ISBN 978-0-323-29412-6.
- Stuart, Gail Wiscarz (January 1988). Pocket Nurse Guide to Psychiatric Nursing. Mosby. p. 361. ISBN 9780801648564.
- Stuart, Gail Wiscarz (February 2005). Handbook of Psychiatric Nursing. Mosby. p. 480. ISBN 9780323035026.
- Stuart, Gail Wiscarz (October 2008). Virtual Clinical Excursions 3.0 for Principles and Practice of Psychiatric Nursing. Mosby. p. 192. ISBN 9780323057653.
- Stuart, Gail Wiscarz (January 1995). Quick Psychopharmacology Reference. Mosby Elsevier Health Science. p. 65. ISBN 9780801680649.

=== Journal articles ===
- Stuart, Gail W.; Erkel, Elizabeth A.; Shull, Lynn H. (2010). "Allocating resources in a data-driven college of nursing". Nursing Outlook. 58 (4): 200–206. doi:10.1016/j.outlook.2010.05.002. ISSN 0029-6554.
- Stuart, Gail W.; Hoge, Michael A.; Morris, John A.; Adams, Neal; Daniels, Allen S. (2009). "The Annapolis Coalition Report on the Behavioral Health Workforce Needs of the United States: International Implications". International Journal of Mental Health. 38 (1): 46–60. doi:10.2753/imh0020-7411380104. ISSN 0020-7411.
- Weiss, Sandra J.; Haber, Judith; Horowitz, June Andrews; Stuart, Gail W.; Wolfe, Barbara (2009). "The Inextricable Nature of Mental and Physical Health: Implications for Integrative Care". Journal of the American Psychiatric Nurses Association. 15 (6): 371–382. doi:10.1177/1078390309352513. ISSN 1078-3903.
- Stuart, Gail W.; Laraia, Michele T.; Ballenger, James C.; Lydiard, R. Bruce (1990). "Early family experiences of women with bulimia and depression". Archives of Psychiatric Nursing. 4 (1): 43–52. doi:10.1016/s0883-9417(05)80010-x. ISSN 0883-9417.
- Stuart, Gail W.; Worley, Nancy; Morris, John A.; Bevilacqua, Joseph J. (2000). "Role Utilization of Nurses in Public Psychiatry". Administration and Policy in Mental Health and Mental Health Services Research. 27 (6): 423–441. doi:10.1023/a:1021394326424. ISSN 0894-587X.
- Stuart, Gail W. (2001). "Evidence-Based Psychiatric Nursing Practice: Rhetoric or Reality". Journal of the American Psychiatric Nurses Association. 7 (4): 103–114. doi:10.1067/mpn.2001.116352. ISSN 1078-3903.
- Killeen, Therese K.; Haight, Barbara; Brady, Kathleen; Herman, Joanne; Michel, Yvonne; Stuart, Gail; Young, Sue (2002). "THE EFFECT OF AURICULAR ACUPUNCTURE ON PSYCHOPHYSIOLOGICAL MEASURES OF COCAINE CRAVING". Issues in Mental Health Nursing. 23 (5): 445–459. doi:10.1080/01612840290052631. ISSN 0161-2840.
- Stuart, Gail W. (2006). "Guest Editorial: What is the NCLEX really testing?". Nursing Outlook. 54 (1): 1–2. doi:10.1016/j.outlook.2005.11.002. ISSN 0029-6554.
- Stuart, Gail W (1994). "VULNERABLE OR VALUABLE: Psychiatric Nursing's Future in Health Care Reform". Journal of Psychosocial Nursing and Mental Health Services. 32 (6): 53–54. doi:10.3928/0279-3695-19940601-19. ISSN 0279-3695.
- Hoge, Michael; Morris, John; Stuart, Gail; Huey, Leighton; Bergeson, Sue; Flaherty, Michael; Morgan, Oscar; Peterson, Janice; Daniels, Allen; Paris, Manuel; Madenwald, Kappy (2009-07-01). "A National Action Plan for Workforce Development in Behavioral Health". Psychiatric Services. 60 (7). doi:10.1176/appi.ps.60.7.883. ISSN 1075-2730.
