= Uganda Specialized Nursing University =

Ugandan university

Uganda Specialized Nursing University (USNU)
- Type: Private
- Established: 2019 (Expected)
- Location: Kampala, Uganda; 00°20′23″N 32°34′50″E
- Campus: Urban

The Uganda Specialized Nursing University (USNU) is a planned private university in Uganda. When completed, the university will offer specialized nursing training to nurses from Uganda and neighboring countries.

== Location ==
The university campus would be located on Mulago Hill in the Kawempe Division of the city of Kampala, Uganda's capital and oldest city. The land on which the university campus will stand is owned by the Uganda Nurses and Midwives Union, who also own the university.

== Overview ==
As of June 2019, Uganda, a country with a population of over 40 million people, lacks an institution that offers specialized nursing training. When completed, USNU will offer specialized nursing training in such areas as (a) Cardiac nursing (b) Critical care nursing (c) Orthopedic nursing (d) Pediatric nursing (e) Neonatal nursing (f) Neurosurgery nursing (g) Trauma nursing (h) Urology nursing (i) Dialysis nursing (j) Transplant surgery nursing (k) Emergency Room nursing and other specialized nursing disciplines. Before the establishment of USNU, government sent nurses to acquire specialized training outside the country, at considerable taxpayer expense.

== History ==
In 1993, the Government of Uganda donated land on Mulago Hill to the Uganda Nurses and Midwives Union. Originally, the plan was to build the Union's headwaters on the site. However in 2019, the Union plans to start the construction of USNU on that land. Funding for the construction is expected to come from the Ugandan government and donations.

== Academics ==
The lecturers at the university are expected to be sourced from Uganda and from universities in the United States and Australia that are affiliated with the Uganda Nurses and Midwives Union.

== See also ==
- Education in Uganda
- List of universities in Uganda
