= Grayce =

Grayce is a given name. Notable people with the name include:

- Grayce Hampton (1876–1963), British film and stage actress
- Grayce Sills (1926–2016), American psychiatric nurse, educator, author, and nurse administrator
- Grayce Uyehara (1919–2014), Japanese-American social worker and activist

== See also ==
- Grace (given name)
