= National Certification Corporation =

- Abbreviation: NCC
- Formation: 1975
- Type: Not-for-profit organization
- Purpose: Credentialing, certification, and education of nurses
- Headquarters: Chicago, Illinois
- Region served: United States
- Website: www.nccwebsite.org

The National Certification Corporation (NCC) was established for the development, administration, and evaluation of a program for certification in obstetric, gynecologic and neo-natal nursing specialties in the United States. Incorporated in 1975 and governed by a board of directors, NCC's certification program is accredited by the National Commission for Certifying Agencies (NCCA), the accreditation body of the Institute for Credentialing Excellence. By 2009, NCC had awarded over 95,000 certifications and certificates of added qualification.

== Examinations ==
=== Core certification ===
- Registered Nurse Certified in Maternal Newborn Nursing (RNC-MNN)
- Registered Nurse Certified in Neonatal Intensive Care (RNC-NIC)
- Registered Nurse Certified in Inpatient Obstetrics (RNC-OB)
- Registered Nurse Certified in Low Risk Neonatal Nursing (RNC-LRN)

=== Nurse practitioner certification ===
- Women's Health Care Nurse Practitioner (WHNP-BC)
- Neonatal Nurse Practitioner (NNP-BC)

=== Certificates of added qualification ===
- Certified in Electronic Fetal Monitoring (C-EFM)
- Certified in Neonatal Pediatric Transport (C-NPT)
