= MHNP =

MHNP may refer to:

- Muséum national d'histoire naturelle, French national natural history museum, Paris (although the official initialism for that museum is MNHN);
- Psychiatric and mental health Nurse Practitioner.
