= Journal of Psychiatric and Mental Health Nursing =

- Discipline: Psychiatric and mental health nursing
- Language: English
- Edited by: Lawrie Elliott

Publication details
- History: 1994-present
- Publisher: John Wiley & Sons
- Frequency: Bimonthly
- Impact factor: 2.952 (2020)

Standard abbreviations
- ISO 4: J. Psychiatr. Ment. Health Nurs.

Indexing
- CODEN: JPMNE3
- ISSN: 1351-0126 (print); 1365-2850 (web)
- LCCN: sn95038551
- OCLC no.: 973870221

Links
- Journal homepage; Online access; Online archive

The Journal of Psychiatric and Mental Health Nursing is a bimonthly peer-reviewed medical journal covering psychiatric and mental health nursing. It was established in 1994 and is published by John Wiley & Sons. The editor-in-chief is Lawrie Elliott (Glasgow Caledonian University). According to Journal Citation Reports, the journal has a 2020 impact factor of 2.952, ranking it 14th out of 122 journals in the category "Nursing (Social Science)".
