= ONC =

ONC may refer to:

== Places ==
- Old North Church, Boston, US
- Old North Church (Sierra Madre, California), US

== Science and technology ==
- Ocean Networks Canada, a University of Victoria initiative
- Octanitrocubane, an explosive
- Oncidium (Onc.), an orchid genus
- Open Network Computing, a remote procedure call system
- Operational Navigation Chart, the basis of the Digital Chart of the World
- Ordinary National Certificate
- Orthopaedic Nurse Certified

== Organizations ==
- Office of the National Coordinator for Health Information Technology
- Oficiul Naţional Cinematografic, an agency in Romanian cinema
- Olivet Nazarene College or Olivet Nazarene University
