= GPnotebook =

British medical database

Content
- Description: Medical database, and encyclopedia for medicine in English
- Organisms: Human

Contact
- Research center: Oxbridge Solutions Limited

Access
- Website: gpnotebook.com

Miscellaneous
- License: Proprietary

GPnotebook is a British medical database for general practitioners (GPs). It is an online encyclopaedia of medicine that provides an immediate reference resource for clinicians worldwide. The database consists of over 30,000 index terms and over two million words of information. GPnotebook is provided online by Oxbridge Solutions Limited.

GPnotebook website is primarily designed with the needs of general practitioners (GPs) in mind, and written by a variety of specialists, ranging from paediatrics to accident and emergency.

The original idea for the database began in the canteen of John Radcliffe Hospital in 1990 while James McMorran, a first-year Oxford University clinical student, was writing up his medical notes. Instead of writing notes in longhand, he wrote his notes in ‘mind maps’ of packets of information linking different concepts and conditions in a two-dimensional representation of clinical knowledge. James discussed with Stewart McMorran (then a medical student at Cambridge University and a talented computer programmer) this way of representing medical knowledge and between them they created the authoring software to produce linking ‘packets’ of information in a database. This first authoring software and database was the origin of what today is GPnotebook. It was, in effect, a medical ‘Wiki’ over 16 years before the first ‘Wiki’!

Initially, James used the authoring software alone to capture his own clinical learning. There was interest from other medical students at Oxford and in the end a team of six authors (mainly Oxford medical students) became the founding (and continuing) principal authors of GPnotebook. Among them was Damian Crowther who, in time, took over the role of technical lead for the project. James takes the role of editorial lead for the website. Damian developed the software for the web version of the database which was released on the worldwide web in 2001 as GPnotebook.

GPnotebook is used within consultation by general practitioners and is often used to access information about rare diseases
