= Advanced Emergency Nursing Journal =

- Discipline: Emergency nursing
- Language: English
- Edited by: K. Sue Hoyt

Publication details
- Former name(s): Topics in Emergency Medicine
- History: 1979-present
- Publisher: Lippincott Williams & Wilkins
- Frequency: Quarterly
- Open access: Hybrid

Standard abbreviations
- ISO 4: Adv. Emerg. Nurs. J.

Indexing
- ISSN: 1931-4485 (print); 1931-4493 (web)
- LCCN: sf80000701
- OCLC no.: 66386257

Links
- Journal homepage; Online access; Online archive

Advanced Emergency Nursing Journal is a peer-reviewed nursing journal for advanced practice registered nurses in the field of emergency nursing. The journal was established in 1979 as Topics in Emergency Medicine and obtained its current title in 2006. It is published by Lippincott Williams & Wilkins and the editors-in-chief are K. Sue Hoyt (St. Mary Medical Center (Long Beach)) and Jean A. Proehl (Dartmouth–Hitchcock Medical Center).

== Abstracting and indexing ==
The journal is abstracted and indexed in Index Medicus/MEDLINE/PubMed and Scopus.
