= Certified in neonatal pediatric transport =

Medical profession

Certified in Neonatal Pediatric Transport (C-NPT) is the designation in the USA for a paramedic, physician, respiratory therapist, neonatal nurse, nurse practitioner, nurse or physician assistant who has earned certification from the National Certification Corporation in neonatal and pediatric transport. This certificate of added qualification was rolled out in 2009. National Certification Corporation utilizes applied measurement professionals to administer its tests.

== Material sources ==
The National Certification Corporation uses many sources for its test questions.

=== Book sources ===
- Jenkins, James. Advanced Pediatric Emergency Care, Pearson Prentice Hall, NJ, 2007.
- Martin, T. AeroTransportation: A Clinical Guide, Martin, T, Ashgate, 2006.
- Holleran, Renee. Air & Surface Patient Transport Principles and Practice, Mosby, St. Louis, 2003.
- Woodward et al. Air and Ground Transport of Neonatal and Pediatric Patients, AAP, Illinois, 2007.
- Atlas of Procedures in Neonatology, MacDonald, LWW, 2007.
- Kenner et al. Comprehensive Neonatal Care An Interdisciplinary Approach, Saunders, Philadelphia, 2007.
- Verklan et al. Core Curriculum for Neonatal Intensive Care Nursing, Saunders, Philadelphia, 2009.
- Slotga et al. Core Curriculum for Pediatric Critical Care Nursing, AACN, Saunders, Philadelphia, 2006.
- Hay et al. Current Diagnosis & Treatment in Pediatrics, McGraw Hill, NY, 2007.
- Wilkins et al. Egan’s Fundamentals of Respiratory Care, Mosby, 2009.
- Merenstein et al. Handbook of Neonatal Intensive Care, Mosby, St. Louis, 2006.
- Remington and Klein. Infectious Diseases of the Fetus and Newborn, Elsevier Saunders, Philadelphia, 2006.
- Cherbick. Kendig’s Disorders of the Respiratory Tract in Children, Saunders Elsevier, Philadelphia, 2006.
- Cloherty et al. Manual of Neonatal Care, LWW, 2007.
- Blackburn, Susan. Maternal, Fetal & Neonatal Physiology, Saunders, Philadelphia, 2007.
- Saunders, Micki. Mosby’s Paramedic Textbook, Mosby, St. Louis, 2007.
- Kliegman et al. Nelson Essentials of Pediatrics, Elsevier, Philadelphia, 2006.
- Yaffe. Neonatal and Pediatric Pharmacology Therapeutic Principles in Practice, LWW, 2005.
- Martin. Neonatal Perinatal Medicine, Elsevier Saunders, Philadelphia, 2005.
- Neonatal Resusictation Textbook, AHA/AAP, 2006.
- Volpe. Neurology of the Newborn, Saunders Elsevier, Philadelphia, 2008.
- Aehlert, Barbara. Pediatric Advanced Life Support, Mosby, St. Louis, 2007.
- Park, Myung. Pediatric Cardiology for Practitioner, Mosby, St. Louis, 2008.
- Taketomo. Pediatric Dosage Handbook, Lexi-Comp, 2008.
- Dieckman, Ronald. Pediatric Education for Prehospital Professionals, AAP, 2008.
- Baren et al. Pediatric Emergency Medicine, Saunders, Philadelphia, 2008.
- Wesson, David. Pediatric Trauma Pathophysiology, Diagnosis and Treatment, Taylor and Francis, NY, 2006.
- Red Book: 2006 Report of the Committee on Infectious Diseases, AAP, Illinois, 2006.
- Rennie. Robertson’s Textbook of Neonatology, Elsevier, 2005.
- McInerny. Textbook of Pediatric Care, McInerny, AAP, Illinois, 2009.
- King et al. Textbook of Pediatric Emergency Procedures, LWW, 2008.

=== Journal sources ===
- Advances in Neonatal Care
- Air Medical Journal
- Clinics in Perinatology
- Newborn and Infant Nursing Reviews
- Paediatrics and Child Health
- Pediatric Clinics of North America
- Pediatrics
- Respiratory Clinics of North America
- Seminars in Perinatology
- The Journal of Perinatal & Neonatal Nursing

== See also ==
- List of nursing credentials
