= Flight Surgeon Badge =

The Flight Surgeon Badge is a military insignia which is issued to personnel who are qualified as military flight surgeons from various countries.

Badges include:

- Canadian Forces Flight Surgeon Wings
- U.S. Military Flight Surgeon Badge
