= Orthopaedic Nursing (journal) =

- Discipline: Orthopaedic nursing
- Language: English
- Edited by: Mary F. Rodts

Publication details
- History: 1982-present
- Publisher: Lippincott Williams & Wilkins (United States)
- Frequency: Bimonthly
- Impact factor: 0.988 (5-yr 1.226) (2021)

Standard abbreviations
- ISO 4: Orthop. Nurs.

Indexing
- ISSN: 0744-6020 (print); 1542-538X (web)
- OCLC no.: 8424301

Links
- Journal homepage; Online access; Online archive

Orthopaedic Nursing is the bimonthly peer-reviewed nursing journal of orthopaedic nursing. It is published by Lippincott Williams & Wilkins. It contains information on current events, organizational activities, research, product and drug information, and literature findings. Articles focus on professional development and clinical, administrative, academic, and research areas of orthopaedics. The journal also provides continuing education content and is the official journal of the National Association of Orthopaedic Nurses.

According to the Journal Citation Reports, the journal has a 2016 impact factor of 0.375.

== See also ==
- Journal of Orthopaedic Nursing
- List of nursing journals
