= Grayce Sills =

American nurse, educator, and author

Grayce Sills (April 18, 1926 – 2016) was an American psychiatric nurse, educator, author, and nurse administrator. Sills was the co-founder of the American Psychiatric Nurses Association, She was co-founding editor of the Journal of the American Psychiatric Nurses Association (JAPNA).

== Early life and education ==
Sills was born on April 18, 1926; the youngest of four siblings. After she was orphaned she was raised by her grandparents and other family members in Bremen, Ohio.

Sills graduated from Rockland State Hospital School of Nursing in 1950. She then enrolled in Teachers College, Columbia University in 1950. She earned a bachelor's degree from the University of Dayton, and a Master's and Doctorate in sociology from The Ohio State University.

== Nursing career ==
=== Psychiatric and mental health nursing ===
After graduating from The Ohio State University (OSU.) Sills joined the faculty at the Ohio State University School of Nursing in 1964 and began her career as a psychiatric nurse. She remained a member of the faculty until her retirement in 1993.

=== Nurse administrator ===
Sills developed the graduate level clinical nurse specialist program in psychiatry at OSU. She was Chair of the Department of Family and Community Nursing and Director of Graduate Studies. Sills worked to achieve salary equality for the nursing facility with other disciplines at OSU.

=== Editor ===
In 1995 Sills co-founded the Journal of the American Psychiatric Nurses Association (JAPNA) with Nikki Polis and was the first editor. She served as editor for eleven years.

=== National leadership roles ===
Sills was a founding member of the American Nurses Association Commission on Human Rights and served on the commission for twelve years. She advocated for diversity and human rights in the professional practice of nursing.

She was elected to the American Academy of Nursing in 1976 and served two terms on its Governing Council.

== Honors and legacy ==
Sills was designated as an AAN Living Legend in 1999. She received several other awards, including the ANA Hildegard Peplau Award.
