= Journal of Orthopaedic Nursing =

- Discipline: Nursing
- Language: English

Publication details
- History: 1997-present
- Publisher: Elsevier
- Frequency: Quarterly

Standard abbreviations
- ISO 4: J. Orthop. Nurs.

Indexing
- ISSN: 1361-3111
- OCLC no.: 42727280

Links
- Journal homepage; Online access; Online archive

The Journal of Orthopaedic Nursing was a quarterly peer-reviewed healthcare journal of orthopaedic nursing. It is published by Elsevier and contains practical and theoretical guidance for trainees and professionals including papers and comments, editorial comments, book and policy reviews, and announcements of events. The journal also provides continuing medical education content.

It is the official journal of the RCN Society of Orthopaedic and Trauma Nursing and the Canadian Orthopaedic Nurses Association. It is indexed in CINAHL and VINITI.

From 2009 this journal continued as the International Journal of Orthopaedic and Trauma Nursing by Elsevier.

== See also ==
- Orthopaedic Nursing
- List of nursing journals
