= National Association of Orthopaedic Nurses =

U.S. professional organization

The National Association of Orthopaedic Nurses (NAON) is an American non-profit volunteer-run professional association that aims to advance orthopaedic nursing. Formed in 1980, NAON was designed to promote the highest standards of nursing practice by educating its practitioners, promoting research, and encouraging effective communication between orthopaedic nurses and other groups with similar interests.

NAON membership consists of more than 6,000 registered nurses, licensed practical nurses, student nurses, and associate members from across the United States and around the world who share an interest in musculoskeletal health care.

NAON is accredited as a provider of continuing nursing education by the American Nurses Credentialing Center's Commission on Accreditation. Starting in 1981, NAON has organized an annual congress at different locations in the United States.

== History ==
One of the main goals of the founders of NAON was to form a stronger and firmer foundation for the development of an orthopaedic nursing organization. Recovering from the unexpected dissolution of the previous organization, Orthopaedic Nurses Association (ONA), members from across the United States met on March 8, 1980, in Atlanta, Georgia, under the leadership of Nancy Hesselbach and Barbara Fiehler. This meeting was convened during the annual meeting of the American Academy of Orthopaedic Surgeons. Subsequently, NAON was established and incorporated in Missouri on April 14, 1980.

== Publications ==
NAON publishes:

- Orthopaedic Nursing, a peer-reviewed nursing journal
- NAON News
- Core Curriculum for Orthopaedic Nursing

== Foundation ==
The NAON Foundation supports the goals and mission of NAON by providing grants, scholarships, and awards to nurses pursuing careers in orthopaedic nursing practice, education, administration, and research.
