= Flight Nurse Badge =

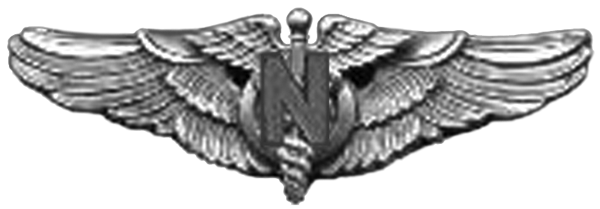
Army Air Force Flight Nurse Badge (WW II)

Air Force Flight Nurse Badge

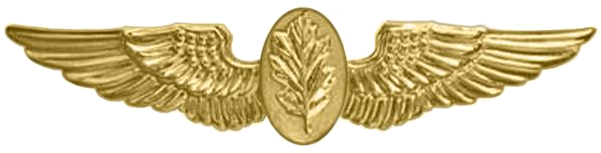
Navy Flight Nurse Insignia

The Flight Nurse Badge is a military badge of the United States armed forces which is issued by the U.S. Air Force and United States Navy to flight nurses. Versions of this badge have existed since World War II, when the decoration was first created as the Army Air Forces Flight Nurse Badge.

The Flight Nurse Badge is issued in two different versions, one for the Navy and the other for the Air Force. To be awarded the Flight Nurse Badge, a service member must be a commissioned officer and a Registered Nurse and must also complete training normally befitting the award of the Aircrew Badge. Upon completion of prerequisite training, a service member must complete advanced studies in Aerospace Medicine and be qualified as a military flight nurse. The Flight Nurse Badge is then presented after a probationary period of in-flight instruction and observation.

The Air Force version of the Flight Nurse Badge is issued in three degrees: Basic, Senior, and Master. The Basic Flight Nurse Badge is awarded upon completion of all training and qualification as a flight nurse. The Senior and Master versions of the Flight Nurse Badge are awarded based on years of service in the Air Force and number of flight hours obtained. The different degrees of the Flight Nurse Badge are denoted by a star (Senior level) or a star with wreath (Master level) centered above the decoration.

The United States Navy issues the Flight Nurse Badge in a single degree. None of the other military branches maintains an equivalent to the Flight Nurse Badge. The decoration is similar to the Flight Surgeon Badge.

== See also ==
- Badges of the United States Air Force
- Badges of the United States Navy
- Flight nurse
- Obsolete badges of the United States military
- Military badges of the United States
