= Mobile Intensive Care Nurse =

A Critical Care Transport Nurse is a Registered Nurse specialized in care in the pre-hospital setting. These are mostly air-medical personnel or critical care transport providers with specialized training and experience in pre-hospital care. Such nurses are required by their employers to seek additional certifications beyond basic nursing licensure and are often required to have three years (minimum) of full-time experience in emergency and/or intensive care.

== Requirements ==
Certification requirements vary but often include advanced cardiac life support (ACLS), basic life support (BLS), pediatric advanced life support (PALS), neonatal resuscitation program (NRP), trauma nursing core course (TNCC), and Advanced Trauma Life Support (ATLS), in addition to Pre-Hospital Trauma Life Support (PHTLS). Standards also include being board certified in Emergency Nursing (CEN), Critical Care Nursing (CCRN), and Ground Transport (CTRN) or Flight Nursing (CFRN) respectively.

In some regions these nurses are authorized to operate base station phones for medical command. Some states allow them to operate entirely under standing orders while on a ground ambulance or air medical unit (i.e. offline medical control). Training also includes specific education relevant to the state and its protocols, and often requires the nurse to train with paramedics for a period of time as well as taking an additional exam administered by their medical director before being allowed to operate on a ground ambulance or air medical unit. Many of these nurses hold certifications as Emergency Medical Technicians or Paramedics, and in some states are required to, but it is not the standard of practice.
