= Clinician =

Health care professional

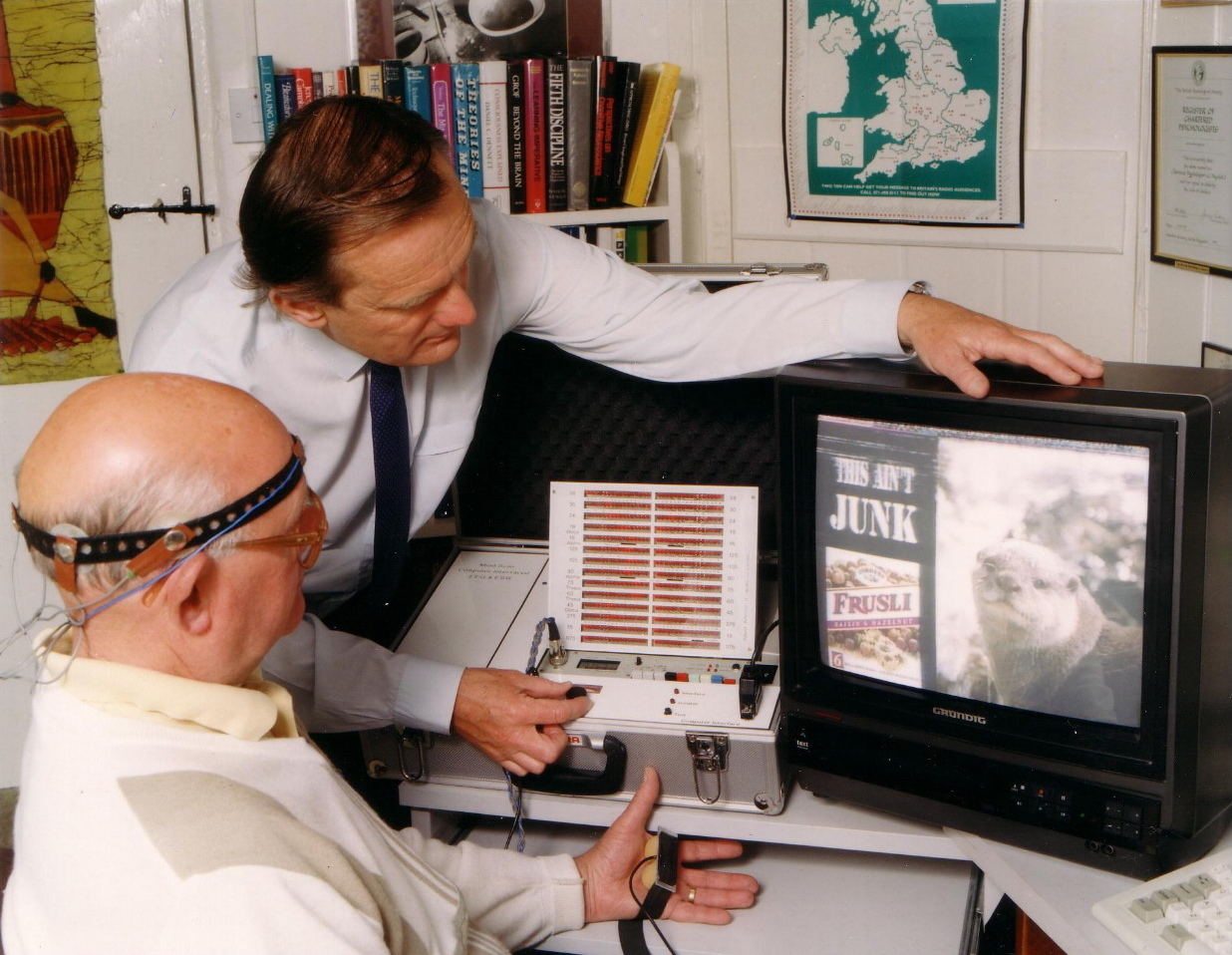
A psychologist, David Lewis, in the 1980s. Psychologists are clinicians.

A clinician is a health care professional typically employed at a skilled nursing facility or clinic. Clinicians work directly with patients rather than in a laboratory, community health setting or in research. A clinician may diagnose, treat and care for patients as a psychologist, clinical pharmacist, clinical scientist, nurse, occupational therapist, speech-language pathologist, physiotherapist, dentist, optometrist, physician assistant, clinical officer, physician, paramedic, or chaplain. Clinicians undergo and take comprehensive training and exams to be licensed and some complete graduate degrees (master's or doctorates) in their field of expertise.

The main function of a clinician is to manage a sick person in order to cure their illness, reduce pain and suffering, and extend life considering the impact of illness upon the patient and their family as well as other social factors.

== See also ==
- List of healthcare occupations
