= Journal of the American Psychiatric Nurses Association =

- Discipline: Psychiatry
- Language: English
- Edited by: Karen Farchaus Stein

Publication details
- History: 1995 -present
- Publisher: SAGE Publications
- Frequency: Bi-monthly
- Impact factor: (2010)

Standard abbreviations
- ISO 4: J. Am. Psychiatr. Nurses Assoc.

Indexing
- ISSN: 1078-3903
- OCLC no.: 300825130

Links
- Journal homepage; Online access; Online archive

Journal of the American Psychiatric Nurses Association is a peer-reviewed academic journal that publishes papers six times a year in the field of Psychiatry. The journal's editor is Karen Farchaus Stein (University of Rochester). It has been in publication since 1995 and is currently published by SAGE Publications in association with American Psychiatric Nurses Association.

== Scope ==
Journal of the American Psychiatric Nurses Association publishes up-to-date information, aiming to improve mental health care for culturally diverse individuals and shape health care policy for the delivery of mental health services. The journal publishes both clinical and research articles relevant to psychiatric nursing.

== Abstracting and indexing ==
Journal of the American Psychiatric Nurses Association is abstracted and indexed in the following databases:

- CINAHL
- EBSCO
- MEDLINE
- Ovid
- PsycINFO
- SCOPUS
