= Registered nurse certified in maternal newborn nursing =

In the United States, a registered nurse certified in maternal newborn nursing (RNC-MNN) is a obstetrical nurse who has earned a nursing board certification from the National Certification Corporation in maternal/newborn nursing.

== See also ==
- List of nursing credentials
