= Orthopaedic Nurse Certified =

Orthopaedic Nurse, Certified (ONC) is the designation for an orthopaedic nurse who has earned nursing board certification from the Orthopaedic Nurses Certification Board (ONCB)

== Job description ==
ONBC supports the advancement of health of orthopaedic patients by administering a certificate to the Orthopaedic nurse that improves their knowledge and practice to support patients with orthopaedic conditions or injuries.

An Orthopaedic nurse is responsible for assessing new patients, monitoring the condition of their current patients, and providing treatments and medication. As part of this role, the nurse also monitors vital signs, assess the surgical sight, provide dressing changes, and notifies the doctor of any changes in the patient's condition. Finally, the Orthopaedic nurse also performs general nursing techniques, such as changing bedpans, assisting the patient with ambulation, maintaining care plans, providing IV medication, and informing and supporting the patient and their families.

The optimal goal for the Orthopaedic nurse is to keep the patient comfortable, which may require turning the patient and providing pain relievers as needed.

== Exam and certification ==
The Orthopaedic certification exam contains 150 questions, 135 of which are scored while the other 15 do not affect the test score. 97/135 is needed to pass the exam. Results are hosted by AMP, which is ONCB's test vendor. The ONCB then distributes the results directly to the new certified holder. The ONCB does not distribute the results to individual agencies. The exam is usually given in the Fall and Spring and is offered around the United States. To take the certification exam the nurse has to be licensed and have at least 2 years experience but doesn't need a bachelor's degree. Nurses must have 1000 hours of Orthopaedic patient care within the last 3 years. Certification lasts for 5 years, after which recertification or continuing education is required.

== Recertification ==
Recertification in Orthopeadic Nursing requires 1000 practice hours logged in an applicant's past 5 years and 100 hours of education: 70 hours in Orthopaedics and 30 hours in general nursing. The application can take 8 weeks to process. Paper applications should be mailed with a return receipt.

== See also ==
- List of nursing credentials
