= Orthopaedic nursing =

Nursing for musculoskeletal disorders

Orthopaedic nursing (or orthopedic nursing) is a nursing specialty focused on the prevention and treatment of musculoskeletal disorders. Orthopaedic issues range from acute problems such as fractures or hospitalization for joint replacement to chronic systemic disorders such as loss of bone density or lupus erythematosus.

Orthopaedic nurses have specialized skills such as neurovascular status monitoring, traction, continuous passive motion therapy, casting, and care of patients with external fixation.

== Board certification ==
Certification in general orthopaedic nursing results in the designation "Orthopaedic Nurse Certified" (ONC).

== Dates ==
- International Orthopaedic Nurses Day is October 30.
- Osteoporosis Awareness and Prevention Month is May.

== See also ==
- Agnes Hunt, the pioneer of orthopaedic nursing
- National Association of Orthopaedic Nurses
- Journal of Orthopaedic Nursing
- Orthopaedic Nursing (journal)
