= Rural and isolated practice registered nurse =

Rural and isolated practice registered nurse (RIPRN), also rural and isolated practice endorsed registered nurse (RIPERN), is an endorsement for registered nurses practising in rural, isolated and remote areas in Australia. Such nurses hold the post-nominal RIPRN.

The program of study is delivered at a post-graduate certificate or diploma level, and is recognised by the Australian Health Practitioner's Registration Authority (AHPRA) as "scheduled medicines endorsement (rural and isolated practice)". The only other endorsement recognised for nurses by AHPRA is that of a midwife.

Once endorsed as RIPRN, nurses in may initiate the administration and supply of certain restricted and controlled drugs, or scheduled medicines (that normally require a prescription) under a drug therapy protocol (DTP). The DTP requires that clinical guidelines around the use of the medicines are in place - called health management protocols (HMP). In Queensland the HMPs are contained within the statewide Primary Clinical Care Manual (PCCM). The PCCM is updated in line with Cochrane Library data and other evidence-based medicine sources every two years to remain current.

If completing the course through Queensland Health as the education provider, the program includes written and practical assessment over an 11-month period of time. Otherwise by Graduate Diploma through a University, the courses usually take 12 months.

== Course content ==
Content of the program includes:

- Legislation and context of practice
- Pharmacology
- Clinical skills assessments
- Immunisation for nurses
- Primary health care case studies
