= Registered nurse certified in low-risk neonatal nursing =

In the United States, a registered nurse certified in low-risk neonatal nursing (RNC-LRN) is a neonatal nurse who has earned nursing board certification from the National Certification Corporation in low-risk neonatal nursing.

== See also ==
- List of nursing credentials
