= Registered psychiatric nurse =

Healthcare professional

In Canada, a registered psychiatric nurse (RPN) is a nurse who specialises in holistic care of clients with complex mental health, addictions, and physical needs.They compose a distinct nursing profession, practicing across all the Canadian provinces and territories. A RPN completes specialized psychiatric nursing education through an approved post-secondary program and demonstrates the national competencies and standards of practice set by the Registered Psychiatric Nurse Regulators of Canada (RPNRC).

While RPNs are also trained in foundational nursing and medical-surgical nursing, psychiatric nursing education is distinct from other programs, according to the RPNRC, in its “breadth, depth and focus” on advanced knowledge and skills in mental health and addictions nursing. They are also autonomous professionals that work in all areas of mental health and addictions, including direct nursing care, education, administration, and research. Their role also encompasses integrated mental and physical health care to individuals, families, and communities across the lifespan.

== History ==
At the beginning of the 20th century care for psychiatric patients in Canada was performed in asylums. It was typical across the country that care was provided by the untrained attendants under the structure control of psychiatrists and other administrative leadership. While provinces such as Ontario opted in the 1930s to cross-train psychiatric and generalist nurses, this integrated approach to nursing education was never adopted by the western provinces. For the provinces of British Columbia, Alberta, Saskatchewan, Manitoba, and the territories of the Yukon, Nunavut, and Northwest Territories psychiatric nursing training remained separate. Entry-to-practice psychiatric nursing education have been offered as diploma or bachelor degrees.

This was highly influenced by the 20th century Riverview psychiatric institution in British Columbia.The mental hospital aimed to professionalize and specialize psychiatric nursing care in the region by providing formal, on-the-job training to institution attendants and aides. From 1930 to 1972 Riverview was the home of the British Columbia School of Psychiatric Nursing. The B.C. School of Psychiatric Nursing was moved to the B.C. Institute of Technology (BCIT) in 1972. Since 1984 Douglas College has overseen the program as B.C.’s primary psychiatric nursing program.

As psychiatric nursing education has evolved, in 2010 Brandon University established Canada’s only Masters of Psychiatric Nursing (MPN) program.The MPN program provides education for professionals entering clinical, administrative, or education advanced practice positions.

The RPNRC is a national canadian organization made up of regulators from each province and territory in which RPNs practice.They function to bring together individual regulators to support and advance regulatory processes of RPNs in Canada. According to the RPNRC, as of 2026 there are now over 6,000 RPNs across Canada.

== Education ==
A prospective registered psychiatric nurse (RPN) must complete one of the eight approved diploma or bachelor of psychiatric nursing degree programs available in western Canada. RPNs are regulated nursing professionals in the provinces of British Columbia, Alberta, Saskatchewan, Manitoba, and territories of Yukon, Northwest Territories and Nunavut. Regardless of degree type, all psychiatric nursing education includes study of the biological sciences, psychology, ethics, and pharmacology, in addition to clinical training. New graduates then write the RPNCE exam, a national competency-based test of psychiatric nursing standards set by the Registered Psychiatric Nurse Regulators of Canada (RPNRC). Once successfully passed, graduates can become licensed with their provincial or territorial regulatory body to start working as a RPN.

== See also ==
- Mental health nursing
- Psychiatric-mental health nurse practitioner (United States)
