= Orthopaedic physician's assistant =

The Orthopaedic (also spelled orthopedic) Physician Assistant (OPA-C) is a professional physician extender (also termed "mid-level") who has met the criteria set forth by the National Board for Certification of Orthopaedic Physician Assistants and has passed a certification examination, and maintains certification by complying with the regulations of the National Board for Certification of Orthopaedic Physician Assistants. This profession is not to be confused with physician assistants which are a separate and distinct provider.
