= Women's health nurse practitioner =

Type of US certified nurse practitioner

Occupation
- Occupation type: profession
- Activity sectors: healthcare, advanced practice registered nurse

Description
- Education required: Master's degree or Doctorate degree
- Related jobs: nurse midwife, nurse anesthetist, clinical nurse specialist

A women's health nurse practitioner (WHNP) is a nurse practitioner that specializes in continuing and comprehensive healthcare for women across the lifespan with emphasis on conditions unique to women from menarche through the remainder of their life cycle.

== Education and board certification ==
Following educational preparation at the master's or doctoral level, WHNPs must become board certified by an approved certification body. Board certification must be maintained by obtaining continuing nursing education credits. In the US, board certification is provided through the National Certification Corporation (awards the Women's Health Care Nurse Practitioner-Board Certified [WHNP-BC] credential).

== Scope of practice ==
WHNPs deliver a range of acute, chronic, and preventive healthcare services:

- Obtaining a relevant health history, including a comprehensive obstetric and gynecologic history, with emphasis on gender-based differences.
- Performing a complete, system, or symptom-directed physical examinations on women, including obstetric and gynecologic conditions/needs that include, pregnancy, benign and malignant gynecologic conditions, contraception, sexually transmitted infections, infertility, perimenopause/menopause/postmenopause and other gender-specific illnesses.
- Assessing, diagnosing, and treating for maternal and fetal well-being, high-risk pregnancies, depression, and pregnancy/postpartum complications.
- Assessing, diagnosing, and treating disease risk factors specific to women.
- Distinguishing female gender differences in presentation and progression of health problems and responses to pharmacological agents and other therapies.
- Assessing social and physical environmental health risks, including teratogens, that impact childbearing.
- Assessing for evidence of intimate partner violence, sexual abuse, and substance abuse.
- Assessing, diagnosing, and treating issues related to sexuality.
- Assessing parental behavior and skills and promotes smooth transition to role changes.
- Assessing, diagnosing, and treating selected reproductive health needs or problems in male partners, such as sexually transmitted infections, contraception, and infertility.
- Assessing genetic risks and refers, as needed, for testing and counseling.
- Collaborating with other health care providers for management or referral of high-risk pregnancies.
- Performing primary care procedures, including pap smears, microscopy, post-coital tests, intrauterine device (IUD) insertion, and endometrial biopsies.
- Providing management and education for women and men in need of family planning and fertility control.

== See also ==
- Advanced practice registered nurse
- Women's health
