= Neonatal nurse practitioner =

Type of certified nurse practitioner

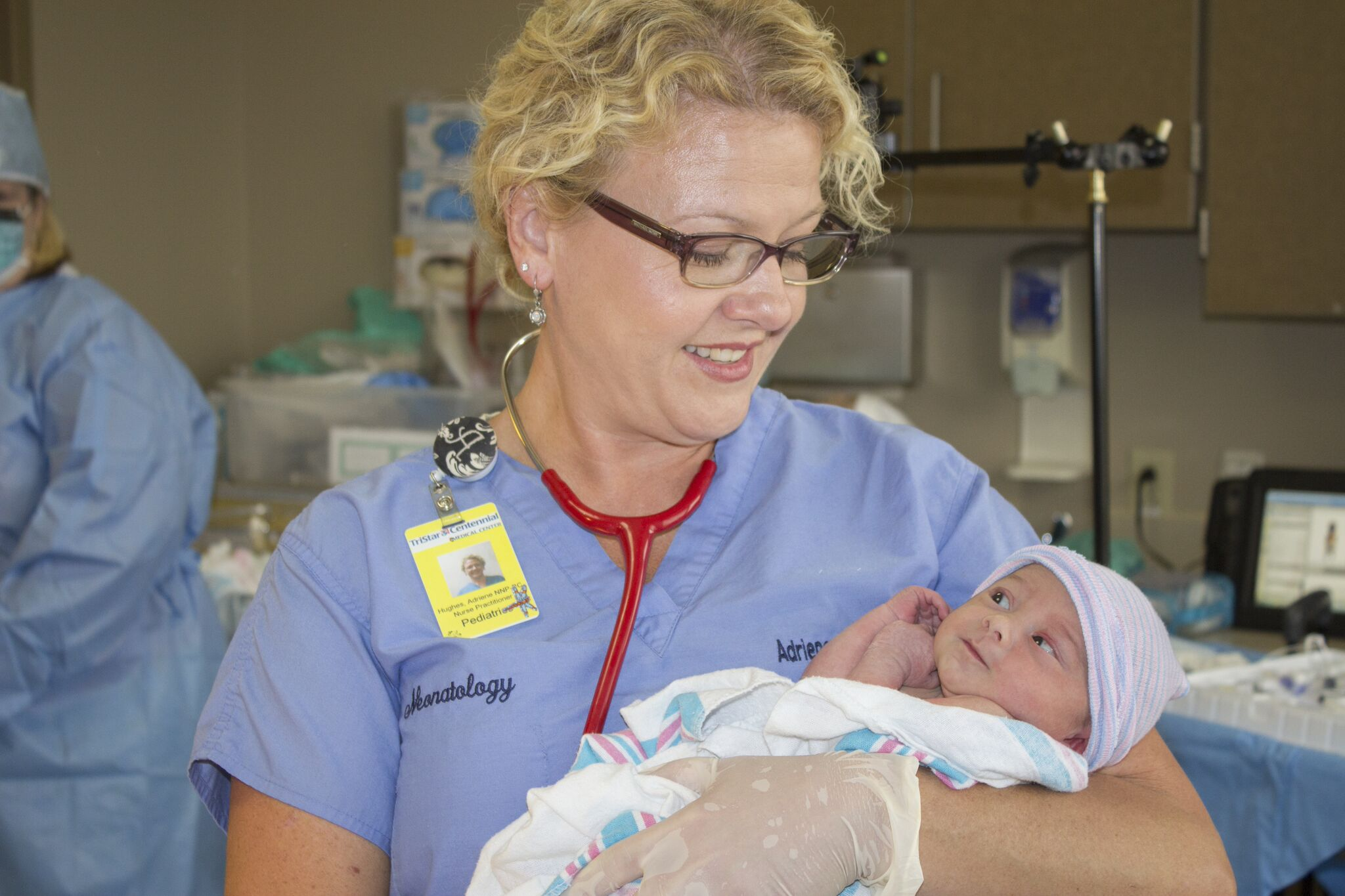
- An NNP caring for a newborn at a high risk delivery

Occupation
- Occupation type: Professional
- Activity sectors: Healthcare, advanced practice registered nurse

Description
- Education required: Master's degree or Doctorate degree
- Related jobs: nurse midwife, nurse anesthetist, clinical nurse specialist

A neonatal nurse practitioner (NNP) is an advanced practice registered nurse (APRN) with at least 2 years experience as a bedside registered nurse in a Level III NICU, who is prepared to practice across the continuum, providing primary, acute, chronic, and critical care to neonates, infants, and toddlers through age 2. Primarily working in neonatal intensive care unit (NICU) settings, NNPs select and perform clinically indicated advanced diagnostic and therapeutic invasive procedures. In the United States, a board certified neonatal nurse practitioner (NNP-BC) is an APRN who has acquired graduate education at the master's or doctoral level and has a board certification in neonatology. The National Association of Neonatal Nurse Practitioners] (NANNP) is the national association that represents neonatal nurse practitioners in the United States. Certification is governed by the National Certification Corporation for Obstetrics, Gynecologic and Neonatal Nursing Specialties (NCC).

== History ==
The first modern day NICU opened in 1960 at Yale-New Haven Hospital under the auspices of Louis Gluck, a pioneer in the emerging pediatric specialty, neonatology. Gluck's NICU concept demonstrated improved outcomes of sick and preterm infants and led to the emergence of NICUs across the country by the late 1960s. Most NICUs were located in large, university settings with patient management provided by medical interns and residents supervised by a neonatologist. To meet the needs of this vulnerable population, nursing roles expanded to include tasks previously relegated to physicians, such as initiating intravenous access and phlebotomy.

In 1965, the first nurse practitioner program in the United States was developed at the University of Colorado to prepare pediatric nurse practitioners for primary care. By the 1970s, neonatal intensive care was an integrated medical service in many large teaching hospitals across the country, providing successful management of the preterm and sick newborn and reducing the neonatal mortality rate. Neonatal transport services were established to move newborns from their birth facility to the nearest NICU, enabling expansion of the NICU nursing role as nurses filled these new positions. Guidelines published by the American Nurses Association (ANA) in 1975 set the NNP program standards until NANN published Education Standards and Guidelines for NNP Programs in 2002. These ANA standards led to the proliferation of hospital-based, certificate programs to train nurses as NNPs.

National certification for NNPs began in 1983 by the NAACOG Certification Corporation, now the National Certification Corporation (NCC) for Obstetrics, Gynecologic and Neonatal Nursing Specialties (NCC). NANN was established in 1984, providing support to foster the neonatal advanced practice nursing movement.

In the 1990s, states began requiring national certification or master's degree as entry into practice for the NNP. In the early 2000s, nurse practitioners lobbied for prescribing privileges to make their provider status fully operational. In 2007, a division of the National Association of Neonatal Nurses (NANN), was founded as the only national association dedicated solely to NNPs.

Today, neonatal APRNs are recognized as professional providers, and they have become an integral part of the neonatal health team at all levels of care. Fifty-two states and jurisdictions already require advanced certification for APRNs.

== Education ==
To take the first step at becoming a neonatal nurse practitioner, a registered nurse (RN) must achieve a Bachelor of Science in Nursing degree (BSN). Before an application can be submitted for a Master's or Doctoral degree, at least two years of experience in a neonatal care unit is needed. When applying for a Master's or Doctoral degree, it needs to be from an accredited nursing school with a specialty in neonatology. These programs can take about two to three years. The classes that will be taken will be focused on neonatology, while there will also be a variety of core classes. After completing the program, it is required to apply to take the NNP exam through the National Certification Corporation (NCC) for national certification. Once passing this exam, there is another exam that must be passed for state certification. These certifications need to be renewed every few years for the continuing practice of being a NNP.

== Board Certification ==
Following educational preparation at the master's or doctoral level, most states require NNPs to be board certified by an approved certification body. Board certification must be maintained by obtaining continuing nursing education credits. In the US, board certification is provided through the National Certification Corporation (awards the NNP-BC credential). The exam for the certification consists of 175 questions and a three-hour time limit. These questions cover topics related to pharmacology, general management, a general assessment, professional issues, and a majority of the content is on embryology, physiology, pathophysiology, and systems management.

== Scope of practice ==
The neonatal nurse practitioner provides specialized care for newborns with a wide range of acuity (level of illness) and conditions from prematurity, infections, genetic conditions, heart disease, surgical diagnoses, respiratory problems, and other disorders. NNPs primarily work in the hospital setting in well-baby nurseries, special care nurseries, neonatal intensive care units and the delivery room. Neonatal nurse practitioners can also work in office settings or private practices. Their specialized training allows them to provide individualized care to infants from the moment of delivery and from well babies to critically ill newborns. NNPs typically work in collaboration with Neonatologists and/or Pediatricians but (in most states) are licensed, independent providers who can diagnose and treat patients. NNPs have prescriptive authority and can prescribe medications as needed for the neonatal population (in most states). Hours for neonatal nurse practitioners can vary a great deal. They typically work 40-hour weeks but might have to pick up overtime depending on the status of the patients and if there is another nurse to take over. The shifts can be five eight-hour shifts a week, four ten-hour shifts, or 3 twelve-hour shifts. Neonatal nurse practitioners can also have the possibility of working holidays.

== Day to day duties ==
Neonatal nurse practitioners (NNPs) work with newborns daily. NNPs take vital signs and monitor the newborns very closely since their conditions can deteriorate quickly. Neonatal nurse practitioners perform, order, and analyze tests on the newborn. NNPs also create treatment plans and support the parents of the infant. Neonatal nurse practitioners need to be physically fit. This is vital as they stay on their feet for long hours constantly moving around and acting fast in emergencies. Additionally, NNPs must maintain composure in emergency situations in order to respond to the situation effectively.

== Salary ==
Neonatal nurse practitioner's salary is dependent on where the location of the job is and the demand for it in the area. People with less experience make less than people with decades of experience. Education, skills, and certifications can also play a significant role in what salary is paid. As of 2022, the average salary ranges between $109,000 to $150,000 in the United States.

== Workforce ==
In this field of work, there is an estimated job growth of 26% to 28% from the years 2018 to 2028. This increase in job growth will be able to provide 26,000 jobs. There is a very high demand for neonatal nurse practitioners. According to the data from 2020 from the National Certification Corporation (NCC), neonatal nurse practitioners make up about 2% of the 325,000 licensed nurse practitioners. Most neonatal nurse practitioners in the workforce are female. Over the years, the majority of neonatal nurse practitioners' race and ethnicity were white then second to that was Asian ethnicity. The average age for NNP is forty years old.

== See also ==
- Advanced practice registered nurse
- Neonatology
- Neonatal Nurse Practitioner-Board Certified
