= American Psychiatric Nurses Association =

The American Psychiatric Nurses Association (APNA) is a professional association of psychiatric-mental health nurses. Founded in 1986, it provides continuing education and a range of professional services to a membership of more than 15000 nurses. It publishes position papers on mental health issues and the care of persons with psychiatric disorders.

== Membership ==
APNA is the largest psychiatric-mental health nursing organization, with more than 40 national and international chapters. Educational levels vary from basic to doctoral. The membership includes psychiatric registered nurses, advanced practice registered nurses, nursing students, licensed practical nurses, and retired nurses.

== Publications ==
APNA has an electronic newsletter entitled APNA News: The Psychiatric Nursing Voice that is emailed to all members monthly. The Journal of the American Psychiatric Nurses Association (JAPNA) is published bimonthly by SAGE Publications. APNA membership includes a subscription JAPNA. Members may also access JAPNA online. It includes peer-reviewed articles regarding psychiatric and mental health nursing, improving mental health care, and health care policy. APNA also co-published Psychiatric-Mental Health: Scope and Standards of Practice with the American Nurses Association and International Society of Psychiatric-Mental Health Nurses.

== Continuing nursing education ==
APNA is an accredited provider of continuing nursing education by the American Nurses Credentialing Center's Commission on Accreditation. The organization offers live and online continuing nursing education programs.

The APNA Annual Conference is the largest gathering of psychiatric and mental health nurses in the US and consists of three days of continuing education specific to psychiatric mental health nursing.

The APNA Annual Clinical Psychopharmacology Institute offers sessions which provide psychopharmacology continuing education contact hours related to psychiatric medications. This institute addresses the interaction of neurobiological and genetic mechanisms, Axis I and II disorders and clinical syndromes, and current health care issues in recovery including transcultural care delivery. Complex health issues, polypharmacy, and recently approved medications are also addressed.

APNA worked collaboratively with the National Association of Pediatric Nurse Practitioners on a three part series, Counseling Points - Caring for Patients with ADHD Throughout the Lifespan. APNA is developing a three part series of Counseling Points on tobacco dependence entitled "Breaking Barriers and Implementing Change".

== See also ==
- Grayce Sills
