= Seminars in Perinatology =

- Discipline: Perinatology
- Language: English
- Edited by: Mary E. D' Alton, Ian Gross

Publication details
- History: 1977-present
- Publisher: Elsevier
- Frequency: Bimonthly
- Impact factor: 2.682 (2014)

Standard abbreviations
- ISO 4: Semin. Perinatol.

Indexing
- CODEN: SEMPDU
- ISSN: 0146-0005 (print); 1558-075X (web)

Links
- Journal homepage; Online access; Online archive

Seminars in Perinatology is a bimonthly peer-reviewed medical journal covering perinatology. It was established in 1977 and is published by Elsevier. The editors-in-chief are Ian Gross (Yale School of Medicine) and Mary E. D'alton (Columbia University Medical Center). According to the Journal Citation Reports, the journal has a 2014 impact factor of 2.682.
