= Flight Surgeon Badge (United States) =

Military badge of the US Armed Forces

US Army Basic Flight Surgeon Badge
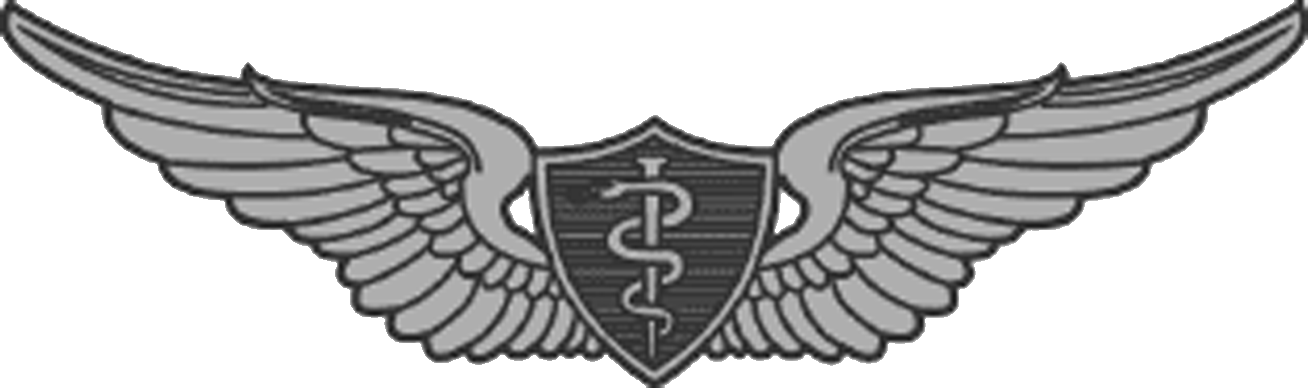
- Type: Badge
- Presented by: United States Army
- Eligibility: Members of the United States Army who are both qualified medical officers and certified flight surgeons
- Status: Currently awarded
- Established: World War II
- First award: World War II

Army Precedence
- Next (higher): Astronaut Device
- Next (lower): Diver Badges

US Air Force Basic Flight Surgeon Badge
- Type: Badge
- Presented by: United States Air Force
- Eligibility: Members of the United States Air Force who are both qualified medical officers and certified flight surgeons
- Status: Currently awarded
- Established: World War II
- First award: World War II

Air Force Precedence
- Next (higher): Chaplain Badges
- Equivalent: (Group 1 badges); Astronaut - Aviator - Flight Surgeon - Flight Nurse - Aircrew - Space Operations Badge - Cyberspace Operator Badge
- Next (lower): (Group 2 badges); Parachutist

The Flight Surgeon Badge is a military badge of the United States Armed Forces which has existed to designate Flight Surgeons since the Second World War.

The Flight Surgeon Badge is worn by those members of the military who have completed the individual service requirements for award of the badge. The original Flight Surgeon Badges were awarded by both the Army and Navy during World War II. After WW II, when the USAF became a separate service, they retained the Army Air Force badge, but redesigned it with a smaller rod of Asclepius over the central shield (the present pattern). Concurrently, the Army badge was redesigned to the present pattern (along with all other Army Aviation badges).

The Naval Flight Surgeon insignia has gone through several design iterations from the pre-World War II period, to during World War II, to the postwar period and present day. There is no separate Marine Corps Flight Surgeon insignia, as all medical personnel assigned to or supporting Marine Corps units are Navy personnel, and will thus be awarded and wear Navy insignia.

The Coast Guard Flight Surgeon Badge is the same pattern as the USCG Aviator badge, but with a caduceus superimposed over the central shield. Unlike USN and USN medical support of USMC, USCG Flight Surgeons are commissioned corps officers of the U.S. Public Health Service.

To be awarded the Army Basic Flight Surgeon Badge, a service member must be a commissioned officer who is either a physician, Physician Assistant, or ANP (the latter two as of 2011 per Army Regulation 600-8-22) and successfully complete the Army Flight Surgeon Primary Course (AFSPC) at Fort Novosel, Alabama. The AFSPC is a six-week course that includes topics in aviation physiology, Army aviation and aviation medicine regulations, accident investigation, military aviation operations, and aircraft orientations; for several years in the 1980s flight surgeon candidates received actual flight training up to, and including, solo flight in the TH-55 helicopter. A physician who has completed the AFSPC may later elect to apply for the Army Residency in Aerospace Medicine, although some highly qualified fourth year medical students may be selected to enter the program upon graduation.

The Naval Flight Surgeon is conducted at the Naval Aerospace Medical Institute at NAS Pensacola, Florida. Its curriculum is similar to the Army program, but is 24 weeks in length and includes 10 weeks of flight indoctrination training in the T-6 Texan II, T-45 Goshawk and TH-57 SeaRanger.

The Air Force program consists of three phases, Aerospace Medicine Primary 101, 201, and 202. The Air Force program, in addition to a core curriculum similar to the Army and Navy, includes such topics as Bioenvironmental Engineering and occupational health.

Coast Guard flight surgeons generally attend the Army course followed by a two-week USCG transition course.

The Army, Navy, and Air Force also offer residency programs in Aerospace Medicine, located at Fort Novosel, AL, NAS Pensacola, and Wright-Patterson AFB, respectively.

The United States Army and United States Air Force issue the Flight Surgeon Badge in three ratings: Basic, Senior, and Master (Army)/Chief (Air Force). The Basic Flight Surgeon Badge is presented upon completion of initial flight surgeon qualifications, while the Senior and Master versions of the badge are presented based on years of service and number of flight hours performed as a flight surgeon. Per Army Regulation 600-105, the Army Senior Flight Surgeon Badge may be awarded after five years of duty as a flight surgeon (three if two years were as an Army Aviator) and 400 flight hours, while the Master version may be awarded after ten years of service as a flight surgeon, 850 flight hours, and board certification in Aerospace Medicine. The Senior Flight Surgeon badge is denoted by a star centered above the badge, while the Master and Chief Flight Surgeon badges display a star and wreath (Army) or star and scroll (USAF). USAF requirements for Senior and Chief badges are similar to the Army requirements. The United States Navy and Coast Guard issue Flight Surgeon Badges in a single degree.

In addition to the Flight Surgeon Badge, the United States Navy and Air Force award the Flight Nurse Badge for those nurses qualified in aerospace medicine and in-flight operations. A flight medical specialty badge, the Aviation Psychologist Badge, is an additional decoration awarded by the U.S. Navy. Army psychologists who will serve with, or otherwise support, Army Aviation personnel may be selected to attend the AFSPC, however they may only be awarded the Basic Aircrew Badge upon completion of other requirements for that badge.

== See also ==
- Obsolete badges of the United States military
