= Community psychiatric nurse =

Medical profession

In the United Kingdom a community psychiatric nurse is a psychiatric nurse based in the community rather than a psychiatric hospital. They form an integral part of community mental health teams. They are often patients' key workers within the NHS mental health system and are often the first port of call for further referrals to psychiatrists, psychotherapists and other mental health professionals. Community psychiatric nurses mainly visit people in their own homes but they also see people in other settings such as GP surgeries or the community mental health team base.

They also work with the police.

== See also ==
- Assertive community treatment
- Care in the Community
- Case management (mental health)
- Community Mental Health Team
- Deinstitutionalisation
