= Flight nurse =

Specialist in rescue/evacuation patient care

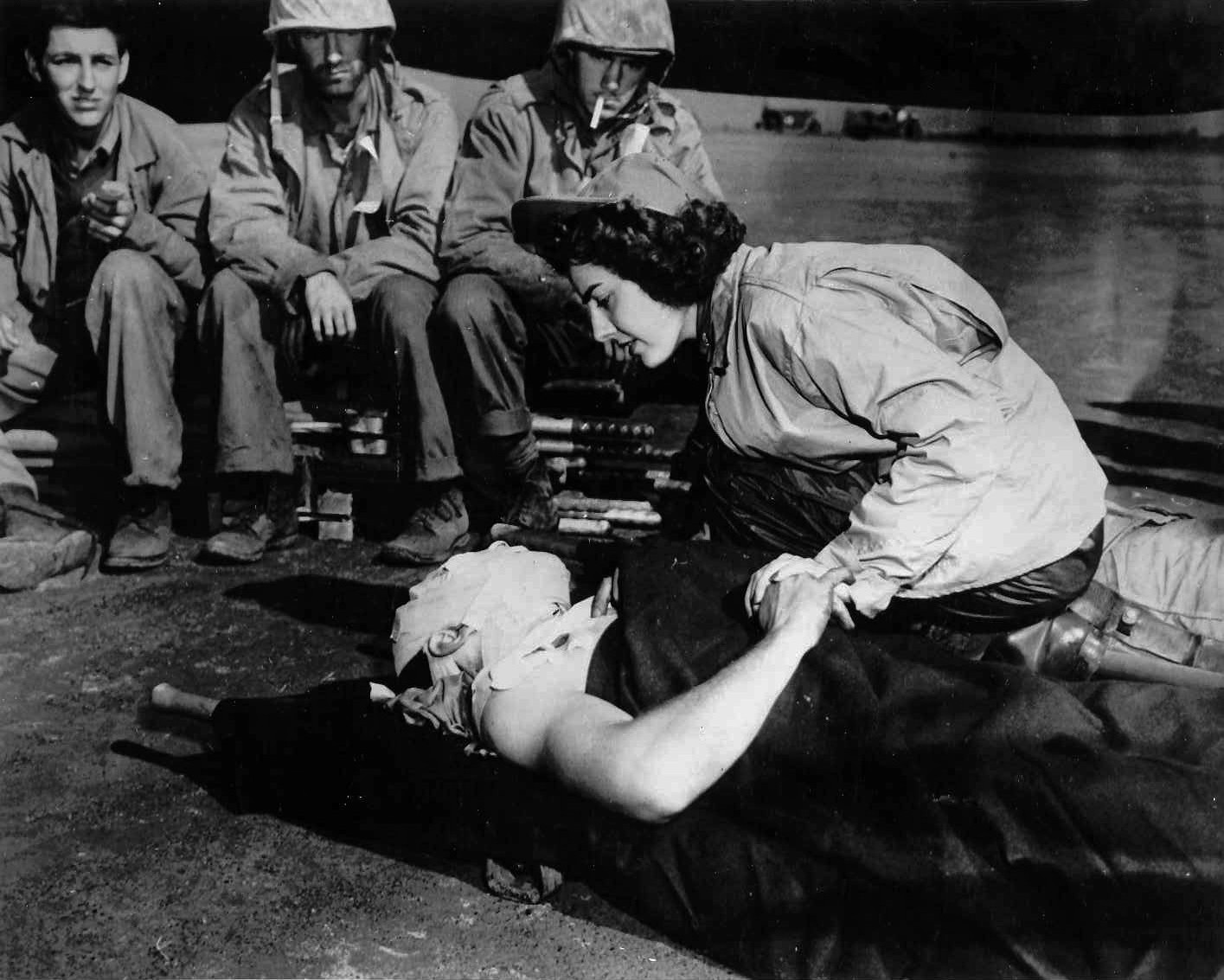
Jane Kendeigh, who became the first Navy flight nurse to serve in an active combat zone in 1945 in Iwo Jima.

A flight nurse is a registered nurse specializing in the field of providing comprehensive pre-hospital, emergency critical care, and hospital care to a vast scope of patients. The care of these patients is generally provided during aeromedical evacuation or rescue operations aboard helicopters, propeller aircraft, or jet aircraft. On board a rescue aircraft, is a flight nurse, accompanied by flight medics and respiratory practitioners, as well as the option of a flight physician for comprehensive emergency and critical transport teams. The inclusion of a flight physician is more common in pediatric and neonatal transport teams. A critical care flight nurse must be able to deal with all age groups with broad critical emergencies. With no physicians on site, the nurses scope of practice is expanded. The critical care experience is transferred over to a flight nurse with impacting factors such as altitude and changes in pressure, gravitational forces, and weather (Mazur, R., 2018). Some patients may experience exacerbations because of factors related to the cabin environment, including hypoxia, limited mobility, gas expansion, and the risk of injury related to turbulence. Resources for definitive care are limited (Rotta, A. T., 2020). Aeromedical evacuation crews coordinate with other organizations to plan for the safe and timely care and evacuation of patients. Crews must be prepared for patients with trauma and mental health illnesses (An, 2018).

== Roles and duties ==
Here are the duties and responsibilities of a flight nurse:

- Flight nurses work as a member of an aeromedical evacuation team on helicopters and propeller or jet aircraft
- Responsible for planning and preparing for aeromedical evacuation missions
- Expedite the mission and initiate emergency treatment in the absence of a flight physician
- Provide in-flight management and nursing care for patients
- Evaluate individual patient in-flight needs
- Act as a bridge between medical and operational aircrews and support personnel to promote patient comfort
- Responsible for maintaining patient care, comfort and safety
- Care for patients with both medical and traumatic issues
- Request appropriate medications, supplies and equipment to provide care to patient
- Must have training in mechanical ventilation, hemodynamic support, vasoactive medications and intensive care skills
- Specialized clinical skills in conjunction with knowledge, theory, education and expertise in hospital and pre-hospital environments, are required
- Perform advanced medical procedures without supervision of a doctor, such as intubation, ventilator management, chest tube insertion, intra-osseous line placement, central line placement, intra-aortic balloon pump management, management of pacing devices, titration of vasoactive medications, pain management, administration of anesthetic medications for intubation, and in some cases, emotional and family care

== Education ==
General requirements for most flight nurse programs include:

- License as a registered nurse
- 2–3 years of critical care experience and/or mobile intensive care unit (MICU) experience.
- Advanced cardiac life support (ACLS) certificate
- Pediatric advanced life support (PALS) certificate

== Certification process and skills ==
While specific skills that may be performed by the flight nurse, or the scope of practice, are not universal across the globe or even the United States, the flight nurse or any critical care transport member must log a series of hours to progress within this role.

According to the Association of Critical Care Transport (2020), critical care transport providers must document a minimum of 3,700 patient contact hours or have a minimum of 5 years' experience with direct patient care to have the necessary qualifications to act as a transport provider in addition to being a licensed RN in the state of transport. These providers must minimally have BLS or ACLS certifications (Nurse Journal Staff, 2023).

The next step in progressing in this role is to obtain an Advanced Transport Certification including the CFRN and CTRN (ACCT,2 020). This certification allows the nurse to provide a higher and more inclusive level of care.

After two years of critical care transport experience, the nurse can become a critical care transport provider (ACCT, 2020). This allows the nurse to assume the role of primary caregiver for the patient who is being transferred.

By allowing the nurse to assume the role of primary caregiver during critical care transport, the nurse is afforded more autonomy and a wider scope of practice. Each state and each country has its own scope of practice for the critical care transporter, or flight nurse. Based on skills that the nurse has trained in, they may perform tasks such as intubation, thoracostomy with or without mechanical ventilation, chest tube placement, management of cardiovascular devices such as Extracorporeal Membrane Oxygenation (ECMO) or Ventricular Assist Devices (VADs), in-flight ultrasound, and initiation of pharmacological interventions (ACC T, 2020). These skills may only be performed by the nurse, who is practicing within their scope of practice and who is trained to competently complete these skills.

Additional requirements may include:

- Neonatal Resuscitation Program (NRP)
- Nationally recognized trauma program such as Pre Hospital Trauma Life Support (PHTLS)
- Basic Trauma Life Support (BTLS), Trauma Nurse Core Course (TNCC), or Transport Nurse Advanced Trauma Course (TNATC)
- Certifications such as Critical Care certification (CCRN), Certified Emergency Nurse (CEN), or Certified Flight Registered Nurse (CFRN)

Helpful, but may not be required:

- EMT or EMT-P (paramedic) certification with field experience (some states require flight nurses to be certified as EMTs or EMT-Ps)

Simulations programs

- Simulation programs to prepare flight nurses have been shown to adequately mimic real world scenarios, In a study conduct at Case Western Reserve University's flight nurse program students reported that the flight simulator had felt like an actual rotor cuff transport. Additionally, heart rates were tracked to measure the stress response and rates were increased from 77 before the simulation to 100 at the peak, at the conclusion HR resolved to 72, the p value was <0.001.

== Credentialing ==
- Certified Emergency Nurse (CEN)
- Certified Flight Registered Nurse (CFRN)
- Critical Care Registered Nurse (CCRN)

== Types ==
=== Civilian ===
- Works for hospitals, federal, state and local governments, private medical evacuation firms, fire departments, and other agencies.

=== Military ===
- Army Air Force Evacuation Service
- Member of aeromedical evacuation crew
- Senior medical member of aeromedical evacuation team on Continental United States (CONUS)
- Works in intra-theatre and inter-theatre flights to provide in-flight management and nursing care
- Plan/Prepare aeromedical evacuation missions and prepa detailede facilitation plan

== Flight Nursing's Role in Community Health ==
The flight nurse is vital to the community. They aid in transport and care for the critically ill patient in extreme circumstances. These nurses possess a wide scope of practice that allows them to care for these patients in a variety of settings. The flight nurse plays a critical role in the rescues of individuals who need fast, and otherwise inaccessible transport to receive emergency care. These nurses have been used in both the military and civilian settings to perform rescue missions. The services that they provide expand the reach of hospitals and allow care to take place in rural, desert, or otherwise unreachable locations, including mountains, islands, etc. (Scuissiato, et al., 2012). Therefore, the flight nurse expands access to all community regions in critical care situations.

== Australia ==
Australia has an estimated 20% of land recognized as a desert, with a rather small population density. Providing health care to these remote rural towns can prove to be quite laborious. Australia provides a number of organizations that flight nurses are employed under.

== United States ==
In the United States, there are approximately 550,000 people who require emergency or standard medical transport every year. Situations involving the need for patients to travel via air transport include patients who have been involved in a bad accident and require transport to an intensive care unit, patients who need a transplant, or a stable patient who has a medical condition and wants to move closer to family. Flight nursing also plays a critical role in transporting a critically ill patient who lives in a rural community to a hospital that has the resources necessary to provide the care needed to the patient. Teams involved in the air transport of a patient can include nurse/nurse, nurse/paramedic, nurse/physician, nurse/respiratory therapist, or paramedic/paramedic, depending on the needs of the patient. When transporting a patient who is on vasoactive medications or vasodilator medications, the nurse is responsible for titrating the drips to maintain the hemodynamic parameters within the ordered range and the critical care needed for the patient.

== See also ==
- Aerospace Medical Association
- Air Medical Services
- Flight Nurse Badge (U.S.)
- RAF Medical Services
- Royal Flying Doctor Service of Australia
