= Emergency nursing =

Professional nursing specialty

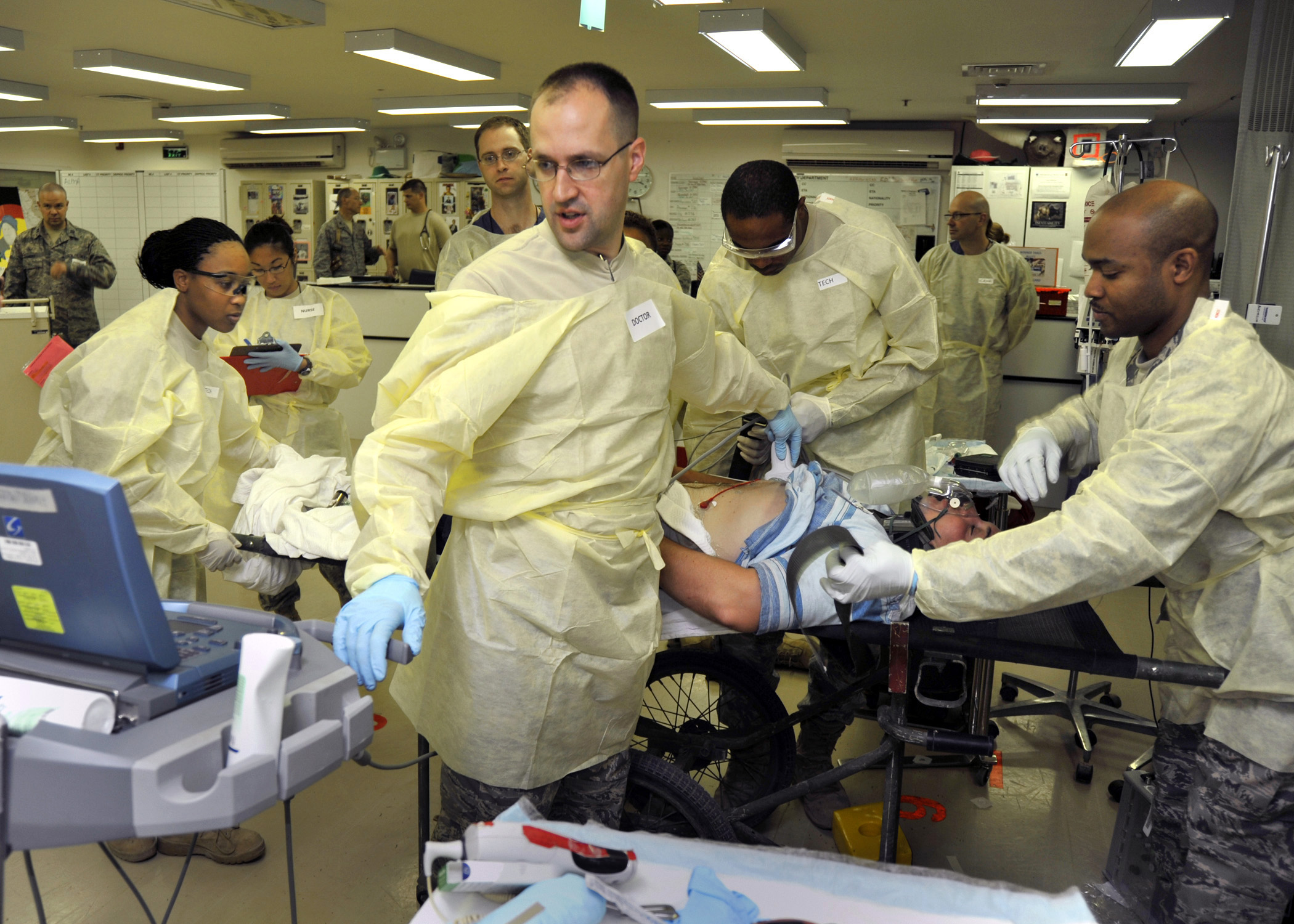
Emergency nurses and physicians care for a trauma patient.

Emergency nursing is a specialty within the field of professional nursing focusing on the care of patients who require prompt medical attention to avoid long-term disability or death. In addition to addressing "true emergencies," emergency nurses increasingly care for people who are unwilling or unable to get primary medical care elsewhere and come to emergency departments for help. In fact, only a small percentage of emergency department (ED) patients have emergency conditions such as a stroke, heart attack or major trauma. Emergency nurses also tend to patients with acute alcohol and/or drug intoxication, psychiatric and behavioral problems and those who have been raped.

Emergency nurses are most frequently employed in hospital emergency departments, although they may also work in urgent care centers, sports arenas, and on medical transport aircraft and ground ambulances.

== The history of emergency nursing ==
Around the 1800s hospitals became more popular and there was a growth in emergency care. The first development of an emergency room was originally called the "First Aid Room." Originally, nurses only dressed wounds, applied eye ointments, treated minor burns with salves and bandages, and attended patients with minor illnesses like colds and sore throats. The rule of thumb was first in, first served, but there were many cases where some people were in more need of emergency care than others, and as the situation became more intolerable, one of the greatest medical developments came into perspective: triage.

For centuries triage had been used in war but was not yet established in the emergency department. The first time triage was referred to during a non-disaster situation was at Yale New Haven Hospital, Connecticut, United States in 1963, and since then has become developed and more defined.

== Emergency nurse skills, knowledge and qualities ==
Emergency nurses must be able to sit, stand, walk, reach, squat and lift throughout their eight- or twelve-hour shift. They must have good manual dexterity, hearing and vision. They must understand principles of human development, anatomy, physiology, pharmacology, They must also have a working knowledge of the many legal issues impacting health care such as consent, handling of evidence, mandatory reporting of child and elder abuse, and involuntary psychiatric holds. They must be adept and comfortable working with patients of many different backgrounds, cultures, religions, ages and types of disabilities. They must be calm and professional at all times, especially when dealing with situations which are difficult, emotional or disgusting. Emergency nurses must also know how to care for themselves physically and emotionally.

== The role of the emergency nurse ==
The role of the emergency nurse is to evaluate and monitor patients and to manage their care in the emergency department. They may also supervise licensed practical nurses and unlicensed assistive personnel ("nurse aides" or "care partners"). It can be a challenge to get everything done quickly and correctly in an ever-changing environment. Some ED nurse functions are common to other nursing specialties, while others are specific to emergency nursing. These can be divided into 1.) assessment, 2.) planning and managing care, 3.) tasks, 4.) communication, and 5.) teaching.

1. Assessment. Emergency nurses interview a patient to get a health history, a list of current medications being taken and allergies and perform a physical examination. This is often a limited exam based on the patient's chief complaint and only infrequently a complete head-to-toe examination. The ED nurse periodically reassesses the patient to detect any changes, either improvement, decompensation or no change. This may be done after a treatment is given to evaluate its effectiveness or at certain time intervals as appropriate for the patient's condition.
2. Planning and managing care. The ED nurse must have a plan of what to do for the patient, when and in what order. Managing an ED patient's care includes decisions such as whether the patient can go to X-ray before getting blood drawn, what tasks to delegate to unlicensed assistive personnel (UAPs), and how many visitors are allowed in the patient's room, among others.
3. Tasks. There are procedures only the physician can perform, but many others are done by the emergency nurse. These include inserting intravenous ("IV") lines, urinary catheters and nasogastric ("NG") tubes; drawing blood samples from veins and arteries; dressing wounds; applying splints, administering medications, and in certain jurisdictions RNs are trained to suture wounds. In some cases, emergency nurses may order certain tests and medications following "collaborative practice guidelines" or "standing orders" set out by the hospital's emergency physician staff.
4. Communication. All the emergency nurse's observations are recorded in the patient's medical record. These are used by other members of the healthcare team caring for the patient. ED nurses must keep the emergency physician apprised of a patient's condition; if it suddenly worsens, the doctor must be notified immediately. If the patient is admitted to a room in the hospital or transferred to another facility, the emergency nurse must "give report" to the nurse at the patient's destination.
5. Teaching. The emergency nurse keeps the patient and their family up-to-date throughout the visit and conducts teaching sessions with them. Topics often include how to take prescribed medication, how to prevent complications, when to return to the ED, and a patient's diagnosis. These are often short interactions and the nurse must evaluate what information the patient needs, how in detail to explain a topic, and the patient's readiness to learn. To do this, nurses must consider the patient's level of education, level of pain, education level, cultural influences, age, deficiencies in vision or hearing, and other factors.

== Special nurse roles ==
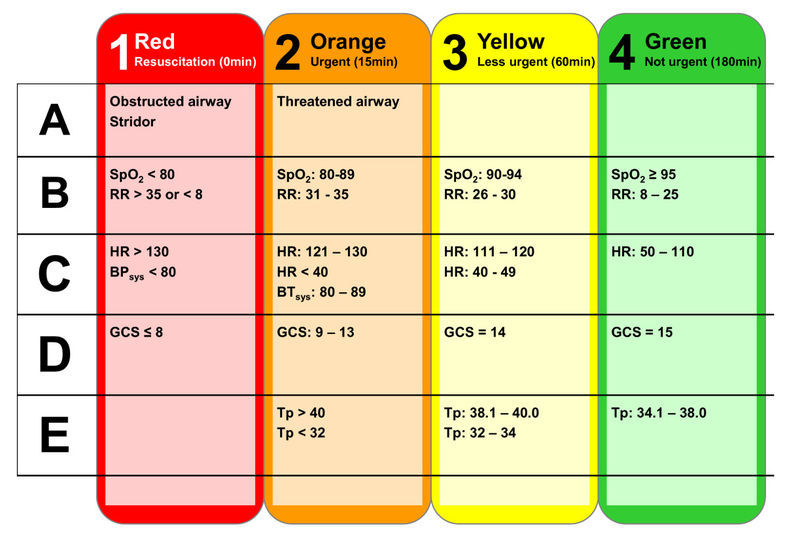
One four-tiered system of triage

=== Triage Nurse ===
An emergency nurse is assigned to triage patients as they arrive in the emergency department, and as such, is the first professional patients will see. Therefore, this emergency nurse must be skilled at rapid, accurate physical examination and early recognition of life-threatening conditions. Based on the triage nurse's findings, a triage category is assigned. The Emergency Severity Index (ESI) triages patients into five groups from 1 (most urgent) to 5 (least urgent).

=== ED Charge Nurse ===
An experienced emergency nurse is put in the role of charge nurse or team leader. This nurse is responsible for the overall "flow" of the department. He or she assigns nurses to patients, assures patients are being transported to and from tests outside the ED, addresses patient complaints and concerns, communicates with the house supervisor, takes phone calls, and assures nurses get their breaks.

=== Emergency Palliative Nurse ===
Nurses who specialize in palliative care are sometimes utilized to bring rapid-symptom relief and timely goals-of-care discussions to patients presenting to the emergency department. Similar programs exist which rely heavily on social workers and chaplains for the early introduction of palliative care in the hospital encounter.

== Emergency Nurse Practitioner (ENP) ==
=== In the United Kingdom ===
A specialist nurse will independently assess, diagnose, investigate, and treat a wide range of common accidents and injuries working autonomously without supervision by medical staff. They primarily treat a wide range of musculoskeletal problems, skin problems and minor illnesses. They are trained in advanced nursing skills. Under the National Health Service grading system, ENPs are typically graded Band 6 or 7.

Additionally, some specialized nurses perform as emergency care practitioners. They generally work in the pre-hospital setting dealing with a wide range of medical or emergency problems. Their primary function is to assess, diagnose and treat a patient in the home in an emergency setting.

=== In the United States ===
An advanced practice nurse assesses, diagnoses, and treats a variety of common illnesses, injuries and disease processes in children and teens in emergency care settings. ENPs are trained in advanced nursing and medical skills such as x-ray interpretation, ophthalmic slit lamp examination, suturing, local and regional anesthesia, abscess incision and drainage, advanced airway techniques, fracture reduction, and casting and splinting.

=== In Australia ===
Australian nurse practitioners follow the clinical practice guidelines developed by the Victorian Emergency Nurse Practitioner Collaborative (VENPC), which has supported nurse practitioner development in Victoria. These guidelines include attending to minor head injuries, burns, open wounds, joint pain, haemophilia, blood and fluid exposure, PV bleeding, urinary tract infections (UTIs), abdominal pain, cellulitis, and more.

== Emergency nurses in Africa ==
Emergency nurses work in various places, many of which are understaffed as there are nursing shortages across Africa. There is also a shortage of doctors, leaving many tasks for nurses with limited guidelines or standards to deal with, and the scope of practice is quite undefined for many emergency nurses. Nurses may be required to work outside their scope, causing frustration and increasing the opportunities for occupational health hazards. It can be speculated that triage protocols are either lacking or not being followed. The limited basic knowledge and skill of emergency nursing included in undergraduate nurse training programs, and the limited number of nurse trainers, provides difficulty for many pending nurses to acquire the skills needed to work in emergency settings.

== Challenges of emergency nursing ==
Emergency nursing is a demanding job and can be unpredictable. Emergency nurses need to have basic knowledge of most specialty areas, to be able to work under pressure, communicate effectively with many types of patients, collaborate with a variety of health care providers and prioritize the tasks that must be performed.

It can be quite draining both physically and mentally for many nurses. Australian emergency departments treat over eight million patients each year as of 2018. They spend much of their time on their feet and must be ready for unexpected changes in patients' conditions as well as sudden influxes of patients to the emergency department. Emergency department nurses may be exposed to traumatic situations such as heavy bleeding, dismemberment and even death.

Violence is a growing challenge for many nurses in the emergency department. Emergency nurses often receive both physical and verbal abuse from patients and visitors.

== Board certification in emergency nursing ==
=== Certified Emergency Nurse - CEN ===
The Certified Emergency Nurse (CEN) designation is granted to a registered nurse who has demonstrated expertise in emergency nursing by passing a computer-administered examination given by the Board of Certification for Emergency Nursing (BCEN). The certification exam first became available in July 1980, was accredited by the Accreditation Board for Specialty Nursing Certification (ABSNC) in February 2002, and was re-accredited in 2007, 2012, and 2016. The certification is valid for four years, and can be renewed either by passing another examination, or by attesting that the nurse has completed 100 continuing education units (CEUs) in the specialty.

As of 2019, the BCEN has designated over 38,000 active CENs in the United States and Canada. The CEN exam has 175 questions; 150 are used for testing purposes, 25 are sample questions. The candidate has three hours to take the exam and a passing score is ≥70%.

=== Certified Pediatric Emergency Nurse - CPEN ===
The Certified Pediatric Emergency Nurse (CPEN) designation is applied to a registered nurse who has demonstrated expertise in pediatric emergency nursing by passing a computer-administered examination given jointly by the Board of Certification for Emergency Nursing (BCEN) and the Pediatric Nursing Certification Board (PNCB). The certification exam first became available on January 21, 2009, and was accredited by ABSNC in May 2015. The certification is valid for four years, and can be renewed either by passing another examination, by completing 100 contact hours (continuing education) in the specialty, or by completing 1,000 clinical practice hours and 40 contact hours in the specialty.

As of 2020, the BCEN and the PNCB have designated over 5,200 active CPENs. The CPEN exam has 175 questions; 150 are used for testing purposes, 25 are sample questions. The candidate has three hours to take the exam and a passing score is ⪀ 87%.

== Additional emergency nursing education/certification ==
- Advanced Burn Life Support (ABLS)
- Advanced Cardiac Life Support (ACLS)
- Advanced Medical Life Support (AMLS)
- Advanced Trauma Care for Nurses (ATCN)
- Basic Life Support (BLS)
- Certified Flight Registered Nurse (CFRN)
- Certified Transport Registered Nurse (CTRN)
- Course in Advanced Trauma (CATN)
- Emergency Nursing Pediatric Course (ENPC)
- Geriatric Emergency Nursing Education (GENE)
- Mobile Intensive Care Nurse (MICN)
- National Institutes of Health Stroke Scale Certification (NIHSS)
- Neonatal Resuscitation Program (NRP)
- Pediatric Advanced Life Support (PALS)
- Pre-Hospital Emergency Care (PHEC)
- Trauma Certified Registered Nurse (TCRN)
- Trauma Nurse Specialist (TNS)
- Trauma Nursing Core Course (TNCC)
- AMBULANCE NURSING
