= Psychiatric-mental health nurse practitioner =

Type of US certified nurse practitioner

Occupation
- Occupation type: Profession
- Activity sectors: Healthcare, Advanced Practice Registered Nurse

Description
- Education required: Master of Science in Nursing (MSN) or Doctor of Nursing Practice (DNP)
- Related jobs: nurse midwife, nurse anesthetist, clinical nurse specialist

In the United States, a psychiatric-mental health nurse practitioner (PMHNP) is an advanced practice registered nurse trained to provide a wide range of mental health services to patients and families in a variety of settings. PMHNPs diagnose, conduct therapy, and prescribe medications for patients who have psychiatric disorders, medical organic brain disorders or substance abuse problems. They are licensed to provide emergency psychiatric services, psychosocial and physical assessments of their patients, treatment plans, and manage patient care. They may also serve as consultants or as educators for families and staff. The PMHNP has a focus on psychiatric diagnosis, including the differential diagnosis of medical disorders with psychiatric symptoms, and on medication treatment for psychiatric disorders.

A PMHNP is trained to practice autonomously. In 27 US states, nurse practitioners (NPs) already diagnose and treat without the supervision of a psychiatrist. This is in contrast to 2008, when nurse practitioners could autonomously diagnose and treat in 23 states, and could only prescribe in 12 states. In other states, PMHNPs have reduced or restricted practice, requiring a collaborative agreement with a physician expert, a standard scope of practice signed by a physician, or other limits on practice or prescribing. In these states, they still practice independently to diagnose disorders, provide therapy and prescribe medications. Titles vary by state, but usually NP, CRNP, APRN, or ARNP are commonly used.

== Education ==
The first step to becoming a psychiatric-mental health nurse practitioner is becoming a registered nurse (RN). First, it is required to earn a Bachelor of Science in Nursing (BSN) from an accredited program (typically 4 years, or alternatively, an Associate Degree in Nursing (ADN) followed by a Bachelor of Science in Nursing Completion (BSN completion) program). Some students who have a bachelors degree in an unrelated field will complete a Master of Science in Nursing or Master of Nursing direct entry to RN. They can then complete a post masters certificate to PMHNP. After completing the program of choice, the National Council Licensure Examination for a Registered Nurse (NCLEX-RN) must be taken and passed before becoming an RN. After acquiring RN licensure, the individual can then start applying to a master's or doctoral program that is accredited by the Commission on Collegiate Nursing Education (CCNE), or the Accreditation Commission for Education in Nursing (ACEN). A Psychiatric Mental Health Nurse Practitioner degree requires two to five additional years of training. At minimum, the candidate must complete an approved Master of Science in Nursing (MSN), post-master's certificate, or Doctor of Nursing Practice (DNP) advanced nursing education program.

For individuals with a bachelor's degree in a field other than nursing, accelerated BSN programs or master's entry/graduate entry to practice nursing programs offer alternative pathways. Accelerated BSN programs provide a condensed curriculum for non-nurses to earn a BSN in one and a half to two years, allowing them to pursue MSN or DNP programs. Master's entry programs typically integrate basic nursing coursework with graduate-level PMHNP studies, taking three to four years to complete. All PMHNP programs require in clinical preceptorships, with a minimum of 500 hours for MSN and 1000 hours for DNP, before students become eligible for the PMHNP board examination.

The DNP degree has been suggested as the planned entry-level degree for advanced practice registered nurses, according to the ANCC. However, no state has initiated any laws regarding the DNP as the minimum degree. It is expected that current master's-prepared nurses will be "grandfathered' into the new system, and as long as they keep their certification current, they will not be required to pursue a doctoral degree.

There are many schools that offer the graduate education required for this profession. Notable schools with psychiatric-mental health nurse practitioner programs are Vanderbilt University School of Nursing, Yale School of Nursing, Saint Louis University, University of California-San Francisco, University of Pennsylvania, and Columbia University School of Nursing. A listing of PMHNP programs by state can be found online at the American Nurses Credentialing Center (ANCC) and American Psychiatric Nurses Association (APNA).

The cost of education can vary greatly. Programs at public universities are typically less expensive for state residents than for out-of-state residents. For example, at UCSF the cost for the Masters program with in-state tuition is approximately $12,245 a year; for an out-of-state student, the tuition is $24,798. In addition, programs at public universities tend to be less expensive than programs at private universities.

== Practice Settings ==
Psychiatric-mental health nurse practitioners can choose between a variety of practice settings to work in. Some PMHNPs choose to specialize in a certain area within the field, which causes them to reside in certain practice settings. Another deciding factor for where a PMHNP chooses to reside may depend on whether they are following a specific psychiatrist to improve their education. Such settings include hospitals, detoxification clinics, outpatient offices, recovery centers, correctional facilities, court hospitals, private practices, or veterans affairs hospitals.

== Sub-Specialties ==
Psychiatric-mental health nurse practitioners have many options as far as sub-specialties go. PMHNP's can specialize in specific areas within the field to work with a specific age of patients, a specific type of disorder, or specific conditions. Addiction medicine is a sub-specialty that deals with the diagnosis and treatment of individuals struggling with any type of addiction, whether it be drugs, nicotine, alcohol, prescription medicine, gambling, etc. The forensic psychiatry sub-specialty is the interconnection between mental health and criminology, where a PMHNP can anticipate dealing with individuals with mental illness in a court case or prison. The military sub-specialty deals with the diagnosis and treatment of many military-related mental health issues, such as PTSD. Child and adolescent psychiatry sub-specialty deals with diagnosing and treating many behavioral mental disorders found in children, such as ADHD. The geriatric psychiatry sub-specialty focuses on dealing with mental illness found in older adults in the late adulthood period. Psychosomatic medicine sub-specialty deals with the interconnections between mental illness and physical illness, such as self harm.

== Disorders ==
Psychiatric-mental health nurse practitioners are able to assess, diagnose, treat, and improve a wide range of mental disorders. Common mental disorders PMHNP's work with are anxiety, depression, eating disorders, trauma-related disorders, personality disorders, and ADHD. Psychiatric-mental health nurse practitioners can work on a variety of mental disorders, and they can also work on a variety of age groups with these mental disorders. PMHNPs can work with any patient from early childhood to late adulthood.

== Provider Shortages ==
Psychiatric-mental health nurse practitioners are in very high demand. As of 2020, throughout the United States, there were 5,766 areas with a psychiatric-mental health nurse practitioner shortage, and over 6,500 PMHNP's were needed to end this shortage. Throughout the United States, there has been a significant rise in mental health issues, and some are recently related to the COVID-19 pandemic. Throughout the pandemic, there were high reports of loneliness and financial instability that led to symptoms of depression and anxiety. Due to this rise in mental illness throughout the United States, psychiatric-mental health practitioners are in need now more than ever.

Even before the COVID-19 pandemic, there were already rising numbers of mental health issues seen in adults and youth in the United States. Prior to COVID-19, 19.6% of adults experienced a mental illness, and that estimates around 50 million American adults. Along with an increase in mental health issues, the rate of suicide ideation among adults has been rising, and it especially peaked during the COVID-19 pandemic. Depressive episodes, severe depression, and suicide rates increased among youth in the United States. Suicide is now the second-leading cause of death among adolescents in the United States. The rate of substance abuse by American adults and adolescents has also been increasing.

With the rise of mental health issues found in adults and youth in the United States, PMHNPs are eagerly needed. Most adults and youth who deal with mental issues do not seek help, and this is particularly because it takes weeks, or even months, before individuals can be seen by a PMHNP. There is a huge labor shortage of PMHNPs that needs to be filled now because of the drastic increase in mental health issues in the United States.

== See also ==
- Psychiatric and mental health nursing
- List of counseling topics
- Mental health professional
- Mental health
- Mental illness
- Nurse Practitioner
- Registered psychiatric nurse (Canada)
