= Mental health nursing =

Nursing specialty focused on mental health and related conditions

Mental health nursing, also known in some jurisdictions as psychiatric nursing or psychiatric–mental health nursing, is a nursing specialty concerned with the care of people who are at risk of, or experiencing, mental health conditions, substance use disorders or related behavioural difficulties. It combines attention to physical and psychosocial health with therapeutic communication, environmental and social factors, and the person's own goals.

Mental health nurses work with people across the lifespan in hospitals, community services, primary care, residential services, schools, correctional settings and people's homes. Depending on their education and legal scope of practice, their work may include comprehensive assessment, nursing diagnosis and care planning, psychosocial interventions, medication administration and monitoring, physical health care, crisis intervention, suicide prevention, care coordination, health education and advocacy. The therapeutic relationship is a defining feature of the specialty, although it is one component of a wider clinical and public-health role.

Education, titles and authority vary substantially between countries. Some systems provide direct-entry undergraduate education in mental health nursing; others prepare a general registered nurse who later specializes. Advanced-practice mental health nurses may assess and diagnose mental disorders, provide psychotherapy and prescribe medicines where local law authorizes them to do so.

== Scope and terminology ==
The International Council of Nurses (ICN) uses mental health nursing as an umbrella term for titles used in different countries, including psychiatric nurse and psychiatric–mental health nurse. The title does not by itself identify a uniform licence or scope: traditions, population needs, legislation, education and professional regulation differ among and sometimes within countries.

All nurses encounter mental health needs and are expected to promote mental well-being, recognize distress, provide appropriate care and arrange referral when necessary. Mental health nurses have additional specialty preparation for work with people experiencing complex or persistent mental health conditions, substance-use problems and behavioural difficulties. Their practice draws on nursing, biological and social sciences while maintaining a holistic focus on the interaction of physical health, psychological experience, relationships, culture, environment and social circumstances.

The words used for people receiving care differ across health systems and contexts. Patient, client, consumer and service user are all used, while many professional standards favour person-centred wording and respect for an individual's stated preferences.

== Roles and areas of practice ==
Mental health nursing roles depend on the nurse's competence, employment setting and legal authority. Common elements identified in international and national standards include person-centred care, clinical assessment, therapeutic use of self, evidence-informed practice, ethical practice, advocacy, leadership and interprofessional collaboration.

=== Assessment and care planning ===
A mental health nursing assessment considers the person's current concerns, strengths, preferences, mental state, physical health, medicines, substance use, daily functioning, relationships, culture and social circumstances. It may also consider exposure to trauma, safeguarding needs and immediate risks such as self-harm, suicide, violence, neglect or vulnerability. The nurse uses this information with the person, and where appropriate their family or supporters, to agree goals and formulate an individualized care plan.

Assessment is continuous rather than a single admission task. Nurses monitor response to care, document changes, evaluate outcomes and revise plans. Whether a nurse independently makes a formal diagnosis or orders investigations depends on the jurisdiction and level of practice; nursing assessments and diagnoses do not necessarily have the same purpose or legal status as a medical diagnosis.

=== Therapeutic relationships and psychosocial care ===
Mental health nurses deliberately use communication and the professional relationship to understand a person's experience, support autonomy and create conditions in which care can occur. This includes establishing trust, listening without unnecessary judgement, maintaining professional boundaries, responding to distress and ending the relationship in a planned way. The relationship is collaborative but not socially equal: the nurse retains professional responsibilities and must account for the power associated with the clinical role.

Within their training and scope, nurses may provide psychoeducation, supportive counselling, behavioural activation, motivational approaches, relapse-prevention work, group interventions and structured psychological therapies. They also support daily living, social inclusion and connection with peer, housing, employment and community resources. A 2020 systematic review described the therapeutic alliance as central to mental health nursing but found that research on specific interventions to improve nurse–patient relationships was limited and methodologically weak.

=== Medication and physical health ===
Nurses commonly administer or support the use of psychiatric medications, explain their intended effects, monitor therapeutic response and adverse effects, and contribute to shared decisions about treatment. They may also coordinate laboratory or physical monitoring and help people manage medicines after discharge. Prescribing is restricted to appropriately authorized practitioners and is not part of every mental health nurse's role.

Physical health care is integral to the specialty. Assessment may include nutrition, sleep, pain, mobility, sexual health, smoking, chronic disease and the physical effects of medicines or substance use. Nurses provide or arrange preventive care, health education, screening and referral, and work with primary and specialist services when mental and physical health needs coexist.

=== Crisis, safety and rights ===
In crisis services and other settings, mental health nurses assess immediate needs, seek to reduce distress, use verbal and environmental de-escalation techniques, develop collaborative safety plans and coordinate urgent support. Suicide-related practice includes direct enquiry about suicidal thoughts and behaviour, assessment of risk and protective factors, observation when clinically indicated, restriction of access to lethal means, documentation and follow-up.

Mental health care can involve involuntary assessment, treatment, seclusion or restraint under local law. Nurses working in such circumstances have responsibilities for safety, informed consent and decision-making capacity, and for protecting dignity, privacy and legal rights. International guidance favours community-based, person-centred services, supported decision-making and approaches that prevent or reduce coercion and other rights violations. Legal powers and duties vary, so practice is governed by the law, professional code and institutional policy of the relevant jurisdiction.

=== Families, carers and care coordination ===
With the person's agreement, nurses may involve family members, carers or other supporters in assessment, education, crisis planning and discharge. Confidentiality still applies: a nurse may listen to information offered by relatives without disclosing the person's private information in return, and may provide general information or support where specific disclosure is not permitted.

Mental health nurses often coordinate care between primary care, specialist mental health and substance-use services, hospitals, social services and community organizations. Coordination can include arranging referrals, leading multidisciplinary reviews, supporting transitions between services and addressing practical barriers such as housing, transport or access to benefits. People with lived experience, peer workers and culturally specific services may be partners in this work.

== Settings and populations ==
Mental health nurses practise across primary, secondary and tertiary care. Settings include inpatient and outpatient psychiatric services, community mental health teams, crisis and home-treatment services, primary-care clinics, emergency departments, substance-use services, residential and rehabilitation programmes, schools and universities, perinatal services, older-adult and dementia services, forensic and correctional services, veterans' services, private practice and telehealth. The balance between hospital and community work varies with the organization and resources of the local health system.

Practice spans the lifespan. Nurses may specialize in infant, child and adolescent mental health; perinatal mental health; working-age adult services; or older-adult care. Other areas of focus include eating disorders, neurodevelopmental and intellectual disabilities, addictions, trauma, homelessness and the mental health effects of displacement or disaster. Specialization does not remove the need to consider developmental stage, family context, physical health, culture and communication in every setting.

Community models may combine clinic appointments, home visits, case management, outreach, peer support and links with housing or vocational services. The World Health Organization describes community-based networks as a means of providing person-centred and rights-based alternatives to long-stay institutional care, but the availability and composition of such services differ widely.

== Education, regulation and advanced practice ==
Preparation for mental health nursing includes classroom and supervised clinical learning. Typical subjects include mental and physical health assessment, therapeutic communication, psychopharmacology, psychosocial interventions, substance use, crisis care, trauma-responsive practice, law and ethics, cultural safety, research and recovery- and rights-based care. The ICN recommends competency-based preparation at bachelor's-degree level and continuing professional development after registration.

Two broad educational models coexist. In a direct-entry or field-specific model, a student completes an undergraduate programme whose principal field is mental health nursing. In a postgraduate-specialty model, a nurse first qualifies for comprehensive or general registration and later gains mental health experience, education or certification. Some countries use both models or retain restricted licences for nurses educated under earlier systems. Consequently, a job title alone does not establish what a nurse is legally permitted to do.

Regulators set requirements for entry to practice, continuing competence and professional conduct. Professional associations may publish specialty standards or credentials, but a voluntary credential is not the same as statutory registration. Employers further define roles through local policies, while each nurse remains accountable for working within individual competence and legal scope.

An advanced practice nurse in mental health usually has graduate education and an expanded clinical role. Depending on the country or state, advanced-practice mental health nurses may independently assess and diagnose conditions, order or interpret tests, provide psychotherapy, prescribe and manage medicines, lead services, educate staff or conduct research. The ICN describes master's- or doctoral-level nursing education for this role, while emphasizing that autonomy and prescribing authority are determined locally. In the United States, a common advanced-practice title is psychiatric-mental health nurse practitioner.

== History of the profession ==
The history of mental health nursing is not a single sequence of discoveries. The occupation developed differently within national asylum systems, general nursing, colonial health services and later community services. In several European countries, late-nineteenth-century psychiatric nursing emerged as a specialization performed under medical authority in large institutions; its educational status, gender composition and relationship with general nursing varied by country.

In Britain, the Medico-Psychological Association began a national training scheme for asylum attendants in 1891. The scheme sought to improve care and the standing of institutions, but poor pay, working conditions and limited career prospects constrained its effect. Training also contributed to attendants' demands for occupational recognition and organization. Other countries created their own hospital-based schools and registration arrangements, sometimes keeping psychiatric nursing separate from general nursing and sometimes integrating the two.

After the Second World War, nurses in the United States and elsewhere developed graduate education and theories that defined a more autonomous therapeutic role. Hildegard Peplau's 1952 book Interpersonal Relations in Nursing presented nursing as an interpersonal process and strongly influenced psychiatric nursing education and practice. Peplau and contemporaries including Dorothy Mereness used nurse-led graduate programmes to develop specialist knowledge and advanced practice.

From the mid-twentieth century, the downsizing or closure of long-stay psychiatric hospitals and the development of community services changed nursing work in many countries. Roles expanded into community assessment, home visiting, rehabilitation, case management and crisis care, although inpatient care remained an important part of the specialty.

Contemporary professional standards increasingly emphasize recovery as defined by the individual, shared decision-making, physical-health integration, trauma-responsive and culturally safe care, involvement of people with lived experience, and protection of human rights. These changes coexist with continuing debate about nursing's therapeutic identity, the balance between relational and biomedical work, and the use of coercion in mental health services.

== International variation ==
The size and preparation of the mental health nursing workforce vary sharply between regions and income groups. In some health systems, specialist nurses are numerous and work at several levels of practice; in others, general nurses provide much of the available mental health care with limited specialist support. Differences in regulation, service funding and the distribution of workers between urban and rural areas affect which roles can be implemented.

The following examples illustrate different regulatory models; they are not an exhaustive comparison.

Examples of education and regulation
| Jurisdiction | Model |
|---|---|
| Australia | Mental health nursing is practised within national registration as a registered nurse. The Australian College of Mental Health Nurses offers a voluntary specialist credential based on registration, education, experience and professional development; the credential is not a separate statutory registration category. |
| Canada | Registered psychiatric nursing is licensed as a distinct nursing profession in several provinces and territories. Regulators use national entry-level competencies and a common registration examination, while registered nurses also work in mental health settings. |
| Ireland | Mental health nursing is a direct-entry field. An approved four-year degree prepares graduates for registration in the psychiatric nurses division of the Nursing and Midwifery Board of Ireland's register. |
| New Zealand | The Nursing Council uses comprehensive scopes for registered nurses rather than a separate contemporary mental health registration field. Mental health is included in pre-registration education, and registered nurses may subsequently work in mental health services. |
| United Kingdom | Mental health is one of four fields of pre-registration nursing practice recognized by the Nursing and Midwifery Council, alongside adult, children's and learning-disability nursing. Approved programmes lead to registration in one or more fields. |
| United States | Nurses first qualify and obtain licensure as registered nurses, then may specialize through employment, graduate education and voluntary certification. The American Nurses Credentialing Center's PMH-BC credential requires post-licensure psychiatric–mental health experience and continuing education. Graduate-prepared psychiatric–mental health nurse practitioners have an advanced scope governed by state law. |

Because national systems change, comparisons of titles should be checked against the relevant regulator rather than used to infer equivalence. For example, the abbreviation RPN can mean registered psychiatric nurse in parts of Canada and registered practical nurse in other Canadian jurisdictions.

== See also ==
- Community mental health service
- Community psychiatric nurse
- Forensic nursing
- Hildegard Peplau
- Mental health professional
- Mental health nurse
- Psychiatric-mental health nurse practitioner
- Registered psychiatric nurse
- Tidal Model
