= List of Living Legends of the American Academy of Nursing =

The Living Legend designation from the American Academy of Nursing is bestowed upon a very small number of nurses "in recognition of the multiple contributions these individuals have made to our profession and our society and in recognition of the continuing impact of these contributions on the provision of health care services in the United States and throughout the world." Each Living Legend has been a Fellow of the American Academy of Nursing (FAAN) for at least 15 years.

While over 2,000 nurses have achieved the FAAN designation, only a few dozen have been named Living Legends.

== Living Legends ==
Year	Name	Alma mater	Affiliations	Notes
1994	Faye Glenn Abdellah	Columbia University	United States Public Health Service	Former deputy surgeon general of the United States. First dean of Uniformed Services University Graduate School of Nursing. Authored Patient Centered Approaches to Nursing.
1994	Myrtle Aydelotte	University of Minnesota	University of Iowa	Former CEO of American Nurses Association. Founding nursing school dean at University of Iowa.
1994	Mary Elizabeth Carnegie	New York University	American Journal of Nursing	Editorial staff member of American Journal of Nursing. Senior editor of Nursing Outlook. First editor of Nursing Research. Nursing school dean at Florida A&M University.
1994	Ildaura Murillo-Rohde	New York University	National Association of Hispanic Nurses	Founding president of National Association of Hispanic Nurses. First Hispanic nurse to complete PhD at New York University. First Hispanic nursing school dean at New York University. Recipient of Hildegard Peplau Lifetime Achievement Award.
1994	Hildegard Peplau	Columbia University	Rutgers University	Author of Interpersonal Relations in Nursing. Only person to hold president and executive director posts at American Nurses Association.
1994	Jessie M. Scott	Columbia University	United States Public Health Service	Former Assistant Surgeon General, United States Public Health Service. Recipient of Distinguished Service Medal from USPHS. Involved in creation of the 1964 Nurse Training Act.
1994	Harriet Werley	University of Utah	University of Wisconsin–Milwaukee	Founding editor of Research in Nursing. Created the Nursing Minimum Data Set. Nursing department chief at Walter Reed Army Institute of Research. Distinguished professor at the University of Wisconsin–Milwaukee.
1995	Luther Christman	Michigan State University	Rush University	Helped to develop the Rush Model of Nursing and the clinical nurse specialist role. Founding member of the National Male Nurse Association, which became the American Assembly for Men in Nursing. First male inducted into the ANA Hall of Fame. First male nursing school dean in US.
1995	Rheba de Tornyay	Stanford University	University of Washington	Dean emeritus at University of Washington School of Nursing. Former president of the American Academy of Nursing. Namesake for an aging center at University of Washington.
1995	Virginia Ohlson	University of Chicago	University of Illinois at Urbana–Champaign	Department head for public health nursing at University of Illinois College of Nursing between 1970 and 1980. Helped to establish the master's degree in public health nursing at the school. Served as an international nursing consultant and received an order of knighthood from the emperor of Japan.
1995	Rozella M. Schlotfeldt	University of Chicago	Case Western Reserve University	Dean emerita of the Frances Payne Bolton School of Nursing at Case Western Reserve University. Established faculty and nursing practice collaborations at the school. Served on a task force to create the 1964 Nurse Training Act.
1996	Clifford Jordan	University of Pennsylvania	University of Pennsylvania	First male tenured nursing professor at Penn. Coordinated Penn's graduate program in nursing service administration. Served as executive director of the Association of Operating Room Nurses.
1996	Mary V. Neal		University of Maryland	Chair of pediatric nursing at University of Maryland. Established a research program at the university hospital's neonatal intensive care unit. Developed a "rocking hammock" and studied stimulation in premature infants. Created a conceptual model for maternal-child nursing.
1996	Dorothy M. Smith	Harvard University	University of Florida	Founding dean of the University of Florida College of Nursing. Developed the clinical assessment database. Served as a hospital chief of nursing practice while on the faculty at Florida.
1997	Mabel Wandelt	University of Michigan	University of Texas at Austin	Developer of Quality Patient Care Scale (Qualpacs). One of four initial nurse researchers on "magnet hospitals" which led to the Magnet Recognition Program. Author of Guide for the Beginning Researcher.
1997	Mary Kelly Mullane	University of Chicago	University of Illinois at Chicago	Former nursing school dean at University of Illinois at Chicago. Former executive director at the American Association of Colleges of Nursing. Chaired an Illinois state research committee which encouraged nurses to pursue graduate degrees in the 1960s.
1997	Jo Eleanor Elliott	University of Michigan	University of Michigan	Former president of the American Nurses Association. Headed the USPHS Division of Nursing. Advocated college education for all nurses.
1997	Doris Schwartz	New York University	Cornell University	Professor and gerontology researcher. Former co-director of Cornell's Geriatric Nurse Practitioner and Family Nurse Practitioner programs in the 1970s.
1997	Mary Woody	Columbia University	Auburn University	Founded the nursing school at Auburn.
1997	Anne Zimmerman	Loyola University Chicago	Loyola University Chicago	President of the American Nurses Association, 1976–1978. Headed several state nursing associations.
1998	Vernice Ferguson	New York University	National Institutes of Health	Led the nursing department at the NIH Clinical Center. Former chief nursing officer for the Veterans Administration.
1998	Claire Fagin	New York University	University of Pennsylvania	First female interim president in the Ivy League.
1998	Madeleine Leininger	University of Washington	University of Washington	Emeritus professor and transcultural nursing expert.
1999	Grayce Sills	Ohio State University	Ohio State University	Former president of the American Psychiatric Nurses Association. Expert in community-based mental health nursing.
1999	Margretta Styles	University of Florida	University of California, San Francisco	Founded the American Nurses Credentialing Center.
1999	Loretta Ford	University of Colorado	University of Colorado	Co-created the first pediatric nurse practitioner program at Colorado.
1999	Connie Holleran		University of Pennsylvania	Former executive director of the International Council of Nurses.
2000	Geraldene Felton	New York University	The University of Iowa	Former nursing school dean at Iowa and former president of the American Association of Colleges of Nursing.
2000	Jeanne Quint Benoliel		University of Washington	Pioneer in palliative care. Founded the PhD program at the University of Washington School of Nursing.
2000	Shirley Chater		Texas Woman's University	President of Texas Woman's University between 1986 and 1993.
2000	Thelma Schorr	Columbia University	American Journal of Nursing	Editor-in-chief, American Journal of Nursing, 1971–1981.
2001	Susan Gortner	University of California, Berkeley	University of California, San Francisco	Pioneered clinical research in cardiovascular nursing.
2001	Mary Starke Harper		National Institute of Mental Health	Presidential adviser on mental health and aging.
2001	Lucie Kelly		Columbia University	Editor of Nursing Outlook. Past president of Sigma Theta Tau International. Created interdisciplinary nursing administration program at Columbia.
2001	Ruth Lubic		Childbirth Connection	Founded the first U.S. birthing center.
2001	Florence Wald	Yale School of Nursing	Yale School of Nursing	Established the first American hospice team.
2002	Lillian Sholtis Brunner	University of Pennsylvania	University of Pennsylvania	Editor of Textbook of Medical and Surgical Nursing and Lippincott Manual of Nursing Practice.
2002	Rhetaugh Graves Dumas	Union Institute & University	Yale University	Former dean and vice provost at the University of Michigan. Former deputy director of the National Institute of Mental Health.
2002	Virginia Saba		Georgetown University	Early leader in the nursing informatics movement.
2002	Gladys Sorensen	Columbia University	University of Arizona	President, American Academy of Nursing, 1985–1987.
2003	Signe Cooper	University of Minnesota	University of Wisconsin–Madison	Developer of the concept of continuing nursing education.
2003	Ira P. Gunn	University of Houston	U.S. Army	Early nurse anesthetist. Namesake for a professional advocacy award given by the American Association of Nurse Anesthetists.
2003	Ramona T. Mercer	University of Pittsburgh	University of California San Francisco	Nursing theorist (maternal role attainment).
2004	Florence Downs	New York University	New York University, Nursing Research Journal, American Academy of Nursing (AAN)	Editor of Nursing Research from 1979 to 1997. Directed early graduate programs in nursing.
2004	Juanita Fleming	University of Kentucky	University of Kentucky, Kentucky State University, American Academy of Nursing (AAN	Administrator at the University of Kentucky and Kentucky State University. Authored more than 50 refereed papers and 24 books or book chapters.
2004	Edith Patton Lewis	Case Western Reserve University	American Journal of Nursing, Nursing Research	Editorial staff member of Nursing Outlook, Nursing Research and American Journal of Nursing. Developed the Contemporary Nursing Series.
2004	Sally Ann Sample	University of Washington	University of Vermont	Helped to create the joint appointment (academic and clinical practice) role for the clinical nurse specialist.
2004	Shirley Smoyak	Rutgers University	Rutgers University	Founder, Journal of Psychosocial Nursing.
2005	Joyce Clifford	Brandeis University	Beth Israel Hospital	Advocate for primary nursing and for baccalaureate nursing education.
2005	Jean E. Johnson	University of Wisconsin–Madison	University of Rochester	Created sensation theory.
2005	Imogene King	Columbia University	Loyola University Chicago	Introduced the theory of goal attainment.
2005	Joan Lynaugh	University of Pennsylvania	University of Pennsylvania School of Nursing, Barbara Bates Center for the Study of the History of Nursing, American Academy of Nursing (AAN)	Honored for her contributions to nursing history, education, and healthcare policy, founding the Barbara Bates Center for the Study of the History of Nursing and advancing gerontological nursing research.
2006	Kathryn Barnard	University of Washington	University of Washington School of Nursing, National Institutes of Health (NIH), American Academy of Nursing (AAN)	Recognized for her pioneering work in infant mental health, early childhood development, and nursing research, particularly in developing the Neonatal Behavioral Assessment Scale to improve mother-infant interactions.
2006	Rosemary Donley	University of Pittsburgh	Duquesne University	Honored for her leadership in nursing education, health policy, and advocacy for vulnerable populations, particularly in social justice and healthcare access. Former president of the National League for Nursing and Sigma Theta Tau International.
2006	Marlene Kramer	Stanford University	University of Nevada Reno	Recognized for her groundbreaking research on nursing work environments and professional practice, particularly her book Reality Shock: Why Nurses Leave Nursing, which reshaped nursing retention and workplace culture.
2006	Angela McBride		Indiana University	Former president of Sigma Theta Tau International and the American Academy of Nursing. Author of The Growth and Development of Mothers and The Growth and Development of Nurse Leaders.
2006	Ellen Rudy	The Ohio State University	University of Pittsburgh	Recognized for her leadership in nursing education and research, serving as Dean of the University of Pittsburgh School of Nursing and establishing the Cameos of Caring Awards Gala to honor exceptional bedside nurses
2007	Marie Cowan	University of Washington	University of California, Los Angeles	Former dean at UCLA. Cardiovascular researcher who wrote 110 peer-reviewed articles.
2007	Phyllis Ethridge	University of Arizona	Carondelet St. Mary's Hospital	Hospital administrator who developed one of the first nursing health maintenance organizations. Appointed to Bill Clinton's 1992 health reform task force.
2007	Carrie Lenburg	Columbia University	National League for Nursing	Former associate director of the National League for Nursing. Helped to form the New York Regents External Degree Program, now known as Excelsior College.
2007	Margaret McClure	Columbia University	New York University	Hospital chief nursing officer. One of the four authors of Magnet Hospitals: Attraction and Retention of Professional Nurses.
2007	Callista Roy	University of California, Los Angeles	Boston College	Developed the adaptation model of nursing.
2007	Gloria Smith	Union Institute & University	Wayne State University	Former vice president of health programs at W. K. Kellogg Foundation.
2008	Gene Cranston Anderson	University of Wisconsin–Madison	Case Western Reserve University	Nurse researcher in maternal-infant care.
2008	Helen Grace	Northwestern University	University of Illinois at Chicago	Dean emerita of UIC College of Nursing. Co-editor for several editions of Current Issues in Nursing.
2008	Margaret Newman	New York University	Penn State University	Creator of the theory of health as expanding consciousness.
2008	Robert Piemonte	Columbia University	New York University	Former executive director of the National Student Nurses' Association.
2008	Phyllis Stern	University of California, San Francisco (UCSF)	Indiana University - Purdue University Indianapolis	Honored for her contributions to global women's health, qualitative nursing research, and feminist perspectives in healthcare, serving as Editor of Health Care for Women International and advocating for nurses' roles in health policy.
2009	Barbara Brodie	University of Virginia	University of Virginia School of Nursing, American Academy of Nursing (AAN)	Recognized for her leadership in nursing history, education, and health policy, founding the Bjoring Center for Nursing Historical Inquiry and advancing the study of nursing's impact on healthcare systems.
2009	Leah Curtin	University of Cincinnati	Nursing Management	Longtime nursing journal editor. Author of Sunflowers in the Sand: Stories from Children of War.
2009	Marjory Gordon	Boston College	Boston College	Created Gordon's functional health patterns. Serves on board of directors for North American Nursing Diagnosis Association.
2009	Ruby Leila Wilson	Duke University	Duke University	Former dean at Duke. Developed the first clinical master's program in nursing.
2010	Billye J. Brown	Baylor University	University of Texas at Austin	Former dean, University of Texas at Austin.
2010	Donna Diers	University of Technology, Sydney	Yale University	Former dean at Yale School of Nursing. Created first graduate entry program in nursing.
2010	Norma M. Lang		University of Pennsylvania	Dean emerita of nursing at University of Pennsylvania. Created a model for nursing quality assurance in the 1970s.
2010	Barbara L. Nichols		CGFNS International	Former CEO of CGFNS International
2010	Betty Smith Williams	University of California Los Angeles	California State University Long Beach	Founding member of the National Black Nurses Association
2011	Patricia Benner	University of California, Berkeley	University of California San Francisco	Author, From Novice to Expert
2011	Suzanne Feetham		National Institutes of Health	Created the Feetham Family Functioning Survey.
2011	Ada Sue Hinshaw	University of Arizona	University of Michigan	First director of the National Institute of Nursing Research.
2011	Meridean Maas	Iowa State University	University of Iowa	Co-director, Gerontological Nursing Interventions Research Center
2011	May Wykle	Case Western Reserve University	Case Western Reserve University	President, Friends of the National Institute for Nursing Research. Former president of Sigma Theta Tau International.
2012	Anne J. Davis		University of California, San Francisco	Professor emerita at the University of California San Francisco.
2012	Mi Ja Kim	University of Illinois at Chicago	University of Illinois at Chicago	International nursing consultant, member of the CGFNS International Board of Trustees.
2012	Nola Pender	Northwestern University	University of Michigan	Created the Health Promotion Model.
2012	Muriel Poulin	Columbia University	Boston University	Professor emerita at Boston University. Fulbright Scholar in Barcelona.
2013	Clara Leach Adams-Ender	University of Minnesota	Walter Reed Army Medical Center	Former chief of the United States Army Nurse Corps
2013	Hattie Bessent	University of Florida	University of Florida	Led the ANA Ethnic Minority Fellowship Program
2013	Margaret Miles	University of Missouri–Kansas City	University of North Carolina at Chapel Hill	Founding president, Society of Pediatric Nurses
2013	Jean Watson	Lewis Gale School of Nursing	University of Colorado	Nurse theorist and nursing professor who is best known for her Theory of Human Caring
2014	Kathleen Dracup	University of California, San Francisco	University of California, San Francisco	Dean Emeritus, UCSF School of Nursing
2014	Barbara Durand	University of San Francisco	Arizona State University	Former dean, ASU College of Nursing
2014	Bernardine Lacey	Columbia University	Western Michigan University	Honored for her advocacy in health equity and access to care for underserved communities, as well as her leadership in nursing education and public policy.
2014	Colleen Goode	University of Iowa	University of Colorado Denver	Recognized for her work in evidence-based practice, patient safety, and hospital nursing leadership, improving nursing standards and quality of care.
2015	Diane M. Billings	Indiana University	Indiana University	Honored for her contributions to nursing education and instructional technology, particularly in developing online and distance learning for nurses.
2015	Marylin J. Dodd	Wayne State University	University of California, San Francisco	Recognized for her pioneering research in symptom management and oncology nursing, particularly in self-care interventions for cancer patients.
2015	Fannie Jean Gaston-Johansson	University of Gothenburg	Johns Hopkins University, American Academy of Nursing (AAN), World Health Organization (WHO)	Honored as the first African American woman to earn tenure as a full professor at Johns Hopkins University, for her groundbreaking research in pain management and health disparities.
2015	Marie Manthey	University of Minnesota	Creative HealthCare Management	Nurse, author, and entrepreneur. She is recognized as one of the originators of Primary Nursing, an innovative system of nursing care delivery.
2015	Afaf Meleis	University of California, Los Angeles	University of Pennsylvania	Honored for her global contributions to nursing theory, education, and women's health, particularly in transitions theory and international health equity.
2016	Linda Burnes Bolton	University of California, Los Angeles	Cedars-Sinai Medical Center	Recognized for her leadership in healthcare policy, diversity in nursing, and health equity, serving as a key contributor to the Institute of Medicine's Future of Nursing report.
2016	Ann Wolbert Burgess		Boston College	Celebrated for her pioneering work in forensic nursing, victimology, and trauma research, significantly influencing criminal investigations and psychiatric nursing.
2016	Colleen Conway-Welch	New York University	Vanderbilt University School of Nursing	Dean of the Vanderbilt University School of Nursing (VUSN) from 1984 to 2013 and member of President Ronald Reagan's Commission on the HIV Epidemic.
2016	Joyce J. Fitzpatrick			
2016	Martha N. Hill	Johns Hopkins University	Johns Hopkins University	
2017	Linda R. Cronenwett	University of Michigan	University of North Carolina at Chapel Hill, American Academy of Nursing	Recognized for her leadership in nursing education, quality improvement, and patient safety, co-founding the Quality and Safety Education for Nurses (QSEN) initiative.
2017	Elaine L. Larson	University of Washington	Columbia University School of Nursing, Centers for Disease Control and Prevention (CDC), World Health Organization (WHO)	Honored for her groundbreaking research in infection prevention and control, hand hygiene, and antimicrobial resistance, shaping global nursing and public health policies.
2017	Carolyn A. Williams	University of North Carolina at Chapel Hill	American Association of Colleges of Nursing (AACN), University of Kentucky College of Nursing	Awarded for her contributions to public health nursing, nursing education, and health policy, helping to integrate population health into nursing curricula.
2017	Nancy Fugate Woods	University of North Carolina, Chapel Hill	University of Washington, American Academy of Nursing (AAN), National Institutes of Health (NIH)	Recognized for her pioneering research in women's health, aging, and menopause, significantly advancing knowledge in midlife health transitions
2017	Connie Henke Yarbro	University of Missouri-Columbia	Oncology Nursing Society, University of Missouri-Columbia, International Society of Nurses in Cancer Care	Recognized for her pioneering role in oncology nursing, co-founding the Oncology Nursing Society (ONS) in 1975 and establishing the ONS Foundation in 1981, which has provided over $26 million in research grants and awards.
2018	Jacquelyn Campbell	Duke University, Wright State University, University of Rochester	The Johns Hopkins University	Honored for her pioneering research on domestic violence and violence against women, particularly the development of the Danger Assessment tool to evaluate the risk of homicide in abusive relationships.
2018	Marilyn P. Chow	University of California, San Francisco (UCSF)	Kaiser Permanente, Robert Wood Johnson Foundation	Recognized for her leadership in nursing innovation, workforce development, and healthcare policy, particularly in advancing nursing roles in hospital and community settings.
2018	Joanne M. Disch	University of Wisconsin-Madison	American Academy of Nursing (AAN), University of Minnesota School of Nursing	Honored for her contributions to patient safety, leadership development, and healthcare advocacy, shaping policies that improve nurse-led care models.
2018	Ada K. Jacox	Wayne State University, University of Maryland	Institute of Medicine, American Nurses Association (ANA)	Celebrated for her pioneering research in health policy, pain management, and nursing standards, influencing evidence-based practice and patient care guidelines.
2018	Beatrice J. Kalisch	University of Maryland, University of Michigan	University of Michigan School of Nursing, American Academy of Nursing (AAN)	Awarded for her impactful research on nursing workforce issues, missed nursing care, and patient safety, helping to improve nursing efficiency and hospital outcomes.
2018	Sally L. Lusk	University of Michigan	Sigma Theta Tau, American Academy of Nursing, Midwest Nursing Research Society	Known for her study of influences on health behavior of workers exposed to hazardous noise.
2018	Ruth McCorkle	University of Iowa School of Nursing	Yale School of Nursing	Known for her groundbreaking work in oncology nursing and palliative care. She was instrumental in developing patient-centered symptom management models, improving the quality of life for individuals with cancer and chronic illnesses. Her research and leadership significantly advanced the role of nurses in cancer care, hospice, and end-of-life decision-making.
2019	Geraldine "Polly" Bednash	Texas Woman's University; Catholic University of America; University of Maryland		Known for her transformational leadership in nursing education and policy advocacy. As the former CEO of the American Association of Colleges of Nursing (AACN), she played a pivotal role in advancing nursing education standards, including the push for Doctor of Nursing Practice (DNP) programs. Her dedication to strengthening the nursing workforce and promoting evidence-based practice made a lasting impact on healthcare and nursing education.
2019	Catherine Alicia Georges	University of Vermont, New York University, Seton Hall University	AARP, National Black Nurses Association, National Black Nurses Foundation, Lehman College	National Volunteer President of AARP 2018–2020.Former President of the National Black Nurses Association 1987–1991, Current President of the National Black Nurses Foundation. Professor and Chairperson Emerita Lehman College Department of Nursing
2019	Pamela Mitchell	University of Washington	University of Washington School of Nursing, American Academy of Nursing (AAN)	Recognized for her leadership in neuroscience nursing and symptom management research, contributing significantly to improving patient outcomes in critical care settings.
2019	Linda Spoonster Schwartz	Yale University		Honored for her advocacy and policy work in veterans' health care, serving as the Assistant Secretary for Policy and Planning at the U.S. Department of Veterans Affairs.
2019	Mary Wakefield	University of Texas at Austin	Obama administration	Recognized for her contributions to health policy and administration, serving as the Administrator of the Health Resources and Services Administration (HRSA) and as the Acting Deputy Secretary of the U.S. Department of Health and Human Services.
2020	Linda Harman Aiken	University of Texas at Austin		Celebrated for her pioneering research in nursing outcomes and healthcare policy, founding the Magnet Recognition Program to promote excellence in nursing.
2020	Bobbie Berkowitz	University of Washington; Case Western Reserve University	Columbia University School of Nursing	American professor of nursing and dean emeritus of the Columbia University School of Nursing
2020	Kathleen (Kitty) Buckwalter			Recognized for her contributions to geriatric nursing and mental health, particularly her research on dementia care and family caregiving.
2020	Beverly Malone	University of Cincinnati; Rutgers University in Newark		Honored for her leadership in nursing education and global health policy, serving as the CEO of the National League for Nursing and former General Secretary of the Royal College of Nursing in the UK.
2020	Marilyn Rantz	University of Wisconsin-Milwaukee	University of Missouri	Celebrated for her pioneering work in nursing home care quality and aging in place, leading initiatives to improve elder care through research and technology.
2021	Betty Ferrell	Central State University;University of Oklahoma;Texas Woman's University;Claremont Graduate University	Oncology Nursing Society; City of Hope, Duarte, CA	Recognized for her extensive contributions to palliative care and nursing ethics, particularly her research on pain management and end-of-life care.
2021	Terry Fulmer	Skidmore College; Boston College Connell School of Nursing	John A. Hartford Foundation; Northeastern University Bouvé College of Health Sciences; New York University Rory Meyers College of Nursing	Honored for her leadership in geriatric nursing and healthcare policy, serving as the President of The John A. Hartford Foundation and advancing age-friendly health systems
2021	Susan Hassmiller	Florida State University; University of Nebraska Medical Center; George Mason University	Robert Wood Johnson Foundation; National Academy of Medicine; AARP	Celebrated for her efforts in nursing leadership and health policy, notably her role as the Senior Advisor for Nursing at the Robert Wood Johnson Foundation and involvement in the Future of Nursing reports.
2021	Marla Salmon	Johns Hopkins Bloomberg School of Public Health; University of Portland	University of Washington; Emory University; World Health Organization	Honored for her contributions to global health and nursing education, serving as the Dean of Emory University's Nell Hodgson Woodruff School of Nursing and the University of Washington School of Nursing, and for her work with the World Health Organization.
2022	Jane Barnsteiner	University of Pennsylvania; University of Michigan	University of Pennsylvania; American Journal of Nursing; Children's Hospital of Philadelphia	Celebrated for her pioneering work in patient safety and quality improvement in nursing, particularly through her involvement with the Quality and Safety Education for Nurses (QSEN) initiative.
2022	William L. Holzemer	Syracuse University; Miami University; San Francisco State University	Rutgers School of Nursing; University of California, San Francisco; Japan Journal of Nursing Science; International Nursing Network for HIV/AIDS Research	Made significant contributions to nursing education and research, particularly in the areas of HIV/AIDS care and global health, and for his leadership roles at Rutgers University and the University of California, San Francisco.
2022	Jeanette Ives Erickson	MGH Institute of Health Professions; Boston University; Westbrook College	Massachusetts General Hospital; Nantucket Cottage Hospital; Mass General Brigham	Honored for her leadership in nursing practice and healthcare administration, notably as the Chief Nurse and Senior Vice President for Patient Care Services at Massachusetts General Hospital, and for her contributions to nursing education.
2022	Norma Martinez Rogers	University of Texas at Austin; University of Texas Health Science Center at San Antonio; St. Mary's University, Texas; University of the Incarnate Word	National Association of Hispanic Nurses; University of Texas Health Science Center at San Antonio School of Nursing;	Celebrated for her advocacy for diversity in nursing and her work in mentoring programs to support underrepresented nursing students, as well as her tenure as President of the National Association of Hispanic Nurses.
2022	Joyce Newman Giger	UCLA School of Nursing	UCLA School of Nursing; United States Army Reserve; National Black Nurses Association	Recognized for her contributions to transcultural nursing and cultural diversity in healthcare, authoring the widely used "Transcultural Nursing" textbook, and for her leadership in nursing education.
2022	Franklin A. Shaffer	Mercer Hospital, New Jersey; Teachers College, Columbia University	TruMerit, formerly CGFNS; FNINR - Friends of the National Institute of Nursing Research	Recognized for global efforts around standards-setting and credentials evaluation for nursing and allied health professions. Led acceptance of men in nursing and removing barriers for other groups not traditionally involved in nursing.
2023	Janice C. Brewington	North Carolina A&T State University; emory University	North Carolina A&T State University; National League for Nursing	Recognized for building leadership capacity throughout her career and extending best nursing practices to all patients.
2023	Pamela F. Cipriano	University of Utah; University of Washington; American University	University of Virginia School of Nursing; University of Virginia Health System; International Council of Nurses	Celebrated for her efforts to increase nursing’s involvement in health care delivery, policy and health promotion, including establishment of ‘Healthy Nurse, Healthy Nation’ initiative to improve Nurse well-being.
2023	Martha A.Q. Curley	Boston College; Yale University; University of Massachusetts Amherst	University of Pennsylvania School of Nursing; Children's Hospital of Philadelphia	Recognized for her contributions to advance the discipline of pediatric critical care focused on holistic patient and family needs. Her work demonstrates the positive impact of bedside nursing.
2023	Mary O'Neil Mundinger	Columbia University	Columbia University School of Nursing; Department of Veteran Affairs	Founded the first nursing school faculty practice at Columbia University School of Nursing. Engaged nursing's voice in larger conversations including within healthcare companies and federal advisory appointments.
2023	Madeline A. Naegle	New York University	New York University Rory Meyers College of Nursing	Celebrated for her work supporting the integration of behavioral health in nursing; she was involved in support and peer assistance for to strengthen well-being of nurses.
2023	Adey M. Nyamathi	Case Western Reserve University; Stony Brook University; Hunter-Bellevue School of Nursing	University of California, Irvine	Honored for her research around the positive impact of nurse-led community health models for communities impacted by homelessness; critical diseases including HIV/AIDS, tuberculosis and hepatitis; and interactions with the criminal justice system.
2024	Suzanne Bakken	Stanford University; University of California, San Francisco; Arizona State University	Columbia University	Honored for her work in biomedical informatics as relates to reducing health disparities, patient safety and improved health outcomes.
2024	Rita K. Chow	George Mason University; Columbia University; Case Western Reserve University Stanford University	U.S. Public Health Service; Indian Health Service; US Army Reserves	Honored for her wide-ranging work within government to improve patient health outcomes and increase awareness and respect for critical care nursing.
2024	Julie Fairman	University of Pennsylvania	University of Pennsylvania School of Nursing	Recognized for her work as historian and scholar investigating the relationship between the practice and impact of nursing and human rights.
2024	Faye Gary	University of Florida, Gainesville; Saint Xavier University; Florida A&M University	Case Western Reserve University	Honored for her work connecting and supporting the next generating of nurses and improving the profession.
2024	Mathy Mezey	Columbia University	New York University College of Nursing; University of Pennsylvania School of Nursing	Recognized for her work in the fields of nursing ethics and geriatric nursing, instituting foundational landmarks to support optimal nursing practice.
2025	Dyanne D. Affonso	University of Arizona	University of Toronto	Recognized for widespread impacts on nursing globally, including founding ‘Centers of Excellence for Nursing Scholarship’ in multiple locations.
2025	Connie W. Delaney	University of Utah; University of Iowa	University of Minnesota School of Nursing	Honored for her success in advancing nursing informatics, education and health care innovation.
2025	Judith E. Haber	New York University; Adelphi University	New York University Rory Meyers College of Nursing	Recognized for breakthroughs in psychiatric-mental health nursing as well as supporting the integration of oral health into nursing.
2025	Christine A. Miaskowski	St. John's University (New York City);	UCSF School of Nursing	Honored for her work with expanding the sciences of pain management and symptom clusters within the fields of oncology and chronic illness.
2025	Brother Ignatius Perkins, OP	Spalding University; Catholic University of America	Providence College	Honored for his work incorporating ethics, faith and advocacy in nursing, including via his Trilogy of Health Care model.
2025	Phyllis Sharps	University of Utah; University of Iowa	Johns Hopkins School of Nursing	Recognized for her work in maternal and infant health and her extensive mentorship activities.
2026	Ernest J. Grant	University of North Carolina at Greensboro; North Carolina Central University	American Nurses Association	Honored for his work focused on burn care and prevention at a system-wide scale, especially regarding the most severe needs cases including war injuries.
2026	Margaret Heitkemper	University of Illinois Chicago; University of Washington; Seattle University	University of Washington School of Nursing	Recognized for her scientific work around sleep and digestive health and her development of nurse-led science in general.
2026	Bernadette Mazurek Melnyk	University of Rochester; University of Pittsburgh; West Virginia University	Ohio State University	Honored for her research and transformational process support for mental health and overall health and wellness services globally.
2026	Susan Reinhard	Rutgers University; University of Cincinnati	RWJBarnabas Health	Recognized for her research-based innovations in nursing practices in the disciplines of long-term care for older adults, persons with disabilities, and the family members who care for them.
2026	Kevin Sowers	Duke University School of Nursing; Capital University	Johns Hopkins Hospital; Johns Hopkins School of Medicine	Honored for his leadership across complex systems driven by his grounding in the values and practices of Nursing.
2026	Eileen Sullivan-Marx	University of Pennsylvania School of Nursing; University of Rochester	New York University Rory Meyers College of Nursing	Recognized for her work increasing the quality of health care available to older adults, veterans and others including within the Medicare/Medicaid system.
