= Catherine Alicia Georges =

Zimbabwean LGBTIQ+ activist

- Born: February 14, 1944 (age 82); St. Thomas, U.S. Virgin Islands
- Education: Seton Hall University College of Nursing (BSN); New York University School of Education (MA); University of Vermont (Ed.D)
- Occupations: Nurse, professor, nonprofit executive
- Organisation: AARP
- Awards: Living Legend

Catherine Alicia Georges, EdD, RN, FAAN, (born February 14, 1944) is an American registered nurse, professor, and nonprofit executive. She served as the volunteer president of the AARP from 2018 through 2020 and has been recognized as a Living Legend by the American Academy of Nursing.

== Early life and education ==
Georges was born on February 14, 1944 on St. Thomas in the U.S. Virgin Islands. Growing up on St. Thomas, she attended and graduated from Sts. Peter & Paul School. The post office in Frenchtown is named after her father, Arturo Watlington Sr. Georges went on to earn her Bachelor of Science in Nursing from Seton Hall University College of Nursing in 1965, followed by a Master of Arts from New York University School of Education in 1973. She later earned her Doctor of Education from the University of Vermont in 2001.

== Career ==
In 1965, Georges joined the Visiting Nurse Service of New York, and worked there as a nurse, supervisor, and district director through 1975. She worked as a lecturer at Lehman College and later became chair of the Department of Nursing. Georges served as president of the National Black Nurses Association from 1987 to 1991. She also served as president of the board of the Commission on Graduates of Foreign Nursing Schools.

Georges has a long association with the AARP, serving on its board from 2010 through 2020 and as volunteer president from 2018 through 2020. She has also spoken about the impact to the nursing profession as the senior citizen population continues to increase. During the COVID-19 pandemic, Georges worked to dispel COVID-19 misinformation and advocated for vaccine access for residents in the Bronx.

Georges is a fellow of the American Academy of Nursing (FAAN) and has also served as president of the National Black Nurses Foundation.

== Awards and honors ==
Georges has been honored with multiple awards over her career, including the Mary Mahoney Award, the Jane Delano Distinguished Service Award, and the Mabel Staupers Award. In 2019, she was named a Living Legend by the American Academy of Nursing for her "extraordinary contributions to the nursing profession". In 2020, she received the Distinguished Alumna Award from Seton Hall.
