= Geraldine Bednash =

American nurse practitioner (born 1943)

Polly Bednash
- Born: Geraldine Parrott; 1943 (age 82–83); Texas
- Occupation: Nurse
- Spouse: Thomas Francis Bednash (m. 1967)

Academic background
- Education: BSN, nursing, 1965, Texas Woman's University; MSc, nursing, Catholic University of America; PhD, higher education policy and law, 1989, University of Maryland

Geraldine "Polly" Bednash (née Parrott; born 1943) is an American nurse practitioner. She is the former chief executive officer of the American Association of Colleges of Nursing and former head of the association's legislative and regulatory advocacy programs as director of government affairs.

== Early life and education ==
Bednash was born in rural Texas where there were limited opportunities for women. She chose to enrol at Texas Woman's University (TWU) to become a nurse after her best friend chose the career. Bednash graduated from TWU in 1965 with a bachelor's degree in nursing and was named a Distinguished Alumna in 1997. Following this, she married T.F. Bednash and joined the United States Army Nurse Corps travelling to Vietnam.

Upon returning to North America, Bednash enrolled in a Master's degree nursing program at Catholic University of America and earned her PhD in higher education policy and law at the University of Maryland.

== Career ==
Bednash served as the chief executive officer and executive director of the American Association of Colleges of Nursing from December 1989 until June 15, 2014. While serving in this role, she was "credited with establishing AACN as the national voice for baccalaureate and graduate nursing education" and grew membership from 411 member schools to 742 schools.

She was among the founding members of the Global Alliance for Nursing Education and Science and facilitated nursing exchanges throughout Australia, New Zealand, the United Kingdom and the United States. Prior to her retirement, Bednash was chosen to receive the National League for Nursing President's Award in acknowledgement of her "stature and distinction within nursing education and the wider stage of American health care."

Following her retirement as CEO, Bednash served on the Board of the Arnold P. Gold Foundation from 2014 until 2018. In 2019, Bednash was appointed to the Board of Stewardship Trustees for Common Spirit Health and was honored by the American Academy of Nursing as a "Living Legend" in recognition of her "work advancing nursing education." She was honored by the Arnold P. Gold Foundation at the 2019 International Nurses Day at the United Nations.
