= Marlene Kramer =

American nurse, educator and author

- Died: 2022
- Education: St. Louis University
- Occupations: Nurse, author
- Known for: Reality Shock: Why Nurses Leave Nursing

Marlene F. Kramer was an American nurse, educator and author. She wrote a 1974 book, Reality Shock: Why Nurses Leave Nursing, which examined burnout in the nursing profession. Her book has been widely cited in subsequent studies on retention and satisfaction within nursing.

== Biography ==
Marlene Kramer received an undergraduate degree in nursing from St. Louis University in 1953. She completed a Master of Science in nursing at Case Western Reserve University in 1958 and a PhD in sociology and education at Stanford University in 1966.

Several years after completing the doctorate, Kramer taught at the University of California, San Francisco. Kramer left UCSF to become dean at the University of Connecticut in 1979. In 1983, while still serving as dean at Connecticut, Kramer filed a libel lawsuit against seven of the university's nursing faculty members and the director of the faculty union. The faculty members had previously submitted complaints to the university alleging that Kramer plagiarized material and mismanaged the department. Kramer remained at UConn until 1987.

Kramer developed the concept of reality shock while studying the retention of new nurses. She identified role conflict as a major stressor for new nurses as they struggled to balance the needs of each patient with the pressures and responsibilities imposed by the work setting.

In 2007, Kramer earned the Living Legend designation from the American Academy of Nursing. A University of Connecticut alumni award for nursing research is named after Kramer. The Academy of Medical-Surgical Nurses awarded the 2012 Anthony J. Jannetti Award, its highest honor, to Kramer.

== Selected works ==
=== Books ===
- Kramer, Marlene (1974). Reality Shock: Why Nurses Leave Nursing.

=== Journal articles ===
- Schmalenburg, Claudia and Marlene Kramer (February 2009). Nurse-Physician Relationships in Hospitals: 20,000 Nurses Tell Their Story. Critical Care Nurse. 29 (1):74-83.
- Schmalenburg, Claudia and Marlene Kramer (January 2003). Magnet Hospital Staff Nurses Describe Clinical Autonomy. Nursing Outlook. 51 (1):13-19.

== See also ==
- List of Living Legends of the American Academy of Nursing
