= Barbara L. Nichols =

American nurse and administrator (1939–2026)

26th President of the American Nurses Association
- In office 1978–1982

Personal details
- Born: July 19, 1939 Waterville, Maine, U.S.
- Died: July 22, 2026 (aged 87)
- Education: University of Wisconsin–Madison
- Occupation: Nurse executive
- Known for: Being the first black president of the American Nurses Association

Barbara L. Nichols (July 19, 1939 – July 22, 2026) was an American nurse leader and was the first black president of the American Nurses Association. A graduate of Case Western Reserve University and the University of Wisconsin–Madison, Nichols was a CEO of CGFNS International, a president of the Wisconsin Nurses Association and a Living Legend of the American Academy of Nursing.

== Early life and education ==
Nichols grew up in Maine and attended the Massachusetts Memorial School of Nursing and earned a bachelor's degree in nursing from Case Western Reserve University. She worked at Boston Children's Hospital before joining the United States Navy. Nichols said that in her early days as a nurse, she felt that her opinions were sometimes ignored because of her race, and she said that these experiences pushed her to become a nurse leader.

== Career ==
At the U.S. Naval Hospital in St. Albans, Queens, Nichols was a head nurse. After leaving the Navy Nurse Corps, Nichols moved to Wisconsin, where she worked as a nurse at St. Mary's Hospital in Madison. In 1970, Nichols became president of the Wisconsin Nurses Association. As of 2013, she was still the only black president in the organization's history.

Nichols earned a master's degree at the University of Wisconsin–Madison. She became the first black president of the American Nurses Association (ANA) in 1979. While she served as ANA president, Nichols continued working at St. Mary's Hospital, serving as the hospital's director of inservice education, planning and implementing educational opportunities for hospital staff members. After her service as ANA president, Nichols was named secretary of the Wisconsin Department of Regulation and Licensing; with that appointment she became the first black female in Wisconsin to hold a state Cabinet-level role.

From the late 1990s until her retirement in 2011, Nichols was the CEO of CGFNS International, an organization that evaluates educational credentials of graduates of foreign nursing schools. Nichols saw a two-fold purpose for CGFNS: to protect the public by ensuring the adequate preparation of nurses and the protection of immigrant nurses from exploitation. Nichols held faculty appointments at the University of Wisconsin–Madison and Excelsior College, and she served on the board of directors of the American National Standards Institute.

== Personal life and death ==
Larry Nichols, Barbara's husband, is a retired employee of the Madison Metropolitan School District. In 2015, one of her children, Nichelle, became the district's engagement chief.

Nichols died on July 22, 2026, at the age of 87.

== Honors and awards ==
In 2010, Nichols was named a Living Legend of the American Academy of Nursing. She was inducted into the Institute of Excellence of the National Black Nurses Association. She was a past recipient of the Mary Mahoney Award from the ANA. She received an honorary Doctor of Science from the University of Wisconsin–Milwaukee in 1979.
