= Jo Eleanor Elliott =

American nurse

Jo Eleanor Elliott (5 October 1923 – 1 May 2011) was a nurse based in the United States. She received the Living Legend Award from the American Nurses Association and was the head of the American Nurses Association. She was also led the Department of Health and Human Service's Division of Nursing, effectively as the nation's top nurse. Elliot advocated for nursing education and encouraged nursing degrees and higher education degrees for nursing.

== Life ==
Elliott was born in La Monte, Missouri in 1923 to parents E. Stanton and Kathryn Knight Elliott. She had four siblings. She was an active member of her local Christian church, the Community United Church of Christ. She died in May 2011 in a Boulder, Colorado hospital at age 87.

== Education ==
Elliott attended high school in Warrensburg, Missouri and graduated as the valedictorian of her high school in 1941. She then attended Central Missouri State College, small, two-year teacher's college located in Missouri; from 1941 until 1943. In 1947, Elliott earned her bachelor's degree in nursing from the University of Michigan after transferring there from Central Missouri State College. While a student at the University of Michigan, she was a member of the United States Cadet Nurse Corps from 1944 until 1947. In 1953, she received a master's degree in nursing education from the University of Chicago. Her master's thesis was entitled "A History of the University of Michigan School of Nursing," and was completed in 1953.

== Career ==
Elliott joined the University of Michigan faculty and taught at the University of Michigan from 1947 until 1952. She was an instructor in Nursing (Nursing Arts) from 1947 to 1948, and thereafter an instructor in Nursing (Surgical) from 1948 to 1952. She left the University of Michigan to pursue a master's degree in nursing education. After graduating, she became a faculty member at the University of California, Los Angeles. She was the head of the Western Council on Higher Education for Nursing from 1957 to 1980. This council was a collection of over 150 schools of nursing across 13 states. She advocated for continuing education, graduate education, and basic education for nurses; and helped to cultivate loans and scholarships for nurses. Her work with the Western Council on Higher Education for Nursing was perhaps the first work done in evaluation of continuing education in the United States. The council launched a 12-year initiative for continuing education for nurses. Over 3,000 nurses completed continuing education programs through the council. Elliott also participated in numerous research projects and conferences about higher education for nurses. She developed many of her plans in collaboration with Lulu Wolf Hassenplug, who worked then at the University of California, Los Angeles and Pearl Coulter, who worked at the University of Arizona. Elliott considered Hassenplug to be her mentor in her endeavors for advocating for continuing education.

Elliott served as the president of the American Nursing Association from 1964 until 1968. She helped to advocate support for Medicare in the United States. She was the youngest ANA member to serve as president at that time. In 1964, she helped to pass the Nurse Training Act to Aid Professional Nursing Education. In 1965, Elliott along with the American Nursing Association controversially advocated for nurses to have at least a baccalaureate degree in nursing, and an associate degree for technical nursing. Elliott argued that this was essential for the field of nursing to evolve with the needs of patients, and scientific knowledge, in mind. Also in 1965, she was present when the Medicare bill was signed into law. She also helped to set minimum salaries for nurses, devised a revised Code for Nurses, helped to overhaul the structure of the American Nursing Association, established practice divisions in the American Nursing Association, and created the Congress on Nursing Practice. She was re-elected head of the American Nursing Association on June 17, 1966. Elliott was the United States' Department of Health And Human Services's director of the Division of Nursing from 1980 - 1989. Elliott headed the International Council of Nurses from 1965 until 1969. Elliott was a member of Sigma Theta Tau. She taught at several universities, including the University of California, Los Angeles, the University of Texas, San Antonio, Loyola University Chicago, and The University of Michigan.

== Honors ==
In 1966, Elliott was named a Woman of Achievement in the first annual Colorado Woman of Achievement ceremony. She was one of three selected out of a pool of 102 women throughout Colorado that were nominated. In 1974, Elliott received an honor for Distinguished Leadership in Continuing Education in Nursing at the Sixth National Conference on Continuing Education in Nursing. She was nominated for this award by her peers in the field. In 1987, she received a Distinguished Alumni Athena Award from the University of Michigan. In 1997, the American Academy of Nursing named Elliott a Living Legend, which is the organization's highest award. The University of Michigan established the Jo Eleanor Elliott Scholarship Fund in their school of nursing. In 1988, the Western Institute of Nursing established the Jo Eleanor Elliott Leadership Award, which has been awarded continuously every year since. In 2010, then-President Barack Obama praised her for her lifelong contributions to, and advocacy for, healthcare. In 2010, the National League for Nursing gave her the "President's Award: Champion in the Shaping of Nursing Education." Elliott was the recipient of six honorary doctorates. She also received the American Nursing Association's Distinguished Membership Award.
