= Linda Spoonster Schwartz =

American nurse

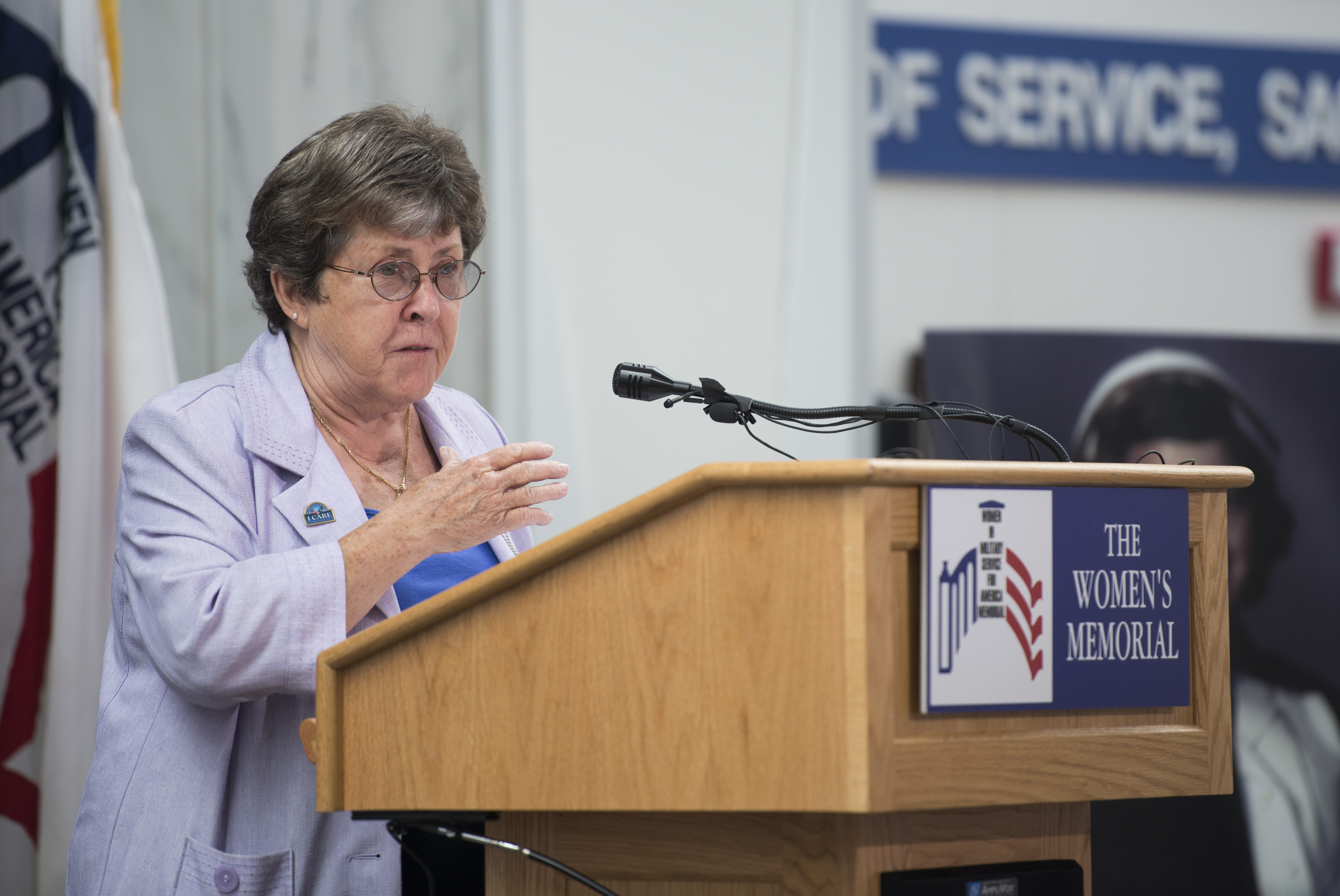
- Schwartz in 2015
- Born: 1944 (age 81–82)
- Education: Yale School of Nursing; Yale School of Medicine; University of Maryland
- Occupations: Flight nurse, veteran advocate
- Military career
- Allegiance: United States
- Branch: United States Army Air Forces
- Service years: 1969–1986
- Rank: Captain
- Conflicts: Vietnam War

Linda Spoonster Schwartz (born 1944) is an American nurse and veteran advocate. A Vietnam War veteran with the Air Force, she is the former Assistant Secretary for Policy and Planning at the Department of Veterans Affairs.

== Early life and education ==
Schwartz was born in 1944 and grew up in Ohio; her father served aboard the USS Susan B. Anthony in World War II. She graduated as a nurse from the St. Thomas Hospital School of Nursing in Ohio and later earned her master's degree from the Yale School of Nursing and a Doctor of Public Health from the Yale School of Medicine. Her doctoral thesis studied the high rate of "cancer and other diseases" faced by women who fought in wars. During her military career, Schwartz earned a Bachelor of Science degree in both psychology and sociology from the University of Maryland.

== Career ==
Schwartz joined the United States Air Force in 1967. Initially assigned to Tachikawa Air Base in Japan, she served in the Vietnam War, including treating casualties from the Battle of Hamburger Hill. After the war, Schwartz attended flight school and became a Captain and was stationed in Europe before returning to Connecticut.

After transitioning to the United States Air Force Reserve, Schwartz joined the 69th Air Evac Squadron out of McGuire Air Force Base. In 1983, she was flying a training mission at 30,000 feet and was injured in a blast concussion when one of the plane's doors blew off. Experiencing "stroke-like" symptoms and paralyzed on the left-side of her body, Schwartz sought assistance from the United States Department of Veterans Affairs (VA). Schwartz says it took over 3 years to get access to VA benefits, stating that "they were not really prepared for women".

This is not a mere question of money, cosmetics in the canteen, or the availability of services. Before us is a question of honor. How does a nation honor, how does a state honor, how does an individual honor the achievements, sacrifices, contributions of... its citizens who are women veterans?

— Schwartz in testimony to the US Congress in 1987

In 1987, Schwartz testified before the US Congress about the state of care for women veterans, going on to testify before Congress more than 24 times over the course of her career. From 2003 through 2014, she served as the Connecticut Commissioner of Veterans Affairs. She has been critical of former secretary of defense Donald Rumsfeld for trying to do "war on the cheap". In 2013, President Obama nominated Schwartz to be Assistant Secretary of Veterans Affairs for Policy and Planning.

Schwartz has served on the boards of both the Vietnam Veterans of America and the Vietnam Women's Memorial.

== Awards and honors ==
- In 2004, Schwartz was inducted into the Ohio Veterans Hall of Fame
- In 2018, Schwartz was selected as an Honoree by the National Women's History Project
- In 2019, Schwartz was named a Living Legend by the American Academy of Nursing
- In 2025, Schwartz was honored as a Women's Veteran Trailblazer by the Center for Women Veterans
