= Meridean Maas =

American nurse (1934–2020)

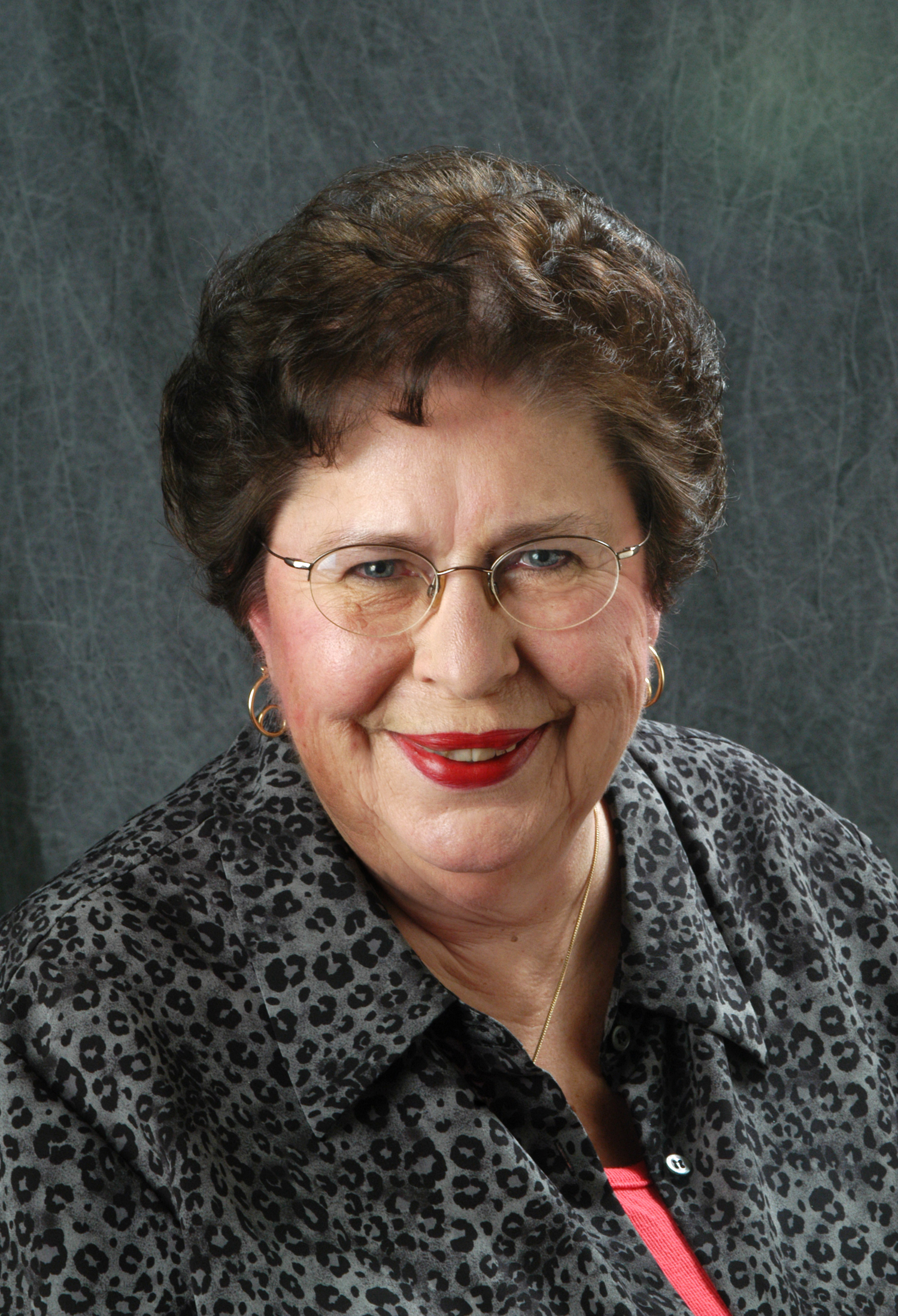
- Meridean Maas's professional headshot
- Born: Meridean Speas; June 11, 1934; Marshalltown, Iowa
- Died: November 13, 2020; Iowa City, Iowa
- Occupation(s): Nurse, nursing educator

Meridean Leone Maas (June 11, 1934 – November 13, 2020), born Meridean Speas, was an American nurse and nursing educator. She was on the faculty of the University of Iowa College of Nursing.

== Early life ==
Meridean Speas was born in Marshalltown, Iowa, the daughter of Kenneth Speas and Miriam Johnson Speas. She earned bachelor's and master's degrees in nursing at the University of Iowa. She trained as a rehabilitation nurse at the Texas Woman's University, and completed a PhD in sociology at Iowa State University in 1979, with a dissertation titled "A formal theory of organizational power".

== Career ==
Maas worked as a nurse in Chicago while her husband was in graduate school there, and was Director of Nursing at the Evangelical Hospital and School of Nursing in her hometown. As a consultant at the Iowa Soldiers Home in 1965, she worked with Ada Jacox and they co-wrote a textbook, Guidelines for Nurse Autonomy/Patient Welfare (1977). In 1969, she became the first nurse to serve on the Iowa Board of Health. She became a professor of nursing at the University of Iowa in 1983. She was co-director of the John A. Hartford Center for Geriatric Nursing Excellence, and of the Gerontological Nursing Interventions Research Center (GNIRC).

She was first author on the textbook Nursing Diagnoses and Interventions for the Elderly (1991), revised as Nursing Care of Older Adults: Diagnoses, Outcomes & Interventions (2001). She served on several editorial boards of journals in her field. Her research in gerontological nursing often involved studies of institutional and family care for patients with Alzheimer's disease, and was published in journals including The American Journal of Alzheimer's Disease and Other Dementias, Journal of Nursing Measurement, Journal of Gerontological Nursing, and Nursing Outlook.

Maas and another University of Iowa nursing professor, Janet Specht, owned Liberty Country Living, a nursing home in North Liberty, Iowa. Liberty Country Living opened in 1998 and was used as a nurse training site until it closed in 2003. In 2006, Maas and Specht were the first recipients of the Edge Runners Award from the American Academy of Nursing. In 2011, she was named a Living Legend by the American Academy of Nursing.

== Personal life and legacy ==
Meridean Speas married optometrist Richard Rolland Maas in 1954. They had three children. Her husband died from pancreatic cancer in April 2020, and she died in November 2020, aged 86 years, at her home in Iowa City, Iowa. The Mennonite College of Nursing at Illinois State University has a Dr. Meridean Maas Faculty Research Mentor Award, named in her honor.
