= Harriet Werley =

American nurse

- Born: Harriet Helen Werley
- Occupation: nursing informatician

Harriet Helen Werley (October 12, 1914 – October 14, 2002) was an American nurse who made early contributions to clinical research and nursing informatics. Werley became the first nurse researcher at the Walter Reed Army Institute of Research and the Army Nurse Corps converted to a baccalaureate-prepared group under her leadership. She was a founding editor of Research in Nursing and Health. She co-created the Nursing Minimum Data Set in 1991.

== Biography ==
Werley was born on October 12, 1914, in Berks County, Pennsylvania. Though her father died when she was young and she grew up poor, Werley was able to complete a diploma from the Jefferson Hospital School of Nursing in 1940. She joined the Army Nurse Corps the following year and served in the Mediterranean during World War II. Werley completed an undergraduate degree from the University of California, Berkeley between 1946 and 1948. She returned to an active military duty and completed a graduate degree in nursing administration in 1951. While in leadership roles with the Army Nurse Corps between 1951 and 1955, Werley moved the corps to an entirely baccalaureate-prepared group. She then developed a nursing research department at the Walter Reed Army Institute of Research. Werley retired from the military in 1964 as chief nurse of the US Eighth Army.

She completed a doctorate in 1969 from the University of Utah. After leaving the military, Werley was on the nursing faculty at Wayne State University, the University of Illinois at Chicago (1974 to 1979), the University of Missouri (1979 to 1983) and the University of Wisconsin–Milwaukee (1983 to 1997). During her academic career, Werley became a founding editor of Research in Nursing and Health and she helped to create a data classification system known as the Nursing Minimum Data Set. Werley was named a Charter Fellow of the American Academy of Nursing in 1973; she was designated a Living Legend by the organization in 1994. She became a Fellow of the American College of Medical Informatics in 1991.

== Legacy ==
The University of Wisconsin–Milwaukee is home to the Harriet H. Werley Center for Nursing Research and Evaluation. The Midwest Nursing Research Society awards the Harriet H. Werley New Investigator Award. The American Medical Informatics Association also confers a Harriet H. Werley Award to a nurse-authored paper at its annual symposium. She was named a Living Legend by the American Academy of Nursing in 1994.

== See also ==
- List of Living Legends of the American Academy of Nursing
