= Mary Woody =

American nurse and university professor

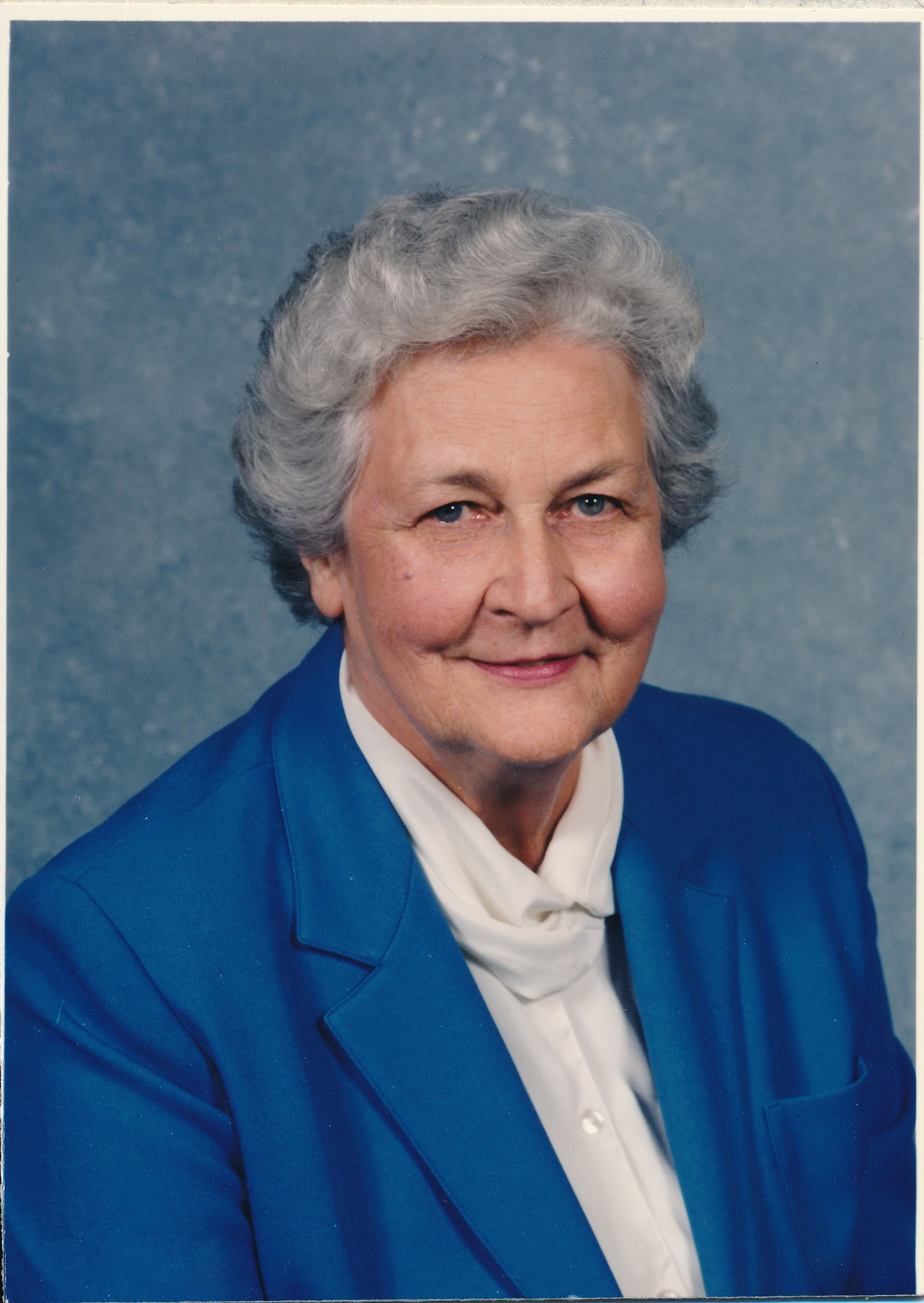
- Born: Mary Florence Woody; March 31, 1926; LaFayette, Alabama
- Died: April 28, 2010 (aged 84); Decatur, Georgia
- Education: Columbia University
- Occupations: Nursing professor and administrator

Mary Florence Woody (March 31, 1926 – April 28, 2010) was an American nurse, hospital administrator and university professor. She worked as a director of nursing at two large hospitals and was a nursing school dean or associate dean at Auburn University and Emory University. She was designated a Living Legend of the American Academy of Nursing.

== Early life and education ==
Mary Florence Woody was born to Hugh Ernest and May Lillie (Gilliland) Woody in LaFayette, Alabama, where she grew up on her family's farm. Her father also owned a gristmill and a general store, where Woody often worked in her youth. She had with five older siblings.

Woody was inspired to pursue nursing by the violent events of World War II. After graduating from high school, she completed Cadet Nurse Corps training at Charity Hospital in New Orleans in 1947.

Before pursuing higher degrees in nursing, Woody worked for as a staff nurse for five years in three different hospitals. In 1948, she joined the staff at Wheeler Hospital in Lafayette, Alabama. Then, in 1949, she transferred to the acute polio unit at Willard Parker Hospital in New York City. One year later, she moved to Montgomery, Alabama, where she served as a nurse and supervisor at the VA Hospital until 1953.

Woody then moved back to New York where she earned a B.A. in nursing in 1954 from Columbia University and a master's degree in nursing service administration in 1955 from Teachers College, Columbia University.

== Career ==
After completing her master's degree, Woody worked for a year as a faculty member and field supervisor in the division of nursing at Teachers College, Columbia University. She then returned to the South, where she served as the assistant director for medical and surgical nursing Emory University Hospital in Atlanta, Georgia between 1956 and 1968. During this time, Woody also worked as a co-instructor for the master's program in nursing supervision at the Nell Hodgson Woodruff School of Nursing.

In 1968, Woody left Emory to accept the positions of assistant hospital director and director of nursing at Grady Memorial Hospital. She would continue to serve in these positions until 1979. While working at Grady, Woody helped create a diabetes day care program, specialized nurse-managed clinics, and a patient education program. She also established clinical specialist positions in pediatrics, psychiatry, surgical rehabilitation, and burns. Woody also recruited Elizabeth Sharp to found Grady's first nurse midwifery program. Throughout her time at Grady, Woody retained her role as an assistant professor of nursing at the Nell Hodgson Woodruff School of Nursing.

In 1979, she became the founding dean at the Auburn University School of Nursing. Over the course of the five years she served in this position, Woody helped develop a practice oriented undergraduate nursing program.

Woody returned to Emory University in 1984 to serve as both the director of nursing and the associate hospital director. During this period, she also served as the associate dean of the Nell Hodgson Woodruff School of Nursing. During this period at Emory, Woody helped to established a collaborative model that allowed hospital nurses to teach students and nursing faculty to maintain a clinical practice. She also created several new positions for nurses in transplantation medicine and pain and incontinence management.

On September 15, 1992 Woody was named the interim dean of the nursing Nell Hodgson Woodruff School of Nursing. She held this position for one year. Woody retired from nursing on October 1, 1993, at the age of 67.

Throughout her career, Woody advocated for the integration of professional associations in nursing. She led the integration of the American Nurses Association.

She also served on numerous committees over the years. Most notably, she served as the chairperson and board of directors of the American Journal of Nursing Company. She also served as a charter fellow of the American Academy of Nursing and a member of the board of directors of Wesley Homes. Woody also held numerous professional memberships including the American Academy of Nursing, National League for Nursing, the American Nurses' Association. Woody published several articles and essays. Her works were often featured in the American Journal of Nursing. In 1973, Woody also a co-authored the book Applying the Problem-Oriented System with John Willis Hurst and Henry Kenneth Walker.

Nursing students at Auburn University can be considered for the Mary F. Woody Alumni Endowed Scholarship.

== Later life ==
Woody died in 2010 of congestive heart failure at an assisted living facility in Decatur, Georgia.

== Honors and awards ==
- Certificate of Special Recognition (1978) - Georgia Nurses’ Association
- Distinguished Nursing Achievement Award (1991) - Nell Hodgson Woodruff School of Nursing
- Alumni Achievement Award for Nursing Service (1992) - Teachers College, Columbia University
- Distinguished emeritus professor - Emory University
- Distinguished Nursing Achievement Award (1994) - Nell Hodgson Woodruff School of Nursing
- Honorary Alumnus Award (1995) - Nell Hodgson Woodruff School of Nursing
- Living Legend Award (1997) - American Academy of Nursing
- Marie Hippensteel Lingeman Award for Excellence in Nursing Practice (1999) - Sigma Theta Tau nursing honor society
- Named one of 50 “Women Pioneers in Health Care in Georgia” (1999) - the state of Georgia
- Inducted into the Nursing Hall of Fame (1999) - Teachers College, Columbia University
- Inducted into the Alabama Health Care Hall of Fame (2008)

== See also ==
- List of Living Legends of the American Academy of Nursing
