= Marilyn Rantz =

American gerontology researcher

- Born: May 22, 1950 (age 76); East St. Louis, Illinois, US
- Spouse: Wally
- Children: 2

Academic background
- Education: BS, University of Illinois; MA, University of Wisconsin–Whitewater; MS(N), 1981, Marquette University; PhD, 1992, University of Wisconsin–Milwaukee
- Thesis: Analysis of changes in chronically confused nursing home residents' status subsequent to OBRA 87 implementation (1992)

Academic work
- Institutions: University of Missouri

Marilyn Jean Rantz (born May 22, 1950) is an American gerontology researcher. She was the Helen E. Nahm Chair at MU Sinclair School of Nursing at the University of Missouri from 2008 until 2015.

In 2020, Rantz was named a "Living Legend" by the American Academy of Nursing for her research efforts which have "improved care processes, reduced costs associated with care, and improved the quality and length of life of older adults."

== Early life and education ==
Rantz was born on May 22, 1950, and raised in East St. Louis, Illinois to an American-German family. She was very close with her great‐aunt Amelia Oliver and chose to pursue a career in the field of gerontology after she was placed in a nursing home. Rantz earned her Bachelor of Science degree in nursing from the University of Illinois and her Master's degree from the University of Wisconsin–Whitewater. From there, she remained in Wisconsin for her Master of Science in Nursing at Marquette University and PhD from the University of Wisconsin-Milwaukee.

== Career ==
While earning her degrees, Rantz accepted a position at a nursing home before moving to Missouri to follow her husband Wally. She joined the Sinclair School of Nursing faculty at the University of Missouri and continued her database work, which evolved into the Quality Improvement Program of Missouri. In 1999, she co-launched a two‐year study of 700 seniors and created care plans that coordinated their physicians’ efforts. Due to her academic accomplishments, Rantz chaired the Editorial Review Group specializing in long-term care and geriatrics from 1997 until 2014. She sat on the Long-Term Care and Geriatric Nursing editorial review group during her tenure. From 2005 until 2015, Rantz was appointed the Helen E. Nahm Chair at MU Sinclair School of Nursing.

In 2011, Rantz established the Aging in Place (AIP) model which "provides services and care to meet residents’ increasing needs to avoid relocation to higher levels of care." Prior to country-wide implementation, AIP was used at TigerPlace, an independent living community, and was found to save money. In recognition of her innovative, collaborative and strategic efforts in implementing Aging in Place, she was elected to the National Academy of Medicine in 2012. She also received a $15 million grant from the United States Department of Health and Human Services Centers for Medicare and Medicaid Services to implement a project aimed at reducing avoidable re-hospitalizations among nursing home residents.

Rantz continued to conduct research at TigerPlace, where she found that residents stayed longer than seniors who live in other senior housing across the nation. She contributed this to the institute's use of sensor technology and onsite care coordination to maintain residents’ health. A few years later, she implemented the Missouri Quality Initiative for Nursing Homes, a program aimed at improving nursing home care, at TigerPlace and saw significant reductions in spending and potentially avoidable hospitalizations in participating nursing homes. In another effort to increase care in nursing homes, Rantz suggested that such care homes should budget for hiring advance practice registered nurses to work full time. In recognition of her efforts, Rantz was recognized by the University of Wisconsin-Milwaukee Alumni Association with the Lifetime Achievement Award and by the March of Dimes as a "Legend" for her pioneering work in nursing home care quality. She was also the recipient of the 2016 Doris Schwartz Gerontological Nursing Research Award, given in recognition of outstanding and sustained contribution to gerontological nursing research.

In 2020, Rantz was named a "Living Legend" by the American Academy of Nursing for her research efforts which have "improved care processes, reduced costs associated with care, and improved the quality and length of life of older adults."

== Personal life ==
Rantz and her husband Wally have two children together.
