= Faye Glenn Abdellah =

American nurse (1919–2017)

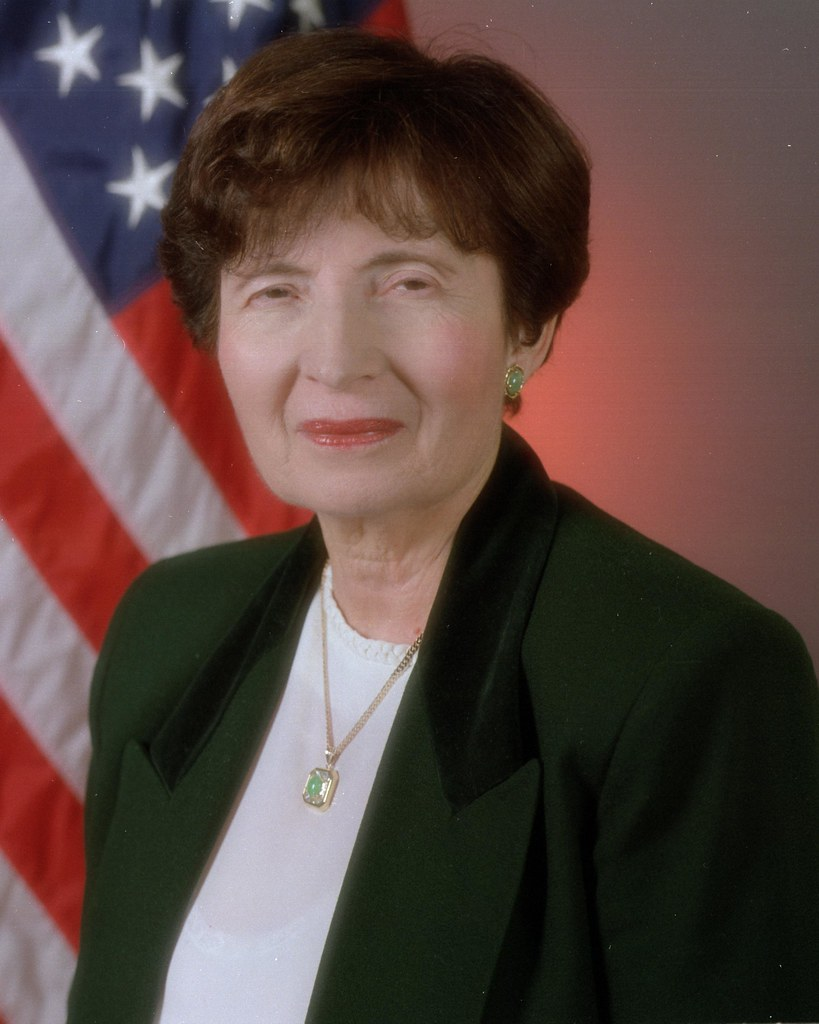
- Abdellah, 1988
- Born: March 13, 1919; New York City, U.S.
- Died: February 24, 2017 (aged 97)
- Education: Teachers' College at Columbia University; Douglass Residential College; Ann May School of Nursing
- Occupations: Professor of Nursing and Deputy Surgeon General
- Known for: First nurse and woman to serve as Deputy to the Surgeon General; led the formation of the National Institute of Nursing Research at the NIH; founder and first dean of the Graduate School of Nursing at USUHS
- Awards: 2012 Inductee, American Nurses Association Hall of Fame; 2000 Inductee, National Women's Hall of Fame; 1994 Living Legend, American Academy of Nursing

Faye Glenn Abdellah (March 13, 1919 – February 24, 2017) was an American pioneer in nursing research. Abdellah was the first nurse and woman to serve as the Deputy Surgeon General of the United States. Preceding her appointment, she served in active duty during the Korean War, where she earned a distinguished ranking equivalent to a Navy Rear Admiral, making her the highest-ranked woman and nurse in the Federal Nursing Services at the time. In addition to these achievements, Abdellah led the formation of the National Institute of Nursing Research at the NIH, and was the founder and first dean of the Graduate School of Nursing at the Uniformed Services University of the Health Sciences (USUHS). A few of Abdellah's more passionate interests in public health included the importance of long-term care planning for elderly patients; the need to strengthen nursing school infrastructure; and the necessity of patient-centered approaches in nursing. In 2000, Abdellah was inducted into the National Women's Hall of Fame. During her acceptance speech, Abdellah made the following quote: "We cannot wait for the world to change . . . Those of us with intelligence, purpose, and vision must take the lead and change the world . . . I promise never to rest until my work has been completed!”

Abdellah donated a collection of her papers to the National Library of Medicine in November 1988. Abdellah died on February 24, 2017, at the age of 97.

== Education ==
- PhD in education psychology, Masters of Arts, and Bachelors of Science degrees from the Teachers’ College at Columbia University in New York, NY
- Liberal arts and chemistry specializations at Douglass Residential College, a division of Rutgers University, in New Brunswick, NJ
- RN diploma from Fitkin Memorial Hospital (later named Ann May School of Nursing) in Neptune, NJ

== Career ==
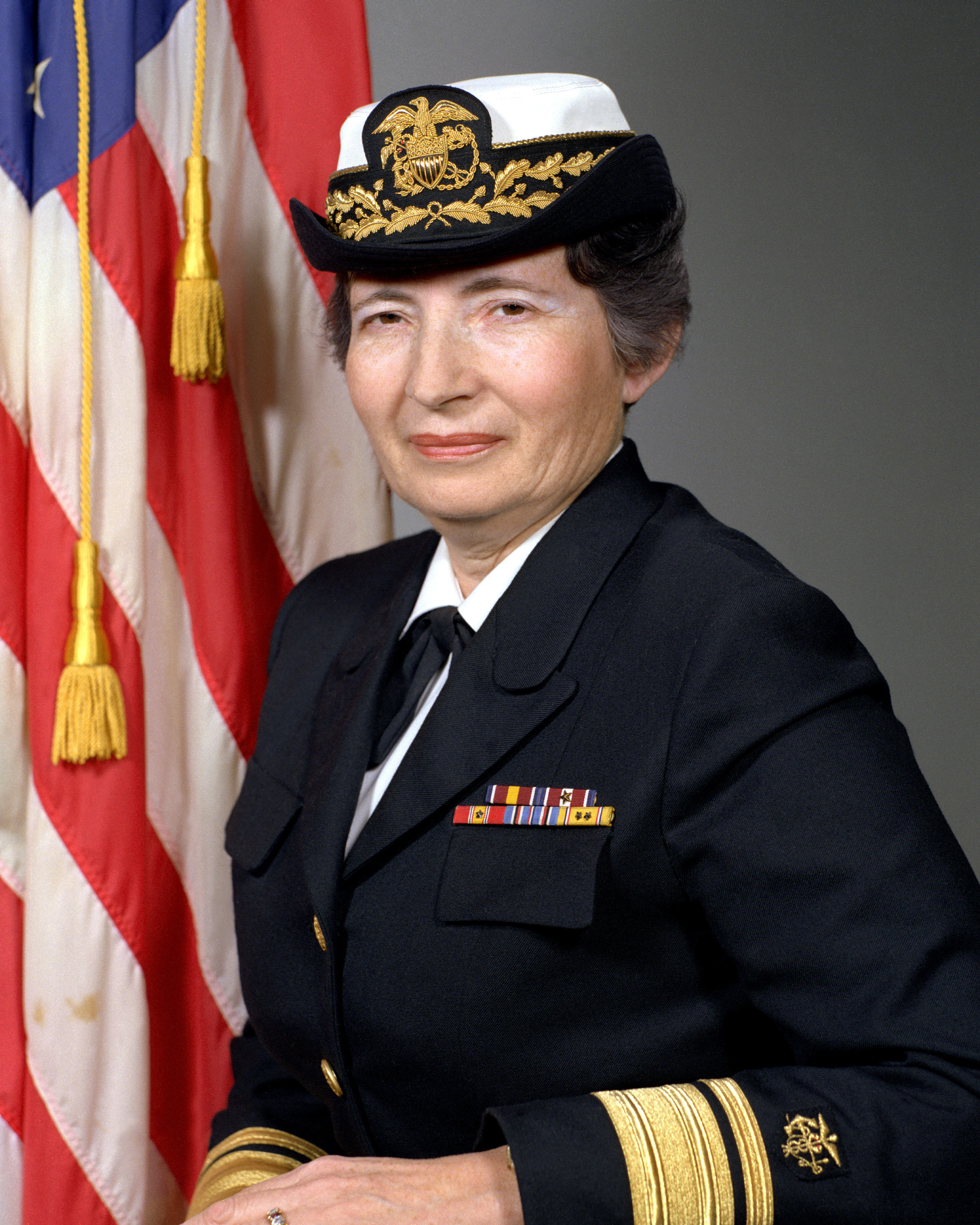
Rear Adm. Abdellah in 1982

Abdellah was a professor of nursing arts, pharmacology, and medical nursing at the Yale University School of Nursing from 1945 until 1949. From 1950 until 1954 she served in active duty during the Korean War, where she earned a distinguished ranking equivalent to a Navy Rear Admiral, making her the highest-ranked woman and nurse in the Federal Nursing Services at the time. Following the war, she served as a visiting professor at the University of Washington; the University of Colorado, Boulder; and the University of Minnesota. In 1981, she was appointed deputy to Surgeon General C. Everett Koop, making her the first nurse and woman to serve as Deputy Surgeon General of the United States. As Deputy Surgeon General, she frequently served as an alternate ex-officio member of the Board of Regents at the United States National Library of Medicine (NLM), and contributed to policies that shaped NLM programs, services, and NLM's Long-Range Plan for 1986-2006. She served as Deputy Surgeon General until her retirement in 1989. Following her retirement, Abdellah taught as a professor at the College of Nursing at the University of South Carolina; and established and served as the acting dean of the first federal graduate school of nursing at the Uniformed Services University of the Health Sciences (USUHS). She was named a Living Legend by the American Academy of Nursing in 1994.

== Perspectives on nursing education ==
Abdellah was passionate in the effort to improve nursing education. Early in her career, while working for Yale University, she became frustrated by the lack of scientific basis in the National League of Nursing guidelines, and proceeded to burn a stack of the curriculum guides in the Yale courtyard. She mentioned with some humor that it took well over a year for her to pay for the destroyed books.

Throughout her career, Abdellah advocated for the strengthening of nursing school infrastructure. Specifically, she called for cross-disciplinary collaborations in nursing education; the teaching of specialized and budgeting skills in nursing graduate education; increased admittance of nursing students from minority backgrounds; and fostering humanistic skills in future nurses, such as compassion for patients. She was also a proponent of the teaching the teacher method, where graduate students are taught specialized skills so that they may teach the skills to future students.

Abdellah created a typology of twenty-one areas of focus for the nurse. These problems were divided into three classes: physical, sociological and emotional needs of the patient; the types of nurse-patient interpersonal relationships; and common elements of patient care.

== Select awards and achievements ==
- 2012: Inductee, American Nurses Association Hall of Fame
- 2000: Inductee, National Women's Hall of Fame
- 1994: Living Legend, American Academy of Nursing
- 11 honorary degrees
- 152 publications
- Over 50 academic awards and recognitions

== See also ==
- List of Living Legends of the American Academy of Nursing
