= May Wykle =

American nurse

May Louise Wykle
- Born: February 11, 1934 (age 92); Martins Ferry, Ohio
- Occupations: Nurse, Gerontologist
- Spouse: William L. Wykle
- Parent(s): John R. and Florence A. Randall

May Louise Hinton-Wykle (FAAN, FGSA) (born February 11, 1934) is an American nurse, gerontologist, educator, researcher, and the first African-American Marvin E. and Ruth Durr Denekas Endowed Chair at the Frances Payne Bolton School of Nursing of Case Western Reserve University. Wykle also serves as a professor at Georgia Southwestern State University and teaches Geriatric Nursing, Mental Health Nursing, Nursing Administration, and Minority Student Recruitment and Retention.

== Early life and education ==
May Louise Hinton-Wykle was born February 11, 1934, in Martins Ferry, Ohio, to John R. and Florence A. Randall. Wykle graduated from Mount Pleasant High School in rural Ohio. Originally, she wished to attend medical school but decided to switch career paths after working as a nurse's aide for one year at Martins Ferry Hospital. Her grandmother also served as her inspiration when she decided to pursue a career in health care. Her grandparents lived with her when she was young and she often helped her mother care for them. As her grandmother was also very involved and often participated in charity work, she was able to witness first hand how to care for older adults in her community.

She earned her nursing diploma in 1956 at the Ruth Brant School of Nursing in Martins Ferry, Ohio. After graduating, Wykle went on to work as a staff nurse at the Cleveland Psychiatric Institute. There, she gained experience as a head nurse and later, a supervisor. In 1962, she pursued her bachelor's degree in nursing, then returned to the Cleveland Psychiatric Institute as an instructor and director of nursing education. In 1969, Wykle went back to Case Western Reserve University to earn her master's degree in psychiatric nursing and her PhD in nursing, where her teachers were so impressed with her, they asked her to join the faculty. She has been a faculty member there since.

== Personal life ==
May Wykle married William L. Wykle, who died January 2, 2019. She currently has two grandchildren, named Alexis and Larry.

== Career ==
Wykle is an expert in the field of aging. She has conducted research in the areas of mental health, physical health, and spirituality among older adults, self-care activities of caregivers and elders, including health promotion, care-giving across the life span, HIV-related care-giving, black-versus-white caregivers and minority elder health. She is a fellow in the American Academy of Nursing and the Gerontological Society of America, a former director of a Robert Wood Johnson Teaching Nursing Home Project, and a recipient of a Geriatric Mental Health Academic Award from the National Institute of Mental Health. Since joining Case Western Reserve University in 1969, she has held various teaching and research positions including a joint appointment as Director of Nursing at Hanna Pavilion of University Hospitals of Cleveland, Chairperson of Psychiatric Mental Health Nursing at the Frances Payne Bolton School of Nursing and Dean of nursing at the Francis Payne Bolton School of Nursing.

In 1993, Wykle was a delegate and served on the Planning Committee of the White House Conference on Aging.

Wykle was the first recipient of the "Pope Eminent Scholar" at the Rosalynn Carter Institute for Caregivers in 1999 and still serves on the board of directors.

In 1999, Wykle was elected President of The Honor Society of Nursing, Sigma Theta Tau International.

In 2005, Wykle became a Director of American Red Cross's Greater Cleveland Chapter.

In 2011, Sigma Theta Tau announced that Wykle would be inducted into the International Nurse Researcher Hall of Fame. In this same year, she served as the President of the Friends of the National Institute of Nursing Research.

In the summer of 2013, Wykle stepped in as an interim dean at the Cuyahoga Community College to help the school navigate its issues with accreditation.

=== Professional awards ===
- 1985 NIMH Geriatric Mental Health Academic Award
- 1992 The Outstanding Researcher in the State of Ohio from the Ohio Research Council on Aging
- 1993 Delegate and Member of the Planning Committee of the White House Conference on Aging
- 1999 Humanitarian Award for Outstanding Contributions to the Nursing Profession
- 1999 The Leadership Award for Excellence in Geriatric Care from the Midwest Alliance in Nursing
- 1999 President of The Honor Society of Nursing, Sigma Theta Tau International
- 1999 First recipient of the Pope Eminent Scholar at the Rosalynn Carter Institute for Caregiving
- 1999 The Belle Sherwin Award for Distinguished Nursing Professional of the Year from the Cleveland Visiting Nurse Association
- 2000 Doris Schwartz Nursing Research Award from the Gerontological Society of America
- 2009 Case Western Reserve University Distinguished Alumni Award
- 2010 American Nurses Association's Mary Mahoney Award

== Work on minority representation ==
During her career as nurse and educator, May Wykle made it her mission to open up the field of nursing to more minorities. From being denied admission to several nursing schools due to her race, she became the first African American to be accepted to the Ruth Bryant School of Nursing of Martins Ferry, Ohio. At the time she became a staff member of Martin's Ferry Hospital, Wykle was one of the very few African-American nurses to be working at an all-white hospital in the nation. When she attended school in Cleveland, Wykle recalled the difference it made to her when she saw African-American doctors and nurses for the first time. While living in the nurses' residence as a student, Wykle noted another nurse who took her under her wing, stating "[Seeing other African American nurses] gave me some confidence in knowing [that I] could succeed." In 1969, Wykle took on a teaching position at her alma mater, Case Western Reserve University, because she saw it as an opportunity to be an advocate for admitting more minority nursing students. Wykle put her vision into practice, going on to direct a geriatric psychiatry graduate nursing program during her early years as a faculty member of Frances Payne Bolton School of Nursing. This was significant because it opened up a large number of opportunities for nurses, specifically African-American students, to specialize in geriatric psychiatry.

Once she became a dean at the nursing school, Wykle was able to maintain a high enrollment of minority students, specifically African-American applicants. She also believed that the initial low percentages of minority applicants was due to lack of encouragement in African-American communities to pursue a career in nursing as well as the need for financial assistance. Therefore, she pushed for an increase in minority faculty to serve as role models and collaborated with high school counselors and teachers to recruit more students with diverse backgrounds. Due to her efforts, the Frances Payne Bolton School of Nursing also boasts a minority student retention record above the national average. In 2007, the school's Board of Trustees created the May L. Wykle Endowed Professorship, one of the first to be named for an African-American at Case Western, in response to her commitment, healthcare leadership, and many contributions to nursing.

== Selected publications ==
- Wykle, M. L., & Gueldner, S. H. (2010). Aging Well: Gerontological Education for Nurses. Sadbury, MA: Jones & Bartlett Learning
- Wykle, M. L., Gueldner, S. H. (2011). In M. Wykle and S. Gueldner (Ed.), "Conclusions and Closing Comments." In Aging Well: gerontological Education for Nurses and Other Health Professionals. (pp. 579–582). Sudbury, MA: Jones & Bartlett Publishers
- Musil, C. M., Gordon, N. H., Warner, C. B. Zauszniewski, J. A., Standing, T. S., Wykle, M. L. (2011). Grandmothers and caregiving to grandchildren: Continuity, change and outcomes over 24 months. the Gerontologist, 51(1), 86–100. doi:10.1093/geront/gnq061.
- Wykle, M. L., Whitehouse, P.J., Morris, D.L., (2004). Successful Aging Through the Life Span. New York, NY: Springer Publishing
- Wykle, M. L., & Ford, A. B. (1999). Serving Minority Elders in the 21st Century. New York, NY: Springer Publishing
- Wykle, M.L., Kahana, E., Biegel, D.E., (1994). Family Caregiving Across the Lifespan. Thousand Oaks, CA: Sage Publications

== See also ==
- American Academy of Nursing
- Gerontology
- Gerontological Society of America
- List of Living Legends of the American Academy of Nursing
