= Margaret Heitkemper =

American nurse

- Born: Longview, Washington, US
- Spouse: David Heitkemper (m. 1973)

Academic background
- Education: BSN, Seattle University; MSN, University of Washington; PhD, University of Illinois

Academic work
- Institutions: University of Washington

Margaret Eunice McLean Heitkemper is an American nurse. She is the Elizabeth Sterling Soule Endowed Chair in Nursing at the University of Washington.

== Early life and education ==
Heitkemper was born to nurse Jennie McLean, who was a servicewoman during World War II, and Gordon McLean in Longview, Washington. During high school, Heitkemper worked as a nurse’s aide and started her professional career at PeaceHealth St. John Medical Center. Heitkemper earned her Bachelor of Science in nursing from Seattle University, her Master's degree in gerontologic nursing from the University of Washington (UW), and her PhD in physiology and biophysics from the University of Illinois Chicago.

== Career ==
Following her PhD, Heitkemper returned to UW in 1981 and served with their physiological nursing faculty before becoming a full professor in 1990. In 1994, Heitkemper was one of the winners of the University of Washington Distinguished Teaching Award. By 2001, Heitkemper served as chair of the Department of Biobehavioral Nursing and Health System, Corbally Professor in public service and Director of the Center for Women’s Health Research in the School of Nursing. As a result, she was one of 20 nurses in the United States selected for a three-year Robert Wood Johnson Foundation Executive Nurse Fellowship program. During this time, she also received the Distinguished Nutrition Support Nurse Award from the American Society for Parenteral and Enteral Nutrition and the American Gastroenterological Association and Janssen Award for Clinical Research in Gastroenterology.

In the fall of 2006, Heitkemper was appointed the Elizabeth Sterling Soule Endowed Chair in Nursing and received the American Academy of Nursing Council for the Advancement of Nursing Science Outstanding Nurse Scientist Award. While serving in this role, Heitkemper was also appointed to the National Institute of Health’s National Commission on Digestive Diseases and received the 2010 Friends of the National Institute of Nursing Research Pathfinder award. She received the Pathfinder Award for being a nurse researcher whose research has made a difference in the lives of people with health care needs, and has been sustained by multiple research grants from the National Institute of Nursing Research." In 2013, Heitkemper and Monica Jarrett oversaw a research team to identify factors that trigger Irritable Bowel Syndrome (IBS) symptoms such as sleep quality, inflammation and stress, and developing treatment approaches. They began an NIH-funded clinical trial to treat IBS without the use of medications. Following this, she was named to Washington State Academy of Sciences. She was named a Living Legend by the American Academy of Nursing in 2026.

Following the IBS study, Heitkemper was elected to the National Academy of Medicine (then referred to as the Institute of Medicine) in 2015. She was later named the co-director of the UW's Center for Innovation in Sleep Self-Management. The aim of the center is to work towards developing interventions to help adults and children with chronic illnesses sleep better.

== Personal life ==
Heitkemper married David Heitkemper in 1973.
