= Marie Cowan =

American nurse & academic (1938-2008)

Marie Jeanette Johnson Cowan (July 20, 1938 – February 22, 2008) was an American nurse and academic who conducted cardiovascular research. A faculty member at Seattle University and the University of Washington, Cowan was hired as the nursing school dean at UCLA in 1997. She was a Living Legend of the American Academy of Nursing.

== Biography ==
Cowan was born in Albuquerque, New Mexico, in 1938. She went to Munich through an exchange program with the University of Maryland, where she met a student named Samuel Cowan. In 1961, on the day after Cowan completed a diploma in nursing at Mary's Help Hospital in San Francisco, she and Samuel were married. After completing a bachelor's degree in nursing and a master's degree in physiology and biophysics, Cowan earned a Ph.D. at the University of Washington in an interdisciplinary program combining pathology, biophysics and physiology.

Cowan started her academic career as a professor at Seattle University. Later, she conducted basic science and nursing science research as a professor at the University of Washington. There, she held joint appointments in the nursing school and in the medical school's departments of pathology and cardiology. She was continuously funded by the National Institutes of Health (NIH) after 1977.

In 1997, Cowan was hired as dean of the nursing school at UCLA. She instituted a basic sciences emphasis in the nursing Ph.D. program, and in 2006 she reestablished the school's undergraduate nursing program, which had been lost prior to her arrival at the university due to lack of funding. Cowan served on the first NIH peer review group established for nurses.

In 2007, Cowan was designated a Living Legend of the American Academy of Nursing. She died in 2008 after suffering from colon cancer for ten years. She had been married to Samuel Cowan since 1961. The American Heart Association's Council on Cardiovascular and Stroke Nursing presents the Marie Cowan Promising Young Investigator Award to honor early-career researchers in the field.
