= Ramona T. Mercer =

American nursing theorist (1929–2023)

Ramona Thieme Mercer (October 4, 1929 – August 10, 2023) was an American author of a mid-range nursing theory known as maternal role attainment. She contributed many works to the refinement of this theory and is credited as a nurse-theorist. Mercer was the Nahm Lecturer 1984 at the UCSF School of Nursing.

== Life and career ==
Mercer earned a diploma from St. Margaret's School of Nursing in Montgomery, Alabama. She earned an undergraduate degree in nursing with distinction from the University of New Mexico in 1962, followed by a master's degree in maternal child nursing from Emory University in 1964. For ten years, she worked as a staff nurse, head nurse and instructor. Mercer was a faculty member at Emory University for five years until she left to pursue doctoral studies in maternity nursing at the University of Pittsburgh.

Mercer died on August 10, 2023, at the age of 93.

== Honors and awards ==
1988: Distinguished Research Lectureship Award, Western Society for Research in Nursing (inaugural award)
2003: Living Legend, American Academy of Nursing
2004: Distinguished Alumni Award, University of New Mexico College of Nursing

== Works ==
- Mercer, Ramona (1980). "Teenage motherhood: The first year". Journal of Obstetric, Gynecologic, and Neonatal Nursing. 9 (1): 16–27. doi:10.1111/j.1552-6909.1980.tb01301.x. PMID 6898708.
- Mercer, Ramona (1981). "A theoretical framework for studying factors that impact on the maternal role". Nursing Research. 30 (2): 73–77. doi:10.1097/00006199-198103000-00003. PMID 7010317.
- Mercer, Ramona (1985). "The process of maternal role attainment over the first year". Nursing Research. 34 (4): 198–204. doi:10.1097/00006199-198507000-00002. PMID 3847870.
- Mercer, Ramona (1986). First-time motherhood: Experiences from teens to forties. New York: Springer.
- Mercer, Ramona; May, KA; Ferketich, S; Dejoseph, J (1986). "Theoretical models for studying the effect of antepartum stress on the family". Nursing Research. 35 (6): 339–346. doi:10.1097/00006199-198611000-00008. PMID 3640350. S2CID 30891020.
- Mercer, Ramona (1995). Becoming a mother: Research on maternal identity from Rubin to the present. New York: Springer.
- Mercer, Ramona; Ferketich, S. (1990). "Predictors of parental attachment during early parenthood". Journal of Advanced Nursing. 15 (3): 268–280. doi:10.1111/j.1365-2648.1990.tb01813.x. PMID 2332549.
- Mercer, Ramona; Ferketich, S. (1994). "Predictors of maternal role competence by risk status". Nursing Research. 43 (1): 38–43. doi:10.1097/00006199-199401000-00009. PMID 8295838. S2CID 45798028.

== See also ==
- List of Living Legends of the American Academy of Nursing
