= Rozella M. Schlotfeldt =

American academic administrator (1914–2005)

Rozella Schlotfeldt
- Born: Rozella May Schlotfeldt; June 29, 1914; DeWitt, Iowa
- Died: July 23, 2005 (aged 91); Cleveland, Ohio

Rozella May Schlotfeldt (June 29, 1914 – July 23, 2005) was an American nurse, educator, and researcher. Originally from DeWitt, Iowa, Schlotfeldt received her BS in nursing from the University of Iowa in 1935. She continued her studies at the University of Chicago in 1947 before becoming the dean of the Frances Payne Bolton School of Nursing at Case Western Reserve University in 1960.

== Early life ==
Rozella M. Schlotfeldt was born in 1914 in DeWitt, Iowa. Her father, John, was a businessman, and her mother, Clara, was a nurse. Her father died in 1918 when she was just four years old, so her mother went back to work to support Rozella and her four older sisters.

== Education ==
Schlotfeldt graduated from her high school as the valedictorian in 1931. She went on to study nursing at the University of Iowa where she graduated magna cum laude with a BS in Nursing in 1935. During an employment period with University of Iowa Hospitals, Schlotfeldt completed a postgraduate program at Cornell University in conjunction with New York Hospital. In 1947, she received her MS in Nursing Education and Administration from the University of Chicago. By 1956, Schlotfeldt finished her Ph.D. in Nursing Education at the University of Chicago.

Throughout her schooling, Schlotfeldt was a member of Sigma Theta Tau, an honors nursing fraternity. Schlotfeldt also holds an honorary doctorate from Georgetown University.

== Career ==
Immediately following her graduation from the University of Iowa, Schlotfeldt was hired by University of Iowa Hospitals as a maternity staff nurse. In 1936, she took the position as staff and head nurse of the Veterans' Hospital in Des Moines, Iowa. Following that position, Schlotfeldt, became an instructor and supervisor of maternity nursing at the University of Iowa Hospitals.

Leaving the hospital setting, Schlotfeldt went and worked in the Army Nurse Corps during World War II where she served in England, France, and Austria. Following the war, she became an assistant professor at the University of Colorado College of Nursing.

However, she did not get much teaching time, so she moved on to Wayne State University. There, she was an assistant professor until 1955, where she left to work on her Ph.D. After she finished her Ph.D, Schlotfeldt returned to Wayne State University as an associate dean of research.

A few years later, in 1960, Schlotfeldt moved on to become the dean of the Frances Payne Bolton School of Nursing at Case Western Reserve University. While serving as dean, Schlotfeldt created the collaboration model of nursing where she combined clinical learning with lectures to ensure the best education of incoming nurses. This collaboration model is still in use today between the Frances Payne Bolton School and University Hospitals of Cleveland. She remained there until she retired as dean in 1972, but continued her career as a professor for nursing students until 1982.

Shortly after she was appointed to dean of the Frances Payne Bolton School, Schlotfeldt joined the task force to pass the 1964 Nurse Training Act. While at Case Western Reserve University, Schlotfeldt also served as a special consultant to the Surgeon General's Advisory Group on Nursing from 1961 to 1963. From 1967 to 1974, Schlotfeldt served on the board for the Walter Reed Army Institute for Nursing Research. Shortly before her retirement, she was the president of the Ohio Board of Nursing Education and Nurse Registration.

In 1971, Schlotfeldt was elected to the Institute of Medicine for the National Academy of Sciences.

Throughout the years, Schlotfeldt was a visiting professor at various universities including, Indiana University, University of Texas-Austin, University of Alabama-Birmingham, University of San Diego, Rutgers University, and University of Pennsylvania.

Furthermore, Schlotfeldt served as president on the American Nurses Association Study Committee as well as the American Academy of Nursing. Schlotfeldt also co-founded the Midwest Nursing Research Society (known today as the Midwest Alliance in Nursing) and was a member on the Council of Nurses. Schlotfeldt also served as the first nurse on the Council and Executive Committee of the Institute of Medicine.

== Table of committee positions ==
Committee	Position
Surgeon General's Advisory Committee	Special Consultant
Sigma Theta Tau Committee on Research	Chairman
Steering Committee N.L.N. Department of Baccalaureate and Higher Degree Programs	Vice Chairman
Cleveland Health Council - Council Planning Board	Member
Cleveland Health Council - Periodic Review Committee	Chairman
Cleveland Health Council - Committee on Health Goals	Member
U.S. Veterans' Hospital	Consultant
Cleveland Citizens' Committee on Nursing Education Resources	Member
U.S.P.H.S. Nursing Research Study Section	Constultant
U.S.P.H.S. - N.L.N. Committee on Nursing Education Facilities	Member
American Nurses Association - Committee on Long Term Goals	Vice Chairman
Cuyahoga Community College - Nursing Advisory Committee	Member
President Johnson's Health Manpower Commission - Panel on Health Manpower	Member
National Center for Health Services and Mental Health Administration - Advisory Council	Member
Secretary of Health - Education and Welfare's Commission to Study Nursing Roles	Member
National Institute of Mental Health - Policy and Planning Board and Subcommittee on Nursing	Member
Defense Advisory Committee for Women in the Services	Member
American Nurse's Association - Commission on Nursing Education	Member
American Nurse's Association - Committee on Credentialing in Nursing	Member
U.S.P.H.S. - Research Training Committee	Member
Health Services and Mental Health Administration - Research Scientist Development Awards Committee	Member
Health Services Research - Advisory Panel	Member
National Committee for Biomedical and Behavioral Research Scientists	Member
Commission on Human Resources of the National Research Council	Member
Walter Reed Army Institute for Nursing Research	Consultant
Army Nurse Corps	First Lieutenant, Recruiter
U.S. Department of Health, Education, and Welfare - Office of Nursing Home Affairs	Consultant
Ohio Board of Nursing Education and Nurse Registration	President, Vice President, Member
National Study Commission on Pharmacy	Member
Northeast Ohio Regional Medical Program - Regional Advisory Group	Member
Ohio Department of Health - Health Manpower Strategy Advisory Group	Member
American Institute for Research Advisory Committee	Member
W. K. Kellogg Foundation Advisory Council	Member
American Institute for Behavioral Research	Consultant

Positions found in CWRU Archives

== Awards, honors and memberships ==
Award	Honoring Group/Institute	Year
Centennial Award	Wayne State University	1968
Honorary Recognition Award	American Nurse's Association	1970
Distinguished Service Award	University of Iowa	1973
Distinguished Service Award	University of San Diego	1979
Honorary Doctorate of Science	Georgetown University	1972
Honorary Degree	The Medical University of South Carolina	1976
Merit Award for Distinguished Service in Nursing	Boston University	1975
R. Louise McManus Medal	Nursing Alumni Association of Teachers College, Columbia University	1979
Living Legend	American Academy of Nursing	1995
Founders' Award	Sigma Tau Theta	1985
The Edith Moore Copeland Award for Creativity	Sigma Tau Theta	1985

Awards found in the CWRU Archives

== Publications ==
Schlotfeldt has published over 100 works regarding her research. Her first being her dissertation titled, "The Educational Leadership Role of Nursing School Executives and Faculty Satisfaction." in 1956.

All of her publications can be found in the archives at the University of Pennsylvania.
