= Rosemary Donley =

American academic administrator

Sister Rosemary Donley
- Born: Pittsburgh, Pennsylvania
- Awards: American Academy of Nursing Living Legend (2006); Distinguished Daughter of Pennsylvania (2019)

Academic background
- Education: St. Louis University; University of Pittsburgh

Academic work
- Discipline: Nursing
- Institutions: Catholic University of America; Duquesne University

Sister Rosemary Donley is a nursing professor and a member of the Sisters of Charity of Seton Hill. She is known for her contributions to nursing education and health policy, as well as her support for social justice. She previously served as president of the National League for Nursing and Sigma Theta Tau International Honor Society of Nursing. She also served as senior editor for the Journal of Nursing Scholarship. She was elected to the National Academy of Medicine in 1989 and recognized as a Living Legend by the American Academy of Nursing in 2006.

== Early life and education ==
Donley was born and raised in Pittsburgh, Pennsylvania. She joined the Sisters of Charity from St. Philomena's Church, and became a registered nurse through a diploma program at Pittsburgh Hospital. She received her BSN from St. Louis University summa cum laude, and her MSN and PhD in nursing education from the University of Pittsburgh.

== Career ==
She began her academic career as an associate professor of general nursing at her alma mater, the University of Pittsburgh. In 1977, she was awarded the Robert Wood Johnson Health Policy Fellowship. She was the third woman to receive the fellowship, and worked primarily in the office of Congressman Doug Wahlgren.

By 1980, she had been elected president of Sigma Theta Tau and was dean of the school of nursing at the Catholic University of America. She held this position until 1986, when she was promoted to become executive vice president of the university. In this position she advocated for consideration of spiritual wellbeing of patients, as well as physical.

She has held the Jacques Laval Chair for Justice for Vulnerable Populations at Duquesne University since 2009.

Throughout her career she has served as a keynote speaker for a number of different nursing conventions. She has also led workshops about community health and disaster preparedness. She has also been president of the National League for Nursing and senior editor of the Journal of Nursing Scholarship.

== Political activism ==
In 1979, she spoke out about President Jimmy Carter's veto of the Nurse Training Act. A few years later, she criticized the Reagan administration's cuts to health and human services. She expressed that there was "little evidence to suggest that when the rich become richer they give to the poor." She has also advocated for increased respect for the nursing profession as a whole.

== Awards and honors ==
- 1989 — elected to the National Academy of Medicine.
- 2006 — recognized as a Living Legend by the American Academy of Nursing.
- 2009 — received the St. Elizabeth Ann Seton Medal from Seton Hill University.
- 2019 — recognized as a Distinguished Daughter of Pennsylvania by Governor Tom Wolf.
