= Shirley Smoyak =

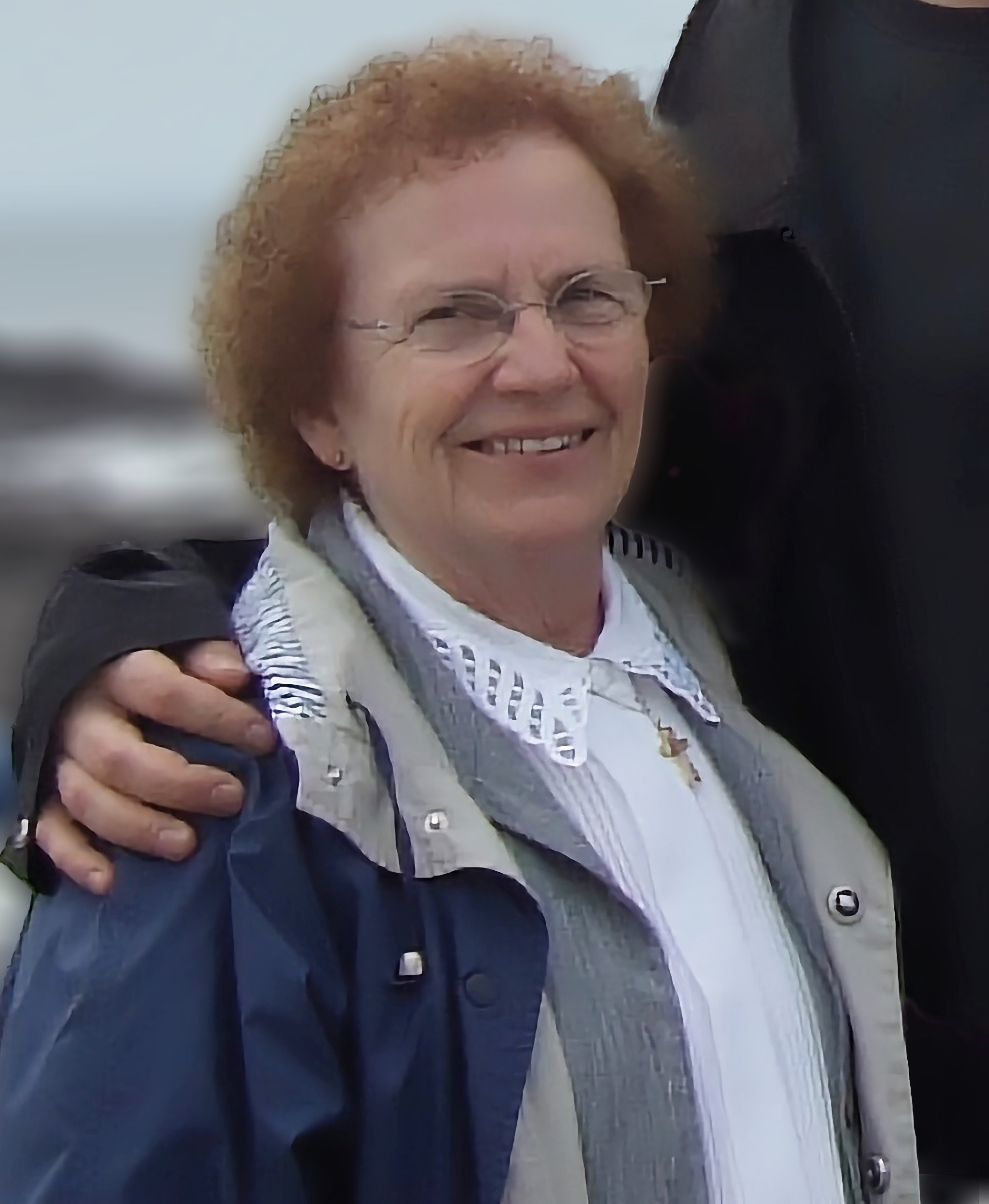
- Education: Rutgers University (Ph.D.)
- Known for: Editor-in-chief, Journal of Psychosocial Nursing and Mental Health Services
- Awards: Living Legend, American Academy of Nursing
- Scientific career
- Fields: Nursing
- Institutions: Rutgers University

Shirley A. Smoyak is a nurse and academic who has had a significant impact on the field of psychiatric nursing.

== Biography ==
After earning bachelor's and master's degrees in nursing and a doctorate in sociology, Smoyak became a faculty member at Rutgers University. She has taught courses both in nursing and in the social sciences. She has been the editor-in-chief of the Journal of Psychosocial Nursing and Mental Health Services since 1981. Smoyak was appointed to oversee reform efforts at Greystone Park Psychiatric Hospital in New Jersey. Some of her most recent research examines the effects of energy drinks on college students.

Smoyak received the 2011 Award for Distinguished Service from the American Psychiatric Nurses Association. She was designated a Living Legend of the American Academy of Nursing in 2004. In 2011 she was awarded Honorary Fellowship of the Royal College of Nursing.

== See also ==
- List of Living Legends of the American Academy of Nursing
