= Ernest Grant =

Ernest Grant may refer to:

- Ernest Grant (American football)
- Ernest Grant (nurse)
