= Shirley Chater =

American nurse and government official

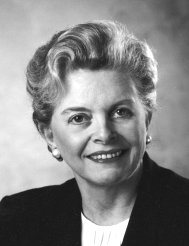
- Official portrait

12th Commissioner of the Social Security Administration
- In office October 8, 1993 – February 28, 1997
- President: Bill Clinton
- Preceded by: Lawrence Thompson (acting)
- Succeeded by: John Callahan (acting)

Personal details
- Born: Shirley Jean Sears; July 30, 1932 (age 93) Shamokin, Pennsylvania, U.S.
- Party: Democratic
- Education: University of Pennsylvania (BSN); University of California, San Francisco (MSN); University of California, Berkeley (PhD)

Shirley Sears Chater (born July 30, 1932) is an American nurse, educational administrator and government official who served as the 12th commissioner of the Social Security Administration from 1993 until 1997. In the 1970s and 1980s, Chater held faculty appointments in nursing and education at the University of California, San Francisco (UCSF) and the University of California, Berkeley, respectively. She worked as an administrator at UCSF and then worked for two national education councils.

Chater was president of Texas Woman's University from 1986 to 1993. She left TWU to serve as Commissioner of Social Security from 1993 to 1997. She helped the Robert Wood Johnson Foundation develop the Executive Nurse Fellows program. Chater was named a Living Legend of the American Academy of Nursing in 2000.

== Early life ==
Born on July 30, 1932, in Shamokin, Pennsylvania, Chater received an undergraduate degree in nursing from the University of Pennsylvania. After finishing her nursing degree, she applied to an international exchange program sponsored by the American Nurses Association. The program sent Chater to London, where she worked at St Bartholomew's Hospital for a year. Chater noted how much the St Bartholomew's nurses controlled their units; they locked the unit doors until they were ready for physicians to begin rounds.

Upon returning to Pennsylvania, Chater worked as a nursing faculty member. She wanted to begin graduate school at Penn, but a faculty mentor encouraged her to attend an out-of-state program to gain different perspectives. Chater completed an M.S. in nursing from UCSF. While she was a student at UCSF, Chater married neurosurgery resident Norman Chater and became pregnant with the first of two children a year later. She was asked to leave graduate school when she got pregnant, but she was able convince the school to let her remain in the program. She earned a Ph.D. in education from the University of California, Berkeley in 1964.

== Career ==
=== Early academic career ===
When her children were young, Chater worked part-time in education and in private duty nursing. In the 1970s and 1980s, Chater held faculty appointments in nursing at the University of California, San Francisco (UCSF) and in the education department at the University of California, Berkeley, respectively. She was Vice Chancellor for Academic Affairs at UCSF from 1977 to 1982, which made her the highest ranking woman in the UC system. She was nominated for chancellor at UCSF, but Chater realized that no non-physician had ever held the position and she withdrew from consideration. In the mid-1980s, she worked for the American Council on Education (ACE), which involved traveling between California and Washington, D.C.

=== Presidency at TWU ===
While on sabbatical from UCSF and working with ACE in Washington, D.C., in 1986, Texas Woman's University (TWU) nominated Chater as a candidate for university president. About half of TWU's academic offerings were in the health sciences, which made Chater a unique fit. She accepted the position in July 1986 and began there three months later. A state commission had just been formed to investigate whether some of the state's 37 public colleges could be merged. Between the time that Chater accepted the position and the time that she started, the commission proposed that TWU should be merged with the University of North Texas (UNT). In testimony before the commission, Chater pointed out that TWU was the nation's only public university primarily for women.

The commission in Texas cancelled the proposed merger of TWU and UNT about two months after Chater's arrival at TWU. Officials at TWU and the City of Denton credited her with focusing the university on a consistent mission. Upon her arrival, TWU had 33 academic programs with two or fewer graduates in the previous six years total. Chater led an effort that reorganized the university from a system of 11 schools into eight schools. In 1991, Chater was one of three finalists for the position of chancellor of California State University; Barry Munitz, a former chancellor of the University of Houston, was selected for the position.

=== Social Security Administration ===
Chater was sworn in as Commissioner of Social Security in October 1993. Shortly after taking office, she said that while there were no immediate plans to raise the retirement age, the issue would have to be examined. She cited the increasing life expectancy of people in the decades following the creation of Social Security. In 1994, the Social Security Administration was broken off from the Department of Health and Human Services, with Chater reporting directly to the president. The same legislation gave her office a six-year term. In January 1995, Clinton nominated Chater to a six-year term.

At her confirmation hearing the next month, she faced stern criticism from Senate Finance Committee chairman Bob Packwood. He accused her of not providing specific solutions to prevent Social Security from heading toward bankruptcy. The Senate Finance Committee did not act on Chater's nomination for the six-year term, meaning that she would only be able to serve through Clinton's term as president. An article in The Baltimore Sun said that the failed nomination hurt morale at the agency and may have undermined Chater's power with Congress. Chater announced her resignation from the Social Security Administration in the fall of 1996, effective January 31, 1997. In her resignation letter, Chater mentioned that she wanted to spend more time with her family.

=== Later career ===
After her service with Social Security, Chater joined the Robert Wood Johnson Foundation. She helped to develop the Executive Nurse Fellows program and served as its national advisory committee chair. The program is a three-year mentoring and education program for future nurse leaders. She was named a Living Legend of the American Academy of Nursing in 2000.

In 2011, Chater joined the board of directors of the Galen College of Nursing.

Chater is also a Fellow of the National Academy of Public Administration.

== Notes ==
Political offices
Preceded by Lawrence Thompson; Acting	Commissioner of the Social Security Administration; 1993–1997	Succeeded by John Callahan; Acting
