= Vernice Ferguson =

American nurse researcher and executive

Vernice D. Ferguson
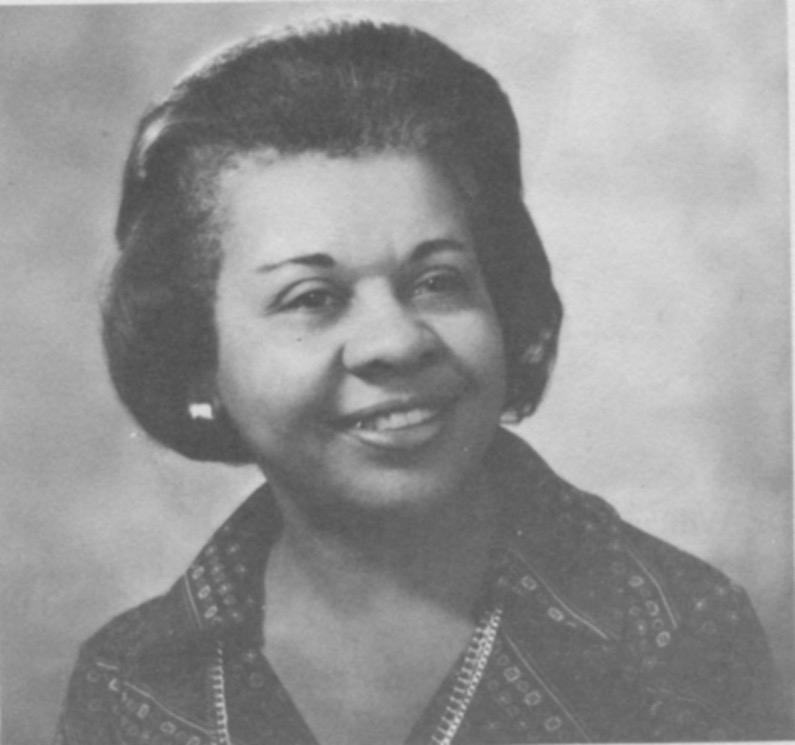
- Vernice Ferguson, 1980
- Born: June 13, 1928; Fayetteville, North Carolina
- Died: December 8, 2012 (aged 84); Washington, D.C.
- Occupations: Nurse, executive with United States Department of Veterans Affairs

Vernice Doris Ferguson (June 13, 1928 - December 8, 2012) was an American nurse and healthcare executive. She was the nursing department head at the National Institutes of Health Clinical Center for several years, then served as a nurse executive with the United States Department of Veterans Affairs for twelve years. Ferguson held faculty appointments at several American universities. She was named a Living Legend of the American Academy of Nursing, was the second American named an honorary Fellow of the Royal College of Nursing in the United Kingdom and received several honorary doctorates.

== Biography ==
=== Early life and career ===
Vernice Ferguson was born in Fayetteville, North Carolina, on June 13, 1928. She grew up in Baltimore, Maryland, where her father was a minister and her mother was a teacher. Ferguson volunteered at a hospital in high school. She taught junior high school science in Baltimore before she became a nurse. She received an undergraduate degree in nursing from New York University and a master's degree from Columbia University Teachers College. She began her career as a nurse at Montefiore Hospital on its NIH-funded Metabolic Neoplastic Research Unit.

From 1967 to 1970, Ferguson led the nursing service at the VA hospital in Madison, Wisconsin. Between 1972 and 1980, Ferguson headed the nursing department at the National Institutes of Health Clinical Center. In 1980, she became the chief nursing officer for the Veterans Administration, which employed around 60,000 nurses across the nation at that time. She retired in 1992. Ferguson helped to establish the Health Professions Scholarship Program during her tenure with the VA. Ferguson held teaching appointments at the University of Wisconsin at Madison, the University of Illinois, Georgetown University, the University of Maryland, and the University of Pennsylvania.

She served as president of the American Academy of Nursing from 1981 to 1983 and as president of Sigma Theta Tau from 1985 to 1987.

=== Awards and honors ===
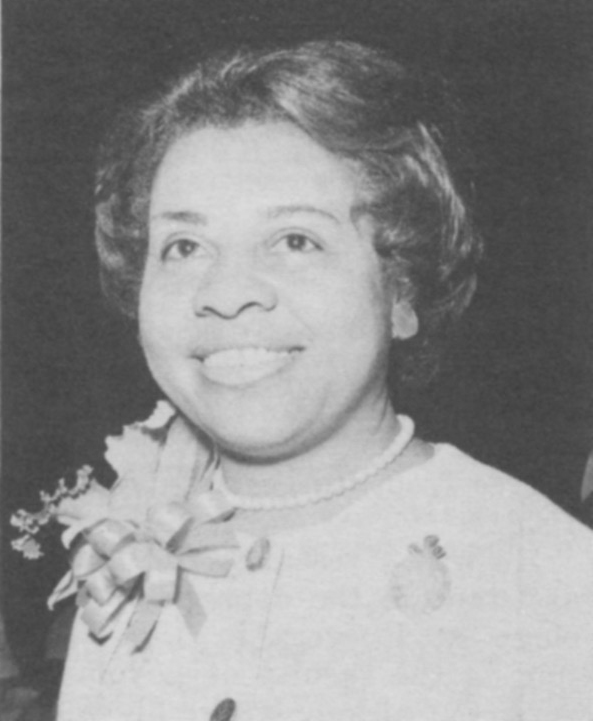
Vernice Ferguson, awarded the honorary degree of Doctor of Science from Marymount College, Virginia, 1977.

In 1970, Ferguson won the Mary Mahoney Award from the American Nurses Association, an award that recognizes contributions to racial equality in the nursing profession. She was designated a Living Legend of the American Academy of Nursing in 1998. Ferguson received a New York University College of Nursing Distinguished Alumni Award in 2010. She was the first nurse to receive the FREDDIE Lifetime Achievement Award, which recognizes excellence in medical media production. Ferguson was the second American named an honorary Fellow of the Royal College of Nursing in the United Kingdom.

=== Later life and legacy ===
In 1992, Ferguson retired from the VA and was named a senior fellow with the nursing program at the University of Pennsylvania. She was 84 years old when she died on December 8, 2012, in Washington, D.C. A memorial scholarship is awarded in her honor by the Nurses Organization of Veterans Affairs.

== See also ==
- List of Living Legends of the American Academy of Nursing
