= Eileen Sullivan-Marx =

American academic and nurse

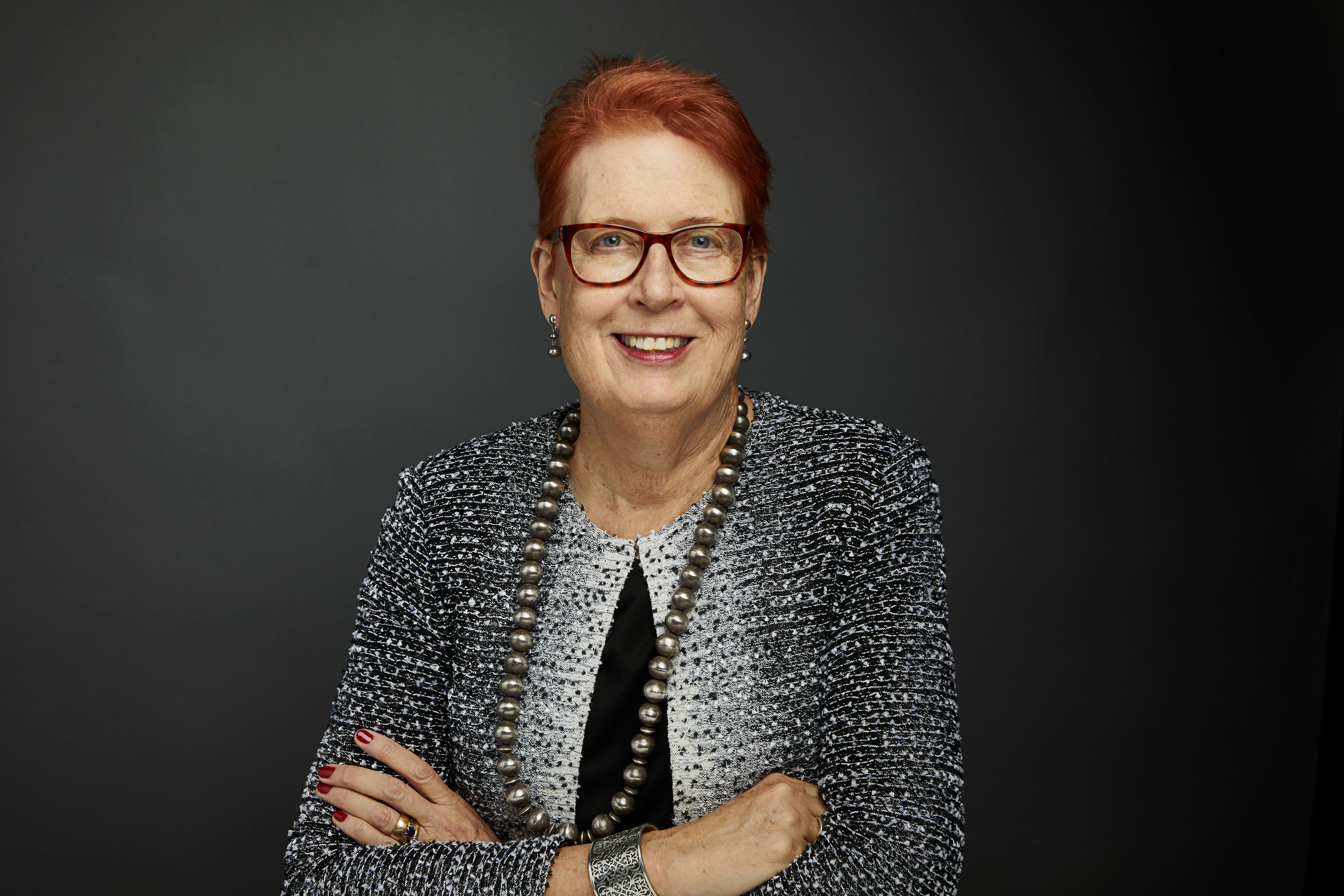
- Education: University of Pennsylvania (BSN); University of Rochester School of Nursing (MS); University of Pennsylvania School of Nursing (PhD)
- Occupation: Nurse
- Employer: New York University Rory Meyers College of Nursing
- Organization: American Academy of Nursing

Eileen Sullivan-Marx is a Professor Emerita and Dean Emerita of the New York University Rory Meyers College of Nursing, and was president of the American Academy of Nursing 2019-2021 (President-elect from 2017 until 2019).

== Education ==
Sullivan-Marx earned a BSN in 1976 from the University of Pennsylvania, and an MS (1980) from the University of Rochester School of Nursing as a family health nurse practitioner and a PhD from the University of Pennsylvania School of Nursing in 1995.

== Career ==
Sullivan-Marx was the associate dean for practice & community affairs at the University of Pennsylvania School of Nursing. For eleven years, she was the American Nurses Association representative (the first nurse to do so) to the American Medical Association’s Resource Based Relative Value Update Committee. She was named a Living Legend by the American Academy of Nursing in 2026.

== Awards ==
- International Sigma Theta Tau Honor Society Best of Image Research Award (1993)
- Hippensteel Founders Award for Excellence in Practice Award (2011)
- Doris Schwartz Gerontological Nursing Research Award (2013)
- VillageCare Award Distinguished Service Award in 2016.

President’s Award, American Academy of Nursing, 2023. Outstanding Alumni University of Pennsylvania School of Nursing Distinguished Alumni, University of Rochester School of Nursing Fellow, Academy of Diversity Leaders in Nursing Fellow, American Academy of Nursing Fellow, New York Academy of Medicine

== Publications ==
- Innovative collaborations: a case study for academic owned nursing practice
- Directions for the Development of Nursing Knowledge
