= Nola Pender =

American nursing theorist

- Born: August 16, 1941 (age 84)
- Education: Northwestern University (Ph.D.)
- Known for: Health Promotion Model
- Scientific career
- Fields: Nursing
- Institutions: Northern Illinois University; University of Michigan

Nola J. Pender (born August 16, 1941) is a nursing theorist, author, and academic. She is a professor emerita of nursing at the University of Michigan. She created the Health Promotion Model. She has been designated a Living Legend of the American Academy of Nursing.

== Biography ==
Nola J. Pender, PhD, RN, FAAN earned her BS in 1964 and her MA in 1965 from Michigan State University in East Lansing, MI. She received a PhD. from Northwestern University of Evanston, IL in 1969. She was a nurse educator for over 40 years.

During her doctoral studies, Pender became interested in health promotion. She said that she was influenced by a doctoral advisor named James Hall, who studied how people's thoughts shape their motivations and behaviors. In 1982, Pender published her Health Promotion Model. She has also written a textbook, Health Promotion in Nursing Practice; several editions of the book have been published. Her publications include eight textbooks and 50 scholarly writings.

She married Albert Pender, a business and economics professor. They had two children.

Pender was named a Living Legend of the American Academy of Nursing in 2012. The award has only been given to a few dozen nurses who have made exceptional contributions to the profession. Pender was president of the academy from 1991 to 1993.

== Health promotion model theory ==
Pender's health promotion model theory was first published in 1982 and later revised in 1996 and 2002. It is used for nursing research, education, and practice. Research has been conducted on the model since its inception. 250 articles have been published in the English language that use or apply Pender's HPM. Directed at improving an overall sense of well-being, Pender's model considers the holistic needs of each individual and their relationship with the environment to predict and explain health promoting behaviors. The purpose of the model is to assist nurses in understanding factors that affect health-promoting behaviors. The model provides eight components for the nurse to evaluate.

The health promotion model is based on eight key components of nursing:

1. person
2. environment
3. health
4. illnesses
5. individual characteristics and experiences
6. behavior-specific cognitions and affect
7. behavioral outcome.

Pender's health promotion model manual (2011) outlines the theory's major components as follows:

1. Individual characteristics and experiences- prior related behavior and personal factors (biological, psychological, sociocultural).
2. Behavior-specific cognition and affect- perceived benefits of action, perceived barriers to action, perceived self-efficacy, activity-related affect, interpersonal influences (family, peers, providers), situational influences (options, demand characteristics, aesthetics), commitment to a plan of action, and immediate competing demands and preferences.
3. Behavioral outcomes- health promoting behaviors including the desired behavioral end point or outcome of health decision-making and preparation for action.

== See also ==
- List of Living Legends of the American Academy of Nursing
