= Virginia Ohlson =

International Public Health Nurse

Virginia M. Ohlson
- Born: 1914; Chicago, Illinois, United States
- Died: April 10, 2010 (aged 95–96)
- Education: University of Chicago (Ph.D., M.S., B.S.); Endeavor Swedish Hospital (Nursing degree)
- Scientific career
- Fields: Public Health Nursing

Virginia Ohlson (1914 – April 10, 2010) was an American public health nurse and educator who taught in the University of Illinois, Chicago (UIC) nursing school for nearly 30 years. She played a major role in getting a master's degree in public health nursing established at UIC. Ohlson started the Office of Global Health Leadership (originally the Office for International Studies) to support students.

== Early life ==
Ohlson was born at Swedish Covenant hospital and grew up in a Swedish community within the city of Chicago on the North side with her two sisters.

She skipped two grades in elementary school and attended high school at Chicago's North Park Academy which was church-affiliated. She also attended North Park College (Junior College program), and remained interested in both Nursing and missionary work. Her aunt served on the faculty of the Illinois Training School. She also was impacted by the community neighbor Ruth Nordlund who shared her public health nursing experiences.

== Education ==
Ohlson received her nursing degree from Endeavor Swedish Hospital, formerly known as Swedish Covenant Hospital. While there she was one of two students selected to attend the American Nurses Association Biennial Convention. She had the second highest score in the state of Illinois when she took her state board exams.

She earned her Bachelor of Science in Nursing from University of Illinois Chicago (UIC) in 1946. On returning to the U.S. Ohlson earned her master's degree (in 1955) and then joined the faculty there. She earned her doctorate degree (in 1969) in nursing.

== Career ==
Ohlson began her nursing career during her educational years, becoming certified as a public health nurse in 1942. Her early work including serving as a school nurse managing immunization clinics. While studying at the University of Chicago, she worked in public health nursing.

In 1947, Ohlson relocated to postwar Japan, working within the U.S. Army as a civilian nurse. She worked in the Public Health and Welfare Section of General Douglas MacArthur's headquarters. She and her unit of nurses from the U.S. and elsewhere worked with their counterparts in Japan to reestablish nursing education and practice in Japan.

Ohlson was appointed chief nurse of the section in 1949. She subsequently was director of nursing for the Atomic Bomb Casualty Commission in Hiroshima, assisting scientific studies on the effects of radiation on the citizens of Hiroshima and Nagasaki. In that role she helped establish a system for licensing nurses.

In 1963, Ohlson became a faculty member at the University of Illinois Chicago, later helping develop a master's program in public-health nursing and founding the Office of Global Health Leadership (originally the Office for International Studies). The UIC College of Nursing established the Virginia M. Ohlson Endowment on the occasion of Ohlson's retirement. It provides support to international degree-seeking students as well as UIC Nursing students seeking international experiences.

In 1991, Ohlson was awarded the Prestigious Butterfly, the Third Order of the Precious Crown by the emperor, the first non-Japanese citizen to be given that honor.

She was named a Living Legend by the American Academy of Nursing in 1995.

== Awards and recognition ==
- 1991: received Japan's Prestigious Butterfly, the Third Order of the Precious Crown
- 1995: named a Living Legend by the American Academy of Nursing in 1995.
