= Rheba de Tornyay =

Rheba de Tornyay (April 17, 1926 - September 27, 2013) was a nurse. She was named in the Living Legends of the American Academy of Nursing in 1995.

In 1984, she became dean of the University of Washington’s School of Nursing, which was ranked No. 1 by U.S. News & World Report during her tenure.

De Tornyay served as dean of the UCLA School of Nursing from 1971 to 1975.
