= Ernest Grant (nurse) =

American health care professional

Dr. Ernest Grant
- Education: PhD in Nursing from University of North Carolina at Greensboro
- Occupations: Nurse, public health professional
- Known for: 36th president of the American Nurses Association

Ernest Grant is an American nurse and educator living in Chapel Hill, North Carolina. In 2018, he began serving as the 36th president of the American Nurses Association (ANA). Notably, he is the first male to serve in this position. One of his goals has been to encourage diversity in nursing. Since being elected, the percentage of male nurses has increased. He also serves as adjunct faculty for the University of North Carolina at Chapel Hill School of Nursing.

Notably, he was the first African American to graduate from his LPN program, which kickstarted his nursing career.

"If it wasn’t for the community college system, I would not be where I am today. It was a leg up to continue my education."

== Education and awards ==
Grant earned his PhD in Nursing from the University of North Carolina at Greensboro in 2015. Prior to earning his PhD, Grant was presented the Nurse of the Year Award for his work treating those injured on 9/11. George W. Bush presented him with this award in 2002.

In 2022, Grant received an honorary Doctor of Science degree from the University of Wisconsin–Madison. He was named a Living Legend by the American Academy of Nursing in 2026.

== Professional work ==
Grant has extensive experience working with burn injuries. He worked at the North Carolina Jaycee Burn Center at the University of North Carolina at Chapel Hill. He has also taught burn education to U.S. soldiers prior to their deployment to Iraq and Afghanistan during the George W. Bush administration.

=== COVID-19 pandemic ===
Grant was instrumental in advocating for nurses' safety during the Personal protective equipment (PPE) supply shortage in early 2020.

Grant, an African American, signed up to participate in a COVID-19 vaccine trial to help rebuild trust with the Black community. During an interview with Black Enterprise, Grant commented, “I thought it was imperative to serve as a role model to not only nurses who need to be involved and included in COVID-19 vaccine development, but also for Black people who have been historically underrepresented when it comes to vaccine testing. As a result, it was especially important for me to be that representation, given the disproportionate effect of COVID-19 in our Black communities.”

Grant was also interviewed by David Greene (journalist) of NPR about his experience in the COVID-19 vaccine trial to help decrease vaccine hesitancy.
