= University of Washington School of Nursing =

School of Nursing
- Type: Public nursing school
- Established: 1945
- Dean: Azita Emami
- Faculty: 448
- Administrative staff: 199
- Students: 999
- Undergraduates: 424
- Postgraduates: 575
- Location: Seattle, Washington, United States; 47°39′02″N 122°18′33″W
- Campus: Urban
- Website: nursing.uw.edu

The University of Washington School of Nursing is the nursing school of the University of Washington.

The school offers five degree programs accredited by the Commission on Collegiate Nursing Education: one bachelors, two masters, and two doctoral. During the 2022–23 school year, 424 undergraduate students and 575 graduate students received instruction from 448 faculty members, including 63 tenure track faculty, 26 professorial faculty, 42 teaching associates, 40 clinical instructors, 40 fellows from the American Academy of Nursing, and 237 adjunct faculty.

== History ==
In the summer of 1918, the University of Washington began offering public health nursing courses in response to the impact of the Spanish flu on Washington's public health infrastructure. In 1921, the university formed the Department of Nursing and appointed Elizabeth Sterling Soule, the state health department's supervisor of public health nursing, as dean. The university began offering a bachelor's degree in nursing in 1923 and was the first university to do so on the West Coast. In 1931, the university began offering clinical training for nurses at Harborview Hospital. The Department of Nursing was renamed the School of Nursing Education in 1934 and in 1945, it became an independent School of Nursing. At the time of its founding, it was the West Coast's first nursing school and the second university-affiliated nursing school in the United States. Upon Soule's retirement as the school's first dean in 1950, she was named "The Mother of Nursing in the Pacific Northwest" by Time magazine. During Soule's tenure, Soule actively discouraged black students from applying and Lela Duffel was the only black student admitted to the school. In 2001, Dean Nancy Woods publicly acknowledged and apologized for the school's discriminatory past. In 2022, the school renamed the 'Elizabeth Soule Endowed Chair and Lecture' endowment, which had been named in Soule's honor,, to the 'School of Nursing Endowed Chair and Lecture for Health Promotion'. In February 2021, the school announced the establishment of the Center for Anti-racism in Nursing, and in May 2023 it was renamed the Manning Price Spratlen Center for Anti-Racism & Equity in Nursing.

In 1964, Dean Mary Tschudin, Dr. Katherine Hoffman, and Dr. Marjorie Batey developed a nursing research program with grant funding that aimed to define nursing as a research-based discipline. Research funding for the school increased from $26,000 per year in 1969 to more than $930,000 in 1976. In 1969, the school was the birthplace of Madeleine Leininger's Primex concept which emphasized the expanded role of nurses in providing primary care and preventative services. Dean Rheba de Tornyay developed the school's first PhD in nursing science in 1977 and the first recipient was Marcia Killien in 1982. In the late 1970s, Dr. Betty Giblin established the Sleep Research Laboratory, the first of its kind in the United States.

The school has been top-ranked nationally "in all surveys of schools of nursing conducted since 1984", an unprecedented 27 years without a break. In 2011, U.S. News & World Report rated it in a three-way tie for the top spot with Johns Hopkins University and the University of Pennsylvania. U.S. News & World Report 2020 Best Nursing Schools: Doctor of Nursing Practice ranked UW fourth in the country.

In 2011, the Seattle Times reported low morale and "internal strife" ... "within the school the situation was also exacerbated by budget cuts. Dean Marla Salmon tendered her resignation in May of the same year. Dr. Azita Emami was named Dean of UW School of Nursing starting July 1, 2013.

In 2020, Premera Blue Cross awarded the University of Washington a $4.7 million grant to establish the Rural Nursing Health Initiative. This initiative places nursing students in rural clinical practices across Washington State.

Emami left the position in 2023 to become dean of the Yale School of Nursing. In 2023, Allison Webel was named interim executive dean, effective August 1, following Emami’s departure. In 2024, the University of Washington announced Hilaire Thompson as the next executive dean of the School of Nursing effective August 1, 2024.

== Notable people ==
=== Notable faculty ===
- Kathryn Barnard, discovered role of mother-newborn interactions in early childhood development
- Madeleine Leininger, dean and nursing theorist
- Nancy Fugate Woods, dean and former president of the American Academy of Nursing
- Hilaire Thompson, appointed executive dean of the University of Washington School of Nursing August 2024
- Eeeseung Byun, Fellow of the American Academy of Nursing (2025)
- M. Rebecca O’Connor, Fellow of the American Academy of Nursing (2025)
- Megan Streur, Fellow of the American Academy of Nursing (2025)
- Katie A. Haerling, Fellow of the American Academy of Nursing (2025); University of Washington Tacoma School of Nursing and Healthcare Leadership
- Betty Bekemeier, recipient of the 2025 Friends of the National Institute of Nursing Research Welch/Woerner Path-Paver Award
- Mayumi Anne Willgerodt, editor of The Journal of School Nursing (beginning February 2025)

=== Notable alumni ===
- Margarethe Cammermeyer, LGBT rights activist
- Bobbi Campbell, AIDS activist
- Andrea Conte, First Lady of Tennessee (2003–2011)
- Kathi Mooney, cancer researcher and co-leader of the Cancer Control and Population Sciences Program at the Huntsman Cancer Institute
- Dawn Morrell, Washington state representative from Puyallup
- Kathleen M. Sutcliffe, Bloomberg Distinguished Professor of Medicine and Business at Johns Hopkins University
- Pamela H. Mitchell, recipient of the University of Washington Alumni Association’s 2025 Golden Graduate Distinguished Alumna Award
- Elizabeth Bridges, recipient of the University of Washington’s 2025 Distinguished Alumni Veteran Award; creator of the Battlefield and Disaster Nursing Pocket Guide
- Pamela Cipriano, president of the International Council of Nurses (elected 2021) and former president of the American Nurses Association (2014-2018); earned a Master of Science degree from the University of Washington School of Nursing (1981)
- Joanne Montgomery, recipient of the University of Washington’s 2022 Gates Volunteer Service Award
- Ekene Amaefule, recipient of the University of Washington Alumni Association’s 2024 Outstanding Staff Award
