= Margaret Miles =

British educationist (1911–1994)

Dame Margaret Miles, DBE (11 July 1911 – 26 April 1994) was a British educationist.

She served as Headmistress of Pate's Grammar School in Cheltenham between 1946 and 1952. She went on to be Headmistress of Mayfield School, Putney between 1952 and 1973.

A strong believer in equal education for all, she served as President of the Campaign for Comprehensive Education between 1979 and 1994. She studied at Bedford College, London (now Royal Holloway, University of London), later also receiving an honorary doctorate of the University of London.

Miles was appointed Dame Commander of the Most Excellent Order of the British Empire in 1970.
