= American Association of Colleges of Nursing =

- Logo of AACN
- Abbreviation: AACN
- Formation: 1969
- Headquarters: 655 K Street, NW; Suite 750; Washington, D.C., United States
- Members: 876 members
- Board Chair: Jean Giddens, PhD, RN
- President/CEO: Deborah E. Trautman, PhD, RN
- Website: www.aacnnursing.org

The American Association of Colleges of Nursing (AACN) is the national voice for academic nursing. AACN works to establish quality standards for nursing education; assists schools in implementing those standards; influences the nursing profession to improve health care; and promotes public support for professional nursing education, research, and practice. It was established in 1969, and represents more than 890 member schools of nursing at public and private universities nationwide.

== News & Data ==
To view AACN's latest news, visit: https://www.aacnnursing.org/news-data.

== Board of directors ==
- Chair: Julie Sanford, The University of Alabama
- Chair-Elect: Valerie Howard, The University of North Carolina at Chapel Hill
- Treasurer: Judith Karshmer, Arizona State University
- Secretary: Victoria Niederhauser, University of Tennessee Knoxville

Members-at-Large:

- Bimbola Akintade, East Carolina University
- Jackie Barber, Morningside University
- Lorna Finnegan, Loyola University Chicago
- Eileen Fry-Bowers, University of San Francisco
- Mary Ellen Smith Glasgow, Duquesne University
- Kimberly Hunter, University of Iowa Hospitals and Clinics
- Shannon Bright Smith, Florida A&M University
- Julie Swann, Emory Saint Joseph Hospital

President and Chief Executive Officer (ex officio): Deborah E. Trautman

== Graduate Nursing Student Academy ==
The Graduate Nursing Student Academy (GNSA) is a national division of the American Association of Colleges of Nursing that serves master's, doctoral, and post graduate nursing students. The GNSA functions as the national voice for graduate nursing students and promotes leadership, professional development, scholarly advancement, and advocacy engagement across graduate level programs in the United States.

The GNSA provides webinars, leadership development programs, networking opportunities, academic support resources, mentoring, and career development programming tailored for graduate level learners. The academy’s mission includes strengthening the graduate nursing pipeline and preparing students to assume leadership roles in clinical practice, academia, health systems management, and public policy.

A signature initiative of the academy is the GNSA Advocacy Leader Program. This program selects graduate nursing students nationally to participate in structured policy training and health advocacy engagement. Advocacy Leaders collaborate with AACN’s government affairs division, meet with federal stakeholders, promote awareness of nursing policy issues, and represent student perspectives within national policy discussions.

The GNSA also manages recognition programs, travel support for national conferences, student leadership awards, and professional development funding opportunities. Membership is free for all students enrolled in graduate nursing programs at AACN member institutions.

== Scholarship Opportunities ==
The American Association of Colleges of Nursing offers a number of different scholarships to nursing students around the country for outstanding academic performance, students who aspire to leadership positions in academic nursing, and/or those who are committed to making a positive impact on the nation's health and health care. They have partnered with companies like Liaison, Uniform Advantage, and Hurst Review to provide thousands of dollars in scholarships each year to students that apply and meet the requirements. Since the beginning of the Covid-19 pandemic, they have also started a scholarship program to help students that need financial support in order to complete their nursing programs and/or meet life expenses. Since the program was started in April 2020, they have disbursed a total of 158 awards.
