= TruMerit =

Non-profit organization

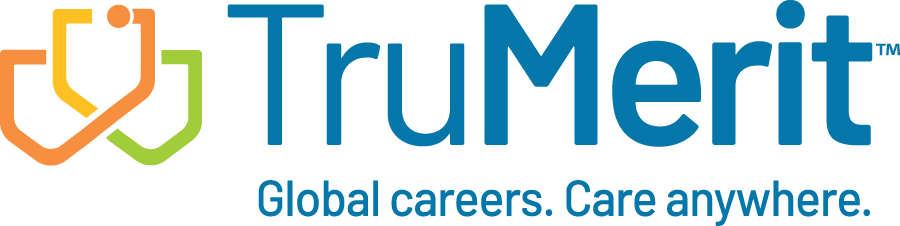
- Formation: 1977; 49 years ago
- Type: Nonprofit
- Tax ID no.: 23-2026352
- Headquarters: Philadelphia, Pennsylvania, U.S.
- Website: www.trumerit.org

TruMerit, formerly known as the Commission on Graduates of Foreign Nursing Schools (CGFNS), is a non-profit organization based in the United States that provides credential evaluation, verification, and examination services for foreign-educated nurses and allied healthcare professionals. The organization was founded in 1977 to address the need for a centralized and consistent method of assessing the qualifications of foreign-educated nurses seeking to work in the U.S.

== History ==
In the late 1960s, there was a growing influx of foreign-educated nurses migrating to the United States. During this period, concerns arose over the limited number of these nurses passing the U.S. registered nurse (RN) licensure exam. In March 1972, Mildred Schmidt of the New York State Education Department began working with Ruth Pell, the dean of the Lienhard School of Nursing at Pace University, to create specialized programs to assist foreign nurses in meeting U.S. licensure requirements. The program's development encountered initial hostility from New York City's Council of Nursing Directors. The council stated they were concerned about the potential conflict of interest due to Pace University's role in qualifying foreign nurses for positions that might otherwise be filled by graduates of U.S. nursing programs. Despite the initial resistance, Pace University proceeded with the program and received grants to launch classes aimed at enhancing both clinical nursing skills and English language proficiency among foreign nurses.

The success of this program led to broader discussions involving various stakeholders, including the American Nurses Association (ANA), the National League for Nursing (NLN), and the U.S. Department of Health, Education, and Welfare (HEW). During a 1975 HEW conference, representatives from nursing associations, state boards, healthcare organizations, and governmental bodies met to create a plan of action on how to address the licensure of foreign educated nurses wishing to practice in the US. In 1977, the W. K. Kellogg Foundation provided funding to the ANA and NLN to establish the Commission on Graduates of Foreign Nursing Schools (CGFNS).

In early 2025, the organization announced it was changing its name to TruMerit.

== See also ==
- Educational Commission for Foreign Medical Graduates
