= American Academy of Nursing =

Professional organization

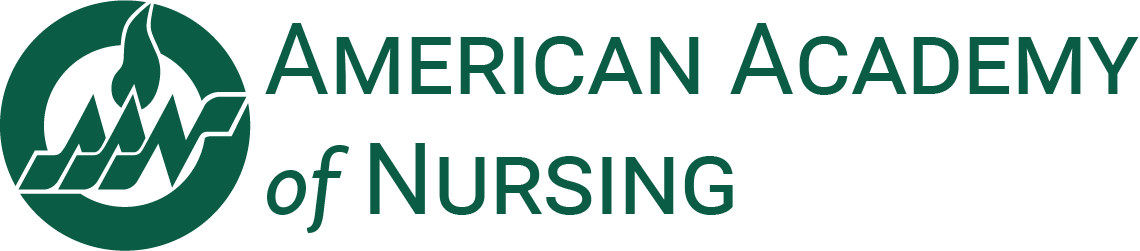
- Formation: 1973
- Purpose: to serve the public and nursing profession by advancing health policy and practice through the generation, synthesis, and dissemination of nursing knowledge
- Members: 3,500 selected Fellows
- President: Linda Scott https://aannet.org/news/news.asp?id=667809
- Affiliations: American Nurses Association
- Website: www.aannet.org

The American Academy of Nursing (AAN) is a professional organization that generates, synthesizes, and disseminates nursing knowledge to contribute to health policy and practice for the benefit of the public and the nursing profession. Founded in 1973, the organization is an independent affiliate of the American Nurses Association (ANA). The organization publishes a bimonthly journal known as Nursing Outlook.

Members of the organization are invited on the basis of leadership and accomplishments and designated as Fellows of the American Academy of Nursing (FAAN). This status should not be confused with the FAAN status granted by the American Academy of Neurology. Ninety percent of the Fellows are doctorally prepared; the others hold a master's degree and bachelor's degree. As of 2014, there are approximately 2300 members.

The academy's highest honor is its Living Legend designation. Nominees for Living Legend status must have held the FAAN designation for at least 15 years. As of December 2012, the organization has named 82 nurses as Living Legends.

== Presidents ==
- 1973–1974, Rheba de Tornyay
- 1974–1975, Faye Glenn Abdellah
- 1975–1976, Ellen C. Egan
- 1976–1977, Mary E. Reres
- 1977–1978, Donna C. Aguilera
- 1978–1979, Mary Elizabeth Carnegie
- 1979–1980, Linda Aiken
- 1980–1981, Mary E. Conway
- 1981–1983, Vernice Ferguson
- 1983–1985, Carolyn A. Williams
- 1985–1987, Gladys E. Sorensen
- 1987–1989, Rhetaugh Graves Dumas
- 1989–1991, Nancy Fugate Woods
- 1991–1993, Nola Pender
- 1993–1995, Angela B. McBride
- 1995–1997, Barbara A. Donaho
- 1997–1999, Joyce J. Fitzpatrick
- 1999–2001, Ada Sue Hinshaw
- 2001–2003, Margaret L. McClure
- 2003–2005, Joan L. Shaver
- 2005–2007, Linda Burnes Bolton
- 2007–2009, Pamela Mitchell
- 2009–2011, Catherine Gilliss
- 2011–2013, Joanne Disch
- 2013–2015, Diana Mason
- 2015–2017, Bobbie Berkowitz
- 2019-2021, Eileen Sullivan-Marx (President-Elect from 2017-2019)
- 2021-present, Kenneth R. White

== See also ==
- List of Living Legends of the American Academy of Nursing
