= American Nurses Association Hall of Fame =

U.S. nursing award

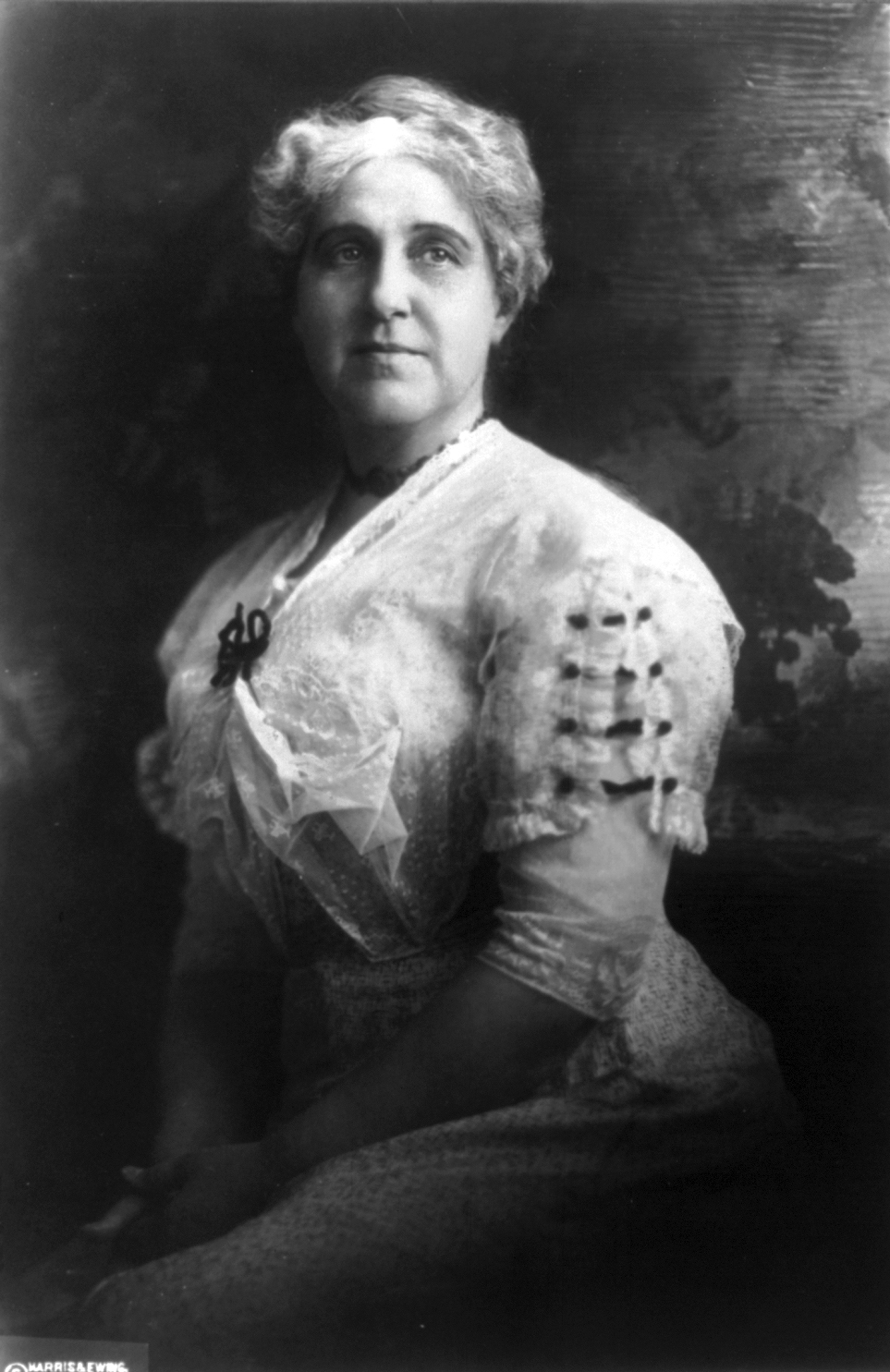
Jane Arminda Delano, founder of the American Red Cross Nursing Service

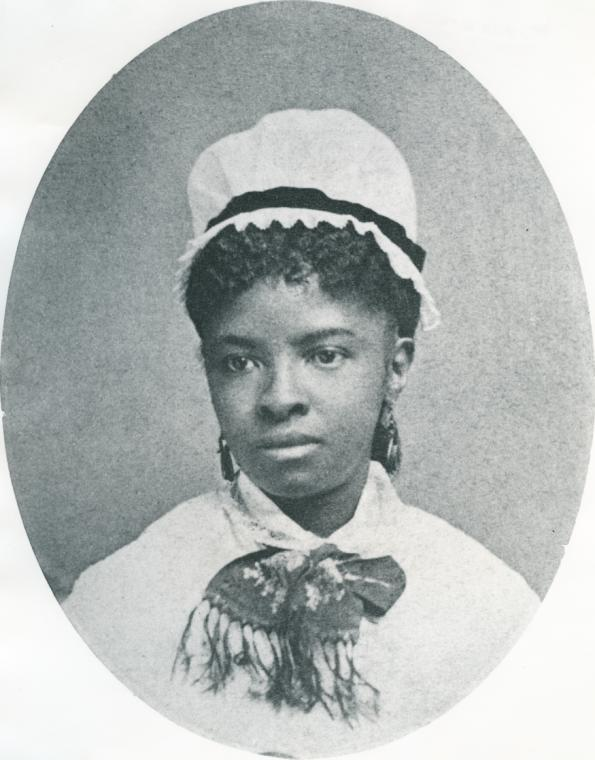
Mary Eliza Mahoney, first African American professionally trained nurse in the United States

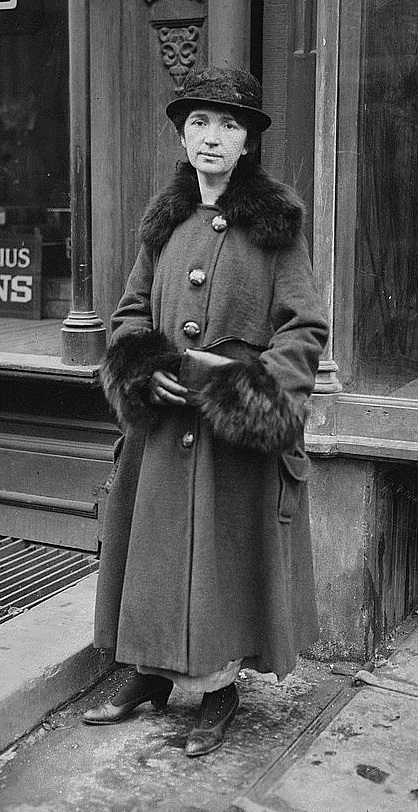
Margaret Sanger, birth control advocate

The American Nurses Association Hall of Fame or the ANA Hall of Fame is an award which recognizes the historical contributions to nursing in the United States.

== History ==
In 1974, in preparation for the United States Bicentennial, the American Nurses Association (ANA) created a seven-member committee to recognize the dedication and achievements of professional nurses in a Hall of Fame. Fifteen inaugural women were selected as inductees and the committee recommended that the nomination process and inductions become a permanent vehicle for recognition. In 1982, National Nurse's Day was proclaimed by President Ronald Reagan to be celebrated on May 6 and in conjunction with the celebration, the ANA at their annual convention, inducted six more nurses. The ANA board approved periodic addition of members thereafter, inducting new members in 1984, 1986, and 1996. In 1996, the criteria changed so that inductees did not have to be deceased and that inductions occur biennially.

== Criteria ==
The criteria for induction include that the nominees must be leaders in health, social or political policy which have had a sustaining impact on nursing in the United States. All candidates, unless they were working prior to 1873, must have completed a formal registered nursing program. Contributions to the field could have occurred locally or internationally, but must demonstrate their enduring value beyond the honoree's lifetime. Since 1996, inductees may be living or deceased.

== Inductees ==
ANA Hall of Fame
Name	Image	Birth–Death	Year	Area of achievement	Ref
Dorothea Lynde Dix		(1802–1887)	1976	mental health advocate and Civil War Superintendent of Army Nurses	
Lavinia Lloyd Dock		(1858–1956)	1976	textbook writer and author of standard nurse's manual of drugs	
Martha Minerva Franklin		(1870–1968)	1976	African American nurse organizer and founder of the National Association of Colored Graduate Nurses	
Annie Warburton Goodrich		(1866–1954)	1976	Dean of the Army School of Nursing and Dean of the first nursing program at Yale University	
Stella Goostray		(1886–1969)	1976	nursing scholar, author, and educator	
Clara Louise Maass		(1876–1901)	1976	volunteer in medical experiments for yellow fever	
Mary Eliza Mahoney		(1845–1926)	1976	first African American professional nurse in the U.S.	
Mary Adelaide Nutting		(1858–1948)	1976	the first nurse appointed as a university professor	
Sophia French Palmer		(1853–1920)	1976	co-founder and first editor of the American Journal of Nursing	
Linda Anne Judson Richards		(1841–1930)	1976	first trained nurse in the United States	
Isabel Adams Hampton Robb		(1860–1910)	1976	first president of the American Nurses Association	
Margaret H. Sanger		(1879–1966)	1976	opened the first birth control clinic in the United States	
Isabel Maitland Stewart		(1878–1963)	1976	leader in the development of nursing curriculum	
Adah Belle Samuel Thoms		(1870–1943)	1976	director of the Lincoln School for Nurses and president of the National Association of Colored Graduate Nurses for seven years	
Lillian D. Wald		(1867–1940)	1976	was an early advocate for Public health nursing, and advocated to have nurses in public schools. She founded the Henry Street Settlement in New York City and The Henry Street Settlement Visiting Nurse Service, which eventually became the Visiting Nurse Service of New York.	
Mary Breckinridge		(1881–1965)	1982	founder of the Frontier Nursing Service	
Mary E. P. Davis		(1840–1924)	1982	co-founder/manager of American Journal of Nursing	
Jane Arminda Delano		(1862–1919)	1982	founder of the American Red Cross Nursing Service	
Mary May Roberts		(1877–1959)	1982	editor for 28 years of American Journal of Nursing	
Julia Catherine Stimson		(1881–1948)	1982	Superintendent of the Army Nurse Corps	
Shirley Carew Titus		(1892–1967)	1982	nursing labor organizer	
Helen Lathrop Bunge		(1906–1970)	1984	executive officer of the Institute of Research and Services at Teachers College Nursing Education division	
Margaret Baggett Dolan		(1914–1974)	1984	19th president of the American Nurses Association	
Katharine Jane Densford		(1890–1978)	1984	president of the American Nurses Association, vice-president of the International Council of Nurses	
Ruth Benson Freeman		(1906–1982)	1984	public health nurse educator	
Alma Elizabeth Gault		(1891–1981)	1984	dean of the Meharry Medical College School of Nursing	
Janet M. Geister		(1885–1964)	1984	researcher, conducted governmental studies of children's day care centers	
Lydia Eloise Hall		(1906–1969)	1984	long-term and chronic disease control theorist	
Estelle Massey Osborne		(1901–1981)	1984	first black nurse to earn a master's degree in the U.S.	
Frances Reiter		(1904–1977)	1984	first dean of the Graduate School of Nursing at New York Medical College	
Emilie Gleason Sargent		(1894–1977)	1984	executive director of the Detroit Visiting Nursing Association for 40 years	
Anne Hervey Strong		(1876–1925)	1984	director of the Simmons College School of Public Health Nursing	
Julia Charlotte Thompson		(1907–1972)	1984	director of the American Nurses Association and its first full-time lobbyist	
Ellwynne Mae Vreeland		(1909–1971)	1984	developed the first nationwide extramural federal nursing research program	
Mary Berenice Beck		(1890–1960)	1986	earned the first nursing education doctorate of the Catholic University of America	
Adda Eldredge		(1865–1955)	1986	instrumental in securing passage of an Illinois nursing practice act and became license holder #1	
Mary Sewall Gardner		(1871–1961)	1986	author of the first text on Public Health Nursing in the United States	
Elizabeth Sterling Soule		(1884–1972)	1986	established the Department of Nursing at the University of Washington	
Effie J. Taylor		(1874–1970)	1986	pioneer in psychiatric and mental health nursing	
Florence Guinness Blake		(1907–1983)	1996	advanced education in pediatric nursing	
Florence Aby Blanchfield		(1882–1971)	1996	first woman to receive a military commission in the regular army of the U.S.	
Dorothy Cornelius		(1918–1992)	1996	only nurse to serve as president of the American Nurses Association, the American Journal of Nursing and for the International Council of Nurses	
Virginia A. Henderson		(1897–1996)	1996	theorist and researcher—authored one of the most definitive descriptions of nursing	
Katherine J. Hoffman		(1910–1984)	1996	first nurse to earn a doctorate in the state of Washington	
Anna Caroline Maxwell		(1851–1929)	1996	trained nurses for the Spanish–American War and spurred the establishment of the Army Nurse Corps	
Lucille Elizabeth Notter		(1907–1993)	1996	co-creator and first full-time editor of Nursing Research	
Agnes K. Ohlson		(1902–1991)	1996	spearheaded standardization of nurse licensing requirements throughout the U.S.	
Mary D. Osborne		(1875–1946)	1996	pioneering maternity nurse	
Sara Elizabeth Parsons		(1864–1949)	1996	founded nurse training schools to advance psychiatric nursing	
Elizabeth Kerr Porter		(1894–1989)	1996	nurse educator and nursing rights advocate	
Martha Elizabeth Rogers		(1914–1994)	1996	developed the theory of the Science of Unitary Human Beings	
Mabel Keaton Staupers		(1890–1989)	1996	advocate for racial equality in the nursing profession	
Florence S. Wald		(1917–2008)	1996	founder of the first hospice program in the U.S.	
Mary Opal Wolanin		(1910–1997)	1996	expert in eldercare who advocated for inclusion of gerontological information in nursing curricula	
Annie Damer		(1858–1915)	1998	president of the first Board of Nursing Examiners	
Clara Dutton Noyes		(1869–1936)	1998	World War I director of the Red Cross' Bureau of Nursing	
Hildegard Peplau		(1909–1999)	1998	pioneer advocate for patient-nurse relationships and psychiatric nursing	
Dorothy E. Reilly		(1920–1996)	1998	scholar and educator, who focused on the development of nursing education	
Dorothy M. Smith		(1913–1997)	1998	founding dean of the University of Florida College of Nursing	
Mary Elizabeth Carnegie		(1916–2008)	2000	author, educator and advocate for removal of racial barriers in the nursing profession	
Signe Skott Cooper		(1921–)	2000	Developed the concept of continuing nursing education	
Maggie Jacobs		(1943–1992)	2000	instrumental in the development of the New York City municipal health care system and advocate for health services for the poor	
Undine Sams		(1919–1999)	2000	implemented integration of the Florida Nurses Association	
Margretta Madden Styles		(1930–2005)	2000	architect of the 1970s comprehensive study of nursing credentialing, which established national standards of nursing practices	
Sadie Heath Cabaniss		(1863–1921)	2002	developed the first nurses' training school in Virginia	
Harriet Patience Dame		(1815–1900)	2002	her service during the Civil War inspired Congress provide pensions to battlefield and hospital nurses of the conflict	
Veronica Margaret Driscoll		(1926–1994)	2002	collective bargaining and labor organizer for New York nurses	
Mary Lewis Wyche		(1858–1936)	2002	advocate of regulation of nursing practice and standards in North Carolina	
Susie Walking Bear Yellowtail		(1903–1981)	2002	instrumental in modernizing the Indian Health Service and eliminate abuses in care provided to Native Americans	
Luther Christman		(1915–2011)	2004	first man to hold the position of dean at a nursing school	
Imogene King		(1923–2007)	2004	pioneering nurse theorist	
Hattie M. Bessent		(1908–2015)	2008	first African American nurse to receive a PhD at Florida A&M University and first tenured African American nurse at the University of Florida	
Nettie Birnbach		(1926–2019)	2010	president of the New York State Nurses Association	
Claire M. Fagin		(1926–2025)	2010	first woman to serve as a university president with an Ivy League university, when she was named interim president of the University of Pennsylvania	
John F. Garde		(1935–2009)	2010	pioneering nurse anesthetist	
Ada K. Jacox		(?)	2010	researcher and educator specializing in pain management	
John Devereaux Thompson		(1917–1992)	2010	influenced policy on Medicare reimbursement procedures and a pioneer in functional hospital architecture and design	
Faye Glenn Abdellah		(1919–2017)	2012	first woman to serve as U.S. Deputy Surgeon General	
Josephine Dolan		(1913–2004)	2012	nursing historian and first faculty member at the University of Connecticut School of Nursing	
Eleanor C. Lambertsen		(1916–1998)	2012	pioneered the concept of interdisciplinary team nursing to improve patient care	
Mary Lee Mills		(1912–2010)	2012	chief nursing officer of the U.S. Public Health Service and consultant on national health systems to the Secretary of the U.S. Department of Health, Education and Welfare	
Margaret D. Sovie		(1933–2002)	2012	educator and researcher who helped establish criteria for nurse recognition programs	
Russell E. Tranbarger		(?)	2012	administrator, educator and advocate for male nursing	
Barbara Thoman Curtis		(1938–2015)	2014	organized the first political action committee for the ANA	
Pearl McIver		(1893–1976)	2014	chief nurse of the U.S. Public Health Service	
Mary Ellen Patton		(?)	2014	nursing labor advocate for improving labor conditions of health service workers	
Robert V. Piemonte		(1934–2020)	2014	first male nursing EdD recipient to head the National Student Nurses' Association	
Jessie M. Scott		(1915–2009)	2014	pushed for passage and helped implement the Nurse Training Act	
Muriel Poulin		(?)	2016	after serving in numerous international posts, established the first nursing master's degree program in Spain	
Patricia Messmer		(?)	2016	chair of the Nurses Charitable Trust	
M. Louise Fitzpatrick		(?) – 2017	2018	a visionary leader and champion for the nursing profession, passionate about international health care and nursing education.	
Barbara Drew		(?)	2018	cardiovascular nursing research bringing valuable improvements to patient care and nursing scholarship	
Rose Constantino		(?)	2020		
Jeri Milstead		(?)	2020		
Tim Porter-O'Grady		(?)	2020		
Anne P. Manton		(1940–2024)	2022		
Barbara L. Nichols		(1939–)	2022		
