= Janet Wilson James =

American historian and educator

- Born: December 23, 1918; New York City, New York, U.S.
- Died: June 10, 1987 (aged 68); Cambridge, Massachusetts, U.S.
- Education: BA, Smith College (1939); MA, Bryn Mawr College (1940); PhD, Radcliffe College (1954)
- Occupations: Historian, Educator
- Employer(s): Smith College; Harvard University; Mills College; Wellesley College; Boston College
- Notable work: Notable American Women, 1607-1950: A Biographical Dictionary; Changing Ideas about Women in the United States, 1776-1825; A Lavinia Dock Reader
- Spouse: Edward T. James
- Children: Ned, Lucy

Janet Wilson James (December 23, 1918 – June 10, 1987) was an American historian, educator, and pioneer in the field of women's history. As a professor at Boston College, James played a significant role in the development of the Women's Studies program, later renamed the Women's and Gender Studies program, and mentored young women scholars. The annual Janet James Award at Boston College acknowledges her legacy by recognizing undergraduate students' academic achievements and personal commitment to women's and gender issues.

== Early life and education ==
Janet Wilson James was born in New York City on December 23, 1918, to Helen Peters Wilson and Willard O. Wilson, an automobile distributor. She had a challenging relationship with her mother, who suffered from depression, but formed a close bond with her sister, Lucy Wilson Benson. In 1928, the family relocated to Dallas, Texas, where James graduated from the Hockaday School for Girls in 1935. She received her BA from Smith College in 1939 and her MA from Bryn Mawr College in 1940. She returned to Smith College in 1940 as a teaching fellow and teaching assistant for Ray Allen Billington, remaining there until 1942.

In 1942, James began doctoral work at Radcliffe College, studying women's history with Arthur Schlesinger Sr. The following year, she became one of the first women tutors in history and literature at Harvard University.

== Career ==
In 1950, James and her husband, Edward T. James, moved to Oakland, California, where they both taught at Mills College until 1953. They received their PhDs in 1954, and Janet's dissertation, Changing Ideas about Women in the United States, 1776-1825, was published in 1981. In 1954, she became a history instructor at Wellesley College, but resigned in 1955 to move to New York and focus on motherhood.

The family returned to Massachusetts in 1958, and James resumed her career in 1961, assisting Edward as an editor of Notable American Women, 1607-1950: A Biographical Dictionary. She served as director of the Schlesinger Library from July 1965 to December 1968 and was a member of the Library's Advisory Committee.

In 1971, James joined the faculty of Boston College as an instructor in the history department, becoming the first female member of that department. She taught courses on social, women's, and health care history, and was promoted to full professor in 1981. Her later research focused on the history of nursing, particularly the work of Lavinia Dock, a militant feminist nurse. James edited A Lavinia Dock Reader, published in 1985.

James was a member of several professional organizations, including the American Association for the History of Nursing and the Organization of American Historians. She was an active participant in the Berkshire Conferences on the History of Women.

=== Notable American Women, 1607-1950: A Biographical Dictionary ===
James and her spouse collaborated as editors on the three-volume reference work Notable American Women, 1607-1950. This biographical dictionary, containing details about the lives and achievements of 1,300 women, is now recognized as a foundational resource that paved the way for the establishment of Women's Studies within the broader context of American historical research. The Notable American Women series was later expanded with a fourth installment, The Modern Period, co-written by Barbara Sicherman and Carol Green, the latter of whom was also an historian engaged in shaping the Women's and Gender Studies program at Boston College.

=== Influence on Boston College ===
As the first female faculty member in the History Department at Boston College, Professor James advocated for the integration of women's history and Women's Studies into the academic curriculum. In addition, she chaired the Women's Affirmative Action Council, which contributed to the emergence of female leadership at the university. A former student described her lasting impact as follows: “Janet’s courageous persistence created the space for women to follow.”

The Janet James Award is an annual recognition that commemorates her legacy by acknowledging the accomplishments of students who are committed to furthering the fields of gender equality and women's rights in academia.

== Publications ==
- James, J. W. (1971). Notable American Women, 1607-1950: A Biographical Dictionary.
- James, J. W. (1981). Changing Ideas about Women in the United States, 1776-1825.
- James, J. W. (1983). Women at Work: A Massachusetts Historical Society Picture Book.
- James, J. W. (Ed.). (1985). A Lavinia Dock Reader.
- James, J. W. (Ed.). (1980). Women in American Religion.

== Personal life and death ==
Through her studies with Arthur Schlesinger, James met Edward T. James, a fellow historian and a Harvard alumnus. They married in 1945 while Edward was serving in the U.S. Navy. The couple had two children, Ned, born in 1954, and Lucy, born in 1957.

James died of cancer in Cambridge, Massachusetts, on June 10, 1987.
