= Eleanor C. Lambertsen =

American nurse

- Born: January 2, 1916; Fanwood, New Jersey, United States
- Died: March 30, 1998 (aged 82); Gladwyne, Pennsylvania, United States
- Occupation: Nursing
- Awards: American Nurses Association Hall of Fame

Eleanor C. Lambertsen (January 2, 1916 – March 30, 1998) was an American nurse. She was noted for a dissertation called Nursing Team Organization and Functioning which was later published as a book. Lambertsen's concept revolutionized nursing's and health care's organization and delivery. She received several awards for her achievements, and was inducted into the American Nurses Association Hall of Fame in 2012.

== Biography ==
=== Early career ===
Lambertsen was born in 1916 in Fanwood, New Jersey. She had two brothers. Lambertsen began her career in nursing in the 1930s, working as a bedside nurse while studying at Overlook Hospital. She graduated from the hospital in 1938. Lambertsen was named the school's director of its nursing department five years later, and became its acting director in 1946. She earned a bachelor of science degree in 1949, later a bachelor's in the following year, and became a Doctor of Education in 1957 from Teachers College, Columbia University. Her dissertation brought forward an idea of team nursing called Nursing Team Organization and Functioning. It was published as a book by Teachers College Press in 1953. The result led to Lambertsen leading a dissertation project at Francis Delafield Hospital which attracted many hospital administrators from across the United States who wanted to pursue the reorganization of their staff.

Her plan called for registered nurses to work closer with physicians to oversee the care of patients and set treatment goals and to coordinate the roles of nurses. Lambertsen was named as the American Hospital Association's (AHA) first director of the division of nursing in 1958. While at AHA, she also served as the organization's assistant secretary of professional practices. Lambertsen later became Teachers College's director of their division of nursing between 1961 and 1968. She was made their director of all health services in the same year. Lambertsen was appointed dean of Cornell University-New York Hospital School of Nursing in 1970, and was made their senior associate director four years later. That same year, she became the first nurse to serve on the board Empire Blue Cross and Blue Shield, where she remained for the next 12 years. Lambertsen later served as the board's vice-chairman between 1981 and 1986.

=== Later career and death ===
She held various positions and had influence to a large variety of organizations, where Lambertsen was heavily involved in developing some of nursing's most important advances. Throughout the 1970s and 1980s, Lambertsen managed a consulting business which served to broaden nursing education across the globe. She had also been on the World Health Organization's expert advisory council on nursing from 1961 to 1982. From 1963 to 1975, she was the Visiting Nurse Service of New York's director, and served as chairwoman of the New York State Nurses Association Council of Research in Nursing between 1972 and 1976. She died on March 30, 1998, in a nursing home in Gladwyne, Pennsylvania, and was preceded in death by her husband Joseph Anderson. On November 3, a memorial service for Lambertsen was held at the Weill Medical College of Cornell University.

== Legacy ==
One of Lambertsen's students described her as "a champion of advanced practice who was willing to stand up to the power structure with determination and grit." Her influence allowed generations of clinical nurse specialists and nurse practitioners to independently practice their workload. Her concept to team nursing revolutionized nursing's organization and delivery of nursing and health care.

Lambertsen received several honors and awards during her lifetime. She was a recipient of the R. Louise McManus Award from the Nursing Education Alumni Association at Teachers College. Lambertsen garnered honorary recognition from the American Nursing Association and the New York State Nurses Association, and gained membership to the National Academy of Medicine; she was made an honorary fellow of the AHA. In 1989, she was inducted into the Health Care Hall of Fame. Lambertsen was inducted into the American Nurses Association Hall of Fame in 2012.
