= Nell V. Beeby =

Indian-born American nurse

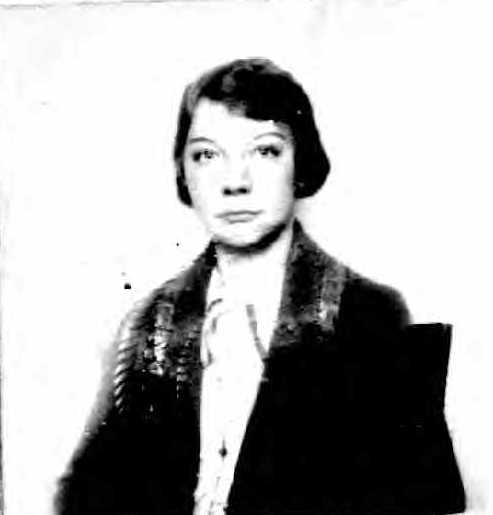
- Born: August 1, 1896; Secunderabad
- Died: May 17, 1957 (aged 60); Jackson Heights
- Occupation: Nurse, editor

Nell Viola Beeby (August 1, 1896 – May 17, 1957) was an Indian-born American nurse. She was a nursing educator in China and went on to become editor-in-chief of The American Journal of Nursing.

== Early life and education ==
Nell V. Beeby was born on August 1, 1896, in Secunderabad, India, one of the four daughters and six children of William Henry Beeby and Clara Bridge Beeby, Baptist missionaries. The Beeby family returned to the United States and Beeby grew up in Urbana, Illinois, where she graduated from Urbana High School in 1916. In 1919, she graduated from the St. Luke's Hospital School of Nursing in Chicago and became an obstetrics nurse at St. Luke's.

== China ==
After failing to secure a nursing position with the Baptist Board of Foreign Missions, in 1924 Beeby was appointed by Yale-in-China to a four-year term as supervisor and instructor in obstetrical and surgical nursing at the Hsiang-Ya Nursing School (now the nursing school of Central South University) in Changsha, Hunan Province, China. Students and observers described her as a personable and effective teacher. Her term in China was cut short by the Chinese Civil War in 1927, forcing her and others to evacuate to Shanghai. After leaving China, Beeby would throughout her career assist Chinese nurses with helping them obtain scholarships, textbooks, and medical equipment. Beeby also served on the board of directors of the American Bureau for Medical Aid to China (ABMAC). Chinese nurse Major-General Zhou Meiyu wrote on Beeby's death, "During the last fifteen years, she spent much of her valuable time and effort in helping her Chinese nurses, through many channels. She understood the turmoil periods we have gone through. We are deeply indebted to her generosity and guidance."

Back in the United States, Beeby became supervisor of the obstetrics department at St. Luke's Hospital. While working there she published four articles in The American Journal of Nursing.

== The American Journal of Nursing ==
In 1934, she began attending the Teachers College of Columbia University. She would spend the rest of her life in New York City. She graduated with a B.S. in nursing in 1936.

While at Columbia, she began her long association with The American Journal of Nursing, becoming part-time assistant news editor in 1934. One of her colleagues wrote: "During her early years with the Journal, her "nose for news" directed her, almost instinctively, to any meeting, whether local, state, or national, related to programs of maternal and child health." In 1936, she joined the Journal full-time as assistant editor. In 1945, she spent two months as a foreign correspondent reporting on nurses in Europe during World War II.

In 1948, Beeby succeeded Mary M. Roberts as editor-in-chief of The American Journal of Nursing. During her tenure, monthly circulation increased 40,000 to 160,000 and AJN;s parent company launched two new journals, Nursing Outlook and Nursing Research. Following a cancer diagnosis, Beeby stepped down in 1956.

Nell V. Beeby died on 17 May 1957 in Jackson Heights, Queens, New York.

== Awards and honors ==
In February 1957, Nell V. Beeby was awarded the Mary Adelaide Nutting Award for leadership in nursing by the National League for Nursing. The award citation stated "Through clinical and classroom teaching, and through your editorial work [...] you have continued to stimulate improvement in standards of nursing practice in this and other countries."
