= William Schevill =

William Schevill may refer to:

- William E. Schevill (1906–1994), American paleontologist
- William Valentine Schevill (1864–1951), American artist
