= AJN =

AJN may refer to:

- American Journal of Nursing
- The Australian Jewish News
