= Jessie Scott =

Jessie Scott may refer to:

- Jessie Scott (doctor) (1883–1959), New Zealand doctor, medical officer and prisoner of war
- Jessie Rae Scott (1929–2010), First Lady of North Carolina, 1969–1973
- Jessie Scott (Shortland Street), a character on the New Zealand soap opera Shortland Street
- Jessie M. Scott (1915–2009), American nurse and healthcare administrator
