= Katharine DeWitt =

American nurse and journal editor

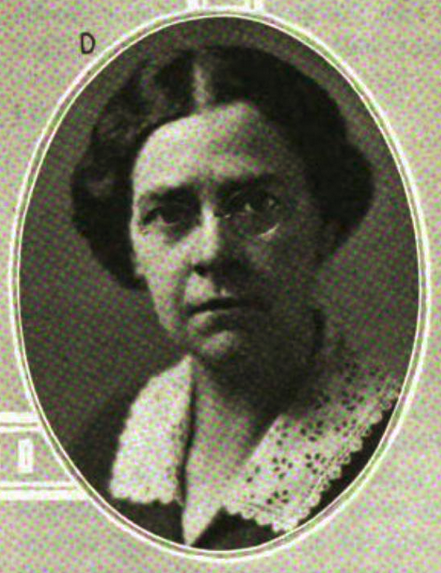
- American Journal of Nursing, 1925
- Born: June 11, 1867; Troy, Rensselaer County, New York
- Died: March 12, 1963 (aged 93); Poughkeepsie, New York
- Burial place: Old Mount Ida Cemetery, Troy, New York
- Education: Mt. Holyoke Seminary
- Occupations: Nurse, writer and editor

Katharine DeWitt (1867–1963) was an American nurse, writer and co-editor of the American Journal of Nursing.

== Life and work ==
DeWitt was born June 11, 1867, as one of five children, in Troy, New York, to Mary Hastings and Abner DeWitt. She graduated from Mount Holyoke Seminary in 1887.

Although, she initially intended to become a teacher, DeWitt entered the Illinois Training School to learn nursing and graduated in 1891. According to one biography, "It is possible that her assignment to assist the resident physician in the dispensary during her senior year at Mt. Holyoke may have influenced her choice." It goes on to say "she was always more interested in her patients than their diseases."

She worked for 16 years as a private duty nurse based in Chicago and was often called to attend to patients out of state, including Massachusetts, North Carolina and Ohio. She returned to the Illinois Training School to finish postgraduate work in obstetrical nursing, working chiefly with Dr. Joseph B. DeLee, an internationally known obstetrician and vocal proponent of the prophylactic forceps. In those days of home nursing, she remained busy with her scheduled patients but also lectured in Illinois Training School classes of aspiring private duty nurses.

In 1910, DeWitt chaired an early conference devoted wholly to private duty nursing by the National Association. Topics included "Ethical Problems," "The Private Duty Nurse in the Hospital," "The Private Duty Nurse in the Rural Home" and two popular papers on "Missionary Nursing.

She was a contributor to the first issue of the American Journal of Nursing, October 1900. When an overworked journal editor needed an assistant in 1907, DeWitt was named co-editor. When the editor-in-chief, Sophia French Palmer, died suddenly in 1920, DeWitt was managing editor until a year later when Mary May Roberts was named the journal's co-editor and the two nurses did the job together. DeWitt resigned from her editing position "of her own volition" on December 31, 1932, leaving Roberts as sole editor.

Throughout her life she published guidance about nursing and the role of those who work in the profession.

DeWitt died March 12, 1963, in Poughkeepsie, New York, and was buried in Old Mount Ida Cemetery in Troy, New York.

== Selected publications ==
- DeWitt, K. (1904). The training of babies. The American Journal of Nursing, 4(8), 588-591.
- DeWitt, K. (1907). Operating-Room Procedures. The American Journal of Nursing, 7(7), 526-533.
- Dewitt, K. (1909). The County Association and Its Relation to the State. The American Journal of Nursing, 9(11), 809-815.
- DeWitt, K. (1910). The Private Duty Nurse: Her Life, Her Ideal, Her Needs. The American Journal of Nursing, 10(5), 308-311.
- DeWitt, K. (1933). News from a Far Country. American Journal of Nursing, 33(6), 605.
- DeWitt, K. (1950). The journal's first fifty years. American Journal of Nursing, 50(10), 590-596
