= Annie Damer =

Canadian-American public health nurse and health administrator

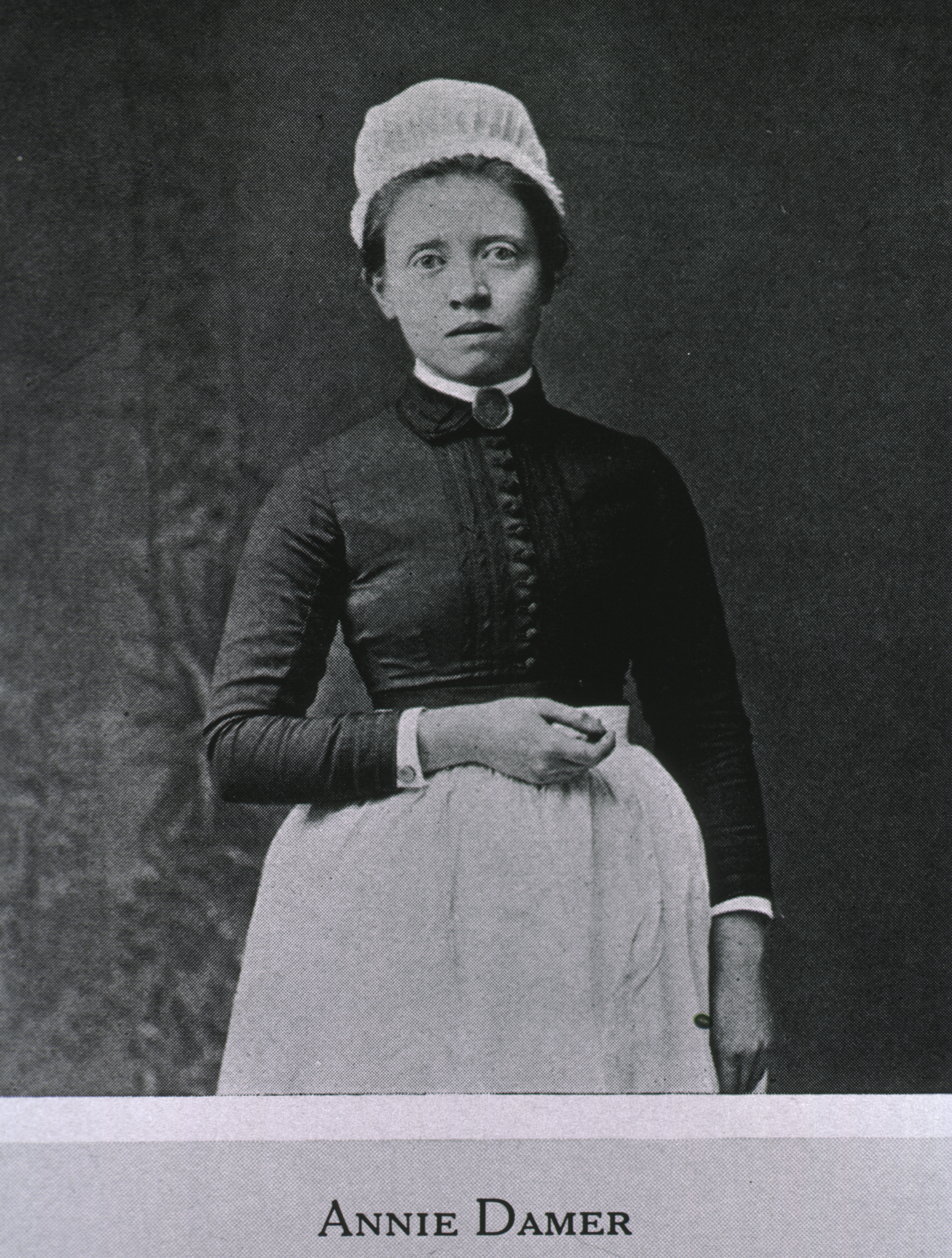
Annie Damer

Annie Damer (November 30, 1858 – August 8, 1915) was a Canadian-American public health nurse and a “pioneer in establishing tuberculosis nursing in New York State”. She also held executive positions in various public health organizations.

== Biography ==
Annie Damer was born as Mary Annie on November 30, 1858, in Guelph, a city in Southwestern Ontario, Canada. In 1871 her family moved to Toronto. In 1882 she got admission in New York City Training School, which was under the Bellevue Hospital. She graduated in 1885, and continued her studies in law at the University of the City of New York. She started her professional career as a private duty nurse but later became a public health nurse.

During 1893 – 1898, she worked as public health nurse in Buffalo Charity Organization. In 1898 she joined the Bellevue Hospital and initiated number reforms to control the spread of tuberculosis with the help of visiting nurses. She extensively worked with tuberculosis patients, and created social services department.

In 1906 she left the Bellevue Hospital and started working as a supervisor at convalescent home for children. She also served as the president of the American Journal of Nursing Company. She was associated with number of health professional organizations including Buffalo Nurses Association, New York State Nurses Association and American Nurses Association. She advocated the importance of preparing “nursing students with the idea of civic responsibility.” For nurses, she also advanced the ideas of self-governing while at school, and the need for advocating right to vote.

In recognizing her pioneering leadership in public health, in 1998, she was inducted into the American Nurses Association Hall of Fame.

She met an accident in 1910, and remained inactive for five years. She died in New York City on August 8, 1915.
