= Barbara Curtis =

Barbara Curtis may refer to:

- Barbara Thoman Curtis (1938–2015), American nurse and activist
- Barbara Sutton Curtis (1930–2019), American jazz pianist
