= Stella Goostray =

American nurse (1886–1969)

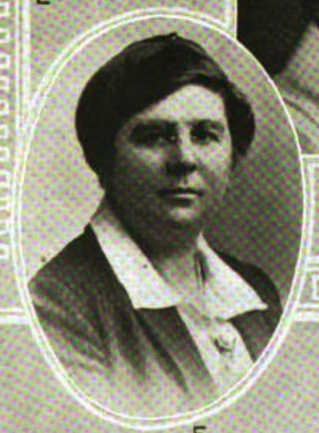
- Portrait from American Journal of Nursing, 1925
- Born: July 8, 1886; Boston, Massachusetts, US
- Died: 1969 (aged 82–83)
- Education: Boston Children's Hospital; Bachelor of Science in Nursing from Teachers College, Columbia University; M.E. from Boston University
- Occupations: Nurse, author, educator
- Known for: President of the National Nursing Council for War Service during World War II
- Awards: Inducted into the American Nurses Association Hall of Fame (1976)

Stella Goostray (July 8, 1886 – 1969) was an American nurse, author and educator. Between 1940 and 1946, she was president of the National Nursing Council for War Service during World War II. In 1976, she was inducted into the American Nurses Association Hall of Fame.

== Biography ==
Stella Goostray was born in Boston, Massachusetts, US, on July 8, 1886.

She graduated from Boston Children's Hospital in 1919. She received a Bachelor of Science degree in nursing from Teachers College, Columbia University and an M.E. from Boston University, which later conferred on her with an honorary D.Sc. in 1967.

Between 1921 and 1927, she served as a faculty at the Philadelphia General Hospital of Nursing. In 1927, she became superintendent of nurses and then the director of the school of nursing and nursing service at Children's Hospital, Boston, a position she held until her retirement in 1946.

In 1930, she was the chairman of the sub-committee of the White House conference on child health and protection. From 1930 to 1934, she worked as a nurse consultant to the Committee on the Grading of Nursing Schools.

She also had a long association with National League for Nursing Education, and served as its secretary for 11 years. She also served 13 years on the board of directors of the American Journal of Nursing company, seven as president.

== Publications ==
She authored several nursing publications. Some of her publications include

- Drugs and Solutions for Nurses,
- Mathematics and Measurements in Nursing Practice,
- Applied Chemistry for Nurses,
- Fifty Years: A History of the School of Nursing, the Children's Hospital, Boston, and
- Memoirs: Half a Century in Nursing.
