= Nettie Birnbach =

American nurse (1926–2019)

Nettie Sodikow Birnbach (March 2, 1926 – December 18, 2019) was an American nurse, educator and arts patron. In 2010, Birnbach was inducted into the American Nurses Association Hall of Fame for her contribution to the nursing profession. Birnbach was a past president of the New York State Nurses Association and president of the American Association for the History of Nursing.

== Biography ==
Nettie Sodikow was born on March 2, 1926 in New York to Fred and Sophie Pomerantz Sodikow. Sodikow later undertook nursing studies at Kings County School of Nursing in Brooklyn, New York. During World War II, Sodikow served in the United States Cadet Nursing Corps. After the war, she worked as a nurse at Willard Parker Hospital in New York.

After marrying Marvin Birnbach, Nettie Birnbach returned to education, where she earned a Bachelors in nursing from Molloy College in Rockville Centre, New York and later, a masters in Nursing education and a Doctorate in education from Teachers College, Columbia University. After working as a nurse for 18 years, Birnbach became a nursing educator at the College of Nursing, State University of New York at Brooklyn. Birnbach authored several books, articles and papers on community nursing and the history of nursing.

In 1991, Birnbach became the president of the New York State Nurses Association, and in 1998, the president of the American Association for the History of Nursing. In 2010, Dr. Birnbach was inducted into the Teachers College Nursing Hall of Fame. That year, she was also inducted into the American Nurses Association Hall of Fame.

In 1994, Birnbach moved to Boca Raton, Florida where she became known for her patronage and support of the local arts scene. There, she was a frequent sponsor of musical performances at the Kravis Center. In 2011, Birnbach was named Volunteer of the Year by the Kravis Center for the Performing Arts. In 2016, Birnbach established the Nettie Birnbach Endowed Scholarship for Piano Education at Lynn University, one of the first named scholarships for piano students.
