= Mary Wyche =

American nurse

- Born: Mary Lewis Wyche; February 26, 1858; Henderson, North Carolina, United States
- Died: August 22, 1936 (aged 78)
- Education: University of North Carolina at Chapel Hill
- Occupation: Nurse
- Years active: 1898–1925
- Awards: American Nurses Association Hall of Fame

Mary Lewis Wyche (February 26, 1858 – August 22, 1936) was an American nurse. She was an advocate of regulation of nursing practice and standards in North Carolina and is considered by many people to be the pioneer of organized nursing in North Carolina. Wyche created a successful objective in legalizing registered nurses in North Carolina, and wrote a book on nursing history. She was inducted into the American Nurses Association Hall of Fame in 2002.

== Biography ==
=== Early life ===
Wyche was born on February 26, 1858, near Henderson, North Carolina. She was the daughter of Benjamin and Sarah Hunter Wyche. Wyche had multiple siblings which included six sisters. While she was a young woman, she wanted to become a nurse but was prevented by family commitments and there being no nursing schools in North Carolina in that period. Wyche graduated from Henderson College in 1889, and taught in the institution's primary department during her studies. After her graduation, she moved to Chapel Hill where she established a residence for her younger brothers who were attending University of North Carolina at Chapel Hill. Wyche also had a part-time job teaching school and kept boarding students. She held a strong belief in education and made small loans to several young students which enabled them to attend college. Wyche moved to Philadelphia, and graduated from Philadelphia General Hospital Training School in 1894 having studied nursing.

=== Career ===
She returned to North Carolina after graduation and moved to Raleigh. Wyche was active in the Rex Hospital Training School for Nurses (which she organized), and was appointed the organization's superintendent of nurses; she also served as Rex Hospital's head nurse, matron and bookkeeper. Four of her first five students graduated in 1897 after two and a half years of training. The following year, she resigned her job to enter Raleigh's private nursing sector. In 1899, Wyche became employed as a nurse State Normal and Industrial College's infirmary, and returned to Raleigh, becoming a private nurse for the year. She was a frequent attendant of professional gatherings in various states. After an International Council of Nurses meeting with other nurses in Buffalo, New York, in the spring of 1901, she returned to Raleigh with the determination to establish a statewide nursing organization, focusing on nursing registration and legislative advocacy to improve nursing and the care of patients. Wyche sent postcards to all of Raleigh's nurses in a two-week period, requesting them to attend a foundation meeting of the Raleigh Nurses Association.

At the meeting on October 10, 1901, none of the invited nurses attended, but Wyche sent a second postcard for a similar meeting held two weeks later. This strategy succeeded and she presented the organization's plans and asked the nurses for their opinions. The result led to the formation of the North Carolina State Nurses Association the following year. Her next objective was to get a law enacted to require the registration of nurses. It was part of Wyche's plan to improve standards which led to the signing of a law on March 3, 1903, by North Carolina state governor Charles Brantley Aycock. It made North Carolina the first state to legalize nurse registration. That same year, she became the superintendent of nurses at Durham's Watts Hospital. Wyche remained in the position for the next ten years. In 1907, she was made the North Carolina State Nurses Association's life honorary president. Wyche served as secretary-treasurer of the first Board of Examiners for Trained Nurses, which she served for six years. She, along with Raleigh-based resident Birdie Dunn, established a home for tubercular nurses in Black Mountain in 1913.

=== Later career and death ===
Wyche was the superintendent of nurses at Henderson's Sarah Elizabeth Hospital, and later returned to private nursing in the state. She led a movement to establish a pre-nursing course at the North Carolina College for Women, and was the leader in seeking to found a nursing school at Duke University. Wyche retired in 1925, and moved into her family home near Henderson. She wrote a book on nursing history called The History of Nursing in North Carolina which was published two years after her death. She died at the family home in Wychewood close to Henderson on the night of August 22, 1936. Her funeral took place in Greensboro the afternoon of the following day. Wyche is considered by many people as the pioneer of organized nursing in North Carolina. She was inducted into the American Nurses Association Hall of Fame in 2002.
