= Mary Lee Mills =

American nurse

- Born: August 1912; Wallace, North Carolina, United States
- Died: February 2, 2010 (aged 97); Burgaw, North Carolina, United States
- Occupation: Nurse
- Years active: 1946–1976
- Awards: Knight Official of the Liberian Humane Order of the Redemption; National Order of the Cedar; Order of the Long Leaf Pine; American Nurses Association Hall of Fame

Mary Lee Mills (August 1912 – February 2, 2010) was an American nurse. Born into a family of eleven children, she attended the Lincoln Hospital School of Nursing and graduated in a nursing degree and became a registered nurse. After working as a midwife, she joined the United States Public Health Service (USPHS) in 1946 and served as their chief nursing officer of Liberia, working to hold some of their first campaigns in public health education. Mills later worked in Lebanon and established the country's first nursing school, and helped to combat treatable diseases. She was later assigned to South Vietnam, Cambodia and Chad to provide medical education.

Mills retired from the USPHS in 1966 and was employed by the United States Department of Health, Education, and Welfare and was made their nursing consultant in the migrant health program. She retired full-time in 1976 but remained active in her local community. She is the recipient of several awards including the National Order of the Cedar, and was inducted into the American Nurses Association Hall of Fame in 2012.

== Biography ==
=== Early life ===
Mills was born in Wallace, North Carolina, in August 1912. She was part of family of eleven children and was the granddaughter of slaves. Mills was raised in nearby Watha. Poor weather conditions in the early 1910s forced many African-American families to migrate to the Northern United States, although Mills' family remained in North Carolina and her father worked as a farm laborer. She planned to study law but later decided to focus on nursing after reading a letter that suggested it would provide an income that would allow her to do what she desired. Mills was educated in segregated one-room schools across the county. She educated other students after her teacher discovered that Mills was a quick learner. She moved to Durham at age 18 to attend Lincoln Hospital School of Nursing. She graduated with a degree in nursing in 1934 and became a registered nurse. Mills continued her education by earning a public health nurse certificate from Medical College of Virginia. She later obtained a midwifery certificate from Lobenstein School of Midwifery, a master's and bachelor's from New York University and graduated from George Washington University with a graduate certificate in health care administration.

=== Career ===
Mills worked as a midwife for several years across the United States. One of her jobs involved driving a woman who was expecting triplets to a hospital one hour away in Durham because other hospitals in Person County rejected them. Mills returned to live in North Carolina in 1946 and became the director of North Carolina College's (now called North Carolina Central University) public health nursing certificate program. The United States Public Health Service offered her a tour of duty in Liberia, and accepted it, despite having previously rejected two previous offers. Mills began her career with the Public Health Service's Office of International Health in February 1946. From 1946 to 1951, she served as the service's chief nursing officer of Liberia. During her period in the position, she organized and established Franklin D. Roosevelt Memorial Children's Ward in the country's primary government hospital, and began immunization stations and health centers. Mills also established the Tubman National School of Nursing, and assisted in the foundation of a national medical library along with holding some of Liberia's first campaigns in public health education.

She traveled back to the United States for rest and study. Mills was promoted from the rank of major to captain and received her next international assignment in Lebanon in January 1952. She represented the United States in the International Council of Nurses and the World Health Organization in various conferences. Mills lived in an Arab household for the first three months of her assignment, and learnt basic Arabic phrases. While in the country's capital Beirut, she worked to establish their first nursing school. Mills also worked at a clinic in Chtoura, where she taught nursing and assisted in the effort to combat treatable diseases which affected the country's rural population. She also worked at Makassed Hospital Nursing School. Mills became the guardian of an eighteen-month old child after she nursed him through an illness. She was awarded a scholarship to further her skill in Arabic at School For International Studies and took her classes in Washington, D.C. Mills later adopted a second child. She later was assigned to South Vietnam, Cambodia and Chad where she provided health education, nursing care, and worked in smallpox and malaria eradication campaigns. Additionally, she taught sanitation, hygiene, nutrition and health education programs and founded maternal-child health clinics.

=== Later career and death ===
Mills retired from the Public Health Service in 1966, and found employment in the United States Department of Health, Education, and Welfare. She was made the department's nursing consultant in their migrant health program, and provided political, policy and program advice on migrant worker health care and other public health issues directly to the Secretary of Health, Education and Welfare, who was a cabinet member who advised the President. Mills traveled to Finland, Germany and Denmark to study their national health care systems and returned ideas that could be used within the United States. She also represented the United States at international conferences relating to nursing, midwifery and public health in Europe, Canada and Australia. Mills retired in 1976 to care for her elderly mother in Wallace, North Carolina. In retirement, she wrote for the Pender Chronicle and Pender Post newspapers. Mills purchased a Washington theater group which raised capital for the Shiloh-Columbia Volunteer Fire Department. During 1983's Black History Month, she helped in identifying and recognizing several black residents over the age of 90. She was profiled by author Mary Elizabeth Carnegie in her 1995 book The Path We Tread: Blacks in Nursing Worldwide. Mills died on February 2, 2010, at Pender Memorial Hospital in Burgaw at the age of 98.

== Awards ==
Mills was the recipient of several national and international awards. She was made a Knight Official of the Liberian Humane Order of the Redemption by the government of Liberia, and was a recipient of the National Order of the Cedar by Lebanon. Mills was awarded the Public Health Service's Distinguished Service Award, and was a recipient of the Order of the Long Leaf Pine in 1987. A nursing dormitory in Lebanon was named was named in her honor. Mills was named as one of six winners of the Rockefeller Public Service Awards in 1971. Her portrait is on display at the Smithsonian Institution. Mills was inducted into the American Nurses Association Hall of Fame in 2012.
