= Mary Sewall Gardner =

American nurse and public health advocate (1871–1961)

Mary Sewall Gardner (February 5, 1871 – February 20, 1961) was an American nurse who is best known for her work in public health. She established the National Organization for Public Health Nursing, now called the National League of Nursing, and wrote the first public health textbook for nurses, Public Health Nursing. For her accomplishments, she was inducted into the American Nurses Association Hall of Fame in 1986.

== Early life and education ==
Mary Sewall Gardner was born on February 5, 1871, in Newton, Massachusetts, the daughter of Mary (Thornton-Davis-Gardner). Gardner had one older brother, Charles Thornton Davis, from her mother's previous marriage to Dr. Davis. She grew up in Providence, Rhode Island. Her mother died when she was four years old.

Her father remarried Sarah Davis, daughter to Judge Isaac Davis. Her father was a judge in Superior Court of Massachusetts and heavily influenced her towards civic responsibility and a logical and rational manner of thinking. Gardner attended Miss Porter's School in Farmington, Connecticut, and graduated in 1890.

After her father's death, the family moved to Providence, Rhode Island where Gardner enrolled in Newport Hospital Training School for Nurses in 1901. She graduated in 1905 at around the age thirty.

== Nursing career ==
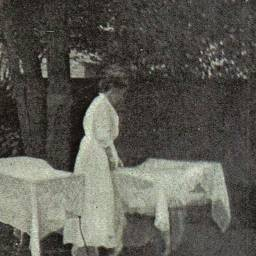
Sick Baby Summer Day Camp, Providence Rhode Island, 1908.

=== Public health ===
Gardner was a nurse administrator at the Providence District Nursing Association (PDNA) for 26 years, first as superintendent and later director. Under her leadership it was one of the most progressive public health organizations for its time. Gardner recognized the work that public health nurses could do to lower the rate of infant mortality and improve the health of children. She advocated to increase staffing for a special nurse positions to care for children, to provide safe milk to families who could not afford to buy it, and to create a registry of milkmen that provide clean milk. Through the efforts of the PDNA the infant mortality rate in Providence dropped from 142 per thousand in 1907 to 102 per thousand in 1917.

In 1916 she published Public Health Nursing.

=== National Organization for Public Health Nursing ===
With nurse activist, Lillian Wald, Gardner organized the National Organization for Public Health Nursing in 1912.

=== World War I ===
In 1918, Gardner took the position of chief nurse of the American Red Cross Tuberculosis Commission for Italy during World War I. She helped to organize public health nursing internationally.

== Later life, recognition, and death ==
Gardner received an honorary master's degree from Brown University, Rhode Island, the Walter Burns Saunders Medal for her distinguished service to nursing, and was inducted into the American Nurses Association Hall of Fame in 1986.

Gardner died in 1961 in Providence, Rhode Island.
