= Lucille Elizabeth Notter =

American nurse (1907–1993)

Lucille Elizabeth Notter (December 13, 1907 – March 4, 1993), also known as Lucille E. Notter was an American nurse and nursing researcher. She directed the National League of Nursing Publications and influenced nurses to conduct research. In 1996, she was inducted into the American Nurses Association Hall of Fame.

== Early life ==
After completing her schooling, Notter was a clerk at an Indiana hospital. She graduated from the Saints Mary and Elizabeth Hospital School of Nursing in Louisville, Kentucky in 1931.

== Career ==
From 1932 to 1940, she worked at the Michael Reese Hospital School of Nursing in Chicago. Between 1941 and 1950, she was a visiting nurse in New York and Brooklyn. Simultaneously, she was pursuing her education at Teachers College, Columbia University, where she obtained a bachelor's degree in nursing education (1941), a master's degree in public health nursing supervision (1946), and a doctorate in educational administration (1956).

She worked for the welfare of nurses. She was the American Nurses Association's research conferences director. She was elected secretary and president of the New York State Nurses Association.

== Publications and editorship ==
She authored Essentials of Nursing Research and co-authored with Eugenia K. Spalding Professional Nursing: Foundations, Perspectives, and Relationships.

She was the editor of Nursing Research and International Nursing Index. She played an important role in the publication of the International Nursing Index and served as its editor from 1965 to 1973.

== Awards and honors ==
For her distinguished services in nursing, she received the Public Health Nursing Award from the American Public Health Association and the R.Louise McManus Medal from the Teachers College Nursing Education Alumni Association. She was also recognized by the New York State Nurses Association.

In 1996, she was inducted into the American Nurses Hall of Fame to recognize her contributions to the nursing field.
