= Visiting nurse association =

American organizations that provide home healthcare and hospice services

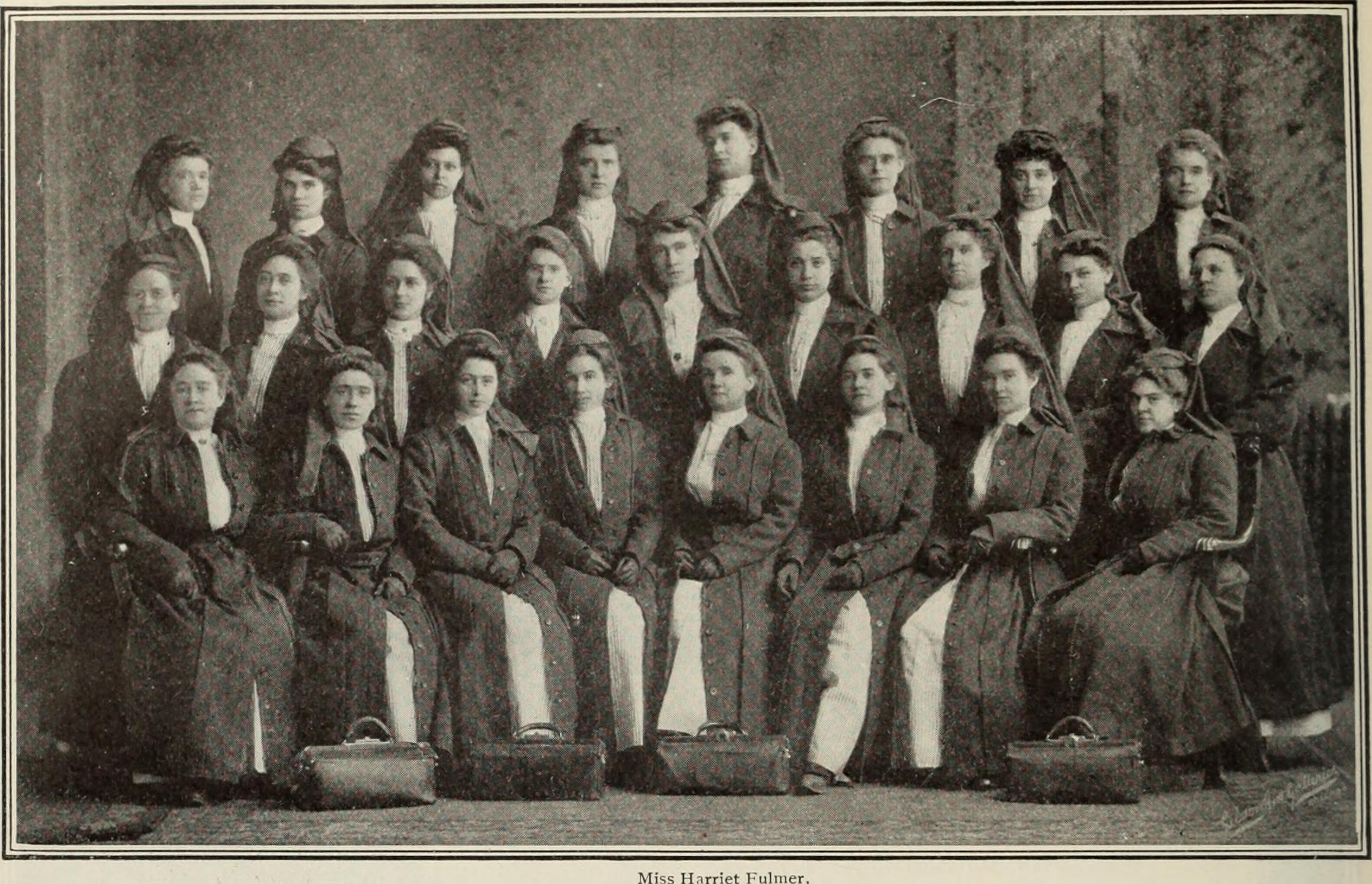
Visiting nurses of Chicago (1906)

A visiting nurse association (VNA), also known as a visiting nurse agency or home healthcare agency or association, is any of various American organizations that provide home healthcare and hospice services through a network of nurses, therapists, social workers, and other healthcare associates for patients who are housebound, recovering from an illness or injury, or are living with a disability or chronic condition.

== History ==
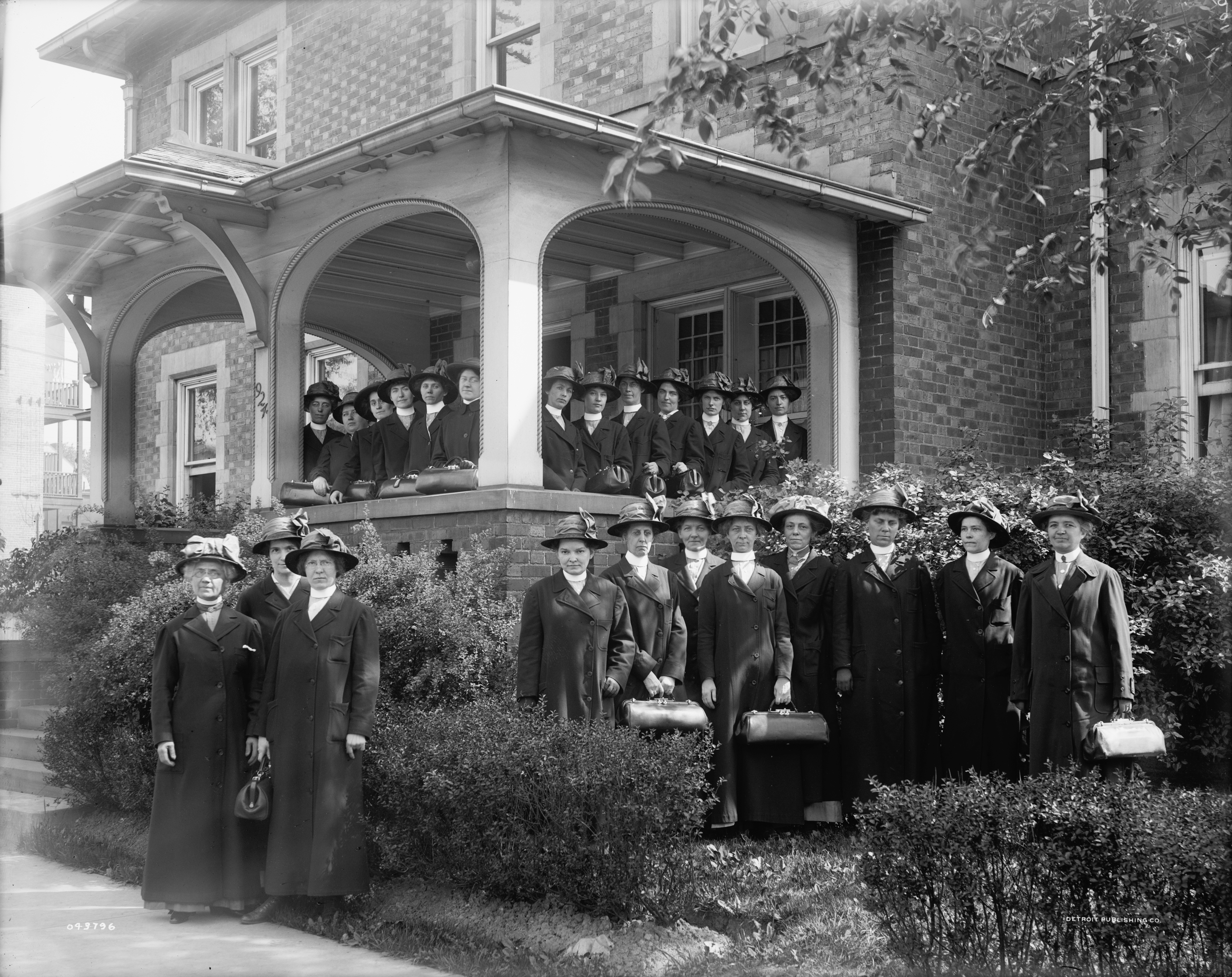
Visiting nurses of Detroit (1914)

In the late 1800s, several district nurse associations began to form in the northeastern United States based on the British district nurse model. Among the first district nurse associations in the United States were the Buffalo District Nursing Association in 1885, The Boston Instructive District Visiting Nurse Association in 1886, Visiting Nurse Association of Philadelphia in 1886, and the Chicago Visiting Nurse Association in 1889.

The current VNA model finds its origins in the Visiting Nurse Service of New York founded by nursing pioneer Lillian D. Wald in 1893 to teach home classes on nursing and healthcare to poor immigrants in New York's Lower East Side. Today there are over 12,000 home health care agencies listed on the Medicare database.

In 2004, the United States Congress recommended the establishment of a Visiting Nurse Association Week reporting that there are over 500 individual VNAs in the United States employing over 90,000 clinicians which provides healthcare to 4,000,000 people annually. In the same report they claimed that VNAs are one of the largest providers of immunizations in the Medicare program with more than 2,500,000 influenza immunizations given manually. The first Visiting Nurse Association Week was celebrated in 2005 in order to increase awareness of the charity-based mission of VNAs and is held annually on the second week in May.
