= Undine Sams =

American nurse (1919–1999)

- Undine Sams c. 1950
- Born: July 21, 1919; Wauchula, Florida, United States
- Died: May 24, 1999 (aged 79); United States
- Education: Barry College
- Occupation: Nurse
- Awards: American Nurses Association Hall of Fame

Undine "Sammy" Sams (July 21, 1919 – May 24, 1999) was an American nurse. She is best known for implementing the integration of the Florida Nurses Association, and received several awards and honors, including induction into the American Nurses Association Hall of Fame in 2000.

== Biography ==
Sams was born on July 21, 1919, in Wauchula, Florida. She was the daughter of Vera Mary Sam and Clarence E. Sams. In 1940, Sams graduated from Jackson Memorial Hospital School of Nursing, and received a Bachelor of Science in Nursing Degree from Barry College (now called Barry University).

She was part of a select group of nurses who were awarded the Army-Navy "E" Award at Naval Air Station Richmond during World War II. Segregation laws were fully enacted in the 1940s, and the Florida Nurses Association (FNA) was one of the first Southern United States nursing association to allow black nurses to join the organization. Sams joined the association in 1949 and assumed the presidency of the FNA.

In the early 1950s, she implemented recommendations for the association's Economic Security Program, and assisted in the creation the Nurses Charitable Trust of FNA District 5 (Miami-Dade County). Sims emphasised to FNA delegates at the association's annual convention in 1966 their responsibilities in the fields of nursing and the need for nursing condition upgrades for other nurses. She was a major contributor in the "Nursing on the Move" campaign, which raised $2 million in support for the American Nurses Association's 1992 relocation from Kansas City, Missouri, to Washington, D.C.

Sams died on May 24, 1999.

== Legacy ==
Sams received several awards and honors for her work. She received an honorary doctorate in public service from Florida International University. Sams was inducted into the Sigma Theta Tau International, Beta Tau Chapter at the University of Miami. The FNA created an award in her name. She was awarded the ANA Special Recognition Award in 1998. Sams was inducted into the American Nurses Association Hall of Fame in 2000.
