= Sara E. Parsons =

American nurse, writer and health administrator (1864 – 1949)

Sara E. Parsons

Sara Elizabeth Parsons (April 21, 1864 – October 25, 1949) was an American nurse, writer and health administrator. She established nurse training schools in hospitals and asylums, and worked for the advancement of psychiatric nursing. She advocated the importance of giving autonomy for nurses, and sought public support for nursing education. She was the president of National League for Nursing Exam in 1916. In 1996, she was inducted into the American Nurses Association Hall of Fame.

== Biography ==
Sara Elizabeth Parsons was born on April 24, 1864, in Northborough, Massachusetts, United States. She completed her early education in the town of Oxford, Massachusetts. In 1884, she enrolled at the Boston Training School for Nurses (now the Massachusetts General Hospital School of Nursing), but shortly returned home to care for her ailing mother. In 1891, after a gap of seven years, she resumed her studies, and graduated in 1893.

After graduation, she began her career at Massachusetts General Hospital School of Nursing, and held different administrative positions, including head nurse, supervisor, and superintendent. She also established a nurse training school in Rhode Island in 1896. Between 1910 and 1920, she was the superintendent of Massachusetts General Hospital, but took a two-year leave in 1917 to serve as chief nurse of American Base Hospital No.6, a MGH-led war hospital in France, and a part in the American Expeditionary Forces, during World War I.

During the Spanish–American War, she volunteered for service on the "Bay State", a hospital ship of Massachusetts Volunteer Aid Association, used to evacuate sick and wounded military personnel from Cuba and Puerto Rico.

She also served as a superintendent of nurses at Adams Nervine Hospital in Massachusetts, a position she held for three years. While serving at Adams Nervine Hospital, she completed a one-year certificate course in hospital economics at Teachers College, Columbia University, and a six-month course in hospital administration at Massachusetts General Hospital of Nursing.

As a superintendent of Massachusetts General Hospital, she took several initiatives and introduced number of reforms including extra-curricular activities, probationary period, higher admission requirements, an endowment fund for the nursing school, and a school library. During her tenure as president of the Massachusetts Nurses Association, she supported the licensure and registration for nurses. She also actively worked for full military rank for army nurses. She later presented her position in hearings conducted by the United States Senate.

After her retirement in 1926, she traveled extensively. She died on October 25, 1949.

In recognizing her contributions in the field of nursing, in 1996, she was inducted into the American Nurses Association Hall of Fame.

== Publications ==
She contributed many articles for nursing journals. Her important books include

- Nursing Problems and Obligations (1916) and
- The History of the Massachusetts General Hospital Training School for Nurses (1922).
