= American Association for the History of Nursing =

The American Association for the History of Nursing (AAHN) is a non-profit organization dedicated to promoting the history of nursing. The organization uses history to achieve adequate recognition for professional nurses and the pioneers of nursing, and shaping values and beliefs in nursing in the context of history. The association sponsors an annual autumn conference on nursing history and publishes the annual Nursing History Review. The American Association for the History of Nursing provides important historical resources for helping nurses understand the importance of their profession.

== Goals and leadership ==
The AAHN has several goals, including promoting interest in, and collaboration on, the history of nursing; educating nurses and the general public about the historical heritage of the nursing profession; encouraging research in the history of nursing; preserving and making accessible historical materials relevant to nursing; and promoting nursing curricula with adequate coverage of the history of nursing. There are about 25 people serving in the AAHN as executives or members of the board of directors. The president of the AAHN serves a two-year term.

== History ==
A group of nurse historians founded, in the early 1980s, the International History of Nursing Society with the purpose of promoting the history of nursing and collaborating on research in the history of nursing. The society was based in Illinois and the society's members soon decided that an international emphasis was premature, so the society's name was changed to the American Association for the History of Nursing (AAHN). The AAHN's annual conferences were begun in 1984. The society's first president (from 1979 to 1980) was Teresa E. Christy (1927–1982).

History might be an essential component of medical knowledge, and this include the history of nursing as promoted by the AAHN. According to Susan Mokotoff Reverby, the history of nursing emerged in the 1970s as an active area of scholarship, and the AAHN played an important role in this emergence.

== Research awards ==
The AAHN annually presents, at its autumn conference, four awards for completed research in the history of nursing:

1. The Teresa E. Christy Award is for outstanding historical research and writing done by a doctoral student.
2. The Lavinia L. Dock Award is for a book noteworthy for excellence in research and writing.
3. The Mary Adelaide Nutting Award acknowledges the author of a post-doctoral article in the history of nursing.
4. The Mary M. Roberts Award is for a noteworthy, edited book on the history of nursing.

Eligibility for the awards is restricted to AHN members. Submissions for awards should specify which award the AAHN member is applying for.
