= Dorothy E. Reilly =

American nurse (1920 –1996)

Dorothy E. Reilly (February 6, 1920 – April 7, 1996) was an American nurse who was “one of leading nursing educators at the time”. She played an instrumental role in the development of nursing education in the United States and Canada. She was involved in developing the nursing curriculum and preparation of nursing teachers. In 1998, she was inducted into American Nurses Association Hall of Fame.

== Biography ==
Dorothy E. Reilly was born on February 6, 1920, in Holyoke, Massachusetts, United States, to James A. and Mary E. Kincaide Reilly. In 1937, she started her nursing education at Mount Holyoke College and received her diploma in 1939. She continued her higher education at the Columbia University-Presbyterian Hospital School of Nursing, graduating with a Bachelor of Science in 1942. After working several years as head nurse for the Institute of Ophthalmology and at Presbyterian Hospital in New York City, she began her teaching career as an instructor at the Holyoke Hospital School of Nursing in her home town.

In 1948, she enrolled for an MA in nursing at Boston University, School of Nursing. After graduating in 1950, she joined the faculty of Columbia University School of Nursing, where she was involved in curriculum development and planning for undergraduate programs in nursing. She also received several federal funding for health to implement BSN and MSN programs in the areas of Michigan, where educational institutions lacked resources to offer nursing courses. In 1958, she became an associate professor.

Meanwhile, in 1967, she completed her doctorate in higher education from New York University. She then moved to Wayne State University College of Nursing in 1969 and became a full professor in 1973. After her retirement from Wayne State University in 1987, she became a visiting professor of nursing at Curtin University in Perth, Australia. She also volunteered in getting grants for clinics in Detroit and scholarships for college students.

Throughout her career, she widely wrote on nursing education. In 1955, she published her first book, Quick Reference Book for Nurses. Her other books include Behavioral Objectives in Nursing: Evaluation of Learner Attainment (1976) and Clinical Teaching in Nursing Education (1992). She also served as a consultant of nursing education.

In 1977, she was elected to the Academy of Nursing and received the distinguished alum award of the Columbia University School of Nursing in 1983. She was a member of the Michigan Nurses Association.

To recognize her contributions in the nursing field, she was inducted into American Nurses Association Hall of Fame in 1998.

She died on April 7, 1996.
