= Veronica Driscoll =

American nurse and labor organizer

- Born: Veronica Margaret Driscoll; 24 April 1926; Brooklyn, New York City, United States
- Died: 30 January 1994 (aged 69); Loudonville, New York, United States
- Education: Midwood High School; St John's University; New York University; Teachers College, Columbia University
- Occupations: Labor organizer Nurse
- Years active: 1948–1979
- Awards: American Nurses Association Hall of Fame

Veronica Margaret Driscoll (April 24, 1926 – January 30, 1994) was an American nurse and labor organizer. She worked with the New York State Nurses Association where she brought about collective bargaining for nurses in the state. Driscoll was awarded with four honors, which include induction into the American Nurses Association Hall of Fame in 2002.

== Biography ==
=== Early life ===
Driscoll was born on April 24, 1926, in Brooklyn. She was one of seven children born to Francis Aloysius Bartholomew and Madeline (née Daly) Driscoll. In her childhood years, Driscoll went to a catholic school, and later attended P.S. 207. She went to Midwood High School, where she won first prize in a short story contest. Driscoll's first choice for her career was in journalism, but experiences with illness in her family influenced her to go into nursing. After she graduated from St. Catherine's Hospital School of Nursing in 1948, Driscoll earned a Bachelor of Science degree from St John's University five years later. She earned a master's degree in guidance and personnel administration from New York University in 1958, and later went to Teachers College, Columbia University where she graduated with a Doctor of Education degree.

=== Career ===
Driscoll accepted a job as a general duty staff nurse at St Catharine's Hospital in 1948. She was appointed as the hospital's supervisor of their student health program two years later. In 1953, Driscoll joined the school's nursing department as an instructor. She applied for a job in the New York States Nursing Association's counseling and placement service in 1960. However, Driscoll was offered the position of assistant director in the organization's economic security program, which she accepted. She was named their associate director three years later, a job which she held until 1969. Driscoll led negotiations for nurses employed by the city's 21 municipal hospitals of New York City Department of Hospitals in 1966. She stated that locating nurses was difficult due to poor wages and working conditions. A precedent contract was signed after eight months of negotiation which increased nurses' salaries by 20%, and improved working conditions and gave them more benefits. Driscoll's leadership prevented thousands of nurses from resigning en masse.

She staffed a committed that prepared a report entitled A Blueprint for the Education of Nurses in New York which was published in 1966. Driscoll was appointed the New York State Nurses Association's executive director in the summer of 1969. While in the position, the organization's membership doubled which meant it became the largest registered nurses' bargaining agent in the United States. She was a significant factor in enacting the 1972 revision of the state's nurse practice act. Driscoll implemented several large organizational changes within the New York States Nursing Association. She oversaw the start of the organization's journal, the Report and Journal, and the introduction of the position of president-elect. Driscoll served as chair on the American Nurses Association (ANA) Commission on Economics and General Welfare, due to her being a member of the ANA's board of directors, and served as secretary of the board of directors of the American Journal of Nursing company, and was a member of the New York State Hospital Review and Planning Council.

=== Later life and death ===
Driscoll retired in 1979 but remained active as a secretary of the foundation of the organization, and was given a large amount of invitations to present papers and workshops on a wide variety of topics. She died on January 30, 1994, at her home in Loudonville, New York, after suffering from cancer. Driscoll is buried in St. Agnes Cemetery in Menands.

== Honors ==
Driscoll was awarded several honors. She was a recipient of the ANA Honorary Recognition Award, the New York States Nurses Association Honorary Recognition Award, and was conferred with the Teachers College Nursing Education Alumni Association Achievement Award. She was inducted into the American Nurses Association Hall of Fame in 2002.
