= Mary E. P. Davis =

American nursing instructor (1840–1924)

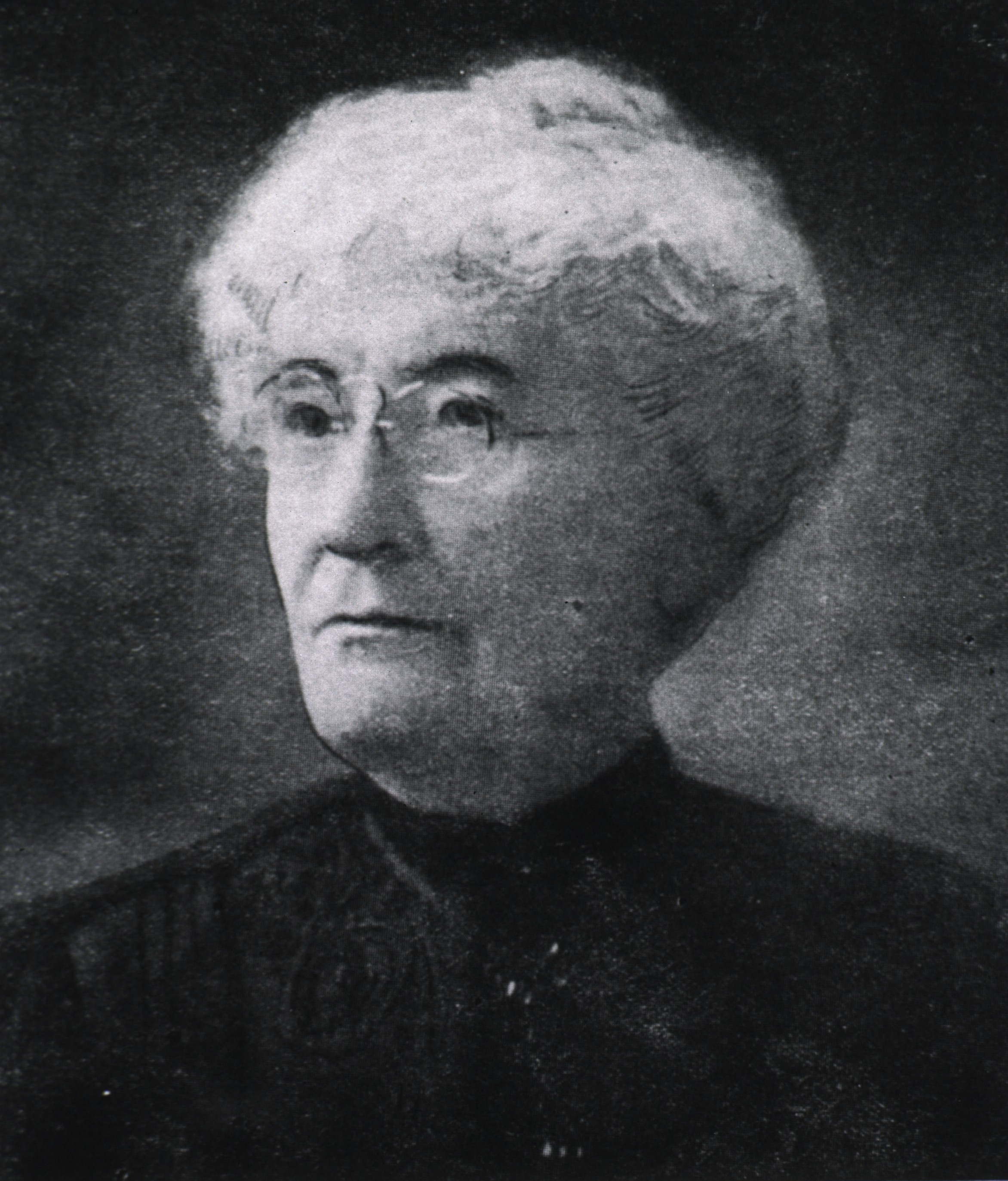
- Born: 1840; New Brunswick, British North America
- Died: June 9, 1924 (aged 83–84); Norwood, Massachusetts

Mary E. P. Davis (1840–1924) was a Canadian-born American nursing instructor and a founder of the American Journal of Nursing (AJN).

== Biography ==
Davis, along with Sophia French Palmer, created the AJN in 1899, with the first issue going out in October 1900. In order to create the journal, Davis reached out to 5,000 different people to subscribe and eventually started with 550 paid subscriptions. She also raised money for the journal and covered the mailing costs herself. She served as the AJN's business manager from 1900 to 1909.

Palmer and Davis also helped create the American Nursing Association. Davis was one of the founders of the American Society of Superintendents of Training Schools for Nurses which later became the National League for Nursing. She also served as the president of the Massachusetts State Nurses' Association.

In 1890, as Superintendent at the Training School for Nurses at the Hospital of the University of Pennsylvania, Davis extended the course from two to three years. The change remained effective until the school closed in 1878. Davis was appointed Superintendent of Nurses at the Boston Hospital for the Insane in 1901. Davis was a graduate of the Massachusetts General Hospital Training School, and a former student of Linda Richards. Her last position before she officially retired was as the Corresponding Secretary of the Massachusetts State Nurses' Association.

The Palmer-Davis Nursing Library at Massachusetts General Hospital was named after Palmer and Davis. The library was merged administratively with Treadwell Library in 1981 when the diploma school of nursing closed.

In 1982, she was inducted into the American Nurses Association Hall of Fame.
