= Alma Elizabeth Gault =

American nurse administrator

Alma Elizabeth Gault (September 28, 1891 – July 12, 1981) was an American nurse administrator. Gault successfully advocated for African American nurses and their educational institutions to be integrated into professional nursing associations. Under her leadership, Meharry Medical College School of Nursing, in Nashville, Tennessee, was the first segregated black nursing school to attain membership in the American Association of Collegiate Schools of Nursing. For her achievement's Gault was inducted into the American Nurses Association Hall of Fame in 1984.

== Early life and education ==
Alma Elizabeth Gault was born in Fernwood, Ohio on September 28, 1891, to Dorison and Nancy (Stark) Gault. She graduated from Wells High School in Steubenville, Ohio in 1910. Gault was awarded a Ph.D. from Wooster University in Wooster, Ohio in 1916 She attended a Vassar College training camp in 1918. Gault graduated from the Philadelphia General Hospital School of Nursing in 1920.

== Nursing career ==
Gault was the head nurse at Philadelphia General Hospital School of Nursing. Her writings about her experience is one of earliest articles on clinical nursing.

From 1922 through 1925, Gault worked at Ohio State Department of Health in a Tuberculosis Clinic. She worked as Pediatric Clinic nurse at Johns Hopkins Hospital from 1926 to 1927. For ten years, 1927–1937, Gault worked at Cooke County School of Nursing in Chicago as the associate director and instructor in public health nursing. Beginning in 1938, Gault was the Director of Union Memorial Hospital School of Nursing in Baltimore, Maryland. She left Union Memorial to take the position of Director of Nursing Services at Memorial Hospital in Springfield, Illinois in 1943.

In 1944, Gault accepted the position of dean at Meharry Medical College School of Nursing, a black school in Nashville, Tennessee. Gault developed a diploma program at Meharry that received accreditation, and later added an accredited baccalaureate program. Under her leadership, Meharry was the first segregated black nursing school to attain membership in the American Association of Collegiate Schools of Nursing.

In 1953, Gault became associate professor School of Nursing at Vanderbilt University, Nashville. She was acting dean of the school from 1958 to 1959, and dean from 1965 to 1967. During Gault's tenor as dean, Bobbie Jean Perdue, the first African-American student, enrolled in the school. Other accomplishments at the school include securing a donation from the Helene Fuld Trust Fund to renovate the nursing building and to establish the Helene Fuld Instructional Media Center. Gault helped secure a grant from the Division of Nursing of the U.S. Public Health Service to trial a five-year undergraduate curriculum revision project with the intention to enrich the curriculum to better recruit and retain students.

== Recognition ==
Nashville proclaimed Alma Gault Day in recognition of her achievements when Gault retired. Gault was inducted into the American Nurses Association Hall of Fame in 1984. The Tennessee Nurses Association annually recognizes one nurse with the Alma E. Gault Leadership Award.

== Later life and death ==
She died July 12, 1981, in Ohio.
