= Imogene King =

American nurse and nursing theorist (1923–2007)

- Born: January 30, 1923; West Point, Iowa
- Died: December 24, 2007 (aged 84); St. Petersburg, Florida
- Education: St. John's Hospital School of Nursing; St. Louis University; Teachers College, Columbia University
- Known for: Nursing theory
- Scientific career
- Fields: Nursing

Imogene King (January 30, 1923 – December 24, 2007) was a pioneer of nursing theory development. Her interacting systems theory of nursing and her theory of goal attainment have been included in every major nursing theory text. These theories are taught to thousands of nursing students, form the basis of nursing education programs, and are implemented in a variety of service settings.

== Biography ==
Imogene Eva Martina King was born on January 30, 1923, in West Point, Iowa, the youngest of three children. King originally wanted to be a teacher, but her uncle, a doctor, offered her the opportunity to study nursing. To escape small-town life, she accepted.

=== Education ===
King's educational achievements began with a nursing diploma in 1945 when she graduated from St. John's Hospital School of Nursing in St. Louis, Missouri. She then studied nursing education at St. Louis University, graduating with a bachelor's degree in 1948. From 1947 to 1958 she worked at St. John's Hospital School of Nursing as a nursing teacher and assistant director. In 1957 she received her master's degree in nursing from St. Louis University and earned her doctorate in education (EdD) from Columbia University Teachers College in New York City.

=== Academic appointments ===
King then became an assistant professor at Loyola University Chicago, also studying statistics, research and computer science. While at Loyola, she developed a master's program based on her theory that later formed the framework for her model of care. She published her first theoretical approach in 1964 in the Journal of Nursing Science. From 1966 to 1968, King worked for the United States Department of Health, Education and Welfare before moving to Ohio State University in Columbus, Ohio, as the principal of the nursing school. There, King published Toward a Theory of Nursing: General Concepts of Human Behavior in 1971, dated 1973, and winning the American Journal of Nursing Book of the Year award.

From 1971 to 1980, King returned to Loyola University as a professor, and in 1980 transferred to South Florida's College of Nursing in Tampa, Florida as a professor emeritus and taught there until 1990.

In 1981 King published her text, A Theory for Nursing: Systems, Concepts, Process, in which King presents her complete theory.

=== Personal life ===
She remained in Tampa until her retirement in 1990.

King died of a stroke on December 24, 2007, in St. Petersburg, Florida. Her burial was held in Fort Madison, Iowa on January 19, 2008.

== Awards and honors ==
- 2005: Living Legend, American Academy of Nursing
- 2004: Hall of Fame Inductee, American Nurses Association
- Honorary Doctorate from Southern Illinois University
- 1996: Jessie M. Scott Award of the American Nurses Association
- 1973: Book of the Year award, American Journal of Nursing

== Selected publications ==
- King, Imogene (1981). A Theory for Nursing: Systems, Concepts, Process. J. Wiley. ISBN 978-0471077954.
- King, I. M. (1990). Health as the goal for nursing. Nursing Science Quarterly, 3(3), 123-128.
- King, I. M. (1992). King's theory of goal attainment. Nursing Science Quarterly, 5(1), 19-26.
- King, I. M. (1994). Quality of life and goal attainment. Nursing Science Quarterly, 7(1), 29-32.
- King, I. M. (1997). King's theory of goal attainment in practice. Nursing Science Quarterly, 10(4), 180-185.
- King, I. M. (1999). A theory of goal attainment: Philosophical and ethical implications. Nursing Science Quarterly, 12(4), 292-296.
- King, I. M. (2007). King's conceptual system, theory of goal attainment, and transaction process in the 21st century. Nursing Science Quarterly, 20(2), 109-111.

== See also ==
- List of Living Legends of the American Academy of Nursing
