= Sophia French Palmer =

American nurse, editor and health administrator

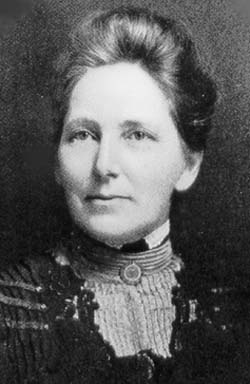
- Born: May 26, 1853; Milton, Massachusetts
- Died: April 27, 1920; Forest Lawn, New York
- Occupation(s): Nurse, editor and health administrator
- Known for: American Nurses Association Hall of Fame

Sophia French Palmer (May 26, 1853 – April 27, 1920) was an American nurse, an editor and a health administrator. She was the first Editor-in-chief of the American Journal of Nursing. She was the President of the New York State Board of Nurse Examiners. She was also associated with the American Nurses Association, and various American Training Schools for Nurses including the Garfield Memorial Hospital. She made significant contributions in establishing a number of health institutions particularly in the field of nurse training.

== Biography ==
Born on May 26, 1853, in Milton, Massachusetts, Sophia French Palmer was the daughter of physician Simeon Palmer and Maria Spencer Palmer. In 1876 she graduated from the Boston Training School for Nurses (now called as the Massachusetts General Hospital School of Nursing). She later moved to Philadelphia, where she worked with Dr. Weir Mitchell as a private nurse, and specialized in nervous and mental illnesses.

In 1884 she became the superintendent of the newly established St. Luke's Hospital in New Bedford, Massachusetts, where she laid the foundation for making it a training school for nurses. However she resigned a year after following the reduction of the number of nurses due to “hard economic times”. Meanwhile, she started pursuing graduate study at the Massachusetts General Hospital.

She played an important role in establishing different health institutions including the New York State Nurses Association. In 1889 she moved to Washington, D.C., where she established the training school for nurses at the Garfield Memorial Hospital, and became its administrator. In 1893 she founded the American Society of Superintendents of Training Schools for Nurses, and drafted its constitution.

During 1896 – 1900, she served as the superintendent of the Rochester City Hospital and Training school in New York. In 1900 she started the American Journal of Nursing, under the American Nurses Association and became its first editor-in-chief, the position that she held until her sudden death when the post was assumed by Katharine DeWitt. In her editorials, she highlighted a number of professional and social issues.

In recognizing her outstanding contributions in the field of nursing, in 1976, she was inducted into the “American Nurses Association Hall of Fame”.

She never married. She died in Forest Lawn, New York on April 27, 1920.
