= Mary May Roberts =

American nurse and journal editor

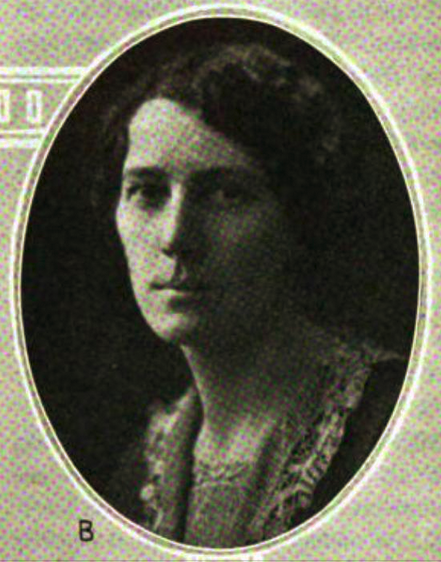
- American Journal of Nursing, 1925
- Born: January 31, 1877; Cheboygan, Michigan
- Died: January 11, 1959 (aged 81); New York City
- Burial place: Pine Hill Cemetery, Cheboygan, Michigan
- Education: Teachers College, Columbia University
- Occupations: Nurse and journal editor

Mary May Roberts (1877–1959) was an American nurse and long-time editor of the American Journal of Nursing. She was a chief nurse and director at the Army School of Nursing, Camp Sherman, during World War I and was inducted into the American Nurses Association Hall of Fame in 1984.

== Life and work ==
Roberts was born on January 31, 1877, in Cheboygan, Michigan, to Henry West Roberts and Elizabeth Scott Elliot.

=== Nurse ===
She acquired the title Registered Nurse, at the Jewish Hospital School of Nursing in Cincinnati, 1899. She went on to earn her Bachelor of Science, at Columbia University's Teacher College, in New York City, 1921.

She was superintendent of nurses at the Savannah (Georgia) Hospital (now Warren A. Chandler Hospital in Atlanta), 1900-1902 and became assistant superintendent of the Jewish Hospital, Cincinnati, 1902–1904. She was superintendent at C. R. Holmes Hospital in Cincinnati, 1908–1917.

During World War I, she was director of nursing service, Lake Division, for the American Red Cross, Cleveland, 1917–1918, and then was chief nurse and director of Army School of Nursing, Camp Sherman, in Ohio, 1918–1919.

=== Editor ===
For 28 years, Roberts was editor of the American Journal of Nursing founded by Mary E. P. Davis. When she was named co-editor in 1921 with Katharine DeWitt, Roberts already had 22 years of nursing experience. In 1923, she assumed the role of sole editor, and she held that post for more than a quarter century and later made additional contributions as editor emeritus. According to the American Nurses Association, "During her editorship, the circulation increased from 20,000 to more than 100,000."

Roberts was inducted into the American Nurses Association Hall of Fame in 1984.

=== Personal life ===
Roberts died January 11, 1959, at 81, while writing an editorial in the New York City offices of the Journal. She was buried in Section P of Pine Hill Cemetery, Cheboygan, Michigan.

== Memberships ==
- American Nurses Association
- National League for Nursing

== Distinctions ==
- Bronze medal of Ministry of Social Welfare of France, July 1933
- Certificate of Appreciation from U.S. Department of Army
- Florence Nightingale Medal (1949)

== Selected publications ==
- Roberts, M. M. (1954). American nursing: history and interpretation. Macmillan Company.
- Roberts, M. M. (1955). The army nurse corps yesterday and today. United States Army Nurse Corps.
