= Barbara Thoman Curtis =

American nurse and activist (1938–2015)

- Born: October 17, 1938; Chicago, Illinois, United States
- Died: October 18, 2015 (aged 77); Ormond Beach, Florida, United States
- Occupations: Activist; Nurse
- Spouse: Richard Curtis
- Children: 3
- Awards: American Nurses Association Hall of Fame

Barbara Thoman Curtis, RN (Oct. 17, 1938 – Oct. 18, 2015) was an American nurse and activist. She received several awards for her work in nursing and healthcare, including induction into the American Nurses Association Hall of Fame in 2014.

== Early life and education ==
Curtis was born on Oct. 17, 1938 in Chicago. She had Greek ancestry and was the daughter of John and Sue Thoman, who raised her in Independence, Missouri. Curtis moved to various places throughout her life, including Spokane, Washington; Wheaton, Illinois; and Bethesda, Maryland. As a teenager, she attended William Chrisman High School, from which she graduated in 1956. Though she was interested in becoming an attorney, the lack of female attorneys during this time kept Curtis from pursuing this profession. However, she did become involved in political activism. She attended the Independence Sanitarium and Hospital School of Nursing (now called Graceland University), where she earned her degree as a registered nurse. While in attendance, Curtis served as her school's president of the Missouri State Student Nurses Association.

== Career ==
After graduating from Graceland University, Curtis relocated to Washington State, where she taught two diploma nursing programs and was the first nurse and youngest person to become President of the Washington State Nurses Association in 1970. Curtis influenced the development of the first political action committee for nurses in Washington, known as Politically United Nurses for Consumer Health (now called WSNA-PAC). She stated that it was the best achievement of her career. Curtis also worked at Spokane's St. Luke's Hospital as an emergency room nurse. The American Nurses Association (ANA) invited her to establish the organization's first political action committee in 1973. The committee, the Nurses Coalition for Action in Politics (N-CAP), was established the following year and Curtis became its first elected chairperson. While in Washington, she helped over 20 states establish their own political action committees and served as a lobbyist in addition to being a consultant and volunteer in several political races at the local and state level.

Curtis returned to Illinois in 1976 and became active in her local community and the State Nurses Association. She was an early pioneer of the Nurse Lobby Days, which began after a meeting with four of her colleagues and Illinois' chief lobbyist. After publicly voicing an issue concerning the state of Illinois' welfare system in 1983, she was arrested. However, the charges were dropped at the end of that year's local elections. In 1988, Curtis moved back to Missouri, where she served on Congressman Alan Wheat's Advisory Committee on Health Care. She was elected as a precinct committee person, represented at the state party convention and selected as an alternate delegate to the Democratic National Convention. Curtis and her daughter participated in a sponsored event, where she drove an old ambulance in a caravan from North Carolina to Washington, D.C., on a health care reform rally that occurred across the United States.

The ANA chose Curtis as one of two people to spend three months in Washington, D.C., as a White House liaison on health care legislation. Curtis was the chief coordinator and a member of the White House's advance team for a health care rally. In retirement, she served as co-pastor of the Community of Christ congregation in Ormond Beach, Florida, and held services at her residence.

== Personal ==
She was married to Richard Curtis; they had three children. She died October 18, 2015, in her home in Ormond Beach.

== Legacy ==
Curtis received several honors and awards for her work in nursing and healthcare. She was awarded the Honorary Recognition Award by the Washington State Nurses Association in 1974. Ten years later, the American Nurses Foundation awarded the first Barbara Curtis Scholarship. The honor is awarded to a nurse who makes significant contributions to nursing practice and health policy through legislative and political activity. She was inducted into the American Nurses Association Hall of Fame in 2014.
