= Cornell School of Nursing =

Nursing school in New York City

Coordinates: 40.765792°N 73.954299°W

The Cornell School of Nursing was an American nursing school in New York City, New York. It was founded in 1877 as the New York Hospital Training School for Nurses and was affiliated with New York Hospital. In 1932, the training school moved to a joint campus with Cornell University's Medical College. In 1942, the two institutions merged to form Cornell University-New York Hospital School of Nursing, an institution that was independent of Cornell University. The school closed in 1979.

== History ==
The Cornell School of Nursing was founded in 1877 as the New York Hospital Training School for Nurses in New York City, New York. It was part of New York Hospital. Through the New York Hospital, the nursing school began a connection with Cornell University when Cornell's Medical College affiliated with New York Hospital in 1927. In 1932, the nursing school moved to a joint campus on the upper east side of New York when both institutions co-located.

The nursing school became a unit of Cornell University in 1942 and was renamed as the Cornell University-New York Hospital School of Nursing. The school remained financially independent of the university, however, with Cornell providing only the salary of the dean. The rest of its funding came from state and federal sources, tuition, and the daily charges billed to patients staying at New York Hospital.

In the mid-1970s, insurance companies started to refuse to reimburse nursing education expenses as a part of hospital charges, and federal funding also declined. A 1970 university planning review had furthermore concluded that there were enough undergraduate nursing programs available through the City University of New York and State University of New York to serve the city. Consequently, the university closed the School of Nursing, and its last class graduated in 1979.

The historical records of the School of Nursing are housed at the Medical Center Archives of Weill Cornell Medicine.

== Academics ==
The school awarded a Bachelor of Nursing degree after five years of study, two in an undergraduate college and three at the Medical Center. It was one of the few institutions that offered an undergraduate nursing program geared especially for those who already had a bachelor's degree in another field.

== Notable alumni ==
- Annie Warburton Goodrich, first dean of the United States Army School of Nursing and dean of the Yale School of Nursing
- Julia Catherine Stimson, chief nurse, Red Cross Nursing Service in France during World War I
- Lillian Wald, founder, Visiting Nurse Service
- Alma S. Woolley, dean and professor emeritus, Georgetown University School of Nursing and Health Studies
