= William Valentine Schevill =

American painter

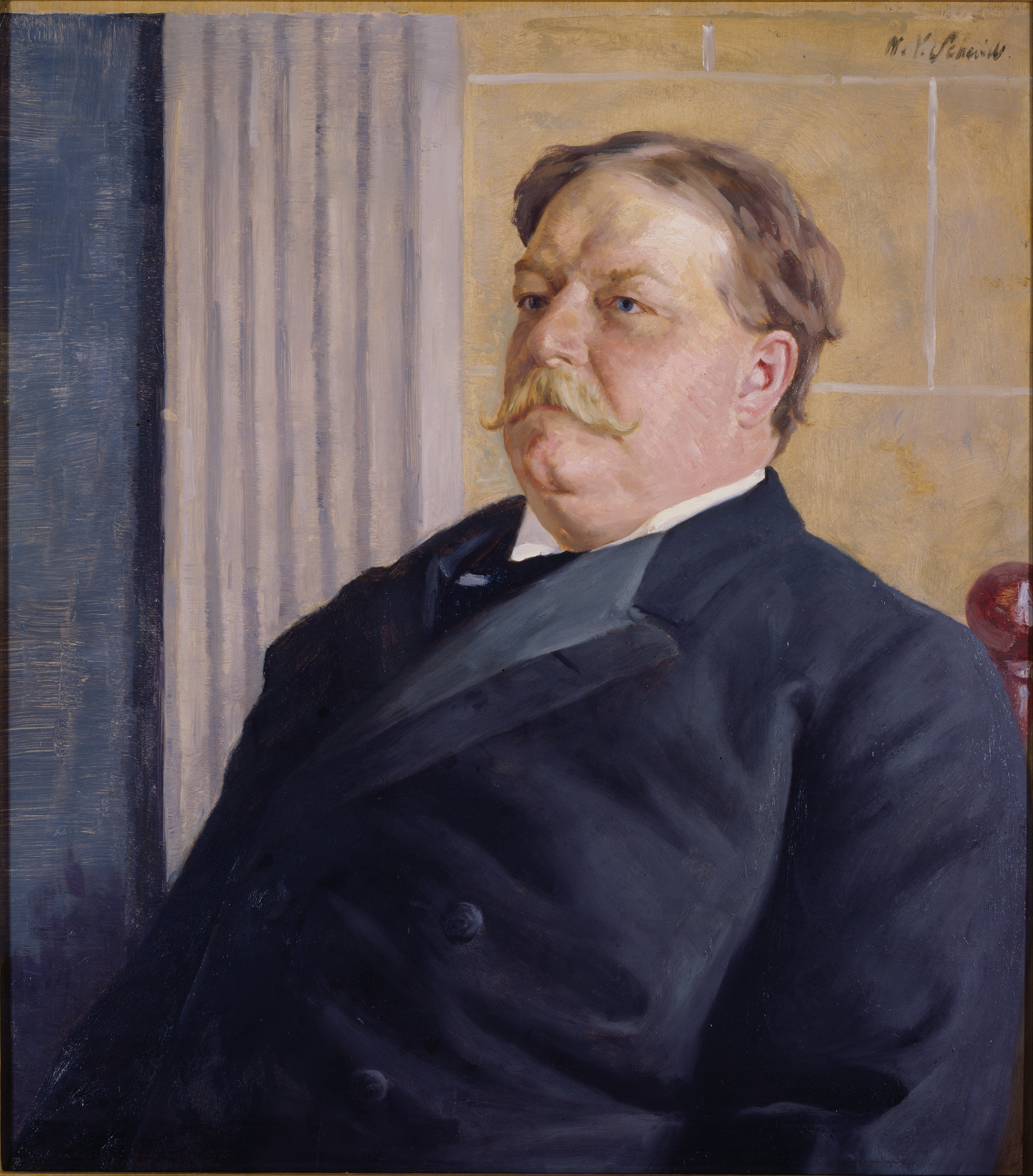
William Valentine Schevill

William Valentine Schevill (March 2, 1864 in Cincinnati – 1951) was an American artist.

== Life ==
He studied at the Cincinnati Art Academy with Frank Duveneck, and at Academy of Fine Arts Munich with Ludwig Löfftz, Max Lindenschmitt, and Nikolaos Gyzis. He lived in Los Angeles in the 1940s, and was active in New York City and Boston. He was a member of the Salmagundi Club. He showed at the Louisiana Purchase Exposition. His work is at the Herron School of Art and Design, and National Portrait Gallery.
