= Lavinia Dock =

American nurse, feminist, writer and social activist

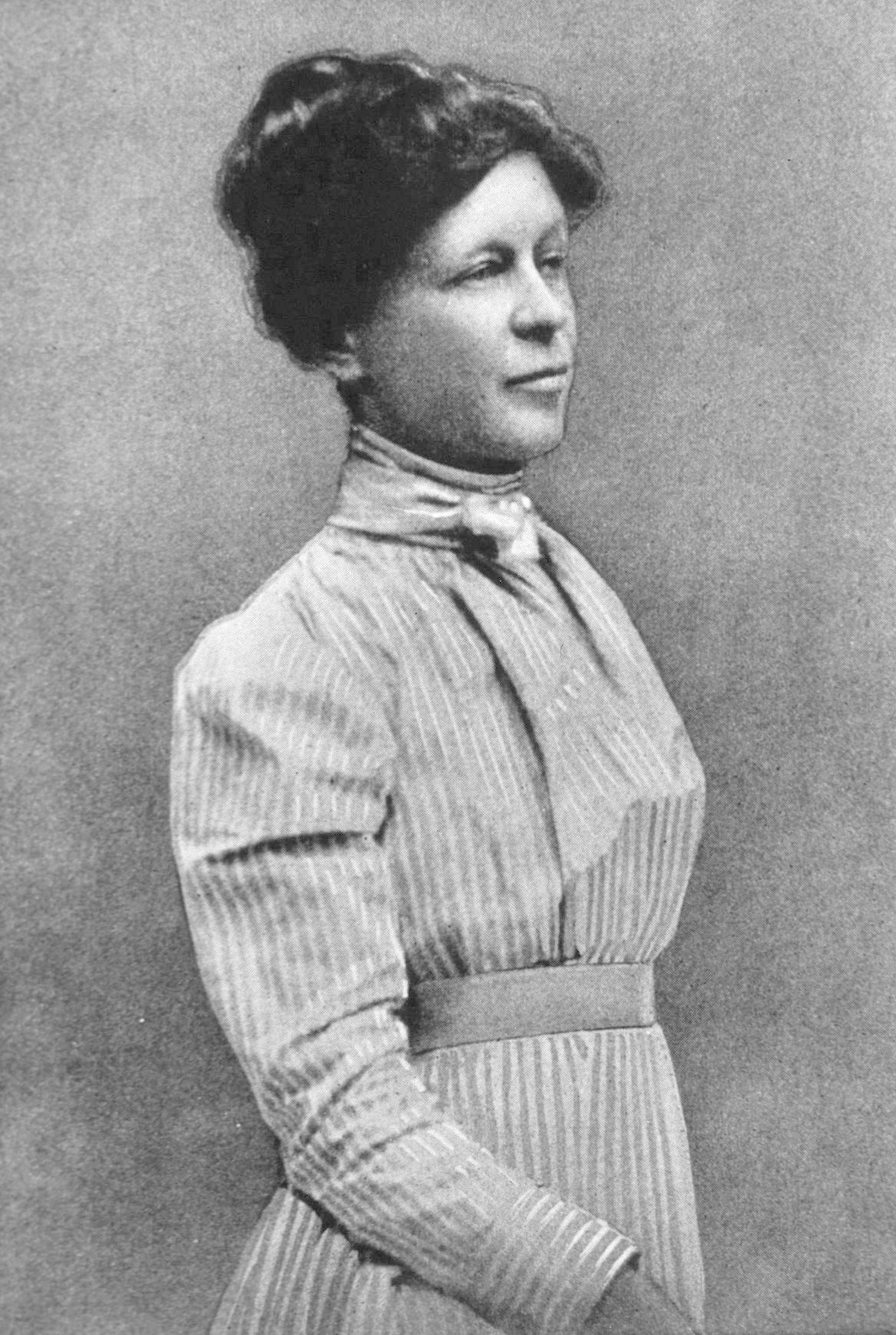
- Born: February 26, 1858; Harrisburg, Pennsylvania
- Died: April 17, 1956 (aged 98); Chambersburg, Pennsylvania
- Education: Bellevue Hospital School of Nursing
- Occupations: Nurse, Educator, Author

Lavinia Lloyd Dock (February 26, 1858 – April 17, 1956) was an American nurse, feminist, writer, pioneer in nursing education and social activist. Dock was an assistant superintendent at Johns Hopkins School of Nursing under Isabel Hampton Robb. She founded what would become the National League for Nursing with Robb and Mary Adelaide Nutting. Dock was a contributing editor to the American Journal of Nursing and authored several books, including a four-volume history of nursing (with M. Adelaide Nutting as co-author) and Materia Medica for Nurses, the nurse's standard manual of drugs for many years. In her later life, she also campaigned for social reform, particularly women's rights.

== Early life ==
Lavinia Dock was born one of six children in Harrisburg, Pennsylvania on February 26, 1858. Dock's mother died when she was eighteen. She and her siblings were financially independent due to an income from a land that their parents inherited, which allowed her greater choice in her career path.

In 1884, Dock enrolled at the Bellevue Hospital School of Nursing in New York and graduated in 1886, working there afterwards as a night supervisor.

== Nursing career ==
In 1888, Dock worked with Jane Delano, a young nurse who later founded the American Red Cross Nursing Service, at a Florida hospital during a yellow fever outbreak. Dock also worked with Clara Barton in the spring of 1889 helping victims of a flood in Johnstown, Pennsylvania.

Previously at Bellevue, Dock herself experienced the problems nursing students faced when studying drugs. In 1890, financed by her father, she authored the first nurses' drug manual, Materia Medica for Nurses. It became a standard nursing school text and sold over one hundred thousand copies.

In 1890, Dock was appointed to Johns Hopkins School of Nursing as the assistant superintendent under Isabel Hampton Robb, with whom she remained lifelong friends. Dock took on the responsibilities of first-year and ward teaching.

In 1893, Dock founded, with the assistance of Robb and Mary Adelaide Nutting (the latter her student at Hopkins), and became the secretary of the American Society of Superintendents of Training Schools for Nurses of the United States and Canada, which became the National League for Nursing. That year she also formed the Nurses' Associated Alumnae, now the American Nurses Association.

When Dock left Hopkins in 1896 at age 38, she moved to the Henry Street Settlement on the Lower East Side of Manhattan and worked as a visiting nurse for twenty years. She worked with poor immigrant laborers, providing preventive care and health education.

Dock and Ethel Gordon Fenwick founded the International Council of Nurses in 1899, which offered a platform for nurses around the world to connect and improve public health. Dock took up the role of secretary.

In 1907, Dock wrote two volumes of the History of Nursing with Mary Adelaide Nutting, which she revised and to which she added two more volumes alone in 1912. She went on to author several other books on the history of nursing as well, as she believed the position of nursing could only be solidified with accurate documentation of its history.

Dock helped organize the former National Association of Colored Graduate Nurses in 1908.

In 1910, Dock published Hygiene and Morality, in which she opposed state-regulated prostitution and supported treatment of venereal disease.

Dock withdrew from nursing at around age 50 and focused more on contemporary social matters.

== Social Reform ==
Dock was a great proponent of gender equality and most notably women's suffrage throughout her life. In 1896, Dock moved to the Henry Street Settlement on the Lower East Side of Manhattan, where her friend Lillian Wald resided. There she became socially active. She joined the Women's Trade Union League (WTUL). She participated in the New York shirtwaist strike of 1909 in support of the employees who walked off, most of which were women. In 1907, she joined the Equality League of Self Supporting Women and involved herself with the NY Women's Trade Union.

As a nurse at the Henry Street Settlement, she also cared for poor immigrant laborers which led her to develop a sense of "strong sympathy with oppressed classes" that went against a common nursing belief at the time that their professionalization depended on their distance from these problems. During her work there, she understood the inextricable relationship between lifestyle and health. She and other public health nurses there became "chief authorities on immigrant health and public health reform in New York City". As the secretary of the International Council of Nurses for more than twenty years, she continued her activism to involve nurses in public health throughout her life.

Dock moved to Washington, D.C. in 1917 and joined the advisory council of the National Woman's Party, led by Alice Paul. Dock campaigned for women's suffrage by leading several protests, including pickets at the White House. In 1912, she walked in the suffrage hike from New York City to Albany. She was arrested after militant demonstrations in June 1917, August 1917 and August 1918.

In the June 30, 1917 issue of The Suffragist, Dock wrote an article that ended "The young are at the gates!" which became a rallying cry on banners during picketing at the White House. She participated in protest movements for women's rights that resulted in the 1920 passage of the 19th Amendment to the U.S. Constitution, which granted women the right to vote.

Her public health and gender equality work intersected in her support for the treatment of venereal disease (which she discussed in her book Hygiene and Morality) and her emphasis on widespread access to information about birth control in her speech at the New York Academy of Medicine.

Also linked with her promotion of gender equality, Dock urged for nursing to be declared a profession to establish nursing authority in the medical field in her speech at the World's Columbian Exposition at the World's Fair in Chicago and worked to do so through her formation of the Nurses Associated Alumnae and the American Society of Superintendents of Training Schools. Dock further campaigned for legislation to allow nurses rather than physicians to control their profession.

== Later life ==
She retired to the family farm in Fayetteville, Pennsylvania in 1922 with her four single sisters.

Dock became deaf in her later years. She died from bronchopneumonia on April 17, 1956, after suffering a broken hip in a fall.

== Legacy ==
The American Association for the History of Nursing has named an award in honor of Dock. The Lavinia L. Dock Award for Exemplary Historical Research and Writing recognizes outstanding writing and research in a book by an experienced scholar of nursing history.

In 1976, Dock was inducted into the American Nurses Association's Hall of Fame.

== Bibliography ==
- A history of nursing; the evolution of nursing systems from the earliest times to the foundation of the first...
- Text-book of Materia Medica for Nurses.
- Hygiene and Morality: A Manual for Nurses and Others, Giving an Outline of the Medical, Social, and Legal Aspects...
- History of American Red Cross Nursing.
