= Jessie M. Scott =

American nurse and administrator

- Born: May 2, 1915; Wilkes-Barre, Pennsylvania
- Died: October 20, 2009 (aged 94); Washington, D.C.
- Occupations: Nurse, former Assistant Surgeon General
- Awards: Living Legend, American Academy of Nursing

Jessie May Scott (May 2, 1915 - October 20, 2009) was an American nurse and healthcare administrator. She served as Assistant Surgeon General and directed the nursing division of the United States Public Health Service (PHS). Scott advocated for nursing education at the federal level and she received several awards from national organizations honoring her contributions to nursing.

== Biography ==
=== Early life ===
Scott was born to Chester and Eva Snyder Scott in Wilkes-Barre, Pennsylvania. She had rheumatic fever when she was a baby. As a child, she interacted with a school nurse who frequently assessed her health. After earning a diploma from the nursing program at Wilkes-Barre General Hospital and working as a nurse for a few years, Scott earned an undergraduate degree from the University of Pennsylvania.

After finishing that degree, she was the educational director and anatomy instructor for a hospital nursing school in Philadelphia. Returning to school at Teachers College, Columbia University, she earned a master's degree. Scott undertook a post-master's program in counseling and guidance at Temple University. She worked as a counselor and assistant executive secretary at the Professional Counseling and Placement Service of the Pennsylvania Nurses Association.

=== United States Public Health Service ===
Scott served as Assistant Surgeon General and director of the Division of Nursing Health Resources Administration of the United States Public Health Service (PHS). She testified before Congress on nursing education needs. Some of her testimony led to the creation of the Nurse Training Act of 1964, the first peacetime federal legislative initiative for training nurses. At PHS, Scott supervised nursing theorist Imogene King, who was assistant chief of the nursing research grants branch. King's theoretical framework was published while she worked for Scott at PHS. By the mid-1960s, the PHS division had a $10 million budget.

=== Later life and legacy ===
Scott received the Public Health Service Distinguished Service Medal in 1973. She received the American Nurses Association (ANA) Honorary Recognition Award the next year. She retired from PHS in 1979 as a rear admiral. Scott had extensive involvement in international nursing. She worked as a consultant to international organizations in India and Israel. She was named among the first group of Living Legends of the American Academy of Nursing in 1994.

Scott died on October 20, 2009, in hospice care at The Washington Home in Washington, D.C. She had been suffering from congestive heart failure. She was posthumously inducted into the ANA Hall of Fame in 2014. The ANA awards the Jessie M. Scott Award to a nurse who exhibits work that creates links between nursing research, education and practice. In 1996, the award was presented to nursing theorist Imogene M. King.

== See also ==
- List of Living Legends of the American Academy of Nursing
