= VNS Health =

American nursing organization

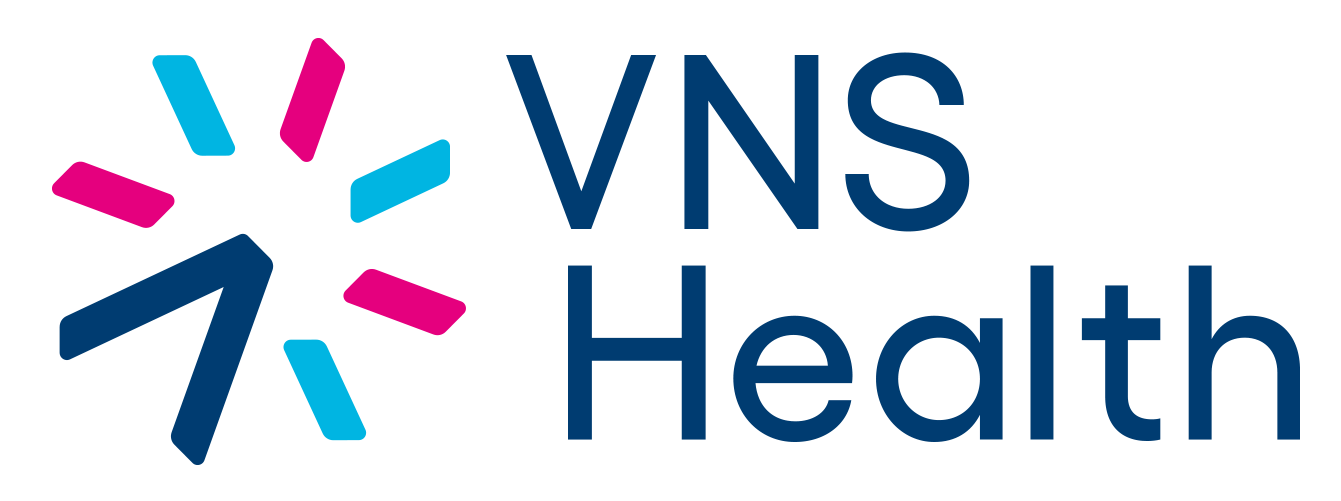
- Formation: 1893
- Founded: 1893
- Type: Health Care
- Legal status: Not-for-profit organization
- Purpose: home health care
- Headquarters: New York City
- Region served: New York City; Nassau, Suffolk, and Westchester Counties; parts of Upstate New York
- President and CEO: Dan Savitt
- Subsidiaries: VNSNY, Visiting Nurse Service of New York, VNSNY CHOICE health plans
- Staff: 16,500+

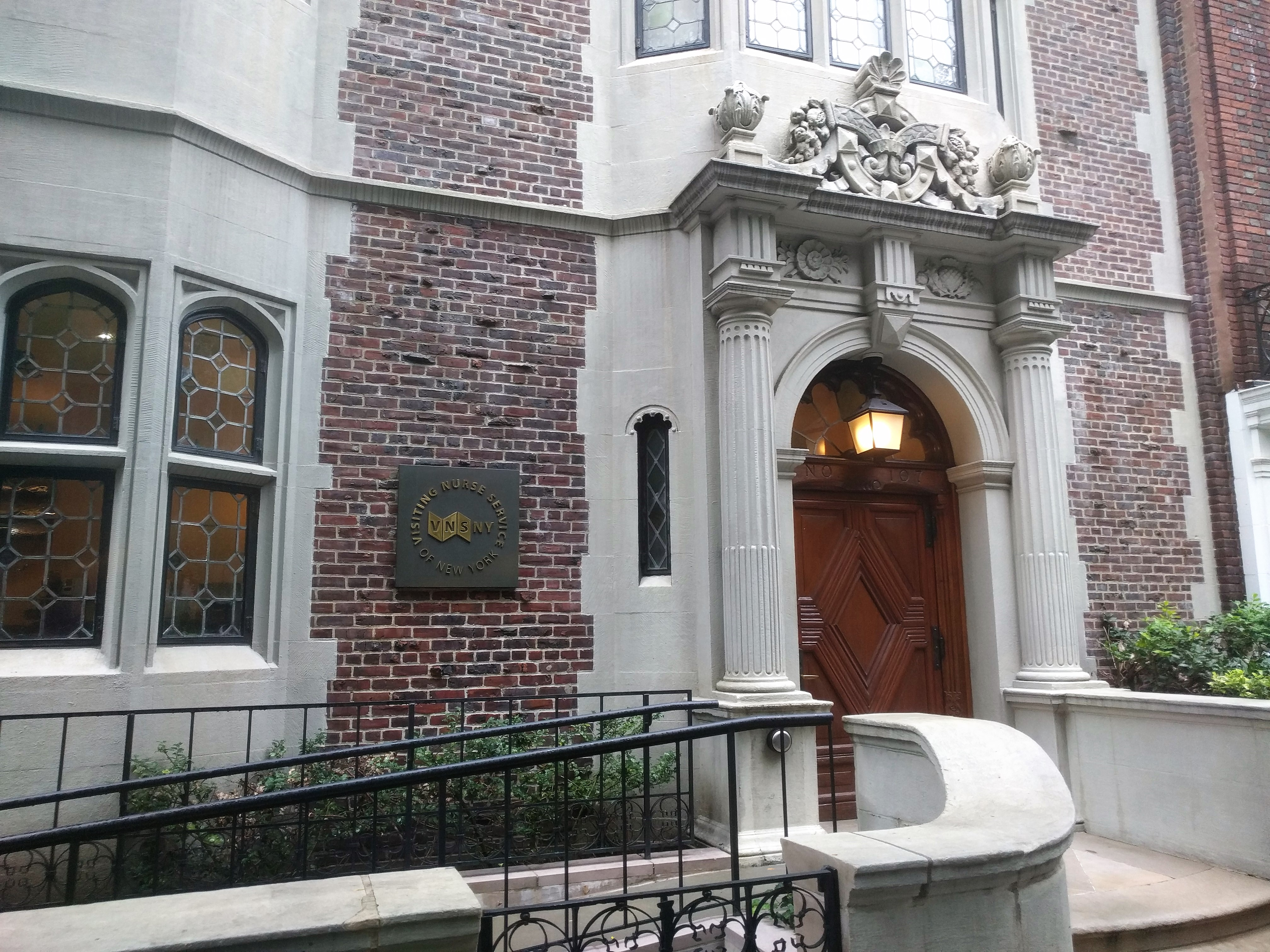
Visiting Nurse Service office

Founded in 1893 by nursing pioneer Lillian D. Wald and Mary M. Brewster, VNS Health is one of the largest not-for-profit home- and community-based health care organizations in the United States, serving the five boroughs of New York City; Nassau, Suffolk, and Westchester Counties; and parts of upstate New York.

== Background ==
Lillian Wald, the founder of public health nursing, began her mission on the Lower East Side of Manhattan. At the time, this was the most densely populated area in the world. In 1893 Wald founded the Nurses' Settlement, which later changed its name to the Henry Street Settlement. In 1895, banker and philanthropist Jacob Schiff purchased the Federal style townhouse at 265 Henry Street for the new organization to use, and expansion continued to adjacent buildings over the next few years. Henry Street Settlement funded the first nurse in the New York City public schools—an innovation that led to the creation of a citywide public school nurse program, the first in the world. By 1940, nearly 300 visiting nurses were providing medical care throughout New York City. Henry Street Settlement's nurse service became the Visiting Nurse Service of New York. On May 18, 2022, the Visiting Nurse Service of New York rebranded to VNS Health.

== Corporate information ==
=== Staff ===
The VNS Health workforce consists of licensed practical and registered nurses; physical, occupational, and speech-language therapists; social workers; home health aides and home attendants, physicians, registered dietitians, and psychologists.

VNS Health has received more than 90 national and regional awards from the American Nurses Association, American Public Health Association, Visiting Nurse Associations of America, New York Academy of Medicine, New York Times Tribute to Nurses, New York University College of Nursing, Home Care Association of New York State, Crain's New York Business, Public Health Association of New York City, and the national associations of Social Workers, Hispanic Nurses, Chinese American Nurses, among many others.

The current President and CEO of VNS Health is Dan Savitt.

=== Research center ===
The company researches to increase the evidence base for health care at home, and established the VNS Health Center for Home Care Policy & Research in 1993. Its IT innovations have been the subject of research

=== Advocacy ===
VNS Health acts as a liaison between patient and government bodies such as the state and federal legislatures, as well as regulatory bodies such as the Centers for Medicare and Medicaid Services and the New York State Department of Health and the Department of Insurance.

== Legal Settlements and Controversies ==
The company paid $35 million to the federal Medicaid program in order to settle a civil suit alleging it enrolled ineligible people into Medicaid plans, and is currently defending allegations it claimed Medicaid and Medicare income for the care ordered by doctors but never delivered.

VNS Health (formerly the Visiting Nurse Service of New York) has resolved significant federal and state fraud allegations through major financial settlements. In June 2020, the organization agreed to pay $57 million to settle a whistleblower lawsuit alleging violations of the False Claims Act; the suit claimed the agency billed Medicare and Medicaid for home care visits that were either not provided or only partially performed, often falsifying timesheets to maximize revenue. This settlement, which did not include an admission of liability, was the largest ever paid by a non-profit home care agency at the time. More recently, in June 2024, VNS Health paid approximately $1 million ($954,416) to resolve a separate case involving its Far Rockaway Assertive Community Treatment program, where it admitted to billing Medicaid for services not provided or documented for 103 patients with serious mental illness between 2014 and 2018.

== See also ==
- Visiting Nurse Association
