= Lillian Wald =

American nurse, activist, and author (1867–1940)

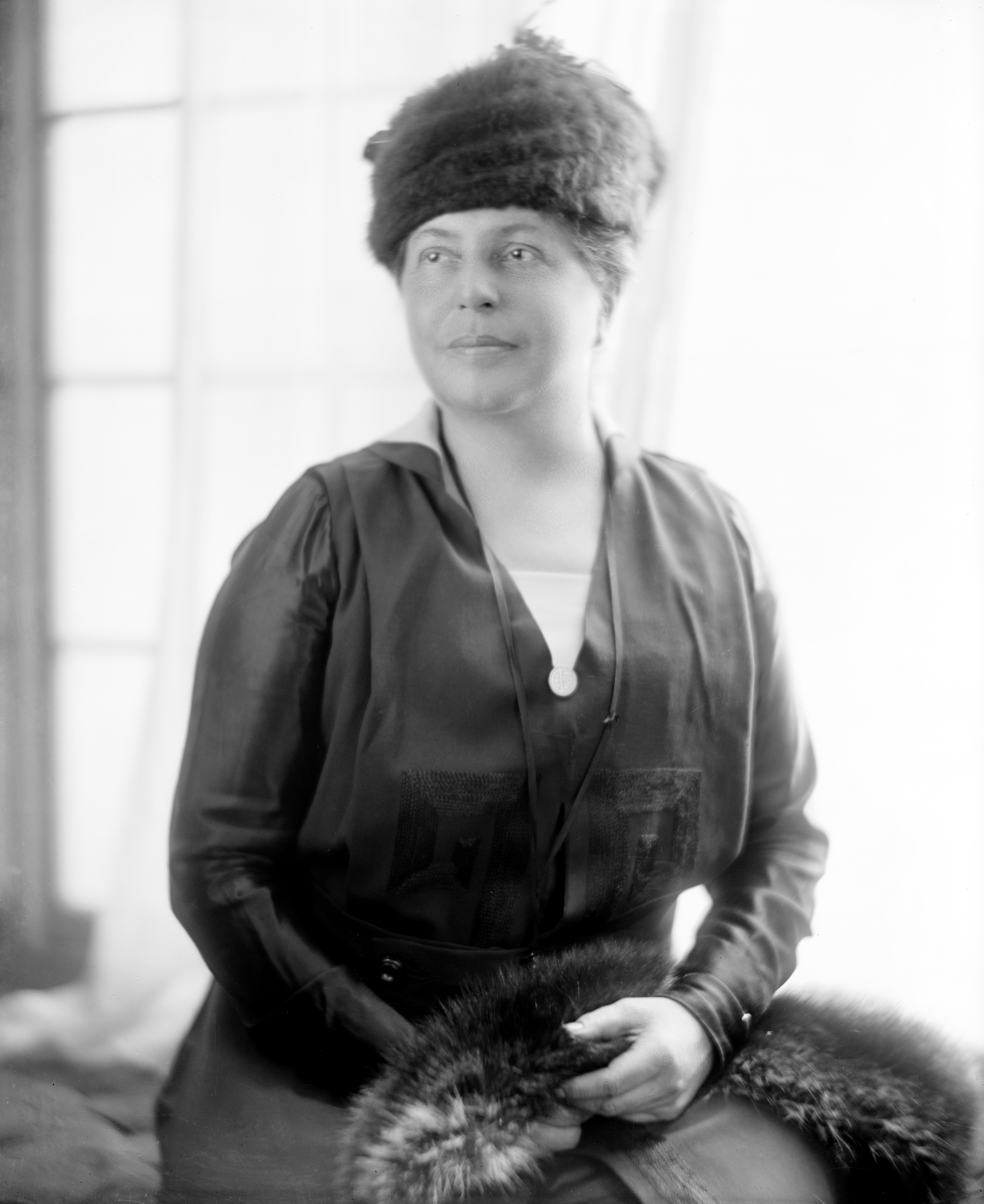
- Wald, c. 1905-1940
- Born: March 10, 1867; Cincinnati, Ohio, U.S.
- Died: September 1, 1940 (aged 73); Westport, Connecticut, U.S.
- Resting place: Mount Hope Cemetery; Rochester, New York, U.S.
- Education: New York Hospital Training School for Nurses
- Occupations: Nurse, humanitarian, activist
- Known for: Founding the Henry Street Settlement; nursing pioneer, advocacy for the poor

Lillian D. Wald (March 10, 1867 – September 1, 1940) was an American nurse, humanitarian, human rights activist and author. An early advocate for nurses in public schools, she started American community nursing and founded the Henry Street Settlement in New York City.

After growing up in Ohio and New York, Wald became a nurse. She briefly attended medical school and began to teach community health classes. After founding the Henry Street Settlement, she became an activist for the rights of women and minorities. She campaigned for suffrage and advocated racial integration. She was involved in the founding of the National Association for the Advancement of Colored People (NAACP).

Lillian Wald was a pioneering nurse and social reformer who played a crucial role in establishing public health nursing in the United States. She wrote two books relating to her community health work, The House on Henry Street (1911) and Windows on Henry Street (1934). She emphasized the importance of community-based nursing, hygiene education, and disease prevention, which became fundamental principles in modern nursing.

Wald died in 1940 at the age of 73.

== Early life and education ==
Wald was born into a wealthy German-Jewish medical family in Cincinnati, Ohio. Her parents were Max D. Wald and Minnie (Schwarz) Wald. Her father was an optical dealer. In 1878, she moved with her family to Rochester, New York and attended Miss Cruttenden's English-French Boarding and Day School for Young Ladies. She applied to Vassar College at the age of 16, but the school thought that she was too young. In 1889, she attended New York Hospital's School of Nursing. She graduated from the New York Hospital Training School for Nurses in 1891, then took courses at the Woman's Medical College.

== Nursing career ==
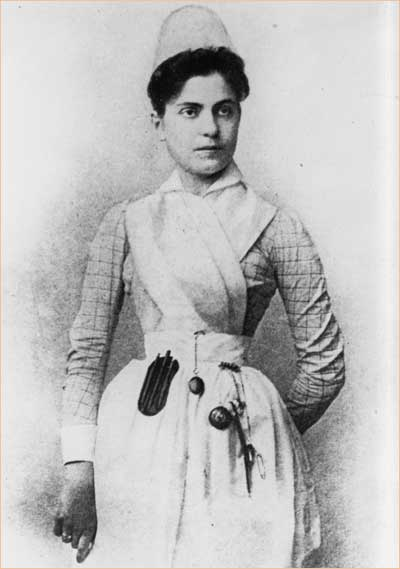
A young Lillian Wald in nurse uniform

Wald worked for a time at the New York Juvenile Asylum (now Children's Village), an orphanage where conditions were poor. By 1893, she left medical school and started to teach a home class on nursing for poor immigrant families on New York City's Lower East Side at the Hebrew Technical School for Girls. Shortly after that, she began to care for sick Lower East Side residents as a visiting nurse. Along with another nurse, Mary Brewster, she moved into a spartan room near her patients in order to care for them better. Around that time, she coined the term "public health nurse" to describe nurses whose work is integrated into the public community.

Wald advocated for nursing in public schools. Her ideas led the New York Board of Health to organize the first public nursing system in the world. Wald's nursing leadership was also critical to steering New York through the 1918 Spanish flu pandemic. During the pandemic, she chaired the Nurses' Emergency Council, which provided visiting nursing to sick families in their homes.

Wald was the first president of the National Organization for Public Health Nursing. She also established a nursing insurance partnership with Metropolitan Life Insurance Company that became a model for many other corporate projects. She suggested a national health insurance plan and helped to found the Columbia University School of Nursing. Wald authored two books relating to her community health work, The House on Henry Street (1911) and Windows on Henry Street (1934).

Wald founded the Henry Street Settlement. The organization attracted the attention of prominent Jewish philanthropist Jacob Schiff, who secretly provided Wald with money to more effectively help the "poor Russian Jews" whose care she provided. By 1906, Wald had 27 nurses on staff, and she succeeded in attracting broader financial support from such gentiles as Elizabeth Milbank Anderson. By 1913, the staff had grown to 92 people. The Henry Street Settlement eventually developed as the Visiting Nurse Service of New York.

== The Henry Street Settlement ==
Wald's vision for Henry Street was one unlike any others at the time. Wald believed that every New York City resident was entitled to equal and fair health care regardless of their social or socio-economic status, race, gender, or age. She argued that everyone should have access to at-home care. A strong advocate for adequate bedside manner, Wald believed that regardless of whether a person could afford at-home care, they deserved to be treated with the same level of respect that some who could afford it would be.

=== Social benefits ===
Arguably one of the most significant developments in the public health sector, the Settlement did much more than provide better medical care. Primarily focusing on the care of women and children, the Settlement changed the landscape of public health care in New York City. Its programs helped to cut back on the time patients spent at hospitals while also making at-home care more accessible and efficient.

Wald was a strong advocate for community support. Much of the Henry Street Settlement's initial success was from Wald's diligent and persistent work at cultivating personal relationships with the Settlement's donors. Wald was also a strong advocate for the social benefit of having donors who lived within the community. These benefits included the temporary break-up of families when people were forced to spend time in the hospital, improved quality of at-home care, and reduced medical expenses by offering an alternative to hospital stays.

=== Employment of women ===
Wald provided a unique opportunity for women's employment through the Settlement. In her letters, she spoke with donors about the employment opportunities provided to women at the Settlement and the many benefits they offer. One of the most notable benefits was the opportunity for women to have a career and to build their wealth independent of husbands or families. Employment also provided women with the opportunity to work outside of the home and gain independence from their husbands.

== Community outreach and advocacy ==
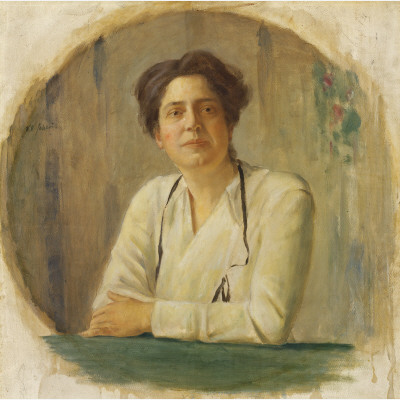
Portrait of Lillian Wald by William Valentine Schevill, National Portrait Gallery in Washington, D.C.

Wald also taught women how to cook and sew, provided recreational activities for families, and was involved in the labor movement. Out of her concern for women's working conditions, she helped to found the Women's Trade Union League in 1903 and later served as a member of the executive committee of the New York City League. In 1910, Wald and several colleagues went on a six-month tour of Hawaii, Japan, China, and Russia, a trip that increased her involvement in worldwide humanitarian issues.

In 1915, Wald founded the Henry Street Neighborhood Playhouse. She was an early leader of the Child Labor Committee, which became the National Child Labor Committee (NCLC). The group lobbied for federal child labor laws and promoted childhood education. In the 1920s, the organization proposed an amendment to the U.S. Constitution that would have banned child labor. In the 1920s, Wald was a vocal proponent of the social welfare initiatives of New York Governor Al Smith, and in 1928, she actively supported Smith's presidential campaign.

Wald was also concerned about the treatment of African Americans. As a civil rights activist, she insisted that all Henry Street classes be racially integrated. In 1909, she became a founding member of the National Association for the Advancement of Colored People (NAACP). The organization's first major public conference opened at the Henry Street Settlement.

Wald organized New York City campaigns for suffrage, marched to protest the entry of the United States into World War I, joined the Woman's Peace Party, and helped to establish the Women's International League for Peace and Freedom. In 1915, she was elected president of the newly formed American Union Against Militarism (AUAM). She remained involved with the AUAM's daughter organizations, the Foreign Policy Organization, and the American Civil Liberties Union after the United States joined the war.

== Personal life ==
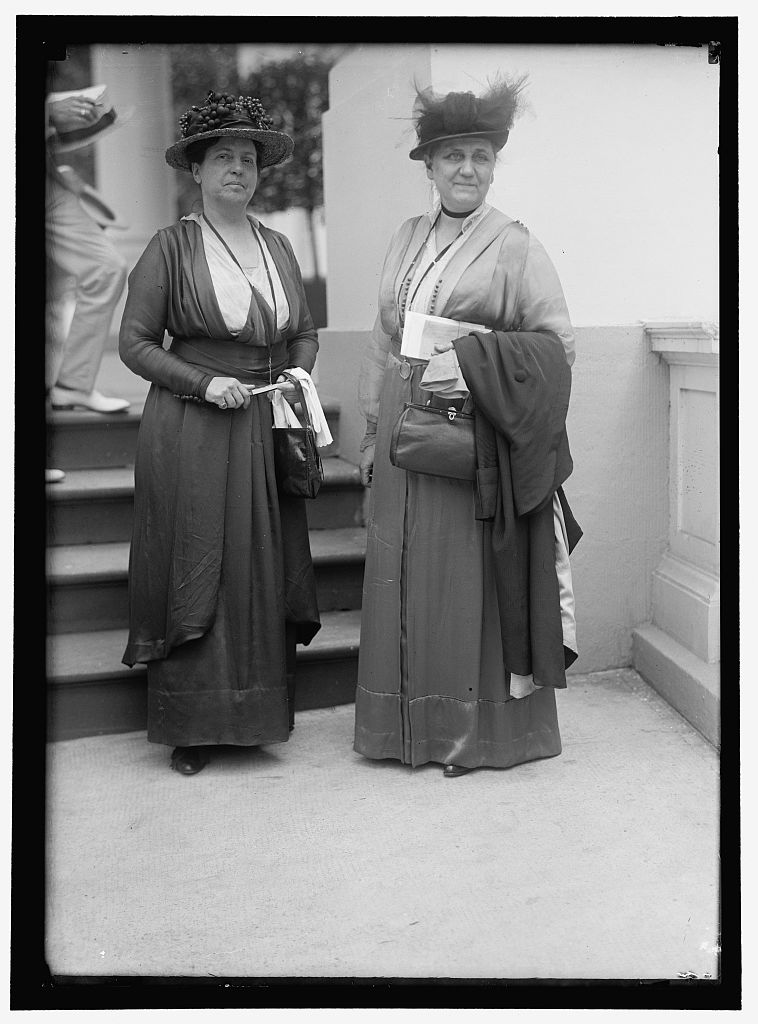
Lillian Wald, and Jane Addams, 1916

Wald established a close community of women at Henry Street with whom she had both romantic and platonic relationships. She had two romantic relationships, one with lawyer Helen Arthur and another with economist and social worker Mabel Hyde Kittredge, who helped Wald initiate a public-school lunch program. Historian Blanche Wiesen Cook has written about Wald’s love letters, the relationships at Henry Street Settlement, and the self-described terms the women used for their relationships that moved between friendship and romantic, referring to each other as “steadies” and “crushes”. Author Clare Coss writes that Wald "remained in the end forever elusive. She preferred personal independence, which allowed her to move quickly, travel freely and act boldly." Wald's personal life and focus on independence were evident in her devotion to the Settlement and improving public health.

== Later life ==
She died of a cerebral hemorrhage on September 1, 1940. A rabbi conducted a memorial service at Henry Street's Neighborhood Playhouse. A private service was also held at Wald's home. A few months later, at Carnegie Hall, over 2,000 people gathered at a tribute to Wald that included messages delivered by the president, governor, and mayor. She was interred at Mount Hope Cemetery in Rochester.

== Legacy ==
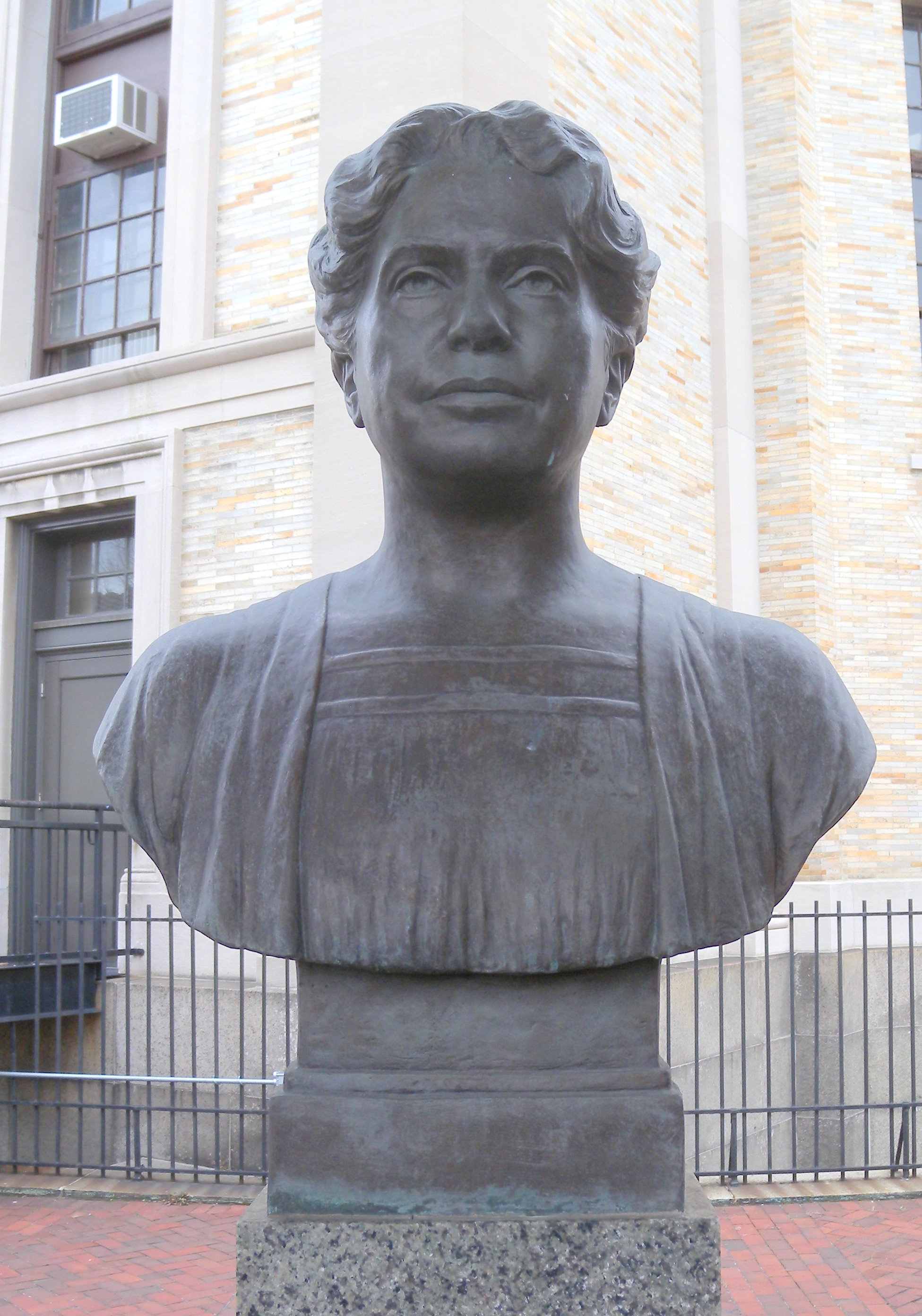
Bust of Lillian Wald at the Hall of Fame for Great Americans

The New York Times named Wald as one of the 12 greatest living American women in 1922, and she later received the Lincoln Medallion for her work as an "Outstanding Citizen of New York." In 1937, during a radio broadcast celebrating Wald's 70th birthday, Sara Delano Roosevelt read a letter from her son, President Franklin Roosevelt, in which he praised Wald for her "unselfish labor to promote the happiness and well-being of others."

Author Helen Dore Boylston describes Lillian Wald and Henry Street in her third novel, Sue Barton, Visiting Nurse (1938), where Sue Barton meets Lillian Wald in the Henry Street settlement.

Wald was elected to the Hall of Fame for Great Americans in 1970. In 1993, Wald was inducted into the National Women's Hall of Fame. The Lillian Wald Houses on Avenue D in Manhattan were named for her.

Wald paved the way for women in the public health world in numerous ways: As a medical provider, an employer, and an educator. Her legacy is still seen today in the Visiting Nurses Service of New York.

== See also ==
- List of nurses
- List of peace activists
