= American Journal of Nursing =

- Discipline: Nursing
- Language: English
- Edited by: Carl A. Kirton

Publication details
- History: 1900-present
- Publisher: Lippincott Williams & Wilkins
- Frequency: Monthly
- Open access: Hybrid
- Impact factor: 2.7 (2022)

Standard abbreviations
- ISO 4: Am. J. Nurs.

Indexing
- CODEN: AJNUAK
- ISSN: 0002-936X (print); 1538-7488 (web)
- LCCN: 06036097
- JSTOR: 0002936X
- OCLC no.: 1743347

Links
- Journal homepage; Online access; Online archive

The American Journal of Nursing (AJN) is a monthly peer-reviewed nursing journal established in 1900. As of 2022, the editor-in-chief is Carl Kirton and it is published by Lippincott Williams & Wilkins.

In 2009, the journal was selected as one of the "100 Most Influential Journals in Biology and Medicine in the Last 100 Years" by the Biomedical and Life Sciences Division of the Special Libraries Association.

== History ==
The journal was established in 1900 as the official journal of the Associated Alumnae of Trained Nurses of the United States which later became the American Nurses Association. Isabel Hampton Robb, Lavinia Dock, Mary E. P. Davis and Sophia Palmer are credited with founding the journal, the latter serving as the first editor. Other editors have included Mary May Roberts (1921–1949), Nell V. Beeby (1949–1956), Jeanette V. White (1956–1957), Edith P. Lewis (1957–1959), Barbara G. Schutt (1959–1971), Thelma M. Schorr (1971–1981), Mary B. Mallison (1981–1993), Lucille A. Joel (1993–1998), Diana J. Mason (1998–2009), Maureen S. Kennedy (2009–2022), and Carl Kirton (2022-present)

The journal was originally published by J. B. Lippincott & Co. In 1996, Lippincott Williams & Wilkins purchased the journal from the association of which it ceased to be the official journal, to the disappointment of then editor Mason.

== Abstracting and indexing ==
The journal is abstracted and indexed in:

- Chemical Abstracts Service
- CINAHL
- Current Contents/Social and Behavioral Sciences
- EBSCO databases
- Embase
- Index Medicus/MEDLINE/PubMed
- ProQuest databases
- Scopus
- Social Sciences Citation Index

According to the Journal Citation Reports, the journal has a 2022 impact factor of 2.7.
