= Rostrup =

Rostrup is a Danish and Norwegian surname. Notable people with the surname include:

- Emil Rostrup (1831–1907), Danish botanist, mycologist and plant pathologist
- Jørgen Rostrup (born 1978), Norwegian orienteer
- Kaspar Rostrup (1940–2025), Danish film director
- Kaspar Rostrup (businessman) (1845–1911), Danish lawyer, joiner and local politician
- Morten Rostrup (born 1958), Norwegian physician
- Sofie Rostrup (1857–1940), Danish entomologist and teacher

== See also ==
- Espen Rostrup Nakstad (born 1975), Norwegian physician, lawyer and author, nephew of Morten Rostrup
- Frostrup (Frøstrup), a surname
