= Bjorn Larsen =

Bjorn Larsen or Bjørn Larsen may refer to

- Bjørn Larsen (economist) (1922–2007), Norwegian economist and civil servant
- Bjorn Larsen (rower) (born 1979), American rower
- Bjørn-Inge Larsen (born 1961), Norwegian physician and civil servant
- Claus Bjørn Larsen (born 1963), Danish press photographer
- Niels Bjørn Larsen (1913–2003), Danish ballet dancer, choreographer and balletmester
- Bjørn Larsen (politician) (born 1967), Norwegian politician
