= Bedsted =

Bedsted may refer to:

- Bedsted, Thisted Municipality, a village in Thisted Municipality, Denmark, also known as Bedsted Thy
  - Bedsted Thy railway station, a railway station in that village
- Bedsted, Tønder Municipality, a village in Tønder Municipality, Denmark, also known as Bedsted Løgum
  - Bedsted Løgum railway station, a former railway station in that village
- Bedsted, Schleswig-Holstein, the Danish name for the village Bedstedt in Süderbrarup, Schleswig-Holstein, Germany
