= 2021 Thisted municipal election =

- 16 November 2021

All 27 seats to the Thisted Municipal Council 14 seats needed for a majority
- Turnout: 23,981 (69.6%) ▼4.8pp
	First party	Second party	Third party
	A	V	C
Party	Social Democrats	Venstre	Conservatives
Last election	9 seats, 34.3%	6 seats, 21.9%	5 seats, 16.2%
Seats won	9	7	6
Seat change	0	▲1	▲1
Popular vote	8,249	5,403	5,005
Percentage	34.8%	22.8%	21.1%
Swing	▲0.5%	▲0.9%	▲4.9%
	Fourth party	Fifth party	Sixth party
	Ø	O	D
Party	Red–Green Alliance	Danish People's Party	New Right
Last election	1 seat, 3.9%	3 seats, 10.9%	0 seats, 0.4%
Seats won	1	1	1
Seat change	0	▼2	▲1
Popular vote	931	872	801
Percentage	3.9%	3.7%	3.4%
Swing	0.0%	▼7.2%	▲3.0%
	Seventh party	Eighth party	Ninth party
	F	Å	I
Party	Green Left	The Alternative	Liberal Alliance
Last election	1 seat, 4.3%	1 seat, 2.4%	1 seat, 3.9%
Seats won	1	1	0
Seat change	0	0	▼1
Popular vote	761	577	417
Percentage	3.2%	2.4%	1.8%
Swing	▼1.1%	▼0.7%	▼2.1%
Mayor before election
Ulla Jensen
Social Democrats
Mayor after election
Niels Pedersen
Venstre

In 2017, Lene Kjeldgaard from Venstre failed to become mayor for a third term. Instead Ulla Vestergaard from the Social Democrats became mayor, the first from the party to do so since 2007 municipal reform.

However, despite the Social Democrats increasing their vote share by 0.5% in this election, a constitution that would see Niels Pedersen from Venstre become mayor, was announced. The constitution were solely made by parties from the traditional blue bloc, namely Conservatives, New Right, Danish People's Party and Venstre.

== Electoral system ==
For elections to Danish municipalities, a number varying from 9 to 31 are chosen to be elected to the municipal council. The seats are then allocated using the D'Hondt method and a closed list proportional representation. Thisted Municipality had 27 seats in 2021

Unlike in Danish General Elections, in elections to municipal councils, electoral alliances are allowed.

== Electoral alliances ==
=== Electoral Alliance 1 ===
Party		Political alignment
B	Social Liberals	Centre to Centre-left
F	Green Left	Centre-left to Left-wing
Ø	Red–Green Alliance	Left-wing to Far-Left
Å	The Alternative	Centre-left to Left-wing

=== Electoral Alliance 2 ===
Party		Political alignment
C	Conservatives	Centre-right
I	Liberal Alliance	Centre-right to Right-wing
K	Christian Democrats	Centre to Centre-right
V	Venstre	Centre-right

=== Electoral Alliance 3 ===
Party		Political alignment
D	New Right	Right-wing to Far-right
O	Danish People's Party	Right-wing to Far-right

== Results by polling station ==
Polling Station	A	B	C	D	F	I	K	O	V	Ø	Å	Q
Polling Station	%	%	%	%	%	%	%	%	%	%	%	%
Thisted By	43.0	1.9	17.6	3.3	3.9	1.6	0.9	2.8	17.6	5.1	2.2	0.2
Harring-Stagstrup	36.8	1.1	21.1	3.0	2.6	0.8	0.6	4.4	25.7	2.0	2.0	0.0
Hillerslev-Kåstrup	26.4	3.8	14.5	3.2	2.6	1.2	1.0	3.8	39.6	3.2	0.4	0.4
Hundborg-Jannerup	30.3	2.0	21.7	4.0	3.8	1.0	2.6	4.8	17.7	6.8	5.2	0.0
Vorupør	20.1	0.5	33.6	2.4	6.2	0.0	0.0	4.7	27.0	4.5	1.0	0.2
Nors-Tved	24.7	3.4	13.2	3.2	1.5	18.7	0.8	2.5	27.6	2.3	2.0	0.1
Sennels	25.2	15.1	16.0	2.8	1.8	2.4	0.0	2.3	21.3	1.3	11.5	0.1
Sjørring-Thorsted	38.7	1.7	21.2	2.1	3.9	1.7	0.5	2.4	21.9	2.6	3.3	0.0
Skjoldborg-Kallerup	25.6	1.5	30.1	5.4	3.9	1.8	1.2	4.5	22.3	3.6	0.0	0.0
Snedsted-Nørhå	30.5	0.7	28.6	5.9	3.0	0.6	0.6	9.4	15.4	3.7	1.5	0.1
Sønderhå-Hørsted	28.2	3.5	25.6	3.5	3.1	0.0	0.0	5.3	24.2	3.5	3.1	0.0
Thisted Landsogn	41.4	1.9	19.8	2.6	3.0	1.6	1.0	2.7	20.2	3.9	1.8	0.1
Vang-Tvorup	29.7	1.9	15.1	5.7	5.2	1.9	2.8	8.0	16.0	9.0	4.7	0.0
Skinnerup, V Og Ø Vandet	22.4	3.7	20.0	6.6	2.1	2.9	1.3	2.1	31.3	5.3	2.4	0.0
Øsløs, Vesløs Og Arup	39.7	1.3	10.5	3.3	4.9	1.0	0.3	5.2	27.0	4.7	2.0	0.2
Østerild, Hunstrup	33.4	0.7	19.1	2.3	2.0	0.9	0.2	3.0	34.9	1.8	1.1	0.5
Hanstholm	35.3	0.2	27.1	3.8	2.5	0.8	0.3	3.0	24.1	2.2	0.7	0.1
Ræhr/Vigsø	31.1	0.5	30.8	3.3	0.8	1.3	0.8	1.5	26.5	2.1	1.0	0.3
Klitmøller	35.8	4.3	12.5	2.4	4.2	1.3	0.3	1.9	12.9	12.9	11.4	0.1
Frøstrup	23.9	0.5	7.4	2.7	11.9	0.5	0.7	6.7	32.9	8.9	3.7	0.2
Lild	24.3	2.2	13.8	3.3	10.5	2.2	0.0	5.0	31.5	3.3	3.9	0.0
Bedsted	28.9	1.0	17.2	5.5	1.9	0.6	0.7	5.7	33.1	3.8	1.6	0.0
Hurup	40.4	1.0	27.6	3.2	1.8	0.4	0.7	2.8	20.3	1.5	0.3	0.1
Koldby	25.7	0.7	18.4	3.3	1.7	0.3	0.6	4.5	38.9	2.9	2.9	0.0
Vestervig	29.7	0.7	43.5	2.4	1.9	0.2	0.5	3.2	15.2	1.6	1.0	0.1
Ydby	34.9	1.3	26.6	2.8	3.0	0.6	0.3	4.1	21.5	3.5	1.4	0.0

== Results ==
Party		Votes	%	+/-	Seats	+/-
Thisted Municipality
A	Social Democrats	8,249	34.81	+0.53	9	0
V	Venstre	5,403	22.80	+0.86	7	+1
C	Conservatives	5,005	21.12	+4.92	6	+1
Ø	Red-Green Alliance	931	3.93	+0.04	1	0
O	Danish People's Party	872	3.68	-7.25	1	-2
D	New Right	801	3.38	+3.01	1	+1
F	Green Left	761	3.21	-1.14	1	0
Å	The Alternative	577	2.43	-0.65	1	0
B	Social Liberals	481	2.03	New	0	New
I	Liberal Alliance	417	1.76	-2.15	0	-1
K	Christian Democrats	170	0.72	-0.24	0	0
Q	Sten i Skoen	31	0.13	New	0	New
Total		23,698	100	N/A	27	N/A
Invalid votes		62	0.18	-0.07		
Blank votes		221	0.64	-0.21		
Turnout		23,981	69.55	-4.86		
Source: valg.dk
