= Lyder =

Lyder may refer to:

- Courtney Lyder
- Damian Lyder
- Danylo Lyder
- Dean Lyder
- Lyder Bull
- Lyder Sagen

== See also ==
- Lyderm
