= Cathrine Marie Lofthus =

Norwegian civil servant

- Born: 27 October 1970 (age 55)
- Education: University of Oslo
- Occupation: Civil servant

Cathrine Marie Lofthus (born 1970) is a Norwegian physician, health administrator and civil servant. Since 2025 she has been director of the Norwegian Directorate for Health. She served as secretary-general in the Ministry of Health and Care Services from 2021 to 2025.

== Personal life and career ==
Born on 27 October 1970, Lofthus has a dr. degree in medicine from the University of Oslo Faculty of Medicine, as well as administrative education.

From 2012 to 2015 she served as vice director of the Oslo University Hospital. She was chief executive of the Southern and Eastern Norway Regional Health Authority from 2015 to 2021. In 2021 she was appointed Secretary General (departementsråd) in the Ministry of Health and Care Services, succeeding Bjørn-Inge Larsen.

From August 2025 she is director of the Norwegian Directorate for Health, succeeding Mariann Hornmes, who had been acting director from January 2025, when Bjørn Guldvog ended his term, until August 2025.

Civic offices
Preceded by Mariann Hornnes (acting)	Director of the Norwegian Directorate for Health; 2025–	Succeeded by
Preceded by Bjørn-Inge Larsen	Permanent under-secretary of state in the Ministry of Health and Care Services; 2021–2025	Succeeded by
