= Ole Johan Sandvand =

Norwegian health executive (born 1947)

Ole Johan Sandvand (born 23 February 1947) is a Norwegian health executive.

He was born in Søndeled Municipality, finished his secondary education in Risør in 1966, and graduated from the University of Oslo in 1975 with the cand.polit. degree in political science. He was hired as a consultant in NAVF in 1973, and was promoted to head of department in NAVF's Council for Medical Research. He remained here until 1991, except for the year 1983 to 1984 when he was a research fellow at the University of California, Berkeley. In 1991, he also took a Master of Health Administration degree at the University of Oslo. In 1991 he was hired as managing director of Modum Bad Psychiatric Center.

Sandvand chaired the Nordic Institute for Studies in Innovation, Research and Education from 1995. Locally he has been a board member of the sports club Vikersund IF. Sandvand has also been a congregation council member in the Evangelical Lutheran Free Church of Norway from 1981 to 1990. It was a source of some criticism when Sandvand, with his Christian background, was selected as member of the National Council for Priority Setting in the Health Care under the tenure of Christian Democratic Minister of Health Dagfinn Høybråten.

Sandvand was also a board member of the Southern Norway Regional Health Authority. In 2003–2004, a controversy arose, especially between chair Oluf Arntsen and chief executive Steinar Stokke. The latter was behind a flawed project where patient diagnoses was to be coded in certain ways to be eligible for public funding. In January 2004, Arntsen tried to oust Stokke from the executive chair, following the "coding case" as well as roundhanded pension deals with company executives. Arntsen was supported by Sandvand and deputy chair Helen Bjørnøy, but was voted down by the rest of the board (Kaare Norum, Einfrid Halvorsen, Anne Mo Grimdalen, Terje Keyn, Morten Falkenberg and Svein Øverland). Arntsen subsequently had to resign, but in response, the Minister of Health Dagfinn Høybråten promptly relieved the entire board of their positions. Under a new board, which was composed in early February, Stokke only lasted two weeks in the executive chair.
