= Erik Himle =

Norwegian civil servant and politician

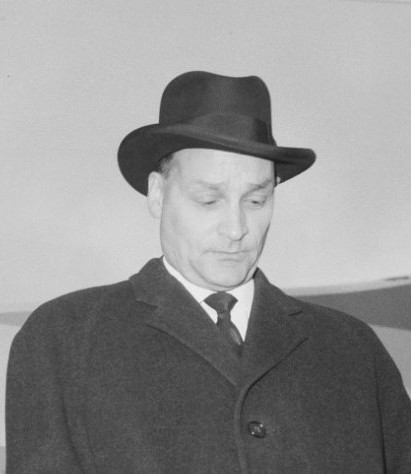
- Himle in 1964

Minister of Transport and Communications
- In office 20 January 1964 – 12 October 1965
- Prime Minister: Einar Gerhardsen
- Preceded by: Trygve Bratteli
- Succeeded by: Håkon Kyllingmark

Minister of Trade and Shipping
- In office 25 September 1963 – 20 January 1964
- Prime Minister: Einar Gerhardsen
- Preceded by: Kåre Willoch
- Succeeded by: Trygve Lie

Personal details
- Born: 10 April 1924 Fana, Norway
- Died: 30 July 2008 (aged 84) Nesbru, Norway
- Party: Labour Party
- Spouse: Else Winter
- Children: 3

Erik Himle (10 April 1924 – 30 July 2008) was a Norwegian civil servant and politician for the Labour Party.

Himle graduated with the cand.oecon. degree in 1948, and from the NATO Defence College in 1957. He was never elected as a politician, but worked himself upwards as a civil servant in Norwegian government ministries.

During the third cabinet Gerhardsen he became state secretary to the Minister of Defense 1958–1961 and to the Minister of Transport 1962–1963. In the fourth cabinet Gerhardsen he was appointed Minister of Trade and Shipping 1963–1964 and Minister of Transport 1964–1965. His last period as a state secretary was in the Office of the Prime Minister during the first cabinet Bratteli from 1971 to 1972. He continued as the permanent under-secretary of state in the Ministry of Defence 1967–1971 and 1973–1978 and in the Ministry of Petroleum and Energy 1978–1988.

Eisenhower Fellowships selected Erik Himle in 1966 to represent Norway.

He was born in Fana, and eventually settled in Nesbru. He died there in 2008. He had three children with wife Else Winter.

Political offices
Preceded by Kåre Willoch	Norwegian Minister of Trade and Shipping; 1963–1964	Succeeded by Trygve Lie
Preceded by Trygve Bratteli	Norwegian Minister of Transport; 1964–1965	Succeeded by Håkon Kyllingmark
Civic offices
Preceded by Jakob Modalsli	Permanent under-secretary of state in the Ministry of Defence; 1961–1962 (acting)	Succeeded by Jakob Modalsli
Preceded by Jakob Modalsli	Permanent under-secretary of state in the Ministry of Defence; 1967–1971	Succeeded by Bjørn Larsen (acting)
Preceded by Bjørn Larsen (acting)	Permanent under-secretary of state in the Ministry of Defence; 1973–1978	Succeeded by Caspar Stephansen
Preceded by position created	Permanent under-secretary of state in the Ministry of Petroleum and Energy; 1978–1988	Succeeded by Karl-Edwin Manshaus
