= Linda Sarna =

American nursing researcher and academic

Linda Sarna PhD, RN, FAAN
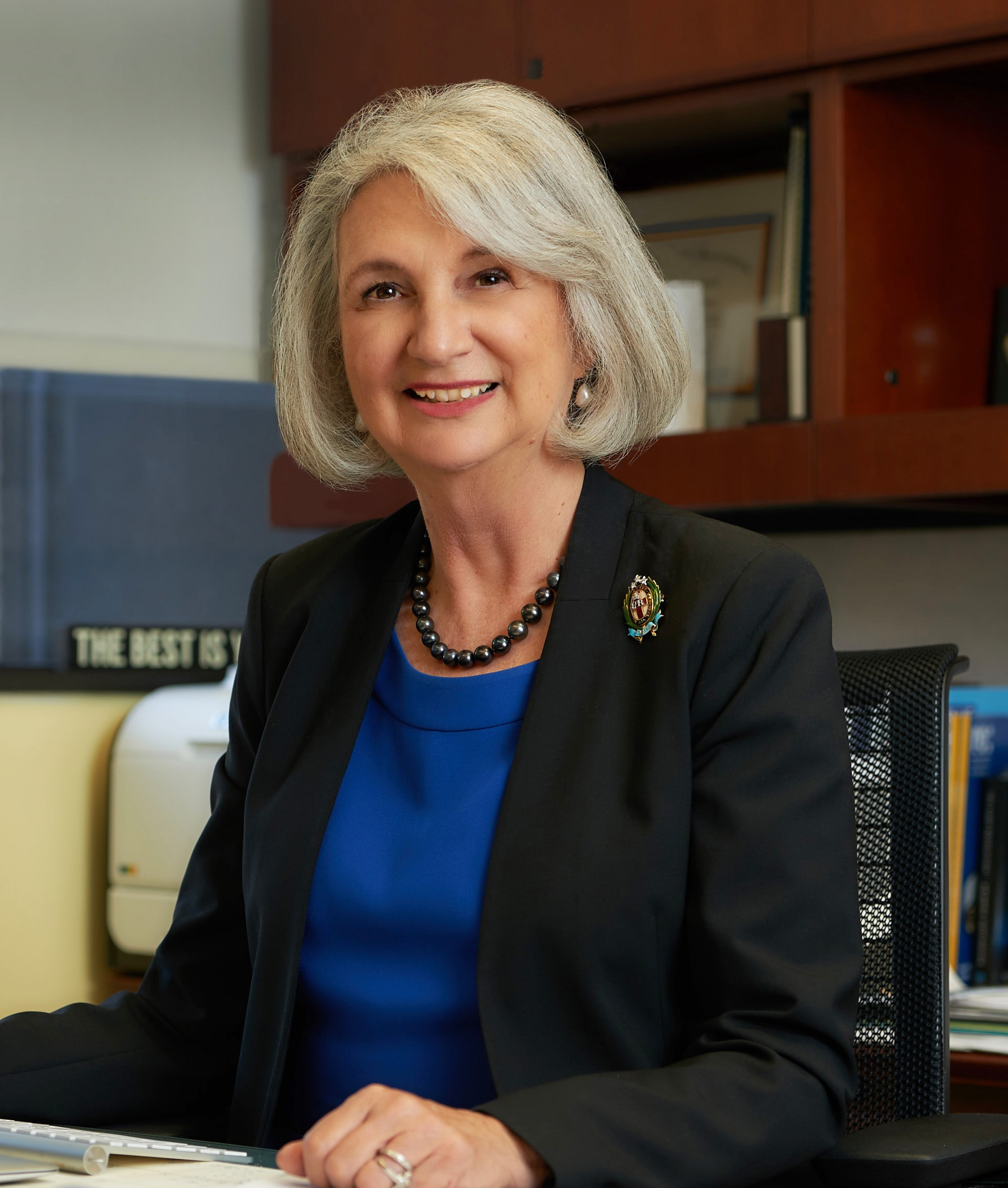
- Sarna in 2016
- Born: United States
- Education: UCLA, BS, 1969, Nursing; UCLA, MN, 1976, Oncology Nursing; UCSF, PhD (2012 converted from DNSc), 1989, Oncology Specialty
- Alma mater: University of California, Los Angeles (UCLA); UCLA School of Nursing; University of California, San Francisco (UCSF)
- Occupations: Nurse, college dean, professor
- Known for: Nursing, oncology nursing, tobacco control
- Website: www.nursing.ucla.edu/index.php/about-us/faculty-directory/linda-sarna

Linda Sarna is an American nursing researcher and academic. She is dean, professor and Lulu Wolf Hassenplug Chair of the UCLA School of Nursing. Sarna was appointed the school's seventh dean Nov. 15, 2016, after serving as acting dean (2014–2015) and interim dean (2015–2016).

== Education ==
Sarna received her education in the University of California system. She attended UCLA where she earned her BS in nursing in 1969 and her MN in Oncology Nursing in 1976. In 1989, she received her research-oriented DNSc in Oncology Specialty from UC San Francisco, which was later converted to a PhD.

== Career ==
Sarna is a fellow of the American Academy of Nursing, and recognized as a distinguished research professor by the Oncology Nursing Society. She has been inducted into Sigma Theta Tau's International Nurse Research Hall of Fame, and the Western Academy of Nursing. In 2018, she received the Oncology Nursing Society Lifetime Achievement Award.

An internationally recognized scholar in promoting the role of nursing in tobacco control and oncology research focused on patients with lung cancer, Sarna is co-founder of Tobacco Free Nurses (TNF). The TNF initiative, previously funded by the Robert Wood Johnson Foundation, helps nurses quit smoking and promote their role in tobacco control. Sarna's efforts to reduce tobacco use among nursing professionals have earned her several professional accolades, including a Distinguished Service Award from the International Society of Nurses in Cancer Care.

Sarna's recent work has focused on helping nurses around the world help patients quit smoking, especially those affected by cancer. She has collaborated with the International Society of Nurses in Cancer Care, in partnership with Dr. Stella Bialous, in China, Japan, the Czech Republic, Slovenia, Slovakia, Moldova, Hungary, Poland, Portugal and the United States. Other projects have included Korea, the Philippines and the Hong Kong Special Administrative Region (HK SAR). She also has monitored changes in smoking prevalence among the nursing profession in the U.S.

In 2016, Sarna was elected the first National Board Chair for the National Clinician Scholars Program (NCSP).

She was named one of The 30 Most Influential Deans of Nursing in a 2015 report prepared by Mometrix, which measured U.S. nursing deans' work, dedication and passion.

During the 2012–2013 academic year, Sarna served as chair of the UCLA Academic Senate.

== Honors, awards and affiliations ==
- 2018 Received Oncology Nursing Society (ONS) Lifetime Achievement Award Daily Nurse.
- 2017 Induction into the Western Academy of Nursing.
- 2017 Designated as an Edge Runner for Tobacco Free Nurses, with ISNCC President Stella Bialous, from the American Academy of Nursing.
- 2016 Elected first National Board Chair for the National Clinician Scholars Program (NCSP).
- 2016 Received Jane Norbeck Distinguished Alumnus Award, UCSF School of Nursing.
- 2015 Named one of The 30 Most Influential Nursing Deans in the United States (No. 16), by Mometrix.
- 2014 Inducted into International Nurse Researcher Hall of Fame, Sigma Theta Tau.
- 2009 Appointed as the Lulu Wolf Hassenplug Chair in Nursing.
- 2009 Awarded the NurseWeek Excellence Award: Advancing and Leading the Profession.
- 2004 Received distinguished Merit Award for Services to Cancer Nursing: International Society for Nurses in Cancer Care; Global Citizen Bronze.
- 1994 Elected Fellow, American Academy of Nursing.

== Select publications and works ==
- Changes in Smoking Prevalences Among Health Care Professionals From 2003 to 2010–2011. Sarna L, Bialous SA, Nandy K, Antonio AL, & Yang Q. (2014). JAMA. 311 (2):197-199. doi: 10.1001/jama.2013.284871. PubMed PMID 24399560. Changes in Smoking Prevalences Among Health Care Professionals From 2003 to 2010-2011
- Nurses' Attitudes toward Intervening with Smokers: Their Knowledge, Opinion and E-Learning Impact. Králíková E, Felbrová V, Kulovaná S, Malá K, Nohavová I, Roubíčková E, Pánková A, Bialous SA, Wells MJ, Brook J, Sarna L. (2016) Central European Journal of Public Health. 2016 Dec;24(4):272-275. doi: 10.21101/cejph.a4652. Nurses' Attitudes toward Intervening with Smokers: Their Knowledge, Opinion and E-Learning Impact. - PubMed - NCBI
- Nursing practice, research and education in the West. The best is yet to come. Young H, Bakewell-Sacks B, Sarna L (2017). Nursing Research. 66(2); 61–62. Nursing Practice, Research and Education in the West: The Best Is Yet to Come. - PubMed - NCBI
- Lung cancer and tobacco: What is new? Nursing Clinics of North America. Bialous SA & Sarna L (2017). 52:53-63 Lung Cancer and Tobacco: What Is New?
- Tobacco Use in Cancer Clinical Trials: Research Priorities, Recommended Measures, and Assessment Protocol. Land SR, Warren GW, Moinpour JS, Ostroff JS, Crafts J, Folz JL, Gulley E, Szabo E, Chollette V, Brandon TH, Duffy S, Hatsukami DK, Dresler ER, Gritz ER, Schnoll R, Sarna L, Rigotti N, Buckner JC, Mitchell SA, & Toll B. Clinical Cancer Research (2016). Research Priorities, Measures, and Recommendations for Assessment of Tobacco Use in Clinical Cancer Research
- Helping Smokers Quit: Behaviors and Attitudes of Chinese Registered Nurses. Sarna L, Bialous SA, Zou XN, Wang W, Hong JF, Chan SS, Wells M, & Brook J. Journal of Advanced Nursing (2016). Sep 28. doi: 10.1111/jan.12811. Helping smokers quit: behaviours and attitudes of Chinese Registered Nurses
- Supportive care in lung cancer: milestones over the past 40 years. Molassiotis A, Uyterlinde W, Hollen PJ, Sarna L, Palmer P, Krishnasamy M. (2015). Journal of Thoracic Oncology. 10(1):10-18. doi: 10.1097/JTO.0000000000000407. PubMed PMID 25325780. Supportive care in lung cancer: milestones over the past 40 years Supportive Care in Lung Cancer: Milestones Over the Past 40 Years
- Making a difference: Nursing scholarship and leadership in tobacco control. Sarna L, Bialous, SA, Chan SS, Hollen P, & O'Connell KA (2012). 61(1): 31–42. doi: 10.1016/j.outlook.2012.05.007. Nursing Outlook. PubMed PMID 22819635. Making a difference: Nursing scholarship and leadership in tobacco control
- Nurses' treatment of tobacco dependence in hospitalized smokers in three states. Sarna L, Bialous S, Ong M, Wells M, Kotlerman J. (2012). Research in Nursing & Health, 35, 250–264. Nurses' treatment of tobacco dependence in hospitalized smokers in three states. - PubMed - NCBI
- Quality of life supersedes the classic prognosticators for long-term survival in locally advanced non-small-cell lung cancer: an analysis of RTOG 9801. Movsas B, Moughan J, Sarna L, Langer C, Werner-Wasik M, Nicolaou N, Komaki R, Machtay M, Wasserman T,& Bruner DW. Journal of Clinical Oncology. 1;27(34):5816-22 (2009). PMID 19858383. Quality of life supersedes the classic prognosticators for long-term survival in locally advanced non-small-cell lung cancer: an analysis of RTOG 9... - PubMed - NCBI
- Smoking cessation is challenging even for patients recovering from lung cancer surgery with curative intent. Cooley ME, Sarna L, Kotlerman J, Lukanich JM, Jaklitsch M, Green SB, & Bueno R. (2009). Lung Cancer. 66(2):218-25. PMID 19321223. Smoking cessation is challenging even for patients recovering from lung cancer surgery with curative intent
- Tobacco control curricula content in baccalaureate nursing programs in four Asian nations. Sarna L, Danao LL, Chan SS, Shin SR, Baldago LA, Endo E, Minegishi H, & Wewers ME (2006). Nursing Outlook; 54(6):334-44. PMID 17142152 Tobacco control curricula content in baccalaureate nursing programs in four Asian nations
- Health behaviors of lung cancer survivors. Evangelista L, Sarna L, Padilla G, & Brecht L. (2003) Heart & Lung. 32: 131–139. Health perceptions and risk behaviors of lung cancer survivors
- The aftermath of lung cancer. Maliski S, Sarna L, Evangelista L, & Padilla G (2003) Cancer Nursing. The aftermath of lung cancer: balancing the good and bad. - PubMed - NCBI
- Impact of respiratory symptoms and pulmonary function on quality of life of long-term survivors of non-small cell lung cancer. Sarna L, Evangelista L, Tashkin D, Padilla G, Holmes C, Brecht ML, & Grannis F. (2003). Chest.;125(2):439-45. PMID 14769722 Impact of respiratory symptoms and pulmonary function on quality of life of long-term survivors of non-small cell lung cancer. - PubMed - NCBI
- Quality of life of disease-free survivors of non-small cell lung cancer. Sarna, L., Padilla G, Holmes C, & Tashkin, D. (2002) Journal of Clinical Oncology. 13: 290-2929. Quality of life of long-term survivors of non-small-cell lung cancer. - PubMed - NCBI
