= Norwegian Health Economics Administration =

Helfo
Government agency overview
- Formed: January 1, 2009
- Employees: 430
- Government agency executive: Øistein Brinck, Director
- Parent department: Norwegian Directorate for Health and Social Affairs
- Website: helfo.no

The Norwegian Health Economics Administration (originally Helseøkonomiforvaltningen and now commonly known by its Norwegian acronym Helfo) is the Norwegian Directorate for Health and Social Affairs external agency, and annually administers around NOK 50 billion. Helfo's responsibilities include making payments from the National Insurance scheme to healthcare providers, suppliers and service providers, as well as individual refunds of expenses incurred by private individuals relating to medicines, dental healthcare and health services abroad. Helfo's societal mission is to safeguard the rights of stakeholders in the health sector and private individuals and to provide information and guidance concerning health services.

== Societal Mission ==
- Helfo's societal mission and remit is to safeguard the rights of healthcare users and provide professional services to healthcare providers and citizens through the provision of guidance and information concerning health services.
- Helfo administers rights granted under Chapter 5 of the National Insurance Act (support linked to healthcare services), contributes to compliance and ensures that patient rights are upheld.
- Case processing, controls and support payments must be carried out in accordance with the relevant financial regulations and other provisions applicable to the public sector.
- Through the knowledge and experience that is being built up within the organisation, Helfo contributes to insight into the functioning of the welfare system and the further development of the service areas.

== Helfo for private citizens ==
Helfo can assist you with a number of health related services, amongst other to find or change your regular GP, order European Health Insurance Card and reimbursement of medical expenses. If you are a private citizen, you will find information about all of Helfos services towards the public in Norwegian at helsenorge.no.

Read more in English at helfo.no

== European Health Insurance Card (EHIC) ==
If you are a member of the Norwegian National Insurance Scheme and are staying temporarily in another EEA country or in Switzerland, you should carry a European Health Insurance Card (Europeisk helsetrygdkort). You can get information and order the card at helsenorge.no, or by calling 23 32 70 00 (Veiledning helsenorge.no). Please be advised that not all members of the Norwegian National Insurance scheme are entitled to the European Health Insurance card.

To be entitled to a European health insurance card, the primary condition is that one is a member of the Norwegian National Insurance scheme, and that the person is a Norwegian citizen or a citizen of another EU/EEA country or Switzerland. The European health insurance card is a plastic card the size of a regular bank card. The scheme also covers family members, i.e. spouses and children under the age of 25. They are entitled to European health insurance cards regardless of citizenship and of whether they are members of the National Insurance scheme. Each family member must carry their own European health insurance card. The insurance card is issued for three years, provided that conditions are still met.

== Patient charges and exemption card ==
You are entitled to a healthcare exemption card (Frikort) once you have paid a certain amount in user fees when receiving healthcare services. When you present your exemption card, you do not have to pay user fees for the remainder of the calendar year. There are two exemption card schemes for health care services. You can get an overview of your registered user fees in the self-service solution "Mine egenandeler" at helsenorge.no. (Login required.)

Members of the Norwegian National Insurance scheme, only pay a fixed part of the cost of public health services, called patient charges. This applies to medical treatment, buying medicines on a refundable prescription, physiotherapy, seeing a psychologist and travel expenses to consultations and treatment appointments. If a person has paid a certain amount in patient charges, he or she is eligible for an exemption card. This means he or she is exempt from paying patient charges for the rest of the calendar year. There are two types of exemption cards. The amounts are set annually by the Norwegian parliament, the Storting.

The exemption card for user fee group 1 covers approved patient charges paid to doctors, psychologists and outpatient clinics and for x-rays, patient travel and blue prescription medicine and equipment. The exemption card for user fee 2 covers approved patient charges paid for physiotherapy, certain dental diseases, approved rehabilitation institutions and travel for treatment abroad organised by Oslo University Hospital – Rikshospitalet HF.

== See also ==
- General practitioner
