= Afaf Meleis =

Egyptian-American nurse-scientist, researcher and medical sociologist

Afaf Ibrahim Meleis (born 1942) is an Egyptian-American nurse-scientist, researcher, and medical sociologist. She is a Professor of Nursing and Sociology and Dean Emerita at the University of Pennsylvania, where she served from 2002 through 2014. This followed her 34-year tenure as a nursing faculty professor at the University of California, Los Angeles (UCLA) and the University of California, San Francisco (UCSF).

== Early life and education ==
Meleis was born and raised in Alexandria, Egypt. Her mother was a prominent nurse in Egypt, having been the first nurse to earn MPH and PhD degrees at an Egyptian university. Her mother went on to establish undergraduate and graduate nursing programs at several Egyptian universities (including Alexandria University), numerous post-high school nursing educational programs around the Persian Gulf, and her own clinic as a nurse-midwife. Meleis has recounted that her mother’s work ethic and passion for nursing, as well as listening to the life experiences of the patients at the clinic from a young age, were instrumental in shaping her own career trajectory.

Meleis graduated with a Bachelor of Science in Nursing magna cum laude from Alexandria University in 1961. She then came to the US as a Rockefeller Foundation Fellow to advance her education, earning a Master of Science in Nursing (1964), a Master of Arts in Sociology (1966) and a Doctor of Philosophy degree in Medical and Social Psychology (1968) from UCLA. She was engaged to Mahmoud Meleis when she left Egypt, and after two years apart, convinced Egyptian President Gamal Abdel Nasser to allow him to join her in the United States. They both completed their PhDs at UCLA, Mahmoud’s in nuclear engineering, before moving together to San Francisco.

== Career ==
Meleis is an expert on women and immigrant healthcare, global health, Transitions Theory, and nursing knowledge. She joined the Board of Directors of the International Council on Women’s Health Issues (ICOWHI) in 1998 and was elected President of ICOWHI in 2000. Though she has since stepped down from the position, she continued as an active member, representative during Congresses (Botswana in 2008, Australia in 2006, and Brazil in 2015), and contributor to published news updates for decades following.

=== University of California, San Francisco ===
Meleis worked as an assistant professor at the UCLA School of Nursing from 1968 to 1971. After moving to San Francisco in 1971, she became assistant dean at the UCSF School of Nursing. She then assumed the role of full professor in 1980 and continued to serve there until 2001. From 1975 to 1977, she worked with the Kuwait Ministry of Education and the University of Kuwait School of Medicine to help establish their Health Institute, a precursor to their Nursing program established in 1982. (This nursing program has since been incorporated into their College of Health Sciences.)

In Kuwait, Meleis was surrounded by global communities and cultures, and she began forming research questions about immigration, transitions of immigration, and their impacts on healthcare experiences, with a focus on vulnerable women. This served as the foundation for her and her team's development of Transitions Theory, a framework for understanding the experiences, responses, and consequences of change for patients, families, communities, and organizations.

=== University of Pennsylvania ===
After 34 years at the University of California, Meleis led the University of Pennsylvania School of Nursing from 2002 to 2014, serving as the Margaret Bond Simon Dean of Nursing and Director of the School's WHO Collaborating Center for Nursing and Midwifery Leadership. She returned to the faculty as a Professor of Nursing and Sociology in 2014 before formally retiring in 2016.

Known as the “Energizer Dean” by her colleagues, Meleis led a $109.3 million fundraising campaign, which went toward expansive initiatives and goals in the School of Nursing. Under Meleis’s leadership and in collaboration with Mary Naylor and NewCourtland Elder Services, Penn Nursing established the NewCourtland Center for Transitions and Health in 2007. Meleis continued to advance the School by establishing the Center for Global Women’s Health (CGWH) in June 2011. The CGWH is a pioneering research center that contributes to women's health scholarship, education, clinical practice, and leadership on a global level. It officially opened on May 11, 2012.

In 2020, Meleis was named by Carnegie Corporation of New York as an honoree of the Great Immigrants Award

== Selected works ==
Meleis, A. I. (2016). The Undeaning Transition: Toward Becoming a Former Dean. Nursing Outlook. 64 (2), 186-196.

Langer, A., Meleis, A., Knaul, F. M., Atun, R., Aran, M., Arreola-Ornelas, H., ... & Claeson, M. (2015). Women and health: the key for sustainable development. The Lancet, 386(9999), 1165-1210.

Meleis, A.I. (2011). Theoretical nursing: Development and progress (5th Ed.). Philadelphia: Lippincott Williams & Wilkins.

Meleis, A.I., Birch, E., Wachter, S. (Ed.). (2011). Women's Health and the World's Cities. Philadelphia, PA: University of Pennsylvania Press

Bhutta ZA, Chen L, Cohen J, Crisp N, Evans T, Fineberg H, Frenk J, Garcia P, Horton R, Ke Y, Kelley P, Kistnasamy B, Meleis A., Naylor D, Pablos-Mendez A, Reddy S, Scrimshaw S, Sepulveda J, Serwadda D, Zurayk H. (2010). Education of health professionals for the 21st century: a global independent Commission. Lancet, 375(9721):1137-8.

Meleis, A.I. (2010). Transitions Theory: Middle Range and Situation Specific Theories in Research and Practice. New York, NY: Springer Publishing Company.

Meleis, A.I. (2005) Safe womanhood is not safe motherhood: policy implications. Health Care for Women International, 26(6), 464-471.

Meleis, A.I. & Dracup, K. (2005). The Case Against the DNP: History, Timing, Substance, and Marginalization. Online Journal of Issues in Nursing. 10 (3), Manuscript 2:

Meleis, A.I., & Im, E. (2002). Grandmothers and Women's Health: From Fragmentation to Coherence. Health Care for Women International, 23 (2), 207-224.

Meleis, A.I., & Lindgren, T. (2001). Show Me a Woman Who Does Not Work! Journal of Nursing Scholarship, Third Quarter, 33 (3) 209-210.

Meleis, A.I., Sawyer L., Im, E., Schumacher, K., & Messias, D. (2000). Experiencing transitions: An emerging middle range theory. Advances in Nursing Science, 23(1), 12-28.

Meleis, A.I. (1998). Revisions in knowledge development: A passion for substance. Scholarly Inquiry for Nursing Practice: An International Journal, 12(1), 65-77.

Meleis, A.I. (1997). Immigrant transitions and health care: An action plan. Nursing Outlook, 45(1), p. 42.

Meleis, A.I., Messias, D.K.H., & Arruda, E.N. (1996). Women's work environment and health: Clerical workers in Brazil. Research in Nursing and Health, 19, 53-62.

Meleis, A.I. (1996). Culturally competent scholarship: Substance and rigor. Advances in Nursing Science, 19(2), 1-16.

Meleis, A.I. Hall, J. M., & Stevens, P.E. (1994). Scholarly caring in doctoral nursing education: Promoting diversity and collaborative mentorship. Image: Journal of Nursing Scholarship, 26(3), 177-180.

Meleis, A.I., & Trangenstein, P.A. (1994). Facilitating transitions: Redefinition of a nursing mission. Nursing Outlook, 42(6), 255-259.
