= Erling Valvik =

Norwegian civil servant (born 1953)

Erling Valvik (born 1953) is a Norwegian civil servant.

He hails from Bergen, and after studies in economics, law and public administration at the University of Bergen he graduated with the cand. polit. degree. After some years as a Norad official in Namibia and civil servant in Tromsø he was hired as a financial consultant in Kristiansand municipality in 1982. In 1990 he advanced to chief administrative officer, a position he held until 2002. In 2000, Kristiansand municipality sold stocks in the power company Agder Energi, and 1.7 billion kr of the sales fee were funneled to a new cultural foundation, Cultiva. As chief administrative officer Valvik was one of the architects behind the foundation, together with prominent local politicians such as Bjarne Ugland and Tore Austad. In 2002, Valvik applied for the job as managing director of Cultiva, and was hired after edging out 54 other applicants.

In early February 2004, Valvik was selected as chairman of the Southern Norway Regional Health Authority. An entirely new board was composed, after the Minister of Health Dagfinn Høybråten relieved the old board of their positions. The board had split over the proposed removal of chief executive Steinar Stokke. With the new board in place, Stokke resigned after less than two weeks. Valvik remained chairman until 2006, when a new policy was decided to select active politicians as board members to a larger degree. In 2009, Valvik became deputy board member of Tromsø municipality's cultural foundation Intro. In 2011 he applied for the position as County Governor of Sogn og Fjordane, but was not appointed.

Civic offices
Preceded by Oluf Arntsen	Chair of the Southern Norway Regional Health Authority; 2004–2006	Succeeded by Anne Cathrine Frøstrup
