= Bjarne Ugland =

Norwegian politician (born 1946)

Bjarne Ugland (born 1946) is a Norwegian politician for the Labour Party.

Hailing from Vågsbygd, he was originally a member of the Liberal Party, but shifted to the Labour Party in the 1980s. He entered Kristiansand city council after the 1999 local elections, became leader of Labour's party group and served the next term 2003–2007 as deputy mayor. He was described as a typical municipal politician, forging pragmatic cross-party alliances to further the city's progress. Ugland thus became a central figure behind the scenes in the workings of Norway's sixth largest municipality.

In 2003, after Ugland had propped up Jan Oddvar Skisland to become mayor, he was noted nationwide as a proponent of closer relations between Labour and the Christian Democratic Party. Also, together with Conservative group leader in the city, Tore Austad and chief administrative officer Erling Valvik, Ugland was also a central architect behind Kristiansand municipality's 2000 sale of the power company Agder Energi, and subsequent establishment of the cultural foundation Cultiva. Ugland remained member of the working committee and strategy committee of Agder Energi.

After retiring from politics, Ugland served as chair and deputy chair of Kristiansand Næringsselskap, board member of the Kilden Performing Arts Centre and project leader in a local Tall Ships' Races event. He has also been a board member of the recycling company Returkraft.
