= Anne Kari Lande Hasle =

Norwegian civil servant (born 1946)

Anne Kari Lande Hasle (born 4 January 1946) is a Norwegian civil servant.

She is born in Oslo, but grew up in Bergen. In 1957, she moved to Nøtterøy. She finished her secondary education in Tønsberg in 1964. After brief studies at the University of Oslo, she graduated as a socionom at Norges kommunal- og sosialhøyskole in 1970. After a period as a social worker, she was hired in the Ministry of Social Affairs in 1971. In 1977 she was hired as a consultant in the Ministry of Consumer Affairs and Administration. She was promoted to assistant secretary there in 1980. After a tenure as a Ministry of Justice and the Police, she became a special adviser on illegal drug trade policy from 1982 to 1983. Afterwards, she returned to the Ministry of Consumer Affairs and Administration as deputy under-secretary of state.

In 1991 she became permanent under-secretary of state, the highest-ranking civil servant in a ministry, in the Ministry of Children and Family Affairs (the new name of the Ministry of Consumer Affairs). She was the second woman - after Karin M. Bruzelius - to be appointed permanent under-secretary of state in the Norwegian civil service. She was a member of the Norwegian delegation for negotiating Norway's membership in the EU from 1992 to 1994. She served as the first director of Norwegian Social Research (NOVA) from 1996 to 1999. In 1999, she was appointed permanent under-secretary of state in the Ministry of Health and Social Affairs. She stepped down in October 2012.

Lande Hasle has been a board member of Oslo Labour Party, and was vice president of the Norwegian Association for Women's Rights from 1978 to 1982.

In research she has been a board member of the Norwegian Research Centre in Organization and Management, the Norwegian Computing Center (chair 1992–1993), the NAVF branch for women's affairs research, BI Norwegian Business School and the Norwegian Institute for Social Research and a council member of Noras. She has chaired Nordisk Administrativt Forbund and Tyrikollektivet.

She is married to a rector and resides in Oslo.

Civic offices
Preceded by Bjørn Larsen (Ministry of Family and Consumer Affairs)	Permanent under-secretary of state in the Ministry of Children and Family Affairs; 1991–1996	Succeeded by Harald Nybøen
Preceded by Steinar Stokke	Permanent under-secretary of state in the Ministry of Health and Care Services; 1999–2012	Succeeded by Bjørn-Inge Larsen
