= UCLA School of Nursing =

Public college in Los Angeles, California

Coordinates: 34.066779°N 118.441974°W

- Motto: Nursing Reimagined. Nursing Redefined.
- Type: Public
- Established: 1949
- Parent institution: University of California, Los Angeles
- Dean: Lin Zhan, PhD, RN, FAAN
- Location: Los Angeles, California, United States
- Website: www.nursing.ucla.edu

The UCLA School of Nursing is a nursing school affiliated with UCLA, and is located in the Westwood neighborhood of Los Angeles, California. The school is housed in the Doris and Louis Factor Health Sciences Building, known as the Factor Building, on the south end of UCLA's 400-plus-acre campus, adjacent to the Ronald Reagan UCLA Medical Center.

The school is consistently named to U.S. News & World Report's Top Nursing Schools list, ranking the master's program 16th and the baccalaureate program among the top 10 in 2021–22. It is also one of the country's highest research-funded schools, ranking in the top 20 among nursing schools in grant funding from the National Institute of Health.

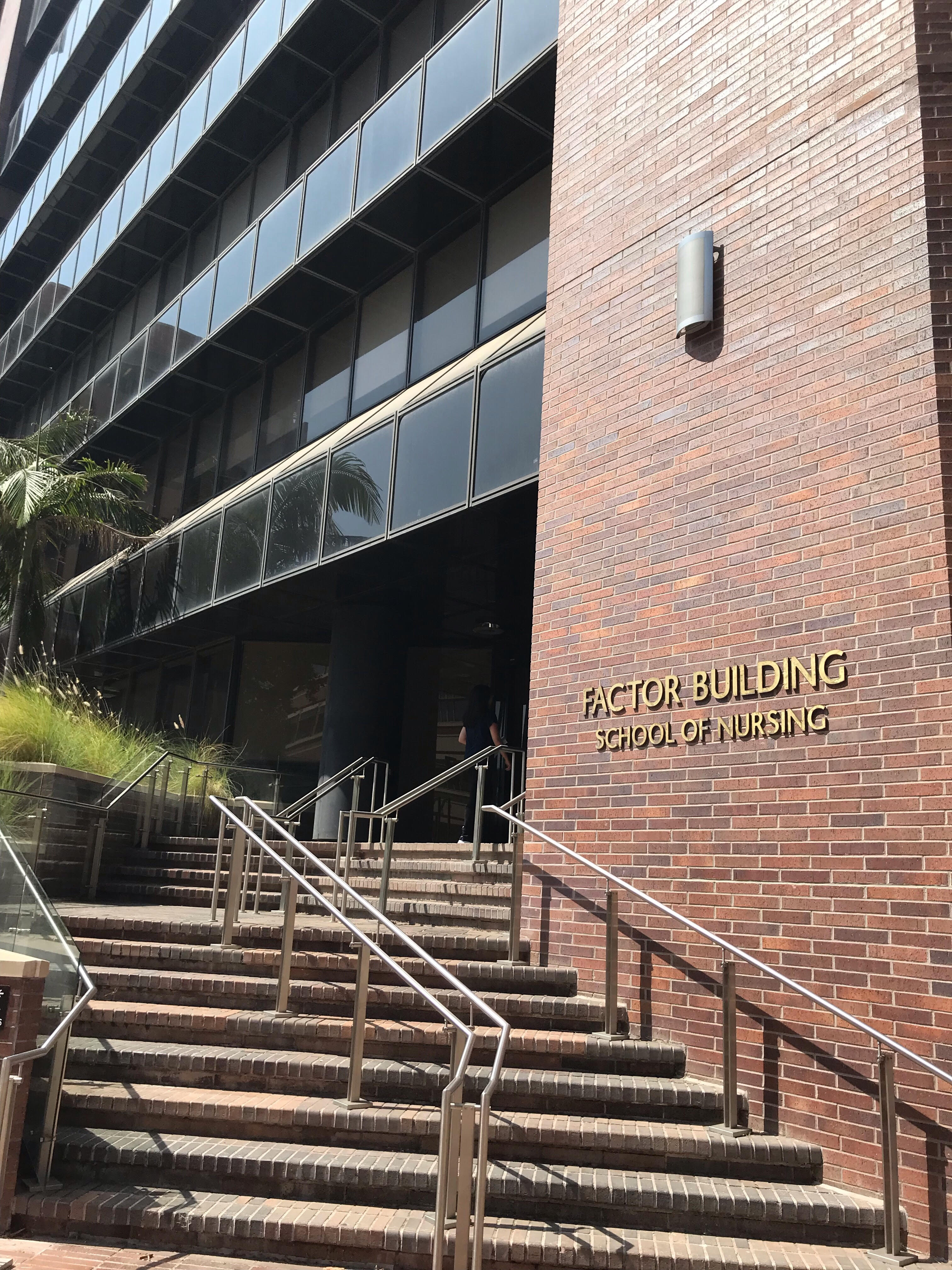
The UCLA School Nursing is located in the Factor Building at 700 Tiverton Ave., Los Angeles, CA 90005, on campus near the hospital and school of medicine. The building opened April 9, 1981. (photo: R.Kanoff)

== History ==
=== Early Nursing Education at UCLA ===
UCLA, a public research university in Los Angeles, was founded in 1919.

Nursing education at UCLA dates back to 1929. In the early days, registered nurses received certificates in public health offered through university extension courses.

In 1932 a group of public health nurses advocated for a Department of Nursing Education to be established in the College of Letters and Science. Dr. Elinore Beebe, RN, PhD, recruited from Yale, became the first director of the UCLA Public Health Nursing program under the Department of Bacteriology in 1937.

The 1940s was a time of reorganization and growth for the program. The Bachelor of Science degree was established within a new College of Applied Arts. In 1946 the Department of Public Health Nursing became the Department of Nursing, with faculty added to develop courses to prepare nursing supervisors.

=== Establishing a School of Nursing ===
Professor Lulu K. Wolf (later Hassenplug) from Vanderbilt University was recruited to develop a nursing school at UCLA. Wolf had graduated with honors in 1924 from the Army School of Nursing, Walter Reed Hospital, and earned her BS from Columbia University Teachers' College in 1927.

In 1949 the University of California Regents (UC Regents) authorized the School of Nursing as one of the professional schools of the UCLA Centers for the Health Sciences, and Wolf was appointed the school's first dean. This action paved the way in 1950 for the opening of an undergraduate traditional program in nursing leading to the Bachelor of Science (BS) degree and the establishment of a graduate program leading to the Master of Science in Nursing (MSN) the following year. In 1966, the Master of Nursing (MN) degree was established as an alternate option to the MS degree. The MS degree program was discontinued in 1969.

Meanwhile, in the 1960s, the school hosted and participated in international programs with many countries around the world including Columbia, Egypt, Hong Kong, India, and Japan, which led to an increase in the number of international students.

The Regents approved the Doctor of Nursing Science (DNSc) degree program in 1986, and in 1987 the first doctoral students were admitted. In the mid-1990s, the master's degree designation MN was changed to Master of Science in Nursing (MSN), and the doctoral degree designation DNSc was changed to PhD in Nursing.

In 1993 admissions to the bachelor's program was suspended and the last class graduated in 1997. In its place, the Bridge program was introduced to meet the educational needs of students who are registered nurses with associate degrees or diplomas in nursing.

In 2006 the school reinstated a traditional / prelicensure BS program with admission at the freshman level and launched the Master's Entry Clinical Nurse (MECN) / prelicensure program option within the MSN degree program, which is designed for prelicensure students with bachelor's degrees or higher education in another discipline.

The UCLA School of Nursing is approved by the Undergraduate and Graduate Councils of the Academic Senate of the University of California at Los Angeles. In addition, the prelicensure (BS and MECN) and advanced practice master's programs are approved by the California Board of Registered Nursing. In 2011 the Commission on Collegiate Nursing Education (CCNE) accredited the existing bachelor's and master's degree programs for a term of 10 years, the highest that can be granted. UCLA holds Western Association of Schools and Colleges accreditation.

== Academics / Degree Programs ==
The UCLA School of Nursing offers undergraduate, master's, and doctoral programs in nursing. Degree offerings include the Bachelor of Science in Nursing (BS), Master of Science in Nursing (MSN), Doctor of Nursing Practice (DNP), and Doctor of Philosophy (PhD) in Nursing.

The school also offers the Master's Entry Clinical Nurse (MECN) program, an accelerated pathway designed for individuals who hold bachelor's degrees in non-nursing disciplines and seek licensure as registered nurses.

Instruction combines classroom education, simulation-based learning, and clinical training through affiliations with UCLA Health and other healthcare institutions. The school also sponsors research training opportunities for undergraduate and graduate students interested in pursuing careers in nursing science and academic research.

== Research ==
UCLA School of Nursing scholars represent a wide range of disciplines including nursing, medicine, public health, statistics, epidemiology, physiological sciences, and the basic sciences. All are committed to scholarship in the service of improving health, wellness, and quality of life throughout the lifespan. Some examples of faculty research include:

- The impact of heart failure and sleep apnea on brain function
- Screening, prevention, assessment and management of pressure ulcers and wound care
- Cellular targets for Alzheimer's treatments or prevention
- Gene therapy that has high potential to advance the science in HIV/AIDS
- Nutritional strategies to increase fertility
- Cardiovascular impact from hookah smoking

== Rankings ==
Ranked #16 on the U.S. News & World Report Best Grad School Rankings: Best Nursing Schools: Master's and among the top 10 Best Bachelor of Science in Nursing Degrees (for 2021–2022) . Schools are ranked according to their performance across a set of widely accepted indicators of excellence.

NCLEX Pass Rates (for 2017–2018): BSN: 96% MSN: 95%

== Deans ==
- Lulu Wolf Hassenplug (founding dean of the UCLA School of Nursing, retired in 1968)
- Rheba de Tornyay (appointed 1971)
- Mary E. Reres (appointed 1977)
- Ada Lindsey (appointed 1986)
- Marie J. Cowan (1997–2008)
- Courtney Lyder (2008–2015)
- Linda Sarna (2015–2021)
- Lin Zhan (2021–2026)

Barbara Bates-Jensen (interim 2026-)

== Distinguished Alumni and Faculty ==
- Jeanne Quint Benoliel
- Bonnie Bullough
- Linda Burnes Bolton, MN ’72, DrPH
- Kathleen Dracup, MN ’74, PhD
- Kristine M. Gebbie, MSN ’68, DrPH
- Afaf I. Meleis, MS ’64, MA, PhD
- Sister Callista Roy, MN ’75, PhD
- Other UCLA School of Nursing notable alumni

== See also ==
- List of nursing schools in the United States
- American Academy of Nursing
