= Bjørn-Inge Larsen =

Norwegian physician and civil servant (born 1961)

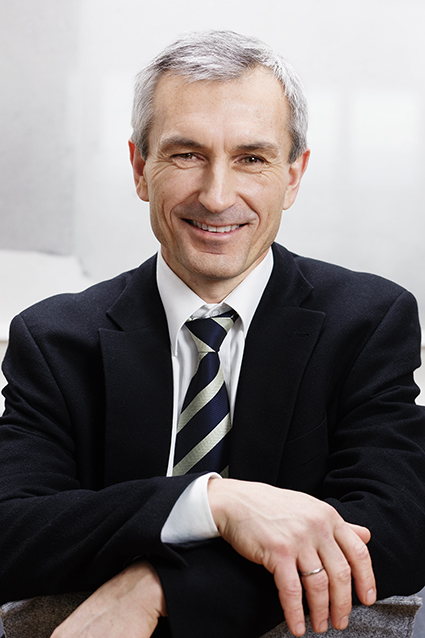
Bjørn-Inge Larsen.

Bjørn-Inge Larsen (born 28 February 1961) is a Norwegian physician and civil servant.

He graduated from the University of Oslo with a cand.med. degree in medicine in 1986. He has also studied business administration at the BI Norwegian Business School and received an MBA and an M.ph after his post graduate studies at the University of California, Berkeley. From 1990 to 2000, Larsen served as the county chief physician in Buskerud, Finnmark and Vestfold. In 2000 he was appointed as deputy director in the Norwegian Board of Health Supervision.

In 2001 he became director of the Norwegian Directorate for Health and Social Affairs. In October 2012, he was named as the new permanent under-secretary of state in the Ministry of Health and Care Services, succeeding Anne Kari Lande Hasle.

Larsen is a member of the executive board of WHO for the period 2010 to 2013. Here he has been one of the strongest advocates of the Global Code of Practice on the International Recruitment of Health Personnel that was adopted by WHO in 2010. This code is a landmark in the international endeavour to reduce the outflow of health personnel from the countries which can afford it least. He has also been actively engaged in the search for sound means to reduce the global incidence of non-communicable diseases.

Civic offices
Preceded by	Director of the Norwegian Directorate for Health and Social Affairs; 2001–2012	Succeeded by Bjørn Guldvog
Preceded by Anne Kari Lande Hasle	Permanent under-secretary of state in the Ministry of Health and Care Services; 2012–2021	Succeeded by Cathrine Marie Lofthus
