= List of county governors of Østfold =

This is a list of the county governors (Fylkesmenn) of Østfold, Norway.

County governors of Østfold
Start	End	Name	Born	Died
1814	1830	Valentin Christian Wilhelm Sibbern	1779	1853
1831	1846	Gregers Winther Wulfsberg	1780	1846
1847	1855	Christian Birch-Reichenwald	1814	1891
1855	1880	Carl Sibbern	1809	1880
1881	1890	Johan Lauritz Rasch	1829	1901
1891	1905	Ulrik Frederik Christian Arneberg	1829	1911
1905	1917	Hans Christian Albert Hansen	1847	1925
1918	1933	Eivind Olaf Bødtker	1863	1946
1933	1940	Ernst Andreas Johannesen	1870	1957
1940	1951	Lyder Bull	1881	1959
1941	1945	Hans S. Jacobsen (under Nazi rule)	1901	1980
1951	1966	Karl Hess Larsen	1900	1966
1966	1981	Jakob Modalsli	1911	1984
1981	1986	Lars Korvald	1916	2006
1986	1998	Erling Norvik	1928	1998
1998	2003	Edvard Grimstad	1933	–
2003	–	Anne Enger Lahnstein	1949	–
2003	–	Lise Beret Sandereid (acting)	–	–
