= Odd With =

Norwegian politician

Governor of Nordland
- In office 1983–1991
- Preceded by: Ole Aavatsmark
- Succeeded by: Åshild Hauan

Personal details
- Born: 16 May 1921 Kjelvik, Norway
- Died: 19 July 2006 (aged 85)
- Citizenship: Norway
- Parents: Carl Henrik Arneberg With (father); Aagot Scherffenberg (mother)
- Education: Cand.jur.
- Alma mater: University of Oslo
- Occupation: Teacher, Lawyer
- Profession: Politician

Odd With (16 May 1921 – 19 July 2006) was a Norwegian politician for the Christian Democratic Party. He served as the County Governor of Nordland county from 1983 until 1991 and was a member of the Parliament of Norway from 1973 to 1985.

== Personal life ==
He was born on 16 May 1921 in the (now-abandoned) village of Kjelvik in Nordkapp Municipality in Finnmark county, Norway. He was the son of bailiff Carl Henrik Arneberg With and wife Aagot (née Scherffenberg), both of whom died in the 1950s. He was the father of Christian Democratic politician Odd Anders With, and grandfather of 2006 Pop Idol victor Aleksander Denstad With. He is the brother of Thor With, the former Bishop of the Diocese of Bjørgvin.

== Education and career ==
He began his career in 1939 as a teacher in Hamarøy Municipality in Nordland county and later he taught in Øksnes Municipality. In 1947 he graduated from the University of Oslo with the cand.jur. degree. Having worked as a secretary for the tax inspector while studying in Oslo, he moved to Troms county in 1948 to work in the county administration. In 1954, he was appointed chief administrative officer (rådmann) in Nord-Rana Municipality. When Nord-Rana Municipality ceased to exist in 1963, he became chief financial officer in its successor municipality, Rana Municipality. He had this job to 1982.

He served as a deputy representative to the Norwegian Parliament from Nordland county during the terms 1961–1965 and 1969–1973. In 1973, he was elected to a regular seat, and he was re-elected in 1977 and 1981 to serve for two more terms. He was engaged in forming health care and social policy.

From 1974 to 1978 he was a member of the central party committee (sentralstyre) from 1969 to 1973 and of the national party board (landsstyre) from 1973 to 1985. From 1983 to 1991 he served as County Governor of Nordland. He then moved to Bærum Municipality, and was a member of the board of the municipal party chapter from 1992 to 1994 and of the county party chapter from 1993 to 1995.

As many politicians, he held board memberships in various organizations, particularly in the Church of Norway where he was active. He was also active in the Norwegian Missionary Society, YMCA, and temperance organizations. He was a member of the board of the Christian newspaper Vårt Land from 1964 to 1984 and of the MF Norwegian School of Theology from 1969 to 1977.

Government offices
Preceded by Ole Aavatsmark	County Governor of Nordland; 1983–1991	Succeeded by Davis Idin Pareli Johansen (acting for Åshild Hauan)
