= Johan Lauritz Rasch =

Norwegian jurist and politician

Johan Lauritz Rasch (1 December 1829 – 5 March 1901) was a Norwegian jurist and politician.

He resided in Frederikshald, where he worked as an attorney and later stipendiary magistrate (byfoged). He was elected to the Norwegian Parliament in 1871 and 1880, representing his city.

When Carl Sibbern died in 1880, Rasch was appointed County Governor of Smaalenenes Amt (today named Østfold). He held the position to 1890, and died in 1891.

Preceded by Carl Sibbern	County Governor of Østfold; 1880–1890	Succeeded by Ulrik Frederik Christian Arneberg
