= Bue Fjermeros =

Norwegian lawyer and politician

Governor of Vest-Agder
- In office 1966–1982
- Preceded by: Lars Evensen
- Succeeded by: Oluf Skarpnes

Governor of Nordland
- In office 1951–1966
- Preceded by: Karl Hess Larsen
- Succeeded by: Ole Aavatsmark

Personal details
- Born: 21 October 1912 Norway
- Died: 11 March 2000 (aged 87) Norway
- Citizenship: Norway
- Education: cand.jur.
- Profession: Politician

Bue Fjermeros (1912–2000) was a Norwegian lawyer and politician. He was the county governor of Nordland from 1951 until 1966 and then county governor of Vest-Agder from 1966 until his retirement in 1982.

Government offices
Preceded by Karl Hess Larsen	County Governor of Nordland; 1951–1966	Succeeded by Ole Aavatsmark
Preceded by Lars Evensen	County Governor of Vest-Agder; 1966–1982	Succeeded by Oluf Skarpnes
