= Tor Espedal =

Norwegian businessperson (1934–2017)

Tor Espedal (8 June 1934 – 25 April 2017) was a Norwegian businessperson.

He was born in Forsand Municipality. He finished his secondary education at Rogaland Public Gymnasium in 1950, graduated from the Norwegian School of Economics with the siv.øk. degree and also took education at the University of Bergen and Harvard University.

After working in the Ministry of Finance and Laerdal Medical he was hired in the Norwegian State Oil Company (Statoil) in 1973. He started as chief financial officer, moved on to other capacities and remained in the leadership of Statoil until 1995, with shorter tenures elsewhere. From 1978 to 1982 he was the chief executive officer of Sandnes Acuderverk; in 1987 he was the acting chief executive officer of Kongsberg Våpenfabrikk for half a year and in 1988 he was appointed to clean up after Statoil's own Mongstad scandal.

Espedal chaired the board of Rikshospitalet from 1989 to 2002. He also chaired Laerdal Medical and Standards Norway and was a board member of the Lillehammer Olympic Organizing Committee and the Norwegian State Railways.

He was the father of Harald Espedal. Tor Espedal died on 25 April 2017, at the age of 82.

Civic offices
Preceded by Else Bugge Fougner	Chair of Rikshospitalet; 1989–2002	Succeeded by Steinar Stokke
Business positions
Preceded by	Chief executive officer of Kongsberg Våpenfabrikk (acting); 1987	Succeeded by
