= Karl Hess Larsen =

Norwegian lawyer and politician

Governor of Østfold
- In office 1951–1966
- Preceded by: Lyder Bull
- Succeeded by: Jakob Modalsli

Governor of Nordland
- In office 1940–1951
- Preceded by: Olaf Amundsen
- Succeeded by: Bue Fjermeros

Personal details
- Born: 3 September 1900 Haugesund, Norway
- Died: 15 June 1966 (aged 65) Norway
- Citizenship: Norway
- Profession: Politician

Karl Hess Larsen (1900–1966) was a Norwegian lawyer and politician. He served as the County Governor of Nordland county from 1940 until 1951, although he was deposed by the Nasjonal Samling government from 1941 to 1945 during the German occupation of Norway. After the war, he was reinstated as governor. In 1951, he was appointed to be the County Governor of Østfold county, a position he held until his death in 1966.

Government offices
Preceded by Olaf Amundsen	County Governor of Nordland; 1940–1951; Temporarily deposed by the Nazi-occupied government 1941–1945; Replaced by Nazi Gov. Per von Hirsch (1941–1942); Replaced by Nazi Gov. Karl Ludvig Nøstvik (1942–1945)	Succeeded by Bue Fjermeros
Preceded by Lyder Bull	County Governor of Østfold; 1951–1966	Succeeded by Jakob Modalsli
