= Ole Aavatsmark =

Norwegian lawyer and politician

Ole Severin Aavatsmark

Governor of Nordland
- In office 1966–1983
- Preceded by: Bue Fjermeros
- Succeeded by: Odd With

Personal details
- Born: 6 March 1918 Namsos, Norway
- Died: 31 March 1983 (aged 65) Bodø, Norway
- Citizenship: Norway
- Spouse: Constance Marie Greiff-Olsen
- Parents: Olav Aavatsmark (father); Jorid Ekker (mother)
- Education: University of Oslo (1941)
- Profession: Politician

Ole Severin Aavatsmark (6 March 1918 – 31 March 1983) was a Norwegian lawyer and politician. He served as the County Governor of Nordland county from 1966 until his death in 1983.

== Personal life ==
Aavatsmark was born on 6 March 1918 in Namsos in Nord-Trøndelag county, Norway. He was the son of Olav Aavatsmark and Jorid Ekker. He was also the grandson of the politician Ole Severin Aavatsmark. In 1943, he married Constance Marie Greiff-Olsen. He died on 31 March 1983 in the town of Bodø in Nordland county, Norway.

== Education and career ==
Aavatsmark took the Examen artium in 1936. He received his Candidate of Law degree from the University of Oslo in 1941. He became a deputy judge in the Alstahaug District Court in 1942. Aavatsmark was a councilor on the Nord-Trøndelag county council from 1946 to 1953. In 1953, he became the county manager for the Nordland county council, and he worked in that role until 1966. In 1966, he was appointed to the position of county governor for the county of Nordland which he held until his death in 1983.

Government offices
Preceded by Bue Fjermeros	County Governor of Nordland; 1966–1983	Succeeded by Odd With
