= Espen Rostrup Nakstad =

Norwegian medical doctor and lawyer

- Born: 1975 (age 50–51)
- Education: University of Oslo
- Occupations: Physician, lawyer author
- Known for: Response to the COVID-19 pandemic

Espen Rostrup Nakstad (born 1975) is a Norwegian physician, lawyer and author from Skjetten who is the current assistant director of the Norwegian Directorate for Health and Social Affairs.

== Medical career ==
Nakstad earned a Doctorate in medicine from the University of Oslo and is specialized in respiratory disease and internal medicine. In 2018 he issued a book on disaster preparedness together with Bjørn Bjelland, Beredskap, kriseledelse og praktisk skadestedsarbeid. He leads the CBRNE Centre at Ullevål Hospital/Oslo University Hospital. Among others, he led Ullevål Hospital's response when a Norwegian citizen affected by the 2014 ebola outbreak was flown home to Norway.

== COVID-19 pandemic ==
During the COVID-19 pandemic, the entire leadership of the Norwegian Directorate of Health was quarantined, and Nakstad was brought in as acting assistant director on 14 March 2020. His Norwegian work title was shortened to "fung.ass." (lit. "funct[ioning] ass[istant] director"), which became a popular moniker when referring to Nakstad on social media. He was praised for his communication skills in several crisis briefings, especially his espousing security and "stoic calmness".

== Personal life ==
A twin, Nakstad lost his twin brother in a helicopter crash in 2014. He is a nephew of Morten Rostrup of the Doctors Without Borders.
