= Schrödingers katt =

Norwegian popular science TV series

- Genre: Factual television
- Country of origin: Norway
- Original language: Norwegian

Production
- Running time: 30 minutes
- Production company: NRK Trøndelag

Original release
- Release: March 8, 1990 – March 17, 2016

Schrödingers katt was a Norwegian TV series about research, popular science and technology aired at NRK1 from 1990 to 2016. The program, named after a quantum mechanics thought experiment by the Austrian physicist Erwin Schrödinger, was produced by NRK Trøndelag and sent from Tyholt.

The program was usually in a magazine format, led by a host. The reports presented and documented news from research, science and technology, with special emphasis on things related to Norway. The main target group was children and young people.

The program won several awards, among them Folkeopplysningsprisen in 2003, the French award for science communication Prix Jules Verne twice and Image de Sciences once.

In 2002, the program was threatened with closure, but was rescued after more than 4000 protest signatures from academics. However, in 2016 the series was discontinued.

== Audience ==
In 2009, the series had an average audience of 521,000, with a market share of 38 percent.

== Program hosts ==
- Solveig Hareide (2015-)
- Eldrid Borgan (2012–2015)
- Per Olav Alvestad (2012–2015)
- Hanne Kari Fossum (2008–2011)
- Eivind Grimsby Haarr (2005–2008)
- Gry Beate Molvær (2000-04, 2005)
- Synnøve Nes (2004)
- Eiliv Flakne (2000)
- Kari Hustad (1999)
- Gunn Kristin Sande (1998)
- Kirsti Moe (1997)
- Synnøve Farstad (1992–1997)
