= Hans Christian Albert Hansen =

Norwegian politician (1847–1925)

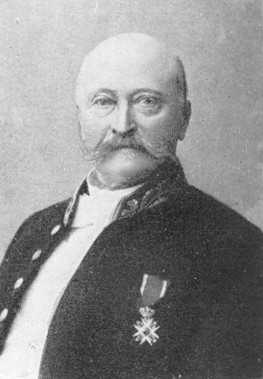
Hans Christian Albert Hansen

Hans Christian Albert Hansen (26 December 1847 – 4 August 1925) was a Norwegian politician for the Conservative Party. He was Minister of Labour from 1903 to 1905.

== Biography ==
He was born in Fredrikshald (now Halden), studied in Stockholm and graduated in engineering in 1868. From 1868 to 1874 he worked as an engineer in Sweden, overseeing the construction of canals, railroad and roads. From 1874 to 1878 he worked with railroads in Norway: Trondhjem–Størenbanen and Smaalensbanen. In 1878 he was hired as county engineer of Buskeruds Amt (now Buskerud).

He became a member of the city council in Drammen, and was elected to the Norwegian Parliament in 1900, representing the urban constituency Drammen. He was later re-elected on one occasion. In October 1903, when the Francis Hagerup second cabinet assumed office, Hansen was appointed Minister of Labour. He held this position until the Hagerup cabinet withdrew on 10 March 1903, due to the prelude to the dissolution of the union between Norway and Sweden.

After this he was appointed County Governor of Smaalenenes Amt (today named Østfold). He held the position until 1917.

Preceded by Jørgen Løvland	Norwegian Minister of Labour; 1903–1905	Succeeded by Kristofer Lehmkuhl
Preceded by Ulrik Frederik Christian Arneberg	County Governor of Østfold; 1905–1917	Succeeded by Eivind Olaf Bødtke
