= Folkeopplysningsprisen =

- Description: Efforts toward democratization of knowledge, humanism, and community education
- Country: Norway
- Presented by: Norwegian Association for Adult Learning (NAAL)
- Status: Active
- Website: www.vof.no

Folkeopplysningsprisen is a Norwegian prize awarded annually by Voksenopplæringsforbundet, the Norwegian Association for Adult Learning (NAAL), since 1998, in connection with the "Education days for adults", formerly "Week of Adult Learning".

According to the statutes, the prize is awarded to "individuals, groups, organizations or institutions for efforts beyond the ordinary, over time, to create conditions and incentives for emancipation, cooperation, growth and development through knowledge. Efforts should be founded on humanistic grounds. The purpose of the prize is to encourage democratization of knowledge, communication of knowledge, and to increase opportunities for participation and interaction, reflection and the use of one's own personal experience.

== Background and Etymology ==
The Scandinavian term folkeopplysning (Danish/Norwegian) consists of folk ("people") and opplysning ("enlightenment"). Together with the Swedish synonym folkbildning, it can be considered close to the concepts of popular education, liberal education, and community education. The learning ideal is rooted in the thoughts of the Age of Enlightenment and Rousseau's concept of popular sovereignty. It is often traced back to N. F. S. Grundtvig's folk high school movement in Denmark in the 1840s and the use of study circles in Swedish labour- and temperance movements in the very beginning of the 20th century (1902). The connection to democratic ideas is considered important in folkeopplysning, with enlightenment taken as a foundation for democracy.

== Winners ==
Although it is not a clear requirement of the award's statutes, all the award winners to date have been Norwegian people or institutions. Among those who have gained the award are the Norwegian Federation of the Blue Cross, a TV programme on popular science, the Norwegian paleontologist Jørn Hurum and, in 2011, Wikimedia Norway.

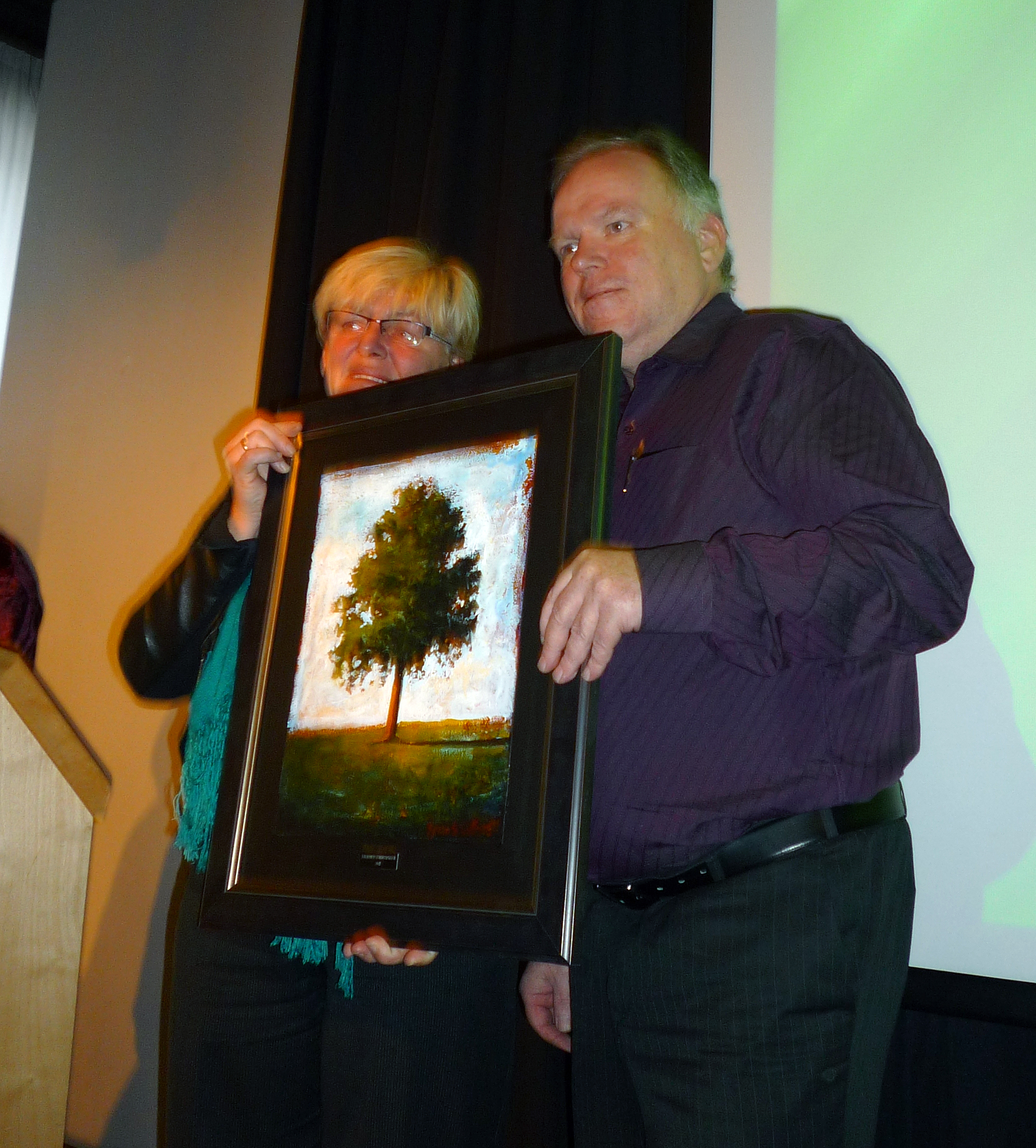
Folkeopplysningsprisen 2011 awarded to Wikimedia Norway.

- 1998: The radio channel NRK P2
- 1999: The folk high school Svanvik Folkehøgskole
- 2000: The workers' enlightenment association in Sarpsborg
- 2001: The study centre in Sjåk
- 2002: Norwegian Federation of the Blue Cross
- 2003: The popular science TV program Schrödingers katt (named after the thought experiment "Schrödinger's cat")
- 2004: Einfrid Halvorsen
- 2005: The Ryfylke Museum and Lucky Næroset
- 2006: The breastfeeding helper organization Ammehjelpen
- 2007: The organization Leser søker bok (Reader seeks book)
- 2008: Jon G. Olsen
- 2009: Jørn H. Hurum
- 2010: Hildur Roll-Hansen
- 2011: Wikimedia Norge
- 2012: Seniornett Norge
