= Olaf Amundsen =

Norwegian lawyer and politician

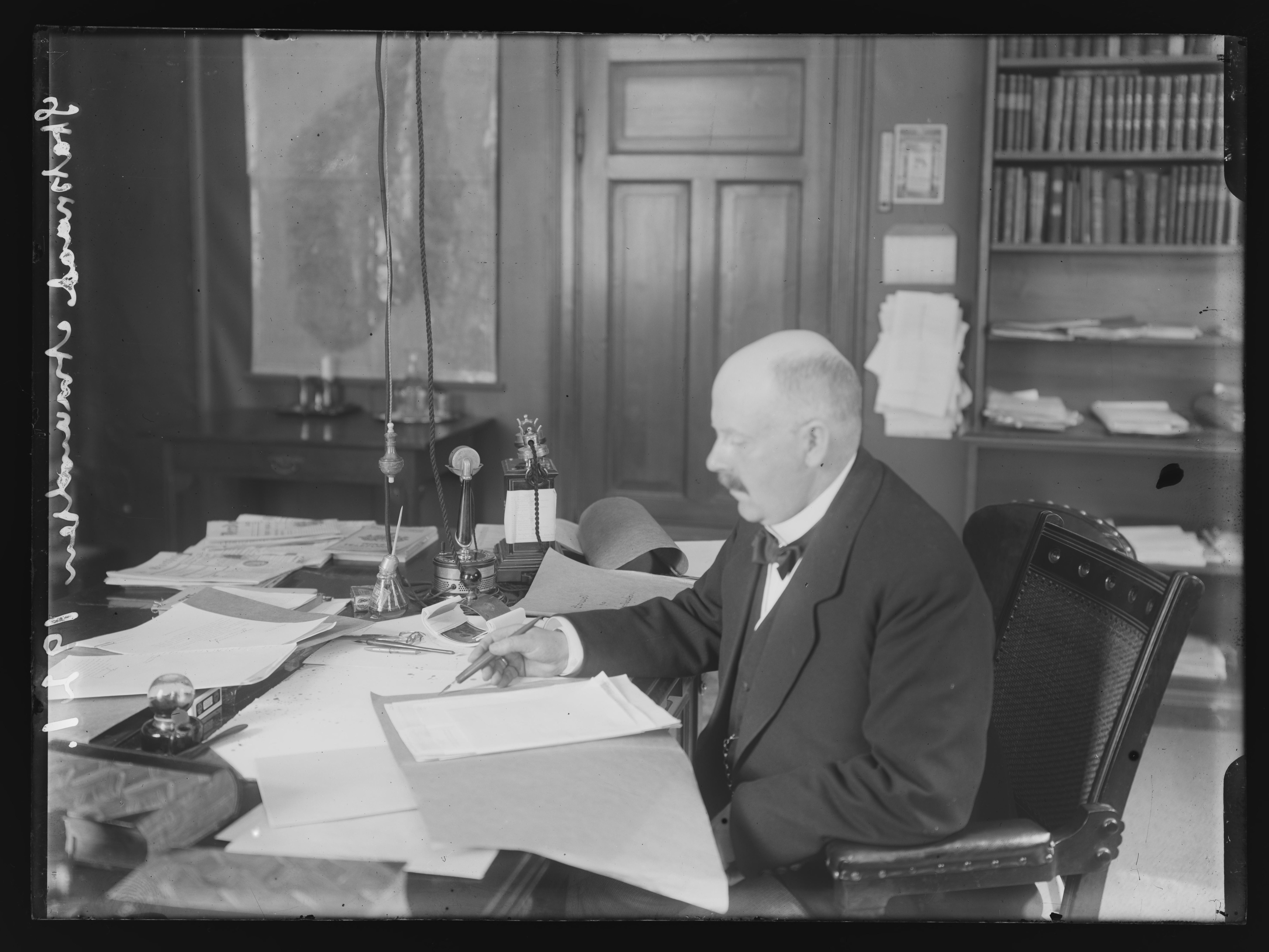

County Governor of Nordland
- In office 24 August 1922 – 12 December 1939
- Prime Minister: Otto Blehr; Otto B. Halvorsen; Abraham Berge; J. L. Mowinckel; Christopher Hornsrud; Peder Kolstad; Jens Hundseid; Johan Nygaardsvold
- Preceded by: Jonas Pedersen
- Succeeded by: Karl Hess Larsen

Minister of Justice
- In office 22 June 1921 – 24 August 1922
- Prime Minister: Otto Blehr
- Preceded by: Otto B. Halvorsen
- Succeeded by: Arnold Holmboe

Personal details
- Born: 13 May 1876 Tromsø, Troms, Sweden-Norway
- Died: 12 December 1939 (aged 63) Norway
- Party: Liberal
- Profession: Politician

Olaf Amundsen (13 May 1876–12 December 1939) was a Norwegian lawyer and politician for the Liberal Party.

Amundsen was elected to the Parliament of Norway for the parliamentary terms 1910-1912 and 1913–1918. From 1918–1921, he was a Sorenskriver, the leader of the Fosen District Court in Trøndelag. He then became the Minister of Justice in the second government of Otto Blehr. The government was in office from 1921 to 1923, but Amundsen resigned from his post on 24 August 1922 when he was named County Governor of Nordland County. He held the governorship until his death in 1939.

Government offices
Preceded by Otto Bahr Halvorsen	Norwegian Minister of Justice; 1921–1922	Succeeded by Arnold Holmboe
Preceded by Jonas Pedersen	County Governor of Nordland; 1922–1939	Succeeded by Karl Hess Larsen
