= Harald Espedal =

Norwegian businessperson (born 1972)

- Born: 4 March 1972 (age 54); Stavanger
- Education: Norwegian School of Economics
- Occupation: businessperson

Harald Espedal (born 4 March 1972) is a Norwegian businessperson.

== Life and career ==
Harald Espedal is the son of Tor Espedal and stood out in his early teenage years as a stock trade prodigy. He was born in Stavanger, graduated from the Norwegian School of Economics in 1996, and spent his early career in SR-Bank, Vesta Forsikring, and Arthur Andersen's Stavanger branch.

He was the chief executive officer of Skagenfondene from 2002 to 2014, has chaired the board of Lyse Energi, Sandnes Sparebank, and Espedal & Co, deputy chair of the Oslo Stock Exchange and Stavanger Concert Hall, and has been a board member of Aspelin Ramm and the Norwegian National Opera and Ballet. He has also invested heavily in Viking FK.
