= Oluf Arntsen =

Norwegian businessperson and politician

Oluf Arntsen (born 22 March 1941) is a Norwegian businessperson and politician for the Christian Democratic Party.

He was born in Kristiansand and graduated from the University of Oslo with the cand.real. degree in 1967. He worked as a consultant in the Ministry of Education and Church Affairs and at a teachers' college before being assisting chief executive at NKI-skolen. During Korvald's Cabinet from 1972 to 1973, he was a State Secretary, first in the Ministry of Local Government and Labour, then in the Office of the Prime Minister. After that he held another political position, secretary-general of the Christian Democratic Party, before he was director of enterprise in Vestfold County Municipality. He was then a director in Anders Jahre/Kosmos from 1982 to 1988, before being hired as chief executive officer of Sparebanken Pluss. He retired in 2001 and was replaced by Stein A. Hannevik.

He has been chairman of the Norwegian Banks' Guarantee Fund, the Norwegian Industrial and Regional Development Fund, Mediehuset Vårt Land as well as the corporate council and election committee of Statoil. In late December 2002 he became chairman of the Southern Norway Regional Health Authority. His tenure was marked by turbulence. The chief executive Steinar Stokke had to step down from several hospital boards in May 2003 because of a flawed project where patient diagnoses was to be coded in different ways to be eligible for public funding. In January 2004, Arntsen tried to oust Stokke from the executive chair, following the "coding case" as well as roundhanded pension deals with company executives. Arntsen was supported by deputy chair Helen Bjørnøy and board member Ole Johan Sandvand, but was voted down by the rest of the board (Kaare Norum, Einfrid Halvorsen, Anne Mo Grimdalen, Terje Keyn, Morten Falkenberg and Svein Øverland). Arntsen subsequently had to resign, but in response, the Minister of Health Dagfinn Høybråten promptly relieved the entire board of their positions. Stokke resigned the next month.

Arntsen is also a former supervisory council member of Christiania Bank og Kreditkasse, and has led the political-financial committee of the Norwegian Savings Banks Association. In 1999 he led the Arntsen Committee which drew out the principles for that year's central wage negotiations in Norway. From 2005 to 2007 he led a new committee, which reviewed the disability pension and delivered the Norwegian Official Report 2007: 4.

He resides in Kristiansand, and is a freemason. While living and working in Eastern Norway, he was a member of Asker municipal council and Akershus county council.
