= Oluf Skarpnes =

Norwegian jurist and public servant (1932–2019)

Governor of Vest-Agder
- In office 1982–1998
- Preceded by: Bue Fjermeros
- Succeeded by: Ann-Kristin Olsen

Personal details
- Born: 26 December 1932 Smøla, Norway
- Died: 29 December 2019 (aged 87) Bærum, Norway
- Citizenship: Norway
- Education: Cand.jur.
- Profession: Politician

Oluf Skarpnes (26 December 1932 - 29 December 2019) was a Norwegian jurist and public servant.

He was born in Smøla. Holding the cand.jur. degree, he was appointed in the Norwegian Ministry of Justice in 1963. In 1980 he became deputy under-secretary of state. From 1982 to 1998 he was the County Governor of Vest-Agder county. He was also the chair of the Skarpnes commission. He died on 29 December 2019 in Bærum Municipality, Norway.

Government offices
Preceded by Bue Fjermeros	County Governor of Vest-Agder; 1982–1998	Succeeded by Ann-Kristin Olsen
