= Bjørn Guldvog =

Norwegian physician and civil servant (born 1958)

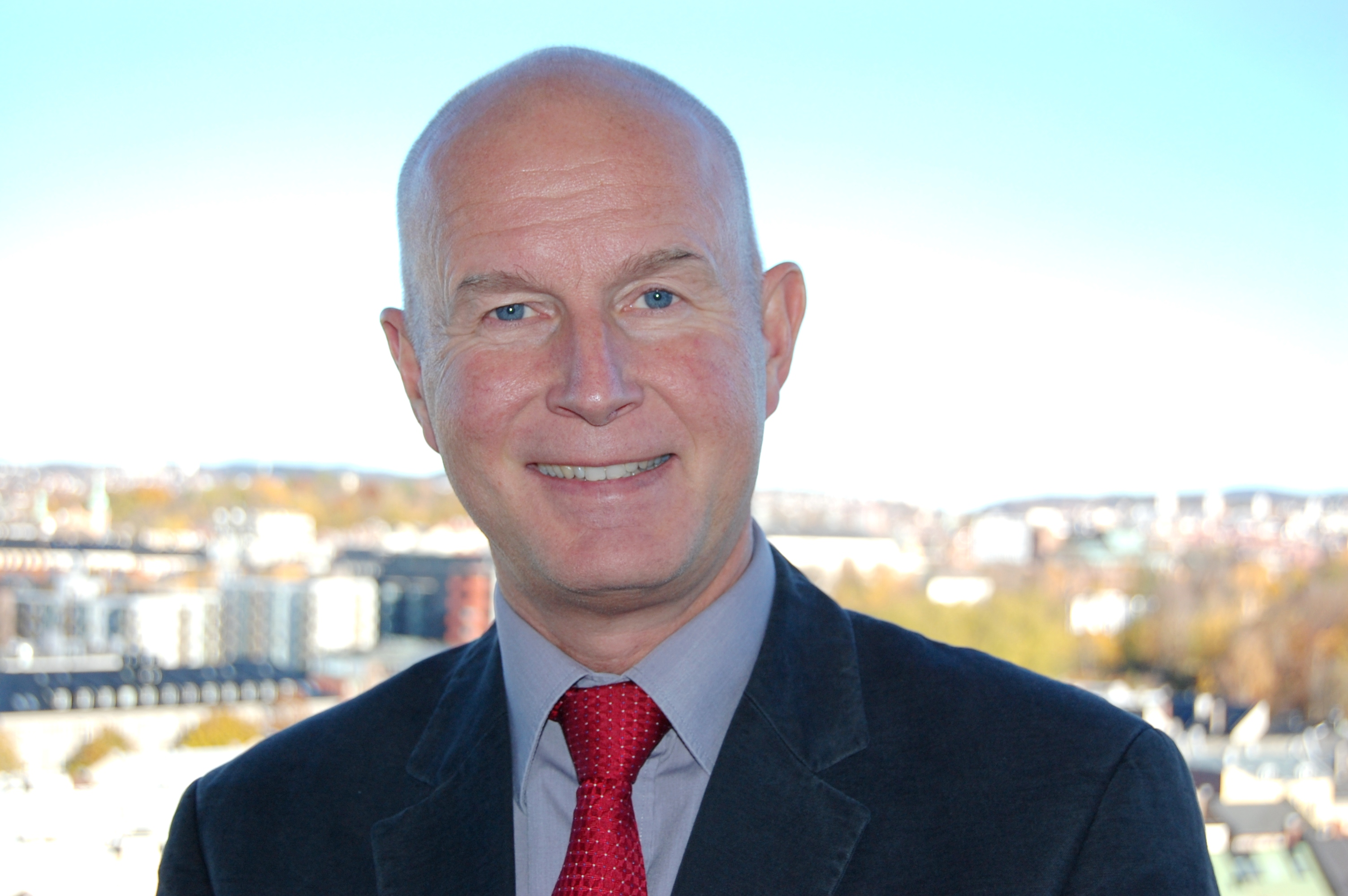
Acting Director of Health Bjørn Guldvog

Bjørn Guldvog (born 16 June 1958) is a Norwegian physician and civil servant.

He took the cand.med. and later the dr.med. degree, and was a researcher at the Norwegian Institute of Public Health from 1989 to 1992. He was then head of department at Stiftelse for helesetjenesteforskning from 1993 to 2001, head of department in the Norwegian Directorate for Health and Social Affairs from 2002, then assisting director from 2004 and director from 2012. The directorate changed its name to the Norwegian Directorate for Health in 2008.

Bjørn Guldvog leads The Norwegian Directorate of Health's work against the COVID-19 pandemic in Norway.

Civic offices
Preceded by Bjørn-Inge Larsen	Director of the Norwegian Directorate for Health; 2012–	Incumbent
