= Else Bugge Fougner =

Norwegian lawyer and politician (born 1944)

Minister of Justice
- In office 16 October 1989 – 3 November 1990
- Prime Minister: Jan P. Syse
- Preceded by: Helen Marie Bøsterud
- Succeeded by: Kari Gjesteby

Personal details
- Born: 9 November 1944 (age 81) Moss, Norway
- Party: Conservative Party

Else Bugge Fougner (born 9 November 1944) is a Norwegian lawyer and a politician for the Conservative Party.

She was born in Moss as a daughter of Jacob C. Bugge (1912–1993) and Bodil Bengtson (born 1919). In August 1974 she married lawyer Amund Fougner. Through her sister Kari she is a sister-in-law of Gunnar Gran.

She was the Minister of Justice 1989–1990.

Preceded by	Chair of Rikshospitalet –1989	Succeeded by Tor Espedal
