= Jakob Modalsli =

Norwegian civil servant

Jakob Modalsli (1 April 1911 – 31 January 1984) was a Norwegian civil servant.

He was born in Strømm, and graduated from the Norwegian College of Agriculture in 1936. In 1947, he was hired as secretary general of the Norwegian Agrarian Association; in 1949 he became director of the Direktoratet for eksport- og importregulering. From 1952 to 1960 and 1962 to 1966 he was the permanent under-secretary of state in the Ministry of Defence. From 1966 to 1981 he was the County Governor of Østfold. From 1973 to 1977 he was the chair of the Norwegian Agency for Development Cooperation.

Civic offices
Preceded by position created	Permanent under-secretary of state in the Ministry of Defence; 1952–1960	Succeeded by Erik Himle (acting)
Preceded by Erik Himle (acting)	Permanent under-secretary of state in the Ministry of Defence; 1962–1966	Succeeded by Erik Himle (acting)
Preceded by Karl Hess Larsen	County Governor of Østfold; 1966–1981	Succeeded by Lars Korvald
