= Ulrik Frederik Christian Arneberg =

Norwegian politician

Ulrik Frederik Christian Arneberg (15 June 1829 – 30 October 1911) was a Norwegian jurist and elected official for the Conservative Party.

== Biography ==
Arneberg was born in the village of Vanse in Lister og Mandal, Norway. His father Ulrik Frederik Arneberg (1795-1835) was the senior priest at Vanse Church (Vanse kirke), near the town of Farsund. After taking examen artium in 1846, he passed his legal examination in 1852.

Arneberg became a proxy for Niels Andreas Thrap who served as the magistrate in Kristiania (now Oslo) until his death in 1856. In 1861 he became a Supreme Court Attorney, in 1866 assessor at the city count of Kristiania and in 1872 the Justiciar. He served as County Governor of Bratsberg Amt (now Telemark) from 1881 to 1889.

He served as a member of the Council of State Division in Stockholm from 13 July 1889. On 1 July 1890, he was appointed Minister of Justice and the Police in Prime Minister Emil Stang's First Cabinet. He held this position until the Stang cabinet fell on 5 March 1891. In 1892 he was elected to the Norwegian Parliament, representing the constituency of Brevik, located in Telemark where he had formerly been County Governor. He served only one parliamentary term.

After this he was appointed County Governor of Smaalenenes Amt (now Østfold). He held the position until 1905.

Political offices
Preceded by Niels Mathias Rye	County Governor of Telemark; 1881–1889	Succeeded by Otto Benjamin Andreas Aubert
Preceded by Ferdinand Nicolai Roll	Norwegian Minister of Justice and the Police; 1890–1891	Succeeded by Ole Anton Qvam
Preceded by Johan Lauritz Rasch	County Governor of Østfold; 1891–1905	Succeeded by Hans Christian Albert Hansen
