= Steinar Stokke =

Steinar Stokke (born 8 October 1955) is a Norwegian businessperson and former civil servant, with prominent positions in the health sector.

By education, he is a political scientist from the University of Oslo. In the 1980s and 1990s he pursued a career in the civil service. In 1988 he was acting subdirector, and was promoted to subdirector, in the Ministry of Finance. He later became acting head of department before being promoted to director in 1992. Another promotion to deputy under-secretary of state in the Ministry of Social Affairs followed in 1993, before he reached the highest-ranking position in the civil service, permanent under-secretary of state, in 1996.

In 1999 he left the civil service to become chief executive of the pharmaceutical wholesaler Apokjeden. He cited a wage of 700.000 kr in the civil service as one of the reasons, deeming is to be too low, and adding that "The public sector is struggling with a leader wage problem. Something must happen here if one wants to keep people". He chaired the board of the public real estate company Entra Eiendom from 2000. He also chaired the National Library of Norway from 2001, but stepped down to board member at the end of 2001. He also chaired Statistics Norway and was a board member of the eyeglass retailer Brilleland.

In December 2001 it was announced that Stokke would be the new chief executive of the new Southern Norway Regional Health Authority. He also became chair of five hospitals or health trusts in the Southern Norway Region; Rikshospitalet, Radiumhospitalet, Ringerike Hospital, Buskerud Hospital and Telemark Hospital. In May 2003 he stepped down from the boards of four of the five hospitals (except Rikshospitalet) as well as Statistics Norway, the National Library and Brilleland. The reason was a flawed project where patient diagnoses was to be coded in different ways to be eligible for public funding. In January 2004, the Southern Norway Regional Health Authority board chairman Oluf Arntsen tried to oust Stokke from the executive chair, following the "coding case" as well as roundhanded pension deals with company executives. Arntsen was supported by deputy chair Helen Bjørnøy and board member Ole Johan Sandvand, but was voted down by the rest of the board (Kaare Norum, Einfrid Halvorsen, Anne Mo Grimdalen, Terje Keyn, Morten Falkenberg and Svein Øverland). Arntsen subsequently had to resign, but in response, the Minister of Health Dagfinn Høybråten promptly relieved the entire board of their positions. An entirely new board was composed in early February, led by Erling Valvik, and after less than two weeks, Stokke resigned. He received a year's wage of about 1.4 million kr and a one-off pension-in-advance of about 1.6 million kr. A new chief executive was not found until December 2004, when Bjørn Erikstein took over.

In the autumn, Stokke also left the chair of Entra Eiendom. Eventually he became involved in the venture Oslo Cancer Cluster together with Ansgar Gabrielsen, who had succeeded Dagfinn Høybråten as Minister of Health in June 2004 and served as such for one year. Stokke and Gabrielsen invested together with Terje Haugan and the Orkla Group in incorporating the Radium Hospital, the Cancer Registry of Norway and Ullern Secondary School into a giant project named Oslo Cancer Cluster Innovation Park (OCCI). This incorporation became a reality, and the tearing down of the old Ullern Secondary School commenced in the summer of 2012. In addition to Oslo Cancer Cluster Innovation Park, Steinar Stokke is a board member of Csam Health and Helse og Idrettsbygg; chair of Steinar Stokke Invest and both board member and managing director of Oslo Næringseiendom and Pharmacy Invest. He has also been a board member in Swedish Apotek Hjärtat. He resides in Asker.

Civic offices
Preceded by Eldrid Nordbø	Permanent under-secretary of state in the Ministry of Social Affairs; 1996–1999	Succeeded by Anne Kari Lande Hasle
Preceded by position created	Chief executive of the Southern Norway Regional Health Authority; 2002–2004	Succeeded by Asbjørn Hofsli (acting)
Preceded by Tor Espedal	Chair of Rikshospitalet; 2002–2004	Succeeded by
Preceded by	Chair of Statistics Norway –2004	Succeeded by Hege Torp
Business positions
Preceded by position created	Chair of Entra Eiendom; 2000–2004	Succeeded by Grace Reksten Skaugen
