= Odd Anders With =

Norwegian politician (born 1955)

Odd Anders With (born 19 April 1955) is a Norwegian journalist and politician for the Christian Democratic Party.

He was born in Mo i Rana as a son of politician Odd With. His own son Aleksander With became a known Christian singer.

He wrote for various news outlets in the 1970s before graduating from the University of Oslo with a cand.mag. degree in law and history of ideas. He edited the religious magazine Credo from 1982 to 1984, while also freelancing for NRK Radio. In 1984 he was hired as a journalist in Adresseavisen, changing to Vårt Land in 1993 and NRK P1 in 1996.

As a politician, With served as a State Secretary in the Ministry of Children and Family Affairs twice; first from 1997 to 1999 as a part of Bondevik's First Cabinet and then from 2001 to 2003 under Bondevik's Second Cabinet. He then served two terms in Trondheim city council from 2003 to 2011 before announcing his exit from politics. He also chaired Trondheim Christian Democratic Party and was deputy leader of the Christian Democratic Party nationwide.

In 2019 he resigned his membership in the Christian Democratic Party, claiming that the party aligned itself too closely with the Progress Party. In the same year he became managing director of the Church City Mission in Trondheim, working until his retirement in 2022. In 2020 he joined the new Center Party.
