= Lyder Bull =

Norwegian civil servant and politician

Lyder Døscher Bull (15 March 1881 – 1959) was a Norwegian civil servant and politician for the Conservative Party.

He was born in Bergen as a son of Daniel Georg Bull and Laura Benedikte Döscher. He was a fourth cousin once removed of Trygve Bull, Brynjulf Bull and Reidar Bull.

He finished his secondary education in 1899, and graduated from university with the cand.jur. degree in 1904. He was a law clerk from 1905 to 1911, when he was hired as a secretary in the Norwegian Ministry of Justice and the Police. He was promoted to assistant secretary in 1917. He was a member of several public commissions and committees, and, living at Jar, he was a member of Bærum municipal council.

He served as the County Governor of Østfold from 1940 to 1951, interrupted by the period from 1941 to 1945 when Hans S. Jacobsen was installed as County Governor by the Nazis during the occupation of Norway by Nazi Germany.

Preceded by Ernst Andreas Johannesen	County Governor of Østfold; 1940–1951 (deposed 1941–1945)	Succeeded by Karl Hess Larsen
