= Morten Rostrup =

Norwegian physician

Morten Rostrup (born 7 March 1958) is a Norwegian physician.

He took the cand.med. degree in 1983 and the dr.med. degree in 1994, and acquired specializations in internal medicine and emergency medicine. He became a physician at Oslo University Hospital and professor of behavioral medicine at the University of Oslo.

In 1996 Rostrup was a co-founder of the Norwegian branch of Doctors Without Borders, serving as president from 1996 to 2002. In 1998 he became vice president of Doctors Without Borders' international council, serving as president from 2000 to 2004.

He is an uncle of Espen Rostrup Nakstad.
