= Anne Cathrine Frøstrup =

Norwegian civil servant

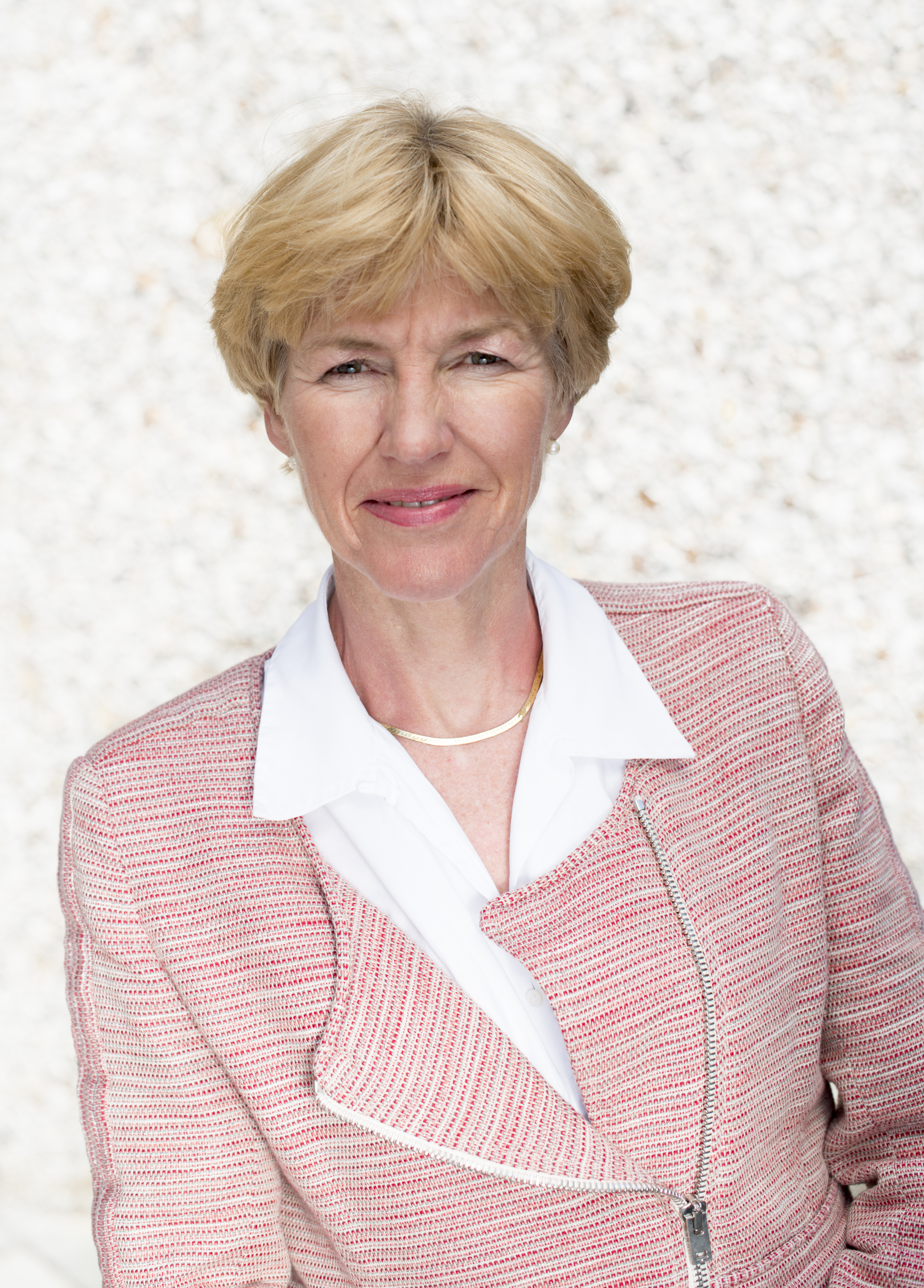
Anne Cathrine Frøstrup in 2012

Anne Cathrine Frøstrup (born 21 September 1954) is a Norwegian civil servant.

She hails from Skien, and graduated from the University of Oslo with the cand.jur. degree in 1981. She worked in the Ministry of Justice from 1981 to 1993, except for the years 1983 to 1985 when she was a deputy judge in Modum and Sigdal District Court. From 1993 to 1995 she served as acting presiding judge in Agder Court of Appeal; and from 1995 to 2003 she was the stipendiary magistrate in Oslo. In 2003 she was hired as director of registry in the Norwegian Mapping and Cadastre Authority, and in 2008 she was promoted to director.

In 2006 Frøstrup was selected as chairman of the Southern Norway Regional Health Authority. She remained so until the merger with the Eastern Norway Regional Health Authority in 2007, upon which she was not re-selected as a board member. In 2010 she became chair of the power company Ringeriks-Kraft.

Civic offices
Preceded by Erling Valvik	Chair of the Southern Norway Regional Health Authority; 2006–2007	Succeeded by position abolished
Preceded by Knut Ole Flåthen	Director of the Norwegian Mapping and Cadastre Authority; 2008–present	Incumbent
