= Courtney Lyder =

Trinidadian-American nurse and educator (born 1966)

Courtney H. Lyder FAAN
- Born: June 8, 1966 (age 59); Trinidad and Tobago
- Education: BA, BS, MS, ND
- Alma mater: Beloit College in Wisconsin, Rush University in Chicago IL
- Occupation: Nursing
- Organization(s): American Academy of Nursing, New York Academy of Medicine
- Known for: Expertise in gerontology and pressure ulcers
- Title: Dean of UCLA School of Nursing
- Term: 2008 – 2015
- Awards: National League for Nursing, President’s Award; Honorary doctorate from Saint Xavier University

Courtney Harvey Lyder (born June 8, 1966) is a Trinidadian-American nurse and educator who is recognized internationally for his work in the field of gerontology.

Lyder served as dean of the UCLA School of Nursing from 2008 till 2015.

== Early life and education ==
Courtney Lyder was born in Trinidad and Tobago before immigrating to the United States.

Lyder received his Bachelor of Arts from Beloit College. He attended Rush University nursing school, one of only five males in a class of two hundred, where he received his Bachelor of Science, Master of Science and Doctor of Naturopathic Medicine. Lyder studied under Luther Christman, the first male dean of a nursing school in the United States, who changed the perceptions and biases people held against males and minorities seeking to enter the field of nursing.

== Career ==
Men are seeing that [nursing] is a viable option that pays well, you have a good lifestyle, you give back to society... Nursing doesn't have a gender. Society and media have portrayed nursing as feminine. It's not.

— Courtney Lyder

In August 2008, Lyder was appointed as dean of UCLA School of Nursing, the first male minority head of any such institution in the United States. Lyder's tenure at the school ended on July 1, 2015.

Staffing is critical... When you see high levels of wounds, you usually see a high level of dysfunctional staff.

— Courtney Lyder

Lyder is internationally recognized for his expertise in gerontology and chronic care issues affecting older adults. He has addressed pressure ulcer prevention, identifying erythema in dark skin, wound healing and quality improvement in skilled nursing facilities, calling attention to the dangers of unnecessary bedsores received by elder patients in hospitals with inattentive staff. According to Lyder and his research team, individuals with chronic conditions such as congestive cardiac failure, pulmonary or cardiovascular disease, diabetes, obesity, and those on steroids who acquire pressure ulcers in hospital were at the highest risk of premature death.

Lyder is a fellow of the American Academy of Nursing and the New York Academy of Medicine. In 2011, he was appointed by United States Secretary of Health and Human Services Kathleen Sebelius to the National Advisory Council for Nursing Research.

=== Seating upgrades criticism ===
Lyder has been cited as one of six deans who leveraged UCLA's lenient medical exemptions in order to upgrade to business class when flying on official college business. Enacted in order to facilitate travel to meetings with wealthy UCLA donors, the travel policy normally required employees to fly coach, except in the following circumstances: when there is a medical need, when coach is unavailable, when using coach would be more expensive or time-consuming, or when the trip involves overnight travel without time to rest before work begins. UCLA paid at least $75,000 for premium flights for Lyder during his tenure. He used a doctor's note—redacted by UCLA—to justify almost half of these trips. Other times he skirted the restriction because he said he needed extra rest on the plane before a busy schedule of meetings.

== Awards and honors ==
- National League for Nursing, President's Award (2012)
- Honorary doctorate from Saint Xavier University for contributions to nursing

=== Eponymous foods ===
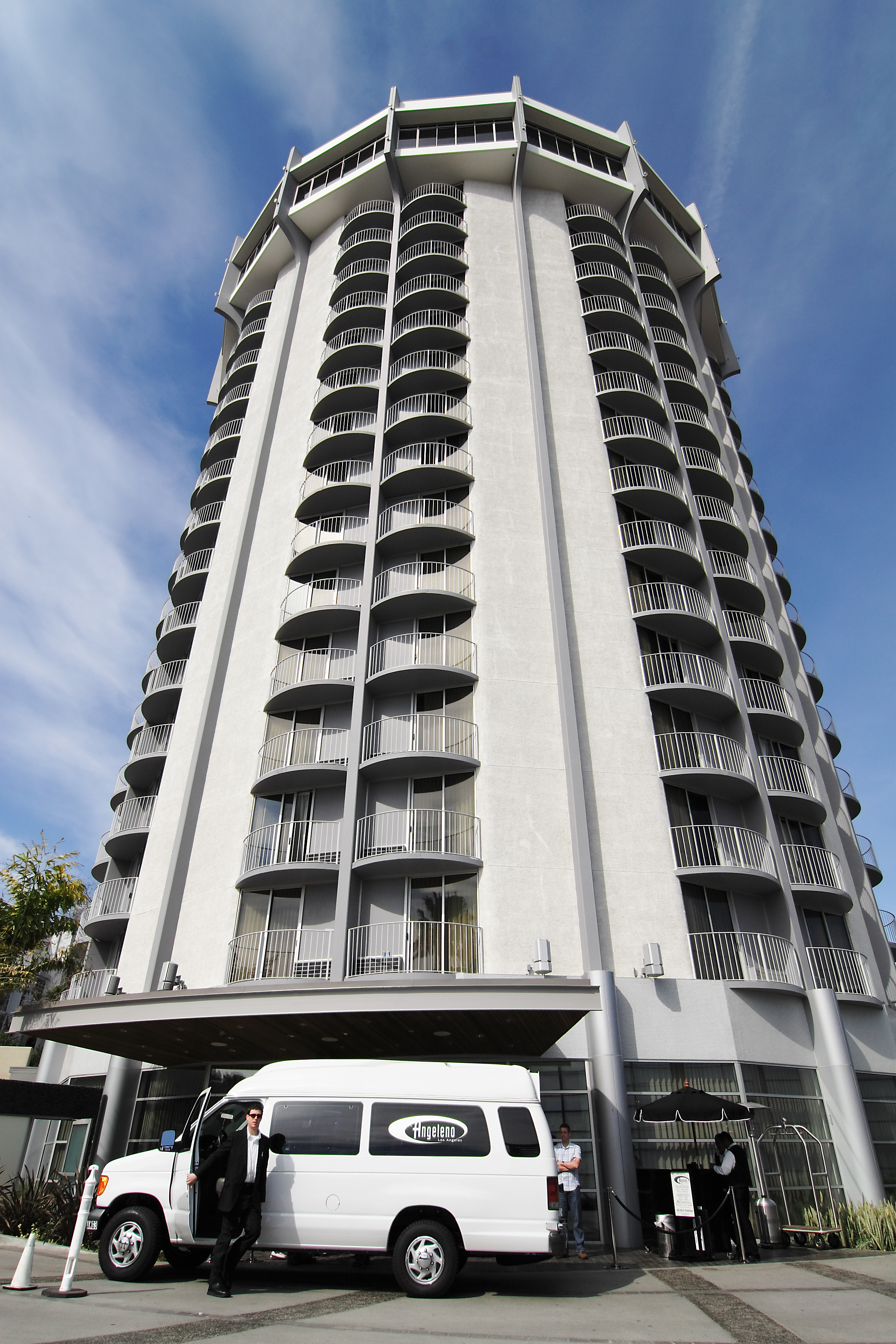
Hotel Angeleno, Los Angeles

There are a number of cocktails and culinary dishes named for Lyder (or his dog), due to him being a regular patron of various Los Angeles restaurants:

Name	Type	Description	Establishment
Black Dean	Cocktail	Martini with jalapeño	Hotel Angeleno, Sunset Boulevard
Doctor's Daiquiri	Cocktail	N/a	Hotel Palomar's Blvd 16, Wilshire Boulevard
Layla's Treat	Cocktail	Named for Lyder's French Bulldog	Hotel Palomar's Blvd 16, Wilshire Boulevard
Dean Lyder	Cocktail	Perfect Manhattan with orange bitters and zest	Napa Valley Grille, Glendon Avenue
The Courtney	Pizza	Spicy chicken, cheeses, basil and avocado	Glendon Bar & Kitchen, Glendon Avenue

== Selected publications ==
- ND, GNP Courtney H. Lyder, Chang Yu, JaeEmerling, MSN, GNP Rupinder Mangat, M.Div., MSN, GNP David Stevenson, MSN(c), RN Ophelia Empleo-Frazier, BS Jim McKay (May 1999). The Braden Scale for Pressure Ulcer Risk: Evaluating the Predictive Validity in Black and Latino/Hispanic Elders. Applied Nursing Research, Volume 12, Issue 2, Pages 60–68.
- Lyder, C., Preston, J., Grady, J., Scinto, J., Allman, R., Bergstrom, N. & Rodeheaver, G. (2001). Compliance with Pressure Ulcer Prevention Quality Indicators in Hospitals. Archives of Internal Medicine 161, 1549–1554.
- Courtney H. Lyder (2002). Pressure Ulcer Prevention and Management. Annual Review of Nursing Research
- Lyder, C., Shannon, R., Empleo-Frazier, O., McGee, D. & White, C. (2002). A Comprehensive Program to Prevent Pressure Ulcers: Exploring Cost and Outcomes. Ostomy/Wound Management 48, 52–62.
- Lyder, C. (2003). Exploring pressure ulcer prevention and management. Journal of the American Medical Association 289, 223–226.
- Lyder, C., Grady, J., Mathur, D., Patrello, M. & Meehan, T. (2004). Preventing pressure ulcers in Connecticut hospitals using the plan-do-study-act model for quality improvement. Joint Commission. Journal of Quality and Safety 30, 205–214.
- Lyder, C. (2007). The Use of Technology for Improved Pressure Ulcer Prevention. Ostomy/Wound Management 53,(4), 14–16.
- Lyder, C. (2006). Effective management of pressure ulcers: A review of proven strategies. Advance for Nurse Practitioners 14(7), 32–38.
- Courtney H. Lyder ND FAAN, Cheryl Chia‐Hui Chen RN MSN GNP, Lynne S. Schilling RN MN PhD (July 7, 2008). A Concept Analysis of Malnutrition in the Elderly, JAN Wiley Online Library
- Lyder, Courtney H. ND, GNP, FAAN; Krasner, Diane L. PhD, RN, CWCN, CWS, BCLNC, MAPWCA, FAAN; Ayello, Elizabeth A. PhD, RN, ACNS-BC, ETN, CWCN, MAPWCA, FAAN (January 2010). Clarification from the American Nurses Association on the Nurse's Role in Pressure Ulcer Staging. Volume 23 - Issue 1 - p 8. Advances in Skin and Wound Care Journal
- Lyder, Courtney H.; Ayello, Elizabeth A. (2008). Pressure Ulcers: A Patient Safety Issue. In: Hughes RG, ed. Patient Safety and Quality: An Evidence-Based Handbook for Nurses. Rockville, MD: Agency for Healthcare Research and Quality; American Nurse Today, July 2011 Vol. 6 No. 7. Retrieved December 17, 2018.
- Lyder, C. &. Ayello, E. (2009). An annual checkup- One year after the implementation of the CMS POA pressure ulcer on admission indicator. Advances in Skin and Wound Care 22, 476–484.
- Courtney H. Lyder ND, Yun Wang PhD, Mark Metersky MD, Maureen Curry MHA, Rebecca Kliman MPH, Nancy R. Verzier MSN, David R. Hunt MD (17 September 2012). Hospital‐Acquired Pressure Ulcers: Results from the National Medicare Patient Safety Monitoring System Study. Journal of the American Geriatrics Society

== See also ==
- Estelle Massey Osborne – pioneering African–American nurse and educator
