= Frostrup =

Frøstrup (anglicised as Frostrup) is a Norwegian surname. Notable individuals with this surname include:

- Anne Cathrine Frøstrup (born 1954), Norwegian civil servant
- Johan Frøstrup (1852–1929), Norwegian judge and politician
- Mariella Frostrup (born 1962), British journalist and television presenter
