= Nesbru =

- Village
- Location in Akershus
- Coordinates: 59.8661°N 10.4903°E
- Country: Norway
- Region: Østlandet
- County: Akershus
- Municipality: Asker
- Time zone: UTC+01:00 (CET)
  - Summer (DST): UTC+02:00 (CEST)

Nesbru is a village in Asker, Akershus, Norway.
