= Cultiva =

Norwegian Foundation

Kristiansand Kommunes Energiverksstiftelse, trading as Cultiva, is a foundation established by Kristiansand Municipality to "secure jobs and good quality of live" through grants to projects within art, culture, knowledge institution, and innovation. The foundation was created on 6 December 2000 and received the funds the municipality obtained from selling its share of Agder Energi to Statkraft. As of 2010, it had capital of NOK 1,359 million, after NOK 350 million had been transferred to Stiftelsen for store kulturanlegg i Kristiansand. The current managing director is Erling Valvik and chairman of the board is Ansgar Gabrielsen.
