= UCSF School of Nursing =

Nursing school in California

School of Nursing
- Type: Nursing school
- Established: 1907; 119 years ago
- Parent institution: University of California, San Francisco
- Dean: Carol Dawson-Rose
- Students: 505
- Doctoral students: 152
- Location: San Francisco, California; 37°45′46″N 122°27′29″W
- Website: http://nursing.ucsf.edu

The UCSF School of Nursing is the nursing school of University of California, San Francisco, and is located in San Francisco, California. It consistently ranks among the top nursing schools in the United States by NIH funding. It is recognized as one of the premier graduate nursing schools in the United States.

== History ==
Following the 1906 San Francisco earthquake, more than 40,000 people were relocated to a makeshift tent city in Golden Gate Park and were treated by the faculty of the Affiliated Colleges (now called UCSF). This brought the school, which until then was located on the western outskirts of the city, in contact with significant swathes of the population and fueled the commitment of the school towards civic responsibility and health care, increasing the momentum towards the construction of health facilities. In April 1907 one of the buildings was renovated for outpatient care with 75 beds. This created the need to train nursing students, and in 1907, the UC Training School for Nurses was established as the fourth Affiliated College of the University of California Medical Department, joining the Colleges of Medicine, Dentistry, and Pharmacy.
