= Bjørn Larsen (economist) =

Norwegian economist and civil servant

Bjørn Larsen (3 April 1922 – 3 November 2007) was a Norwegian economist and civil servant.

He was born in Sandefjord. He graduated with the cand.oecon. degree in 1947. He worked one year at the University of Oslo, then as a consultant in the Norwegian Price Directorate from 1948 to 1952. He applied for an assistant secretary position in the Ministry of Trade 1952, but Larsen being the best qualified applicant, Minister of Trade Erik Brofoss rejected him because he was needed in the Price Directorate. He was instead hired as an assistant secretary in the Ministry of Finance. He was promoted to deputy under-secretary of state in 1958, and remained so until 1971, except for the period from 1961 to 1962 when he served as a director in EFTA. He was the permanent under-secretary of state in the Ministry of Defence from 1971 to 1972 (acting) and in the Ministry of Government Administration and Consumer Affairs from 1972 to 1991.

Larsen also co-wrote the Labour Party's platform on economic policy for the term 1957–1961. He died in 2007.

Civic offices
Preceded by Erik Himle	Permanent under-secretary of state in the Ministry of Defence; 1971–1972 (acting)	Succeeded by Erik Himle
Preceded by	Permanent under-secretary of state in the Ministry of Government Administration and Consumer Affairs; 1972–1991	Succeeded by Bjørn Larsen
