= Bedsted, Thisted Municipality =

Railway town in North Jutland, Denmark

Bedsted
- Town
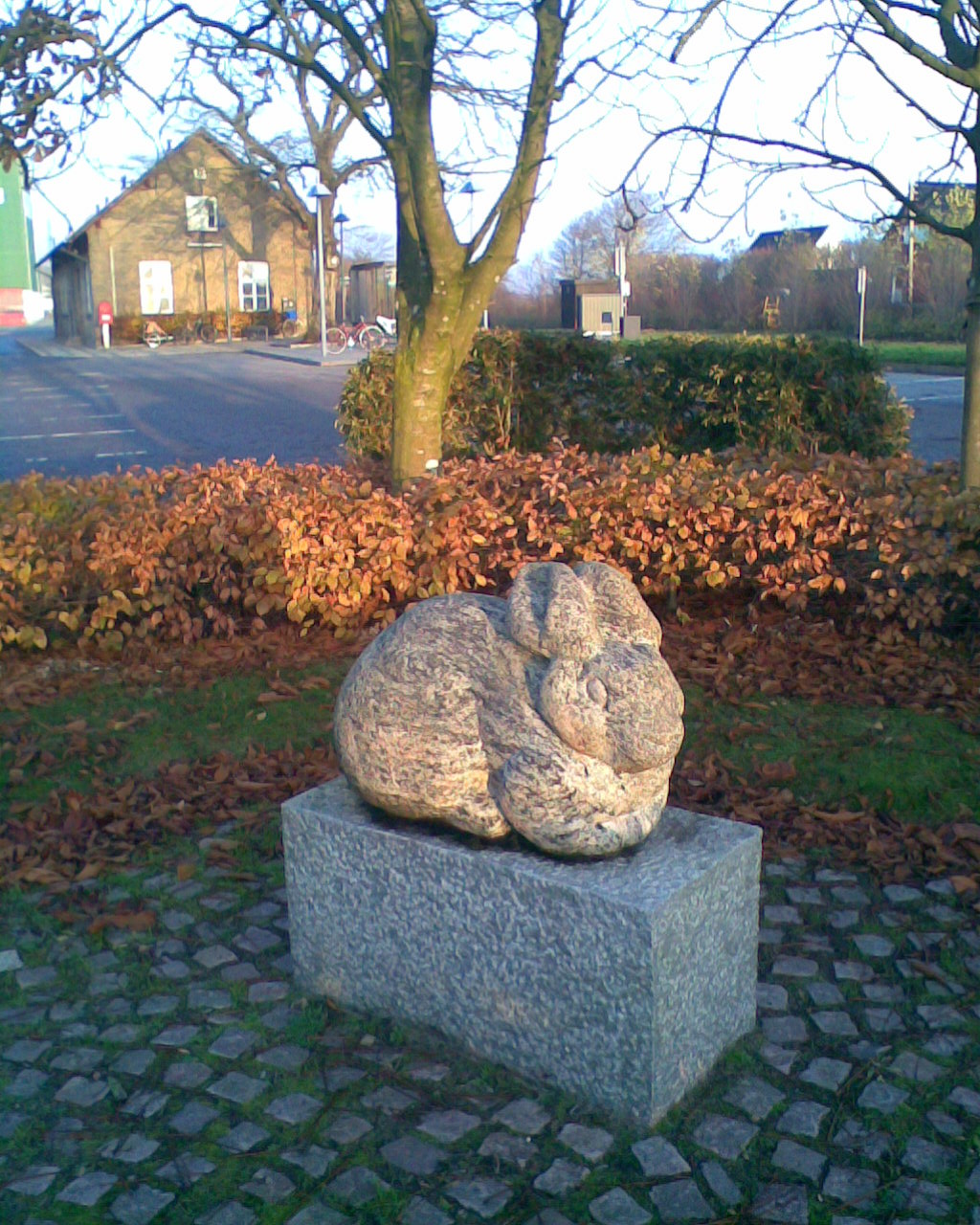
- Sculpture near Bedsted Thy railway station

- Location in North Jutland Region Bedsted (Denmark)
- Coordinates: 56°48′28″N 8°24′31″E
- Country: Denmark
- Region: Nordjylland
- Municipality: Thisted Municipality

Population (2026)
  - Urban: 702
- Time zone: UTC+1 (CET)
  - Summer (DST): UTC+2 (CEST)
- Postal code: DK-7755 Bedsted Thy

Bedsted, in postal and railway terms Bedsted Thy, is a small railway town in Thisted Municipality in North Jutland Region, Denmark. As of 1 January 2026 it has a population of 702. It is located in the southern part of the Thy district about 25 km southwest of Thisted and about 30 km west of Nykøbing Mors.

Bedsted is served by Bedsted Thy railway station located on the Thy Line between Thisted and Struer.

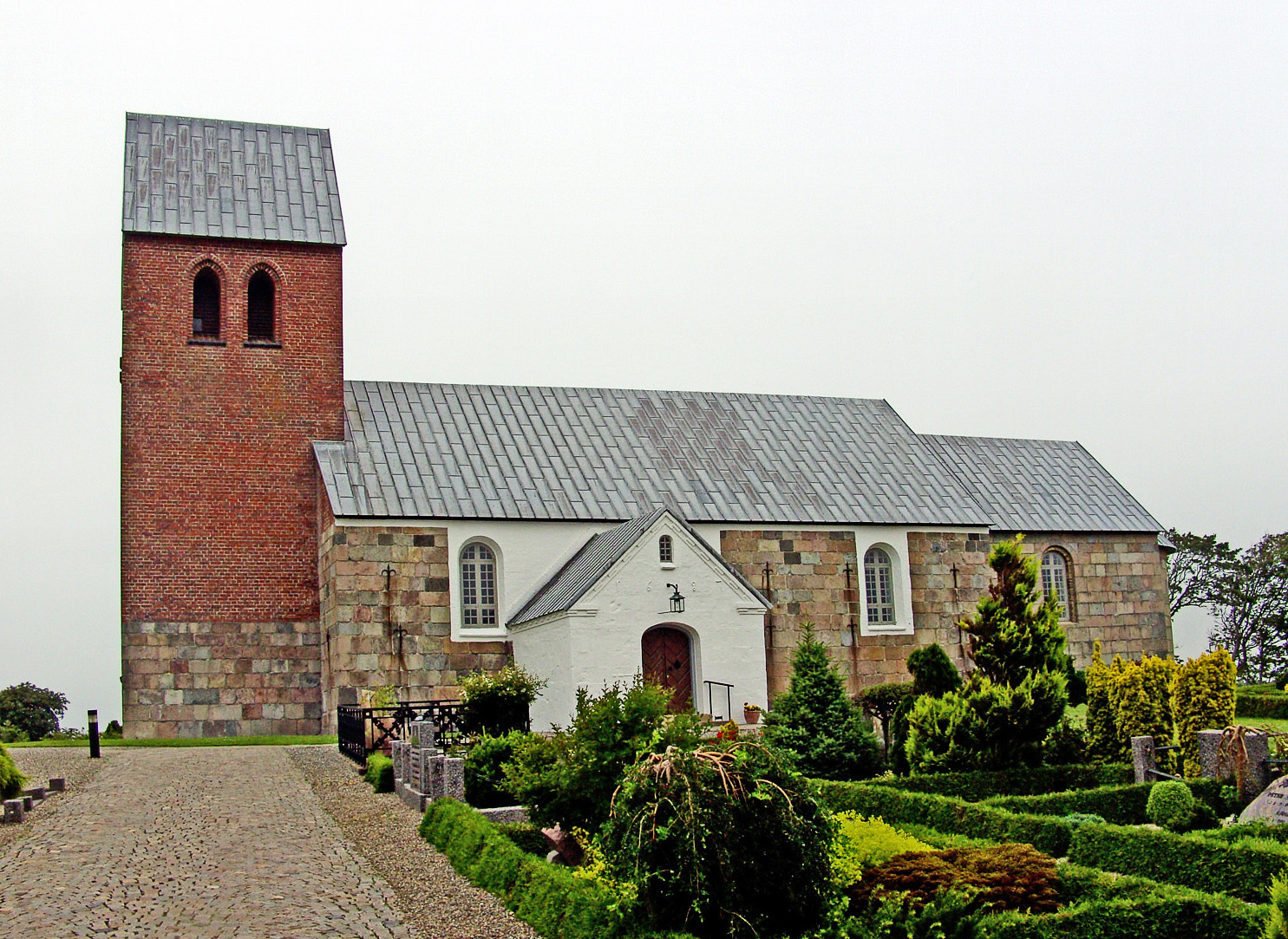
Bedsted Church

The medieval Bedsted Church is located about 2 km northeast of the railway town by the original village of Bedsted.
