= Einfrid Halvorsen =

Norwegian trade unionist and politician

Einfrid Daghild Halvorsen (born 13 October 1937) is a Norwegian trade unionist and politician for the Labour Party. She was mayor of Skien from 1983 to 1986, a State Secretary in the Ministry of Local Government and Labour from 1986 to 1987 and Minister of Administration and Consumer Affairs from 1988 to 1989. After quitting politics, she worked as secretary-general of Mental Helse from 1991 to 2005.

== Career ==
She was born in Skien as a daughter of Einar O. Gunnestad (1910–1951) and Dagmar Stålhave (1902–1974). She started out as a trade unionist, chairing the Union of Employees in Commerce and Offices locally in Skien from 1971 to 1974. She was then a national board member from 1976, and central board member from 1980 to 1984. As a politician, she was a deputy member of Skien school board before serving on the city council (executive committee) from 1971 to 1979. She was elected as a deputy representative to the Parliament of Norway from the constituency Telemark for two terms, 1977–1981 and 1981–1985. She had a brief tenure as regular representative in October 1981, covering for Finn Kristensen who was a member of the outgoing Brundtland's First Cabinet. In total Halvorsen met during 97 days of parliamentary session.

After the 1983 Norwegian local elections, from 1983 to 1986 Halvorsen served as mayor of Skien. Her term ended in May 1986, when Brundtland's Second Cabinet assumed office and Halvorsen was appointed as a State Secretary in the Ministry of Local Government and Labour. She remained such until July 1987. From June 1988 she served as the Minister of Administration and Consumer Affairs. She had to resign in April 1989, following an embezzlement case in her near family. She was then a central board member of the Labour Party until 1990.

Halvorsen was also a board member of National Insurance Scheme Fund and Norwegian Directorate of Labour during the 1980s. In the 2000s she was a board member of the Southern Norway Regional Health Authority, until the Minister of Health Dagfinn Høybråten dissolved the board in January 2004 following disagreements between chief executive Steinar Stokke and two factions of the board. After her political career, however, she is best known as secretary-general of the pro-mental health organization Mental Helse from 1991 to 2005. She was credited for building up Mental Helse from almost nothing to a large and viable organization. She received the Folkeopplysningsprisen award in 2004.

During her time as secretary-general, Halvorsen also chaired the Norwegian Federation of Organisations of Disabled People during the 1990s. From 1995 to 2003 Halvorsen also served a fourth and fifth term in Skien city council. Locally she is also a board member of Skien Airport, Geiteryggen.
