= Norwegian Directorate for Health and Social Affairs =

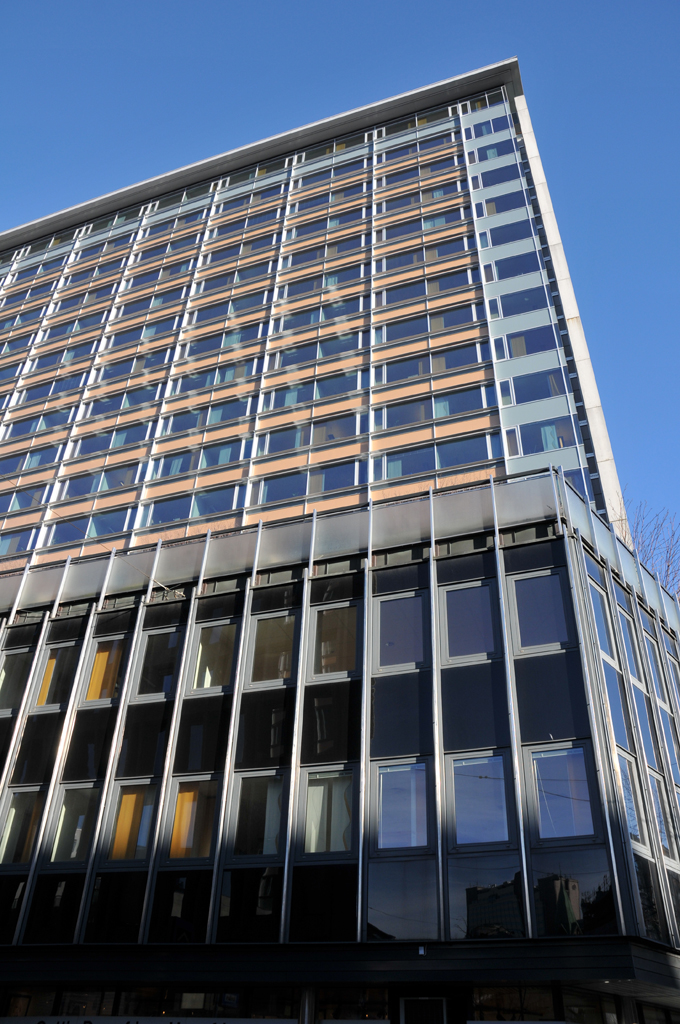
The Norwegian Directorate for Health and Social Affairs. Photo: J. P. Fagerback

The Norwegian Directorate for Health and Social Affairs (Norwegian: Sosial- og helsedirektoratet) is a specialised directorate for health and social affairs. The Directorate is an integral part of the central administration of health and social affairs in Norway, and is organised under the joint auspices of the Ministry of Health and Care Services and the Ministry of Labour and Social Affairs.

The directorate changed its name from Norwegian Directorate of Health and Social Affairs to Norwegian Directorate of Health (Norwegian: Helsedirektoratet) by April 1, 2008.
