= List of Sigma Theta Tau members =

Sigma Theta Tau is an international honor society for nursing. It was established in at Indiana University in Indianapolis, Indiana on October 4, 1922. Following is a list of some of the notable members of Sigma Theta Tau.

== Academia ==
=== Chancellor and president ===
- Mark Lombardi (Honorary, 2023), president of Maryville University
- Diana Natalicio (Honorary, 1999), 10th president of the University of Texas at El Paso
- Donna Shalala (Honorary, 1993), president of The New School and U.S. House of Representatives
- Claribel Wheeler, superintendent of the Washington University School of Nursing and Mount Sinai Hospital School of Nursing

=== Vice-chancellor and provost ===
- Lydia Aziato, vice chancellor of University of Health and Allied Sciences
- Margaret Callahan, health sciences provost at Loyola University Chicago
- Rosemary Donley, dean of the school of nursing and executive vice president of the Catholic University of America
- Address Mauakowa Malata, vice-chancellor at the Malawi University of Science and Technology

=== Dean ===
- Mary G. Boland, associate dean at the Rutgers University College of Nursing and dean of the Nancy Atmospera-Walsh School of Nursing at the University of Hawaiʻi at Mānoa
- Katharine Jane Densford, director of the University of Minnesota School of Nursing, assistant dean of the Illinois Training School for Nurses
- Laura N. Gitlin (Honorary, 2017), dean of the Drexel University College of Nursing and Health Professions
- Paula Milone-Nuzzo (Delta Mu), dean of nursing at Pennsylvania State University
- Elly Nurachmah, dean of the nursing faculty of the University of Indonesia
- Majda Pajnkihar, dean of the Faculty of Health Sciences at the University of Maribor
- Rozella M. Schlotfeldt, dean of the Frances Payne Bolton School of Nursing at Case Western Reserve University
- Carolyn Ladd Widmer, first dean of the University of Connecticut School of Nursing

=== Professor and researcher ===
- Tina Alster, clinical professor of dermatology at Georgetown University Medical Center
- Marion J. Ball (Honorary 2003), Raj and Indra Nooyi Endowed Distinguished Chair in Bioengineering, University of Texas at Arlington
- Ivo D. Dinov (Honorary, 2021), mathematical statistician, data scientist, computational neuroscientist, and professor at the University of Michigan
- Wafaa El-Sadr (Honorary, 2015), professor and director of ICAP at Columbia University
- Paul Farmer (Honorary, 2007), medical anthropologist and chair of the Department of Global Health and Social Medicine at Harvard Medical School
- Nelly Garzón Alarcónn (Upsilon Nu), professor of nursing in postgraduate programs at the National University of Colombia
- Adejoke Ayoola, academic and nursing researcher at Calvin University
- June Clark (Upsilon Xi), professor emeritus of community nursing, at Swansea University
- Ivo D. Dinov (honorary), mathematical statistician, data scientist, computational neuroscientist, and professor at the University of Michigan
- Carol Fowler Durham (Alpha Alpha, 1982) professor and director of the Education-Innovation-Simulation Learning Environment (EISLE) for the University of North Carolina at Chapel Hill School of Nursing
- Lulu Hassenplug (Honorary, 1967), founder of the UCLA School of Nursing
- Nellie X. Hawkinson (Honorary, 1941), led nursing education programs at Western Reserve University and the University of Chicago
- Eleanor Krohn Herrmann, nursing educator at the University of Connecticut
- Vicki Hertzberg (Honorary, 2021), professor in the Nell Hodgson Woodruff School of Nursing of Emory University
- Susan Hickman (Honorary, 2015), geropsychologist and professor at the Indiana University School of Nursing
- Debra Jackson, professor of nursing at the Susan Wakil School of Nursing at the University of Sydney
- Doris Honig Merritt (Honorary, 1987), assistant dean of medical research at Indiana University School of Medicine
- Gita Mishra (Honorary, 2017), professor of life course epidemiology at the University of Queensland
- Daniel Oerther (Honorary, 2011), professor at the Missouri University of Science and Technology
- Mitchell T. Rabkin (Honorary, 1989), professor of medicine at Harvard Medical School and CEO emeritus at the Beth Israel Deaconess Medical Center
- Susan Mokotoff Reverby (Honorary, 1995), Wellesley College professor who wrote about the Tuskegee syphilis experiment
- Richard Ricciardi, professor at George Washington University
- Loredana Sasso, professor of nursing at the University of Genoa
- Helen Turner Watson, associate professor at the UConn School of Nursing
- Karen Fraser Wyche (Honorary, 2017) clinical psychologist and research professor at the George Washington University School of Nursing
- May Wykle, Marvin E. and Ruth Durr Denekas Endowed Chair at the Frances Payne Bolton School of Nursing of Case Western Reserve University

== Activism ==
- Maggie Kuhn (Honorary, 1987), activist known for founding the Gray Panthers movement

== Business ==
- William E. Conway Jr. (Honorary, 2021), co-executive chairman of the board and founder of the Carlyle Group
- David A. Hamburg (Honorary, 1995), president of the Carnegie Corporation of New York
- Lucie Baines Johnson (Honorary, 1985), businesswoman and philanthropist

== Government ==
- Donald Berwick (Honorary, 2007), 13th Administrator of the Centers for Medicare and Medicaid Services
- Jo Eleanor Elliott, head of the U.S. Department of Health and Human Service Division of Nursing; academic
- Vernice Ferguson, nursing department head at the National Institutes of Health Clinical Center and nurse executive with the United States Department of Veterans Affairs
- Marilyn R. Goldwater (Honorary, 1981), Maryland House of Delegates
- Daniel Inouye (Honorary, 1985), Dean of the United States Senate
- Pearl McIver (Honorary, 1954), chief of the Division of Public Health Nursing, United States Public Health Service
- Jessie M. Scott (Honorary, 1969), Assistant Surgeon General and directed the nursing division of the United States Public Health Service

== Literature and journalism ==
- Ellis Avery (Honorary, posthumous), writer
- Suzanne Gordon (Honorary, 1999), journalist and author who writes about healthcare delivery and health care systems

== Medicine ==
- Doris Howell (Honorary, 1989), physician who specialized in pediatric oncology, known as the "mother of hospice" for her pioneering work in palliative care
- Gladys McGarey (Honorary, 2011), holistic physician and medical activist
- John P. McGovern (Honorary, 1989), allergist who established the McGovern Allergy Clinic and the Texas Allergy Research Foundation

== Military ==
- Richard Carmona (Honorary, 2005), vice admiral in the Public Health Service Commissioned Corps and 17th Surgeon General of the United States
- Mari K. Eder (Honorary, 2025), major general of the United States Army
- Diane Carlson Evans (Honorary, 2005), nurse in the United States Army during the Vietnam War and the founder of the Vietnam Women's Memorial Foundation, which established the Vietnam Women's Memorial
- Kathleen L. Martin, Deputy Surgeon General of the Navy/Vice Chief, Bureau of Medicine and Surgery and 19th Director of the Navy Nurse Corps

== Nursing ==
- Ruth Lubic (Alpha Zeta), one of the leaders of the nurse-midwifery movement in the United States
- Florence Nightingale (Honorary posthumous, 1997), founder of modern nursing
- Undine Sams (Beta Tau), nurse
- Ruth Sleeper (Honorary, 1954), director of nursing service and the school of nursing at Massachusetts General Hospital

== Politics ==
- Monique Bégin (Honorary, 1999), Minister of Health and Welfare Canada, Minister of National Revenue, and Member of Parliament
- Rachael Cabral-Guevara, member of the Wisconsin Senate and Wisconsin State Assembly
- Patrick H. DeLeon (Honorary, 1993), psychologist, former chief of staff for United States Senator Daniel Inouye
- Adelaide C. Eckardt, member of the Maryland Senate and Maryland House of Delegates
- Bethany Hall-Long, governor of Delaware and 26th lieutenant governor of Delaware
- Princess Muna Al Hussein (Honorary, 2009), princess consort of Jordan
- Ruth Molly Lematia (Alpha), Member of Parliament of the Republic of Uganda
- Norma Matheson (Honorary, 1993), First Lady of Utah
- Carolyn McCarthy (Honorary, 1999), U.S. House of Representatives
- Donna Rozar, Wisconsin State Assembly
- Louis Stokes (Honorary, 2005), United States House of Representatives

== Science ==
- Roberta Bondar (Honorary, 1995), Canada's first female astronaut and the first neurologist in space

== See also ==
- List of Sigma Theta Tau chapters
