= Adejoke Ayoola =

Nigerian academic and nursing researcher (born 1970)

- Born: Adejoke Bolanle Ayoola; July 20, 1970 (age 56); Nigeria
- Occupation: Professor of nursing

Academic background
- Education: Michigan State University (Ph.D.); Obafemi Awolowo University (BSN, MSN)

Academic work
- Discipline: Maternal and pediatric nursing
- Institutions: Calvin University

Adejoke Bolanle Ayoola (born July 20, 1970) is a Nigerian-American academic and nursing researcher at Calvin University.

== Education ==
Adejoke studied at Obafemi Awolowo University in Ile-Ife, Nigeria, earning BSN and MSN degrees in 1991 and 1998 respectively. She moved to the United States in 2001 to further her education, earning a Ph.D. from Michigan State University, East Lansing, Michigan, in 2007.

Adejoke was a Robert Wood Johnson Foundation Nurse Faculty Scholar at the Calvin College Department of Nursing (CCDON) in Grand Rapids, Michigan.

== Nursing research ==
Adejoke's work with low-income women from diverse ethnic backgrounds in Grand Rapids was published in the Journal of Midwifery & Women's Health in July 2013. She was also the major contributor in a study published in the American Journal of Obstetrics and Gynecology in 2009 examining the relationship between the time of recognition of pregnancy and birth outcomes, such as premature births, low birth weight, admission to the neonatal intensive care unit, and infant mortality. Her research focuses on promoting women and adolescent reproductive health with the primary aim of reducing poor maternal and child health outcomes. Her research on aspects of reproductive health knowledge and pregnancy planning regarding three residential, ethnically diverse low-income communities were the partnering neighborhoods with CCDON program. The goal of the project was to reduce the risk of unplanned pregnancy and promote early recognition of pregnancy. Her research illustrates the importance of nursing research and the research generation's relevance to sustaining effective nursing practice, especially within the constantly changing American health care system. Adejoke is a member of the Midwest Nursing Research Society (MNRS) and the CCDON Vice President for Sigma Theta Tau International Honor Society of Nursing, Kappa Epsilon-at-Large.

== Academic posts and honours ==
- Fellow of the American Academy of Nursing (2020–present)
- Assistant professor, August 2007–present: Department of Nursing, Calvin College, Grand Rapids
- Research assistant, January 2005–present: Department of Medicine, Michigan State University.
- Senior nurse educator, November 2000–August 2003: Post-Basic Nursing School, National Ear Care Center, Lagos, Nigeria.
- Program officer, September 1999–October 2000: Action Health Incorporated, Lagos, Nigeria
- Program officer, June 1998–August 1999: Women Health Promotion Project, Ile-Ife, Nigeria
- Graduate nurse tutor, April 1994–June 1998: Department of Nursing, Obafemi Awolowo University, Ile-Ife, Osun State, Nigeria
- Midwife tutor, May 1993–January 1994: School of Midwifery, Oluyoro Catholic Hospital, Ibadan, Oyo State, Nigeria.

== Selected publications ==
- Pregnancy Intention and Contraceptive Use Among Low Income Women, The Association of Women's Health, Obstetric and Neonatal Nurses is. Orlando, Florida. June 15, 2014.
- "Contraception Practices Place Low-Income Women at Risk for Unintended Pregnancy and Infant and Maternal Death". The Association of Women's Health, Obstetric and Neonatal Nurses (AWHONN). September 16, 2014. Archived from the original on April 17, 2015.
- Adejoke Ayoola (February 16, 2015). "Late Recognition of Unintended Pregnancies". Public Health Nursing. 32 (5): 462–470. doi:10.1111/phn.12182. PMID 25655426.
- Adejoke Bolanle Ayoola; Michigan State University (2008). Timing of Pregnancy Recognition as a Predictor of Prenatal Care Initiation and Birth Outcomes. Michigan State University. College of Nursing. ISBN 9780549617181.
- Adejoke B. Ayoola; Manfred Stommel; Mary D. Nettleman (May 10, 2009). "Late recognition of pregnancy as a predictor of adverse birth outcomes (Presented at the National State of the Science Congress on Nursing Research, Washington, DC, Oct. 2-4, 2008". American Journal of Obstetrics and Gynecology. 201 (2): 156.e1–156.e6. doi:10.1016/j.ajog.2009.05.011. PMID 19646566.
- Adejoke Ayoola (2011). "Reducing the number of antenatal care visits in low-risk pregnancies increases perinatal mortality in low- and middle-income countries; women in all settings prefer the standard visit schedule". Evidence-Based Nursing. 14 (2): 55–56. doi:10.1136/ebn1136. PMID 21421980. S2CID 219236040.
