= Maribor Academic Choir =

The Maribor Academic Choir is a choir based in Maribor in Slovenia. As of 2008 it is under the presidency of Tilen Žibret and conducted by Hungarian conductor Zsuzsa Budavari-Novak who has led the choir since 2002.

Founded in 1964 it began as a male student cultural association (KUD Študent) conducted by Stane Jurgec but following the establishment of the University of Maribor in 1975 the choir permitted both sexes.

== Past conductors ==
- Stane Jurgec
- Simon Robinson
- Jože Fürst
