= Vesna Rijavec =

Slovenian jurist (born 1958)

Vesna Rijavec is a Slovenian jurist and former dean of the University of Maribor Faculty of Law.

Rijavec obtained her diploma in 1980 from the Faculty of Law at the University of Ljubljana, where she also received her master's degree in 1991 and her doctorate degree in 1997.

From 1980 to 1984, Rijavec was an assistant at the Higher Court in Maribor. From 2015 until 2025, she served as the dean of the University of Maribor Faculty of Law.
