= Loredana Sasso =

Italian nurse and researcher (born 1957)

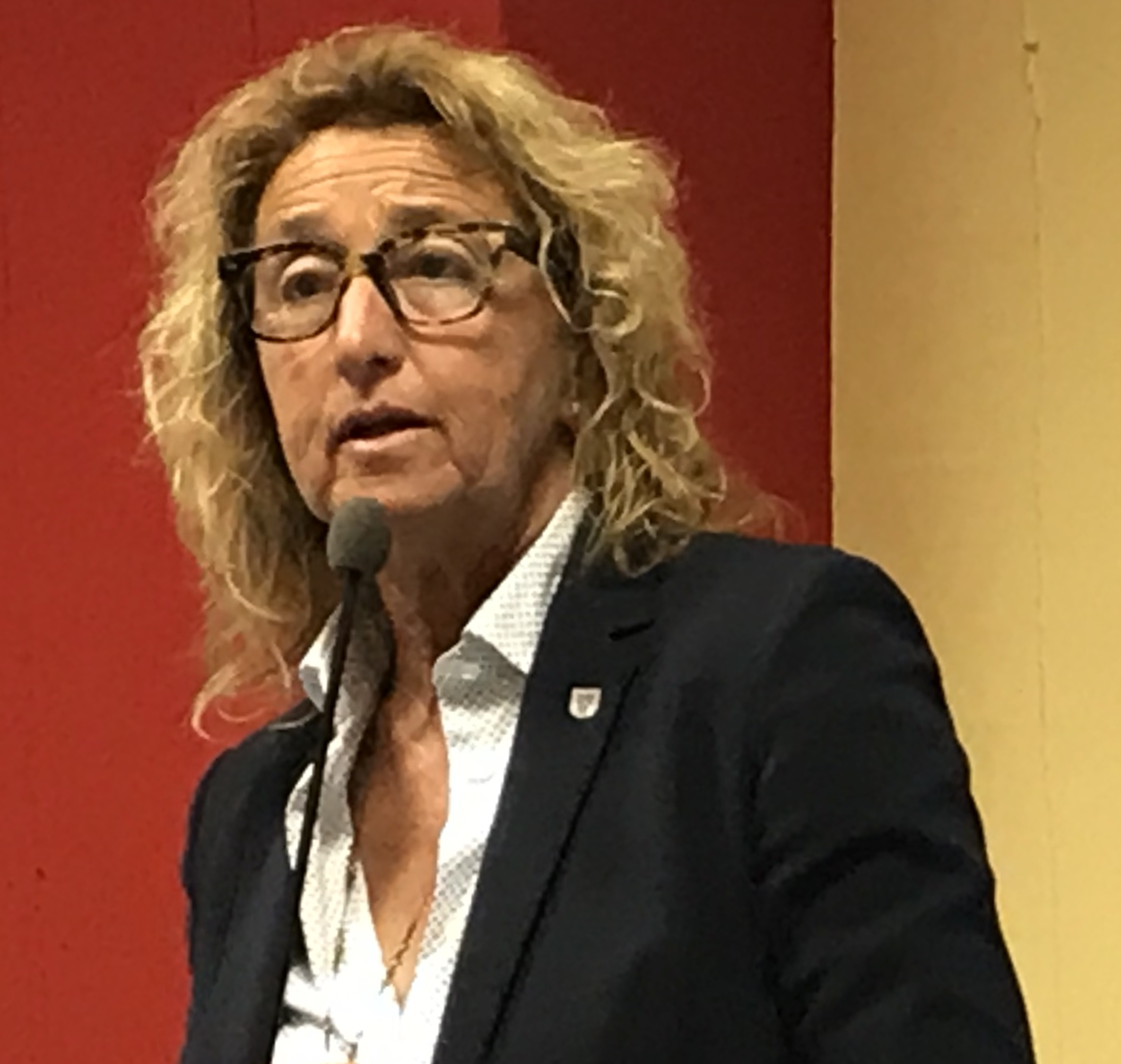
- Born: 28 November 1957 (age 68); Sanremo
- Known for: Research on Nursing

Academic background
- Education: University of Genoa

Academic work
- Discipline: Nursing
- Institutions: University of Genoa
- Website: www.dissal.unige.it/node/253

Loredana Sasso is professor of nursing at the University of Genoa, Italy. She was president of the European Federation of Nursing Regulators (FEPI) Brussels office from 2006 to 2009 during which period she worked on the creation of the Code of Ethics and Conduct for European Nursing. She is Founding President of the first Italian Sigma nursing chapter Alpha Alpha Beta based at the University of Genoa. In July 2022, she was appointed Scientific Director of the Centre of Excellence for Nursing Research and Development - Italian National Federation of Nursing Orders (CERSI - FNOPI) in Rome, Italy.

== Education ==
Sasso is a Registered Nurse with a master's degree from the University of Genoa.

== Professional life ==
Sasso led the establishment of the first PhD program in nursing in Italy. She is a member of the Scientific Committee of the Centre of Excellence for Nursing Scholarship in Rome, co-founder (2012) of the Italian Society of Nursing Sciences, a board member of the Foundation Insieme per Vita agli Anni and former board member (1997-2000) and Secretary General (2000-2009) of the Italian National Federation of Nursing (Federazione Nazionale Ordini Professioni Infermieristiche). She established the Italian leg of the RN4CAST study of nursing workforce, patient mortality and nurse retention. Sasso qualified as full professor in scientific disciplines general clinical and paediatric nursing sciences (Sector MED.45) and was appointed a full professor (2018) at the University of Genoa. She is a Member (2015) of the Honor Society of Nursing Sigma Theta Tau International.

== Awards ==
Sasso is a Fellow (2016) of the American Academy of Nursing and a Fellow (2017) of the Royal College of Surgeons in Ireland Faculty of Nursing and Midwifery ad eundem. In 2024 Sasso was inducted to the International Nurse Researcher Hall of Fame and in 2025 she received the DAISY Award for Extraordinary Nurses, issued by the DAISY Foundation during the 2nd International Congress of the Mediterranean organized by the Nursing Regulator OPI Palermo.

== Publications ==
Sasso has over 150 academic and professional articles listed on Google Scholar which have been cited over 1,000 times giving her an h-index of 21. Her three top cited articles are:

- Coppola, A; Sasso, L; Bagnasco, A; Giustina, A; Gazzaruso, C (2016). "The role of patient education in the prevention and management of type 2 diabetes: an overview". Endocrine. 53 (1): 18–27. doi:10.1007/s12020-015-0775-7. PMID 26494579. S2CID 22042430.
- Sasso, L; Stievano, A; Gonzalez, M; Jurado, G; Rocco, G (2008). "Code of ethics and conduct for European nursing". Nursing Ethics. 15 (6): 821–836. doi:10.1177/0969733008095390. hdl:11567/229352. PMID 18849371. S2CID 206609736.
- Sasso, L; Bagnasco, A; Bianchi, M; Carnevale, F (2016). "Moral distress in undergraduate nursing students: a systematic review". Nursing Ethics. 23 (5): 523–534. doi:10.1177/0969733015574926. PMID 25904547. S2CID 22605337.
