= Susan Hickman =

American geropsychologist and professor

Susan E. Hickman is an American geropsychologist and professor at the Indiana University School of Nursing and the interim president and chief executive officer of the Regenstrief Institute. She is the Cornelius and Yvonne Pettinga Professor of Medicine. Hickman researches palliative care and advance care planning. She was elected a fellow of the Gerontological Society of America in 2023. She earned a B.A. in psychology from Wellesley College in 1992. Hickman received a M.A. (1994) and Ph.D. (1997) in clinical psychology from the University of Kansas. Her dissertation was titled, Young Women's and Men's Perceptions of Sexual Consent in Heterosexual Situations. Charlene Muehlenhard was Hickman's doctoral advisor.
