= Heather E. Bullock =

American psychologist

- Occupations: Professor, Department of Psychology
- Awards: American Psychological Association Committee on Socioeconomic Status Leadership Award (2013)

Academic background
- Education: Ph.D., University of Rhode Island B.A., Allegheny College

Heather E. Bullock is an American social psychologist. She is Professor of Psychology and Director of the Center for Economic Justice and Action (formerly the Blum Center on Poverty, Social Enterprise, and Participatory Governance) at the University of California, Santa Cruz. Bullock is known for her research on people's beliefs about economic disparities and the consequences of stereotypical beliefs about the poor on public policy. This includes work examining attributions about poverty made by news media, and how such attributions influence public support of welfare policies.

== Biography ==
Bullock received her B.A. from Allegheny College in Meadville, Pennsylvania. She went to graduate school at the University of Rhode Island where she obtained her Ph.D. in psychology in 1995 under the supervision of Bernice Lott. Bullock's dissertation examined attributions for poverty by asking middle-class people and welfare recipients to explain poverty. Bullock has served as editor of the journal Analyses of Social Issues and Public Policy. She was awarded the Iva Patterson Gilmore Prize in Psychology from Allegheny College in 1988.

Bullock participated in the APA Task Force on Socioeconomic Status in 2006 and served as the first Chair of the American Psychological Association (APA) Committee on Socioeconomic Status from 2007 to 2009. The Committee honored Bullock with its Distinguished Psychologist Leadership Award in 2013.

With Bernice Lott, Bullock co-authored the book Psychology and Economic Injustice: Personal, Professional, and Political Intersections, which received the Distinguished Publication Award from the Association for Women in Psychology, and recognition from the American Library Association. Bullock is also author of Women and Poverty: Psychology, Public Policy, and Social Justice. In 2018, Bullock was appointed to serve on the APA Working Group on Deep Poverty, which aims to use psychological science to "challenge prejudicial attitudes and beliefs, inform policy and improve practice and programming... [ ] and move beyond current understandings of causes and consequences of poverty."

== Research ==
In Intersections of Ethnicity and Social Class in Provider Advice Regarding Reproductive Health, Bullock and her colleagues Roberta Downing, and Thomas A. LaVeist explored whether low income women experience stigma related to child bearing. They assessed whether low income women perceived their healthcare providers as advising them to limit the number of future children. They found that, in comparison to middle class white women, low income women of color and low income Latinas were at increased odds of being discouraged from having children. The findings demonstrate how ethnicity and social class may influence women's interactions with reproductive health care providers.

In Media Images of the Poor, Bullock and her colleagues Karen Fraser Wyche, and Wendy R. Williams examined stereotypical images of the poor presented in mainstream media. They assessed the prevalence of such imagery as well as classist, racist and sexist imagery, and were particularly interested in whether media depictions of the poor changed after welfare reform in 1999. They determined that most articles expressed the obstacles welfare recipients and the poor faced with sympathy. They felt the media did not do a good enough job conceptualizing poverty, exploring its causes, and seeking solutions. Overall they felt the media presented economic inequality and poverty superficially and felt it was the media's responsibility to challenge beliefs about poverty and generate a movement towards welfare and social class reform.

== Publications ==
- Bullock, Heather E. (1999). "Attributions for Poverty: A Comparison of Middle-Class and Welfare Recipient Attitudes". Journal of Applied Social Psychology. 29 (10): 2059–2082. doi:10.1111/j.1559-1816.1999.tb02295.x. ISSN 1559-1816.
- Bullock, Heather E. (2004-12-01). "From the Front Lines of Welfare Reform: An Analysis of Social Worker and Welfare Recipient Attitudes". The Journal of Social Psychology. 144 (6): 571–590. doi:10.3200/SOCP.144.6.571-590. ISSN 0022-4545. PMID 15565826.
- Downing, Roberta A.; LaVeist, Thomas A.; Bullock, Heather E. (October 2007). "Intersections of Ethnicity and Social Class in Provider Advice Regarding Reproductive Health". American Journal of Public Health. 97 (10): 1803–1807. doi:10.2105/AJPH.2006.092585. ISSN 0090-0036. PMC 1994173. PMID 17761569.
- LIMBERT, Wendy M.; BULLOCK, Heather E. (2005-08-01). "'Playing the Fool': US Welfare Policy from a Critical Race Perspective". Feminism & Psychology. 15 (3): 253–274. doi:10.1177/0959-353505054715. ISSN 0959-3535.
- Limbert, W.M., and Bullock, H.E. (2009). Framing U.S. redistributive policies: Tough love for poor women and tax cuts for seniors. Analyses of Social Issues and Public Policy, 9, 57–83.
- Lott, B., & Bullock, H. E. (2001). Who are the poor? Journal of Social Issues, 57(2), 189–206.
