= Richard Ricciardi =

American professor of nursing

- Born: Brooklyn, NY, United States
- Education: SUNY Downstate Medical Center; Fitzsimons Army Medical Center; University of Maryland, Baltimore; Uniformed Services University of the Health Sciences
- Known for: Advanced practice nursing, policy, leadership
- Awards: Fellow AAN; Fellow AANP; President, Sigma Nursing
- Scientific career
- Fields: Primary Care
- Workplaces: United States Army; Agency for Healthcare Research and Quality; George Washington University
- Thesis: (2006)
- Website: nursing.gwu.edu/richard-ricciardi

Richard Ricciardi is an American professor of nursing. He is best known for his contributions to the United States Army and for improving healthcare practices including team-based care, quality and safety, and the management of patients with complex needs.

Ricciardi earned his BS (1980) in nursing at the SUNY Downstate Medical Center, his certificate to practice as a Pediatric Nurse Practitioner (1983) from the United States Army at Fitzsimons Army Medical Center, and his MS (1991) in primary care at the University of Maryland at Baltimore. He earned his post master's certificate as an adult (2001) and family nurse practitioner (2002) as well as his Ph.D. (2006), all from the Uniformed Services University of the Health Sciences.

Prior to joining the faculty at George Washington University in 2018, where he is currently Professor and Director of Strategic Partnerships for the Center for Health Policy and Media Engagement in the School of Nursing, Ricciardi served as Director of the Division of Practice Improvement at the Agency for Healthcare Research and Quality. Prior to 2010, Ricciardi served on active duty with the United States Army for a period of more than 30 years.

In 2007, Ricciardi was inducted as a Fellow of the American Association of Nurse Practitioners, and in 2013 he was inducted as a Fellow of the American Academy of Nursing.

== Nursing leadership ==
Ricciardi served in United States Army from 1980-2010 and retired at the rank of Colonel in 2010. From 2004-2005, Ricciardi served as President of the National Association of Pediatric Nurse Practitioners. From 2010 - 2019 Ricciardi served as a health services researcher and Director of the Division of Practice Improvement at the Agency for Healthcare Research and Quality. From 2019 through 2021, Ricciardi served as the president of Sigma Theta Tau, the second largest nursing origination in the world. Previously, he served as treasurer, and vice president, and chair of the board of directors of the Sigma Theta Tau Building Corporation.
