= Paula Milone-Nuzzo =

American nurse and academic

Academic background
- Education: BSN, Boston College; MSN, PhD, 1989, University of Connecticut
- Thesis: The organizational variables which affect the development of interpersonal conflict in a department of nursing: a case study (1989)

Academic work
- Institutions: MGH Institute of Health Professions; Pennsylvania State University; Yale School of Nursing; Southern Connecticut State University

Paula Frances Milone-Nuzzo is an American nurse. She served as the president of the MGH Institute of Health Professions from 2017 through 2026 after serving as Dean of Nursing at Pennsylvania State University.

== Early life and education ==
Milone-Nuzzo was born to a policeman and educator. She completed her Bachelor of Science in Nursing from Boston College before earning her Master of Science in Nursing and PhD from the University of Connecticut.

== Career ==
Following her PhD, Milone-Nuzzo joined the faculty at Southern Connecticut State University for nine years before leaving to become a professor at the Yale School of Nursing. Upon joining the faculty at Yale, Milone-Nuzzo developed the United States' first home care master's program and authored the Manual of Home Care Nursing Orientation. She was also named president-elect of the Delta Mu Chapter of Sigma Theta Tau, the second-largest nursing organization in the world. In 1998, as an associate professor, Milone-Nuzzo was elected a Fellow of the American Academy of Nursing in recognition of her "outstanding contributions to the nursing profession through publication, research, professional activities and community service." The following year, she became the Associate Dean for Academic Affairs and was named a Fellow of Hospice and Home Care by Home Care University. Beyond Yale, she also sat on the boards of Care Source and VNA Health Systems and was a member of the Healthy People 2010 Microgrant Advisory Board.

Milone-Nuzzo left Yale in 2003 to become the associate dean of the Pennsylvania State University (PSU) College of Health and Human Development and director of the School of Nursing. Upon accepting this role, she oversaw the restructuring of the School of Nursing to become its own independent academic unit in 2008. Within its first five years, the School of Nursing was granted college status and she assumed the title as dean of the college. In 2016, she received the Honorary Member Award from the Student Nurses’ Association of Pennsylvania. The following year, Milone-Nuzzo was elected president of the MGH Institute of Health Professions. Milone-Nuzzo retired from the IHP Presidency in January 2026 and was succeeded by Deborah Jones.
