= Worldviews on Evidence-Based Nursing =

- Discipline: General nursing
- Language: English
- Edited by: Bernadette Melnyk

Publication details
- Former name(s): The Online Journal of Knowledge Synthesis for Nursing
- History: 1994–present
- Publisher: Wiley
- Frequency: Bimonthly
- Impact factor: 2.931 (2020)

Standard abbreviations
- ISO 4: Worldviews Evid.-Based Nurs.
- NLM: Worldviews Evid Based Nurs

Indexing
- ISSN: 1741-6787 (print); 1545-102X (web)
- OCLC no.: 615401720

Links
- Journal homepage

Worldviews on Evidence-Based Nursing is a bimonthly peer-reviewed nursing journal covering research on nursing practice. It is published by Wiley and was established in 1993 as The Online Journal of Knowledge Synthesis for Nursing. The founding editors-in-chief were Donna Knauth and Jacqueline Fawcett. It is the official journal of the Honor Society of Nursing, Sigma Theta Tau International, and its current editor-in-chief is Bernadette Mazurek Melnyk (Ohio State University).

== Abstracting and indexing ==
The journal is abstracted and indexed in:

- CINAHL
- Current Contents/Social & Behavioral Sciences
- MEDLINE/PubMed
- PsycINFO
- Science Citation Index Expanded
- Scopus
- Social Sciences Citation Index

According to the Journal Citation Reports, the journal has a 2020 impact factor of 2.931.
