= Fred Mazurek =

American football player (born 1943)

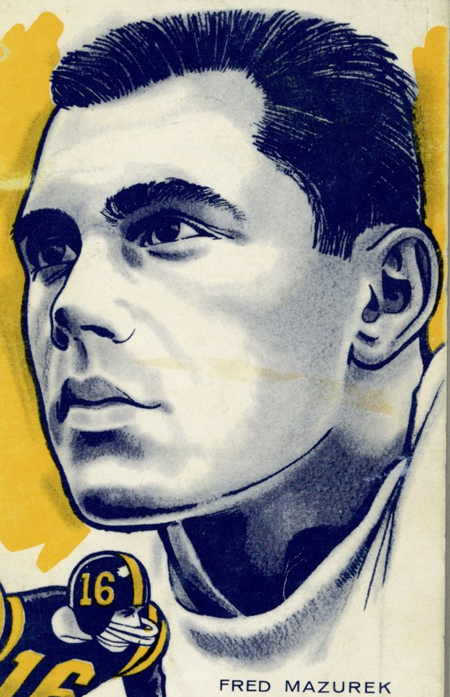
- A 1964 illustration of Mazurek

No. 20
- Position: Flanker

Personal information
- Born: March 21, 1943 (age 83); Uniontown, Pennsylvania, U.S.

Career information
- College: Pittsburgh

Career history
- 1965–1966: Washington Redskins
- Stats at Pro Football Reference

Frederick Henry Mazurek (born March 21, 1943) is an American former professional football player who was a flanker for the Washington Redskins of the National Football League (NFL). He played college football for the Pittsburgh Panthers.

== Biography ==
Mazurek received a scholarship from the University of Pittsburgh and played as the starting quarterback for the Pitt Panthers from 1961 to 1965. Competing for the national championship in 1963 against Navy, he and his team lost 7 to 6 during a game in which Roger Staubach quarterbacked for the Navy team.

Mazurek also played baseball, and was an All-American center fielder for the baseball team at the University of Pittsburgh.

== Personal life ==
Mazurek's younger sister Bernadette Mazurek Melnyk is dean of the College of Nursing at The Ohio State University.
