= Majda Pajnkihar =

Slovenian academic administrator

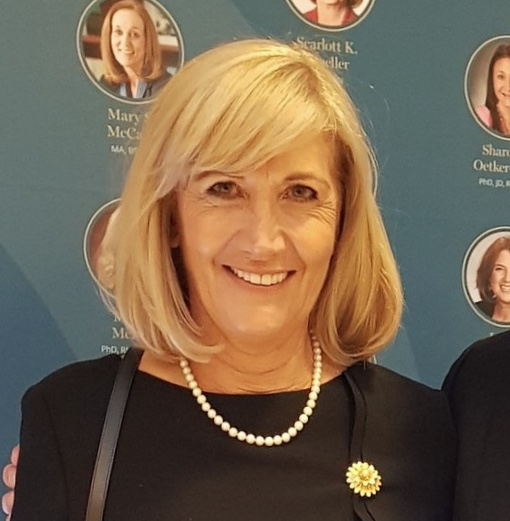
- Born: August 28, 1959 (age 67)
- Known for: Research on Nursing

Academic background
- Education: University of Maribor; University of Manchester

Academic work
- Discipline: Nursing
- Institutions: University of Maribor
- Website: www.fzv.um.si/majda-pajnkihar

Majda Pajnkihar (born 28 August 1959) is former Dean of the Faculty of Health Sciences at the University of Maribor, Slovenia. She is one of the founding members of Udine-C Network (Understanding Development Issues in Nurse Educator Careers), an international research group with the main interest in nursing careers.

== Education ==
Pajnkihar is a Registered Nurse with a Bachelor of Organizational Sciences and a Master of Organizational Sciences from the University of Maribor and a PhD in nursing from the University of Manchester.

== Career ==
Pajnkihar was the first Slovenian to obtain a Nursing PhD in Slovenia and led the establishment of the first Nursing PhD program there. On her initiative the first Institute for Nursing in Slovenia was established in 1996. Pajnkihar was the first head of the Institute for Nursing, which aims to recognize nursing as a scientific discipline and a profession.

She is a member of Sigma Theta Tau the Honor Society of Nursing.

Pajnkihar’s clinical area is child and adolescent nursing.

She has a special interest in nursing theories and research on caring, qualitative research and evidence-based nursing in the area of patient safety, diabetes and efficient patient care.

== Awards ==
Pajnkihar is a Fellow (2018) of the American Academy of Nursing and a Fellow of the European Academy of Nursing Sciences.

== Publications ==
Pajnkihar has 25 publications listed on Web of Science that have been cited more than 150 times, giving her an h-index of 7. Her three most-cited articles are:

- Brxan, PP; Rotman, E; Pajnkihar, M (2016). "Mobile Applications for Control and Self Management of Diabetes: A Systematic Review". Journal of Medical Systems. 40 (9): 210. doi:10.1007/s10916-016-0564-8. PMID 27520615. S2CID 17325834.
- Vrbnjak, D; Denieffe, S; O'Gorman, C; Pajnkihar, M (2016). "Barriers to reporting medication errors and near misses among nurses: A systematic review". International Journal of Nursing Studies. 63: 162–178. doi:10.1016/j.ijnurstu.2016.08.019. PMID 27637011.
- Stiglic, G; Fijacko, N; Stozer, A; Sheikh, A; Pajnkihar, M (2016). "Validation of the Finnish Diabetes Risk Score (FINDRISC) questionnaire for undiagnosed type 2 diabetes screening in the Slovenian working population". Diabetes Research and Clinical Practive. 120: 194–197. doi:10.1016/j.diabres.2016.08.010. hdl:20.500.11820/5e176f15-933f-477f-bf5b-170ab88a7b80. PMID 27592167.

== Book ==
- McKenna HP, Pajnkihar M, Murphy F (2014) Fundamentals of nursing models, theories and practice Wiley Blackwell, Chichester ISBN 978-0-4706-5776-8
