= Karen Fraser Wyche =

American clinical psychologist

Karen Wyche
- Occupations: Clinical Psychologist, Research Professor
- Awards: Sue Rosenberg Zalk Award for Distinguished Service to the Society for the Psychology of Women (2009); Carolyn Wood Sherif Award (2012); Sigma Theta Tau, Honorary Member (2017)

Academic background
- Education: BA, Adelphi University; MSW, University of Maryland; PhD, University of Missouri

Karen Fraser Wyche is a clinical psychologist and research professor whose work focuses on the development of gender roles, coping and stress responses of minority women, community resilience, and cultural competence in intervention settings. Outside of her clinical work, Wyche has been engaged in efforts to advance opportunities for minority women in academia by addressing barriers to their full participation. Wyche holds the title of Research Professor in the Department of Community of Policy, Populations and Systems at the George Washington University School of Nursing.

Wyche is a Fellow of the Society for the Psychological Study of Social Issues (APA, Division 9), the Society of Clinical Psychology (APA, Division12), and the Society for the Psychology of Women (APA, Division 35). The Society for the Psychology of Women gave Wyche the Sue Rosenberg Zalk Award for Distinguished Service in 2009 and the Carolyn Wood Sherif Award in 2012 to honor her sustained and substantial contributions to the field of the psychology of women and gender. She was named an Honorary Member of Sigma Theta Tau International Honor Society of Nursing in 2017.

Wyche co-edited the volume Women's Ethnicities: Journeys Through Psychology and was an associate editor of the APA Handbook of the Psychology of Women.

== Biography ==
Wyche was raised in Harlem, New York City. Growing up, she was surrounded by many powerful women who inspired her to become involved in feminism.

She completed a bachelor's degree in political science at Adelphi University. After received her degree, Wyche went on to work at a YMCA after-school program for girls. Her experience at the YMCA and other activities inspired her to apply to graduate school. She received her Master of Social Work (MSW) from the University of Maryland and subsequently held a number of positions while raising a family. Wyche decided to return to school and completed a Ph.D. in clinical psychology at the University of Missouri.

Wyche was an Assistant Professor of Education and Afro-American Studies at Brown University and, subsequently, a Professor of Psychiatry and Behavioral Sciences at the University of Oklahoma Health Sciences Center, prior to joining the faculty of George Washington University.

== Research ==
Wyche's research program explores the lives of African-American women, their place in society, and their mental health. She often focuses on women who have undergone hardships, their coping strategies, and resilience. Wyche has contributed to research on feminist therapy, which aims to empower women through recognition of social-cultural forces that impact women's lives. In one of her papers, the authors collected the reflections of women attending group psychotherapy sessions to gain insights into their perspectives as women. Wyche collaborated with Heather Bullock and Wendy R. Williams on study involving content analysis of media images of welfare recipients in the context of U.S. welfare reform. Their research suggested a failure of the media to adequately contextualize poverty or illuminate its causes.

Wyche has used narrative methods and interviews to record the life experiences of women living with HIV and Hurricane Katrina survivors. In her paper "Exploring Community Resilience in Workforce Communities of First Responders Serving Katrina Survivors", Wyche and colleagues interviewed 90 first responders who offered their services after the disaster. The authors documented resilience strategies that included shared organizational identity, mutual support, shared leadership, flexible roles, active problem solving, and self‐reflection.
