= Mylan Engel =

American philosopher

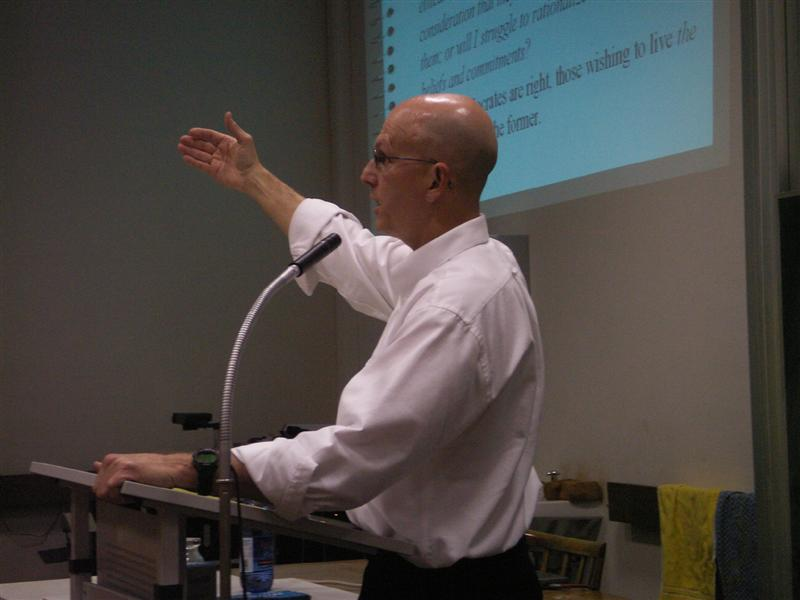
- Born: 1960 (age 64–65)

Philosophical work
- Era: 21st-century philosophy
- Region: Western philosophy
- School: Analytic philosophy
- Main interests: Epistemology; Philosophy of religion Animal rights

Mylan Engel Jr. (born 1960) is a full professor of philosophy at Northern Illinois University in DeKalb.

== Biography ==
Born in Alabama and educated at Vanderbilt University and the University of Arizona, he was hired by Northern Illinois University in 1988. Engel has also served as guest professor at the University of Innsbruck, Austria (1999) and University of Maribor, Slovenia (1999–2002).

Engel's specialties are epistemology, philosophy of religion, Scottish philosopher Thomas Reid, animal ethics, and environmental ethics.

Engel is a "moral vegetarian" (vegan)—the belief that we are morally obligated to refrain from eating meat—and has argued that virtually all humans hold beliefs that, if consistently applied, would make them moral vegetarians as well. Engel has contributed to the study of animal rights and edited the volume The Moral Rights of Animals with Gary Lynn Comstock in 2016.

In his spare time, Engel practices karate. He also offered a beginners course for students at Northern Illinois University.

Professor Engel has been Executive Secretary of The Society for the Study of Ethics and Animals since September, 2002.

== Selected publications ==
- "Fishy Reasoning and the Ethics of Eating". Between the Species: Vol. 23: Iss. 1, Article 3.
- "The Moral Rights of Animals". Lexington Books, 2016. ISBN 978-1498531900
- "Vegetarianism". In The Encyclopedia of Global Bioethics, edited by Henk ten Have. Dordrecht: Springer 2016.
- "Tierethik, Tierrechte und moralische Integrität". Interdisziplinäre Arbeitsgemeinschaft Tierethik (Hrsg.). Tierrechte - Eine interdisziplinäre Herausforderung. Erlangen 2007. ISBN 978-3-89131-417-3
- "The Immorality of Eating Meat". Louis P. Pojman (Hrsg.). The Moral Life. New York/Oxford 2000.
- "Internalism, the Gettier Problem, and Metaepistemological Skepticism", Grazer Philosophische Studien 60 (2000).
- "The Possibility of Maximal Greatness Examined: A Critique of Plantinga's Modal Ontological Argument", Acta Analytica 19 (1997).
- "Coarsening Brand on Events, While Proliferating Davidsonian Events", Grazer Philosophische Studien 47 (1994).
- "The Problem of Other Minds: A Reliable Solution", Acta Analytica 11 (1993).
- "Is Epistemic Luck Compatible with Knowledge?", Southern Journal of Philosophy XXX 2 (1992).
- "Personal and Doxastic Justification in Epistemology", Philosophical Studies 67 (1992).
- "Russellizing Russell: A Reply to His 'A Critique of Lehrer's Coherentism'", Philosophical Studies 66 (1992).
- "Inconsistency: The Coherence Theorist's Nemesis", Grazer Philosophische Studien 40 (1991).
- "Coherentism Reliabilized", Acta Analytica (1986).

== See also ==
- American philosophy
- List of American philosophers
