= Marion J. Ball =

South African born American scientist

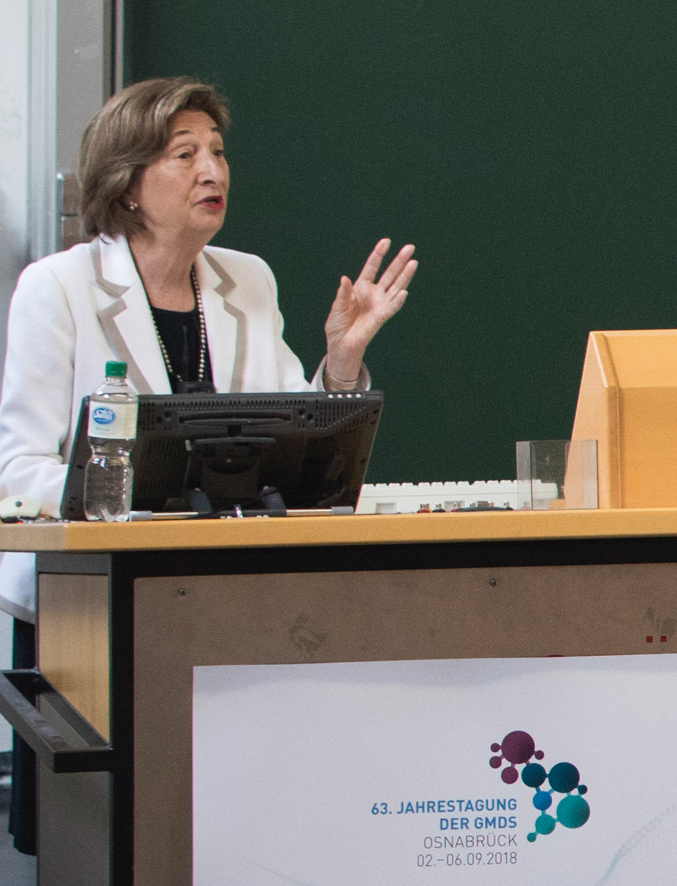
- Born: South Africa
- Education: Temple University; University of Kentucky
- Known for: Health Informatics, Nursing Informatics, Education, Hospital Information System
- Awards: Morris F. Collen Award; François Grémy Award
- Scientific career
- Fields: Medical and Health Informatics Education; Health Information Management
- Workplaces: The University of Texas at Arlington; IBM; Johns Hopkins University; University of Maryland, Baltimore

Marion Jokl Ball is a South African-born American scientist, educator, and leader in global Biomedical and Health Informatics. She holds the Raj and Indra Nooyi Endowed Distinguished Chair in Bioengineering, University of Texas at Arlington, is Presidential Distinguished Professor, College of Nursing and Health Innovation and serves as the Founding Executive Director, Multi-Interprofessional Center for Health Informatics (MICHI), University of Texas at Arlington.

Ball is the author/editor of over 35 books and over 200 articles in the field of Health Informatics.

== Biography and career ==
Ball received her bachelor’s and master’s degrees in mathematics from the University of Kentucky, Lexington, KY, U.S., where she started her career as a programmer and instructor at the Medical Center after graduation.

Serving as the director of the Computer Systems and Management Group at The Temple University Philadelphia, PA, U.S. she worked in parallel on her doctoral thesis in Medical Education. In 1978, she obtained her Doctor of Education (EdD) from Temple University. Moving to The University of Maryland at Baltimore in 1985, she was appointed Director, Academic Computing and later, Vice President Information Services and Chief Information Officer as well as professor at the School of Medicine and adjunct professor of information systems. In the years to follow (1985–2020), Dr. Ball combined academic appointments with leadership positions in the computer and consulting industry.

She held an Adjunct Professorship position at The University of Maryland, School of Nursing, at the Uniformed Services University of the Health Sciences in Biomedical Informatics and at Johns Hopkins University, School of Nursing. At the same time, Ball served as Vice President at First Consulting Group, later as Vice President, Clinical Informatics Strategies at Healthlink, Inc., and finally, in various positions as a Senior Advisor in IBM’s Research Division. In 2020, she moved fully back into academia as the co-founder of the Multi-Interprofessional Center for Health Informatics (MICHI) at the University of Texas at Arlington. She co-directs MICHI together with Gabriela M. Wilson.

She is Professor Emerita, Johns Hopkins University School of Nursing and Affiliate Professor, Division of Health Sciences Informatics, Johns Hopkins School of Medicine. A member of the National Academy of Medicine (NAM),

In the early years of the International Medical Informatics Association (IMIA), Ball was appointed program chair of the IMIA working conference centered on hospital information systems (1978 in Cape Town, South Africa), the first of its kind worldwide. From 1998 to 2019, Ball served on the Board of Health on the Net (HON) (a site search tool certifying medical and health information online). At the Health Record Banking Alliance she provided a conceptual model together with Jonathan D. Gold which instructed how to securely manage health data from citizens to make information available in cases of emergency and in other circumstances such as medical research.

=== Springer Health Informatics Series ===
Started as Computers in Health Care in 1988 edited by Kathryn J. Hannah and Marion J. Ball, the series Health Informatics – as it is now called – has expanded from a few to over 120 books covering the vast diversity of topics in Health Informatics including “Healthcare Information Management Systems”, “Terminology, Ontology and their Implementations”, “Mental Health Informatics”, “Clinical Research Informatics”, and “Evaluation Methods in Biomedical and Health Informatics”.

=== Technology Informatics Guiding Education Reform (TIGER) ===
In 2014, TIGER transitioned to the Healthcare Information and Management Systems Society HIMSS where Ball served as an international co-chair of TIGER. Over the years, Ball has remained active as a TIGER leader by supporting its strategic direction.

=== Nursing and health informatics ===
Ball is one of the educators and scientistis who established Nursing Informatics as a discipline and contributed to its evolvement in the healthcare arena. “She was a prime mover in establishing the nursing informatics program at the University of Maryland”. Through her many books in this area, she influenced nurses and other clinicians. She has served as a bridge builder between technology and the caring professions since 1988.

== Awards ==
- 2023 Glaser Award
- 2021 Distinguished Fellow, American Medical Informatics Association (AMIA)
- 2020 The Academy of Medicine, Engineering and Science of Texas (TAMEST), Member
- 2017 International Academy of Health Sciences Informatics (IAHSI), elected as a Founding Member
- 2008 Honorary Fellow, American Academy of Nursing
- 1984 Distinguished Fellow, American College of Medical Informatics

== Selected publications ==
- Ball, Marion J; Hannah, Kathryn J; Gerdin Jelger, Ulla; Peterson, Hans, eds. (1988). Nursing Informatics: Where Caring and Technology, 1st Edition. Springer. doi:10.1007/978-1-4757-4160-5. ISBN 978-1-4757-4160-5. S2CID 37543086.
- Ball, Marion J; O’Desky, Robert I; Douglas, James W; Albright, Judith V, eds. (1991). Healthcare Information Management Systems: A Practical Guide, 1st Edition. Springer. doi:10.1007/978-1-4757-4043-1. ISBN 978-1-4757-4043-1. S2CID 19406276.
- Ball, Marion J; Silva, John S; Douglas, Judith V; Degoulet, Patrick; Kaihara, Shigekoto, eds. (1994). The Health Care Professional Workstation. Proceedings of an International Medical Informatics Association (IMIA) Conference. Washington D.C., 14–16 June 1993. Elsevier Science, Ireland. ISSN 0020-7101.
- Hannah, Kathryn J; Ball, Marion J; Edwards, Margaret, eds. (1994). Introduction to Nursing Informatics, 1st Edition. Springer. doi:10.1007/978-1-4757-2246-8. ISBN 978-1-4757-2246-8. S2CID 36395054.
- Ball, Marion J; Douglas, Judith V; Gerets, David E, eds. (1999). Strategies and Technologies for Health Care Information: From Theory Into Practice. Health Informatics. Springer. doi:10.1007/978-1-4612-0521-0. ISBN 978-0-387-98442-1. S2CID 32114550.
- Ball, Marion J; Douglas, Judith V, eds. (1999). Performance Improvement Through Information Management: Health Care's Bridge to Success. Health Informatics. Springer. doi:10.1007/978-1-4612-0519-7. ISBN 978-0-387-98452-0. S2CID 30344847.
- Hübner, Ursula H; Wilson, Gabriela M; Shaw Morawski, Toria; Ball, Marion J, eds. (2022). Nursing Informatics: A Health Informatics, Interprofessional and Global Perspective, 5th Edition. Springer Nature. doi:10.1007/978-3-030-91237-6. ISBN 978-3-030-91237-6. S2CID 251021695.
- Kiel, Joan M; Kim, George R; Ball, Marion J, eds. (2022). Healthcare Information Management Systems: Cases, Strategies, and Solutions, 5th Edition. Health Informatics. Springer Nature. doi:10.1007/978-3-031-07912-2. ISBN 978-3-031-07912-2. S2CID 78565431.

=== Children’s books ===
- Ball, Marion J, ed. (1972). What is a Computer?. Houghton Mifflin Company, Boston. ISBN 978-0-395-13772-7.
- Ball, Marion J; Charp, Sylvia, eds. (1978). Be a Computer Literate!. Creative Computing Press. ISBN 978-0-916-68808-0.
