= Nellie X. Hawkinson =

American nurse and nursing educator

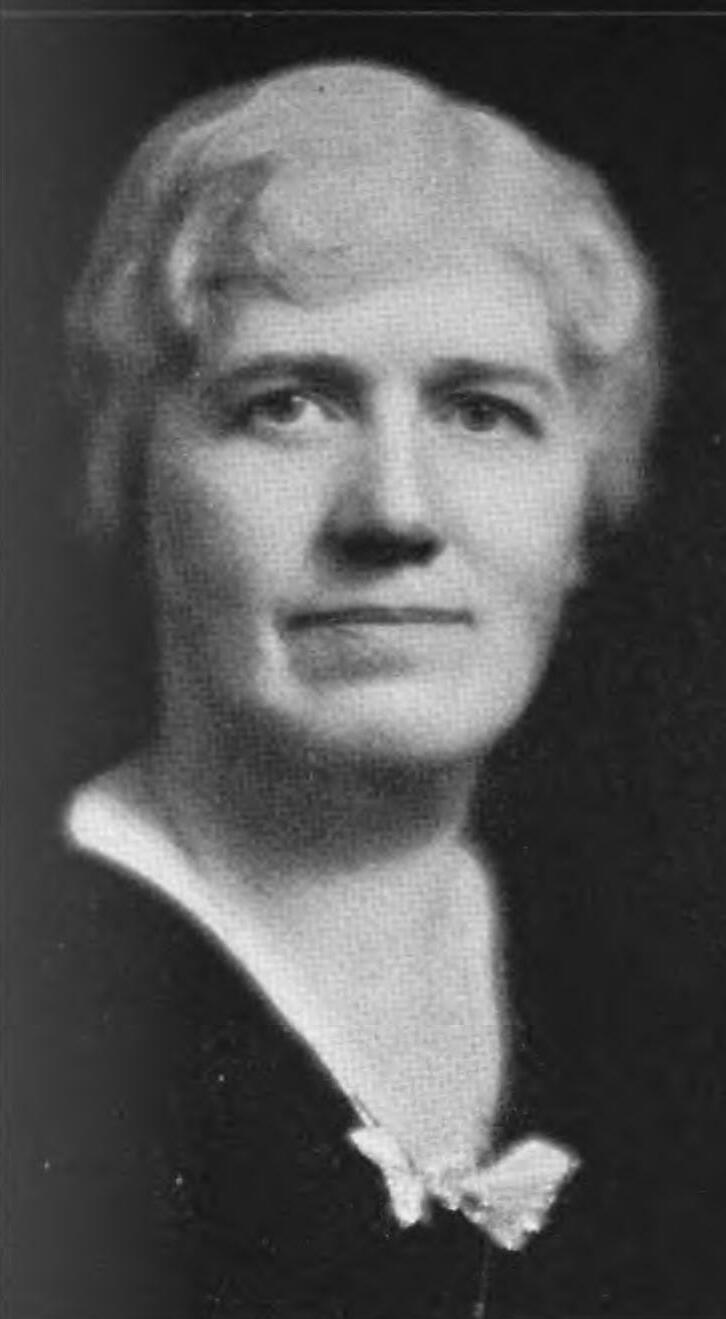
- Born: May 29, 1886; Webster
- Died: October 7, 1971 (aged 85); Evanston
- Occupation: Nurse
- Employer: University of Chicago

Nellie Xenia Hawkinson (May 29, 1886 – October 7, 1971) was an American nurse and nursing educator. She led nursing education programs at Western Reserve University and the University of Chicago. She was twice president of the National League for Nursing Education.

== Life and career ==
Hawkinson was born on May 29, 1886 in Webster, Massachusetts, the youngest of four daughters of Swedish immigrants Sven Hawkinson and Agnes Olson Hawkinson. Hawkinson graduated from the Framingham Hospital School of Nursing in 1909. She earned a B.A. in 1919 and an M.A. in 1923 from Teachers College, Columbia University.

Hawkinson's teaching career began in 1918 as an assistant instructor at the Vassar Training Camp for Nurses. She also taught at Teachers College and Massachusetts General Hospital. In 1923 Hawkinson accepted a position as assistant professor at Case Western Reserve University, and she was promoted to dean at Western Reserve University in 1927. She remained at Case Western University until 1932.

In the years 1932 and 1933 Hawkinson traveled to Europe to study nursing schools and centers of nursing education.

In 1934 Hawkinson was appointed professor of nursing education at the University of Chicago, in a move that founded the university' program in advanced nursing education.

== Career ==
Hawkinson was known for her work in nursing education. She was president of the National League for Nursing Education in 1936 and 1940. She advocated for and led programs in formal education for nurses. She also wrote about Frances P. Bolton who financially supported nursing education at Case Western Reserve University.

== Awards and honors ==
In 1941 Hawkinson was named an honorary member of Sigma Theta Tau.

== Death and legacy ==
Hawkinson died on 7 October 1971 in Illinois.
