= Bernadette Mazurek Melnyk =

American nurse, and academic, professor of paediatrics

- Born: March 20, 1957 (age 69); Republic, Pennsylvania, USA
- Spouse: John Melnyk
- Relatives: Fred Mazurek (brother)

Academic background
- Education: BSN, West Virginia University; MSN, University of Pittsburgh; PhD, 1992, University of Rochester
- Thesis: Coping with unplanned childhood hospitalization: effects of informational interventions on mothers and children (1992)

Academic work
- Institutions: Ohio State University; Arizona State University; University of Rochester
- Main interests: Nursing

Bernadette J. Mazurek Melnyk FAANP (born March 20, 1957) is an American nurse. She is a professor of pediatrics and psychiatry at Ohio State University College of Medicine and dean of the College of Nursing. Melnyk is also the editor in chief of the journal Worldviews on Evidence Based Nursing.

== Early life and education ==
Melnyk was born on March 20, 1957. Growing up in Republic, Pennsylvania, she attended Redstone Township High School and Brownsville Area High School while her brother Fred Mazurek was recruited to play professional football. At the age of 15, Melnyk's mother was diagnosed with high blood pressure and suffered a stroke in front of her in their home. As a result, Melnyk began experiencing post-traumatic stress disorder (PTSD) but found a lack of resources through her family physicians. Within the next four years, various other members of her family died including her cousin, grandmother, and father.

Melynk earned her Bachelor of Science in Nursing degree from West Virginia University before returning to her hometown state and attending the University of Pittsburgh for her Master of Science in Nursing degree and pediatric nurse practitioner certification. While practising at the UPMC Children's Hospital of Pittsburgh, Melynk delivered her first child who experienced complications at birth. She said it was hard for her to continue working in the pediatric unit after this and she accepted a teaching position in the diploma program at UPMC Shadyside Hospital. Following this, Melynk enrolled at the University of Rochester for a PhD in clinical research and her post-masters certificate as a psychiatric mental health nurse practitioner. She divorced her first husband while interviewing for their graduate school.

== Career ==
Upon completing her PhD Melnyk remarried and interviewed at five universities, but chose to stay at the University of Rochester. Shortly thereafter, she was appointed a professor and associate dean for research and director of the Center for Research & Evidenced-Based Practice and Pediatric Nurse Practitioner Program at the University of Rochester's School of Nursing. She also served as a professor of pediatrics in their School of Medicine and Dentistry. In 1999, Ellen Fineout-Overholt applied to Melnyk's Center for Research and Evidence-Based Practice and together they published Evidence-Based Practice in Nursing and Healthcare: A Guide to Best Practice. In recognition of her efforts, she received the Audrey Hepburn Award and the Jessie M. Scott Award from the American Nurses Association. She was named a Living Legend by the American Academy of Nursing in 2026.

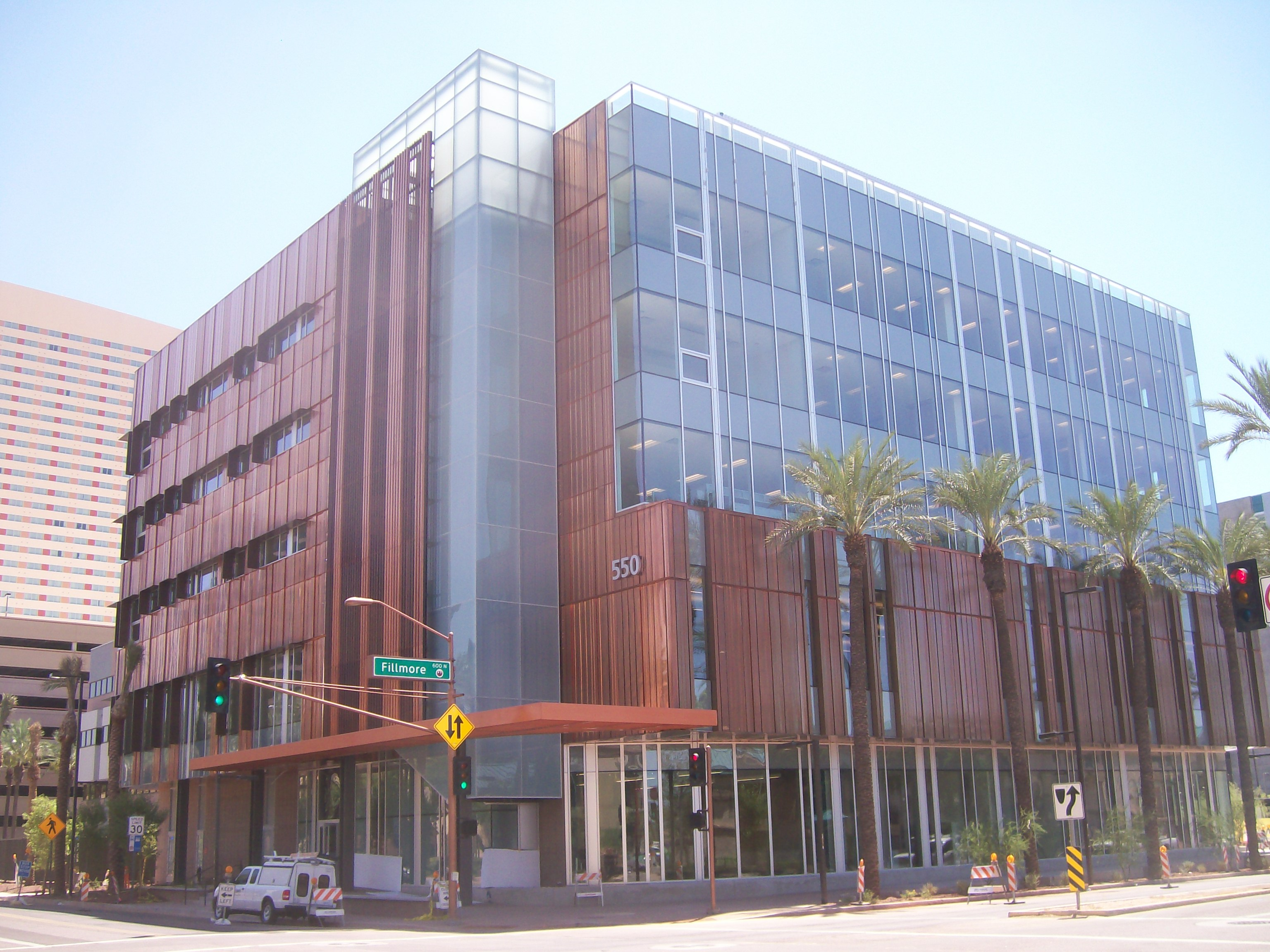
Photo of ASU's College of Nursing & Health Innovation building, where Melnyk worked

In 2004, Melnyk left the University of Rochester to accept a deanship position at Arizona State University's (ASU) College of Nursing, replacing Barbara Durand. Prior to accepting the position, Melnyk told the hiring committee that she would "infuse evidence-based practice throughout all our programs, to work with hospitals and health care systems in Arizona to really advance EBP." After serving in this role for 20 months, she launched the United States' first master's degree program in health care innovation and formed partnerships with the Mayo Clinic, Banner Health, Phoenix Children's Hospital, and Dublin City University. As a result, she was the recipient of the 2006 Health Care Hero Innovator of the Year award which "honors someone who breaks ground in the health care field by developing or implementing new technology, treatments, or programs with wide applications." During her tenure at ASU, Melnyk was elected a fellow of the American Academy of Nursing and the National Academies of Practice while also sitting on the United States Preventive Services Task Force. She also received funding from the National Institute of Nursing Research to establish the COPE program (Creating Opportunities for Personal Empowerment) to help parents of young hospitalized children cope with their illnesses and hospitalization.

On September 15, 2011, Melnyk left ASU to accept a position as Ohio State University's (OSU) dean of the College of Nursing and associate vice president for Health Promotion and chief wellness officer. She was OSU's first chief wellness officer and the first at any United States university. Upon arriving at OSU, she formed the One University Health & Wellness Council, aimed at gathering leaders in health and wellness at the university to improve on the school's culture of wellness. As a result of her accomplishments in intervention research, evidence-based practice, and child and adolescent mental health, she was awarded the 2012 Midwest Nursing Research Society (MNRS) Senior Scientist Award. She continued her research into the COPE program and published data in the American Journal of Preventive Medicine which found that students who exercised for 15 to 20 minutes daily were less likely to gain significant weight than those who attended traditional health classes. This was because the students who exercised were taught cognitive techniques to reduce stress and anxiety.

Melnyk's continued advocacy for evidence-based practices were further recognized in 2013 when her edited book Intervention Research: Designing, Conducting, Analyzing, and Funding received the American Journal of Nursing Book of the Year award for nursing research. She also accepted an appointment to the editor of Worldviews on Evidence Based Nursing, and received an election to the National Institute of Medicine. Based on data including awards, Top 10 rankings, National Institutes of Health (NIH) funding, and National Council Lincensure Examination (NCLEX) passing percentage, Melnyk was named one of 30 most influential nursing deans in 2015. The following year, the third edition of Melnyk's book Evidence-Based Practice in Nursing and Healthcare: A Guide to Best Practice received the 2016 Book of the Year Award from American Journal of Nursing. One of the judges reviewing her book wrote: "This comprehensive text provides a strong foundation for implementing and sustaining EBP in clinical decision making for all levels of nurses, from undergraduate nursing students to doctors of nursing practice and seasoned practitioners. Even beginner students will find the information interesting and will be encouraged to actively engage in EBP to improve patient outcomes." Melnyk also led an evidence-based practices study examining why hospitals that attempt to improve patient outcomes and reduce costs simultaneously often fail. To reach this conclusion, her research team surveyed 276 chief nurse executives across the United States to collect data on how evidence-based practice ranks as a priority in their institutions. In response, more than half reported that it is had limited practised in their organization.

As a leader at OSU's College of Nursing, Melnyk increased their enrollment and hiring of faculty members and rose their school ranking in the U.S. News & World Report. In recognition of her efforts, she was promoted to vice president for health promotion and reappointed dean through 2022. Following her promotion, Melnyk receives the 2017 Sharp Cutting Edge Award from the American Association of Nurse Practitioners for having shown "leadership through innovative services, technologies or advocacy activities that advanced NP practise and patient care on a national level." Likewise, she was also the recipient of the American Organization of Nurse Executives Foundation 2017 Nurse Researcher Award in recognition of "a nurse researcher who has made significant contributions to nursing research and is recognized by the broader nursing community as an outstanding nurse researcher." She continued to study the quality of health care practices across the nation in 2017 by receiving funding from the National Institutes of Health/National Institute for Minority Health and Health Disparities for a study entitled, Healthy Lifestyle Intervention for High-Risk Minority Pregnant Women: A Randomized Controlled Trial. The aim of the study was to test a cognitive behavioural skills building prenatal care intervention program for pregnant minority women experiencing emotional distress.

In 2018, Melnyk received numerous accolades from the medical and nursing community including the American Association of Critical-Care Nurses 2018 Pioneering Spirit Award for her significant contributions that influenced high-acuity and critical care nursing. She was also appointed to sit on the Board of Directors for the National Forum for Heart Disease and Stroke Prevention. The following year, Melnyk was awarded her third “Academy Edge Runner” Honor from American Academy of Nursing for her successful cognitive-behavioral skills building intervention programs. During the COVID-19 pandemic in North America, Melnyk established a partnership between OSU's College of Nursing and Trusted Health, a career platform for nurses. The goal of the partnership was to promote mental health and well-being for travel nurses on the front lines. She also sat as vice chair of the Safe Campus and Scientific Advisory Subgroup of the COVID-19 Transition Task Force and encouraged students to wear face masks.

== Selected publications ==
- Evidence-based practice in nursing & healthcare: A guide to best practice
- Intervention Research: Designing, Conducting, Analyzing, and Funding
