= Zsuzsa Budavari-Novak =

Hungarian conductor

Zsuzsa Budavari-Novak (born 1978 in Kecskemét) is a Hungarian conductor and current leader of the Maribor Academic Choir in Slovenia.

== Biography ==
Following primary and secondary school, Zsuzsa Budavari-Novak studied music teaching and conducting at the University of Music in Pécs. During this time she gained considerable experience as a teacher at various music schools and initially became the conductor of the female choir Cantikum Cydrel which not only performed many concerts in Pecs but toured all over Hungary. She also sang with the vocal group Bach Singers.

Zsuzsa Budavari-Novak studied music at the Faculty of Arts in Pécs and the Academy of Music in Budapest, and graduated from both institutions in 2001.

Following graduation, Zsuzsa Budavari-Novak moved to Slovenia, first working with the Vokalischoir, and then with male octet Osmica she created.

Since 2002, Zsuzsa Budavari-Novak has been the conductor of the Maribor Academic Choir. The Maribor Academic Choir has toured to a number of European countries such as the UK, the Netherlands, Germany, France and Austria.

== Awards ==
- 1986: Gold medal in Cork, Ireland
- 1995: Gold medal in Pardubice, Czech Republic
- 2004: Awarded at the University Choir Festival in Bologna
- 2004: Awarded at the International Choir Competition in Jersey
