= Faculty of Law Maribor =

University of Maribor, Slovenia

Coordinates: 46°33′48″N 15°38′46″E

Faculty of Law, University of Maribor
- Pravna fakulteta Univerze v Mariboru
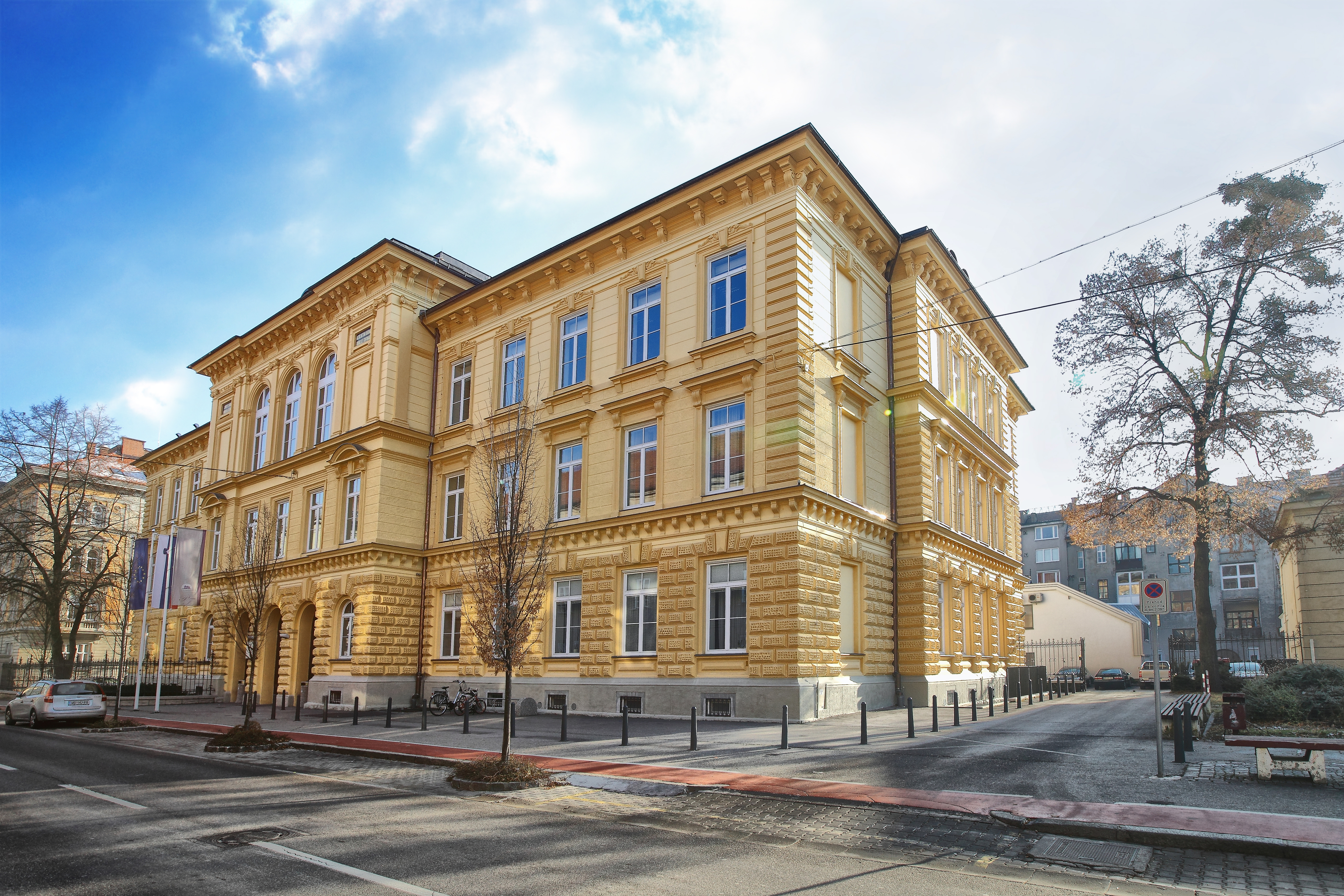
- Type: Public
- Established: 1960
- Dean: Prof. Dr. Tomaž Keresteš
- Students: 800
- Location: Maribor, Slovenia
- Website: www.pf.um.si/en/

The Faculty of Law (Slovene: Pravna fakulteta, PF) in Maribor is a member of the University of Maribor. It was founded in 1960 as a higher law school for education of lawyers in commercial entities. In 1990, it was re-established as a high law school in Maribor with a programme for education of lawyers of universal profile. Since 1993, its official name is Faculty of Law. In 2009, it started with internationally comparable Bologna programmes.

== Research ==
The research priority of the Faculty of Law is "Legal Aspects of the Digital Economy". The research work at the Faculty of Law is organised within applied research institutes and a research group at the faculty level. The research group is publicly financed by Slovenian Research Agency. Researchers are also involved in research within EU financed programmes like Civil Justice/JustT, Jean Monnet, and TEMPUS.

The Faculty of Law annually co-organizes three scientific conferences:

- Medicine and Law
- Corporate Entities in the Market
- Law and Economics

The Faculty of Law publishes two ESCI indexed journals:

- Medicine, Law & Society
- Lexonomica

The Faculty of Law is a co-publisher of SCI indexed journal Lex Localis.
