= Laura N. Gitlin =

American sociologist

- Born: 1952 (age 73–74); Philadelphia, Pennsylvania, US

Academic background
- Education: BA, anthropology, 1974, Temple University; MA, 1976, PhD, 1982, Purdue University
- Thesis: The professionalization of medical superintendents and the treatment of the poor in the United States: the issue of incurability, 1840-1870 (1982)

Laura N. Gitlin (born in 1952) is an American sociologist. She is the Dean of the Drexel University College of Nursing and Health Professions.

== Early life and education ==
Gitlin was born in 1952 and raised in Philadelphia. She completed her Bachelor of Arts degree at Temple University in 1974 and her graduate degrees at Purdue University.

== Career ==
Upon completing her PhD, Gitlin taught at Saint Joseph's University and Rutgers University–Camden before settling at Thomas Jefferson University in 1987. During her tenure at the institution, she was the founding director of the Center for Applied Research on Aging. She also co-founded Jefferson Elder Care, a service division aimed at providing evidence-based dementia care at home. In 2007, Gitlin was elected a Fellow of the College of Physicians of Philadelphia.

Gitlin left Thomas Jefferson in 2011 to join the faculty of sociology at Johns Hopkins School of Nursing (JHUSON), where she would oversee the development of JHUSON Center of Innovation to Promote Healthy Aging (also named ChangingAging: Center for Innovative Interventions). In her first year in the department, Gitlin received the John Mackey Award for Excellence in Dementia Care from the Johns Hopkins Division of Geriatric Psychiatry and Neuropsychiatry. While directing ChangingAging, Gitlin also created Beat the Blues, a five-year, community-based project targeting depression among African-American elders. In 2013, Gitlin used a $1.7 million grant from the National Institutes of Health (NIH) to co-lead the development of WeCare, a caregiver tool to assess and manage behavioral symptoms of dementia. She also collaborated with Nancy Hodgson to develop a Massive open online course in order to teach dementia care to health professionals. In October, Gitlin was chosen to launch and develop the Hartford Change AGEnts Initiative, a multi-year project that aimed to provide care practices for older adults, their families, and communities.

Gitlin was subsequently chosen as the 2014 recipient of the M. Powell Lawton Award from the Gerontological Society of America as a result of her "significant contribution in gerontology that has led to an innovation in gerontological treatment, practice or service, prevention, amelioration of symptoms or barriers, or a public policy change that has led to some practical application that improves the lives of older persons." The following year, she was invited by Health and Human Services Secretary Sylvia Mathews Burwell to serve as a member of her Advisory Council on Alzheimer's Research, Care, and Services. She was later named an honorary fellow of the American Academy of Nursing.

In August 2017, Gitlin left JHUSON to accept a position as Dean of the Drexel University College of Nursing and Health Professions.
