= Nursing Ethics =

- Discipline: Medical Sciences
- Language: English
- Edited by: Ann Gallagher

Publication details
- History: 1994–present
- Publisher: SAGE Publications
- Frequency: Bi-monthly
- Impact factor: 1.957 (2018)

Standard abbreviations
- ISO 4: Nurs. Ethics

Indexing
- ISSN: 0969-7330 (print); 1477-0989 (web)
- LCCN: sn94038858
- OCLC no.: 633246894

Links
- Journal homepage; Online access; Online archive

Nursing Ethics is a peer-reviewed academic journal that publishes papers in the field of Nursing. The journal's editor is Ann Gallagher (University of Surrey). It has been in publication since 1994 and is currently published by SAGE Publications.

== Scope ==
Nursing Ethics is an academic journal which analyses official documents and publishes articles on ethical and legal issues within the Nursing field. The journal aims to relate each topic to the working environment with a practical approach.

== Abstracting and indexing ==
Nursing Ethics is abstracted and indexed in, among other databases: SCOPUS, and the Social Sciences Citation Index. According to the Journal Citation Reports, its 2018 impact factor is 1.957, ranking it 21 out of 118 journals in the category "Nursing (SSCI)" and 40 out of 106 in "Nursing (SCI)".
