= Charlene Muehlenhard =

American psychologist

Charlene Louise Muehlenhard (born 1951) is an American psychologist who researches violence against women, sexual violence, feminine psychology, and human sexuality. She is a professor of in the department of psychology and the department of women, gender, and sexuality studies at the University of Kansas. She is a fellow of the Society for the Scientific Study of Sexuality and the American Psychological Association. Muehlenhard earned a Ph.D. from the University of Wisconsin–Madison. Her 1981 dissertation was titled, A Comparison of Fully and Semiautomated Assertion Training. Richard M. McFall was her doctoral advisor.
