= Oluyoro Catholic Hospital =

- established 12 March 1956 by Rt. Rev. Richard Finn, (SMA)

Geography
- Location: Oluyoro, Oke Adu Road, Ofa, Ibadan, Nigeria

Organisation
- Type: General
- Religious affiliation: Catholic church

History
- Opened: 1959

Links
- Lists: Hospitals in Nigeria

Oluyoro Catholic Hospital (established, 1959) is the largest private hospital in Ibadan, Nigeria. It is also known as Oluyoro Oke Ofa Catholic Hospital.
