= Drexel University College of Nursing and Health Professions =

Private college of Philadelphia, Pennsylvania, US

Coordinates: 39.95674°N 75.16458°W

- Dean: Laura N. Gitlin
- Location: Philadelphia, Pennsylvania, USA
- Affiliations: Drexel University
- Website: www.drexel.edu/cnhp/

The College of Nursing and Health Professions (CNHP), is a college of Drexel University. The college offers six undergraduate degree programs and seven graduate degree programs.

Additionally the college offers continuing education classes for those in the nursing or health professional field and also offers Bachelor and Master's online degree programs in nursing and Online Certificate programs in other areas.
