= Ruth Molly Lematia =

Ugandan gender activist

Ruth Molly Lematia Ondoru
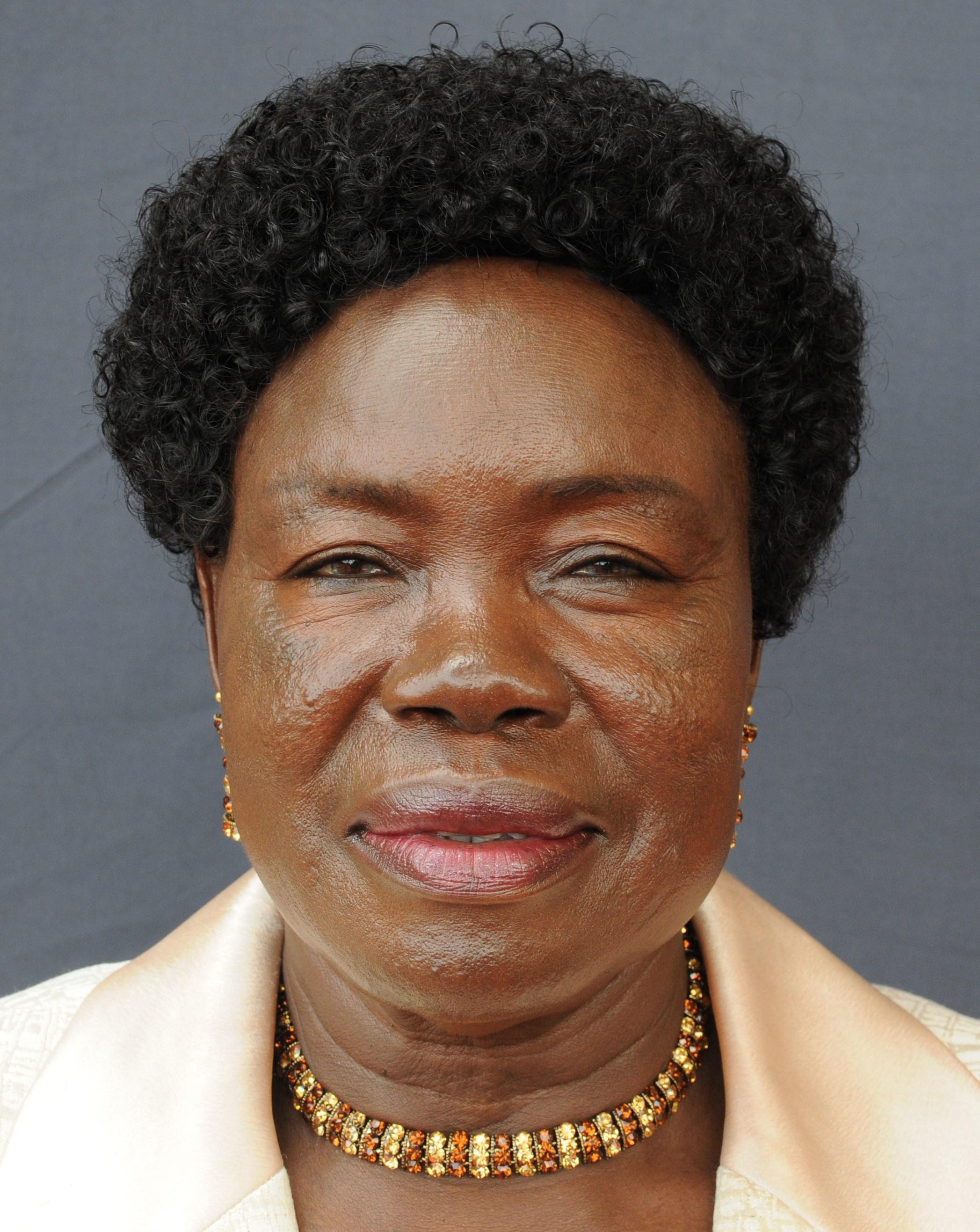
- Born: December 30, 1946 (age 79)
- Education: Case Western Reserve University, US
- Occupation: Politician

Ruth Molly Lematia Ondoru is a Ugandan politician, lawyer and human rights activist who serves as a Member of Parliament of the Republic of Uganda and also Presidential Advisor on Family Affairs. Lematia has also legislated laws and policies in Uganda, she has as well involved in international and regional policy, on peace and economic development in her career.

== Early life and education ==
Molly Lematia was born at River Oli in Arua central division on 30 December 1946 to Sadaraka Oce and Maliza Oberu Oce of Paranga Nigo, Paranga parish in Oleba subcounty, Maracha district. She attended Paranga Primary School where she completed the rest of her primary education and later, she joined Goli Senior Secondary School and Mvara Senior Secondary School for her O'level and A level.

She holds a diploma in general nursing from Mulago School of Nursing and Midwifery. She also holds a diploma in midwifery.

She holds a double master’s degree in oncology and community health from the Case Western Reserve University, US.

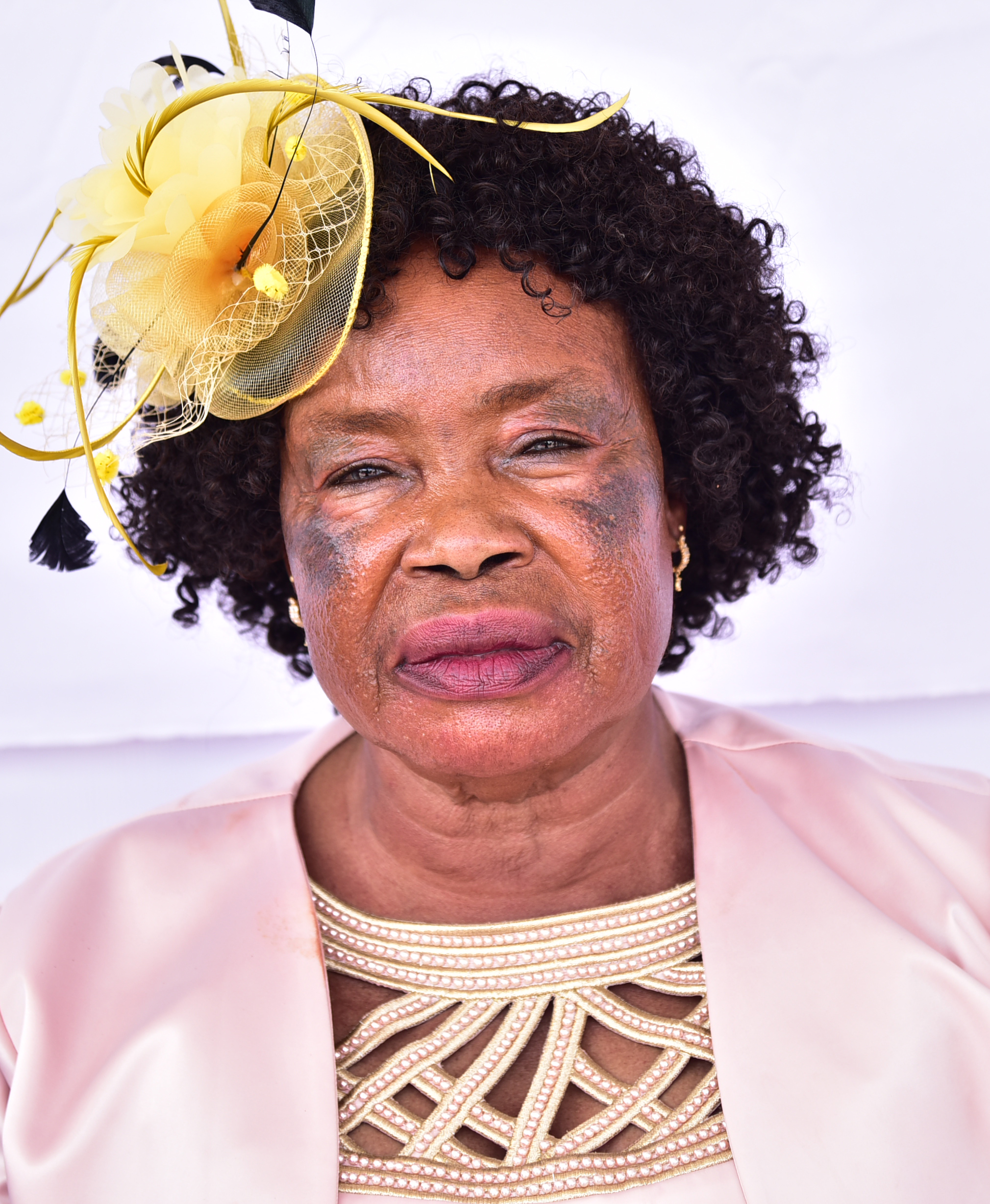
Lematia Ruth Molly Ondrou

== Career ==
Between 2001 and 2015, Lematia was the Commissioner for business, technical, vocational educational and training at Mulago Hospital. She was Deputy executive director of nursing services at the Kampala international University teaching hospital before becoming an Academic head and principal vice-chancellor Aga Khan University, Uganda Campus in 2007 to 2008. She was also a Consultant for West Nile University in nursing affairs.Molly Lematia served as a member of parliament of Uganda from 2011-2016 as the Member of Parliament for Maracha district. She was also the a district councilor of Maracha between 2004 and 2011. She was a Principal and consultant at Mayanja Memorial Training Institute for 8 years from 2010 to 2018, from 2007 to 2016 served as consultant for West Nile University in nursing affairs.

She is a member of the international school of cancer, international school of hospice, Uganda National Nurses Association and the Alpha chapter of Sigma Theta Tau.
