= Mental health informatics =

Mental health informatics is a branch of health or clinical informatics focused on the use of information technology (IT) and information to improve mental health. Like health informatics, mental health informatics is a multidisciplinary field that promotes care delivery, research and education as well as the technology and methodologies required to implement it.

== Metrics and coding ==
- Terminology and coding systems such as the (DSM)
- Specific mental health assessment and diagnostic systems

== Data collection and storage systems ==
Systematic collection of information is fundamental to successful practices. Collecting data useful for mental illness diagnosis and treatment is challenging, as we lack quantitative biomarkers that might be used in standard health informatics, such as body temperature or blood pressure. Largely, current diagnosis and treatment is driven by clinical interviews between professionals and patients. Interviews are not only difficult to draw standardized data from because of diverse individual experience, condition, and accuracy of a patient's memory. Rapid advancements in computation and storage systems have the potential to transform this data collection process. For example, a 2014 study in Ireland explored the use of a smartphone application to record daily mood and thoughts. Such a collection process would provide plentiful standardized data less afflicted by patient recollection issues.

- Integration of mental health function into electronic health record systems (EHRs) and larger organisational systems

=== Mobile and digital sensors ===
The ubiquity of smartphones and other mobile computing platforms is beginning to enable new types of data collection. Recent work has pioneered the use of passive data collection combined with analysis to provide highly relevant features such as: amount of time exposed to human speech, geospatial activity (total distance traveled throughout the day), physical activity, and sleep duration. Additionally, researchers are prototyping simple mobile applications that could replace portions of infrequent qualitative clinical interviews with more regular quantitative data.

== Telehealth ==
Telehealth, telemedicine and telepsychiatry are new care delivery methods made possible by information technology. Specifically, there is a body of research investigating the use of mobile devices to deliver treatment suggestions or treatment reminders in the context of mental health.

Much of the telehealth literature is concerned with patient populations that are difficult to provide traditional medical care to, such as those in rural locations, soldiers, or veterans. These groups stand to benefit from telehealth practices. An inspector general review of US Veterans Affairs facilities in North Carolina and Virginia revealed that 36% of patients had to wait more than a month for appointments. Telehealth professionals are interested in decreasing these wait times by increasing aspects of appointment efficiency.

=== Patient perspectives ===
Of course, introducing significant use of new technology into medical practice is a large departure from conventional mental health treatment. Several studies investigate the effect of introducing technology into general medical interventions as well as mental health treatments specifically. A review of several studies found that patients were generally satisfied with the medical care received via Telehealth, however the effectiveness and efficiency of programs reported mixed results. In many studies it's challenging to determine if the outcomes were a result of the introduction of technology, as authors fail to describe why they are making such an intervention.

A study investigating the design of a passive mental health mobile application for use by teenagers and young adults indicated that teenagers would be most open to using technology to help with mental health issues if it was developed as a smartphone application. Additionally, teenagers would be more motivated in using such applications if there was a social or gamified component, however they expressed potential concern about negative perceptions about using the app. Research indicates that while older patients struggle to accept changes in care, technological resistance is generational, indicating that current and future generations would be open to using telehealth.

=== Technology to promote healthy practices ===
In addition to providing more accurate and reliable data for mental health care providers, smartphones have the ability to provide reminders for healthy practices and appointments. Jen Hyatt, the founder and CEO of Big White Wall, a UK behavioral health social enterprise, comments that existing mental healthcare focuses on diseases rather than health practices and behaviors. Particularly, research has shown that how much we travel and communicate with other people throughout the day is an important factor in our overall mental health. Future applications may leverage location systems in modern mobile phones to track a user's geospatial activity and suggest certain actions through notifications if dangerous patterns are detected.

=== Augmenting care delivery ===
In addition to new types of treatments and interactions, the introduction of technology and informatics has the ability to improve existing mental healthcare effectiveness and efficiency. A UK based study found that a simple digital intervention such as sending SMS (text message) reminders to patients a few days before a mental health appointment decreased missed clinical appointments by 25% to 28%, translating to a potential cost savings of more than £150 million.

== Data analysis ==
Collection of enormous amounts of structured data on mental health patients introduces the possibility of improved mental health care, mental health policy, and overall perception of mental health. This analysis would be performed on a macro-scale, the study of the incidence of mental health in a public health and epidemiological context.

== Need for mental health informatics ==
The need for and application of health informatics in primary and secondary health care has been well established in developed countries for 20 years or more. The application of informatics in mental health has not become as pervasive, in spite of professional recognition the domain appearing well suited to computerisation and the need for quantified outcome evidence. There also may be a professional reluctance to effect changes in established working patterns that the introduction of systems necessarily entails.

== Concerns ==
Data and information in health informatics are inherently private and personal. Pervasive software systems designed to help diagnose and treat mental health symptoms expose a privacy vulnerability and will likely require regulatory standards and data protection compliance such as HIPAA to protect patients. A major impediment may be societal stigma associated with mental disorders as well as increased sensitivity about protecting the privacy and confidentiality of records in mental health care.
