= Action Health Incorporated =

Organization promoting young people's health

- Founded: 1989; 37 years ago
- Type: Non-profit organization; non-governmental organization
- Purpose: Promoting young people's health and development
- Headquarters: Lagos, Nigeria
- Region served: Africa
- Key people: Dr Uwemedimo Uko Esiet (Co-founder, Director); Adenike O. Esiet (Co-founder, Executive Director)
- Website: www.actionhealthinc.org

Action Health Incorporated (AHI), established in 1989 in Lagos, Nigeria, is a non-profit organization dedicated to promoting the health and development of young people, particularly adolescent girls, "to ensure their successful transition to healthy and productive adulthood". Integral to AHI's programming is the involvement of the young people themselves, who play a prominent role in organizing activities and representing AHI at local, national, and international conferences.

== Purpose and activities ==
Action Health Incorporated (AHI) is a non-governmental organization that was established in 1989. Serving as an advocate and catalyst for change, AHI focuses on advancing the well-being of young people through increasing public awareness and implementing innovative education, healthcare, and youth development programs, working especially with girls, and with local communities/opinion leaders, media, private sector and at governmental level.

Towards promoting a better understanding of human sexuality in Africa, AHI additionally facilitates and hosts the Africa Regional Sexuality Resource centre (ARSRC, established in 2002), as well as the secretariat for the African Federation for Sexual Health and Rights (AFSHR), which is the regional arm of the World Association for Sexual Health. A major collaborative venture convened by the AFSHR is the biennial Africa Conference on Sexual Health and Rights, which most recently took place in June 2022 in Freetown, Sierra Leone, hosted by Purposeful, an Africa-rooted global hub for girls organizing and activism, together with other international groups such as WOW, in partnership with the Government of Sierra Leone.

AHI's co-founder/director Dr. Uwemedimo Esiet, who also serves as president of AFSHR, said in 2022: "We work with young girls, parents, leaders, youth-serving organizations, government agencies and policymakers to design and implement innovative and participatory projects in education, healthcare, and youth development, providing models that have been adopted and expanded by government and other civil society organizations."

As described by international non-profit organization Ashoka, AHI "has designed and implemented innovative and participatory projects in education, established an infrastructure for the dissemination of information, and created channels for publicity and advocacy, designing models that have been adopted and expanded by government and other citizen sector organizations." Underlining the importance of partnerships, particularly when controversial issues are being addressed, executive director Adenike Esiet has said that "the more people believe in the issue you are advocating for, the more likely you are to succeed."

== Recognition ==
The impact of AHI's work has been recognized with national and international awards, including the World Association for Sexual Health (WAS) Award for Excellence & Innovation in Sexuality Education, and the MacArthur Foundation Award for Creative and Effective Institutions.
