= University of Maribor =

University in Maribor, Slovenia

- Univerza v Mariboru
- Type: Public
- Established: 1975; 51 years ago
- Rector: Zdravko Kačič
- Administrative staff: 1,800
- Students: 13,988 (2023)
- Location: Maribor, Slovenia; 46°33′34″N 15°38′40″E
- Colours
- Website: um.si

University rankings

Global – Overall
- QS World: 901-950 (2026)

Regional – Overall
- QS Emerging Europe and Central Asia: 80 (2022)

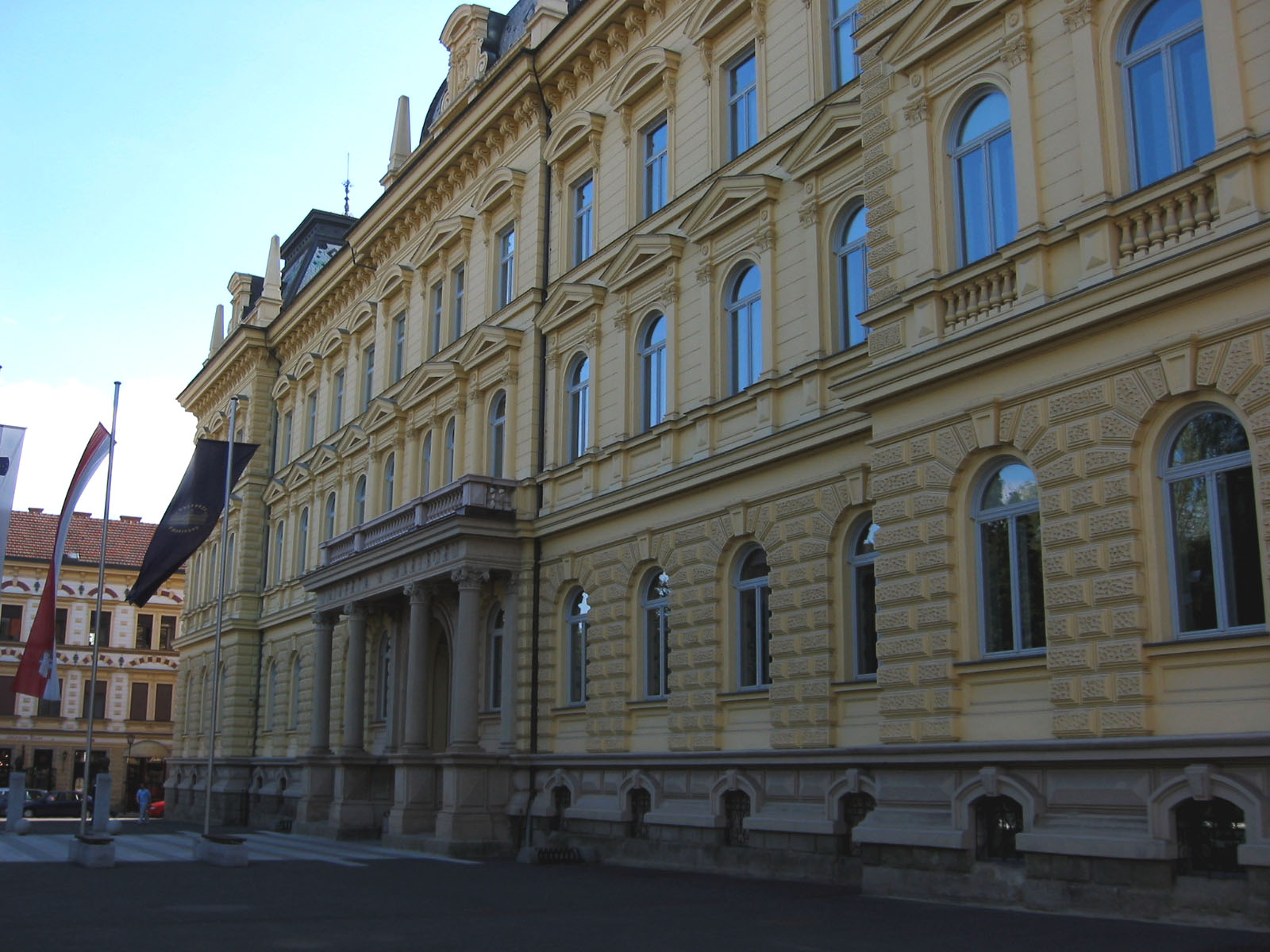
University of Maribor

The University of Maribor (Slovene: Univerza v Mariboru) is Slovenia's second-largest university, established in 1975 in Maribor, Slovenia. It currently has 17 faculties.

== History ==
The university's roots reach back to 1859 when a theological seminary was established with the encouragement of Maribor bishop and patriot Anton Martin Slomšek. More faculties were established during the late 1950s and early 1960s; the faculties of economics, business, and technology in 1959, agronomy and law in 1960, and pedagogy in 1961. The university's opening ceremony occurred on 19 September 1975. The 1970s was a decade of exponential rise in the number of higher education institutions in the former Yugoslavia when alongside Maribor universities in Osijek, Rijeka, Split, Mostar, Podgorica, Bitola, Banja Luka, Kragujevac and Tuzla all opened their doors.

Rectors of the University of Maribor were Dali Džonlagić, Alojz Križman, Ludvik Toplak, Ivan Rozman and Igor Tičar. In late 2017 and early 2018, Jan Žan Oplotnik was acting rector for almost one year. In 2018 Zdravko Kačič was elected rector.

== Reputation ==
The university has entered the top 1% of institutions in physics and, of the nine institutions entering the top 1% in this field, the University of Maribor did so with the highest number of citations, according to an analysis of data from Essential Science Indicators from Thomson Reuters.

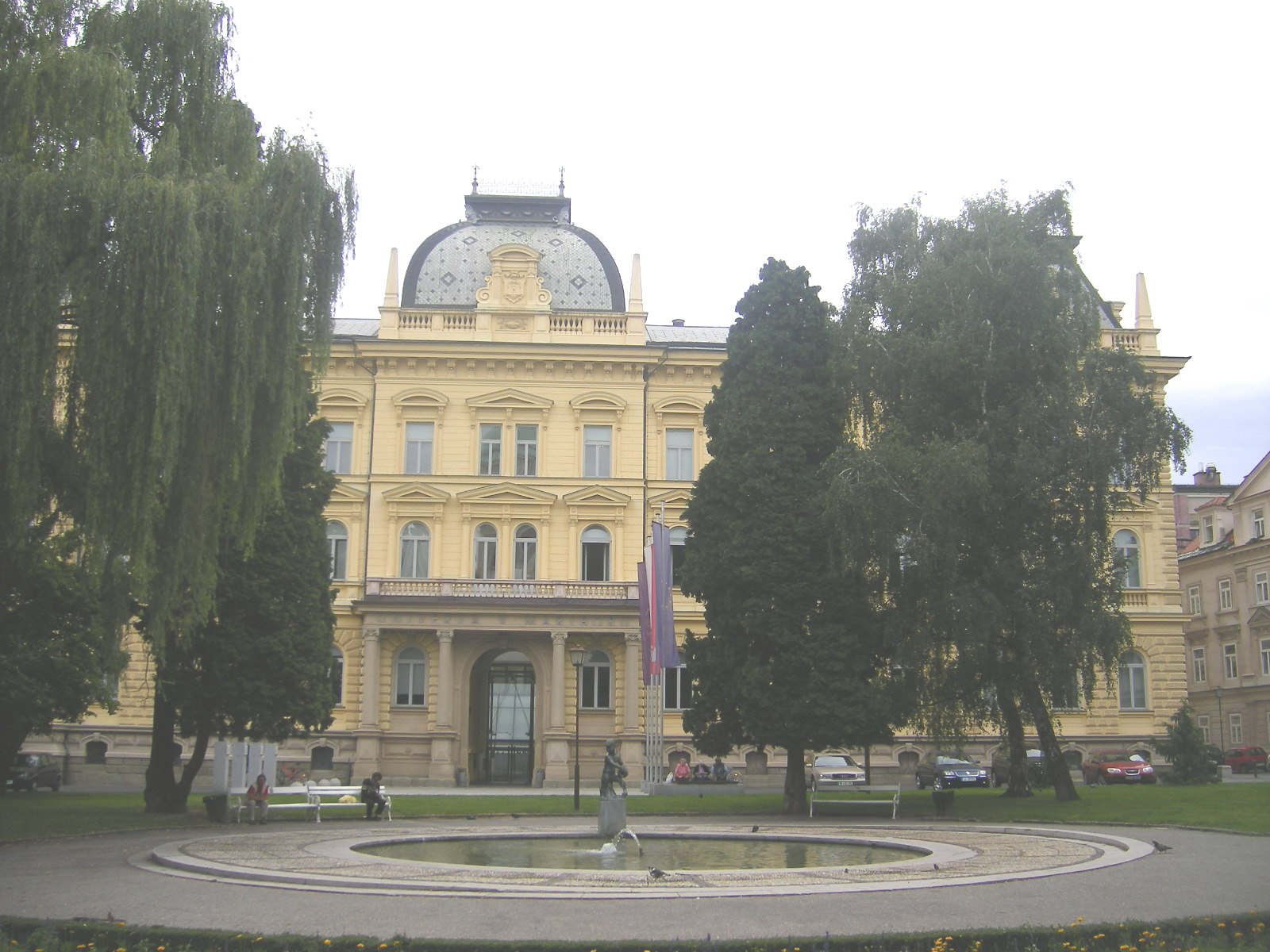
University of Maribor

The University of Maribor has cooperated in European Framework Programmes since 1998 and the number of international research projects is increasing each year. According to "Ranking Web of World Universities", the University of Maribor is in the top 15 of "Top Central and Eastern Europe Universities". It currently (2010) holds the 534th position (of 12,000) of the world universities ranking, which ranks it among the top 5% of universities in the world.

== Organization ==
The university is divided into 17 faculties:

- Faculty of Agriculture and Life Sciences
- Faculty of Arts
- Faculty of Chemistry and Chemical Engineering
- Faculty of Civil Engineering, Transportation Engineering and Architecture
- Faculty of Criminal Justice and Security (in Ljubljana)
- Faculty of Electrical Engineering and Computer Science
- Faculty of Economics and Business
- Faculty of Education
- Faculty of Energy Technology
- Faculty of Law
- Faculty of Mechanical Engineering
- Faculty of Medicine
- Faculty of Health Sciences
- Faculty of Organizational Sciences (in Kranj)
- Faculty of Logistics (in Krško and Celje)
- Faculty of Natural Sciences and Mathematics
- Faculty of Tourism (in Brežice)

The university also comprises several associated facilities, including the Maribor University Library, University of Maribor Press, students' dormitories, the Computing Center, the Leon Štukelj Sporting Center, and Postgraduate and Visiting Faculty Home.

== Distinguished faculty ==
- Matjaž Perc, physics
- Oto Luthar, history
- Mylan Engel, philosophy
- Darijan Božič, music
- Zinka Zorko, linguistics
- Majda Pajnkihar, nursing

== Notable alumni ==
- Brigita Brezovac, IFBB professional bodybuilder
- Darko Horvat, politician, Minister of Economy of Croatia
- Feri Horvat, politician
- Drago Jančar, author
- Tina Maze, skiing champion
- Blaž Medvešek, swimming champion
- Ljudmila Novak, politician
- Mária Pozsonec, politician
- Jurij Toplak, lawyer and elections expert

== See also ==
- List of colleges and universities
- Maribor
- University of Ljubljana
- University of Primorska
- University of Nova Gorica
