= Sigma Theta Tau =

International nursing organization

- ΣΘΤ
- Founded: October 4, 1922; 104 years ago Indiana University
- Type: Honor
- Affiliation: ACHS
- Status: Active
- Emphasis: Nursing
- Scope: International
- Motto: "Improving world health through knowledge"
- Colors: Orchid and Fuchsia
- Symbol: Six stars, Lamp of Knowledge
- Flower: Orchid
- Publication: Journal of Nursing Scholarship (JNS), Worldviews on Evidence-Based Nursing
- Chapters: 600
- Members: 135,000 active 525,000 lifetime
- Nickname: Sigmas
- Headquarters: 550 W. North Street; Indianapolis, Indiana 46202; United States
- Website: www.sigmanursing.org

The Sigma Theta Tau International Honor Society of Nursing (ΣΘΤ), also known as Sigma Nursing, is an international honor society for nurses, founded in 1922 and headquartered in Indianapolis, Indiana.

== History ==
In 1922 six Indiana University students at the Indiana University Training School for Nurses (the present-day IU School of Nursing) founded Sigma Theta Tau at their dormitory in Indianapolis, Indiana. They were Dorothy Garrigus Adams, Elizabeth Russell Belford, Edith Moore Copeland, Marie Hippensteel Lingeman, Elizabeth McWilliams Miller, and Mary Tolle Wright

They had the support of the director of the Indiana University Training School for Nurses, Ethel Palmer Clarke (served 1915–1931), who is noted by the Society as being "instrumental" in their endeavor. The founders' vision for the new honor society was to advance the nursing profession as a science, support nursing scholarship, and to recognize its leaders. IU's Alpha chapter was officially chartered on October 4, 1922, with the organization's first national conference held in 1929 in Indianapolis.

In 1936 the organization "funded the first recorded research grant" for nursing in the United States. Since that time the organization has awarded more than $100,000 annually for nursing research around the world. Sigma's Center for Nursing Scholarship was constructed on the IUPUI campus in 1989.

By 2014 the society's membership had grown to 130,000 active members in more than 85 countries and territories. More than 500,000 nurse scholars have been inducted into Sigma. It is the second-largest nursing organization in the world.

== Controversies ==
On September 14, 2026, Sigma Theta Tau placed CEO Luke Davis on paid administrative leave and engaged an external attorney to investigate private communications attributed to him. The allegations concerned the use of racial slurs and sexual references to slavery.

The board subsequently voted unanimously to dismiss Davis after consulting independent legal counsel. Sigma announced a leadership change on September 18 and began a search for an interim chief executive.

The response drew criticism from nurses who called for increased transparency and scrutiny in Sigma Nursing's culture beyond Davis' dismissal.

== Symbols ==
The society's name is derived from the initials of three Greek words Στοργή (Storgé; Love), Θάρρος (Tharos, Courage) and Τιμή (Timé, Honor) Its motto is "Improving world health through knowledge". Its colors are orchid and fuchsia. The symbols of the society are six stars, representing the founders, and the lamp of knowledge. Its flower is the orchid. Its nickname is Sigmas.

== Membership ==
Membership is by invitation to baccalaureate and graduate nursing students, who demonstrate excellence in scholarship, and to nurse leaders exhibiting exceptional achievements in nursing.

Graduate students (master's and doctorate) must have completed half of the nursing curriculum; achieve academic excellence (at schools where a 4.0 grade point average system is used, this equates to a 3.5 or higher); and meet the expectation of academic integrity. They must also be in the top 35 percent of their nursing program cohort.

Nurse leader candidates must be legally recognized to practice nursing in his/her country; have a minimum of a baccalaureate degree or the equivalent in any field; and demonstrate achievement in nursing.

== Initiatives ==
Sigma Theta Tau was one of the first organizations to fund nursing research in the United States. A US $600 grant awarded to Alice Crist Malone of Ohio State University in 1936 supported research to measure student achievement based on new curriculum objectives.

With its chapters and grant partners (corporations, associations, and foundations) the society contributes more than US$650,000 annually to nursing research through grants, scholarships and monetary awards. More than 250 research-oriented educational programs are sponsored or co-sponsored annually by Sigma in the United States and internationally. The honor society has underwritten more than 250 small or "seed" grants, which often begin a whole body of research. These peer-reviewed grants are often the first recognition of potent concepts that eventually lead to major, wide-scale research projects and innovation in the nursing profession.

Sigma also has a nursing research repository, the Virginia Henderson Global Nursing e-Repository, which offers nurses access to nursing research and evidence-based knowledge.

== Chapters ==
Its 600 chapters are located on more than 700 college and university campuses in the United States and countries including Australia, Botswana, Brazil, Canada, Colombia, China (Hong Kong), Eswatini, South Korea, Mexico, Nigeria, the Netherlands, Pakistan, the Philippines, South Africa, Taiwan, Tanzania and the United Kingdom.

== Notable members ==
Sigma Theta Tau has approximately 135,000 active members.

== Publications ==
The society's publishing arm produces two scholarly journals and numerous other publications.

=== Journals ===
- Journal of Nursing Scholarship is the official journal of Sigma Theta Tau. It was originally titled Image when first published starting in 1967, then continued as Image: the journal of nursing scholarship from 1984 until 1999.
- Worldviews on Evidence Based Nursing, a peer-reviewed, evidence-based nursing journal, is a bimonthly primary source of information to improve patient care circulated since 2004. Another periodical of Online journal of knowledge synthesis for nursing.

=== Books ===
Books are published covering the themes among: career advice, clinical information, education resources, leadership support and training, research guides and tools, as well as technology insights and answers contrasted with publications on more general topics related to a nurse's lifestyle, society and culture, target readership consists of clinical nurses and faculty members as well as nurse leaders, from student or new nurse to researchers.

Since 2007, Sigma Theta Tau has been awarded annually a publishing merit by the American Journal of Nursing by the judging board of nursing executives, college professors and clinicians. In 2018, there were two titles awarded.

- Sigma Theta Tau, ed. (2000). " Journal of nursing scholarship. Sigma Theta Tau International.
- Freshwater, Dawn; Taylor, Beverley J. (Beverley Joan); Sherwood, Gwen; Sigma Theta Tau (2008). " International textbook of reflective practice in nursing. Blackwell, Sigma Theta Tau International, Honor Society of Nursing.
- Bick, Debra; Graham, David I. (2010). Evaluating the impact of implementing evidence-based practice. Evidence-based nursing series. Chichester, West Sussex; Indianapolis, Ind.: Wiley-Blackwell, Sigma Theta Tau International Honor Society of Nursing. ISBN 9781405183840. OCLC 463631884.
- Chan, Garrett (2010). Benner, Patricia; Brykczynski, Karen A (eds.). Interpretive phenomenology in health care research : Studying Social Practice, Lifeworlds, and Embodiment. Sigma Theta Tau International, Honor Society of Nursing. ISBN 9781441641090. OCLC 956655196.
- Laura Cullen; Kirsten Hanrahan; Michele Farrington; Jennifer DeBerg; Sharon Tucker; Charmaine Kleiber (2017). Evidence-based practice in action: comprehensive strategies, tools, and tips from the University of Iowa Hospitals and Clinics. University of Iowa Hospitals and Clinics. Sigma Theta Tau International. ISBN 9781940446943. OCLC 985604177. - 2nd Place 2018 AJN Book of the Year
- Tina M Marrelli (1 January 2018). Hospice and Palliative Care Handbook, Third Edition (3rd ed.). Indianapolis: Sigma Theta Tau International. ISBN 9781945157479. OCLC 1031215709. - 2nd Place, 2018 AJN Book of the Year

== See also ==
- American Association of Critical-Care Nurses
- Evidence-Based Nursing
- Honor cords
- List of nursing organizations
- Professional fraternities and sororities
