= Nursing in the United States =

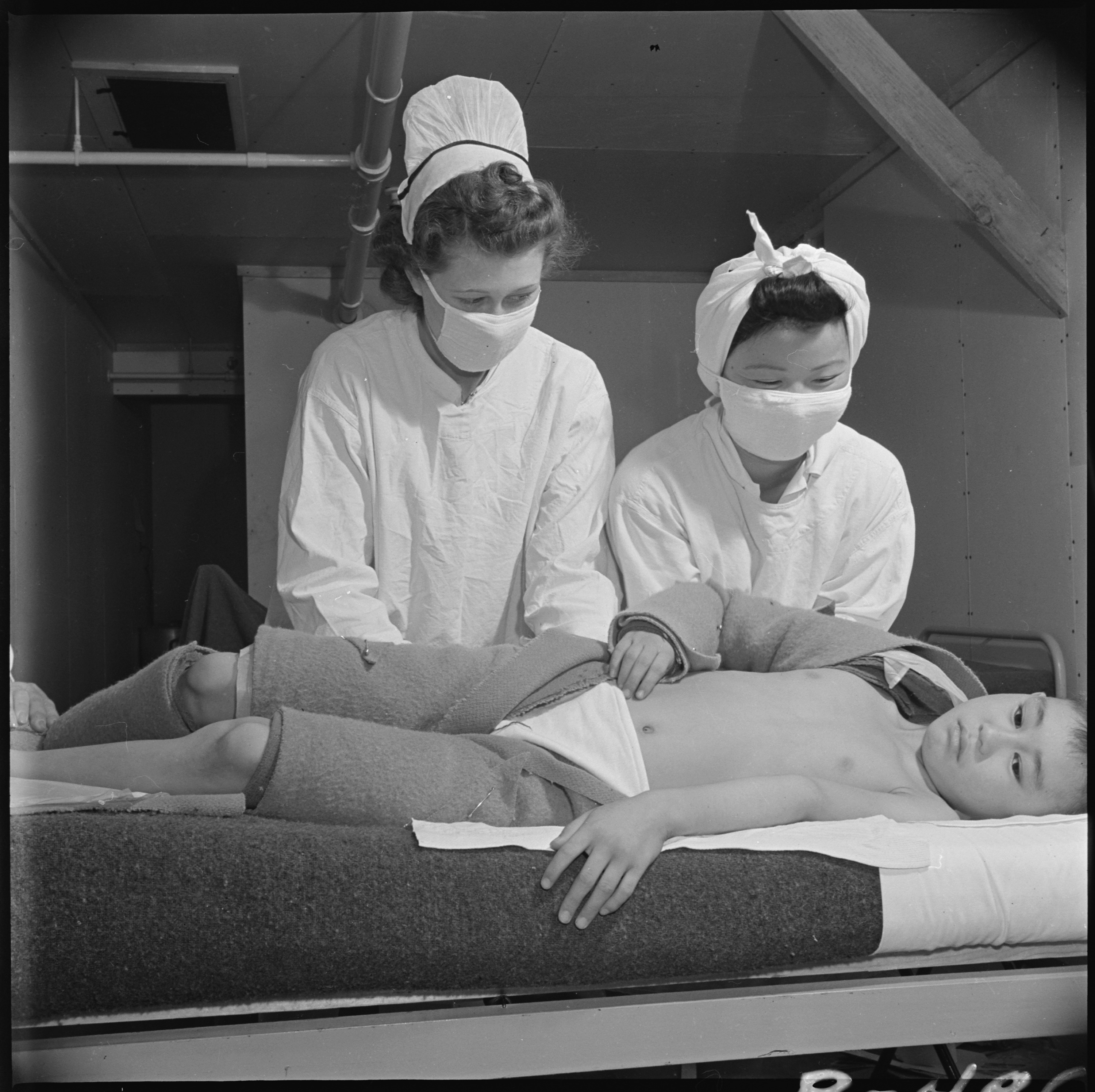
Two nurses in Arizona, 1943

Nursing in the United States is a professional health care occupation. It is the largest such occupation, employing millions of certified professionals. As of 2023, 3,175,390 registered nurses were employed, paid a median income of $86,070.

Nurses are not doctors' assistants and practice nursing in a wide variety of specialties and departments. They may act in that capacity, such as in the emergency department or in trauma care, but more often independently care for their patients or assist other nurses. RNs treat patients, record their medical history, provide emotional support, and provide follow-up care. Nurses also help doctors perform diagnostic tests.

Many nurses work in a hospital setting. Options there include: pediatrics, neonatal, maternity, OBGYN, geriatrics, orthopedics, medical-surgical, operating room, ambulatory, and nurse anesthetists and informatics (eHealth). Other options include community health, mental health, clinical nursing specialists, and nurse midwives.

== History ==
The history of nursing in the United States focuses on the professionalization of Nursing in the United States since the Civil War.

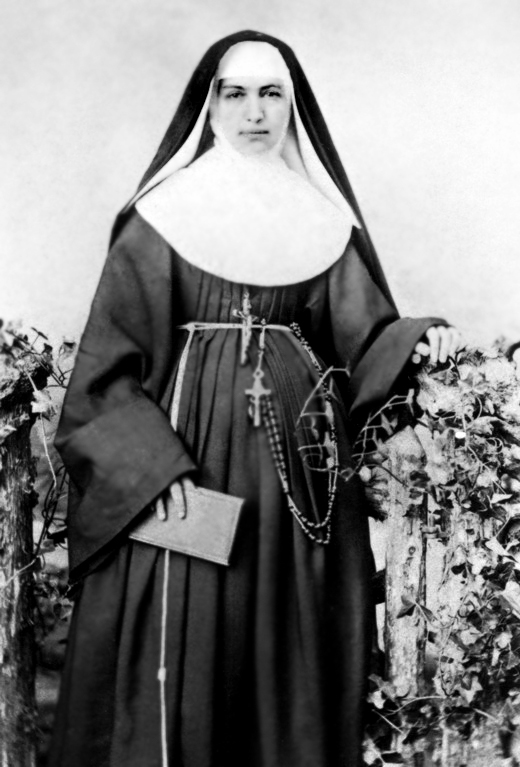
Saint Marianne Cope was among many Catholic nuns to influence the development of modern hospitals and nursing.

== Types of nurses ==
Nursing in the United States is provided by several levels of professional and paraprofessional staff.

| Level | Typical education requirement | Current practitioners | Median annual salary | Scope of practice |
|---|---|---|---|---|
| Certified Nursing Assistant (CNA) | 75-hour vocational course | 1,389,900 | $30,290 (2021) | Certified Nursing Assistants are trained to perform a limited range of procedures in support of Registered Nurses, under whose supervision they are generally required to work. These include taking vital signs, dispensing prescribed medications, bathing patients, and moving patients in wheelchairs. |
| Licensed Practical Nurse (LPN)/Licensed Vocational Nurse (LVN) | 1–2 year vocational diploma program | 657,200 | $48,070 (2021) | In addition to the duties of a CNA, a Licensed Practical Nurse (LPN) is generally also qualified to administer injections, perform therapeutic massage, prepare patients for surgical procedures, maintain patient medical records, change bandages and dressings, and sometimes manage intravenous drips. LPNs are also responsible for communicating a patient's needs to medical staff. In some regions, the equivalent role is termed a Licensed Vocational Nurse (LVN). |
| Registered Nurse (RN) | Diploma in Nursing, Associate of Science (A.S.) in Nursing, Bachelor of Science (B.S.) in Nursing, or Master of Science (M.S.) in Nursing | 3,130,600 | $77,600 (2021) | In addition to the duties of CNAs and LPNs, RNs are qualified to make nursing diagnoses, and to supervise the work of CNAs and LPNs. |
| Advanced Practice Registered Nurse (APRN) | Postgraduate education in specialized aspect of nursing and RN licensure | 300,000 | $123,780 (2021) | Advanced Registered Nurse Practitioners include nurse midwives, nurse practitioners, clinical nurse specialist and nurse anesthetist. |

== Education ==
Nursing schools may be accredited by either the Accreditation Commission for Education in Nursing (ACEN) or the Commission on Collegiate Nursing Education (CCNE).

=== Registered nurse ===
Prerequisites for nursing school vary, but typically include three years of math, three years of science, including biology and chemistry, four years of English and two years of language. Additionally, human development, human anatomy with lab, human physiology with lab, microbiology with lab, nutritional science and English composition may be required. Applicants are usually expected to have earned a high grade point average, especially in anatomy, microbiology, chemistry and physiology.

A typical course of study at any level typically includes such topics as, anatomy and physiology, epidemiology, pharmacology and medication administration, psychology, ethics, nursing theory and legal issues in nursing.

All paths require that the candidate receive clinical training in nursing. Care is delivered by students under academic supervision in hospital and in other practice settings. Clinical courses typically include:

- Maternal-child nursing
- Pediatric nursing
- Adult medical-surgical nursing
- Geriatric nursing
- Psychiatric nursing

Registered nurses generally receive their basic preparation through one of four basic avenues:

==== Diploma ====
Graduation with a three-year certificate from a hospital-based school of nursing. Few of these programs remain in the U.S. and the proportion of nurses practicing with a diploma is rapidly decreasing. Students take between 30 and 60 credit hours in anatomy, physiology, microbiology, nutrition, chemistry, and other subjects at a college or university, then focus on intensive nursing classes. Until 1996, most RNs in the US undertook diploma programs. According to the Health Services Resources Administration's 2000 Survey of Nurses only six percent of nurses who graduated from nursing programs received their education at a Diploma School of Nursing.

==== Associate of Science in Nursing (ASN) ====
Graduation from a degree-granting nursing program conferring an ASN, Associate of Applied Science (AAS), Associate Degree in Nursing (ADN), or Associate in Nursing (AN). This involves two to three years of college level study with a strong emphasis on clinical knowledge and skills. This replaced Diplomas as the most common initial nursing education. Some four-year schools offer the ADN. These programs have prerequisite and corequisite courses (which may include English, Math and Human Anatomy and Physiology) and consume three years or longer.

==== Bachelor of Science in Nursing ====
Graduation from a university, completing a four- or five-year program conferring the BSN or BN degree with enhanced emphasis on leadership and research as well as clinically focused courses. For the first two years, students complete general education requirements along with nursing courses. In some programs an active LPN license can replace the first two years of nursing classes. Advocates for ADN and diploma programs claim that such programs take an on-the-job training approach, and that the BSN should remain an academic degree that emphasizes research and nursing theory. Some states require a specific amount of clinical experience that is the same for both BSN and ADN students. A BSN degree qualifies its holder for administrative, research, consulting and teaching positions not typically available to ADN holders, but is not necessary for most patient care functions.

==== Graduate education ====
Advanced education in nursing includes master's and doctoral degrees. Graduate education prepares the graduate for specialization as an advanced practice registered nurse (APRN) or for advanced roles in leadership, management, or education. The clinical nurse leader (CNL) is an advanced generalist who focuses on the improvement of quality and safety outcomes for patients or patient populations from an administrative and staff management focus.

Generic-entry Master of Science in Nursing: After graduation from a university, a one to three-year program confers the MS/MSN degree with emphasis on leadership and research as well as clinically focused courses for students who hold a bachelor's degree or higher in an academic field other than nursing.

Doctoral programs prepare the student for work in nursing education, health care administration, clinical research, public policy, or advanced clinical practice. Most programs confer the PhD in nursing or Doctor of Nursing Practice (DNP).

Areas of advanced nursing practice include that of a nurse practitioner (NP), a certified nurse midwife (CNM), a certified registered nurse anesthetist (CRNA), or a clinical nurse specialist (CNS). Nurse practitioners and CNSs work assessing, diagnosing and treating patients in fields as diverse as family practice, women's health care, emergency nursing, acute/critical care, psychiatry, geriatrics, or pediatrics, additionally, a CNS usually works for a facility to improve patient care, do research, or as a staff educator.

==== Other ====
Other paths are available. LPNs can become RN's via specific additional education. Accelerated baccalaureate nursing programs take 1.5 to 2 years and prepare people who hold undergraduate degrees in other disciplines, such as respiratory therapists and paramedics/military medics.

Following completion of educational requirements, candidates must pass the National Licensure Examination (NCLEX) test, a standardized exam to become licensed.

Nurses trained in other countries are required to be proficient in English and have their educational credentials evaluated by the Commission on Graduates of Foreign Nursing Schools prior to taking the exam.

Controversy exists over RNs appropriate entry-level preparation. Some professional organizations believe the BSN should be the sole method and that ADN graduates should be licensed as "technical nurses" to work under the supervision of BSN graduates. Others feel the on-the-job experiences of diploma and ADN graduates makes up for any deficiency in theoretical preparation.

=== Advanced education ===
RNs can complete additional education to earn a Master of Science in Nursing or Doctor of Nursing Science to prepare for leadership or advanced practice roles within nursing. Management and teaching positions increasingly require candidates to hold an advanced degree. Many hospitals reimburse tuition costs for such training.

Many nurses pursue specialty certification through professional organizations and certifying bodies.

=== Continuing education ===
Continuing education classes and programs enable nurses to provide the best possible care to patients, advance nursing careers, and keep up with certification requirements. ANCC ensures nurses have access to quality continuing education offerings. Continuing education classes are calibrated to educate all levels of nurses. Many States require continuing education. Nursing licensing boards typically accept courses provided by organizations accredited by other licensing boards, by the ANCC, or its designees. The National Healthcare Institute maintains a list of continuing education requirements.

== Regulation ==
The jurisdiction - state or territory - has authority over nursing practice. The scope of practice is defined by state laws and by regulations, typically administered by state nursing boards.

=== Scope of practice ===
In the US, scope of practice is determined by jurisdiction. Each has its own laws, rules, and regulations that describe what nurses with a given qualification may provide.

Many jurisdictions have adopted the Model Nursing Practice Act and Model Nursing Administrative Rules created by the National Council of State Nursing Boards (NCSNB).

=== Licensing ===
Many jurisdictions model their licensure requirements on the Uniform Core Licensure Requirements, which set forth competency development and competency assessment principles. The American Nurses Credentialing Center (ANCC) is the largest nursing credentialing organization and administers more than 30 specialty examinations.

In many programs, a computerized exam is given before, during, and upon completion to evaluate program outcomes. This exam, upon completion of the nursing program, measures a student's readiness for the NCLEX-RN licensure exam administered through the National Council of State Nursing Boards. Successful completion of NCLEX-RN is required for state licensure as an RN.

Nurses may complete licensing requirements in more than one state. Jurisdictions that adopted the Nurse Licensure Compact accept licenses granted in others without requiring a separate certification.

Licenses must be periodically renewed. Some states require continuing education in order to renew licenses.

== Work sites ==
RNs are employed by physicians, attorneys, insurance companies, governmental agencies, community/public health agencies, private industry, school districts, ambulatory surgery centers, device or pharmaceutical manufacturers, or chemical companies. Some work as independent consultants. Research nurses conduct or assist in research or evaluation in areas such as biology, psychology, human development, and health care systems.

Many employers offer flexible work schedules, child care, educational benefits, and bonuses. About 21 percent of registered nurses are union members or covered by union contract.

=== Correctional nursing ===
The United States needs many correctional nurses to provide proper health-care to inmates, including mental health treatments.

Correctional health care encompasses LPNS, RNs, nurse practitioners, doctors, pharmacists, therapists, and specialists.

Upon an inmate's arrival, nurses perform a basic checkup. They can discover existing conditions. Issues including chronic medical conditions, mental health, infectious disease, and substance abuse. Correctional nurses must follow stricter protocols than in a hospital due to confidentiality. Assessing a patient can be difficult. A deputy or officer may have to be present during exams, which can discomfort the patient, compromising the information provided.

== Diversity ==
As of 2020, in the United States 19.4% of nursing positions were held by people of non-white backgrounds. The remaining 80.6% of positions are held by Caucasians.

=== Gender ===
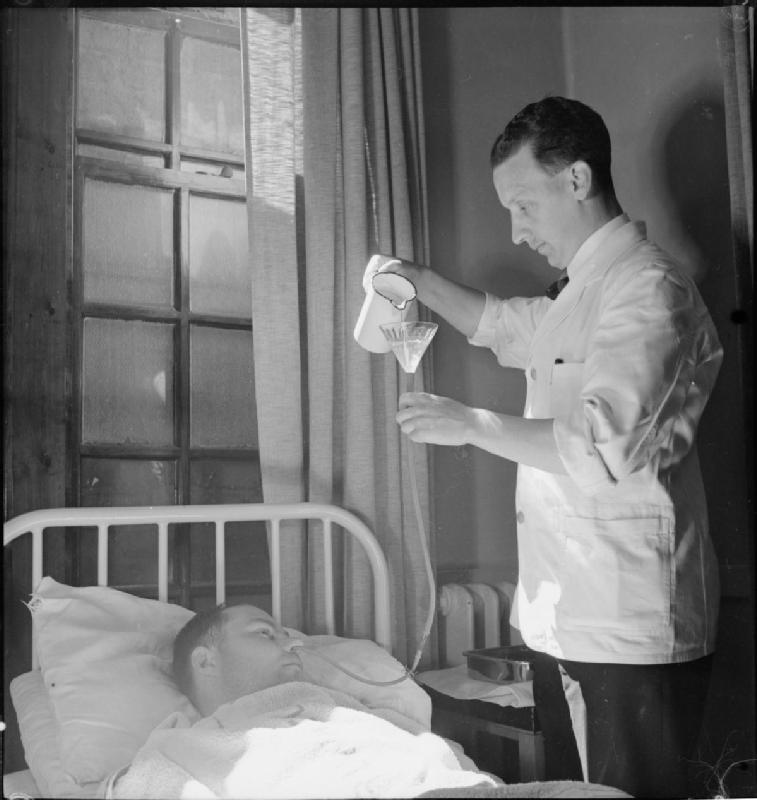
A male nurse at Runwell Hospital, Wickford, Essex, in 1943

Nursing is a female-dominated profession. The male-to-female ratio of nurses is approximately 1:19 in Canada and the United States, despite attempts to correct the imbalance.

== Demand for nurses ==
The number of new graduates and foreign-trained nurses is insufficient to meet the demand for registered nurses, and this negatively affects staffing ratios; this is often referred to as the nursing shortage. One study reported that the nursing shortage is caused by nurses voluntarily leaving the profession. In 2006 it was estimated that approximately 1.8 million licensed nurses chose not to work as a nurse. The Bureau of Labor Statistics (BLS) estimated that by 2020, 1.2 million nursing job openings would be available.

Demand for nurses was projected to increase for the foreseeable future (an increase of 23% between 2006 and 2016, according to the US Department of Labor).

Many nurses claim to be overworked and underpaid, in part because not enough nurses are getting certified, and too many are leaving the profession. Poor working conditions increase stress.

== See also ==
- List of nursing schools in the United States
- History of nursing in the United States
- History of medicine in the United States
