= Graduate nurse =

Nurse who has not completed registration requirements

Graduate Nurse (GN)
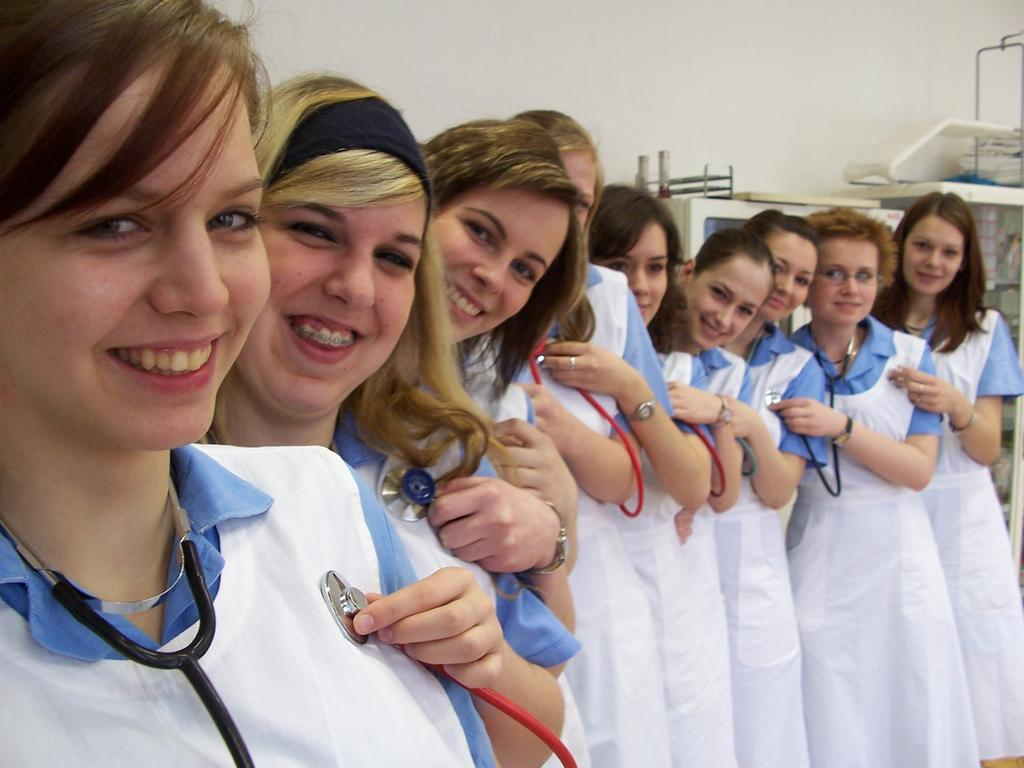
- Nursing school graduation candidates holding the bells of stethoscopes on each other.

Occupation
- Names: Graduate Nurse
- Occupation type: Healthcare professional
- Activity sectors: Health care

Description
- Competencies: The application of principles of Nursing practice to the well-being of patients/clients
- Education required: a graduate of a Nursing Education diploma program, an associate degree in nursing or a Bachelors of Science degree in Nursing; Qualifications in terms of statutory regulations according to national, state, or provincial legislation in each country
- Fields of employment: Hospital, Clinic; Laboratory

The graduate nurse (GN) is a nurse who has completed their academic studies but not completed the requirements to become a registered nurse (RN). Depending on the country, state, province or similar licensing body, the graduate nurse may be granted provisional nursing licensure. A graduate nurse has not yet passed the National Council Licensure Examination (NCLEX-RN) to become a registered nurse (RN).

In some US states, the graduate nurse can practice nursing under a registered nurse. To practice as a graduate nurse, they must have been authorized by the examination provider to sit for the licensed examination and have been provided documentation for their eligibility to take the examination. Those who have been recognized and approved by the State board of Nursing may use the "G.N." status as part of their identification. In Canada and Texas, a student who has successfully completed their nursing education can obtain a distinct licensure as a graduate nurse. This designation remains until the GN successfully passes the RN examinination. In Australia graduate nurses have experienced some issues transitioning from undergraduate to registered nurse.

== See also ==
- Enrolled Nurse Professional Association
- Licensed practical nurse
- Nurse
- Nursing
- Registered nurse (RN)
