= Nurse educator =

Nurse who teaches nursing

A nurse educator is a nurse who teaches and prepares licensed practical nurses (LPN) and registered nurses (RN) for entry into practice positions. They can also teach in various patient care settings to provide continuing education to licensed nursing staff. Nurse Educators teach in graduate programs at Master's and doctoral level which prepare advanced practice nurses, nurse educators, nurse administrators, nurse researchers, and leaders in complex healthcare and educational organizations.

The type of degree required for a nurse educator may be dependent upon the governing nurse practice act or upon the regulatory agencies that define the practice of nursing. In the United States, one such agency is the National Council of State Boards of Nursing. For instance, faculty in the U.S. may be able to teach in an LPN program with an associate degree in nursing. Most baccalaureate and higher degree programs require a minimum of a graduate degree and prefer the doctorate for full-time teaching positions. Many nurse educators have a clinical specialty background blended with coursework in education. Many schools offer the Nurse Educator track which focuses on educating nurses going into any type setting. Individuals may complete a post-Master's certificate in education to complement their clinical expertise if they choose to enter a faculty role.

Nurse educators can choose to teach in a specialized field of their choosing. No additional degrees are required beyond a master's degree in nursing.

In Australia, Nurse Educators must be Registered Nurses (RNs/Division 1 Nurses). The Nurse Educator role is not available to Enrolled Nurses (ENs/Division 2 Nurses). Nurse Educators require a minimum of a Certificate IV in Training and Assessment to teach the Diploma of Nursing in both the classroom and clinical placement settings. Bachelor of Nursing Educators do not technically require this qualification, but it is generally favoured. A Nurse Educator may also complete post-graduate university study in Nursing or Clinical Education, which may lead to an academic career including research, lecturing or doctoral study. To become a Clinical Nurse Educator in a healthcare setting (e.g. on an acute care ward), Registered Nurses are generally required to have 5–10 years clinical experience and 6–8 years of study (a bachelor's degree plus post-graduate certificate or diploma).

== See also ==
- Nurse education
- Nursing school
