= Health professional requisites =

Regulations used by countries

Health professional requisites refer to the regulations used by countries to control the quality of health workers practicing in their jurisdictions and to control the size of the health labour market. They include licensure, certification and proof of minimum training for regulated health professions.

In the health care system, a health professional who offers medical, nursing or other types of health care services is required to meet specific requisites put into effect by laws governing health care practices. The number of professions subject to regulation, the requisites for an individual to receive professional licensure or certification, the scope of practice that is permitted for the individual to perform, and the nature of sanctions that can be imposed for failure to comply vary across jurisdictions.

Most countries have credentialing staff in regulatory boards or health departments who document the certification or licensing of health workers and their work history. The processes for professional certification and licensure vary across professions and countries. Certification to practise a profession usually does not need to be renewed, while a licence usually needs to be periodically renewed based on certain criteria such as passing a renewal exam, demonstrating continuing learning, being employed in the field or simply paying a fee. Most health care industry employers publish the specific requisites for persons seeking employment by means of job boards, ads and solicitations for employment. Practicing health care without the appropriate license is generally a crime.

== Medical practice requisites ==
Most countries require individuals to demonstrate proof of graduation from a recognized medical school, such as one meeting the quality assurance standards of the World Federation of Medical Education, as requisite to obtain professional certification for practice as a physician or physician assistant.

In the United States, once obtaining the appropriate medical degree, physicians can apply to attain licensure via Board certification.

In India, practitioners of both modern medicine and traditional medicine are subject to professional regulation. Doctors are regulated by the Medical Council of India, while practitioners of Ayurved, Siddha and Unani medicine are regulated by the Central Council of Indian Medicine.

== Nursing requisites ==
Registered nurses and licensed practical nurses (or the equivalent national titles, e.g. enrolled nurses) must typically complete nursing school and pass a national examination in order to obtain their license. For example, in the United States, nurses must pass the National Council Licensure EXamination (NCLEX). They must then obtain a nursing license by applying to appropriate board of nursing. In Uganda, nurses must complete a Bachelor of Science or other diploma in nursing recognized by the Nurses and Midwives Council and pass national qualifying examinations; several years of work experience in a hospital or other health unit is further required in order to be eligible for a licence to engage in private practice.

The legal requisites as well as scope of practice for nurses (and also midwives and nurse midwives) vary across countries. For instance, in some countries nurses are trained and authorized to provide emergency childbirth care, including administration of oxytocins and newborn resuscitation, whereas in other countries these clinical functions are only authorized for physicians.

== Respiratory Therapy requisites ==
Respiratory Therapists or Respiratory Care Practitioners in many countries are required to have graduated from an accredited and recognized college or university and additionally pass a registry exam prior to being eligible for licensure. In the United States, Respiratory Therapists are granted either Registry or Certificate credentials by the National Board for Respiratory Care (NBRC). The credential granted by the NBRC must be maintained to continue to hold a state licence to practice, and a fee must be paid every two years to the NBRC to maintain that credential.

== Other professional requisites ==
Dentists and many other categories of allied health professions typically also require professional certification or licensure for legal practice. Training and knowledge in basic life support is required by regulation for certification for many practicing individuals, including emergency medical technicians.

Requisites and regulations for other professions, such as paramedics, clinical officers, dietitians, and homeopaths, vary across countries. They may also vary over time within countries. For example, previously no academic qualifications were needed to work as a Dental nurse in the United Kingdom; however now, hospitals, community dental services and other employers require all Dental nurses to have obtained recognized qualifications and be registered with the General Dental Council.

== Practicing without a license ==
Practicing without a license is typically illegal. In most jurisdictions, individuals found to be providing medical, nursing or other professional services without the appropriate certification or licence may face sanctions including even criminal charges leading to prison. The number of professions subject to regulation and nature of sanctions that can be imposed for failure to comply vary across jurisdictions.

For instance, in the United States, under Michigan state laws, an individual is guilty of a felony if he practices or holds himself out as practicing a health profession subject to regulation without a license or registration or under a suspended, revoked, lapsed, void, or fraudulently obtained license or registration, or exceeding what a limited license or registration allows, or who uses the license or registration of another person as his own. The "practice of medicine" may be defined as any diagnosis, treatment, prevention, cure, or relieving of a human disease, ailment, defect, complaint, or other physical or mental condition, by attendance, advice, device, diagnostic test, or other means, or offering, undertaking, attempting to do, or holding oneself out as able to do, any of these acts.

According to the MDCH the following professions must be licensed for practice in Michigan:

- Acupuncture
- Athletic Trainer
- Audiologist
- Body Art
- Chiropractic
- Counseling
- Dentistry
- Dietetics and Nutrition
- Marriage & Family Therapy
- Massage Therapy
- Medicine
- Nurse Aide
- Nursing
- Nursing Home Administrator
- Occupational Therapy
- Optometry
- Osteopathic Medicine & Surgery
- Pharmacy
- Physical Therapy
- Physician Assistant
- Podiatric Medicine & Surgery
- Psychology
- Respiratory Care
- Sanitarian
- Social Worker
- Speech-Language Pathology
- Veterinary Medicine

In Florida, such crime is classified as a third degree felony, which may give imprisonment up to five years. Practicing a health care profession without a license which results in serious bodily injury classifies as a second degree felony, providing up to 15 years' imprisonment.

In the United Kingdom, healthcare professionals are regulated by the state; the Council for Healthcare Regulatory Excellence oversees the work of various regulatory bodies including the Nursing and Midwifery Council, the General Dental Council, and the Health Professions Council (HPC). Each Council protects the 'title' of each profession it regulates. For example, it is illegal for someone to call themself an Occupational Therapist or Radiographer if they are not on the register held by the HPC.

Similarly, in South Africa, at least 12 professional titles are protected by law, subject to regulation by the Health Profession Council of South Africa.

In Uganda, a person who calls themself a "nurse" or "midwife" without having the appropriate licence from the Nurses and Midwives Council can be subject to a fine and/or up to three years of imprisonment.

== See also ==
- Credentialism and degree inflation
- Health professionals
- Health workforce
- Allied health professions
- Unlicensed assistive personnel
