= Pediatric nurse practitioner =

Specialized type of nurse practitioner

Occupation
- Occupation type: Profession
- Activity sectors: Healthcare, advanced practice registered nurse

Description
- Education required: Master's or doctorate degree
- Related jobs: Nurse midwife, nurse anesthetist, clinical nurse specialist

A pediatric nurse practitioner (PNP) is a nurse practitioner who specializes in care for newborns, infants, toddlers, preschoolers, school-aged children, adolescents, and young adults. Nurse practitioners have an in-depth knowledge and experience in pediatric healthcare including well childcare, and prevention/management of common pediatric acute illnesses and chronic conditions. This care is provided to support optimal health of children within their community. In order to be a pediatric nurse practitioner, one must be compassionate, resourceful, good at communicating and have good attention to detail.

== Education ==
Becoming a pediatric nurse practitioner can take anywhere from 7–10 years, depending on the route taken. First, one must earn a Bachelor of Science in Nursing (BSN) by attending a four-year bachelor's degree program at an accredited college or university, majoring in nursing. After completing their BSN, they must take the National Council Licensure Examination (NCLEX) to obtain their registered nurse (RN) license. After completing and passing the NCLEX, they must gain experience in the nursing field, preferably in pediatrics. Recommended experience is anywhere from 1–3 years. Then, they must apply and be accepted to a nurse practitioner program that specializes in pediatrics. They can either earn a Master of Science in Nursing (MSN), a two-year program, or a Doctor of Nursing Practice (DNP), which is a three-year program. Both programs qualify one to become a nurse practitioner, but salaries can increase with degree level. Most programs require a BSN, two years of RN experience, with at least one year being in pediatrics, and a minimum GPA of 3.0. Finally, in order to become a pediatric nurse practitioner, they must pass a certification exam offered by the Pediatric Nursing Certification Board. Many specialty careers are options are available in Neo natal, family practice and hospitals.

== Duties ==
Pediatric nurse practitioners deliver care across the country to children aging from newborn to 21. Most PNPs practice on all pediatric ages but some specialize in specific age groups such as adolescents or neonatal. Nurse practitioners are able to prescribe medications in all 50 states however, each state has different guidelines for practice and prescription abilities. Pediatric nurse practitioners are capable of performing many tasks other pediatricians and physicians perform. These tasks include developmental screenings, physical assessments (vision, hearing and dental), school and sport physicals, vaccines and diagnosing common childhood illnesses such as allergies, ear infections and skin conditions. PNPs also diagnose chronic diseases like asthma and diabetes, provide advice on common health concerns like obesity, and treat unintentional and sports injuries. Nurse practitioners are also able to order diagnostic tests and perform small procedures, including but not limited to suturing, starting IVs, administering medications and wound care. Some of these illnesses are still newer to the childcare environment. Having certain childhood illnesses can be extreme and effect later life or even the patient's daily life. PNPs are shown to give high quality care to their patients and is a vital role in dealing with the chronic and critical health conditions of their patients.

== Job location ==
Pediatric nurse practitioners practice in a wide variety of settings across the world with very diverse populations of patients, they also work independently for the most part but occasionally partner with other physicians. Pediatric nurse practitioners can work in privately owned offices, clinics, surgery centers, hospitals or other pediatricians' offices. PNPs also regularly work in pediatric intensive/ critical care units, emergency departments and urgent care facilities. The states with a higher concentration of PNPs is mainly in the Northeast and in the Midwest. The state with a higher concentration includes states such as West Virginia, Idaho, New Mexico, and many others. These states also have the most children living in the states with more than 3,000 per physician.

Pediatrics and child health is practiced in the United Kingdom under paediatrics (British English) A paediatric nurse is also referred to as a school nurse, who play a crucial role in sustaining the health and wellness of children in their communities.

== Important character traits ==
In order to be a pediatric nurse practitioner, there are certain character traits that will set a PNP apart and help give them an advantage in their field. Pediatric nurse practitioners work with other health care providers, parents, family members and children on a daily basis. Having good communication skills will help them work with multiple different people per every patient seen. Good communication plays a large part in correctly diagnosing and treating patients. Pediatric nurse practitioners must also have compassion, empathy and patience for their patients and the patient's family members. Pediatric nurse practitioners or pediatricians are often the first healthcare professional that children see, having a good or bad experience plays a major role in that patient's viewpoint of healthcare workers for the rest of their lives, so whether a pediatric nurse practitioner has these qualities or not, it can change patients' lives for years to come.

== Workplace challenges and benefits ==
Just like every other job being a pediatric nurse practitioner comes with benefits and challenges. Nurse practitioners have health and dental insurance, paid time off, tuition reimbursement and a high average salary. On top of these benefits being a nurse practitioner has a very high job outlook and high job satisfaction. Some of the challenges of being a nurse practitioner is a lengthy schooling process, challenging and physically demanding work schedule and legal responsibilities for diagnosis decisions. The healthcare workforce is workspace where it is needed to work together as one due to all the aspects that could be put into one patient and to meet the challenges given. There are problems which healthcare is currently dealing with such as the right clinical experiences, right time of efficiencies and the funding. There is needed support to help with the development and how to keep the PNP programs continuing. The clinicals need to be done at different settings like rural and low-income areas to increase to experience of the students and what they would have to deal with. There also needs a to be a promotion of these for the immersion and post-graduate experiences. Due to the health care reform, there is expected to be a larger increase in patients seeking care due to the advance of health insurance coverages. Some children who are in need of care cannot receive it to do the demand of healthcare is increasing as a whole. This is more common in low income and rural areas.

== Salary and job outlook ==
Nurse practitioners have a high average salary. Although salary can vary widely depending on location and job site, a nurse practitioners average salary is $121,659 annually. Salary can also vary depending on specialty, based on the continued education required in order to accomplish that specialty. Pediatric nurse practitioners are among the highest paid in the United States with an average annual salary at $128,057. The employment of nurse practitioners is expected to grow 45% over the next 10 years, which is much faster than the average for most other jobs. Demand for nurse Practitioners is expected to grow by over 50% between the years of 2019 and 2029. Nurse practitioners have a high average salary. Neo natal pediatric nurse practitioners that specialize in working with the most vulnerable newborn babies are expected annual salary of 113,000 on average
