= Minnesota Advanced Practice Registered Nursing =

Advanced Practice Registered Nurse (APRN) refers to a nurse with advanced education, typically at least a master's degree, and certification by a national certifying program. The APRN provides specialized and multifaceted care and are able to do 60 to 80 percent of preventative and primary care done by physicians. Minnesota Statutes section 148.171, subd. 3 states that in Minnesota, APRN "means an individual licensed as a registered nurse by the board, and certified by a national nurse certification organization acceptable to the board to practice as a clinical nurse specialist, nurse anesthetist, nurse midwife, or nurse practitioner".

By passing The Advanced Practice Nurse Act of 1999, The Minnesota Nurses Association (MNA) specified the following nurses as APRNs: Clinical Nurse Specialist (CNS), Nurse Practitioner (NP), Certified Registered Nurse Anesthetist (CRNA), and Certified Nurse‐Midwife (CNM). APRNs must practice within the scope of their own practice through diagnosis and treatment, consulting, collaborating with other health care providers, and coordinating care. They are not necessarily required to have physician supervision, as APRNs can practice under their own independent scopes of practice, but must have a plan for when care or patient concerns exceed the scope of his or her knowledge. Employers may also place additional restrictions on their employed APRNs, as long as they do not conflict with the Minnesota state law.

In 2009, leaders from every APRN organization met to discuss the many legislative, regulatory, and institutional barriers that were preventing Minnesota citizens from having full access to high quality, cost-effective health care services provided by APRNs. The MN APRN Coalition represents the following APRN groups; Association of Southeastern Minnesota Nurse Practitioners, Minnesota Association of Nurse Anesthetists, Minnesota Affiliate of the American College of Nurse Midwives, Minnesota Affiliate of the National Association of Clinical Nurse Specialists, Minnesota Chapter of National Association of Pediatric Nurse Practitioners, Minnesota Nurses Association APRN Task Force, Minnesota Nurse Practitioners, Northern Nurse Practitioner Association, Third District Nurses of the Minnesota Nurses Association – NP Task Force. The mission of the MN APRN Coalition is to improve patient access to, and choice of, safe, cost-effective healthcare providers by removing statutory, regulatory, and institutional barriers that prevent APRNs from practicing at the highest level of their education.

On May 13, 2014, Governor Mark Dayton signed Minnesota’s Senate Bill 511 into law, which increased consumer access to health care and reduced unnecessary healthcare costs by giving full practice authority (FPA) to all APRNs in Minnesota. In January 2015, new legislation went into effect which allows an APRN to practice independently after one year of practice with a collaborative agreement with a physician. The Minnesota Medical Association (2014) states that the APRN must undergo 2080 hours of integrative practice with a physician prior to being able to practice independently. This will allow much more coverage of rural and underserved areas where there may be a lack of primary care physicians

In addition to this legislation, an advisory board was developed, composed of APRNs and physicians, to provide oversight and guidance of APRNs. Minnesota marks the 20th state allowing APRNs to practice independently. The one exception to this independent practice involves the CRNA who treats acute and chronic pain. The CRNA must have a collaboration plan and a prescriptive agreement with a physician in the same practice. According to the Minnesota Medical Association (2014), "This bill is not what physician groups wanted but the final version did include a number of changes that the MMA requested." The Office of Rural Health and Primary Care at the Minnesota Department of Health has stressed that APRNs have enhanced cost-effectiveness by expanding the scope of services available to the patients in education, counseling, and disease prevention.

== Education and Certification in Minnesota ==
APRNs are required to fill an application to the State of Minnesota, have a current Minnesota RN license, complete a graduate level APRN program, and show evidence of current certification by a national certifying body. The renewal for registration is required every two years after initial registration. The renewal process consists of a renewal application, current Minnesota RN license, and evidence of current certification by a national certifying body.

APRNs are registered nurses with advanced training in health assessment, physiology and pharmacology. The Minnesota Board of Nursing holds the responsibility for regulating APRNs working within the state. The Minnesota Board of Nursing holds APRN national certification organization responsibility for ensuring that the APRNs certify they have completed the necessary advanced practice training. There are not written educational standards for the APRNs in the Minnesota. Once the national certification organization has certified the nurse as qualified to practice within the APRN title, the Board accepts this certification as proof that the nurse has completed the necessary training.

To become an APRN, a registered nurse must complete at least a master's degree or post-master's certificate. The educational standards for national certification agencies for various APRN titles vary. Nurse Practitioners are accredited by National League for Nursing Accrediting commission (NLNAC) or the Commission on Collegiate Nursing Education (CCNE). If a graduate program is nationally accredited, it meets the educational standards of the Minnesota Board of Nursing. Approved national certification agencies for NPs include: American Nurses Credentialing Center (ANCC), Pediatric Nursing Certification Board (PNCB), National Certification Corporation (NCC), American Academy of Nurse Practitioners (AANP), and the American Association of Critical Care -Nurses Certification Corporation (AACN).

== Prescriptive authority ==
Prescriptive authority, as defined in the Minnesota Pharmacy Act (Statute 151.37) and the Prescribing Drugs and Therapeutic Devices Act (Statute 148.235), is the legal authorization to prescribe, procure, sign for, record, administer, and dispense over the counter, legend, and controlled substances, including sample drugs. It authorizes the initiation of a therapeutic regimen that includes ordering and prescribing durable medical devices and equipment, nutrition, diagnostic services, and supportive services, and institute therapy or referrals of patients to health care agencies and providers; The authority for a provider to prescribe, administer, and dispense a legend drug, may cause the same to be administered by a nurse, physician assistant, or medical student or resident under the practitioner's direction and supervision.

In order for an advanced practice nurse to gain prescriptive authority in the state of Minnesota, the APRN needs to have graduated from an accredited school of nursing program and passed a national certificate exam in at least one specialty area, such as nurse practitioner, nurse anesthetist, or nurse midwife. Depending on the specialty, APRNs may be required to take certain coursework in topics such as assessment, pharmacology, indications, or dosages. Some hospitals may also require APRNs to have additional hospital privileges in order to prescribe for hospitalized patients. All pharmacies will require APRNs with prescribing privileges to have Drug Enforcement Administration (DEA) registration numbers if they are prescribing controlled substances. Any part of a nurse's scope of practice, including prescriptive authority, can be restricted by the APRN’s employer.

The requirement for a written agreement was the result of a close association between the Minnesota Nurses Association and the Minnesota Medical Association. These agreements can be formed between a nurse practitioner and a physician from any specialty, not just the specialty of the APRN. The record of the agreement is kept at the APRNs place of employment, and according to the Minnesota Statute, Chapter 148.235, it must contain the following components: educational background and credentials of the APRN and specialty of the physician, location of practice and description of the patient population the APRN will be responsible for, how to refer for consultation or communicate with collaborating physician, delineation of what classes of medications the APRN will prescribe, agreement renewal requirements, and a plan to provide patients with care if the agreement is terminated. Agreements should be reviewed periodically for adherence to the statute and must meet requirements set forth by the Minnesota Nurses’ Association.

Unlike the prescriptive agreement that is not kept with the Board of Nursing (BON), Statute 148.235 of the Prescribing Drugs and Therapeutic Devices Act requires any and all of the APRNs DEA registration records and numbers be maintained with the BON. In order to prescribe controlled substances, the APRN must have been issued a DEA number and comply with all federal DEA requirements related to controlled substances. Applying for a DEA number requires the APRN to submit their APRN license, personal information, background information, and an application fee. Applications are good for three years.
