= Family nurse practitioner =

Type of certified nurse practitioner

Family Nurse Practitioner
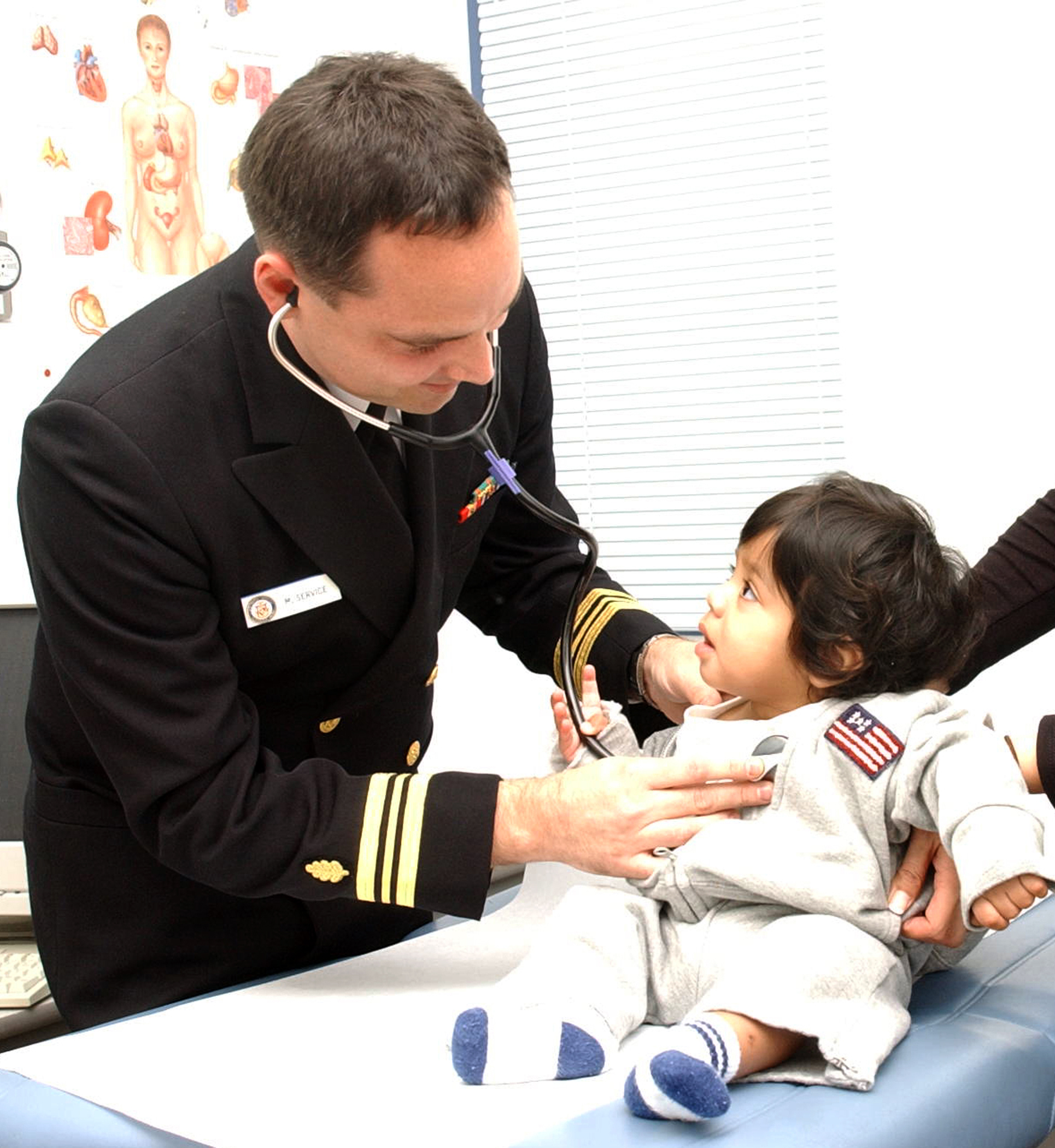
- Family Nurse Practitioner Lt. Cmdr. Michael Service cares for a young girl at the U.S. Naval Hospital (USNH) Yokosuka.

Occupation
- Occupation type: Profession
- Activity sectors: Advanced Practice Registered Nurse, Family Medicine

Description
- Education required: Master of Science in Nursing (MSN) or Doctor of Nursing Practice (DNP)
- Related jobs: nurse midwife, nurse anesthetist, clinical nurse specialist

A family nurse practitioner (FNP) provides continuing and comprehensive healthcare for the individual and family across all ages, genders, diseases, and body systems. Primary care emphasizes the holistic nature of health and it is based on knowledge of the patient in the context of the family and the community, emphasizing disease prevention and health promotion.

This history of this role began in the 1960s when health care planners and legislators determined that primary health care was not meeting the immediate demands of the United States' citizens. Medical schools were given money to start family practice programs to meet this need, and the practice movement began to grow.

== Education and board certification ==
Following educational preparation at the master's or doctoral level, FNPs must become board certified by an approved certification body. Board certification must be maintained by obtaining continuing nursing education credits. In the US, board certification is provided either through the American Nurses Credentialing Center (awards the FNP-BC credential) or through the American Association of Nurse Practitioners certification program (awards the NP-C credential).

== Becoming a family nurse practitioner ==
Before becoming a family nurse practitioner, a person must graduate from a four-year college or university nursing program that is accredited by American Association of Colleges of Nursing (AACN) or the National League for Nursing (NLN). This would result in a Bachelor of Science in nursing from the college or university. Next, a person would need to pass the RN licensing exam, which is the NCLEX (National Council Licensure Examination). After passing this exam, the person is a Registered Nurse and is able to enter the work force. Most nurses work for a few years in the field before pursuing further education.

After completion of this prior work, a person can apply to and obtain a master's or doctoral degree from a family nurse practitioner program. The program should be accredited by the Commission of Collegiate Nursing Education (CCNE) or the Accreditation Commission for Education in Nursing (ACEN).

A family nurse practitioner may work in a variety of clinical settings, utilizing their skill set as primary care clinicians in collaboration with others.

== Scope of practice ==
FNPs deliver a range of episodic acute illness typically treated in the outpatient or urgent care setting, and chronic and preventive healthcare services. In addition to diagnosing and treating illness, they also provide preventive care, including routine checkups, health-risk assessments, immunization and screening tests, and personalized counseling on maintaining a healthy lifestyle. FNPs also manage chronic illness, often coordinating care provided by specialty physicians. FNP scope of practice does not include the clinical management of acutely ill deteriorating patients such as those requiring care in the intensive care unit.

== See also ==
- Advanced practice registered nurse
- Family medicine
