= Nurse registry =

List of licensed nurses

A nurse registry, nursing registry, or register of nurses is a list of nurses who are legally licensed to practice nursing. The register is maintained by the licensing body designated by law to regulate the profession. This is the source of the legal title "Registered Nurse". Usually each nurse is issued a unique identification or license number.

In the United States, the term nurse registry is also commonly used to refer to a nursing agency, a private business which provides per diem or locum tenens nursing personnel to hospitals, medical offices and individuals.

Nurse registries are also companies who provide referrals to patients for skilled and unskilled nursing care. These companies maintain lists of nursing personnel, whom they ensure have the proper licensing and training, that they use to refer nurses acting as independent contractors to patients.

Florence Nightingale opposed a single, nationalized registry of nurses. She notes that a single nationalized register would quickly go out of date, harming newly trained nurses and lending legitimacy to trained nurses who later proved ill-equipped for the job. At the time, the length and quality of training varied widely. The register proposed by the British Nurses' Association did not list any details of the training a nurse had received. Nightingale believed nursing should be autonomous as a profession, rather than under the control of physicians. Half of the BNA's seats were to be given to doctors. Nightingale led several campaigns against the BNA. Despite Nightingale's opposition, the campaign for a national register of nurses ultimately succeeded. The Nurses Registration Act 1919, presented by Health Minister Christopher Addison and receiving Royal Assent on 23 December 1919, established for the first time a statutory register of nurses in England and Wales under the newly created General Nursing Council (GNC). The register opened in November 1921, with nurse Ethel Gordon Fenwick, who had led the registration campaign for decades, becoming the first state-registered nurse in the United Kingdom. The register maintained separate sections for general nursing, mental nursing, mental deficiency nursing, fever nursing, paediatric nursing, and male nurses. By 1923, only 12,097 nurses had been registered, in part because of stringent vetting procedures. The GNC was replaced in 1983 by the United Kingdom Central Council for Nursing, Midwifery and Health Visiting, and later by the current Nursing and Midwifery Council, established in 2002.

== See also ==
- Board of nursing
