= HESI exam =

US company offering nursing exams and materials

Health Education Systems Incorporated (HESI) is a United States company that provides exams and other study material to help prepare nursing and allied health students for their professional licensure exams. Schools often use HESI exams to help predict the student's likelihood of success in tests such as the NCLEX-RN.

HESI was acquired by Elsevier in 2006.

== Admission Assessment (A^{2}) ==
The HESI Admission Assessment (A^{2}) is a standardized, computer-based admission test used by some nursing and allied health programs.

The exam is 285 minutes (4 hours and 45 minutes) and consists of 275 scored questions. There are eight topics covered in separate subtests: grammar, reading comprehension, vocabulary and general knowledge, basic math skills, anatomy and physiology, biology, and chemistry.

== Exit Exam (E^{2}) ==
Many schools use the HESI Exit Exam (E^{2}) to assess students preparedness for the NCLEX exam. E^{2} results also have a role in assessing the effectiveness of the school's curriculum and faculty.

== See also ==
- Nursing education
- Professional licensure in the United States
- Test of Essential Academic Skills
