= ENPA =

ENPA may refer to:

- Enrolled Nurse Professional Association, an Australian nurse association
- European Newspaper Publishers' Association, a newspaper publishing advocacy association
