= James Sandler =

American investigative journalist

James Sandler is an American investigative journalist who was part of the New York Times team that won the 2004 Pulitzer Prize for Public Service. His work has appeared in the New York Times, the San Francisco Chronicle, Salon, on the CBS Evening News with Dan Rather and on PBS Frontline.

Sandler was born and raised in St. Louis, Missouri, where he attended Ladue Horton Watkins High School. Sandler dropped out of high school at the age of 16 and received his GED. He eventually graduated from the University of Florida in Gainesville with a degree in psychology, and subsequently obtained a master's degree in journalism from the University of California at Berkeley.

While at Berkeley, Sandler worked closely with Lowell Bergman, a former 60 Minutes producer who was portrayed by Al Pacino in the movie, The Insider. Following up on a tip provided by Bergman, Sandler and another student, Robin Stein, developed a story about deaths, injuries and environmental violations at a nationwide water and sewer pipe foundry. The New York Times hired Sandler and Stein to work with its reporters and continue their reporting.

The story, called “Dangerous Business,” appeared as a three-day series on the front page of the New York Times in January 2003, and as a documentary on PBS Frontline. It won the 2004 Pulitzer Prize for Public Service, the 2004 Alfred I. duPont-Columbia University Award/Silver Baton, the 2004 Harvard University Goldsmith Prize for Investigative Reporting, the 2003 George Foster Peabody Award, and the 2003 Investigative Reporters and Editors Award for Investigative Network Television.

Sandler left journalism in 2008 to pursue a career in health care. He earned a master's degree in nursing from Vanderbilt University in Nashville, Tennessee, and currently works as a Family Nurse Practitioner.
