= Clinical nurse leader =

Nursing role in the US

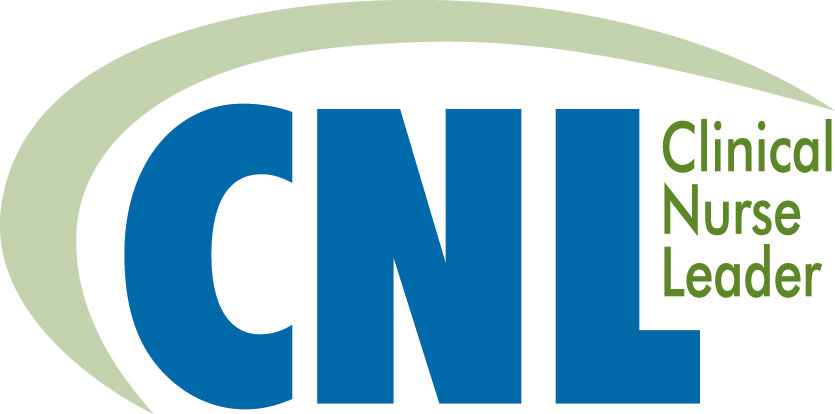

Clinical Nurse Leader (CNL) is a nursing role that was developed in the United States to prepare highly skilled nurses focused on the improvement of quality and safety outcomes for patients or patient populations. The CNL is a registered nurse, with a Master of Science in Nursing who has completed advanced nursing coursework, including classes in pathophysiology, clinical assessment, finance management, epidemiology, healthcare systems leadership, clinical informatics, and pharmacology. CNLs are healthcare systems specialists that oversee patient care coordination, assess health risks, develop quality improvement strategies, facilitate team communication, and implement evidence-based solutions at the unit (microsystem) level. CNLs often work with clinical nurse specialists to help plan and coordinate complex patient care.

== Curriculum and certification ==
The American Association of the Colleges of Nursing (AACN) delineates revised and updated competencies, curriculum development, and required clinical experiences expected of every graduate of a CNL master's education program, along with the minimum set of clinical experiences required to attain the end of program competencies. The Commission on Nurse Certification (CNC), an autonomous arm of the AACN, provides certification for the Clinical Nurse Leader.

The AACN, along with nurse executives and nurse educators designed the Clinical Nurse Leader role (the first new role in nursing in 35 years) in response to the Institute of Medicine's (IOM) comprehensive report on medical errors, To Err is Human: Building a Safer Health System, released in November 1999. The report, extrapolating data from two previous studies, estimates that somewhere between 44,000 and 98,000 Americans die each year as a result of medical errors.

=== History ===
Joint participation by education and practice leaders was instrumental in the successful creation of the CNL role. Among stakeholders joining the AACN on the Implementation Task Force (ITF) were the American Organization of Nurse Executives (AONE) and the Department of Veteran Affairs (DVA). Within the healthcare system, the need for nurses with the skill and knowledge set of the CNL had already been identified and nurses were completing both academic and clinical work without receiving recognition for the advanced competencies being acquired. The first CNL certification exam was held in April and May 2007. In July 2007, AACN Board of Directors approved the revised white paper on the Education and Role of the Clinical Nurse Leader. Currently, 2500 CNLs have been certified and are able to use the credential and title of CNL.
