= Master of Science in Nursing =

Postgraduate degree for registered nurses

A Master of Science in Nursing (MSN) is an advanced-level postgraduate degree for registered nurses and is considered an entry-level degree for nurse educators and managers. The degree may also prepare a nurse to seek a career as a nurse administrator, health policy expert, or clinical nurse leader. The MSN may be used as a prerequisite for doctorate-level nursing education and is the minimum degree required to become an advanced practice registered nurse such as a nurse practitioner, clinical nurse specialist, nurse anesthetist, or nurse midwife.

This graduate-level degree may focus on one or more of many different advanced nursing specialties such as acute care, adult, family, gerontology, neonatology, pediatric, psychiatric, or women's health.

More recently, universities have begun to offer Master of Science pre-registration nursing courses, which cover the registration process and nurse training of the undergraduate course, but with master's-level academic components. This course was initially started at the University of the West of Scotland in the UK and has since been included at other universities.

== See also ==
- Associate of Science in Nursing
- Bachelor of Science in Nursing
- Diploma in Nursing
- Doctor of Nursing Practice
- National League for Nursing Accrediting Commission
- Nurse education
- Nursing school
