= Test of Essential Academic Skills =

Standardized exam for nursing and allied health program students

- Acronym: TEAS
- Type: Computer-based or paper-based standardized test
- Administrator: Assessment Technologies Institute (ATI)
- Skills tested: English and language usage, reading, science, and mathematics.
- Purpose: Admission to nursing or allied health programs
- Duration: 3 hours and 29 minutes
- Languages: English
- Website: www.atitesting.com/teas

The Test of Essential Academic Skills (TEAS Test) is a standardized, multiple choice entrance exam for students applying to nursing and allied health programs in the United States. It is often used to determine the preparedness of potential students to enter into a nursing or allied health program. The test is created and administered by Assessment Technologies Institute (ATI). The test can be taken as a proctored exam at an educational institution that offers it, at certain testing centers, or as a remote-proctored test through ATI.

== History ==
In 1999, ATI commissioned University of Kansas professors John Poggio and Douglas Glasnapp to develop the first TEAS. Since then, the test has undergone several changes and revisions. On August 31, 2016, the TEAS V test was retired in favor of the newest version called ATI TEAS 6. ATI announced the ATI TEAS 6 would be retired in June 2022 and be replaced with the ATI TEAS 7. While the difficulty is essentially the same, all components were updated to the latest education standards, the number of questions in each section were changed, and alternate item format questions (including select all that apply, supply answer, "hot spot", and ordered response items) are now included on the exam in addition to multiple choice questions.

== Exam content ==
The exam is 209 minutes and consists of 170 items (150 scored items and 20 unscored items), drawn from a TEAS Test Bank consisting of thousands of questions that are given on several versions of the exam. The topics covered are reading, mathematics, science, and English language and usage.

The reading section consists of 45 items and tasks students with interpreting passages and visual data. The mathematics section consists of 38 items and tests students' knowledge of algebra, measurements, and data application. The science section consists of 50 items and evaluates students' knowledge of human biology, life science, and physical science. The English language and usage section consists of 37 items and tests grammar and spelling.

As of the release of the ATI TEAS Version 7 the addition of Chemistry and Biology was included as a subcategory of the Science section of the exam.
