= Doctor of Nursing Practice =

Terminal professional degree in nursing

A Doctor of Nursing Practice (DNP) is a professional doctorate in nursing offered in the United States.

The DNP degree was first offered by the University of Kentucky College of Nursing in 2001. It was officially endorsed in 2004 as a practice-focused doctoral degree by the American Association of Colleges of Nursing, recommending transitioning advanced practice nursing preparation from the master's level to the DNP degree by 2015.

== Overview ==
=== United States ===
In the United States, the DNP is one of three doctoral degrees in nursing, the other two being the research degree Doctor of Philosophy (PhD) and the Doctor of Nursing Science (D.N.S. or D.N.Sc.). The DNP program may include clinical/residency hours as well as a final scholarly project.

The curriculum for the United States DNP degree builds on work completed during previous master's-level courses. It provides education in evidence-based practice, quality improvement, and systems leadership, and is typically more clinically oriented than a PhD. Although approximately 52% of nurse anesthetist programs will award the DNP, the remaining 48% may use the title doctor of nurse anesthesia practice (DNAP).

==== Rationale for the existence of the DNP ====
According to the American Association of Colleges of Nursing (AACN), transitioning advance practice registered nursing programs from the graduate level to the doctoral level is a "...response to changes in health care delivery and emerging health care needs, additional knowledge or content areas have been identified by practicing nurses. In addition, the knowledge required to provide leadership in the discipline of nursing is so complex and rapidly changing that additional or doctoral level education is needed." According to the AACN, "...benefits of practice-focused doctoral programs include:

- development of needed advanced competencies for increasingly complex clinical, faculty and leadership roles;
- enhanced knowledge to improve nursing practice and patient outcomes;
- enhanced leadership skills to strengthen practice and health care delivery;
- better match of program requirements and credits and time with the credential earned;
- provision of an advanced educational credential for those who require advanced practice knowledge but do not need or want a strong research focus (e.g. clinical faculty);
- enhanced ability to attract individuals to nursing from non-nursing backgrounds;
- increased supply of faculty for clinical instruction; and
- improved image of nursing."

==== Transitioning toward the doctorate ====
In the United States, the American Association of Colleges of Nursing (AACN) recommended that all entry-level nurse practitioner educational programs be transitioned from the Master of Science in Nursing (MSN) degree to the DNP degree. The American Association of Nurse Anesthetists has followed suit, requiring the DNP (or DNAP - Doctor of Nurse Anesthesia Practice) degree for entry-level nurse anesthetist programs by the year 2025. Meanwhile, the National Association of Clinical Nurse Specialists (NACNS) announced in July 2015 its endorsement of the doctor of nursing practice (DNP) as the required degree for CNS entry into practice by 2030. Nurse practitioners and nurse anesthetists currently practicing with either an MSN or certificate will not be required to obtain the DNP for continued practice.

=== Singapore ===
In August 2025, the National University of Singapore (NUS) launched the country's first DNP, which is designed to enable practising nurses to lead system-level improvements in healthcare, shape policy and enhance service delivery while continuing clinical work. It is offered at NUS' Alice Lee Centre for Nursing Studies (NUS Nursing).

== Comparison to other doctorates ==
The DNP, as a professional degree, has a different focus from a research doctorate such as the PhD in Nursing. The DNP is a practice-focused degree intended to prepare nurses to practice at a higher level, while the PhD in Nursing is a research-focused degree intended to prepare nurses to carry out academic research within their profession. This is reflected in significant differences between the curricula for the two degrees, such as the PhD not requiring any clinical hours and the DNP having a scholarly project rather than the PhD's original research dissertation. The PhD also takes longer to complete on average, taking 5.0–5.1 years for students entering post-master's compared to 2.43 years for the DNP and 5.2–5.9 years for students entering post-bachelor's compared to 3.8 years for the DNP. The faculty profile differs between DNP and PhD programs, with DNP program faculty teaching being more likely to be active in clinical practice and to hold a DNP, while PhD program are more likely to be active in research and to hold a PhD.

When the DNP was proposed, critics described its development as "a major mistake for [the] profession of nursing as well as the discipline of nursing knowledge", due to it separating the missions of practice and research.

The required clinical practice hours to be accepted on a DNP course range from zero to 1000 hours, compared to a minimum of one year of clinical experience for admission to a PhD. There is a requirement that DNP students are expected to complete at least 1000 post-baccalaureate clinical hours. These can include clinical hours undertaken as part of a prior degree, and DNP programs do not specifically require additional clinical hours beyond those at the master's level, but many programs do include clinical components.

== Title confusion in the clinical setting ==
Some critics have argued that there is scope for patients or service users to be confused about whether they are consulting a physician or a nurse if nurses use the title "doctor" in a clinical setting. Lawsuits have also resulted from this confusion, where holders of the DNP have referred to themselves with the title "doctor" in clinical settings. In some US states, there is a legal basis limiting nurses using the title of "doctor" in clinical practice. However, in other US states, nurses are bringing their own legal arguments to facilitate their legal use of the title.

== See also ==
- Advanced practice nurses
  - Nurse practitioner
  - Nurse midwife
  - Clinical nurse specialist
  - Nurse anesthetist
- Diploma in Nursing
- Associate of Science in Nursing
- Bachelor of Science in Nursing
- Master of Science in Nursing
- Nurse education
- Nursing school
