= Licensed practical nurse =

Category of healthcare professional

Occupation
- Occupation type: Professional
- Activity sectors: Nursing

Description
- Education required: Depends on the country, but generally a diploma or associate’s degree in practical nursing that is 1.5–2 years in duration
- Fields of employment: Healthcare
- Related jobs: Registered nurse

A licensed practical nurse (LPN), in much of the United States and Canada, is a nurse who provides direct nursing care for people who are sick, injured, convalescent, or disabled. In the United States, LPNs work under the direction of physicians, mid-level practitioners, and may work under the direction of registered nurses depending on their jurisdiction.

In Canada, LPNs' scope of practice is autonomously similar to the registered nurse in providing direct nursing care. They are also responsible for their individual actions and practice.

Another title provided in the Canadian province of Ontario is registered practical nurse (RPN). In California and Texas, such a nurse is referred to as a licensed vocational nurse (LVN).

In the United States, LPN training programs are one to two years in duration. All U.S. state and territorial boards also require passage of the NCLEX-PN exam. In Canada (except for Québec), the education program is two years of full-time post-secondary and students must pass the Canadian Practical Nurse Registration Exam (CPNRE), administered by the for-profit Yardstick Assessment Strategies. In 2022, Ontario and British Columbia plan to discontinue CPNRE in favour of the REx-PN, administered by the National Council of State Boards of Nursing (NCSBN).

== United States ==
According to the 2010–2011 Occupational Outlook Handbook published by the Department of Labor's Bureau of Labor Statistics, licensed practical nurses care for patients in many ways:

Often, they provide basic bedside care. Many LPNs measure and record patients' vital signs such as weight, height, temperature, blood pressure, pulse, and respiratory rate. A licensed practical nurse (LPN) in much of the United States and most Canadian provinces is a nurse who cares for people who are sick, injured, convalescent, or disabled. LPNs work under the direction of registered nurses or physicians. They also prepare and give injections and enemas, monitor and also perform placement of catheters, dress wounds, and give alcohol rubs and massages. To help keep patients comfortable, they assist with bathing, dressing, and personal hygiene, moving in bed, standing, and walking. They might also feed patients who need help eating. Experienced LPNs may supervise nursing assistants and aides, and other LPNs.

As part of their work, LPNs collect samples for testing, perform routine laboratory tests, and record food and fluid intake and output. They clean and monitor medical equipment. Sometimes, they help physicians and registered nurses perform tests and procedures. Some LPNs help to deliver, care for, and feed infants.

LPNs also monitor their patients and report adverse reactions to medications or treatments. LPNs gather information from patients, including their health history and how they are currently feeling. They may use this information to complete insurance forms, pre-authorizations, and referrals, and they share information with registered nurses and doctors to help determine the best course of care for a patient. LPNs often teach family members how to care for a relative or teach patients about good health habits.

According to the Occupational Outlook Handbook, while most LPNs are generalists and will work in any area of health care, some LPNs work in specialized settings, such as nursing homes, doctor's offices, or in home care. In some American states, LPNs are permitted to administer prescribed medicines, start intravenous fluids, and provide care to ventilator-dependent patients. While about 18 percent of LPNs/LVNs in the United States worked part-time in 2008, most work a 40-hour week. The Occupational Outlook Handbook states that LPNs may have to work nights, weekends, and holidays; often stand for long periods and help patients move in bed, stand, or walk; and may face occupational hazards which include exposure to caustic chemicals, radiation, and infectious diseases; back injuries from moving patients; workplace stress; and sometimes confused, agitated, or uncooperative patients."

In California, licensed vocational nurses (LVNs) empty bedpans, commodes and clean and change incontinent adults. Licensed vocational nurses read vital signs such as pulse, temperature, blood pressure and respiration. They administer injections and enemas, monitor catheters and give massages or alcohol rubs. They may apply dressings, hot water bottles and ice packs. They help patients bathe and dress, treat bedsores and change soiled bed sheets. LVNs feed patients and record their food consumption, while monitoring the fluids they take in and excrete.

In May 2023, the median annual wages of LPNs/LVNs in the United States was $59,730, with the lowest 10 percent earning less than $45,670, and the highest 10 percent earning more than $77,870. Median annual wages differed by setting:

Setting	Median annual wages
Employment services	$63,340
Nursing care facilities	$61,690
Home health care services	$58,620
General medical and surgical hospitals	$54,490
Offices of physicians	$51,820

According to the Occupational Outlook Handbook, in 2008 there were some 753,600 jobs held by LPNs/LVNs in the United States, with about 25 percent working in hospitals, 28 percent in nursing care facilities, and 12 percent in physicians' offices. Other LPNs/LVN worked for home health care services; employment services; residential care facilities; community care facilities; outpatient care centers; and federal, state, and local government agencies. In the United States, employment of LPNs is projected to grow by 21 percent between 2008 and 2018, much faster than average. The growth is expected to be driven by the "long-term care needs of an increasing elderly population and the general increase in demand for healthcare services". By contrast hospitals are phasing out licensed practical nurses. While LPN jobs were expected to decline, in 2010 the Bureau of Labor Statistics reported the job growth rate of Licensed Practical Nurses as 22%, far above the national average of 14%. Median annual salary was reported as $44,090 per year, and hourly salary was reported as $19.42.

In the United States, training programs to become a LPN/LVN last about one year and are offered by vocational/technical schools and by community colleges. The Occupational Outlook Handbook states that in order to be eligible for licensure, LPNs must complete a state-approved training program. A high school diploma or equivalent usually is required for acceptance into a training program, but some programs accept candidates without a diploma and some programs are part of a high school curriculum. According to the Occupational Outlook Handbook states that most programs include both classroom study (covering basic nursing concepts and subjects related to patient care, including anatomy, physiology, medical-surgical nursing, pediatrics, obstetrics nursing, pharmacology, nutrition, and first aid) and supervised clinical practice (usually in a hospital setting, but sometimes elsewhere).

The National Council Licensure Examination-Practical Nurse (NCLEX-PN), a computer-based national licensing exam developed and administered by the National Council of State Boards of Nursing, is the exam required to obtain licensure as a LPN/LVN. In many states, LPNs/LVNs are required to obtain continuing education credits throughout their career.

=== Advancement ===
In some settings, LPNs/LVNs have opportunities for advancement, including the possibility of becoming credentialed in a certain area (such as IV therapy, gerontology, long-term care and pharmacology) or of becoming a charge nurse, responsible for overseeing the work of other LPNs and various unlicensed assistive personnel, such as nursing assistants. Some LPNs/LVNs choose to undergo further education and become registered nurses. LPN-to-RN training programs ("bridge programs") exist for this purpose. These include further classroom study to obtain at least an Associate of Science in Nursing (ASN) and clinical practice followed by another exam, the National Council Licensure Examination-Registered Nurse (NCLEX-RN).

The origins of the practical/vocational nurse can be traced back to the practice of self-taught individuals who worked in home care in the past, assisting with basic care (ADLs such as bathing) and light housekeeping duties (such as cooking). Licensing standards for practical nurses came later than those for professional nurses; by 1945, 19 states and one territory had licensure laws, but only one state law covered practical nursing. By 1955, however, every state had licensing laws for practical nurses. Practical nurses who had been functioning as such at the time new standards were adopted were usually granted a license by waiver, and exempted from new training requirements.

The first formal training program for practical nurses was developed at the Young Women's Christian Association (YWCA) in New York City in 1892. The following year this became the Ballard School of Practical Nursing (after Lucinda Ballard, an early benefactor) and was a three-month-long course of study concerned with the care of infants, children and the elderly and disabled. The curriculum included instruction in cooking and nutrition as well as basic science and nursing. The school closed in 1949 after the YWCA was reorganized. Other early practical nursing education program include the Thompson Practical Nursing School, established in 1907 in Brattleboro, Vermont (still in operation today), and the Household Nursing School (later the Shepard-Gill School of Practical Nursing), established in 1918 in Boston. In 1930, there were still just 11 schools of practical nursing, but between 1948 and 1954, 260 more opened. The Association of Practical Nurse Schools (APNS) as founded in 1942, and the next year the name of the organization was changed to National Association for Practical Nurse Education and Service (NAPNAS), and the first planned curriculum for practical nurses as developed.

== Canada ==
In Canada, nursing, as with all other health care professions and trades, is regulated by the respective province or territory, through an enabling statute legal scheme where an act of the relevant legislature grants delegated authority to a non-sovereign entity such as a college of nurses with powers to regulate the profession within specific parameters and also grants to the respective minister of the Crown oversight and the powers to write regulations through a Ministerial Order in Council.

As an example, the Canadian province of British Columbia's enabling act is the Health Professions Act, RSBC 1996, c. 183, and the resulting nursing-specific regulation is incorporated into one Regulation together with a number of other practitioners such as audiologists and naturopaths in the Health Professions Designation Regulation, BC Reg 270/2008.

While the act and the regulation outline basic organizational architecture, each professional organization creates its own bylaws and codes of conduct and practice subject to ministerial and judicial review and must be in compliance with accepted norms of administrative law such as transparency and accountability in governance, fundamental principles of natural justice, an internal appeal process and compliance with the Canadian Charter of Rights and Freedoms.

Such legal schemes enable self-governance and save costs to governments by delegating regulatory responsibilities to a self-funded and self-administered professional entity, but are also known to engage in protectionist practices since the delegation also grants a monopoly for the provision of services to only one body, as widely studied by the late economist Uwe Reinhardt.

A nurse who is entitled to practice in one jurisdiction cannot work in another without applying to and being granted a license by the local regulatory body. Educational, legal and practice requirements are similar, so mobility is possible; however, the nurse still has to fulfill requirements, such as writing exams and paying fees, in each location they wish to practice. This is akin to all other regulated professions where the provincial government holds exclusive jurisdiction.

=== Practical nurse compensation ===
The average hourly practical nursing salary at the entry level is CA$24.00 an hour. The highest practical nursing salary at the experienced level is CA$48.00. However, some practical nurses may make upwards of CA$40.00 an hour. Many nurses also receive overtime compensation for the long hours and understaffing of many institutions.

=== Alberta ===
Licensed Practical Nurses (LPNs) in Alberta are regulated by the College of Licensed Practical Nurses of Alberta (CLPNA), which oversees licensing, standards of practice, and continuing competency requirements. LPNs complete a two‑year diploma program at an approved college and must pass the Canadian Practical Nurse Registration Exam (CPNRE) before entering practice.

==== Scope of practice ====
Alberta LPNs provide care across diverse settings including acute care, seniors’ health, long‑term care, community health, primary care clinics, education, occupational health and safety, and public health. Their scope of practice includes assessing patients, planning and implementing care, administering medications, performing procedures, and delivering health education. Many LPNs also hold specialized skills in areas such as the operating room, oncology, and leadership roles.

==== History ====
The profession in Alberta has evolved significantly since its introduction in the mid‑20th century. The Alberta Certified Nursing Aides Association (ACNAA) was established in 1955, later becoming the Alberta Association of Registered Nursing Assistants (AARNA) in 1978. By 1985, the Professional Council of Registered Nursing Assistants (PCRNA) was formed, marking steps toward self‑regulation. In 2003, the CLPNA gained full regulatory authority, reshaping the profession into its current form.

==== Current Status ====
Today, Alberta’s LPNs are recognized as autonomous practitioners responsible for their own actions and practice, with a scope that is increasingly aligned with registered nursing in providing direct patient care.

=== Ontario ===
Ontario uses the designation Registered Practical Nurse to refer to a role known as Licensed Practical Nurse in the rest of Canada and elsewhere. This should not be confused with Registered Psychiatric Nurse, a title used in certain other Canadian jurisdictions.

All nurses in the province of Ontario are regulated by the College of Nurses of Ontario (CNO), to which they must apply for and maintain membership. "College" in this case is used similarly to the word "board"; they are not a school or training provider themselves. To apply for membership, an applicant must satisfy requirements including completion of an approved two year post secondary training program, evidence of recent practice as a nurse, pass both an entrance and jurisprudence examination, be proficient in either English or French, have legal authorization to be employed in Canada, disclosure of certain past or ongoing legal proceedings, disclosure of certain proceedings involving practice of nursing in other jurisdictions and disclosure of certain kinds of health conditions and disabilities.

In 2008, there were 27,432 RPNs registered as practicing with the CNO. By 2017, this has increased to 48,748.

By comparison to other classes of nursing in Ontario, there were 104,483 RNs and 3,083 NPs. 90.9% of the 2017 RPNs were female and the average age was 40.8 years. 89.9% attended a nursing school in Ontario; however, members who previously attended nursing schools outside Ontario which were not accepted as valid by the CNO at the time of their registration are not reflected in that number.

The CNO's definition for a nurse's scope of practice is: "The practice of nursing is the promotion of health and the assessment of, the provision of care for, and the treatment of health conditions by supportive, preventive, therapeutic, palliative, and rehabilitative means in order to attain or maintain optimal function".

The College of Nurses of Ontario (CNO) outlines 13 controlled acts, 4 of which can be performed by RPNs and RNs. The 4 Controlled Acts available to be performed by RNs and RPNs are:

- Performing a prescribed procedure below the dermis or mucous membrane
- Administering a substance by injection or inhalation
- Putting an instrument, hand, or finger:
  - Beyond the external ear canal
  - Beyond the point in the nasal passages where they normally narrow
  - Beyond the larynx
  - Beyond the opening of the urethra
  - Beyond the labia majora
  - Beyond the anal verge or
  - Into an artificial opening in the body
- Dispensing a drug

The College of Nurses of Ontario (CNO) has 4 principal roles in the regulation of Ontario nurses:

- Articulating and Promoting Practice Standards
- Establishing Requirements for Entry to Practice
- Administering a Quality Assurance Program
- Enforcing Standards of Practice and Conduct

The CNO has set 7 standards of practice for all nurses in Ontario:

- Accountability
- Continuing Competence
- Ethics
- Relationships (Therapeutic Nurse-Client Relationships and Professional Relationships)
- Knowledge
- Knowledge Application
- Leadership

Registered Nurses are expected to have a higher level of competency in the last three of these standards of practice than RPNs. In Alberta, LPN's have a greater scope of practice than most provinces. They can perform most tasks that an RN can do; however, the complexity of the patient's condition determines whether the LPN is in charge of care, or collaborating on care with an RN. In Ontario, RPNs are actively expanding their roles and scope of practice, modelling similarly to Alberta, with the exception that in Ontario, both RNs and RPNs are regulated by the same regulatory body. This model allows for both categories of nurses to be practising under the same guidelines and accountability models. In Canada, in home-care settings LPNs sometimes act as the liaison between the care provider and the local health authority, coordinating care.

== United Kingdom ==
The state enrolled nursing qualification can no longer be gained in Britain. Prior to the implementation of Project 2000 which radically altered the face of nurse education in the mid-1990s, SEN students used to be trained within two years. Their course was a simplified version of the longer training offered to state registered nurses (SRNs, later to be renamed RGNs, registered general nurses and now known as level-one nurses). Some auxiliary nurses with many years of experience were selected to progress to enrollment as a SEN. People training to be SRNs who failed their exams at the third attempt were also able to enter the nursing register as a SEN. No new SENs are trained in the UK today. The Nursing and Midwifery Council (the regulatory body for nurses in the UK) used to allow people to be added to the register as level two nurses if they are moving from a similar position from within the European Union; however, this has now stopped. Level-two nurses from the EU wishing to gain entry to the Register in the UK must be willing to train as a first level (staff) nurse. This is by two different means: starting their training from scratch as a pre-registration student nurse, or by joining an existing cohort of student nurses starting their second year of training, and completing years 2 and 3 with them.

Formerly, there was a large segregation between the "green" SENs and "blue" SRNs, which were the colours of uniform typically worn. SENs were very much complementary to the nursing team; however, they did not have the status of SRNs and were ineligible to be promoted, e.g., to ward sister. Many SENs sat or re-sat the SRN exams; however, a large number did not and were quite content being SENs. Nowadays, the divide between level one and two nurses is diminishing owing to the small number of SENs still in practice. The demise of the SEN is lamented by many who saw it as a balanced way to staff a ward. However, the divide also meant that potentially the gap in clinical excellence could be too wide. In many areas, ENs and SENs are being replaced with lesser qualified healthcare assistants educated to S/NVQ Level 3 or 4, being awarded titles such as Senior Healthcare Assistant, Senior Auxiliary Nurse, Senior Clinical Support Worker, Care Team Leader or Senior Care Assistant.

Although originally viewed as a less qualified nurse, ENs and SENs are now able to hold the rank of Deputy Charge Nurse in the NHS and Deputy Home Manager in the private sector, as well as unit manager, both within the NHS and the private sector, and in some instances higher, technically out-ranking a staff nurse (first-level RN).

Auxiliary nurses draw blood samples, change bandages, and record ECGs. At present, they work under the direct supervision of a registered nurse.

== Australia ==
The national Australian Health Practitioner Regulation Agency (AHPRA) issues permission to practise. Enrolled nurses (EN), or Division 2 nurses, in Australia must now complete the Diploma of Nursing and usually spend 18 months training, consisting of 36 weeks theoretical component at TAFE colleges, some universities or private institutions, followed by practical experience in hospital wards for the remainder of the time. The majority of ENs eventually move on to attend university and become registered nurses, although a substantial number remain as ENs in public and private hospitals, and nursing homes. Trainee enrolled nurses (TENs) become employees of the hospital for the twelve-month training period, meaning that, as well as gaining practical experience on the wards, they are paid for hours worked. This attracts a substantial number of applicants, who may wish to pursue nursing as a career, but are unable to afford to become full-time university students. As of 2009, however, the government has stopped working with the NSW Department of Health, and those wishing to become enrolled nurses are not being paid. The enrolled nurse programme also allows people to ascertain whether or not they are suited to nursing before they make the decision to study it at university level.

The role of enrolled nurses in Australia has greatly increased in recent years in response to the continuing shortage of registered nurses in the Australian public health care system. In 2004, a medication endorsement certificate was introduced, allowing ENs to administer some oral medication (excluding schedule 8 drugs of addiction) upon completion, although medication endorsement is now included in the diploma. Endorsement also permits the administration of some intravenous (IV) medications and fluids (intravenous therapy or IVT), as well as intramuscular (IM) and subcutaneous (SC) injections. Enrolled nurses (ENs) are also permitted to check and give Schedule 4 and Schedule 8 medications with a registered nurse. Most enrolled nurses working in public hospitals are permitted to conduct ECGs, collect pathology specimens, and routinely take a patient load under the direct supervision of a registered nurse.

Despite the fact that the role of the EN in Australia has been greatly expanded in recent years, opportunities for career progression remain somewhat limited, and for this reason, many choose to go on and study to become registered nurses. In terms of financial remuneration, the earning capacity of an enrolled nurse is capped at five years of service, whereas registered nurses continue to eight years before salary capping is applied.

== See also ==
- Enrolled Nurse Professional Association
- Nurse
- Nursing
- Registered nurse (RN)
