= Scope of practice =

What a healthcare practitioner is permitted to undertake

Scope of practice describes the activities and duties that a healthcare professional is permitted to undertake. The limits on the actions of these practitioners are set by the terms of their professional license and what the law allows. Each jurisdiction can have laws, licensing bodies, and regulations that describe requirements for education and training, and define scope of practice.

Governing, licensing, and law enforcement bodies are often at the sub-national (e.g. state or province) level, but national guidelines and regulations also often exist. For example, in the United States, the National Highway Traffic Safety Administration in the Department of Transportation has a national scope of practice for emergency medical services.

== By country ==
=== United States ===
In the United States, scope of practice law is determined by the states' legislatures and regulatory boards.

According to the National Conference of State Legislatures, non-physician health care providers are providing increasing levels of service to patients, especially in rural and other underserved communities.

== By profession ==
=== Nursing & advanced practice nurses (APNs) ===
The American Medical Association (AMA), an advocacy group for physicians, claims that increasing the scope of APNs does not increase access to care and can be dangerous because the responsibilities afforded to the professionals exceed the tasks that they can safely perform given their training, which is lower relative to physicians. However, according to the American Nurses Association, it is important that nurses, including APNs, can practice to the fullest extent of their abilities and training; they claim that there is a growing body of evidence to support APNs caring for patients with broader scopes.

=== Emergency medical services ===
In the United States, the National Scope of Practice Model is designed to standardize and improve EMS provider education. It provides four levels of provider: Emergency Medical Responder (EMR), Emergency Medical Technician (EMT), Advanced EMT (AEMT), and Paramedic.

== See also ==
- Health care professional requisites
- Standing orders - scopes of practice are often defined in physicians' standing orders
