= Registered nurse =

Nurse who has graduated from a nursing program

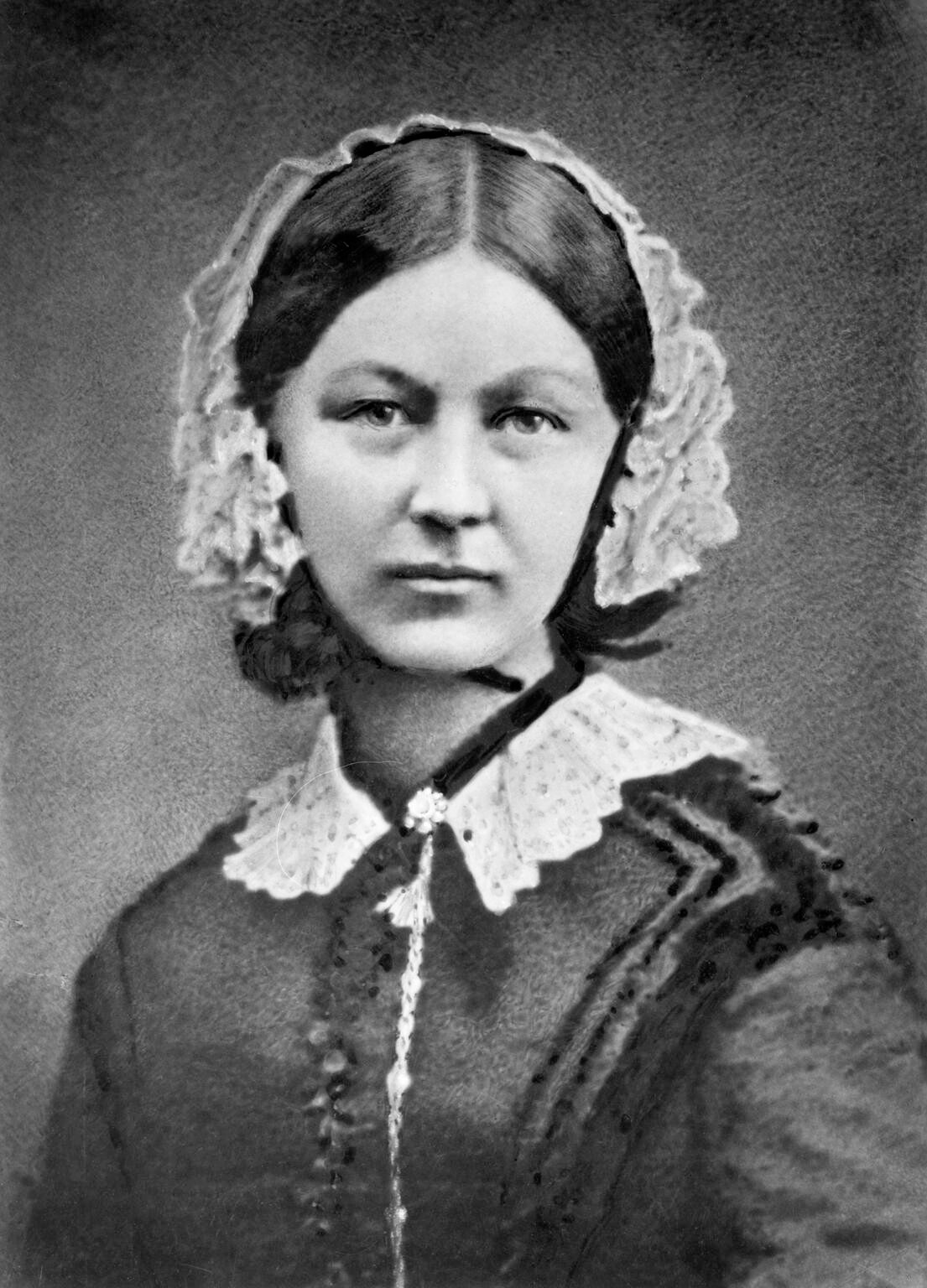
Florence Nightingale, the founder of modern nursing

A registered nurse (RN) is a healthcare professional who has graduated or successfully passed a nursing program from a recognized nursing school and met the requirements outlined by a country, state, province or similar government-authorized licensing body to obtain a nursing license or registration. An RN's scope of practice is determined by legislation and job role, and is regulated by a professional body or council.

Registered nurses are employed in a wide variety of professional settings, and often specialize in a field of practice. Depending on the jurisdiction, they may be responsible for supervising care delivered by other healthcare workers, including student nurses, licensed practical nurses, unlicensed assistive personnel, and less-experienced RNs.

Registered nurses must usually meet a minimum practice hours requirement and undertake continuing education to maintain their license. Furthermore, certain jurisdictions require that an RN remain free from serious criminal convictions.

== History ==
Florence Nightingale was a British nurse who provided the foundation of modern nursing. Nightingale obtained her experience during the Crimean War. In 1860, Nightingale established the St. Thomas Hospital and the Nightingale Training School for Nurses.

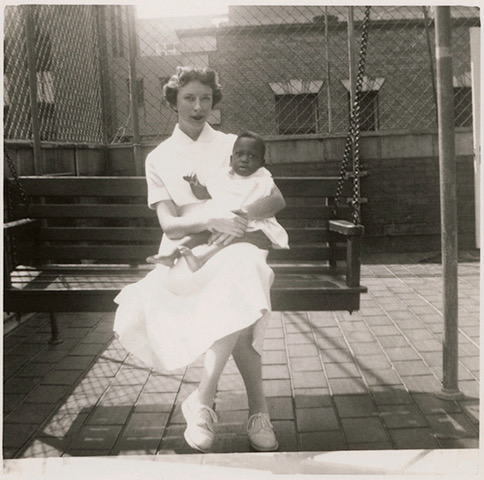
Registered Nurse at Jefferson Medical College Hospital 1952

The registration of nurses by nursing councils or boards began in the early twentieth century. New Zealand registered the first nurse in 1901 with the establishment of the Nurses Registration Act. Nurses were required to complete three years of training and pass a state-administered examination. Registration ensured a degree of consistency in the education of new nurses, and the title was usually protected by law. After 1905 in California, for example, it became a misdemeanour to claim to be an RN without a certificate of registration. Today, typical requirements for an RN licence in the United States include earning either an associate degree (community college) or a baccalaureate degree (college or university) in nursing and passing an examination.

Registration acts allowed authorities a degree of control over who was admitted to the profession. Requirements varied by location, but often included a stipulation that the applicant must be "of good moral character" and must not have mental or physical conditions that rendered them unable to practice.

Before the 1870s, most people were cared for at home by family members. The view on nursing began to change as more medical advances were made during the end of the 19th century and leading into the beginning of the 20th century.

== Benefits of nursing ==
When obtaining a nursing degree, personal benefits come with it. One personal benefit is that nursing is a highly respected position. Another personal advantage is the availability of jobs; nurses are in high demand. Nursing also provides many different possibilities of employment. Many positions fall under the category of nursing. Being able to explore multiple options gives someone the chance to find the most suitable job for themselves. Nurses are generally in demand around the world. The World Health Organization estimates that by 2030 there will be a worldwide shortage of 4.5 million nurses.

Patients benefit from having a sufficient number of nurses to meet the clinic's or hospital's needs. As the number of nurses increases, the quality of life for the patients increases as well.

== Issues within registered nursing ==
Nurses are responsible for providing a high quality of care and maintaining the well-being of patients. With that being said, various situations cause nurses to feel overwhelmed, such as an excessive workload. An excessive workload can make errors and mishaps more likely. Insufficient time to complete tasks and inadequate staffing also contribute to missed aspects of nursing care. An indicator of an excessive workload correlates with missed nursing care and activities. Missed care and activities may cause nurses to feel stressed and anxious. Nurses often experience sleep disturbance, which can result in lost sleep or inability to fall asleep.

== By nation ==
=== Australia ===
Nursing registration in Australia has been at a national level since 2010, since the inception of the Nursing and Midwifery Board of Australia (NMBA), which forms part of the Australian Health Practitioner Regulation Agency (AHPRA). Prior to 2010, Nursing registration in Australia was administered individually by each state and territory.

The title 'Registered Nurse' (also known in the state of Victoria as a 'Division 1 Nurse') is granted to a nurse who has successfully completed a board-approved course in the field of nursing, as outlined by education and registration standards defined by the NMBA. Registered Nurses are also required to meet certain other standards to fulfil registration standards as outlined by the NMBA, and these can include continuing professional development, recency of practice, criminal history checks and competency in the English language. A nurse who is registered with the NMBA, and as such AHPRA, is free to practice in any state or territory in Australia, providing they meet the governing boards requirements and the individual state/territory legislative requirements, such as working with children checks and individual police checks for that state or territory.

Educational requirements for an entry-level Registered Nurse are at the level of bachelor's degree in Australia, and can range in two to four years in length with three years being the national average. Some universities offer a two-year 'fast track' bachelor's degree, whereby a students study three years worth of coursework compressed in a two-year period. This is made possible by reducing summer and winter semester breaks and utilising three semesters per year compared to two. Some universities also offer combined degrees which allow the graduate to exit the program with a Masters in Nursing, e.g.: Bachelor of Science/Master of Nursing, and these are generally offered over a four-year period.

Postgraduate nursing education is widespread in Australia and is encouraged by employing bodies such as state health services (e.g. New South Wales Health). There are many varying courses and scholarships available which provide a bachelor-level Registered Nurse the opportunity to 'up-skill' and assume an extended scope of practice. Such courses are offered at all levels of the post graduate spectrum and range from graduate certificate to master's degree and provide a theoretical framework for a bachelor level Registered nurse to take up an advanced practice position such as Clinical Nurse Specialist (CNS), Clinical Nurse Consultant (CNC) and Nurse Practitioner (NP).

Rural and Remote nursing is an important sub-speciality within Australia and Registered Nurses with advanced practice skills and of which have undertaken further training, such as Pharmacotherapeutics for Remote Area Nurses (RAN's), Immunisation Certificate, Remote Emergency Care / Remote Pre Hospital Trauma Certification and Midwifery Emergency Care Courses, permit a generalist Registered Nurse to undertake an advanced scope of practice to operate autonomously within certain clinical situations under the guidance of a 'standard treatment manual' such as the Central Australian Remote Practitioners Association (CARPA) manuals as opposed to the direct order of a medical practitioner whilst practising in a remote/isolated setting. A Registered Nurse at this level would be professionally referred to as a 'Remote Area Nurse' or 'Clinical Nurse Specialist - Speciality'.

=== Canada ===
In all Canadian provinces except Quebec, newly registered nurses are required to have a Bachelor of Science in Nursing. This is either achieved through a four-year university (or collaborative) program or through a bridging program for registered practical nurses or licensed practical nurses. Some universities also offer compressed programs for applicants already holding a bachelor's degree in another field.

Prior to 2015, initial licensure as an RN required passing the Canadian Registered Nurse Examination (CRNE) offered by the Canadian Nurses Association. As of 2015, for initial licensure, Canadian RNs must pass the NCLEX-RN exam offered by the National Council of State Boards of Nursing. In Quebec, the 'Ordre des infirmières et infirmiers du Québec' (Quebec Order of Nurses) administers their own licensing exam for registration within the province.

=== Denmark ===
In Denmark, nurses are certified by the Danish Ministry of Health. It is also the ministry that keeps track of violations and can retract individual authorization.

=== Hong Kong ===
Nursing is a licensed professional occupation in Hong Kong. The profession is regulated by the Nursing Council of Hong Kong, a statutory body. Nurses in Hong Kong are divided into registered nurses and enrolled nurses, with the former requiring more extensive professional training.

There are a total of 59,082 nurses in Hong Kong as of 2019, with the majority of registered nurses working for the Hospital Authority. Nursing education is provided by universities, post-secondary colleges, and hospital-based nursing schools.

Applicants must complete a pre-registration nursing program lasting not less than 3 years to enroll as registered nurses. Applicants trained outside Hong Kong must have a practicing certificate recognized by the Nursing Council of Hong Kong and pass the Licensing Examination for Registration.

=== India ===
In the Republic of India nursing is regulated by the Indian Nursing Council.

=== Malaysia ===
In Malaysia, nursing is regulated by the Ministry of Health Malaysia Nursing Division.

=== United Kingdom ===
Nursing in the United Kingdom is the profession of registered nurses and nursing associates in the primary and secondary care of patients. It has evolved from assisting doctors to encompass a variety of professional roles. More than 780,000 registered nurses practise in the UK, working in settings such as hospitals, health centres, nursing homes, hospices, communities, military, prisons, and academia. Many are employed by the National Health Service (NHS).

Nursing is split into four fields: adults, children, mental health, and learning disability. Within these nurses may work within specialties such as medical care or theatres, and may specialise further in areas such as cardiac care. Nurses often work in multi-disciplinary teams, but equally work independently, and may work in supporting sectors such as education or research.

The UK-wide regulator for nursing is the Nursing and Midwifery Council (NMC), and all nurses and nursing associates must be registered to practise. Dental Nurses, nursery nurses and veterinary nurses are not regulated by the NMC and follow different training, qualifications and career pathways.

=== United States ===
In the US, a registered nurse is a professional clinician who has completed at least an associate degree in nursing or a hospital-based diploma program, followed by successfully completing the NCLEX-RN examination for initial licensure. Other requirements vary by state. More information about the NCLEX-RN examination and specific state nursing boards is provided by the National Council of State Boards of Nursing. A BSN degree is preferred by many employers. To obtain state licensure, applicants must also meet clinical nursing requirements and pass the NCLEX-RN. Six weeks prior to graduation, students may submit an application for licensure and then sign up for the NCLEX-RN.

Although associate degree programs are often two years, Associate of Science in Nursing (ASN) degrees frequently take three years to complete because of the increased volume of undergraduate coursework related to the profession of nursing, sometimes as part of the program itself and sometimes as prerequisites for admission. Bachelor of Science in Nursing (BSN) degrees include more thorough coursework in leadership and community health, as well as more clinical hours, and can be completed as an extension of an Associate program or standalone. Accelerated versions of both exist, and are considered particularly challenging due to the increased course-load necessary to complete the program in a short time. Some employers, especially hospitals, may require a bachelor's degree even for entry-level positions; however, it is also increasingly common for hospitals to hire ASN-licensed individuals for limited practice, under the condition that the individual complete a BSN within a designated time-frame, typically 2–3 years.

Specialty certification is available through organizations such as the American Nurses Credentialing Center, a subsidiary of the American Nurses Association. After meeting the eligibility requirements and passing the appropriate specialty certification exam, the designation of Registered Nurse – Board Certified (RN-BC) credential is granted.

Registered Nurses can work in a variety of settings including hospitals, physicians' offices, nursing homes, and home health care services. The median pay for a registered nurse in 2016, according to the Bureau of Labor Statistics, was $68,450.00 per year with a bachelor's degree. RNs can progress to become clinical nurse specialists, nurse practitioners, certified nurse midwives, or nurse anesthetists after obtaining a graduate nursing degree.

In some states, the law allows nurses with higher-level degrees, such as Masters of Science in Nursing (MSN) or Doctor of Nursing Practice (DNP) to work with increased autonomy, permitting them to practice limited medicine including sometimes even the prescription of medication without the official supervision of a licensed physician (MD or DO). However, a number of advanced nursing degree programs are sufficiently specialized for work within a hospital setting (for example, Nurse Anesthetist) that it is uncommon for such nurses to run their own medical practice.

Nurses in the United States follow the Nurse Practice Act (NPA) which are laws that protect the public's health and welfare by outlining the safe practices of nursing. All states and territories in the U.S. have a nurse practice act. The rules and regulations may vary from state to state. It is important to know the current laws governing nursing practices in their state.

Typical requirements to get into a nursing school: High School diploma, required GPA for school of choice, admissions application, personal essay, personal interview, teacher recommendations, volunteer experience (preferably in healthcare), application fee, test of English as a Foreign Language (TOEFL) if applicable, minimum SAT scores or TEAS. Students who wish to pursue either an ADN or a BSN in nursing must first fulfill the necessary liberal arts, math, and scientific prerequisites. Basic anatomy, physiology, biology, psychology, and anatomy are frequently required courses for nursing programs. A minimum "C" grade in these courses is frequently needed for admission to nursing schools.

== Economics ==
As of 2011, there are 2.24 million registered nurses in China. As of 2014, the United States had approximately 2.75 million registered nurses and Canada had just over 250,000. In the US and Canada this works out to approximately eight nurses per 1,000 people. According to the Bureau of Labor Statistics, registered nursing jobs are projected to grow by 15% between 2016 and 2026, which is much faster than the average overall rate. The growth rate in the United States has a number of reasons, including an increased interest in preventive care, an increase in chronic illnesses, and the demands of services required by the baby boom generation. The highest-paid registered nurses in the United States are in California. California cities often comprise the top five highest-paying metropolitan areas for registered nurses in the country. Most registered nurses start working with competitive salaries. The median annual salary for registered nurses was $80,000 per year as of June 2020, according to the Bureau of Labor Statistics (BLS.) The lowest 10 percent of RN's earned less than $70,000, and the highest 10 percent earned more than $101,360 for 2015.

== See also ==
- Advanced practice nurse
- Nurse registry
- Nursing credentials and certifications
- Nursing education
- Nursing shortage
- Registered Dental Nurse
- Registered psychiatric nurse
