= Enrolled Nurse Professional Association =

Previous Logo of ENPA NSW

The Enrolled Nurse Professional Association (ENPA) was formed in August 1994 at Ashfield NSW by the enthusiasm of 4 enrolled nurses.

The Association was founded after the Inaugural State Conference for Enrolled Nurses (Ultimo 1993) identified a need for an association to be formed to pursue the professional, career and educational interests of this group of nurses.

From this first basis, a strong association evolved to meet the needs of members and colleagues in NSW and across Australia.

The association as it stands today is separate from a union of nurses in that it maintains a unique group membership for dissemination and networking of relevant topics and seeks to attain further professional acknowledgement of skills, aptitude and education through consultative mechanisms.

In addition the organisation does maintain close communication with the NSW Nurses Association, and the New South Wales Department of Health, has representation on invited NSW Nurses and Midwives Board committees and consults with other parties on a needs and enquiry basis, including national organisations such as the National Enrolled Nurse Association (a special interest group of the Australian Nursing Federation) and international organisations including the New Zealand Nurses Organisation.

The Enrolled Nurse Professional Association is the only independent body for this level of nurse in Australia catering for the needs of the professional enrolled nurse primarily in New South Wales.

Elections of the executive are held every 2 years.

The postal address of the group is P.O.Box 775, KINGSWOOD, NSW 2750

Contact Information

WEBSITE - www.enpansw.net

MAIL - P.O.Box 775, KINGSWOOD, NSW 2750

== See also ==
- Licensed Practical Nurse
