= National Council of State Boards of Nursing =

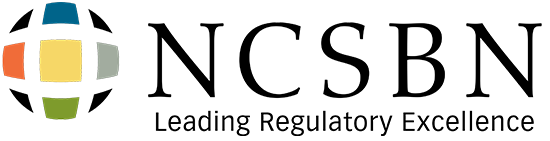
- Formation: March 15, 1978; 48 years ago
- Type: Nonprofit
- Tax ID no.: 36-3481016
- Headquarters: Chicago, Illinois, U.S.
- Location: United States
- Website: www.ncsbn.org

The National Council of State Boards of Nursing (NCSBN) is an independent, non-profit organization representing nursing regulatory bodies in the United States. It serves as a collaborative body for state boards of nursing, facilitating communication and action on public health and safety matters. One of the core functions of the NCSBN is the development and administration of the National Council Licensure Examination (NCLEX), a standardized exam required for nurse licensure in most jurisdictions. Additionally, the organization conducts research to inform evidence-based regulatory practices regarding public protection. The NCSBN's membership includes 59 nursing regulatory bodies across all 50 U.S. states, the District of Columbia, and four U.S. territories.

== See also ==
- National Council Licensure Examination
- Nursing
- Nursing in the United States
- Nurse licensure
