= Nurse licensure =

Granting of a license to practice the profession of nursing

Nurse licensure is the process by which various regulatory bodies, usually a Board of Nursing, regulate the practice of nursing within its jurisdiction. The primary purpose of nurse licensure is to grant permission to practice as a nurse after verifying the applicant has met minimal competencies to safely perform nursing activities within nursing's scope of practice. Licensure is necessary when the regulated activities are complex, require specialized knowledge and skill and independent decision making.

Nurse licensure also provides:

- Nursing activities may only be legally performed by individuals holding a nursing license issued by the regulatory body
- Title protection: only the persons issued a license are legally permitted to use certain titles, such as registered nurse, advanced practice registered nurse, etc.
- In order to assure that the public is protected, authority is granted to the regulatory body to take disciplinary action in the event the licensee violate the law or any rules promulgated by the regulatory body

Nurse licensure also establishes a registry of licensed nurses, hence the term "Registered Nurse".

The first nurse licensure and registration program was initiated in 1901 in New Zealand when the Nurses Registration Act 1901 was enacted into law. The first licensure laws in the United States came in 1903. In the US, applicants must successfully pass the NCLEX exam prior to being granted a license.

== Opposition ==
In the United States, some states such as Louisiana have sought to loosen licensure requirements as unnecessary barriers to employment.
