= Doctor of Nursing Science =

Academic research degree

The Doctor of Nursing Science (D.N.S. or D.N.Sc.) is an academic research degree awarded in a number of countries throughout the world as a terminal research degree in nursing. The title of this degree varies with the collegiate institution which grants it. Another form of this degree is a Doctor of Science in Nursing (D.S.N.) degree. This academic research degree is recognized by both the United States Department of Education and the National Science Foundation to be equivalent to the more commonly awarded Doctor of Philosophy Ph.D.
