= National Council Licensure Examination =

US nationwide examination for licensing of nurses

- Next Generation NCLEX logo
- Acronym: NCLEX
- Type: computerized adaptive testing
- Administrator: National Council of State Boards of Nursing
- Skills tested: Nursing science
- Purpose: Prerequisite to nurse licensure in the US and Canada
- Year started: 1982 in United States; 2015 in Canada
- Regions: United States, Canada and Australia
- Languages: English and French
- Annual number of test takers: NCLEX-RN: ▲358,998 (in 2023); NCLEX-PN: ▼65,679 (in 2023)
- Prerequisites: Candidate must be a graduate of an approved nursing school. Fluency in English assumed.
- Fee: $200 USD or $360 CAD
- Used by: State Boards of Nursing in United States and Board of Nursing in 10 Canadian provinces
- Qualification rate: NCLEX-RN: ▲69.66% (in 2023); NCLEX-PN: ▲74.54% (in 2023)
- Website: www.nclex.com

The National Council Licensure Examination (NCLEX) is a nationwide examination for the licensing of nurses in the United States and Canada since 1982 and 2015, respectively. There are two types: the NCLEX-RN and the NCLEX-PN. After graduating from a school of nursing, one takes the NCLEX exam to receive a nursing license. A nursing license gives an individual the permission to practice nursing, granted by the state where they met the requirements. NCLEX examinations are developed and owned by the National Council of State Boards of Nursing, Inc. (NCSBN). The NCSBN administers these examinations on behalf of its member boards, which consist of the boards of nursing in the 50 states, the District of Columbia, and four U.S. territories, American Samoa, Guam, Northern Mariana Islands, and the U.S. Virgin Islands.

To ensure public protection, each board of nursing requires a candidate for licensure to pass the appropriate NCLEX examination: the NCLEX-RN for registered nurses and the NCLEX-PN for vocational or practical nurses. NCLEX examinations are designed to test the knowledge, skills, and abilities essential for the safe and effective practice of nursing at the entry level.

NCLEX examinations are provided in a computerized adaptive testing (CAT) format and are presently administered by Pearson VUE in their network of Pearson Professional Centers (PPC). With computerized exams such as this, the computer selects which question you are asked based on how you answered the previous question. The NCLEX covers a wide range of material. The individual will be scored on their ability to think critically about decisions involving nursing care.

== History ==
Following the establishment of state boards of nursing in the early 20th century, each board independently developed and administered its own licensure exams. After the start of World War II, state boards of nursing came under increasing pressure to expedite licensing and schedule exams more frequently. In response, participants at a 1942 National League of Nursing Education's (NLNE) National Committee on Nursing Tests conference proposed a "pooling of tests" as a solution, wherein each state would prepare and contribute exams in one or more subjects that could serve as a source of test items. The State Board Test Pool Examination (SBTPE) was given in 15 states during its initial testing year of 1944. By 1950, the SBTPE was used in all 48 states, with each jurisdiction establishing its own pass threshold. The American Nurses Association (ANA) took over management of the SBTPE in 1955, which at the time had 600 questions (plus 120 validator questions) divided into 4 sections and was administered over multiple days. The NCSBN was created in 1978 and took ownership of the SBTPE and, in 1982, replaced the SBTPE with NCLEX. The NCLEX, which was at the time a test administered using paper and pencil, decreased the total number of questions from 720 to 480 (including up to 75 pilot questions, which had no bearing on the final score). The following year, in 1983, NCSBN once more lowered the number of questions to 370 (including as many as 70 pilot questions). As a paper exam, NCLEX was only provided twice a year. The NCLEX-RN was given over two days in February and November, while the NCLEX-PN was given over a single day in April and October.

In 1994, the NCSBN converted the NCLEX from a paper-and-pencil format to a computerized adaptive testing (CAT) format. Questions for the CAT test were selected from a test bank of 1,700–2,000 pretested, statistically analyzed questions that were coded according to topic and degree of difficulty. Other changes included with the new CAT test were that the test now took less than a day and was administered throughout the year. In addition to multiple-choice format questions, the NCSBN began including alternative item formats for the NCLEX-RN in October 2003.

In 2015, NCLEX was adopted in Canada, with changes made to address measuring units, drug names, and other terminology differences between the United States and Canada. Additionally, the NCLEX is available in Canadian French for French-speaking Canadians. In 2020, the Nursing and Midwifery Board of Australia (NMBA) began using NCLEX as the multiple-choice question examination for internationally qualified RNs seeking licensure in Australia.

In response to the COVID-19 pandemic in 2020, the NCSBN and Pearson VUE made temporary changes to NCLEX exams administered through September 30, 2020. The exam's difficulty level and passing standards remained the same; however, the test format was adjusted to a maximum testing time of four hours, a minimum of 60 items, and a maximum of 130 items, along with the removal of pretest items and special research sections. Additional measures at test centers included health screening protocols, mask requirements, extended operational hours, state-level capacity waivers, and the opening of temporary high-capacity test centers.

The NCSBN developed an updated version of the NCLEX called the "Next Generation NCLEX (NGN)," which went into effect April 1, 2023.

As of 2026, the NCSBN is developing a remote-proctored version of the NCLEX to allow both domestic and international candidates to complete the examination outside of traditional testing centers. This optional format will utilize 360-degree video monitoring and mobile technology to help maintain exam security.

The governing body responsible for making changes to the NCLEX is the National Council of State Boards of Nursing (NCSBN). They make changes by analyzing current nursing practices. They do this by surveying approximately 12,000 recently licensed nurses about different nursing activities that appear on the NCLEX. The NCSBN analyzes these nursing activities based on how frequently they may occur, how they could impact the patient's safety, and the location of these activities. The NCSBN conducts these analyses every three years and then makes any needed changes to the exam.

== Levels of examination ==
=== NCLEX-RN ===
NCLEX-RN (National Council Licensure Examination-Registered Nurse). All boards of nursing in the states and territories of the United States require candidates to pass this exam for licensure as a registered nurse (RN). As of 2015, 10 provincial and territorial RN regulators in Canada have chosen the NCLEX-RN and the National Council of State Boards of Nursing (NCSBN) as the provider of the Canadian RN entry-to-practice exam. The Nursing and Midwifery Board of Australia (NMBA) also uses the NCLEX as the multiple-choice question examination for internationally qualified RNs seeking licensure.

The NCLEX-RN uses the five-step nursing process. Each of the questions will fall into one of the five steps: assessment, diagnosis, planning, implementation, and evaluation.

=== NCLEX-PN ===
NCLEX-PN (National Council Licensure Examination-Practical Nurse). All US state and territorial boards of nursing require a passing result on the exam for licensure as a licensed practical nurse (LPN) or licensed vocational nurse (LVN).

== Exam content ==
The majority of test items are written at the cognition level of application or higher, but the exam may include items at all cognitive levels. Examples of cognitive level are memorization or recall, knowledge, analysis and application.

=== NCLEX-PN ===
The exam's content is based on client needs:

- Safe Effective Care Environment
  - Coordination of Care
  - Safety and Infection Control
- Health Promotion and Maintenance
- Psychosocial Integrity
- Physiological Integrity
  - Basic Care and Comfort
  - Pharmacological and Parenteral Therapies
  - Reduction of Risk Potential
  - Physiological Adaptation

=== NCLEX-RN ===
The exam's content is based on client needs:

- Safe and Effective Care Environment
  - Management of Care 17–23%
  - Safety and Infection Control 9–15%
- Health Promotion and Maintenance 6–12%
- Psychosocial Integrity 6–12%
- Physiological Integrity
  - Basic Care and Comfort 6–12%
  - Pharmacological and Parenteral Therapies
  - Reduction of Risk Potential 9–15%
  - Physiological Adaptation 11–17%

=== Physiological Integrity ===
The Physiological Integrity category contains the majority of the questions on the exam, about 43–67 percent. This portion of the NCLEX deals with adult medical and surgical care, pediatrics, and gerontology, which is the study of the elderly and the effects of aging. Some of the questions may deal with conditions that nurses treat on a regular basis such as diabetes, cardiovascular disorders, neurological disorders, renal diseases, and respiratory diseases. In addition, questions on traumatic injuries, immunological disorders, skin disorders and infectious diseases could be asked. There are different topics on the NCLEX pertaining to the pediatric client. These topics may include growth and development, birth abnormalities, child abuse, common infectious diseases of children, and usual childhood traumas such as burn injuries and fractures.

=== Safe and Effective Care Environment ===
This category makes up approximately 21–33 percent of the NCLEX questions. Questions in this category cover safety issues in patient care, particularly the administration of medicine to patients, safety measures to prevent further injuries and infections, isolation precautions, safety for pediatric patients, and special safety precautions for patients with psychiatric problems.

This portion of the exam may also include questions pertaining to laboratory tests, test results, and unique nursing procedures that may be associated with test results; ethical and legal nursing problems; nursing management; and issues related to giving patients the best care. NCLEX questions on these topics are randomly spread throughout the exam.

=== Health Promotion and Maintenance ===
The Health Promotion and Maintenance category makes up about 12 percent of the NCLEX examination. Questions under this category deal with birth control measures, pregnancy, labor and delivery; care for a newborn infant, growth and development, and diseases that can spread easily like sexually transmitted infections. If a patient is pregnant, it is very important that the nurse be able to act as a teacher or counselor for the patient. This makes it necessary to understand all components of a patient's pregnancy. Knowledge of a proper diet, development of the fetus, signs and symptoms of pregnancy complications and certain pregnancy related procedures will be helpful for this section of the exam.

=== Psychosocial Integrity ===
Like the section on Health Promotion and Maintenance, the Psychosocial Integrity category constitutes approximately 12 percent of the NCLEX questions. Questions in this category pertain to patients with psychiatric problems and their unique issues. In addition, this material may cover coping mechanisms for different situations. Other situations covered in this section are about psychosocial problems that fall short of psychiatric illness. Questions could cover information on the following disorders: depression, schizophrenia, organic mental disorders, eating disorders, personality disorders, and anxiety disorders. Also included in this section may be questions about crisis intervention, substance abuse, and therapy through communication.

== Format ==
The NCLEX exam is taken on a computer at a Pearson Professional Center. Pearson Professional Centers are testing centers for certifications and licenses all over the world. There are numerous testing centers in each state of the U.S. and centers can be found in 175 countries. The NCLEX exam consists of multiple-choice questions, questions that require choosing all of the correct answers from a list of options, putting a number of steps in the correct sequence, or identifying a correct area on a picture. Some of these alternative format questions ask information about a chart, graph, or audio clip. The questions can also use pictures as the answer choices instead of words. Each question will appear one at a time on a computer screen. Questions will not be repeated; however, questions based on a similar situation could be asked.

Each individual will take a different form of the exam. Since each question depends on how the previous question is answered, an individual can be given between 75 and 145 questions. Only 60 out of the first 75 questions on the exam will count. The 15 that do not count are "trial" questions, and these will be used on future examinations. The "trial" questions are not identified as such, therefore, it is best to answer every question. If the individual continues to get questions from the same category, it could mean that the NCSBN is testing those types of questions, or it could mean that the individual keeps getting those types of questions incorrect. The computer will continue to randomly generate questions from that category until the individual has met the requirements of the test plan.

Each individual will have a maximum of five hours to complete the exam, but there is no minimum time limit. There is a mandatory 10-minute break about 2½ hours after the start of the exam and another optional break after about 4 hours of testing. It is acceptable to take breaks any time during the exam, however, test-takers will lose the additional break time from the total test time.

A certain number of correctly answered questions is not required to pass the exam. An individual's score will not be compared to other scores to determine if he or she passes. The NCLEX is graded by comparing the responses to a pre-established standard. Those individuals who meet or exceed the standard pass the exam, those who do not fail.

=== Question types ===
Most of the questions of the NCLEX exam are worded questions with multiple choice answers. In recent years, however, the NCSBN has added new format questions which do not involve simple multiple-choice selection. Examples of the new formats include identifying and selecting a particular area of a drawn body part, selecting multiple correct answers via check boxes, free response mathematical questions usually involving medication calculations, and ordering the steps of a medical or nursing procedure.

Questions on the NCLEX exam are of three different types or levels: Level 1, Level 2, and Level 3. Level 1 questions are the most basic questions and make up less than 10 percent of the total questions. Level 1 questions test the individual's knowledge and understanding. These questions require the individual to recall specific facts and information. Level 2 questions require an additional level of thinking in order to answer the question. In these types of questions, the individual will be required to know specific information and then use it to interpret or analyze the question. Level 2 questions are analysis and application type questions. Level 3 questions are the most complex type of question on the NCLEX. These questions require the individual to judge, evaluate, and combine information. The individual will have to apply the rules, facts, and processes they know and then make decisions about what is best for the patient's care based on the situation. What makes level 3 questions difficult is the likely existence of more than one correct answer forcing the individual to decide which answer is the best choice. Level 2 and Level 3 questions make up about 95 percent of the questions on the NCLEX exam. However, it is possible for the exam to have no Level 1 question.

Multiple education platforms offer test preparation programs that aim to help students study and pass the exams. Kaplan, UWorld, and Khan Academy offer sample questions mirroring the actual exam to assist in active and personalized learning.

== Next-Generation NCLEX (NGN) ==
A new format for the NCLEX launched in April 2023. The new format aims to put more emphasis on clinical judgment and decision-making abilities. The NGN presents a modified examination format, along with new question types.

== See also ==
- Nurse licensure
- Professional licensure in the United States
- HESI exam
