= Nurse anesthetist =

Advanced Practice Registered Nurse with expertise in anesthesia

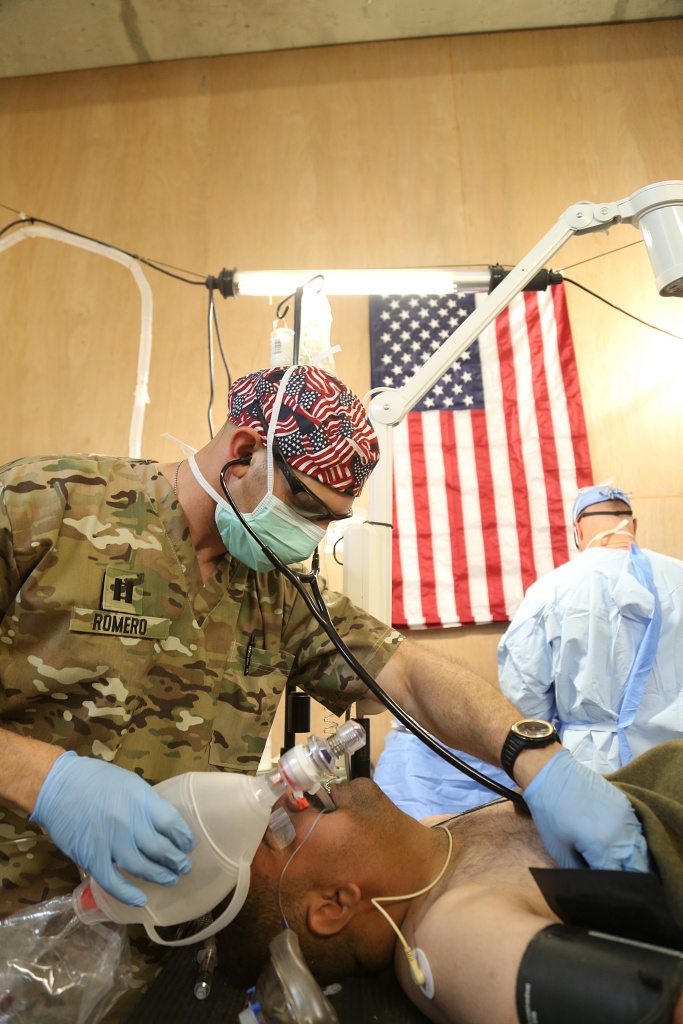
- Nurse anesthetist providing independent anesthesia on a forward surgical team

Occupation
- Activity sectors: Anesthesia, nursing

Description
- Competencies: Administration of anesthetics and the elimination of pain
- Education required: Varies by country
- Fields of employment: Hospital; Outpatient surgery centers; Ambulatory surgery centers

A nurse anesthetist is an advanced practice nurse who administers anesthesia for surgery or other medical procedures. They are involved in the administration of anesthesia in a majority of countries, with varying levels of autonomy, which may include some or all anesthesia services before, during, and after surgery. They are also concerned with patient advocacy, safety and professional development. In some localities, nurse anesthetists provide anesthesia to patients independently; in others they do so under the supervision of physicians. The International Federation of Nurse Anesthetists was established in 1989 as a forum for developing standards of education, practice, and a code of ethics.

== History ==
In the United States, nurse anesthetists are called Certified Registered Nurse Anesthetists (CRNAs). CRNAs account for approximately half of the anesthesia providers in the United States and are the main providers of anesthesia in rural America.

Nurses have been providing anesthesia care to patients since the American Civil War. Nurse anesthetists are considered an essential role to the health care workforce. They provide pain management and emergency services, including airway management and blood and fluid resuscitation, which was very important to patients in the Civil War. Depending on the local system of healthcare, they participate only during the operation itself, or may also be involved before and after (for preanesthetic assessment and immediate postoperative management). The National Association of Nurse Anesthetists professional association was established by Agatha Hodgins in 1931. It was renamed the American Association of Nurse Anesthetists in 1939. The group established educational institutions for nurse anesthetists in 1952, and established the CRNA certification in 1957. AANA continuing education was established in 1977. As of 2011, some 92% of CRNAs in the U.S. were represented by the AANA.

Scope of practice rules vary between healthcare facility and state. Before 2001, Medicare required that physicians supervise CRNAs in the administration of anesthesia. In 2001, Medicare's rules changed, allowing individual states to decide whether CRNAs may administer anesthesia without physician supervision. In the absence of a state requirement that physicians supervise CRNAs, individual healthcare facilities decide. CRNA organizations have lobbied in many states for the ability to practice without physician supervision; these efforts are opposed by physician groups. In 2011, sixteen states granted CRNAs autonomy, allowing them to practice without physician oversight. In 2017, there were 27 states in which CRNAs could independently practice (that is, "without a written collaborative agreement, supervision or conditions for practice"). In 2020, there was no physician supervision requirement for nurse anesthetists in ambulatory surgical facilities in 31 states In states that have opted out of supervision, the Joint Commission and CMS recognize CRNAs as licensed independent practitioners. In states requiring supervision, CRNAs have liability separate from supervising practitioners and are able to administer anesthesia independently of anesthesiologists.

== Education ==
A nurse anesthetist will need to complete at least three years of higher education, beyond the bachelor's of nursing degree. Prior to 2025, all nurse anesthetists (CRNAs) were required to hold a Masters in Nursing Anesthesia. As of 2025, all new nurse anesthetists require a doctoral degree in nursing anesthesia: Doctor of Nurse Anesthesia Practice (DNAP) or Doctor of Nursing Practice specializing in anesthesia (DNP), the latter of which can also teach.

Before becoming a nurse anesthetist, one must complete a Bachelors of Science in Nursing degree. A minimum of one year of full-time work experience as a registered nurse in a critical care setting is required before applying to CRNA school. The average experience of RNs entering nurse anesthesia educational programs is 2.9 years. Nurse anesthetists are required to attend accredited educational programs covering all areas of anesthesia. This education provides training about the anesthetics needed for patients in any type of procedure or surgery. After completing an accredited program, CRNAs must pass a national certification exam to acquire this designation. It is important to have the best education for this field for the significance of anesthesia.

== Salary ==
According to the U.S. Bureau of Labor Statistics, a CRNA salary is around $181,040. Salaries within the US vary by state. Overall employment for nurse anesthetists and other medical professions is projected to grow 45 percent from 2020 to 2030.

== Work environment ==
CRNAs typically work in healthcare settings such as emergency rooms, intensive care units, and operating rooms. Their environment is with medical and surgical teams with procedures that can occur anytime. Some partnerships they work with are anesthesiologists, dentists, surgeons, and other medics in serving patients who need of receiving anesthesia. Nurse anesthetists are an essential part of everyday medical facilities. The need of CRNAs is anticipated to grow.

== Skills and procedures ==
Nurse anesthetists work with anesthesiologists, surgeons, anesthesiologist assistants, anesthesia technicians, and others. CRNAs communicate with the surgeon and interdisciplinary team to design an anesthesia plan for a patient. Some procedures that nurse anesthetists offer include:

- Evaluation of the patient prior to anesthesia
- Physical assessment and pre-operative teaching before the anesthesia
- Administering anesthesia
- Airway management

== Roles and responsibilities ==
CRNAs have important roles when it comes to patient care. They need to meet all the patients' standards and help ensure the patient is in good condition before receiving an anesthesia plan. Some of the roles and responsibilities of a nurse anesthetist include:

- Bedside manner
- Record-keeping skills
- Communication skills
- Teamwork with other nurses and doctors
- Inhaled anesthesia administration
- Administration of blood and medication
- Epidural placement
- Placement of arterial and central lines

The CRNA profession requires an understanding, accurate, and responsible attitude to work this position. You must have strong communication skills with the patient and your team to become a CRNA. The freedom of a nurse anesthetist is expanded compared to an RN that allows you to oversee the patient and with your team.

== Nurse anesthetist vs. anesthesiologist ==
Nurse anesthetists and anesthesiologists share many similarities but have important distinctions. Certified registered nurse anesthetists are nurses who have undergone specialized training to administer anesthesia during surgeries and other procedures, typically resulting in a doctor of nurse anesthesia practice (DNAP) or doctor of nursing practice (DNP) degree. In comparison, an anesthesiologist is a physician (medical doctor) who has undergone residency training in the field of anesthesiology after medical school and typically holds a doctor of medicine (MD) or doctor of osteopathic medicine (DO) degree, the latter in the United States only.

While both can administer anesthesia during surgery, in many states only anesthesiologists can manage their patients perioperatively. As physicians, anesthesiologists can order and interpret a variety of laboratory and imaging studies, while nurse anesthestists can only order and interpret labs and imaging within their scope of practice. Additionally, anesthesiologists typically hold unrestricted medical licenses wherever they practice and have prescribing authority, while nurse anesthestists typically have to practice under the supervision of an anesthesiologist and cannot independently prescribe medications. The scope of practice and independent practice rights vary in each state.

== Terminology ==
The AANA recognizes Certified Registered Nurse Anesthetist, CRNA, nurse anesthetist, and nurse anesthesiologist as equivalent titles. The use of nurse anesthetist is substantially more common than the use of nurse anesthesiologist; terms anesthesia nurse and anesthetist nurse are unheard of.

Use of the term nurse anesthesiologist has been criticized by those who argue that the term anesthesiologist should be limited to medical doctors. For example, groups representing anesthesiologists and other medical doctors, such as the American Medical Association (AMA) and American Society of Anesthesiologists (ASA), oppose the use of this phrase to describe CRNAs and call it misleading.

In 2021, after a year-long rebranding effort, the American Association of Nurse Anesthetists changed its name to the American Association of Nurse Anesthesiology. The name change was condemned by physician groups, including the AMA, ASA, American Board of Anesthesiology, American Board of Medical Specialties, and American Osteopathic Association. Physicians' organizations said that the name change was "title misappropriation" that was deceptive, misleading to patients, and cause confusion in care settings.

In 2021, the New Hampshire Supreme Court upheld a decision by the New Hampshire Board of Medicine that blocked nurse anesthetists from identifying themselves as anesthesiologists and limited use of the title to MDs and DOs specializing in anesthesiology.

== United States ==
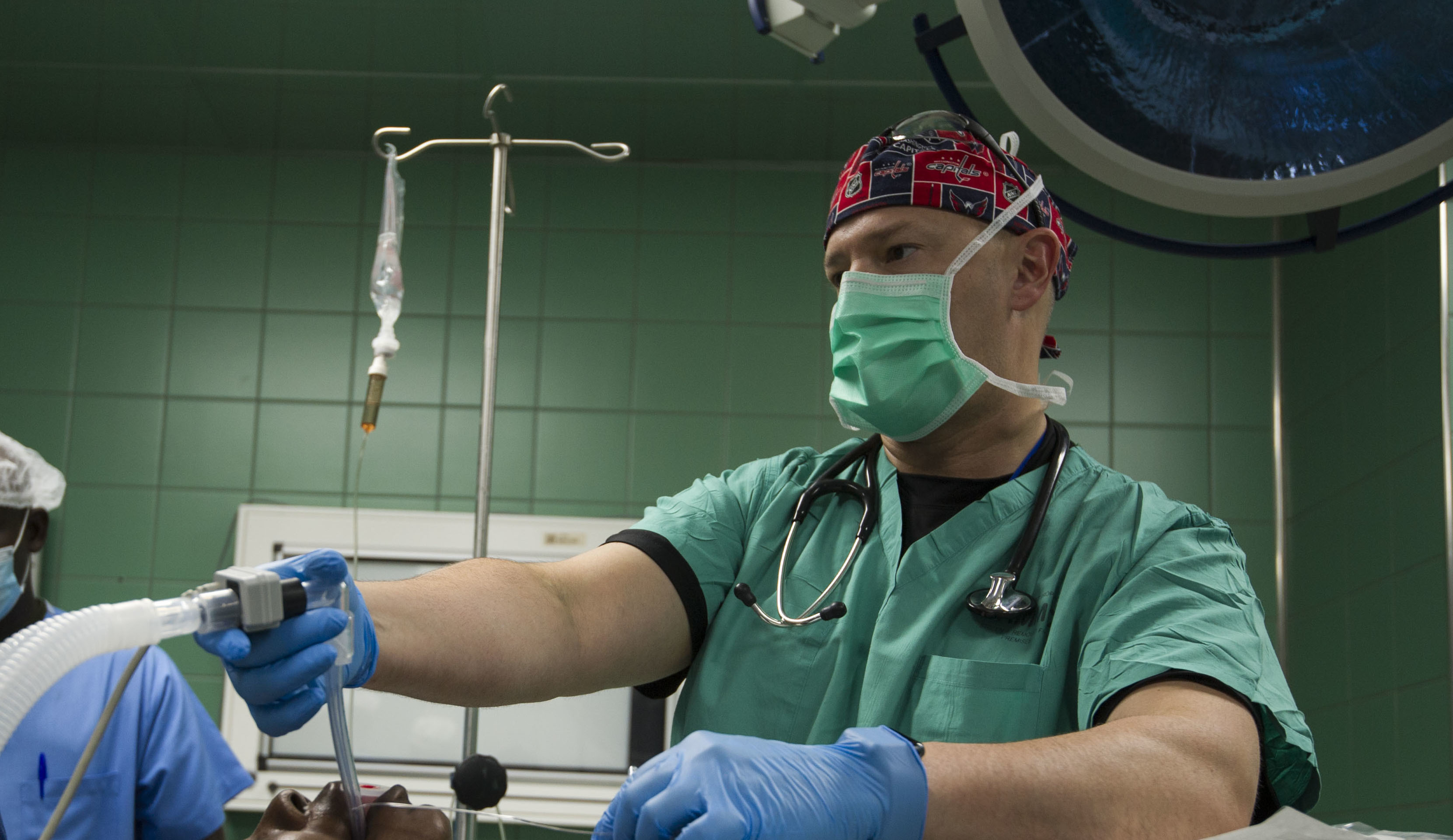
A US nurse anesthetist assisting a Ghanaian nurse anesthesist with intubation

A Certified Registered Nurse Anesthetist (CRNA) is a nurse anesthetist who is licensed to administer anesthesia in the United States. CRNAs account for approximately half of the anesthesia providers in the United States and are the main providers of anesthesia in rural America. Historically, nurse anesthetists have been providing anesthesia care to patients since the American Civil War and the CRNA credential came into existence in 1956. CRNA schools issue a master's or doctorate degree to nurses who have completed a program in anesthesia, which ranges from two to three years in length. Scope of practice and practitioner oversight requirements vary between healthcare facility and state, with 25 states and Guam granting complete autonomy as of 2024. In states that have opted out of supervision, the Joint Commission and CMS recognize CRNAs as licensed independent practitioners. In states requiring supervision, CRNAs have liability separate from supervising practitioners and are able to administer anesthesia independently of physicians, such as anesthesiologists.

== Europe ==
=== France ===
The specialty of a non-medical anesthesia professional did not exist before WWII in France. After WWII, the Hôpital de Saint-Germain-en-Laye offered practical training for paramedics and nurses. Until the 1970s, many general hospitals had no appointed physician anesthesiologists. In 1960, the Ministry of Health commissioned a certificate of competence as infirmier aide anesthésiste (IAA) for nurse anesthetists. From then onward, only specialized nurses were allowed to administer anesthesia independent of the surgeon. Similar to the situation in the USA, anesthesiologists tried to distance themselves from anesthetists. In 1974, the Professional Association of Physician Anesthesiologists submitted a Bill in order to extinguish the profession, but the bill was withdrawn and a campaign was started for the legal recognition oh the nurse anesthetist profession. In the 1980s, the profession of nurse anesthetist was nationally recognized and given the new title infirmier spécialisé en anesthésie-réanimation (ISAR). This was accompanied by an official training program and state diploma. Training to become an NA requires at least two years’ experience as a general nurse, followed by success at an examination at the end of two years’ special training in an anaesthetic nurse school teaching the acquisition of the national certification.

=== United Kingdom ===
The British Army had only ever experienced anaesthesia delivered by doctors and the arrival at the “front” of USA NAs astonished them. The great skill and care that was displayed by these NAs soon caused amazement to yield to admiration and, in 1918, classes were formed for British nursing sisters and these nurses started performing duties in various hospitals. Between the First and Second World Wars, operating theatre attendants (OTAs) or theatre porters/orderlies were helping the surgeons and anesthesiologists. After WWII, the OTA changed their names to operating theatre technician (OTT) and extended their role following the model used in the military. OTTs became the assistant to the anesthesiologist and were responsible for the anaesthesia equipment and assisted the anesthesiologist during complex tasks including transfusion, resuscitation and endotracheal intubation. Besides the OTTs, an anaesthetic nursing service was established during the eighties. These relatively few registered anaesthetic nurses could take more responsibility in comparison to the OTT and were, for example, allowed to administer drugs and to set up intravenous infusions. The prospect of training non-medical anaesthesia professionals to administer anaesthesia had been suggested, intermittently, for several years, but has been resisted strongly by the Association of Anaesthetists of Great Britain and Ireland In Europe, only Belgium and the UK have relied entirely on physician-based anaesthesia but, in recent years, experimental training schemes for non-medical graduates have been introduced to address the staffing crisis problem

=== Germany ===
Until after WWII, the surgeons were responsible for both operating and supervising the nurse who administered anesthesia. Anesthesia was a subspeciality of the surgical department. Because surgery became increasingly more complex, the Facharzt für Anästhesie (anaesthesia physician) was introduced and the German Society for Anesthesiology and Intensive Care was founded in 1953. In the 1960s, nurse anesthetists were utilized as a rescue solution due to a severe shortage of anaesthesiologists. NAs administered anesthesia under supervision of the surgeon and filled in for the shortage of anesthesiologists. Almost from the beginning, the German anesthesiologists worked together with an anesthesia assistant. After completing their nursing program, to become a nurse anesthetist (NA), the nurses were trained for two more years within anesthesia and intensive care. It was not until 1992 that enough anesthesiologists were trained to abandon the NA concept. In 2004, the German private HELIOS hospitals started, once again, to train nurses to become Medizinische Assistent fur Anästhesie (MAfA) comparable to the NA. To become a MAfA, nurses first had to work for at least two years in an anesthesia or intensive care department, followed by one year of practical training in anesthesia (400 hours). The training involved 200 hours of theoretical training and three days of training in an anesthesia simulator. The HELIOS hospitals initiated this MAfA training so that they could introduce parallel anesthesia, that is, one anesthesiologist giving anesthesia in two different theatres. In every OR, a MAfA would administer the anesthesia and receive supervision from the anesthesiologist. However, three weeks after certification of one of the first MAfAs, a fatal complication occurred in a healthy 18-year-old male while a MAfA was giving anesthesia. After this incident, much criticism was levelled by the National Physicians’ Board in Germany and MAfA training was stopped immediately.

=== Scandinavia ===
Initially, nurses took a great deal of responsibility for the practice of Anaesthesia in Scandinavia and worked in a fashion similar to that pertaining many other countries, under the leadership of a surgeon. Some prominent surgeons, in the mid-19th century, realised that developments in surgery required a parallel, appropriate development in anaesthesia. Scandinavian nurses developed general anaesthesia into a craft that required high levels of qualification characterised by expert knowledge, observational expertise and skills. Formal education of NAs has taken place since 1962 in Sweden, 1963 in Finland and 1965 in Norway. National societies of NAs were founded in 1960 in Sweden, 1965 in Norway and 1966 in Finland.

=== The Netherlands ===
Despite a gradual increase in the number of anaesthesiologists responsible for anaesthesia, in the first half of the 20th century, nurses and religious nuns largely took care of the anaesthetic aspects of an operation under supervision of a surgeon. Since 1966, NAs were officially trained by the Nationale Vereniging van Ziekenhuizen (National Society of Hospitals). According to a survey held in 1969, a shortage of 80–100 anaesthesiologists existed in the Netherlands. This deficit was solved by allowing NAs to administer anaesthesia but only under direct supervision of the surgeon. In 1970, the Dutch National Health Council stated that every anaesthesiologist needed the help of a qualified NA. The flexible, two-table system was henceforth only allowed if an NA stayed with the patient throughout the operation. During the end of the 1960s and early 1970s NAs were exclusively supervised by anaesthesiologists and no longer by surgeons. It was not until 1984 when the training of NAs received approval from the Ministry of Health.

== Africa ==
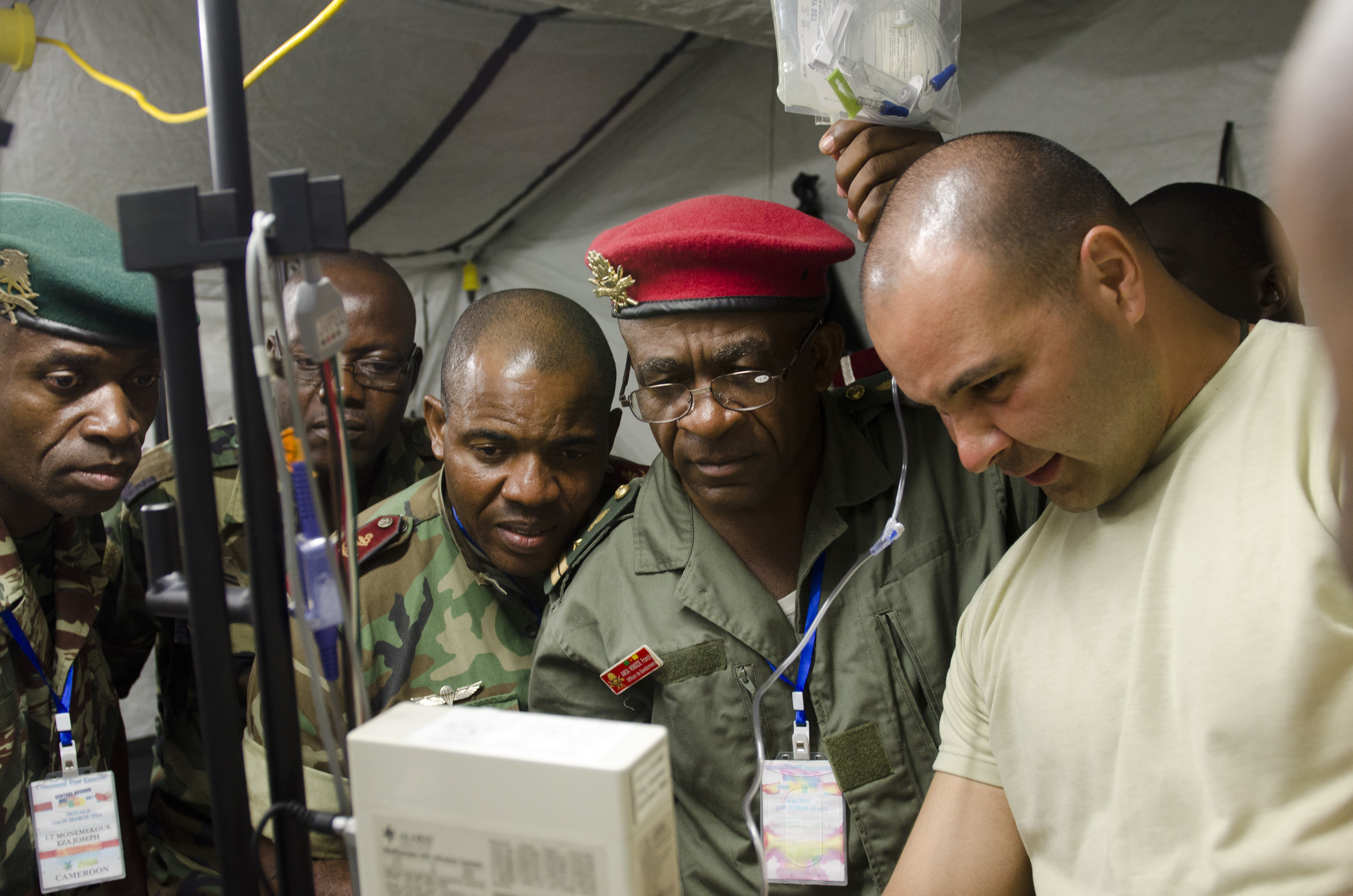
An American nurse anesthetist assists Cameroon partners with anestheisa administration

The majority of people living in African countries do not have access to safe and affordable anesthesia, analgesia, and surgical care. There are 30 distinct pathways to train as an anesthesia provider in Africa, defined as the unique combination of entry qualification, duration, and qualification awarded. A majority (73%) of countries in Africa rely on non-physician anesthesia providers (NPAP) or some form of non-physician qualification in order to practice anesthesia. Most countries had both physician and non-physician training routes. Of all the NPAP training pathways, 60% required a nursing background for entry, 14% required either nursing or other clinical experience, 12% specifically required clinical experience other than nursing, and 14% required no prior clinical experience. Physicians provided clinical supervision and curriculum teaching for NPAP programs less than half the time. Liberia, Niger, Togo, Congo, Central African Republic, South Sudan, and Eritrea currently only train nurse anesthetists in the administration of anesthesia.

== Asia ==
After 1869, Japanese medicine came under German influence such that regional anaesthesia was dominant over general anaesthesia. It was not until 1950, when American Meyer Sakland conveyed modern knowledge of anaesthesia to the Japanese, that general anaesthesia became popular and developed rapidly. Until now, there have been no non-medical anaesthesia professionals in Japan; however, recently, the debate has started regarding its potential introduction into Japanese operating theatres. In 2010, a first step was taken by starting an exchange education programme with the US. In China, the history is not much different. Some early pioneer anaesthesiologists came back from the US bringing with them the message of anaesthesia, but it was not till the early 1950s that modern anaesthesia was introduced only to come to an abrupt halt during the Cultural Revolution when only acupuncture and Chinese herbal medicine were encouraged. After 1979, anaesthesia developed rapidly and achieved independence from surgery by 1989. The role of non-medical anaesthesia professionals is very limited in China.

== Australia ==
In outback Australia, anaesthesia was frequently administered by non-medical assistants, attracting strong criticism by the medical establishment. The standard pattern of anaesthesia administration in the early 1900s in Australian cities was that the general practitioner (GP) referring the patient to the surgeon would administer the anaesthetic. In 1934, anaesthesia physicians became organised industrially and educationally very early as the Australian Society of Anaesthetists (ASA), and an early principle was that, whenever possible, one anaesthetist (and not an assistant) would care for and supervise one patient and that the anaesthetised patient would receive priority over all other activities. As nursing shortages were widespread, there was little scope for branching out into anaesthesia administration; nurses gravitated towards operating theatre scout and scrub duties. While the concept of non-medical nurse practitioners surfaced and was successful in the different states of Australia and in New Zealand, the non-medical anaesthesia professional has been more prevalent within the sub-branches of the anaesthesia services.

Physicians became the sole administrators of anaesthesia in other parts of the former British Empire – in Singapore, Malaya, Hong Kong, India, Malta, Aden and Gibraltar.

== See also ==
- Anesthesiologist
