= Board of nursing =

Type of regulatory body

A board of nursing is a regulatory body that oversees the practice of nursing within a defined jurisdiction, typically a state or province. The board typically approves and oversees schools of nursing within its jurisdiction and also handles all aspects of nurse licensure. In the US, state and territorial boards of nursing comprise the National Council of State Boards of Nursing.
