= Advanced practice nurse =

Post-graduate nursing professionals

An advanced practice nurse (APN) is a nurse with post-graduate education and training in nursing. Nurses practising at this level may work in either a specialist or generalist capacity. APNs are prepared with advanced didactic and clinical education, knowledge, skills, and scope of practice in nursing.

In the United States, the National Council of State Boards of Nursing along with other nursing authorities and organizations recommend the use of the term and acronym advanced practice registered nurse (APRN) as described in the Consensus Model for APRN Regulation, Licensure, Accreditation, Certification and Education.

== Education, accreditation, and certification ==
APNs or APRNs are intended to demonstrate effective integration of theory, practice and experiences along with increasing degrees of autonomy in judgments and interventions, while remaining under physician supervision. Post-graduate education is designed to teach an APRN to use multiple approaches to decision-making, manage the care of individuals and groups, engage in collaborative practices with the patient or client to achieve best outcomes; provide a supportive environment for colleagues; manage the utilization of staff and physical resources; engage in ethically justifiable nursing practice; protect the rights of individuals and groups; engage in activities to improve nursing practice; develop therapeutic and caring relationships; fulfill the conduct requirements of the profession; act to enhance the professional development of self; and function in accordance with legislation and common law affecting nursing practice.

APRN education forms the basis of four recognized general areas of specialization:

- Clinical Nurse Specialist (CNS)
- Certified Registered Nurse Anesthetist (CRNA)
- Certified Nurse-Midwife (CNM)
- Certified Nurse Practitioner (CNP)

Each specialty can have concentrations in a specific field or patient population.

As of 2023, an APRN in the United States may hold a Master of Science in Nursing (MSN), Doctor of Nursing Practice (DNP), or Doctor of Nurse Anesthesia Practice (DNAP) degree.

In 2004, The American Association of Colleges of Nursing (AACN) in conjunction with the National Council of State Boards of Nursing (NCSBN) recommended that advanced practice registered nurses move the entry-level degree to the doctorate level by 2015. Accordingly, all APN training programs are recommended (but not required as of yet) to convert their master's degree to a Doctor of Nursing Practice (DNP) degree by 2015. Although the American Association of Nurse Anesthetists approved this recommendation, it is not requiring program compliance until 2025.

The majority of programs will grant a DNP degree. Because 45% of the nurse anesthesia programs are located in schools of allied health, these programs will award a Doctor of Nurse Anesthesia Practice (DNAP). The DNP will be the direct-entry, minimum academic requirement for advanced practice registered nurses; it is a clinical/practice-based doctorate but because it is not the entry degree for the profession of nursing (which includes advanced practice registered nursing), it is a terminal degree.

== Regulation ==
=== Advance Practice Nursing in the United States ===
The preferred regulator term for advanced practice nursing in the United States is Advanced Practice Registered Nurse. Nursing in the United States is regulated at the state level. The National Council of State Boards of Nursing (NCSBN) drafts consensus models of proposed legislation for the individual states to implement. In 2008, the NCSBN's APRN consensus model identified four roles:

- Certified registered nurse anesthetist
- Certified nurse-midwife
- Clinical nurse specialist
- Certified nurse practitioner

== Post-nominal initials ==
The specific titles, credentials and post-nominal initials used by advanced practice nurses will vary greatly by country, state and educational level.

A list of post-nominal initials include, but are not limited to:

- ACNP: Acute Care Nurse Practitioner
- AGACNP: Adult-Gerontology Acute Care Nurse Practitioner
- ANP: Adult Nurse Practitioner
- APHN: Advanced Public Health Nurse
- APRN: Advanced Practice Registered Nurse (Refers to the four recognized general areas of advanced professional specialization: CRNA, NP, CNM, and CNS)
- APN: Advanced Practice Nurse (same as Advanced Practice Registered Nurse but not recommended as a legally recognized title)
- ARNP: Advanced Registered Nurse Practitioner (refers to Nurse Practitioners in some states in the US)
- C or BC following a title: Certified or Board Certified (i.e., APRN-BC, WHNP-BC, PNP-BC, FNP-C, GNP-C, ANP-BC)
- CMCN: Certified Managed Care Nurse
- CNM: Certified Nurse Midwife
- CNP: Certified Nurse Practitioner
- CNS: Clinical Nurse Specialist
- CRNP: Certified Registered Nurse Practitioner
- CS: Clinical Specialist
- CRNA: Certified Registered Nurse Anesthetist
- DNP: Doctor of Nursing Practice (the terminal professional degree for APNs)
- FNP: Family Nurse Practitioner
- GNP: Gerontological Nurse Practitioner
- NNP: Neonatal Nurse Practitioner
- NP: Nurse Practitioner
- ONP: Oncology Nurse Practitioner
- PMHCNS: Psychiatric & Mental Health Clinical Nurse Specialist
- PMHNP: Psychiatric & Mental Health Nurse Practitioner
- PNP: Pediatric Nurse Practitioner
- PNP-AC: Pediatric Nurse Practitioner- Acute Care
- PsyNP: Psychiatric Nurse Practitioner
- WHNP: Women's Health Nurse Practitioner

== See also ==
- Nurse practitioner
