= Martha K. Schwebach =

American nurse practitioner (1939–2025)

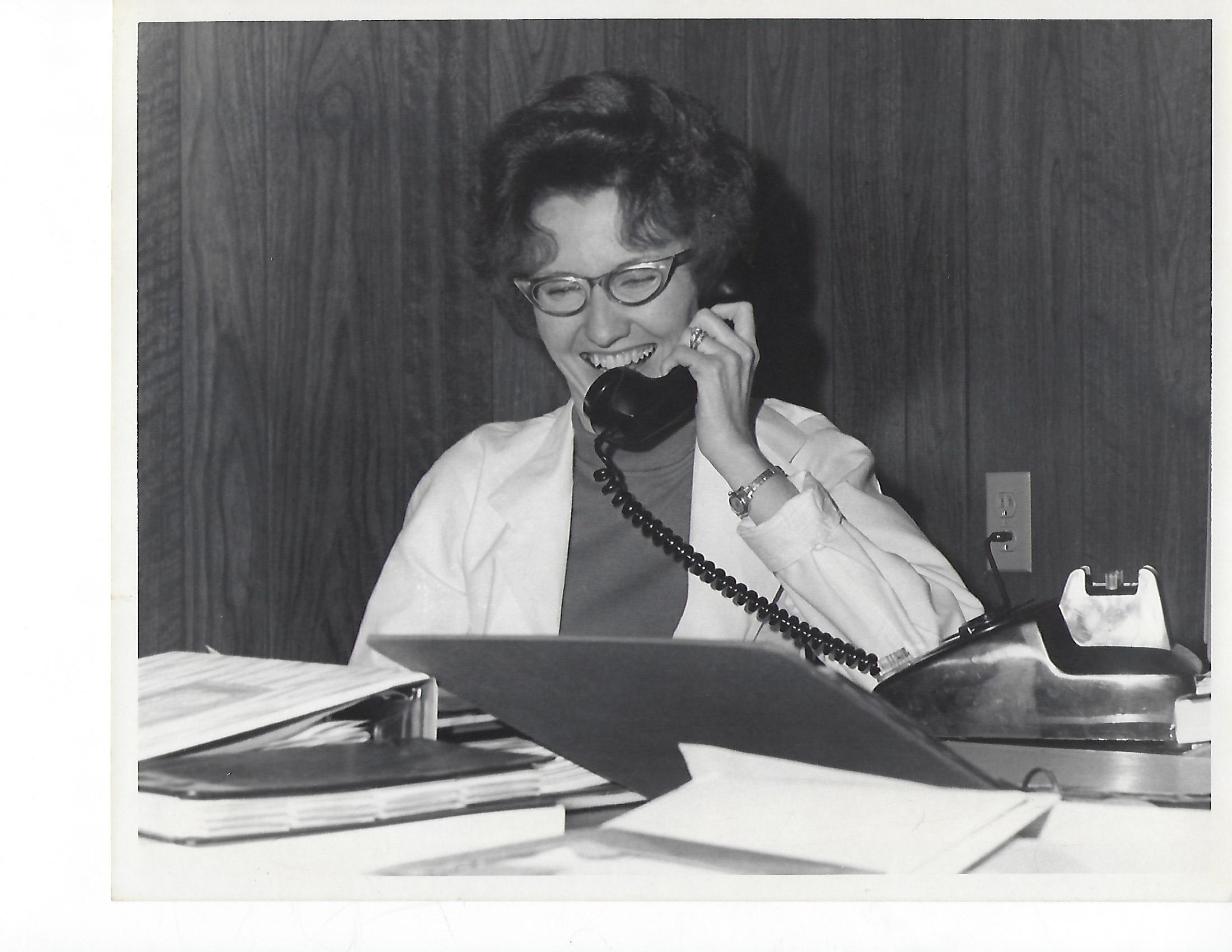
- Born: February 3, 1939; Pratt, Kansas, U.S.
- Died: July 9, 2025 (aged 86); Albuquerque, New Mexico, U.S.
- Education: Dominican School of Nursing, University of New Mexico School of Medicine
- Known for: First family nurse practitioner in the United States
- Spouse: Don Schwebach
- Awards: Ten Outstanding Young Americans; Governor's Award for Outstanding New Mexico Women; Nursing Legend Award
- Scientific career
- Fields: Medicine, Nurse practitioner

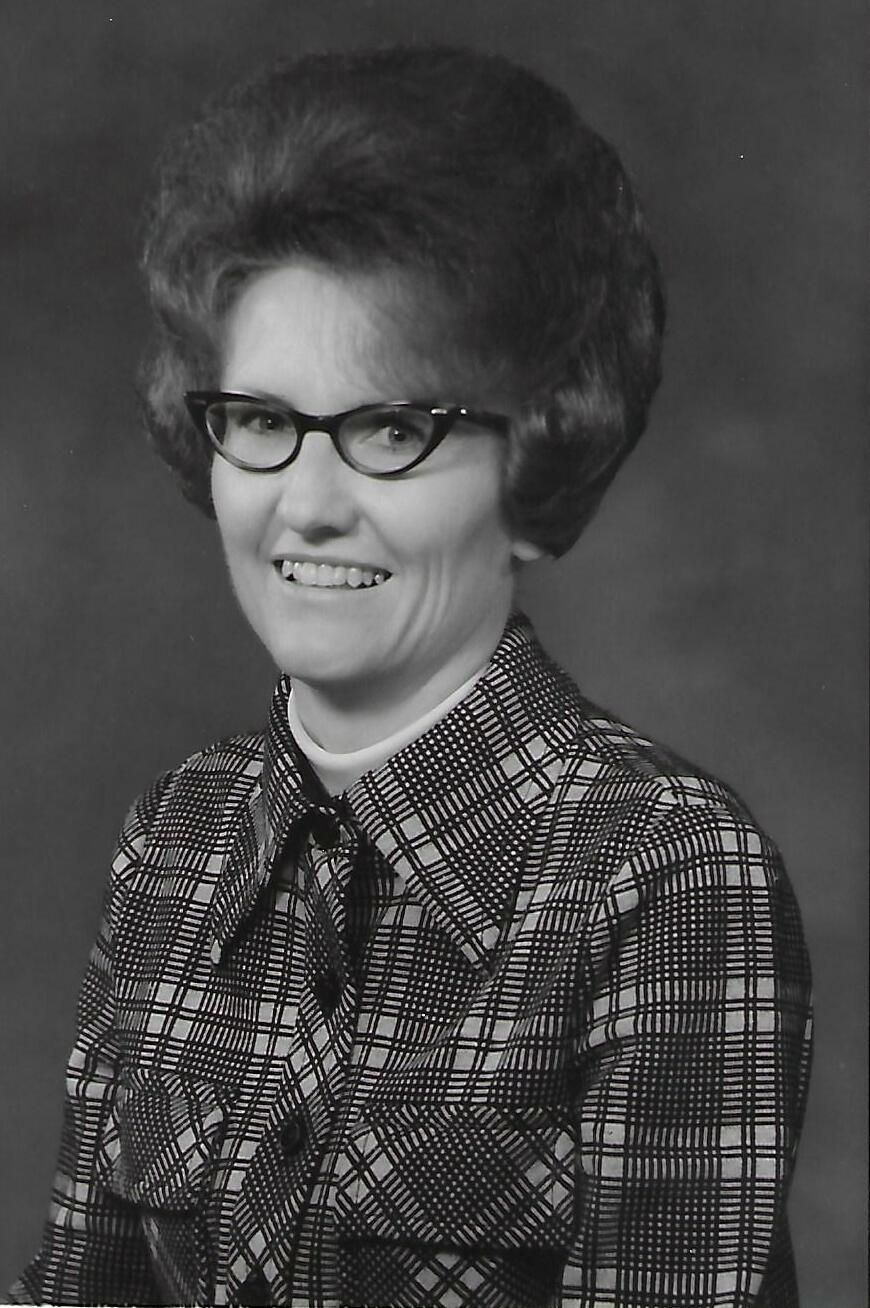

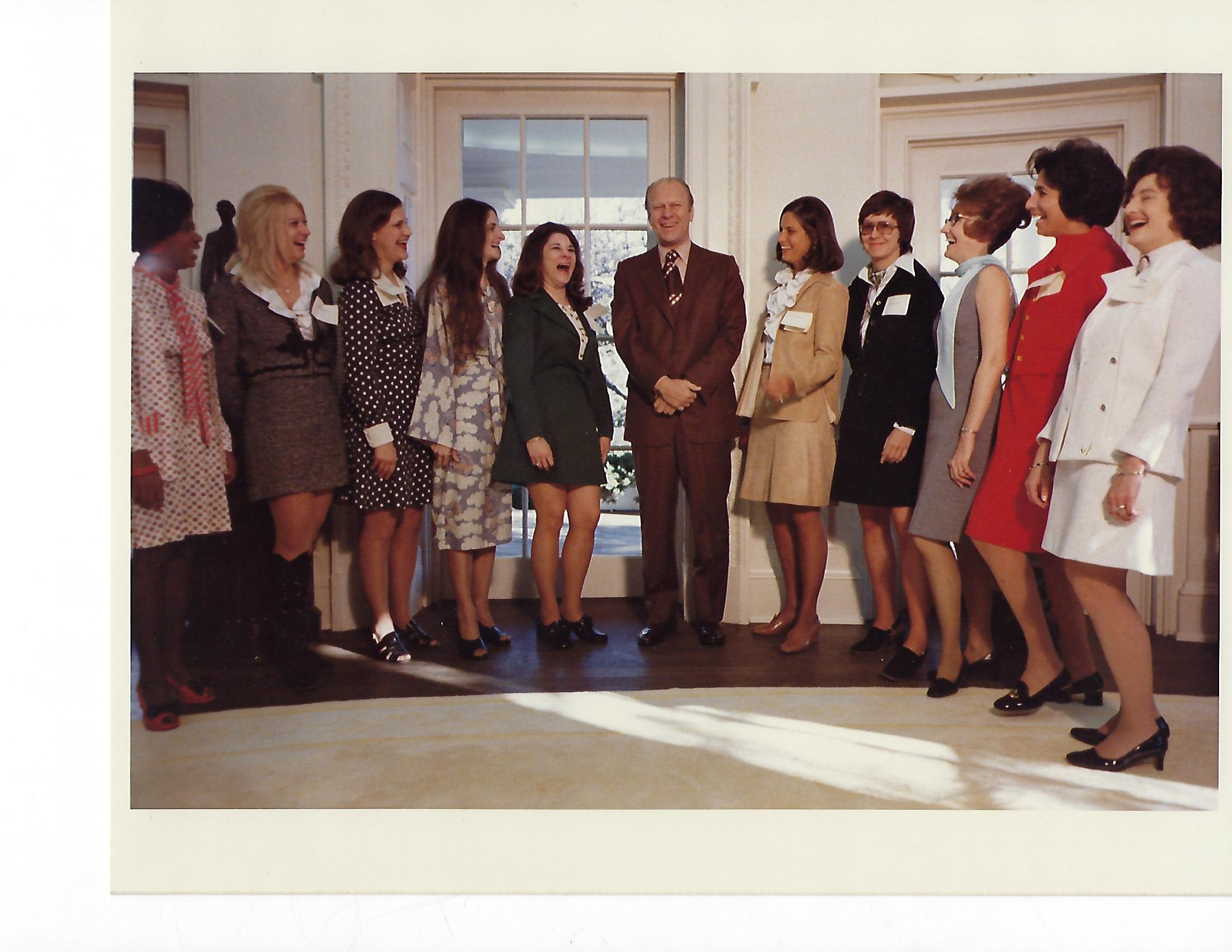
Martha Schwebach (third from the right) meets with President Gerald Ford in the Oval Office, along with the other honorees of the Ten Outstanding Young Women of America award in 1974

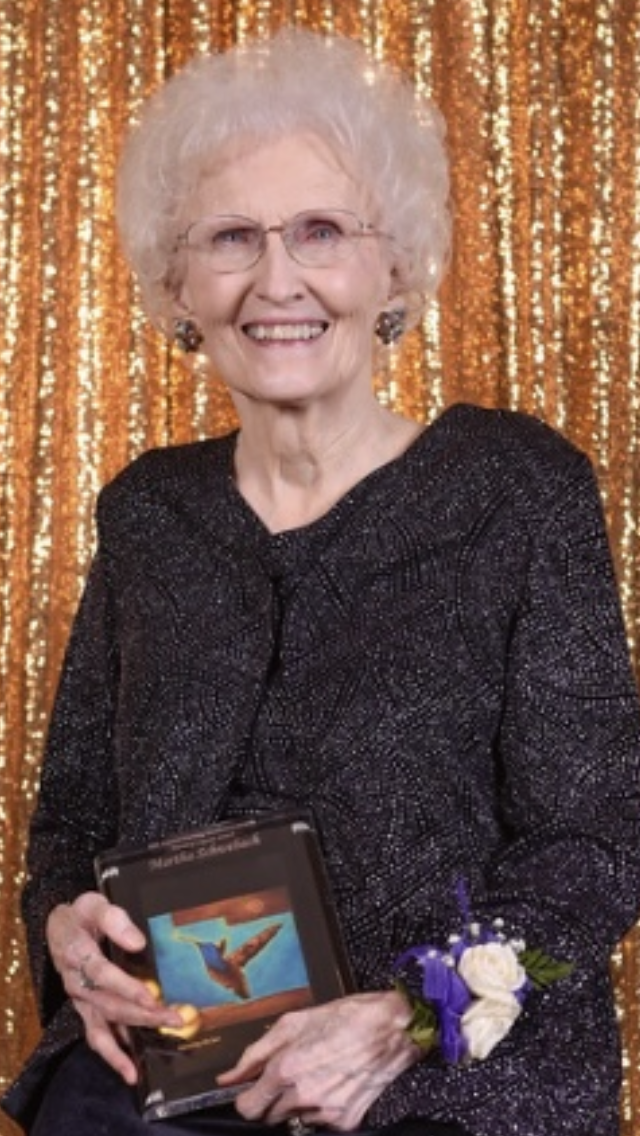
Martha Schwebach holds her Nursing Legend Award.

Martha K. Schwebach (February 3, 1939 – July 9, 2025) was the first family nurse practitioner in the United States. After joining a pilot program at the University of New Mexico designed to address a physician shortage in non-metropolitan and rural areas, Schwebach received her certification in 1969 and went on to practice in the Estancia Valley and Moriarty, New Mexico. In 1974, she was honored at the White House as one of Ten Outstanding Young Women of America. Schwebach worked as a family nurse practitioner and clinic administrator in rural New Mexico until her retirement in 2006, during which years she also wrote, lectured, and consulted in various locations across the United States on the special health care needs of rural America.

== Life and career ==
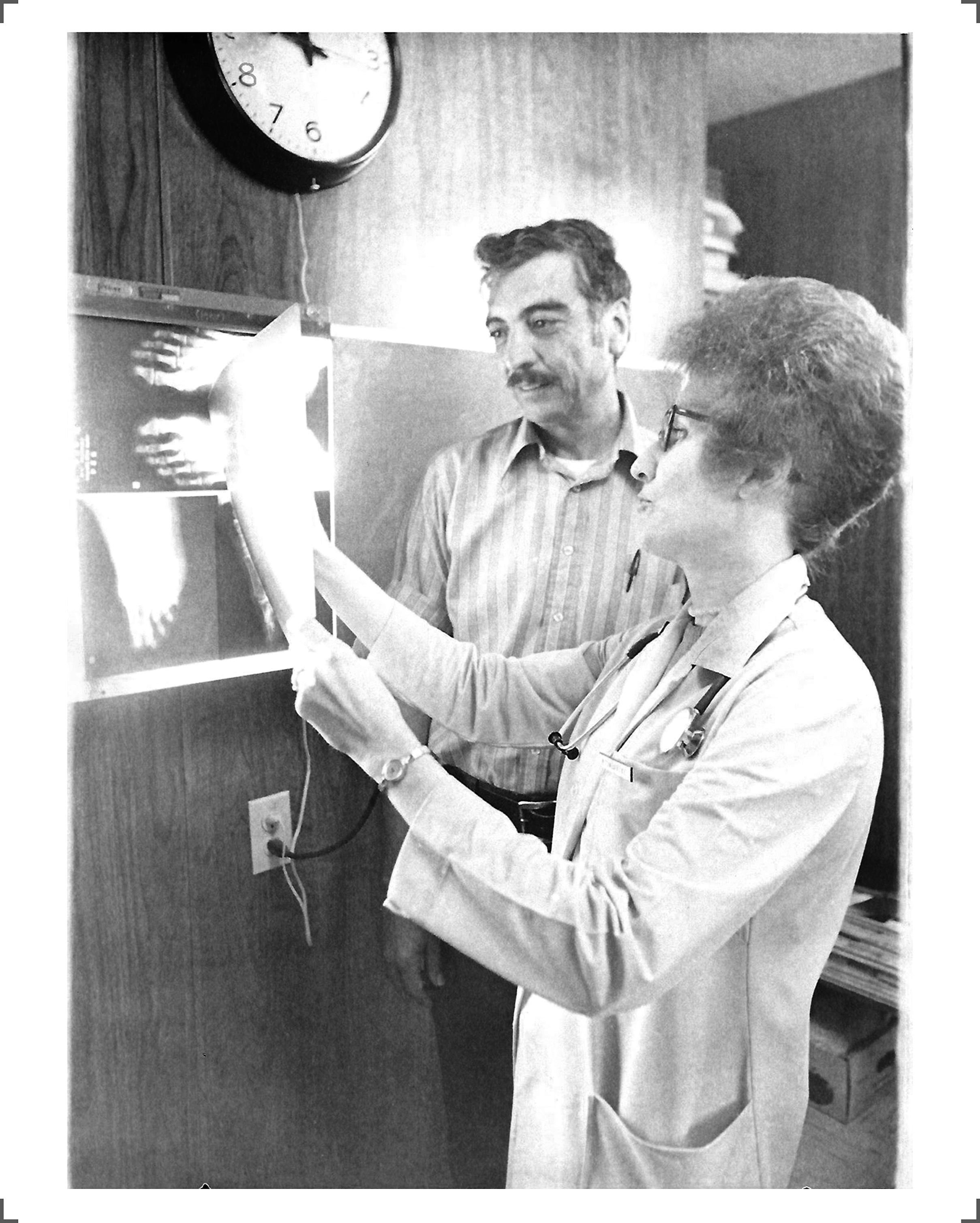
Martha Schwebach examines an X-ray with a patient

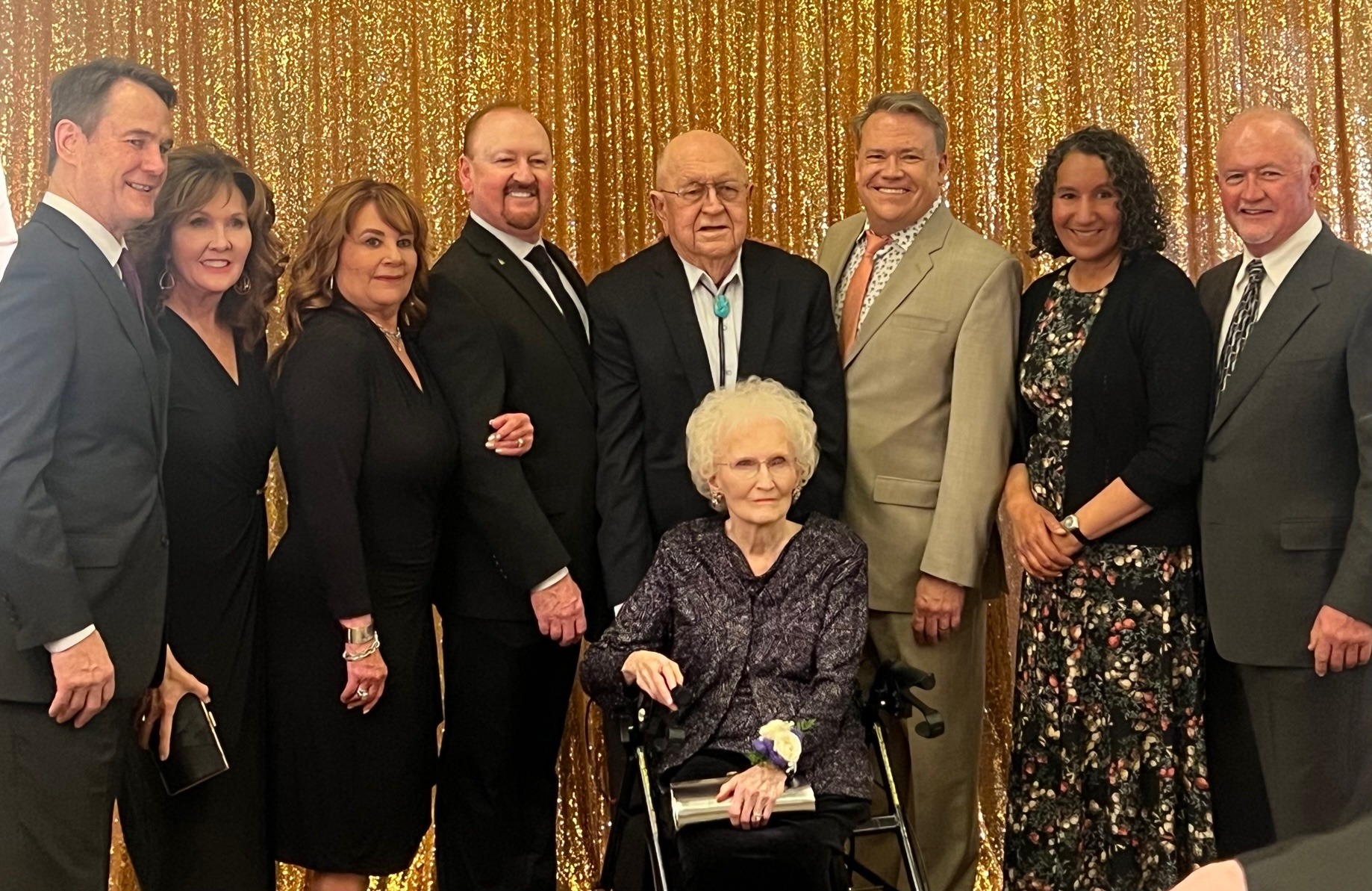
Martha Schwebach sits in the middle of her family at the 2023 awards ceremony for the New Mexico Center for Nursing Excellence.

Martha K. Schwebach was born Martha Sue Keene to Sidney and Alice Keene in Pratt, Kansas, on February 3, 1939. Schwebach attended the Dominican School of Nursing at Great Bend, Kansas (Class of 1960). After graduating, she worked "as a surgical, obstetrical, school and medical office nurse" in Albuquerque and Estancia. Between September 1968 and January 1969, Schwebach participated in an intensive certification pilot program at the University of New Mexico School of Medicine, becoming the nation's first family nurse practitioner. The nation's first nurse practitioner program, established at the University of Colorado in 1965 by Henry Silver and Loretta Ford, trained pediatric nurse practitioners rather than family nurse practitioners. The University of New Mexico project, which was designed to improve healthcare at all ages by addressing a shortage of physicians across the country and especially in rural areas, was developed by physicians Robert Oseasohn and Edward Mortimer, who visited Hope Clinic in the rural Estancia Valley on a weekly basis during Schwebach's tenure.

On April 4, 1977, Schwebach opened the Moriarty Medical Clinic. In 1981, she established the Central New Mexico Medical Center in Moriarty, where she worked until 2003 before becoming locum tenens until her retirement in 2006.

Schwebach was selected as one of the Ten Outstanding Young Women of America in 1974, an honor for which she was recognized by President Gerald Ford. In 1990, she received the Governor's Award for Outstanding New Mexico Women from the New Mexico Commission on the Status of Women. The New Mexico Center for Nursing Excellence honored her with a Nursing Legend Award on April 15, 2023.

Schwebach died on July 9, 2025, at the age of 86.

== Impact ==
Nurse practitioners filled a critical gap in United States rural healthcare. By training nurses to treat patients of all ages—providing "health check-ups ... birth control services, antepartal and postpartal care, maintenance of the chronically ill, and care in the case of acute illness or accident"—family nurse practitioners were able provide care for areas unable to maintain a doctor. As The Wall Street Journal noted in the early 1970s, the number of nurse practitioners (or "supernurses") grew rapidly: "Supernurses, almost all of them women, didn't exist a decade ago; today there are some 10,000". A writer for The Washington Star pointed out that the nurse practitioner role "reflected new career fields for women".
