= 1962 Oregon State Senate election =

- November 6, 1962

16 of 30 seats in the Oregon State Senate (15 regular, 1 unexpired) 16 seats needed for a majority
	Majority party	Minority party
Leader	Harry D. Boivin	Anthony Yturri
Party	Democratic	Republican
Leader's seat	18th district (Note: Redistricted to the 15th district)	21st district (Note: Redistricted to the 16th district)
Seats before	20	10
Seats won	9	7
Seats after	21	9
Popular vote	681,169	528,793
Percentage	56.29%	43.70%
- Results by party Republican gain Republican hold Democratic gain Democratic hold No election Asterisk (District 12): special election
Senate President before election
Harry D. Boivin
Democratic
Elected Senate President
Ben Musa
Democratic

Elections to the Oregon State Senate were held on November 6, 1962, to elect 15 candidates to the Senate to serve four-year terms, and one to fill the two-year remainder of an unexpired term. The Democratic Party won 9 seats to the Republicans' 7, resulting in a Senate composition of 21 Democrats and 9 Republicans, a net gain of one for the Democrats.

This was the first election held under the new reapportionment plan passed after the 1960 U.S. census.

== Reapportionment ==
Both chambers of the Oregon Legislative Assembly were reapportioned following the 1960 census. The number of Senate districts was reduced from 21 to 19, with the number of senators being kept at 30:

- Multnomah County (District 12) and Lane County (District 3) were given one additional senator each.
- Benton County (old 13th district) and Polk County (old 8th district) were combined into the new single-seat District 10.
- Yamhill County (old 9th district) lost its own senator and was made to share its senator with Washington County in the new floterial District 8.
- In Eastern Oregon, the old 19th and 20th districts were combined into the new District 17, swapping Baker County to District 16 (old 21st district).
- These districts did not have their boundaries changed, but were renumbered:
  - District 10 → District 9
  - District 15 → District 13
  - District 16 → District 18
  - District 17 → District 19
  - District 18 → District 15

The remaining districts were unchanged.

Changes to the boundaries of Oregon State Senate districts

Partisan makeup following the 1960 election, under old lines
Republican
Democratic
Split delegation

Partisan makeup following the 1962 election, under new lines
Republican
Democratic
Split delegation

Changes to state senate boundaries in 1962
District unchanged
District renumbered
Gained representation
Lost representation

== District 1 ==
Senate District 1 contained all of Marion County and elected two senators.

District 1 election 2 to be elected
Party	Candidate	Votes	%
Republican	Robert L. Elfstrom	23,080	28.94%
Republican	Eddie Ahrens (incumbent)	22,332	28.00%
Democratic	Mary E. Eyre	19,079	23.93%
Democratic	Clifford W. Ferguson	15,245	19.12%
Write-in		8	0.01%
Total votes		79,744	100.00%

== District 2 ==
Senate District 2 contained all of Linn County and elected one senator.

District 2 election 1 to be elected
Party	Candidate	Votes	%
Democratic	Glenn Huston	10,355	55.00%
Republican	Melvin Goode (incumbent)	8,473	45.00%
Total votes		18,828	100.00%

== District 3 ==
Senate District 3 contained all of Lane County and elected three senators.

District 3 election 3 to be elected
Party	Candidate	Votes	%
Democratic	Edward Fadeley	31,696	19.10%
Republican	Donald R. Husband (incumbent)	31,473	18.97%
Democratic	Glenn M. Stadler	30,560	18.42%
Republican	Jo Kittredge	27,061	16.31%
Democratic	Kenneth A. Poole	24,078	14.51%
Republican	Vern Meyer	21,041	12.68%
Write-in		5	0.00%
Total votes		165,914	100.00%

== District 5 ==
Senate District 5 contained all of Jackson County and elected one senator.

District 5 election 1 to be elected
Party	Candidate	Votes	%
Republican	L. W. Newbry (incumbent)	17,549	65.96%
Democratic	Henry F. Padgham Jr.	9,050	34.01%
Write-in		8	0.03%
Total votes		26,607	100.00%

== District 8 ==
Senate District 8 contained all of Washington and Yamhill counties and elected one senator.

District 8 election 1 to be elected
Party	Candidate	Votes	%
Republican	Arthur P. Ireland	25,199	53.11%
Democratic	W. C. Schwenn	22,240	46.88%
Write-in		4	0.01%
Total votes		47,443	100.00%

== District 10 ==
Senate District 10 contained all of Benton and Polk counties and elected one senator.

District 10 election 1 to be elected
Party	Candidate	Votes	%
Republican	Walter Leth	14,200	66.07%
Democratic	Emmet T. Rogers	7,290	33.92%
Write-in		1	0.00%
Total votes		21,491	100.00%

== District 11 ==
Senate District 11 contained all of Clackamas County and elected two senators.

District 11 election 2 to be elected
Party	Candidate	Votes	%
Republican	John J. Inskeep	23,314	26.63%
Democratic	Tom Monaghan	22,304	25.48%
Democratic	Richard E. Groener (incumbent)	22,247	25.41%
Republican	Lee Stidd Jr.	19,658	22.46%
Write-in		15	0.02%
Total votes		87,538	100.00%

== District 12 ==
Senate District 12 contained all of Multnomah County and elected eight senators, five during presidential election years and three during midterm election years. A special election to fill the remaining two years of Jean L. Lewis was also held after he resigned from the Senate to serve as a circuit court judge.

District 12 (4-year term) election 3 to be elected
Party	Candidate	Votes	%
Democratic	Ward H. Cook (incumbent)	121,597	21.89%
Democratic	Ted Hallock	112,611	20.27%
Democratic	Alice Corbett (incumbent)	109,284	19.67%
Republican	Wallace L. Lee	79,449	14.30%
Republican	William E. Richardson	70,136	12.63%
Republican	Jess Webb	62,345	11.22%
Write-in		35	0.01%
Total votes		555,457	100.00%

District 12 (2-year term) election 1 to be elected
Party	Candidate	Votes	%
Democratic	Don S. Willner	107,681	56.33%
Republican	M. M. Meadows	83,483	43.67%
Write-in		5	0.00%
Total votes		191,169	100.00%

== District 14 ==
Senate District 14 contained all of Clatsop and Columbia counties and elected one senator.

District 14 election 1 to be elected
Party	Candidate	Votes	%
Democratic	Daniel A. Thiel (incumbent)	15,852	99.85%
Write-in		24	0.15%
Total votes		15,876	100.00%

== See also ==
- 1962 Oregon House of Representatives election
- 1962 Oregon gubernatorial election
- List of Oregon Legislative Assemblies
