= Journal of the American Association of Nurse Practitioners =

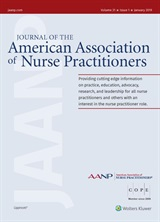
- Discipline: Nursing
- Language: English
- Edited by: Elayne DeSimone

Publication details
- History: 1989–present
- Publisher: Wolters Kluwer on behalf of the American Association of Nurse Practitioners (United States)
- Frequency: Monthly
- Impact factor: 1.136 (2017)

Standard abbreviations
- ISO 4: J. Am. Assoc. Nurse Pract.

Indexing
- ISSN: 2327-6924 (print); 2327-6924 (web)
- OCLC no.: 828097048

Links
- Journal homepage; Online access; Online archive

The Journal of the American Association of Nurse Practitioners is a monthly peer-reviewed nursing journal covering the practice of nurse practitioners. It is the official journal of the American Association of Nurse Practitioners. The journal was established in 1989 as the Journal of the American Academy of Nurse Practitioners, obtaining its current name in 2013.

== Abstracting and indexing ==
The journal is abstracted and indexed by:

- Abstracts in Anthropology
- EBSCO databases
- CINAHL
- Current Contents/Clinical Medicine
- Current Contents/Social & Behavioral Sciences
- MEDLINE
- ProQuest
- PsycINFO/Psychological Abstracts
- PubMed Dietary Supplement Subset
- Science Citation Index Expanded
- Scopus
- Social Sciences Citation Index

According to the Journal Citation Reports, the journal has a 2017 impact factor of 1.136, ranking it 64th out of 115 journals in the category "Nursing", and 81st out of 94 journals in the category "Health Care Sciences & Services".
