= Rachel Prusak =

American politician and nurse practitioner

Member of the Oregon House of Representatives from the 37th district
- In office January 14, 2019 – January 9, 2023
- Preceded by: Julie Parrish
- Succeeded by: Jules Walters

Personal details
- Born: 1975 (age 50–51)
- Party: Democratic
- Education: Northeastern University (BA); Frontier Nursing University (MA)
- Occupation: nurse practitioner

Rachel Prusak (born 1975) is an American Democratic politician and nurse practitioner who served as a member of the Oregon House of Representatives from 2018 to 2023. She represented the 37th district, which includes West Linn, Durham, Rivergrove, Tualatin, and Stafford.

== Professional career ==
Prusak graduated from Northeastern University with a BA in nursing and then earned a master's degree in nursing from Frontier Nursing University. Before her tenure in office, she was a family nurse practitioner who served elderly homebound patients for over 20 years, specializing in palliative and hospice care.

== Political career ==
Prusak defeated incumbent representative Julie Parrish in the 2018 Oregon legislative election.

Upon the failure of SB1566, which would have raised the salary for state representatives. Prusak, along with fellow representatives Karin Power and Anna Williams, announced her intention not to run for re-election. In a joint statement with Power and Williams, they said they "could not afford to work full time for part-time pay."

== Electoral history ==
2018 Oregon State Representative, 37th district
Party	Candidate	Votes	%
Democratic	Rachel Prusak	18,357	52.7
Republican	Julie Parrish	16,434	47.2
Write-in		51	0.1
Total votes		34,842	100%

2020 Oregon State Representative, 37th district
Party	Candidate	Votes	%
Democratic	Rachel Prusak	23,757	57.1
Republican	Kelly Sloop	17,770	42.7
Write-in		44	0.1
Total votes		41,571	100%
