= Ben F. Hurley =

American exercise physiology professor

Bernard F. Hurley, Jr.
- Occupation: Professor of Exercise Physiology

Academic background
- Education: BA., Physical Education; MA., Physical Education; PhD., Exercise Physiology; Postdoctoral fellowship., Exercise Physiology
- Alma mater: University of South Florida; Florida State University; Washington University School of Medicine

Academic work
- Institutions: Washington University School of Medicine; University of Maryland, College Park Department of Kinesiology

Bernard (Ben) F. Hurley, Jr. is an American exercise physiology professor, serving as an emeritus professor in the Department of Kinesiology at the University of Maryland, College Park. His research focuses on the health effects of regular exercise with particular emphasis on the effects of strength training on risk factors for age-related diseases and disability. He has published over 200 research articles, and has an h-index of 74.

Hurley has received many awards for his work, including the University of Maryland Research Leaders Award in 2008, Fellow status in the American College of Sports Medicine in 1983, Fellow status in the American Academy of Kinesiology and Physical Education in 2001, the Keynote Speaker Award at the International Conference of Strength and Conditioning in 1997, the Research and Development Award from the College of Health and Human Performance in 1996, and the University of Maryland Ronald E. McNair Post Baccalaureate Mentor of the Year Award in 1993.

== Education ==
After receiving his bachelor's and master's degrees in 1972 and 1975, respectively, from the University of South Florida, Hurley went on to earn a PhD in Exercise Physiology from Florida State University in 1981 and completed a three-year postdoctoral fellowship at Washington University School of Medicine in 1983 under the mentorship of John Holloszy.

== Career ==
Hurley began his academic career as an assistant professor in the Department of Kinesiology at the University of Maryland, College Park, in 1983, before becoming an associate professor in 1988 and a full professor in 1995. Prior to this, in 1991, he was appointed to the medical staff of the Department of Veterans Affairs Medical Center in Baltimore and worked as a research associate for the Baltimore Longitudinal Study of Aging until 1994. He became an affiliate professor at the Center on Aging until 2010 and maintained affiliations with the Nutrition Graduate Program, the Maryland Fire and Rescue Institute, and the Greenebaum Cancer Center before becoming an emeritus professor at the University of Maryland, College Park.

Hurley is professor emeritus of kinesiology at the University of Maryland, College Park. His research focuses on the effects of aging, diet, and exercise training on risk factors for age-related diseases and disability. His academic affiliations have also included the Department of Epidemiology and Public Health at the University of Maryland School of Medicine, the Program in Oncology at the Marlene and Stewart Greenebaum Cancer Center, the Department of Medicine, the Nutrition Graduate Program, and the Maryland Fire and Rescue Institute.

== Research ==
Hurley's research has focused on the health effects of exercise training with emphasis on the health effects of strength training (ST), specifically as an intervention against risk factors for age-associated diseases, such as hyperlipidemia, insulin resistance, hypertension, osteoporosis, and androgen deprivation therapy used for treating prostate cancer. In a study published in the Journal of the American Medical Association (JAMA), he was the first to find that strength-trained athletes who used anabolic steroids increased their risk for a heart attack by threefold after only 3 weeks of taking these drugs. In a second article published in the same issue of JAMA, his group studied the effects of exercise training on glucose tolerance and HDL cholesterol in older endurance athletes. Hurley's group was the first to explain the paradox for how regular endurance exercise increased the use of fat as an energy source while decreasing its level in the blood and the first to demonstrate that strength training increased the speed of gastrointestinal transit. His group found that the target heart rate cannot be used as a means of determining improved cardiovascular fitness from circuit strength training or aerobic dance. Reviewing the effectiveness of strength training in counteracting muscle decline with age and chronic diseases, he concluded that ST improves muscle function, increases bone mineral density, counteracts sarcopenia, improves muscle function, alleviates symptoms of fibromyalgia and rheumatoid arthritis, reduces risk factors for age-related diseases, and enhances overall health and may have cognitive benefits, though its influence on Alzheimer's disease risk, abdominal obesity, and dyslipidemia, remain unclear, and it does not appear to improve maximal oxygen uptake (VO2max), lipid profiles, or flexibility.

A 2019 review of John O. Holloszy's scientific legacy described work by Hurley in Holloszy's laboratory and later at Maryland as showing that resistance exercise training could lower coronary-disease risk without changing maximal oxygen uptake.

In 1996, The Washington Post described him as the lead researcher for NIH-funded University of Maryland studies comparing younger and older adults' responses to strength training, including work on age, muscle, gait, balance, and bone density.

In 2000, The Washington Post quoted Hurley on the potential relevance of strength training to fall prevention, sarcopenia, diabetes risk, bone mineral density, and maintenance of independence in older adults.

Hurley's later research included studies of resistance training in clinical populations, including Black men receiving androgen deprivation therapy for prostate cancer. His published work also examined genetic and demographic influences on strength-training responses, including studies of age, sex, race, and genotype in relation to muscle hypertrophy, muscle power, regional body composition, blood pressure, glucose and insulin responses, and bone mineral density.

In one study of middle-aged and older adults, Hurley and collaborators found that sex and race did not influence changes in thigh subcutaneous or intermuscular fat after unilateral knee-extension strength training, while both men and women increased quadriceps muscle volume.

His group also studied whole-body strength training across age and sex groups; a 2001 study reported increases in thigh and quadriceps muscle volume among young and older men and women after a six-month program.

His funded research has included studies supported by the National Institute on Aging on aging, strength training, body composition, health status, and genetic influences on responses to strength training.Other research has examined firefighter physical ability, fibromyalgia, osteoarthritis, post-polio syndrome, vitamin D deficiency in homebound older adults, and exercise interventions for patients undergoing prostate cancer treatment.

== Selected articles ==
- Hurley, B. F., Seals, D. R., Ehsani, A. A., Cartier, L. J., Dalsky, G. P., Hagberg, J. M., & Holloszy, J. O. (1984). Effects of high-intensity strength training on cardiovascular function. Medicine and Science in Sports and Exercise, 16(5), 483-488.
- Hurley, B. F., Seals, D. R., Hagberg, J. M., Goldberg, A. C., Ostrove, S. M., Holloszy, J. O., ... & Goldberg, A. P. (1984). High-Density—Lipoprotein Cholesterol in Bodybuilders v Powerlifters: Negative Effects of Androgen Use. JAMA, 252(4), 507-513.
- Seals, D. R., Hagberg, J. M., Hurley, B. F., Ehsani, A. A., & Holloszy, J. O. (1984). Effects of endurance training on glucose tolerance and plasma lipid levels in older men and women. JAMA, 252(5), 645-649.
- Hurley, B. F., Nemeth, P. M., Martin 3rd, W. H., Hagberg, J. M., Dalsky, G. P., & Holloszy, J. O. (1986). Muscle triglyceride utilization during exercise: effect of training. Journal of Applied Physiology, 60(2), 562-567.
- Parker, S. B., Hurley, B. F., Hanlon, D. P., & Vaccaro, P. (1989). Failure of target heart rate to accurately monitor intensity during aerobic dance. Medicine and Science in Sports and Exercise, 21(2), 230-234.
- Koffler, K. H., Menkes, A., Redmond, R. A., Whitehead, W. E., Pratley, R. E., & Hurley, B. F. (1992). Strength training accelerates gastrointestinal transit in middle-aged and older men. Medicine and Science in Sports and Exercise, 24(4), 415-419.
- Hurley, B. F., & Roth, S. M. (2000). Strength training in the elderly: effects on risk factors for age-related diseases. Sports Medicine, 30, 249-268.
- Hanson, E. D.; Sheaff, A. K.; Sood, S.; Ma, L.; Francis, J. D.; Goldberg, A. P.; Hurley, B. F. (2013). Strength training induces muscle hypertrophy and functional gains in Black prostate cancer patients despite androgen deprivation therapy. The Journals of Gerontology: Series A, 68(4), 490-498.
- Hurley, B. F.; Hanson, E. D.; Sheaff, A. K. (2011). Strength training as a countermeasure to aging muscle and chronic disease. Sports Medicine, 41(4), 289-306.
- Walts, C. T.; Hanson, E. D.; Delmonico, M. J.; Yao, L.; Wang, M. Q.; Hurley, B. F. (2008). Do sex or race differences influence strength training effects on muscle or fat? Medicine & Science in Sports & Exercise, 40(4), 669-676.
- Roth, S. M.; Ivey, F. M.; Martel, G. F.; Lemmer, J. T.; Hurlbut, D. E.; Siegel, E. L.; Metter, E. J.; Fleg, J. L.; Fozard, J. L.; Kostek, M. C.; Wernick, D. M.; Hurley, B. F. (2001). Muscle size responses to strength training in young and older men and women. Journal of the American Geriatrics Society, 49(11), 1428-1433.
- Hurley, B. F.; Armstrong, T. J. (2012). Bisphosphonates vs exercise for the prevention and treatment of osteoporosis. Journal for Nurse Practitioners, 8(3), 217-224.
