= Lori Kuechler =

American politician

Member of the Oregon House of Representatives from the 52nd district
- In office September 19, 2022 – January 9, 2023
- Preceded by: Anna Williams
- Succeeded by: Jeff Helfrich

Personal details
- Party: Democratic
- Occupation: Nonprofit consultant Professor

Lori Kuechler is an American politician who served as a member of the Oregon House of Representatives from September 19, 2022, to January 9, 2023. Kuechler was selected by local Democratic officials and appointed by the Multnomah, Clackamas, and Hood River County Commissions to replace Anna Williams, who retired to take a position with the Oregon System of Care Advisory Council.

Kuechler said she had no intention of seeking re-election.

Kuechler is a consultant for nonprofits in Oregon and a professor of Liberal Arts and Interdisciplinary Studies at Southern New Hampshire University. She organized the Sandy Women's March and is an in-house grant writer for the Oregon Historical Society and Morrison Child & Family Services.
