= Jeff Helfrich =

Member of the Oregon House of Representatives

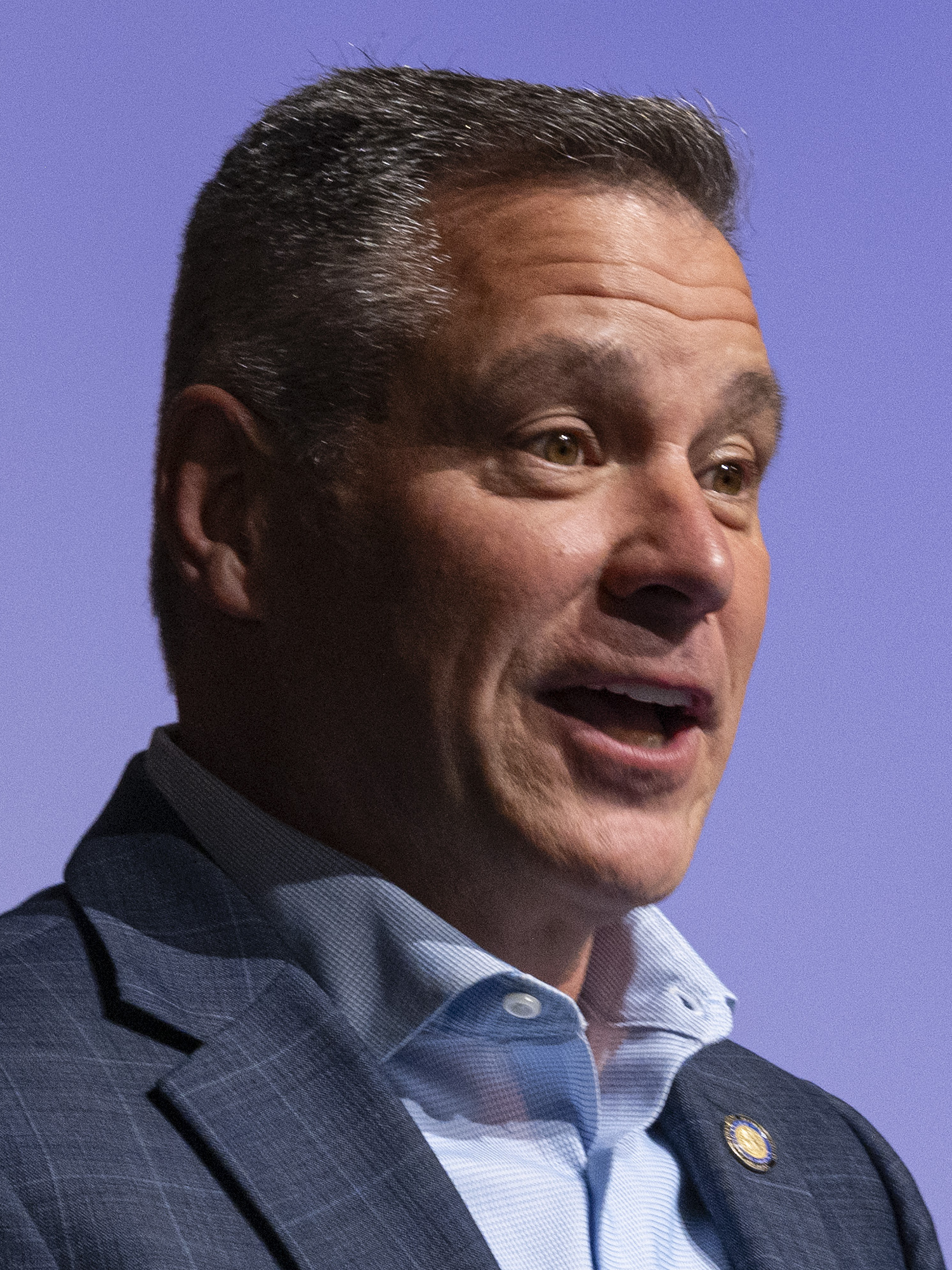

Minority Leader of the Oregon House of Representatives
- In office September 27, 2023 – January 13, 2025
- Preceded by: Vikki Breese-Iverson
- Succeeded by: Christine Drazan

Member of the Oregon House of Representatives from the 52nd district
- Incumbent
- Assumed office January 9, 2023
- Preceded by: Lori Kuechler
- Succeeded by: Hank Sanders (elect)
- In office November 30, 2017 – January 14, 2019
- Preceded by: Mark Johnson
- Succeeded by: Anna Williams

Personal details
- Born: 1968 (age 57–58) Denver, Colorado, U.S.
- Party: Republican
- Spouse: Shawna
- Children: 2
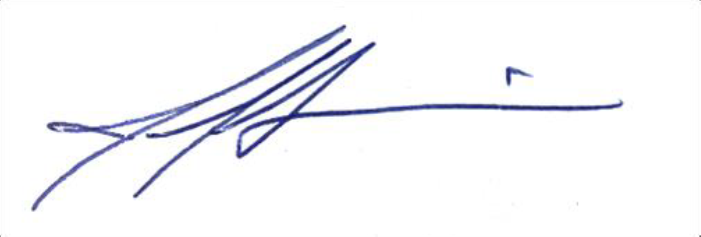
- Signature

Jeffrey Allen Helfrich (born April 1968) is a former airman and policeman serving as a member of the Oregon House of Representatives representing the 52nd district, which covers all of Hood River County and parts of Clackamas, Multnomah and Wasco counties. A Republican, he previously served as Minority Leader of the house from 2023 until 2025.

== Early life ==
Helfrich served as an airman in the United States Air Force during Operation Desert Shield and Operation Desert Storm. He then was a sergeant with the Portland Police Bureau for 25 years.

== Political career ==
Helfrich served on the Cascade Locks City Council from his appointment in 2011 until November 2012. He was again appointed in February 2013 and served until June 2015, when he resigned and moved to Hood River.

On November 6, 2017, incumbent Oregon State Representative Mark Johnson resigned. Helfrich was appointed by a unanimous vote of Clackamas, Hood River, and Multnomah county commissioners to serve the remainder of his term.

Helfrich ran for a full two-year term in 2018, but was defeated by Democrat Anna Williams. In 2020, he lost a rematch with Williams. In 2022, Williams retired and Helrich defeated Darcy Long to reclaim the seat.

In 2023, Helfrich was one of the few legislators to vote no on SB184. This legislation requires that payments made to independent contractors also be reported to the state of Oregon for child support collecting purposes. Prior to the passage of this bill it was near impossible for the state of Oregon to collect child support from independent contractors who refused to support their children.

In September 2023, Helfrich was elected minority leader of the Oregon House of Representatives, replacing Vikki Breese-Iverson who stepped down a week prior.

== Electoral history ==
2018 Oregon State Representative, 52nd district
Party	Candidate	Votes	%
Democratic	Anna Williams	16,135	51.4
Republican	Jeff Helfrich	15,238	48.5
Write-in		41	0.1
Total votes		31,414	100%

2020 Oregon State Representative, 52nd district
Party	Candidate	Votes	%
Democratic	Anna Williams	19,209	48.7
Republican	Jeff Helfrich	19,125	48.5
Libertarian	Stephen D Alder	1,060	2.7
Write-in		26	0.1
Total votes		39,420	100%

2022 Oregon State Representative, 52nd district
Party	Candidate	Votes	%
Republican	Jeff Helfrich	16,994	52.5
Democratic	Darcy Long	15,360	47.4
Write-in		40	0.1
Total votes		32,394	100%

2024 Oregon State Representative, 52nd district
Party	Candidate	Votes	%
Republican	Jeff Helfrich	18,958	51.8
Democratic	Nick Walden Poublon	17,573	48.1
Write-in		40	0.1
Total votes		36,571	100%

Oregon House of Representatives
Preceded by Vikki Breese-Iverson	Minority Leader of the Oregon House of Representatives; 2023–2025	Succeeded by Christine Drazan
