= Jules Walters =

American politician

Member of the Oregon House of Representatives from the 37th district
- Incumbent
- Assumed office January 9, 2023
- Preceded by: Rachel Prusak

Mayor of West Linn, Oregon
- In office January 2021 – December 9, 2022
- Preceded by: Russ Axelrod
- Succeeded by: Rory Bialostosky

Personal details
- Party: Democratic
- Children: 4
- Education: Bachelor's degree
- Alma mater: University of Oregon

Jules Walters is an American Democratic politician serving as a member of the Oregon House of Representatives. She currently represents the 37th district, which covers Tualatin, West Linn, Durham, Rivergrove, parts of Lake Grove, and others.

First elected to the legislature in 2022, Walters previously served as Mayor of West Linn from 2020 until she resigned from the post on December 9, 2022, and before that, she served as a member of the West Linn City Council.

== Committees ==
Walters is currently serving as Co-Vice Chair of the Committee On Revenue. She is also a member of the Committee On Economic Development and Small Business, and the Joint Committee On Ways and Means Subcommittee On General Government

== Electoral history ==
2022 Oregon State Representative, 37th district
Party	Candidate	Votes	%
Democratic	Jules Walters	20,588	59.2
Republican	Aeric Estep	14,177	40.7
Write-in		39	0.1
Total votes		34,804	100%

2024 Oregon State Representative, 37th district
Party	Candidate	Votes	%
Democratic	Jules Walters	23,356	61.3
Republican	Ben Edtl	14,703	38.6
Write-in		65	0.2
Total votes		38,124	100%
