= Kathleen Taylor (politician) =

Politician

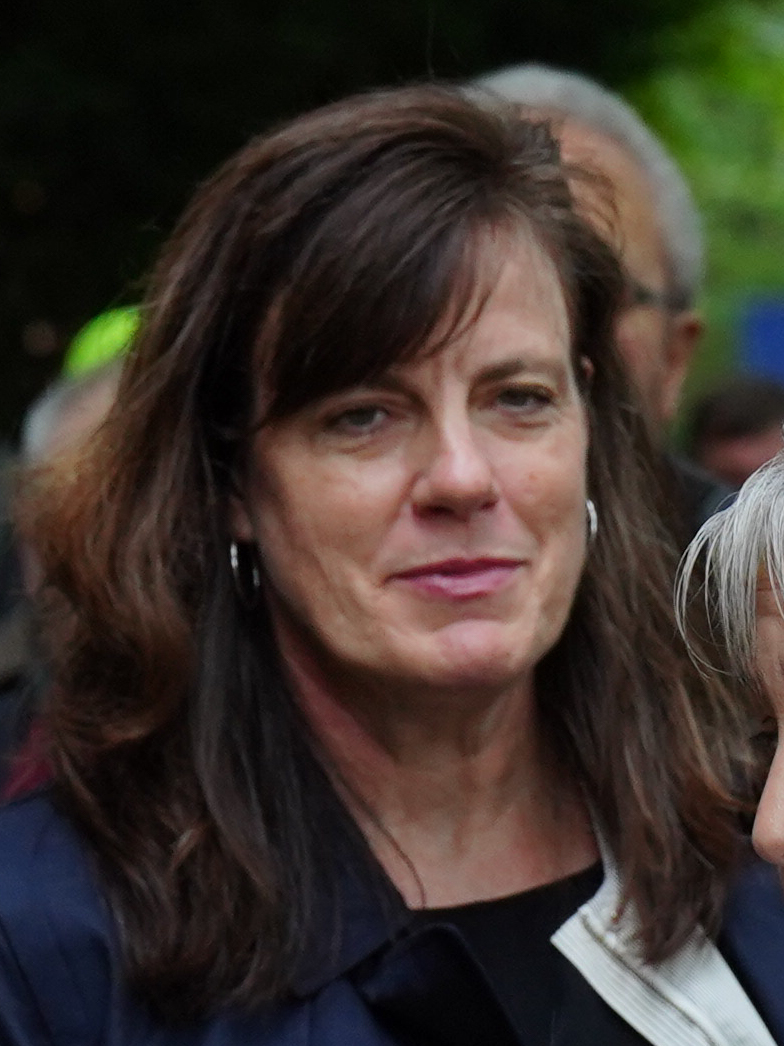

Member of the Oregon Senate from the 21st district
- Incumbent
- Assumed office January 9, 2017
- Preceded by: Diane Rosenbaum

Majority Leader of the Oregon Senate
- In office July 15, 2024 – November 16, 2024
- Preceded by: Kate Lieber
- Succeeded by: Kayse Jama

Member of the Oregon House of Representatives from the 41st district
- In office January 2015 – January 9, 2017
- Preceded by: Carolyn Tomei
- Succeeded by: Karin Power

Personal details
- Born: 1966 or 1967 (age 59–60)
- Party: Democratic
- Education: University of Wisconsin, Madison (BA); Rutgers University, New Brunswick (MPP)

Kathleen Taylor (born 1966/1967) is an American politician currently serving in the Oregon State Senate. A Democrat, she was first elected to the Oregon House of Representatives in 2014 and to the Oregon State Senate in 2016. She represents Senate district 21, which covers part of southeast Portland and its suburbs, including Milwaukie. She lives in Portland.

== Professional experience ==
Taylor is an auditor by trade. She has worked as an auditor for the city of Portland, Multnomah County, and the state of Oregon. She holds a master's degree in public policy from Rutgers University in New Jersey.

== Political career ==
Taylor was first elected after defeating former Milwaukie city councilor Deborah Barnes in the Democratic primary election on May 20, 2014. She was endorsed by outgoing Representative Carolyn Tomei and Oregon Governor John Kitzhaber in her race against Barnes.

Taylor was elected Senate Majority Leader in a Democratic caucus meeting on June 17, 2024 and served as leader from July 15 to November 16.

== Electoral history ==
2014 Oregon State Representative, 41st district
Party	Candidate	Votes	%
Democratic	Kathleen Taylor	18,845	70.5
Republican	Timothy E McMenamin	7,774	29.1
Write-in		117	0.4
Total votes		26,736	100%

2016 Oregon State Senator, 21st district
Party	Candidate	Votes	%
Democratic	Kathleen Taylor	54,520	76.7
Progressive	James Ofsink	10,390	14.6
Libertarian	Josh Howard	5,852	8.2
Write-in		322	0.5
Total votes		71,084	100%

2020 Oregon State Senator, 21st district
Party	Candidate	Votes	%
Democratic	Kathleen Taylor	71,543	97.6
Write-in		1,769	2.4
Total votes		73,312	100%

2024 Oregon State Senator, 21st district
Party	Candidate	Votes	%
Democratic	Kathleen Taylor	58,422	98.0
Write-in		1,174	2.0
Total votes		59,596	100%

Oregon Senate
Preceded by Kate Lieber	Majority Leader of the Oregon Senate; 2024	Succeeded by Kayse Jama
