= Oregon's 52nd House district =

Legislative districts in the state of Oregon

Oregon's 52nd House district after redistricting after the 2020 Census

District 52 of the Oregon House of Representatives is one of 60 House legislative districts in the state of Oregon. As of 2021, the boundary for the district contains all of Hood River County and portions of Clackamas, Multnomah, and Wasco counties. The district includes the population centers of Hood River and The Dalles as well as Mt. Hood. The current representative for the district is Republican Jeff Helfrich of Hood River. This is Helfrich's second stint representing this district in the state legislature after being appointed to the office in 2017 but losing re-election.

== Election results ==
District boundaries have changed over time. Therefore, representatives before 2021 may not represent the same constituency as today. General election results from 1990 to present are as follows:

Year	Candidate	Party	Percent	Opponent	Party	Percent	Write-in percentage
1990	Jerry Barnes	Republican	50.53%	Nancy E. Petersen	Democratic	49.45%	
1992	Nancy E. Petersen	Democratic	50.28%	Jerry Barnes	Republican	49.70%	
1994	Judy Uherbelau	Democratic	50.12%	Jerry Barnes	Republican	49.88%	
1996	Judy Uherbelau	Democratic	54.81%	Jerry Barnes	Republican	45.19%	
1998	Judy Uherbelau	Democratic	56.12%	Jane Hunts	Republican	43.88%	
2000	Alan Bates	Democratic	60.29%	Jane Hunts	Republican	39.71%	
2002 (Note: Patti Smith was the incumbent in this election. She previously represented District 56, but was moved to this district due to redistricting following the 2000 United States census.)	Patti Smith	Republican	64.21%	Larry Cramblett	Democratic	35.62%	0.17%
2004	Patti Smith	Republican	57.57%	Wayne Kuechler	Democratic	42.43%	
2006	Patti Smith	Republican	55.70%	Suzanne VanOrman	Democratic	44.15%	0.15%
2008	Suzanne Van Orman	Democratic	52.06%	Matt Lindland	Republican	47.66%	0.28%
2010	Mark Johnson	Republican	56.52%	Suzanne VanOrman	Democratic	43.30%	0.18%
2012	Mark Johnson	Republican	51.60%	Peter Nordbye	Democratic	48.22%	0.18%
2014	Mark Johnson	Republican	54.39%	Stephanie Nystrom	Democratic	45.30%	0.30%
2016	Mark Johnson	Republican	55.48%	Mark Reynolds	Democratic	44.33%	0.19%
2018 (Note: Jeff Helfrich was the incumbent in this election. He was appointed to this seat on November 29, 2017 to replace Mark Johnson, who resigned from office when he was appointed President and CEO of Oregon Business and Industry.)	Anna Williams	Democratic	51.36%	Jeff Helfrich	Republican	48.51%	0.13%
2020	Anna Williams	Democratic	48.73%	Jeff Helfrich	Republican	48.52%	0.06%
2022	Jeff Helfrich	Republican	52.46%	Darcy Long	Democratic	47.42%	0.12%
2024	Jeff Helfrich	Republican	51.8%	Nick Walden Poublon	Democratic	48.1%	0.1%

== See also ==
- Oregon Legislative Assembly
- Oregon House of Representatives
