= American Association of Nurse Practitioners =

Professional organization

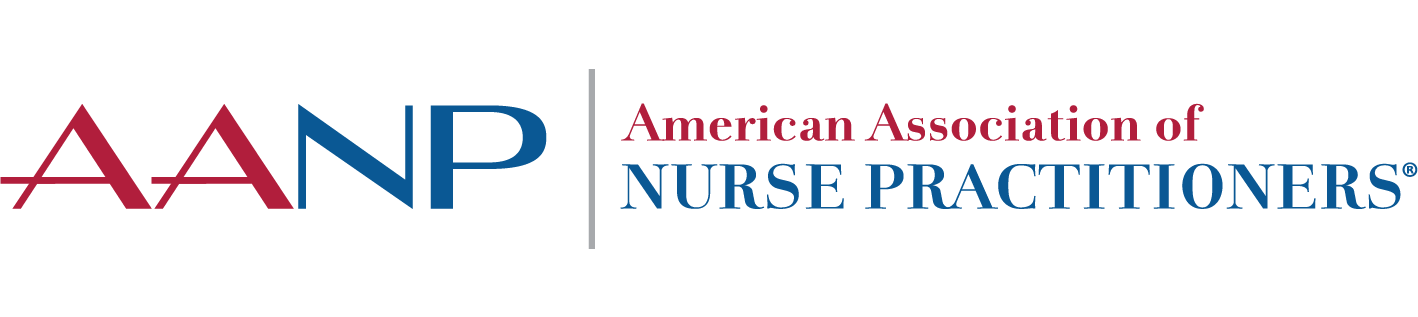
- Abbreviation: AANP
- Formation: January 1, 2013
- Type: Professional organization
- Tax ID no.: 22-2547543
- Legal status: 501(c)(6)
- Purpose: Membership, Educational, Advocacy
- Headquarters: Austin, Texas
- Region served: United States
- Members: 120,000
- President: Stephen Ferrara
- Immediate Past President: April Kapu
- CEO: Jon Fanning
- Website: www.aanp.org

The American Association of Nurse Practitioners (AANP) is a North American professional association formed in 2013 as a result of a merger between the American Academy of Nurse Practitioners (founded in 1985) and the American College of Nurse Practitioners (founded in 1995) to provide nurse practitioners with a unified way to network and advocate their issues. The American Academy of Nurse Practitioners was the first organization created for nurse practitioners of all specialties in the United States of America, and AANP remains the largest national membership organization for nurse practitioners in the United States. AANP seeks to represent the interests of the more than 355,000 nurse practitioners licensed to practice in the U.S. and continually advocates at local, state and federal levels for the recognition of nurse practitioners as providers of high-quality, cost-effective and personalized health care.

The association has two official journals: the Journal of the American Association of Nurse Practitioners and The Journal for Nurse Practitioners.

== Notable events ==
- 2013 – The American College of Nurse Practitioners and American Academy of Nurse Practitioners merge to form the American Association of Nurse Practitioners.
- 2019 – AANP surpassed the 100,000 member mark.
- 2020 – AANP responds to WGN's coverage of a book opposing full practice authority for nurse practitioners, claiming that the story propagated negative "conspiracy theories and misstatements".

== American Academy of Nurse Practitioners Certification Board ==
In 1993, the American Academy of Nurse Practitioners established the American Academy of Nurse Practitioners Certification Program, which became separately incorporated in 1999 as the American Academy of Nurse Practitioners National Certification Board. In 2017, it was renamed the American Academy of Nurse Practitioners Certification Board (AANPCB). The AANPCB is one of the two primary certifying bodies for nurse practitioners in the United States, alongside the American Nurses Credentialing Center (ANCC). The AANPCB administers competency-based examinations to verify clinical knowledge and ensures that candidates meet continuing education and practice requirements to maintain national certification within their specialty.
