= Mark Johnson (Oregon politician) =

American politician

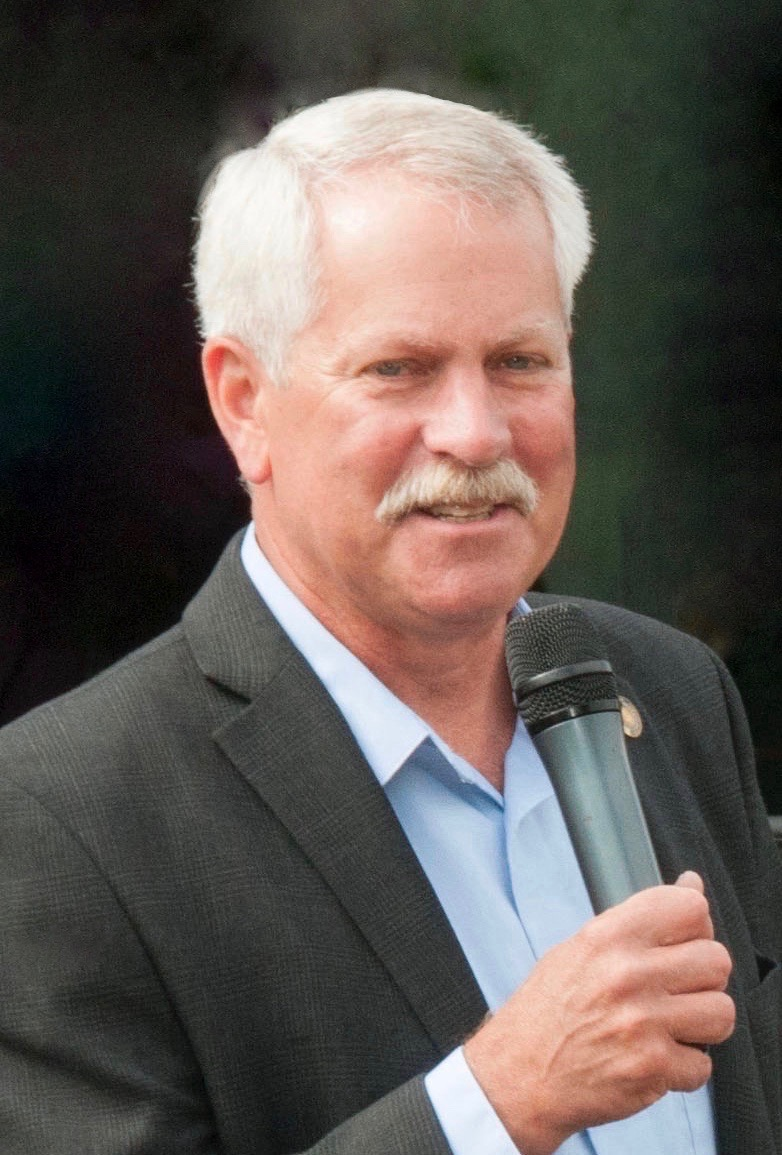

Member of the Oregon House of Representatives from the 52nd district
- In office January 10, 2011 – November 6, 2017
- Preceded by: Suzanne VanOrman
- Succeeded by: Jeff Helfrich

Personal details
- Born: 1957 (age 68–69) Parkdale, Oregon
- Party: Republican
- Education: Whitworth College
- Website: repmarkjohnson.com
- Mark Johnson's voice Johnson speaking about the 77th Oregon Legislative Assembly; Recorded July 31, 2013

Mark Johnson (born in 1957 in Parkdale, Oregon) is an American politician and a Republican former member of the Oregon House of Representatives, representing District 52 from 2011 until 2017.

== Education ==
Johnson attended Whitworth College (now Whitworth University).

== Resignation ==
On October 6, 2017, Johnson was named executive director of Oregon Business Industry, a business lobbying organization, and resigned his seat November 6, 2017.

== Fired From Oregon Business and Industry ==
On April 11, 2018, Johnson was fired from Oregon Business and Industry because he made racist comments about a State Representative. He made comments denigrating Rep. Diego Hernandez "and his chain migration homeboys from the hood." According to an article in the Oregonian/Oregonlive Johnson's tenure was "plagued by turnover of senior staff, frayed relationships internally and externally, questions surrounding his executive and managerial skills, and the lack of a coherent strategy for members."

== Elections ==
- 2012 Johnson was unopposed for the May 15, 2012 Republican Primary, winning with 3,646 votes, and won the November 6, 2012 General election with 14,344 votes (51.6%) against Democratic nominee Peter Nordbye.
- 2010 Challenging incumbent Democratic Representative Suzanne VanOrman for the District 52 seat, Johnson was unopposed for the May 18, 2010 Republican Primary, winning with 3,643 votes, and won the November 2, 2010 General election with 14,012 votes (56.5%) against Representative VanOrman.

== Electoral history ==
2010 Oregon State Representative, 52nd district
Party	Candidate	Votes	%
Republican	Mark Johnson	14,012	56.5
Democratic	Suzanne VanOrman	10,739	43.3
Write-in		45	0.2
Total votes		24,796	100%

2012 Oregon State Representative, 52nd district
Party	Candidate	Votes	%
Republican	Mark Johnson	14,344	51.6
Democratic	Peter Nordbye	13,407	48.2
Write-in		50	0.2
Total votes		27,801	100%

2014 Oregon State Representative, 52nd district
Party	Candidate	Votes	%
Republican	Mark Johnson	13,014	54.4
Democratic	Stephanie Nystrom	10,839	45.3
Write-in		72	0.3
Total votes		23,925	100%

2016 Oregon State Representative, 52nd district
Party	Candidate	Votes	%
Republican	Mark Johnson	17,582	55.5
Democratic	Mark Reynolds	14,047	44.3
Write-in		59	0.2
Total votes		31,688	100%
