= Karin Power =

American politician (born 1982/83)

The Honorable Karin Power

Member of the Oregon House of Representatives from the 41st district
- In office January 9, 2017 – January 9, 2023
- Preceded by: Kathleen Taylor
- Succeeded by: Mark Gamba

Member of the Milwaukie City Council, Position 4
- In office January 1, 2015 – January 8, 2017
- Preceded by: Mike Miller
- Succeeded by: Shane Abma

Personal details
- Born: 1982 or 1983 (age 43–44)
- Party: Democratic
- Children: 2
- Education: Lewis & Clark Law School

Karin Power (born 1982/83) is an American lawyer and Democratic politician who previously served in the Oregon House of Representatives. She represented the 41st district, which covers parts of Clackamas County and Multnomah County, including Milwaukie, Oak Grove, and parts of southeast Portland.

== Early life and education ==
Power moved to Southeast Portland from Boston, Massachusetts in 2009 in order to attend Lewis & Clark Law School. She later moved to Milwaukie in October 2012, and was elected to the City Council in 2014.

== Political career ==
She won election to the House in 2016, defeating Republican candidate Timothy E. McMenamin with 71% of the vote.

In 2018 she ran unopposed, receiving 97.1% of the vote, however turnout in this election was lower than previous elections.

In 2020, she won the Democratic Primary unopposed with 99.32% of the vote (12,928). 88 individuals wrote in other names. In November 2020, she defeated Republican challenger and combat veteran Michael Newgard.

In February 2022, Power announced (along with fellow state Representatives Rachel Prusak and Anna Williams) that she would not seek reelection at the end of her current term ending in January 2023.

Power was succeeded by former Milwaukie mayor Mark Gamba.

In 2025, Governor Tina Kotek appointed Power to be a member of the Oregon Public Utility Commission. The appointment was approved by the Oregon State Senate.

== Personal life ==
Power lives in Milwaukie with her two sons.

== Electoral history ==
2016 Oregon State Representative, 41st district
Party	Candidate	Votes	%
Democratic	Karin Power	24,589	71.3
Republican	Tim McMenamin	9,799	28.4
Write-in		76	0.2
Total votes		34,464	100%

2018 Oregon State Representative, 41st district
Party	Candidate	Votes	%
Democratic	Karin Power	23,638	97.1
Write-in		696	2.9
Total votes		24,334	100%

2020 Oregon State Representative, 41st district
Party	Candidate	Votes	%
Democratic	Karin Power	30,725	73.7
Republican	Michael Newgard	10,878	26.1
Write-in		62	0.1
Total votes		41,665	100%
