= Patti Smith (politician) =

American politician

Member of the Oregon House of Representatives from the 52nd district
- In office January 2001 – January 12, 2009
- Succeeded by: Suzanne VanOrman

Personal details
- Born: Patricia Edyth Graff; October 29, 1946 Portland, Oregon
- Died: April 14, 2017 (aged 70) Corbett, Oregon
- Party: Republican
- Spouse: Leroy Smith
- Children: 5
- Education: Mount Hood Community College

Patricia Edyth Smith (née Graff; October 29, 1946 – April 14, 2017) was an American Republican politician who served in the Oregon House of Representatives from 2001 until 2009.

Smith was born to Albert and Beatrice Graff in Portland, Oregon. In 1964, she graduated from Corbett High School and later attended Mount Hood Community College.

Smith and her husband, Leroy, married on July 26, 1980. She had two children: Chad and Shannon, and three stepchildren: Melanie, Jeffrey and Valerie.

== Electoral history ==
2004 Oregon State Representative, 52nd district
Party	Candidate	Votes	%
Republican	Patti Smith	17,075	57.4
Democratic	Wayne Kuechler	12,583	42.3
Write-in		68	0.2
Total votes		29,726	100%

2006 Oregon State Representative, 52nd district
Party	Candidate	Votes	%
Republican	Patti Smith	12,588	55.7
Democratic	Suzanne VanOrman	9,994	44.2
Write-in		34	0.2
Total votes		22,616	100%
