= Mark Gamba =

American politician

Member of the Oregon House of Representatives from the 41st district
- Incumbent
- Assumed office January 9, 2023
- Preceded by: Karin Power

Mayor of Milwaukie, Oregon
- In office 2015–2023
- Preceded by: Wilda Parks
- Succeeded by: Lisa Batey

Member of the Milwaukie City Council for Position 3
- In office 2013–2015
- Preceded by: Joe Loomis
- Succeeded by: Wilda Parks

Personal details
- Born: Mark Francis Gamba Fort Collins, Colorado, U.S.
- Party: Democratic
- Education: Colorado Mountain College, (AAS)
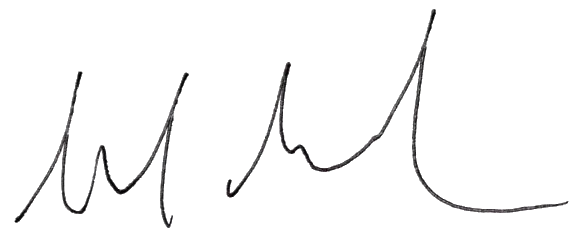
- Signature

Mark Francis Gamba is an American politician in the U.S. state of Oregon who currently serves in the Oregon House of Representatives representing the 41st district in Milwaukie. Previously, Gamba served as mayor of Milwaukie.

== Early life ==
Gamba was born and raised in Colorado.

Gamba attended Glenwood Springs High School in Glenwood Springs, Colorado. He graduated in 1977

== Career ==
Although he has lived in Oregon for over two decades, Gamba has worked all over the world as a photographer with many assignments from National Geographic. He has also worked as a land surveyor.

Gamba was a member of the Milwaukie Planning Commission and served as Vice Chair of the Subcommittee on Energy and Environment of the League of Oregon Cities.

In 2012, Gamba was elected to the Milwaukie City Council, defeating attorney Scott N Barbur.

=== Mayor ===
Gamba was elected Mayor of Milwaukie, running unopposed, in a 2015 special election to replace Jeremy Ferguson, who resigned to take a private sector job.

As Mayor, Gamba helped to create the city's Climate Action Plan and also created a resolution declaring a climate emergency. Milwaukie was one of the first cities in Oregon to do both.

=== Congressional Campaign ===
In 2020, Gamba announced his intent to run for the Democratic nomination for United States House of Representatives in Oregon's 5th congressional district. Gamba was attempting to unseat long-term incumbent Kurt Schrader. Gamba, a progressive, noted his concerns with Schrader's moderate and sometimes conservative stances on various issues, namely his support for gun rights, "A-" rating from the NRA Political Victory Fund, and opposition to the Green New Deal and Medicare for All Act.

Gamba lost to Schrader in the primary. Schrader was defeated in the primary in the next election by progressive Jamie McLeod-Skinner, who lost to Republican Lori Chavez-DeRemer in the general election.

=== State representative ===
In 2022, Gamba announced his intention to run for the Oregon House of Representatives in District 41 after incumbent Karin Power decided to resign to focus on her main job. Gamba ran against nonprofit executive Kaliko Castille and former transit operator Christopher Draus in the primary, easily defeating them both. In the general election, Gamba defeated Milwaukie Public Safety Committee member Rob Reynolds.

== Controversy ==
Speaking in support of a bill that would rise taxes to build infrastructure in Oregon, Gamba described people critical of the plan as "petulant children", and received criticism for his remarks.

== Electoral history ==
2022 Oregon State Representative, 41st district
| Party | Candidate | Votes | % |
|---|---|---|---|
| Democratic | Mark Gamba | 29,187 | 78.2 |
| Republican | Rob Reynolds | 8,088 | 21.7 |
| Write-in | | 45 | 0.1 |
| Total votes | | 37,320 | 100% |

2024 Oregon State Representative, 41st district
| Party | Candidate | Votes | % |
|---|---|---|---|
| Democratic | Mark F Gamba | 32,386 | 79.9 |
| Republican | Elvis Clark | 8,101 | 20.0 |
| Write-in | | 64 | 0.2 |
| Total votes | | 40,551 | 100% |
