= 1962 Oregon House of Representatives election =

- November 6, 1962

All 60 seats in the Oregon House of Representatives 31 seats needed for a majority

	Majority party	Minority party
Leader	Robert B. Duncan (retired)	F. F. Montgomery
Party	Democratic	Republican
Leader's seat	19th district	5th district
Seats won	31	29
Popular vote	977,577	921,979
Percentage	51.46%	48.53%
- Results by party Democratic win Republican win
Speaker before election
Robert B. Duncan
Democratic
Elected Speaker
Clarence Barton
Democratic

Elections to the Oregon House of Representatives were held on November 6, 1962, to elect 60 candidates to the House to serve two-year terms. The Democratic Party won 31 seats to the Republicans' 29, with no net gains for either side.

Following the 1960 U.S. Census, the state was divided up into 28 representative districts based on county lines, electing between one and seventeen representatives. Multnomah County, home to the state's largest city, Portland, was split up into five subdistricts which elected sixteen representatives, with the last representative being elected by the county at-large. Five single-county districts were embedded within larger multi-county districts.

Following the election, Clarence Barton of Coos County was elected speaker on January 14, 1963.

== District 1 ==
House District 1 contained all of Clatsop County and elected one representative.

District 1 election 1 to be elected
Party	Candidate	Votes	%
Democratic	W. H. Holstrom	9,066	99.78%
Write-in		20	0.22%
Total votes		9,086	100.00%

== District 2 ==
House District 2 contained all of Columbia County and elected one representative.

District 2 election 1 to be elected
Party	Candidate	Votes	%
Democratic	Wayne Turner	5,695	69.32%
Republican	Lawrence Meissner	2,519	30.66%
Write-in		2	0.02%
Total votes		8,216	100.00%

== District 3 ==
House District 3 contained all of Tillamook County and elected one representative.

District 3 election 1 to be elected
Party	Candidate	Votes	%
Democratic	Edward F. Ridderbusch	3,398	50.91%
Republican	Harry C. Elliott	3,277	49.09%
Total votes		6,675	100.00%

== District 4 ==
House District 4 contained all of Washington County and elected three representatives.

District 4 election 3 to be elected
Party	Candidate	Votes	%
Republican	Victor Atiyeh	21,894	21.55%
Republican	Robert E. Jones	20,834	20.50%
Republican	John D. Mosser	18,750	18.45%
Democratic	G. Johnny Parks	13,979	13.76%
Democratic	Eva M. Bmower	13,199	12.99%
Democratic	G. W. Kurtz	12,945	12.74%
Write-in		5	0.00%
Total votes		101,606	100.00%

== District 5 ==
House District 5 contained all of Yamhill County and elected one representative.

District 5 election 1 to be elected
Party	Candidate	Votes	%
Republican	Merrill C. Hagan	6,160	52.70%
Democratic	Russell S. Lehman	5,526	47.28%
Write-in		2	0.02%
Total votes		11,688	100.00%

== District 6 ==
Legislative Districts of Multomah County, 1962

House District 6 contained all of Multnomah County and elected seventeen representatives. The county was split into five subdistricts containing between three or four members, and elected an additional representative at-large.

District 6 West subdistrict election 3 to be elected
Party	Candidate	Votes	%
Republican	Shirley Field	20,859	21.63%
Republican	Ken Maher	19,077	19.78%
Republican	E. G. Chutnard	18,692	19.38%
Democratic	Hollis C. Ransom Jr.	14,153	14.68%
Democratic	Richard W. Boetger	12,945	13.42%
Democratic	Nora Hitchman Seaborn	10,701	11.10%
Write-in		7	0.01%
Total votes		96,434	100.00%

District 6 South City subdistrict election 3 to be elected
Party	Candidate	Votes	%
Democratic	Grace Olivier Peck	21,892	20.93%
Democratic	Norman R. Howard	21,705	20.75%
Democratic	Philip D. Lang	21,276	20.34%
Republican	Dan Mosee	14,893	14.24%
Republican	Frederick S. Wilhelm	13,232	12.65%
Republican	Robert H. McMullen	11,590	11.08%
Write-in		17	0.02%
Total votes		104,605	100.00%

District 6 East Central City subdistrict election 4 to be elected
Party	Candidate	Votes	%
Republican	Robert W. Packwood	26,361	14.40%
Republican	William J. Gallagher	25,765	14.07%
Republican	Fred Meek	25,103	13.71%
Republican	Bob Chappel	24,485	13.37%
Democratic	Betty Beach	22,878	12.50%
Democratic	Dan J. Fraser	20,987	11.46%
Democratic	Robert V. Crosier	19,538	10.67%
Democratic	Harold P. Steubs	17,932	9.80%
Write-in		22	0.01%
Total votes		183,071	100.00%

District 6 North City subdistrict election 3 to be elected
Party	Candidate	Votes	%
Democratic	Ed Whelan	20,454	24.02%
Democratic	Ray Dooley	18,581	21.82%
Democratic	J. E. Bennett	17,827	20.94%
Republican	Verne A. Davis	9,955	11.69%
Republican	Doug Gray	9,879	11.60%
Republican	James A. LeRoy	8,410	9.88%
Write-in		35	0.04%
Total votes		85,141	100.00%

District 6 East County subdistrict election 3 to be elected
Party	Candidate	Votes	%
Democratic	Ross Morgan	25,967	21.96%
Democratic	John McBain	24,914	21.07%
Democratic	Howard Willits	24,076	20.36%
Republican	George C. Rider	16,135	13.64%
Republican	Joe St. Martin	14,675	12.41%
Republican	Jess C. Vest	12,489	10.56%
Write-in		4	0.00%
Total votes		118,260	100.00%

District 6 At-large election 1 to be elected
Party	Candidate	Votes	%
Democratic	Berkeley Lent	105,120	56.96%
Republican	George B. Malarkey	79,429	43.04%
Total votes		184,549	100.00%

== District 7 ==
House District 7 contained all of Clackamas County and elected four representatives.

District 7 election 4 to be elected
Party	Candidate	Votes	%
Democratic	Buelah J. Hand	25,919	15.11%
Democratic	Juanita Orr	23,868	13.91%
Republican	Robert P. Dickinson	22,163	12.92%
Democratic	Elmer McClure	21,300	12.42%
Republican	Roger E. Martin	20,879	12.17%
Republican	George J. Eivers	20,423	11.90%
Democratic	Michael P. McKernan	19,553	11.40%
Republican	Arthur K. Guild	17,441	10.17%
Write-in		7	0.00%
Total votes		171,553	100.00%

== District 8 ==
House District 8 contained all of Lincoln County and elected one representative.

District 8 election 1 to be elected
Party	Candidate	Votes	%
Republican	W. S. Duderkirk	4,562	53.54%
Democratic	Thomas R. McClellan	3,958	46.46%
Total votes		8,520	100.00%

== District 9 ==
House District 9 contained all of Polk County and elected one representative.

District 9 election 1 to be elected
Party	Candidate	Votes	%
Republican	Joe Rogers	6,314	65.55%
Democratic	Leslie V. Bahr	3,319	34.45%
Total votes		9,633	100.00%

== District 10 ==
House District 10 contained all of Benton County and elected one representative.

District 10 election 1 to be elected
Party	Candidate	Votes	%
Republican	C. R. Hoyt	8,443	69.61%
Democratic	Emery L. Clark	3,686	30.39%
Total votes		12,129	100.00%

== District 11 ==
House District 11 contained all of Marion County and elected four representatives.

District 11 election 4 to be elected
Party	Candidate	Votes	%
Democratic	Cornelius C. Bateson	23,067	14.76%
Republican	Morris K. Crothers	22,928	14.68%
Republican	Russell F. Bonesteele	21,074	13.49%
Republican	Winton J. Hunt	20,331	13.01%
Republican	Floyd Utter	18,096	11.58%
Democratic	Richard F. May	17,377	11.12%
Democratic	L. B. Day	16,747	10.72%
Democratic	Tom Wright	16,598	10.62%
Write-in		17	0.01%
Total votes		156,235	100.00%

== District 12 ==
House District 12 contained all of Linn County and elected two representatives.

District 12 election 2 to be elected
Party	Candidate	Votes	%
Democratic	Nancy Kirkpatrick	10,766	30.98%
Republican	Gerald W. Detering	8,421	24.23%
Republican	Willian F. Gwinn	8,282	23.83%
Democratic	Ross McCormick	7,279	20.95%
Total votes		34,748	100.00%

== District 13 ==
House District 13 contained all of Lane County and elected five representatives.

District 13 election 5 to be elected
Party	Candidate	Votes	%
Republican	F. F. Montgomery	34,691	12.82%
Democratic	Richard Eyemann	32,117	11.87%
Democratic	Richard L. Kennedy	30,606	11.31%
Republican	Edward W. Elder	29,804	11.02%
Democratic	Veola Peterson Wilmot	27,350	10.11%
Republican	M. F. Moyer	25,434	9.40%
Republican	Don Wilson	24,443	9.03%
Democratic	Glenn Hammaker	23,156	8.56%
Democratic	J. Michael McCloskey	22,555	8.34%
Republican	Robert Adair Jr.	20,389	7.54%
Write-in		22	0.01%
Total votes		270,567	100.00%

== District 14 ==
House District 14 contained all of Benton and Lane counties and elected one representative. Districts 10 and 13 were embedded within it; these two counties and three districts combined elected seven representatives.

District 14 election 1 to be elected
Party	Candidate	Votes	%
Democratic	Eugene G. Hulett	35,312	52.80%
Republican	A. L. Hawn	31,571	47.20%
Write-in		1	0.00%
Total votes		66,884	100.00%

== District 15 ==
House District 15 contained all of Douglas County and elected two representatives.

District 15 election 2 to be elected
Party	Candidate	Votes	%
Democratic	Sidney Leiken	9,420	25.44%
Democratic	W. D. Kelsay	9,404	25.40%
Republican	Dudley C. Walton	9,115	24.62%
Republican	Peter B. Serafin	9,087	24.54%
Total votes		37,026	100.00%

== District 16 ==
House District 16 contained all of Coos County and elected one representative.

District 16 election 1 to be elected
Party	Candidate	Votes	%
Democratic	Clarence Barton	14,878	100.00%
Total votes		14,878	100.00%

== District 17 ==
House District 17 contained all of Coos and Curry counties and elected one representative. District 16 was embedded within it; these two counties and districts combined elected two representatives.

District 17 election 1 to be elected
Party	Candidate	Votes	%
Democratic	Carl Beck	14,456	69.90%
Republican	Edward F. Ackley	6,197	29.97%
Write-in		27	0.13%
Total votes		20,680	100.00%

== District 18 ==
House District 18 contained all of Josephine County and elected one representative.

District 18 election 1 to be elected
Party	Candidate	Votes	%
Republican	Sid Bazett	7,758	72.10%
Democratic	Carroll W. Dewey	3,001	27.89%
Write-in		1	0.01%
Total votes		10,760	100.00%

== District 19 ==
House District 19 contained all of Jackson County and elected three representatives.

District 19 election 3 to be elected
Party	Candidate	Votes	%
Republican	John R. Dellenback	16,778	22.02%
Republican	Edward Branchfield	14,328	18.81%
Democratic	James A. Redden	12,231	16.05%
Republican	Alexander A. Dumas	12,010	15.76%
Democratic	Alva N. Bradford	11,870	15.58%
Democratic	Charles W. Crary	8,968	11.77%
Write-in		2	0.00%
Total votes		76,187	100.00%

== District 20 ==
House District 20 contained all of Klamath County and elected one representative.

District 20 election 1 to be elected
Party	Candidate	Votes	%
Republican	Carroll B. Howe	8,543	63.24%
Democratic	Walter H. Turner	4,965	36.76%
Total votes		13,508	100.00%

== District 21 ==
House District 21 contained all of Crook, Deschutes, and Jefferson counties and elected one representative.

District 21 election 1 to be elected
Party	Candidate	Votes	%
Republican	Kessler Richard Cannon	6,583	51.10%
Democratic	Ben Evick	6,299	48.90%
Total votes		12,882	100.00%

== District 22 ==
House District 22 contained all of Hood River and Wasco counties and elected one representative.

District 22 election 1 to be elected
Party	Candidate	Votes	%
Democratic	Katherine Musa	6,787	59.16%
Republican	Wilson Appelgren	4,686	40.84%
Total votes		11,473	100.00%

== District 23 ==
House District 23 contained all of Umatilla County and elected one representative.

District 23 election 1 to be elected
Party	Candidate	Votes	%
Republican	Stafford Hansell	11,021	99.85%
Write-in		17	0.15%
Total votes		11,038	100.00%

== District 24 ==
House District 24 contained all of Union and Wallowa counties and elected one representative.

District 24 election 1 to be elected
Party	Candidate	Votes	%
Democratic	Don McKinnis	6,970	99.96%
Write-in		3	0.04%
Total votes		6,973	100.00%

== District 25 ==
House District 25 contained all of Baker and Grant counties and elected one representative.

District 25 election 1 to be elected
Party	Candidate	Votes	%
Democratic	Clinton P. Haight	6,235	99.71%
Write-in		18	0.29%
Total votes		6,253	100.00%

== District 26 ==
House District 26 contained all of Harney and Malheur counties and elected one representative.

District 26 election 1 to be elected
Party	Candidate	Votes	%
Republican	Robert F. Smith	5,060	57.01%
Democratic	Elmil A. Stunz	3,814	42.97%
Write-in		2	0.02%
Total votes		8,876	100.00%

== District 27 ==
House District 27 contained all of Klamath and Lake counties and elected one representative. District 20 was embedded within it; these two counties and districts combined elected two representatives.

District 27 election 1 to be elected
Party	Candidate	Votes	%
Republican	George C. Flitcraft	12,084	100.00%
Total votes		12,084	100.00%

== District 28 ==
House District 28 contained all of Gilliam, Morrow, Sherman, Umatilla, and Wheeler counties and elected one representative. District 23 was embedded within it; these two counties and districts combined elected two representatives.

District 28 election 1 to be elected
Party	Candidate	Votes	%
Democratic	Jack L. Smith	8,992	51.18%
Republican	Gaylord M. Madison	8,577	48.82%
Total votes		17,569	100.00%

== See also ==
- 1962 Oregon State Senate election
- 1962 Oregon gubernatorial election
- 1962 Oregon Ballot Measure 6
- List of Oregon Legislative Assemblies
