= Julie Parrish (politician) =

American politician from Oregon (born 1974)

Member of the Oregon House of Representatives from the 37th district
- In office January 10, 2011 – January 13, 2019
- Preceded by: Scott Bruun
- Succeeded by: Rachel Prusak

Personal details
- Born: June 9, 1974 (age 52) Portland, Oregon
- Party: Republican
- Spouse: Colonel (Ret) Mark Parrish
- Children: 3
- Education: Bachelor of Communications, Southern Oregon University (2000); MBA, Marylhurst University (2009); JD, Willamette University College of Law (2023)
- Profession: Small Business Owner, PIP Communications; formerly CEO of Coupon Girls, LLC

Julie Parrish (born 1974) (born June 9, 1974) is an American politician and was a Republican member of the Oregon House of Representatives representing District 37 for four terms of office beginning on January 10, 2011, and ending on January 13, 2019.

Julie Parrish is the seventh generation of her family to live in Oregon, and the third legislator from her family to serve in the Oregon Legislature. Her family has been active in Oregon Republican Politics since 1874. Julie Parrish is the daughter of a Lebanese immigrant who came to Oregon in the late 1960s. Parrish is a small business owner and was admitted to the Oregon State Bar in October 2023.

== Elections ==
Rep. Julie Parrish was elected to four terms in a legislative district which held more Democrats than Republicans.

- 2018 Parrish lost her bid for a 5th term reelection in November 2018 to Democrat Rachel Prusak.
- 2016 Julie Parrish was uncontested in the May primary and won re-election in her district over Democrat Paul Southwick and Libertarian candidate Ryan Haffner. In addition to her own win, Parrish was the campaign consultant for Rep. Dennis Richardson (R-Central Point), who was running in a statewide bid for Oregon's Secretary of State. Richardson beat Sid Leiken in the Republican primary and went on to beat Democrat Brad Avakian for the Secretary of State race. Oregon hadn't had a Republican Secretary of State elected since 1980, nearly 40 years. Parrish was also the chief sponsor of the Oregon Veterans Lottery Bill, ballot Measure 96, to dedicate 1.5% of Oregon lottery dollars to veterans' programs and services. Oregon voters sided with Parrish and approved Measure 96 by nearly 84% of the electorate. The Willamette Week called Parrish's 2016 election night a "Trifecta" for having won her race, consulted a Secretary of State race that ending a decades-long drought for Republican statewide officeholders, and winning a ballot measure by one of the highest voting margins in statewide history.
- 2014 Rep. Parrish was uncontested in the May primary and won re-election against Democrat Gerritt Rosenthal with over 56% of the vote.
- 2012 Parrish was unopposed for the District 37 seat in the May 15, 2012, Republican primary, winning with 3,532 votes, and won the three-way November 6, 2012, General election with 16,122 votes (55.5%) against Democratic former Representative Carl Hosticka and Libertarian candidate Meredith Taggart.
- 2010 When Republican Representative Scott Bruun retired and left the District 37 seat open, Chael Sonnen was unopposed for the May 18, 2010, Republican primary, winning with 4,008 votes, but withdrew before the general election, Parrish won the July 7 special election by precinct committee persons to replace him, and won the November 2, 2010, General election with 13,498 votes (50.9%) against nominee Will Rasmussen.

== Electoral history ==
2010 Oregon State Representative, 37th district
Party	Candidate	Votes	%
Republican	Julie Parrish	13,498	50.9
Democratic	Will Rasmussen	12,982	48.9
Write-in		42	0.2
Total votes		26,522	100%

2012 Oregon State Representative, 37th district
Party	Candidate	Votes	%
Republican	Julie Parrish	16,122	50.7
Democratic	Carl Hosticka	14,925	47.0
Libertarian	Meredith Love Taggart	695	2.2
Write-in		28	0.1
Total votes		31,770	100%

2014 Oregon State Representative, 37th district
Party	Candidate	Votes	%
Republican	Julie Parrish	14,828	56.4
Democratic	Gerritt Rosenthal	11,365	43.3
Write-in		78	0.3
Total votes		26,271	100%

2016 Oregon State Representative, 37th district
Party	Candidate	Votes	%
Republican	Julie Parrish	18,971	53.8
Democratic	Paul Southwick	15,393	43.7
Libertarian	Ryan R Haffner	830	2.4
Write-in		63	0.2
Total votes		35,257	100%

2018 Oregon State Representative, 37th district
Party	Candidate	Votes	%
Democratic	Rachel Prusak	18,357	52.7
Republican	Julie Parrish	16,434	47.2
Write-in		51	0.1
Total votes		34,842	100%
