= Nurse-managed health center =

A nurse-managed health center provides health care services in areas in the United States where there is limited access to health care. Nurse-managed health centers provide health care to thousands of uninsured and underinsured people every year. The centers are usually affiliated with nursing schools, universities, or independent non-profit organizations. Nurse-managed health centers provide health care to vulnerable communities using a nursing model and is managed by advanced practice nurses.

== Overview ==
The first nurse-managed health center was created at Arizona State University over 25 years ago, and it is still in existence today. There are approximately 250 nurse-managed health centers in the United States, located in 39 states and the District of Columbia. Philadelphia has more nurse-managed health centers than any other city in the United States.

Nurse-managed health centers serve populations that are demographically similar to those served by Federally Qualified Health Centers (FQHCs). In some cases, nurse-managed health centers are FQHCs. Nurse-managed health centers tend to be located in or near low-income communities. Over half of the patients seen at nurse-managed health centers are females who come from racial/ethnic minority populations and are likely to have experienced health disparities.

Nurse-managed health centers are managed and staffed by advanced practice nurses, including nurse practitioners. In some nurse-managed Health Centers, nurses collaborate with physicians to provide care. In other nurse-managed health centers, nurses work independently.

The National Nursing Centers Consortium is the national nonprofit organization that works to advance nurse-led health care through policy, consultation, programs and applied research to reduce health disparities and meet people's primary care and wellness needs.

== Services provided ==
Many nurse-managed health centers provide a full range of primary care services including preventive care. Research has shown that nurses in nurse managed health centers spend more time with patients and include more preventive care than physicians. Some nurse-managed health centers also provide behavioral health services, including family and couples therapy. All nurse-managed health centers provide health promotion, wellness, and disease management services.

Nurse-managed health centers also focus on preventive health care, especially regarding certain chronic conditions like asthma, hypertension, diabetes, and obesity. This focus on preventative, holistic health care has been shown to reduce emergency room usage and decrease the length of hospital stays among nurse-managed health center patients.

== Representation ==
The National Nursing Centers Consortium (NNCC) is a 501(c)3 which advocates on behalf of nurse-managed health centers and nurse-led care. NNCC represents more than 250 nurse-managed health centers.

== See also ==
- Nurse practitioner
- Advanced Practice Nurse
