= Suzanne VanOrman =

American politician (born 1939)

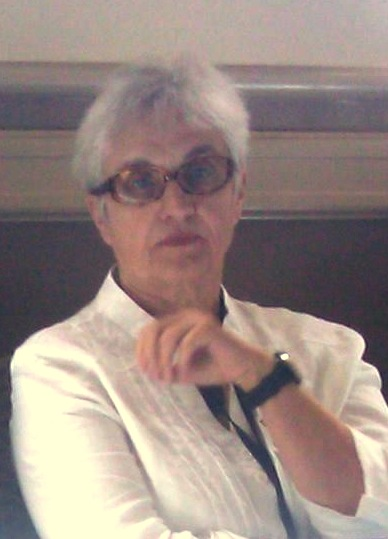

Member of the Oregon House of Representatives from the 52nd district
- In office 2009–2011
- Preceded by: Patti Smith
- Succeeded by: Mark Johnson

Personal details
- Born: July 1939 (age 86–87) Dubuque, Iowa, U.S.
- Party: Democratic
- Profession: Former executive director, Mid-Columbia Children's Council

Suzanne VanOrman (born July 1939) is an American politician from Oregon. A Democrat, she was a member of the Oregon House of Representatives, first elected in 2008. VanOrman, who resides in Hood River, represents District 52, which includes all of Hood River County and parts of Clackamas and Multnomah counties. She beat mixed martial artist and Olympic silver medalist Matt Lindland 52%–48% in the 2008 general election.

VanOrman served as Vice-Chair of the Agriculture, Natural Resources and Rural Communities committees. She also served on the Education and Human Services committees.

In 2010, she lost re-election to Republican Mark Johnson.

== Career ==
For more than 22 years, VanOrman was Executive Director of the Mid-Columbia Children’s Council. Under her leadership, the Council grew to eventually offer pre-K Head Start comprehensive services to 482 families in the greater Columbia Gorge area.

VanOrman served on the Oregon City Commission, the South Fork Water Board, Tri-Cities Services Budget Committee, Hood River County Commission on Children and Families, and the Clackamas County Children’s Commission. Most recently Suzanne was made a Committee Member of the Hood River Valley High School Local Committee.

== Electoral history ==
2006 Oregon State Representative, 52nd district
Party	Candidate	Votes	%
Republican	Patti Smith	12,588	55.7
Democratic	Suzanne VanOrman	9,994	44.2
Write-in		34	0.2
Total votes		22,616	100%

2008 Oregon State Representative, 52nd district
Party	Candidate	Votes	%
Democratic	Suzanne VanOrman	14,877	52.1
Republican	Matt Lindland	13,618	47.7
Write-in		81	0.3
Total votes		28,576	100%

2010 Oregon State Representative, 52nd district
Party	Candidate	Votes	%
Republican	Mark Johnson	14,012	56.5
Democratic	Suzanne VanOrman	10,739	43.3
Write-in		45	0.2
Total votes		24,796	100%
