= Oregon's 21st Senate district =

American legislative district

Oregon's 21st Senate District as of September 27, 2021

Oregon's 21st Senate district comprises parts of Clackamas and Multnomah counties, including Milwaukie and Oak Grove as well as parts of southeast Portland in the U.S. state of Oregon. It is composed of Oregon House districts 41 and 42. The district is currently represented by Democrat Kathleen Taylor of Portland.

== Election results ==
District boundaries have changed over time. Therefore, senators before 2021 may not represent the same constituency as today. From 1993 until 2003, the district covered parts of the Eugene metropolitan area; from 2003 until 2013, it shifted to cover southeast Portland and Milwaukie and stretched north to I-84; and from 2013 until 2023, it gained area to the south by adding Oak Grove.

The current district is very similar to its previous iteration, adding slightly more of Laurelhurst and losing much of Woodstock.

The results are as follows:

| Year | Candidate | Party | Percent | Opponent | Party | Percent | Opponent | Party | Percent |
|---|---|---|---|---|---|---|---|---|---|
| 1982 | Edward Fadeley | Democratic | 64.5% | Mike Cross | Republican | 35.5% | No third candidate | | |
| 1986 | Larry Hill | Democratic | 62.1% | Jack Roberts | Republican | 37.9% | No third candidate | | |
| 1990 | Larry Hill | Democratic | 70.2% | Ralf Walters | Republican | 29.8% | No third candidate | | |
| 1992 | Bill Dwyer | Democratic | 82.7% | Tonie Nathan | Libertarian | 17.3% | No third candidate | | |
| 1994 | Bill Dwyer | Democratic | 76.2% | Kathy Sniezko | Nonpartisan | 23.8% | No third candidate | | |
| 1998 | Lee Beyer | Democratic | 62.9% | Bill Lioio | Republican | 28.2% | Tonie Nathan | Libertarian | 8.9% |
| 2004 | Kate Brown | Democratic | 86.5% | Theresa A. Reed | Libertarian | 7.6% | Paul deParrie | Constitution | 5.2% |
| 2008 | Diane Rosenbaum | Democratic | 97.7% | Unopposed | | | | | |
| 2012 | Diane Rosenbaum | Democratic | 84.3% | Cliff Hutchison | Republican | 15.4% | No third candidate | | |
| 2016 | Kathleen Taylor | Democratic | 84.3% | James Ofsink | Progressive | 14.6% | Josh Howard | Libertarian | 8.2% |
| 2020 | Kathleen Taylor | Democratic | 97.6% | Unopposed | | | | | |
| 2024 | Kathleen Taylor | Democratic | 98.0% | Unopposed | | | | | |
