= Anna Williams (politician) =

American politician

Member of the Oregon House of Representatives from the 52nd district
- In office January 14, 2019 – August 14, 2022
- Preceded by: Jeff Helfrich
- Succeeded by: Lori Kuechler

Personal details
- Born: 1980 Wyoming
- Party: Democratic
- Education: University of Kansas
- Occupation: Academic Advisor; Adjunct Professor

Anna K. Williams (born 1980) is an American politician. She is a Democrat who represented the 52nd district in the Oregon House of Representatives.

== Biography ==
Anna Williams was born in 1980 in Wyoming. She attended the University of Kansas, where she earned a BS in Psychology in 2002 and a master's degree in Social Welfare Administration in 2005. In 2009, she moved to Hood River, Oregon where she lives with her husband and two sons. She works remotely for Simmons University as an adjunct professor and academic advisor.

== Political career ==
In 2018, Williams ran for the District 52 seat in the Oregon House of Representatives. She won the Democratic primary with 76.9% of the vote, and defeated Republican incumbent Jeff Helfrich in the general election with 51.4% of the vote. She was sworn in on January 14, 2019.

Williams sat on the following House committees:

- Interim Committee on Human Services and Housing (Vice-Chair)
- Interim Committee on Agriculture and Land Use

Williams was re-elected in 2020.

Upon the failure of SB1566, which would have raised the salary for state representatives. Williams, along with fellow representatives Karin Power and Rachel Prusak, announced her intention not to run for re-election. In a joint statement with Power and Prusak, they said they "could not afford to work full time for part-time pay."

Williams resigned from the state legislature to accept a role as the executive director of Oregon's System of Care Advisory Council, and her last day in office was August 14, 2022. She was replaced by Representative Lori Kuechler, who was appointed to serve the remainder of Williams' term.

== Electoral record ==
2018 Democratic primary election: Oregon House of Representatives, District 52
Party	Candidate	Votes	%
Democratic	Anna Williams	4,152	76.9%
Democratic	Aurora del Val	1,246	23.1%

2018 general election: Oregon House of Representatives, District 52
Party	Candidate	Votes	%
Democratic	Anna Williams	16,135	51.4%
Republican	Jeffrey Helfrich	15,238	48.5%
	Other/Write-in votes	41	0.1%

2020 Oregon State Representative, 52nd district
Party	Candidate	Votes	%
Democratic	Anna Williams	19,209	48.7
Republican	Jeff Helfrich	19,125	48.5
Libertarian	Stephen D Alder	1,060	2.7
Write-in		26	0.1
Total votes		39,420	100%
