= Oregon's 37th House district =

Legislative districts in the state of Oregon

Oregon's 37th House district after redistricting after the 2020 Census

District 37 of the Oregon House of Representatives is one of 60 House legislative districts in the state of Oregon. As of 2021, the boundary for the district contains portions of Clackamas and Washington counties. The district includes Tualatin and West Linn as well as parts of Lake Oswego and Wilsonville. The current representative for the district is Democrat Jules Walters of West Linn.

== Election results ==
District boundaries have changed over time. Therefore, representatives before 2021 may not represent the same constituency as today. General election results from 2000 to present are as follows:

Year	Candidate	Party	Percent	Opponent	Party	Percent	Opponent	Party	Percent	Opponent	Party	Percent	Write-in percentage
2000	Jeff Kropf	Republican	68.71%	Lori Workman	Democratic	31.29%	No third candidate			No fourth candidate			
2002	Randy Miller	Republican	63.72%	Bill Gleason	Democratic	36.27%	No third candidate			No fourth candidate			0.01%
2004	Scott Bruun	Republican	52.07%	Jim Morton	Democratic	44.46%	Marc Delphine	Libertarian	1.80%	Curtis Sommer	Pacific Green	1.66%	
2006	Scott Bruun	Republican	53.26%	Bev Backa	Democratic	44.51%	David Akin	Libertarian	2.15%	No fourth candidate			0.09%
2008	Scott Bruun	Republican	53.48%	Michele Eberle	Democratic	46.30%	No third candidate			No fourth candidate			0.23%
2010	Julie Parrish	Republican	50.79%	Will Rasmussen	Democratic	49.06%	No third candidate			No fourth candidate			0.15%
2012	Julie Parrish	Republican	50.75%	Carl Hosticka	Democratic	46.98%	Meredith Love Taggart	Libertarian	2.19%	No fourth candidate			0.09%
2014	Julie Parrish	Republican	56.44%	Gerritt Rosenthal	Democratic	43.26%	No third candidate			No fourth candidate			0.30%
2016	Julie Parrish	Republican	53.81%	Paul Southwick	Democratic	43.66%	Ryan Haffner	Libertarian	2.35%	No fourth candidate			0.18%
2018	Rachel Prusak	Democratic	52.69%	Julie Parrish	Republican	47.17%	No third candidate			No fourth candidate			0.15%
2020	Rachel Prusak	Democratic	57.15%	Kelly Sloop	Republican	42.75%	No third candidate			No fourth candidate			0.10%
2022	Jules Walters	Democratic	59.15%	Aeric Estep	Republican	40.73%	No third candidate			No fourth candidate			0.11%
2024	Jules Walters	Democratic	61.3%	Ben Edtl	Republican	38.6%	No third candidate			No fourth candidate			0.2%

== See also ==
- Oregon Legislative Assembly
- Oregon House of Representatives
