= Carolyn Tomei =

American politician (born 1936)

Member of the Oregon House of Representatives from the 41st district
- In office 2001–2015
- Preceded by: Jane Lokan
- Succeeded by: Kathleen Taylor

Mayor of Milwaukie, Oregon
- In office 1998–2001
- Preceded by: Donald Graf
- Succeeded by: James Bernard

Personal details
- Born: 1936 (age 89–90) Charleston, West Virginia, U.S.
- Party: Democratic
- Education: Portland State University
- Profession: Social worker
- Website: Legislative website

Carolyn Tomei (born 1936) is a Democratic politician from the US state of Oregon. She served in the Oregon House of Representatives for District 41, representing Milwaukie and parts of Southeast Portland, including Sellwood and Eastmoreland from 2001 to 2015.

== Early life and career ==
Tomei was born in Charleston, West Virginia. She earned a bachelor's degree in psychology and a master's degree in social work from Portland State University.

== Political career ==
Tomei served on the Milwaukie Planning Commission in the 1990s and was elected to the Milwaukie City Council in 1996. In 1998, she ran for mayor of Milwaukie, and won a three-person race by 2–1 margin over her closest competitor. Tomei was first elected mayor in a special election held March 10, 1998. The election was held following the recall of Mayor Craig Lomnicki. Tomei won the three-way race with 2,003 votes over Councilor Rob Kappa's 952 votes and former councilor Rick Farley's 819 votes. In the November, 1998 election, Tomei ran unopposed. In 2000, she ran for an open seat in the Oregon House of Representatives, previously held by Republican Jane Lokan. In the general election, Tomei defeated Republican Dick Jones. She was re-elected to the same seat six times.

In March 2014 she announced she would not run for another term.

== Personal ==
Tomei is married to Gary Michael, and the couple have 17 children, step children, and foster children.

== Beliefs ==
Raised Roman Catholic, Tomei later identified herself as a secular humanist. In January, 2013, while leading the Oregon House in reciting the Pledge of Allegiance Tomei changed the words "one nation under God" to "one nation under love." In December, 2013, Tomei was endorsed by the Freethought Equality PAC because of her "commitment to promote a more secular government and a will to protect the rights of all people, including the now 20 percent of Americans that don't identify with any particular religion."

== Electoral history ==
2004 Oregon State Representative, 41st district
Party	Candidate	Votes	%
Democratic	Carolyn Tomei	20,549	72.7
Republican	Steven D. Rowe	6,953	24.6
Constitution	Rita Lynn	655	2.3
Write-in		116	0.4
Total votes		28,273	100%

2006 Oregon State Representative, 41st district
Party	Candidate	Votes	%
Democratic	Carolyn Tomei	15,998	96.9
Write-in		510	3.1
Total votes		16,508	100%

2008 Oregon State Representative, 41st district
Party	Candidate	Votes	%
Democratic	Carolyn Tomei	21,302	80.1
Republican	Randy Uchytil	5,181	19.5
Write-in		110	0.4
Total votes		26,593	100%

2010 Oregon State Representative, 41st district
Party	Candidate	Votes	%
Democratic	Carolyn Tomei	17,092	75.8
Republican	Hugo Schulz	5,385	23.9
Write-in		66	0.3
Total votes		22,543	100%

2012 Oregon State Representative, 41st district
Party	Candidate	Votes	%
Democratic	Carolyn Tomei	22,530	72.3
Republican	Timothy E McMenamin	8,559	27.5
Write-in		67	0.2
Total votes		31,156	100%
