= Henry Silver =

American physician

Henry K. Silver
- Born: 1918; Philadelphia, Pennsylvania, U.S.
- Died: 1991 (aged 72–73); Denver, Colorado, U.S.
- Education: University of California at Berkeley
- Known for: Russell-Silver syndrome Physician extender education
- Scientific career
- Fields: Medicine

Henry K. Silver (1918–1991) was an American pediatrician who influenced the early development of the physician assistant and nurse practitioner roles in the United States. Silver co-created the nation's first pediatric nurse practitioner education program in the 1960s along with Nurse Educator Loretta Ford, and he helped establish a pediatric physician assistant program a few years later. In his later career, Silver studied and published on the abuse of medical students by physicians.

== Biography ==
Henry Silver was born in Philadelphia in 1918. He attended medical school at the University of California at Berkeley. Silver served on the faculty at the University of California Medical School and Yale University School of Medicine early in his career. In 1957, Silver joined the University of Colorado School of Medicine. From 1978 to his death, Silver served as the medical school's associate dean of admissions.

While at Colorado, he created a pediatric nurse practitioner (PNP) program in 1964, which represented the first nurse practitioner program in the nation. The PNP program opened the next year. The successful utilization of the program's nurse practitioners led to Silver's interest in creating physician assistant (PA) training programs. A school nurse practitioner was later created at Colorado as well.

Silver founded the pediatric PA program at Colorado in 1969. The initial concept behind the PA program was to train pediatric providers with five years of education after high school rather than the eleven years that it took to become a pediatrician. The program, designed to mitigate a physician shortage, initially awarded bachelor's degrees. The program's first nine graduates, who were all female and who were initially known as child care associates, began to practice in clinics and hospitals in 1972.

Silver coined the term deprivation dwarfism to describe stunted child growth in spite of voracious eating. After a study of several affected children, Silver and a colleague attributed the situation to a lack of parental affection. Another growth disorder, Russell-Silver syndrome, is named in part after him. He was the co-author of a 1990 study which examined mistreatment among 431 medical students. Eighty percent of the students in the study reported incidents of mistreatment during medical school.

Silver had a son, Andrew, and a wife, Harriet.

Silver died of cancer in January 1991 at University Hospital in Denver.
