= Oregon's 41st House district =

Legislative districts in the state of Oregon

Oregon's 41st House district after redistricting after the 2020 Census

District 41 of the Oregon House of Representatives is one of 60 House legislative districts in the state of Oregon. As of 2021, the boundary for the district contains portions of Clackamas and Multnomah counties. The district includes Milwaukie and Oak Grove as well as the Eastmoreland, Sellwood, and Woodstock neighborhoods of southeast Portland. The current representative for the district is Democrat Mark Gamba of Milwaukie.

The district is relatively diverse in that it includes upscale, middle-class, and working-class neighborhoods.

== Election results ==
District boundaries have changed over time. Therefore, representatives before 2021 may not represent the same constituency as today. General election results from 2000 to present are as follows:

| Year | Candidate | Party | Percent | Opponent | Party | Percent | Opponent | Party | Percent | Write-in percentage |
|---|---|---|---|---|---|---|---|---|---|---|
| 2000 | Vicki Walker | Democratic | 53.15% | Jeff Miller | Republican | 46.85% | No third candidate | | | |
| 2002 (Note: Carolyn Tomei was the incumbent in this election. She previously represented District 25, but was moved to this district due to redistricting following the 2000 United States census.) | Carolyn Tomei | Democratic | 79.86% | Matt Fisher | Libertarian | 19.25% | No third candidate | | | 0.89% |
| 2004 | Carolyn Tomei | Democratic | 72.98% | Steven Rowe | Republican | 24.69% | Rita Lynn | Constitution | 2.33% | |
| 2006 | Carolyn Tomei | Democratic | 96.92% | Unopposed | | | | | | 3.08% |
| 2008 | Carolyn Tomei | Democratic | 80.10% | Randy Uchytil | Republican | 19.48% | No third candidate | | | 0.41% |
| 2010 | Carolyn Tomei | Democratic | 75.66% | Hugo Schulz | Republican | 24.05% | No third candidate | | | 0.29% |
| 2012 | Carolyn Tomei | Democratic | 72.31% | Timothy McMenamin | Republican | 27.47% | No third candidate | | | 0.22% |
| 2014 | Kathleen Taylor | Democratic | 70.49% | Timothy McMenamin | Republican | 29.08% | No third candidate | | | 0.44% |
| 2016 | Karin Power | Democratic | 71.35% | Timothy McMenamin | Republican | 28.43% | No third candidate | | | 0.22% |
| 2018 | Karin Power | Democratic | 97.14% | Unopposed | | | | | | 2.86% |
| 2020 | Karin Power | Democratic | 73.74% | Michael Newgard | Republican | 26.11% | No third candidate | | | 0.15% |
| 2022 | Mark Gamba | Democratic | 78.21% | Rob Reynolds | Republican | 21.67% | No third candidate | | | 0.12% |
| 2024 | Mark Gamba | Democratic | 79.9% | Elvis Clark | Republican | 20.0% | No third candidate | | | 0.2% |

== See also ==
- Oregon Legislative Assembly
- Oregon House of Representatives
