= Loretta Ford =

American nurse and academic (1920–2025)

- Born: Loretta Cecelia Pfingstel; December 28, 1920; New York City, U.S.
- Died: January 22, 2025 (aged 104); Wildwood, Florida, U.S.
- Education: Robert Wood Johnson University Hospital (then Middlesex General Hospital) in New Brunswick, New Jersey, Diploma in Nursing, 1941; University of Colorado School of Nursing, B.S. 1949 and Master's 1951 University of Colorado, EdD 1961
- Spouse: William Ford (m. 1947)
- Children: Valerie, daughter
- Medical career
- Profession: Nurse educator
- Field: Advanced practice nursing
- Institutions: University of Colorado School of Nursing in Denver, Assistant Professor 1955, Professor 1965 University of Rochester School of Nursing, Dean 1972, retired 1985
- Research: Nurse Practitioner program development, Unification model of nursing
- Awards: Living Legend of the American Academy of Nursing

Loretta Cecelia Ford (née Pfingstel; December 28, 1920 – January 22, 2025) was an American nurse and the co-founder of the first nurse practitioner program. Along with pediatrician Henry Silver, Ford started the pediatric nurse practitioner program at the University of Colorado in 1965. In 1972, Ford joined the University of Rochester as founding dean of their nursing school.

== Early life ==
Loretta Pfingstel was born in the Bronx, New York City on December 28, 1920. Raised in the Haskell section of Wanaque, New Jersey, she graduated with high honor from Butler High School in 1937. When she was young, she wanted to be a teacher, but her family's financial situation led her to choose a less costly educational path. When Ford graduated from high school at 16, she was too young to enter a postgraduate training program, so she worked at Middlesex General Hospital (now Robert Wood Johnson University Hospital) in New Brunswick, New Jersey, as a nurses' aide.

While working in the hospital, Ford lived and studied with nursing students, and she decided to pursue nursing as a career. After a year and a half as a nurses' aide, Ford entered the nursing program at Middlesex General and received her Diploma in Nursing in 1941.

== Career ==
After graduation, Ford joined the Visiting Nurse Service (VNS) of New Brunswick. However, her tenure with VNS was short-lived. In 1942, following the death of her fiancé in World War II, Ford joined the United States Army Air Forces and became a first lieutenant. She had hoped to enter flight nurse training, but was denied due to her vision, and instead served at base hospitals in Florida and Maine. Through the G.I. Bill, Ford was then able to attend the University of Colorado Boulder, where she completed a B.S. in nursing with a Public Health Nursing certificate (1949) and Master of Public Health Nursing Supervision (1951). At University of Colorado, Ford was mentored and impacted by several influential figures in nursing and public health including Lucile Petry Leone, Pearl Parvin Coulter, and Henrietta Loughran. During this time, Ford was also working as a public health nurse for Boulder County and eventually became the director of nursing at the Boulder City-County Health department.

In 1961, Ford received her Doctorate in Nursing Education also from the University of Colorado Boulder. Her doctoral work was in the development of cases in public health nursing administration and was supported through a National League for Nursing fellowship. Prior to completion of her EdD, Ford was already an assistant professor at the University of Colorado School of Nursing in Denver, and then earned full professorship in 1965. It was during her tenure at University of Colorado that Ford co-developed the first nurse practitioner program. In 1971, she was elected to the National Academy of Medicine. Ford became the founding dean of the nursing school at the University of Rochester in 1972 and Director of Clinical Nursing at the university's teaching hospital, the Strong Memorial Hospital. At the University of Rochester, Ford developed the unification model of nursing.

== Founding of nurse practitioner programs ==
As a public health nurse for Boulder County, Ford worked in rural Colorado in the 1940s and 1950s. Through University of Colorado's public health nursing program, Ford became one of the first test field teachers, training students from the Denver Visiting Nurse Service in these communities. During this time, she noted a deficit of care in these communities, which she and other nurses filled with temporary health clinics. This experience confirmed for Ford that nurses could independently fill gaps in healthcare if offered specialized training. Ford was given the opportunity to begin developing the specialized training she envisioned through the Western Interstate Commission for Higher Education in Nursing. With this organization, Ford was part of a team of educators who developed a specialized clinical curriculum for community health, a curriculum she brought to University of Colorado to further develop.

In 1965, Ford joined with pediatrician Henry Silver to create the pediatric nurse practitioner program at the University of Colorado. This was the first nurse practitioner program in the United States. The program was introduced in a Pediatrics journal article in 1967 as, "a new educational and training program in pediatrics for professional nurses which has been developed to provide increased health care for children in both rural and urban areas."

Early nurse practitioner programs faced opposition from established faculty at nursing schools. Due to the medical component of the curriculum, physicians were now involved in training nurses. Opponents were concerned this would lead to a supervisory relationship between nurse practitioners and physicians, instead of a cooperative relationship between independent colleagues. Critics felt this approach would allow medicine to usurp nursing. Additionally, there was a great deal of prejudice around the abilities of nurses that Ford worked to overcome in these first nurse practitioner programs.

== Unification Model of Nursing ==
During her tenure as Dean at the University of Rochester, Ford developed a holistic approach to nursing education called the Unification Model of Nursing. The model is designed to include education, research, and clinical practice in the training of nurses.

== Personal life and death ==
As an undergraduate, Loretta married William Ford in 1947, and her daughter was born in 1952.

Ford retired in 1985 and moved to Florida.

Ford turned 100 in December 2020, and died in Wildwood, Florida on January 22, 2025, at the age of 104.

== Awards ==
In 1989, Ford received the Ruth B. Freeman Award in the Public Health Nursing Section from the American Public Health Association. In 1990, she received the Gustav O. Lienhard Award from the National Academy of Medicine. Ford was named a Living Legend by the American Academy of Nursing in 1999. In 2003, she received the Lifetime Achievement Award from The Nurse Practitioner. She was honored with the Elizabeth Blackwell Award from Hobart and William Smith Colleges that same year; the award honors "a woman whose life exemplifies outstanding service to humanity." She was inducted into the National Women's Hall of Fame in 2011. In 2012, she was inducted into the Colorado Women's Hall of Fame. In 2020, Ford received the US Surgeon General's Medallion, awarded for exceptional achievements in the cause of public health and medicine. Ford held honorary doctorates from six universities.

== See also ==
- List of Living Legends of the American Academy of Nursing
