= The Journal for Nurse Practitioners =

- Discipline: Nurse Practitioner
- Language: English
- Edited by: Marilyn W. Edmunds

Publication details
- History: 2005-present
- Publisher: Elsevier for American Association of Nurse Practitioners (USA)
- Frequency: 10/year
- Impact factor: 0.767 (2020)

Standard abbreviations
- ISO 4: J. Nurse Pract.

Indexing
- ISSN: 1555-4155 (print); 1878-058X (web)
- OCLC no.: 58732683

Links
- Journal homepage; Online access; Journal information at publisher's website

The Journal for Nurse Practitioners is a peer-reviewed nursing journal for nurse practitioners and is the official journal of the American Association of Nurse Practitioners.

== Abstracting and indexing ==
The journal is covered by the following abstracting and indexing services: CINAHL and Scopus
