= Nurse practitioner =

Mid-level medical provider

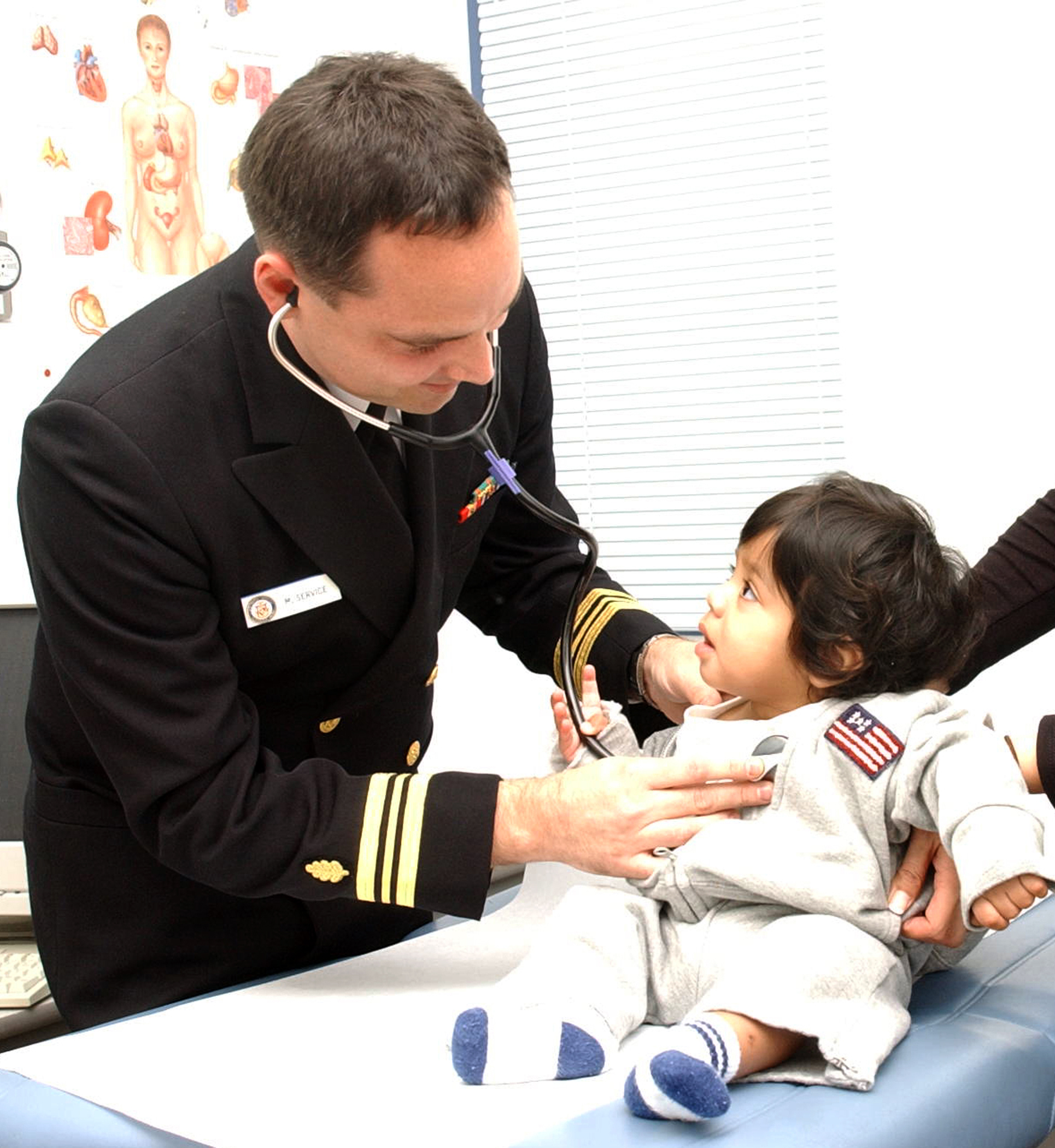
- A Navy nurse practitioner assessing a patient

Occupation
- Occupation type: Professional
- Activity sectors: Nursing

Description
- Education required: Depends on the country, but generally includes at least a post-graduate nursing degree
- Fields of employment: Healthcare
- Related jobs: Registered nurse

A nurse practitioner (NP) is an advanced practice registered nurse and a type of mid-level practitioner. NPs are trained to assess patient needs, order and interpret diagnostic and laboratory tests, diagnose disease, prescribe medications, and formulate treatment plans. NP training covers basic disease prevention, coordination of care, and health promotion.

== History ==
=== United States ===
The present-day concept of advanced practice nursing as a primary care provider was created in the mid-1960s, spurred on by a national shortage of physicians. The first formal graduate certificate program for NPs was created by Henry Silver, a physician, and Loretta Ford, a nurse, in 1965. In 1971, the US Secretary of Health, Education and Welfare, Elliot Richardson, made a formal recommendation for expanding the scope of nursing practice to be able to serve as primary care providers. In 2012, discussions arose between accreditation agencies, national certifying bodies, and state boards of nursing about the possibility of making the Doctor of Nursing Practice (DNP) degree the new minimum standard of education for NP certification and licensure by 2015.

=== Canada ===
Advanced practice nursing first appeared in the 1990s in Ontario. These nurses practiced in neonatal intensive care units within tertiary care hospitals in collaboration with pediatricians and neonatologists. Although the role of these nurses initially resembled a blended version of clinical nurse specialists and NPs, today the distinction has been more formally established.

== Nurse practitioners in the United States ==
=== Education requirements ===
Becoming a nurse practitioner in the United States requires either a Master of Science in Nursing (MSN) or Doctor of Nursing Practice (DNP). During their studies, nurse practitioners are required to receive a minimum of 500 hours of clinical training in addition to the clinical hours required to obtain their RN. Upon completion of the graduate program, they must pass the National NP Certification Board Exam, specific to their specialization. After passing this exam, candidates must apply for NP licensure, which varies by state regulations. In 2026 the United States had 42.4 nurse practitioners per 100 physicians, ranging from 25.1 in Hawaii to 86.1 in Mississippi, according to a ProfessionLens count.

During the Master’s degree program, the nursing students are challenged with extensive amount of clinical training hours to have the experience and understand the reality of nurse practitioner duties. Certification readiness is tested throughout the clinical hours and study which lay the ground of diagnosis of patients and treatments. These exams are called academic clinical partnerships (ACPs) and integrate diagnostic readiness tests (DRTs) help development of the education and skills required of the curriculum that sets them up for field responsibility.

Although nurse practitioners are required to be licensed as registered nurses prior to obtaining their advanced practice registered nurse certification, there are several programs that combine a nursing undergraduate degree with nurse practitioner training. Some US nurse practitioner programs are highly selective, with admission rates as low as 6% of applicants at University of California, Irvine in 2020, and others are more inclusive, with up to 100% acceptance rates in 2019 at public universities such as Northwestern State University of Louisiana and the online branch of Purdue University.

=== Training pathways ===
There are many types of nurse practitioner programs in the United States, with the vast majority being in the specialty of a family nurse practitioner (FNP). There are also psychiatric, adult–geriatric acute care, adult–geriatric primary care, pediatric, women's health, and neonatal nurse practitioner programs. Many of these programs have their pre-clinical or didactic courses taught online with proctored examinations. Once the students start their clinical courses, they have online material but are required to perform clinical hours at an approved facility under the guidance of an NP or physician. Each clinical course has specific requirements that vary depending on the program's degree or eligibility for certification. For instance, FNPs are required to see patients across the lifespan during their training, whereas adult geriatric NPs do not see anyone below the age of 13.

Nurse practitioners may pursue dual or multiple certifications by completing additional graduate-level training, such as post-master's certificates or Doctor of Nursing Practice (DNP) programs. Upon satisfying the educational and clinical requirements for these secondary specialties, they become eligible for further board certification and expanded clinical practice. For instance, a family nurse practitioner (FNP) may obtain a post-master's certificate in psychiatric-mental health to qualify for dual certification as an FNP/PMHNP.

=== Quality of care ===
A 2011 review of studies comparing outcomes of care by NPs and physicians in primary care and urgent care settings found that outcomes were generally comparable, although the strength of the evidence was generally low due to limited study duration and participant numbers. A 2020 study showed nurse practitioners practicing in states with independent prescription authority were more than twenty times more likely to overprescribe opioids than nurse practitioners in prescription-restricted states. The same study identified that both nurse practitioners and physician assistants were more likely to overprescribe opioids compared to physicians. Nurse practitioners and physician assistants were also associated with more unnecessary imaging services than primary care physicians, which may have ramifications on care and overall costs.

A 2017 systematic review suggested "that the implementation of advanced practice nursing roles in emergency and critical care settings improves patient outcomes in emergency and critical care settings".

=== Job setting ===
Nurse practitioners are currently employed in a wide variety of practice settings. These settings include the ambulatory, inpatient, or emergency departments of hospitals, health clinics, and office practices, whether private or nurse-run. In addition, they deliver care in schools and on college campuses, as well as in nursing homes and assisted living facilities. NPs can work alone or under the supervision of a physician in a wide variety of specializations.

Transition from RN to a NP comes with hidden challenges at the job. The work is familiar since they were once a RN but the new achievement as a NP come with responsibilities and invisible balance of stressors and management of team. To persevere in the first-year transition period is to have a healthy mindset and finding reliable work relationships.

== Scope of practice ==
=== Australia ===
In Australia, a nurse practitioner-endorsed registered nurse has an expanded scope of practice, allowing them to practice certain advanced clinical skills within their endorsed field. As a nurse practitioner, they can complete advanced health assessments, diagnose and treat diseases, order diagnostic testing such as imaging and pathology, and prescribe medications and therapeutics. They are also able to register for a provider number with Medicare for the services they provide to patients, excluding services provided in public facilities (such as a Queensland Health hospital).

Nurse practitioner items on the Medicare Benefits Schedule, however, provide significantly smaller rebates than equivalent items for General Practitioners, leading to a higher out-of-pocket cost to patients. To claim Medicare rebates, the NP must also be in a documented "Collaborative Practice Arrangement" with a medical practitioner and the episode of care approved by a doctor. Prescriptions issued by NPs must also be verified by a medical practitioner to be eligible to be subsidised under the Pharmaceutical Benefits Scheme.

=== Canada ===
In Canada, an NP is a registered nurse (RN) with a graduate degree in nursing. Canada recognizes them in primary care and acute care practices. NPs diagnose illnesses and medical conditions, prescribe Schedule 1 medications, order and interpret diagnostic tests, and perform procedures, within their scope of practice, and may build their own panel of patients at the same level as physicians. Primary care NPs work in places like primary care and community healthcare centers, as well as long-term care institutions. The main focus of primary care NPs includes health promotion, preventative care, and the diagnosis and treatment of acute and chronic diseases and conditions. Acute care NPs serve a specific population of patients. They generally work in in-patient facilities that include neonatology, nephrology, and cardiology units. There are currently three specialties for nurse practitioners in Canada: family practice, pediatrics, and adult care. NPs who specialize in family practice work at the same level and offer the same services as family physicians, with the exception of Quebec, where only physicians are allowed to formulate a medical diagnosis.

=== Ireland ===
In Ireland's publicly funded healthcare system, the Health Service Executive has the advanced nurse practitioner (ANP) grade. ANPs may prescribe medications.

=== United Kingdom ===
In the United Kingdom nurse practitioners carry out care at an advanced practice level. They commonly work in primary care (e.g., GP surgeries) or A&E departments, although they are increasingly being seen in other areas of practice.

The nurse practitioner role was recommended by the Cumberlege Report 1986, which recommended nurses be given the ability to prescribe.

=== United States ===
The scope of practice for a NP in the US is defined by law and varies depending on the jurisdiction. Because the profession is state-regulated, the scope of practice varies by state. Some states allow NPs to have full practice authority; however, in other states, a written collaborative or supervisory agreement with a physician is legally required for practice. Autonomous practice was introduced in the 1980s, mostly in states facing a physician shortage or that struggled to find enough healthcare providers to work in rural areas. The extent of this collaborative agreement and the roles, duties, responsibilities, nursing treatments, and pharmacologic recommendations again vary widely between states.

NPs are legally able to examine patients, diagnose medical conditions, prescribe most medications, and deliver treatments. There is variation in the level of supervision required for NPs across different states. As of 2023, 27 states grant NPs full practice authority, meaning they can practice independently without physician oversight or supervision. The remaining 23 states require NPs to have a collaborative agreement with a physician to provide patient care. Within these 23 states, 11 further require NPs to have physician supervision or delegation for specific aspects of practice, though the physician might not be physically present at the treatment location.

==== Policy during the COVID-19 pandemic ====
The pandemic expanded the scope of practice for nurse practitioners in much of the US as a result of temporary legislative policy adjustments. In the US, the Trump administration waived many requirements for nurse practitioners, permitting NPs to utilize their abilities to the fullest extent in some cases.

== Licensing and board certification ==
=== Australia ===
In Australia, nursing registration, including endorsement of a RN as a nurse practitioner, is overseen by the Nursing and Midwifery Board of Australia (NMBA) and the Australian Health Practitioner Regulation Agency (AHPRA). Registered nurses working in rural and isolated communities can apply for scheduled medicine prescriber endorsement if clinically necessary and trained and instead become a prescribing registered nurse rather than a nurse practitioner to better meet the needs of less-resourced communities. Nurse practitioners are professionally represented by the Australian College of Nurse Practitioners, as well as the Australian College of Nursing. Endorsement as a nurse practitioner in either Australia or New Zealand is recognised by both countries as part of the Trans-Tasman Mutual Recognition Scheme.

For a RN to apply to the NMBA for nurse practitioner endorsement, they must possess an unrestricted RN licence and be able to demonstrate they have completed at least 5000 hours (three years, full-time equivalent) at an "advanced nursing practice" level. Advanced nursing practice is loosely defined, and not a specific role, but rather a recognised process of higher-level clinical practice within a nurse's existing scope of practice. The RN must also complete an approved nurse practitioner postgraduate master's degree or demonstrate they have gained qualifications to an equivalent level in advanced health assessment, pharmacology, therapeutics, diagnostics, and research. Nurses applying through the latter pathway must also demonstrate that the equivalent training is clinically relevant to the field for which they wish to apply for nurse practitioner endorsement in.

=== Canada ===
In Canada, the educational standard is a graduate degree in nursing. The Canadian Nursing Association (CNA) notes that advanced practice nurses must have a combination of graduate-level education and clinical experience that prepare them to practice at an advanced level. Their education alone does not give them the ability to practice at an advanced level. Two national frameworks have been developed in order to provide further guidance for the development of educational courses and requirements, research concepts, and government position statements regarding advanced practice nursing: the CNA's Advanced Nursing Practice: A National Framework and the Canadian Nurse Practitioner Core Competency Framework. All educational programs for NPs must achieve formal approval by provincial and territorial regulating nurse agencies due to the fact that the NP is considered a legislated role in Canada. As such, it is common to see differences among approved educational programs between territories and provinces. Specifically, inconsistencies can be found in core graduate courses, clinical experiences, and the length of programs. Canada does not have a national curriculum or consistent standards regarding advanced practice nurses. All advanced practice nurses must meet individual requirements set by their provincial or territorial regulatory nursing body.

=== Israel ===
As of November 2013, NPs were recognized legally in Israel.

=== United States ===
The most common path to becoming a nurse practitioner in the United States begins by earning a Bachelor of Science in Nursing (BSN) and passing the National Council Licensure Examination (NCLEX) to become an RN. One must then be accepted into and complete a Master of Science in Nursing (MSN) or Doctor of Nursing Practice (DNP) to gain additional nursing training in their specialty area. Finally, one must pass a national NP board certification exam.

== Salary ==
The salary of an NP generally depends on the area of specialization, location, years of experience, and level of education. In 2022, the American Association of Nurse Practitioners (AANP) conducted a NP salary survey. The results revealed the reported median base salary among full-time NPs was $113,000. As of 2024, according to the US Bureau of Labor Statistics, the median salary of NPs was $126,260.

== See also ==
- Advanced practice nurse
- The Journal for Nurse Practitioners
- List of nursing credentials
- Nurse anesthetist
- Nurse midwife
- The Nurse Practitioner: The American Journal of Primary Healthcare
- Nurse-managed health center
- Martha K. Schwebach
