= Nursing degrees in the United States =

Nursing is the largest healthcare profession in the United States, with more than 3.1 million registered nurses. Between 2012 and 2022, employment for nurses is projected to grow by 19 percent, which is more than any other profession. Nurses make up the largest component of staff in hospitals but are also able to provide care in clinic settings, patient's homes, schools, nursing homes, public health agencies, and mental health centers. In addition, nurses can be found in the military, in industry, nursing education, and do health care research. Nurses in these various roles and settings can provide direct patient care and case management, but also develop and establish nursing practice and quality standards within complex healthcare systems. As each degree can provide a different level of care for patients and function in vastly different roles, it is important to differentiate between them. The levels of nursing degrees have different educational requirements, licensure, and credentialing that can vary state to state.

== Licensed Practical Nurse ==
The education required for a Licensed Practical Nurse/Licensed Vocational Nurse is the completion of a 12-18 month program, typically at a technical college. The program focuses on task activities and prepares the nurse for the National Council Licensure Examination for Licensed Practical Nurses (NCLEX). Requirements for taking the NCLEX-PN include having a high school diploma or equivalent and successful completion of an accredited practical/vocational nursing program. LPN/LVNs work in a variety of settings including hospitals, clinics, nursing homes, rehabilitation centers, schools, and individual or group homes. Scope of practice for LPN/LVNs is defined by individual states, but each organization may narrow the scope of the LPN/LVN.

== Hospital-Based Diploma Nurse ==
Hospital-based Diplomas in Nursing were historically the primary form of nursing education, first appearing in the early 20th century. The number of facilities offering this degree as well as the number of nurses obtaining their education through them have declined since the 1970s due to the growth of Associate Degree in Nursing and Bachelor of Science in Nursing programs at colleges and universities, as well as increasing financial constraints on hospitals and the healthcare systems. Diploma programs were the most abundant in the 1950s and 1960s, with nearly 1,300 diploma programs active nationwide. Presently, less than 10 percent of nursing degree programs are diploma programs, which produce less than 6 percent of registered nurses. The majority of the remaining diploma programs in the United States are concentrated in the Midwest and on the East Coast. Programs for hospital diplomas are traditionally sponsored and run by hospitals in the community, as their name implies. Courses are taught proximal to and in conjunction with the hospital, where students have practical application of their skills on the units and wards in the sponsoring facility. Diploma programs typically have a strong focus on practical application of skills, with a larger percentage of time spent on the “hands-on” component of learning. Students attend classes for two to three years, at the completion of which they take the National Council Licensure Examination for Registered Nurses (NCLEX-RN) certifying exam, a standard exam for all practicing registered nurses. Students graduate with a diploma in nursing, and passing of the NCLEX-RN allows for certification and state licensure, which permits the graduate to practice as a full registered nurse within his or her state's statutes. Coursework taken in a diploma nursing program can frequently be used for credits toward nursing degrees such as a BSN or ADN.

== Associate Degree in Nursing ==
An Associate Degree in Nursing (ADN) is the minimum educational requirement to become a registered nurse in the United States. All ADN prepared nurses are credentialed through individual state nursing boards after passing the NCLEX-RN. In order to be eligible to take the NCLEX-RN exam, candidates must have a high school diploma or its equivalent and a degree from a board of nursing approved nursing program. ADN nursing programs typically take two years to complete but courses required differ by state. The standard course requirement includes anatomy, physiology, microbiology, chemistry, nutrition, psychology. Background checks are also performed on all candidates prior to granting licensure. Associate degree nurses are able to work in both outpatient and inpatient settings. Of the almost 3.1 million registered nurses in the United States, 36.1 percent of them have an associate degrees in nursing.

== Bachelor of Science Degree in Nursing ==
Bachelor of Science in Nursing (BSN) degrees prepare nurses for a wide variety of professional roles and graduate study within nursing. It is typically acquired through a four-year program at a college or university. Baccalaureate programs include a variety of liberal arts courses and professional education and training in the nursing field. It contains additional education beyond that of an ADN that often includes physical and social sciences, communication, leadership, and critical thinking. There are 674 BSN programs in the United States. BSN programs are approved by each state's individual board of nursing that allows students to sit for the NCLEX-RN examination to obtain a license as a registered nurse Some states have accelerated programs called “RN-to-BSN” or “BSN completion” for registered nurses with associate degrees wanting to obtain their bachelor's degree in nursing. In 2010, the Institute of Medicine called for 80 percent of nurses in the U.S. to be baccalaureate trained by the year 2020, and this has created a push for healthcare organizations to make a BSN a hiring requirement for registered nurses and instituting education assistance programs for those with associate degrees.

== Master of Science Degree in Nursing ==
The Master of Science in Nursing (MSN) is an advanced degree that allows for a more specialized role in nursing. The master's prepared nurse has a wide array of careers that he or she might aspire to fill. Career paths include certified nurse practitioner (CNP), certified nurse anesthetist (CRNA), clinical nurse specialist (CNS), or Certified Nurse‐Midwife (CNM). Some other areas the MSN prepared nurse might focus are in public health, business administration or health administration. Education curriculum may vary between 18 and 24 months of full-time graduate level studies, with program length determined by the specified field. The certification exams for a master's prepared nurse are dependent upon the role being pursued. For example, the CNM takes the American Midwifery Certification Board exam and nurse administrators may receive their certification from the American Nurses Credentialing Center (ANCC). Master's prepared nurses are trained in advanced assessment, counseling of patients, management, leadership, research and education. They may work in both inpatient and outpatient settings as well as educational institutions, and scope of practice may vary state-by-state.

== Doctor of Nursing Practice Degree ==
The scope of practice for a Doctor of Nursing Practice (DNP) includes assessing, diagnosing, prescribing, consulting, screening, educating, initiating referrals, and the coordination of patient care. There are numerous specialties DNPs may pursue including Acute Care Nurse Practitioner, Adult Nurse Practitioner, Adult-gerontology nurse practitioner (acute or primary care), Adult Psychiatric- Mental Health Nurse Practitioner, Family Nurse Practitioner, Gerontological Nurse Practitioner, Pediatric Nurse Practitioner (acute or primary care), and School Nurse Practitioner. Specific practice guidelines can vary by state and area of practice. In order to become a DNP, one would need to obtain his or her doctorate in nursing practice. Specific program requirements vary with each program. After completing the doctorate program, one must pass the specific certification exam that corresponds to his or her specialty prior to initiating practice. In 2014, there were 3,065 DNP graduates.

== Doctor of Philosophy in Nursing ==
Nurses who hold a Doctor of Philosophy Degree in Nursing (PhD), are less about hands-on patient care and more about the abstract thinking that helps move the profession forward. A nurse with a PhD has the training needed to conduct research aimed at changing nursing science or practice. The education for a PhD in nursing includes courses in scientific research methodologies and statistics and philosophy of science. Either a BSN or MSN degree are required for entry into a PhD program. Credit requirements vary by program and state and typically take anywhere from three to five years to complete. PhD programs do not have clinical practice hour requirements like DNP programs. PhD prepared nurses teach as academic faculty, conduct research, evaluate programs, hold academic and leadership positions, write books, and lead health care organizations.
