= Critical care nursing =

Field of nursing

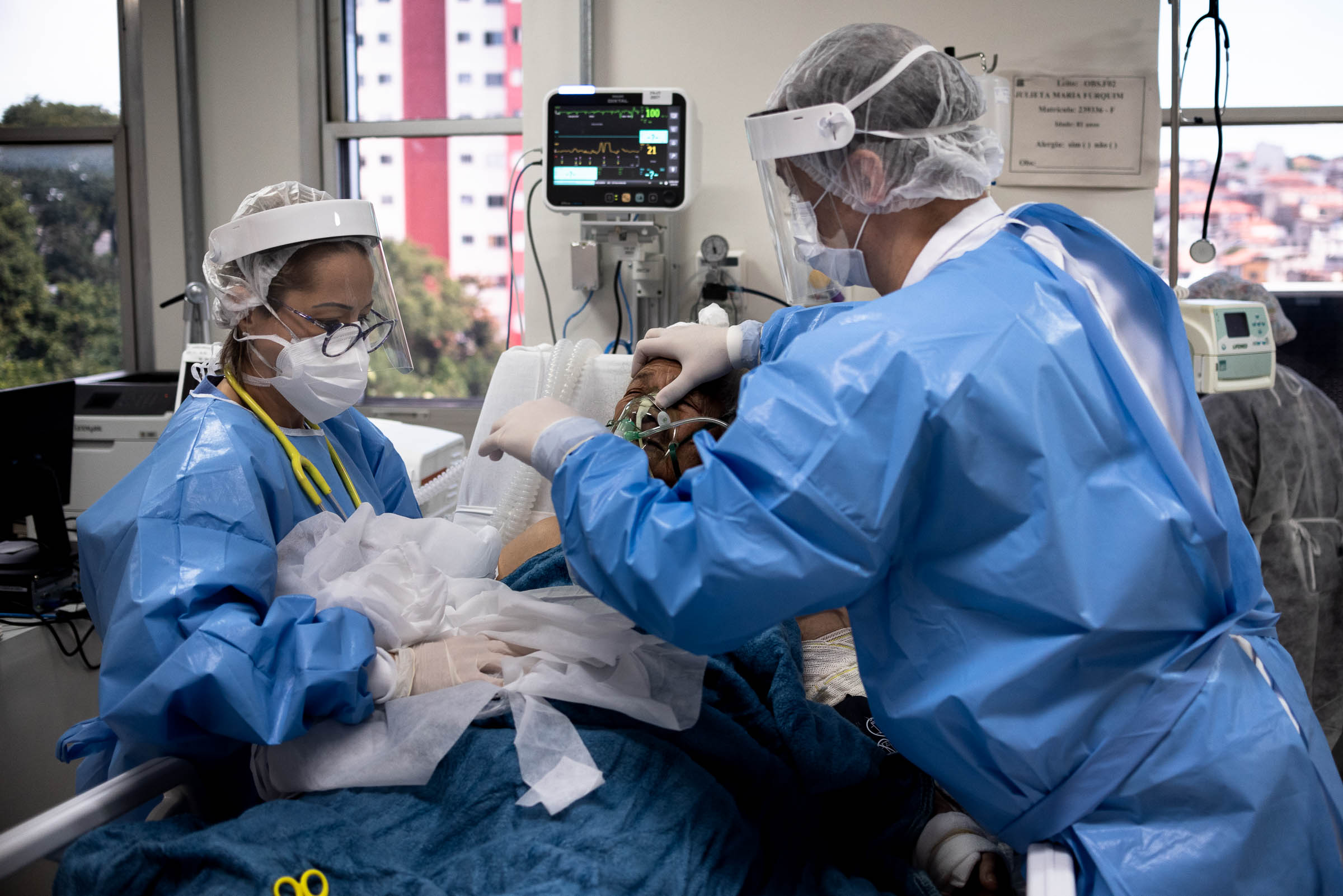
Nurses, doctors, and respiratory therapists care for a critically ill patient with COVID-19 in Brazil

Critical care nursing is the field of nursing with a focus on the utmost care of the critically ill or unstable patients following extensive injury, surgery or life-threatening diseases. Critical care nurses can be found working in a wide variety of environments and specialties, such as general intensive care units, medical intensive care units, surgical intensive care units, trauma intensive care units, coronary care units, cardiothoracic intensive care units, burns unit, paediatrics and some trauma center emergency departments. These specialists generally take care of critically ill patients who require mechanical ventilation by way of endotracheal intubation and/or titratable vasoactive intravenous medications.

== Specific jobs and personal qualities ==
Critical care nurses are also known as ICU nurses. They treat patients who are acutely ill and unstable requiring more frequent nursing assessments and the utilization of life sustaining technology and drugs. Although many ICU patients have chronic health issues, patients are in the ICU for an acute pathology or an exacerbation of a chronic pathology. ICU nurses apply their specialized knowledge base to care for and maintain the life support of critically ill patients who are often on the verge of death. On a day-to-day basis a critical care nurse will commonly, "perform assessments of critical conditions, give intensive and intervention, advocate for their patients, and operate/maintain life support systems which include mechanical ventilation via endotracheal, tracheal, or nasotracheal intubation, and titration of continuous vasoactive intravenous medications in order to maintain a mean arterial pressure that ensures adequate organ and tissue perfusion." Taking care of ICU patients is a very exhausting profession, and critical care nurses face many issues doing so. Critical care nurses tend to feel overwhelmed for various reasons experiencing strong feelings of stress and anxiety due to the workload they receive. Within such an intense work environment, critical care nurses become extremely engulfed in the workload that they sometimes are unable to take the mental breaks that they need. They are even forced to take shorter breaks at times. This interferes with their ability to properly meet the needs of certain patients. Another common issue that critical care nurses deal with is alarm fatigue, which is a lack of energy due to the loud and obnoxious alarms in a critical setting. This causes the nurses to feel irritated and can become very burdensome. Some nurses do not know how to prevent alarm fatigue, while others believe that the only way to deal with it, is to adapt to the alarms because the issue is usually ignored or overlooked. Although critical care nurses face common issues of stress and anxiety, these strong feelings can be prevented if nurses strive to obtain healthy habits and positive interactions to take care of themselves.

== Training and education ==
Critical care nurses in the U.S. are trained in advanced cardiac life support (ACLS), and many earn certification in acute and critical care nursing (CCRN) through the American Association of Critical–Care Nurses. Due to the unstable nature of the patient population, LPN/LVNs are rarely utilized in a primary care role in the intensive care unit. However, with proper training and experience LPN/LVNs can play a significant role in providing exceptional bedside care for the critically ill patient. To become a critical care nurse, one must first achieve an associate or bachelor's degree in nursing and pass the National Council Licensure Examination (NCLEX-RN). Once the exam is passed, then someone can start working as a regular registered nurse (RN). After getting hired into a critical care area, additional specialized training is usually given to the nurse. After 1750 hours of providing direct bedside care in a critical care area, a nurse can then sit for the CCRN exam. The American Association of Critical Care Nurses advisory board sets and maintains standards for critical care nurses. The certification offered by this board is known as CCRN. Depending on the hospital and State, the RN will be required to take a certain amount of continuing education hours to stay up to date with the current technologies and changing techniques.

Registration is a regulatory term for the process that occurs between the individual nurse and the state in which the nurse practices. All nurses in the US are registered as nurses without a specialty. The CCRN is an example of a post registration specialty certification in critical care. There are also variants of critical care certification test that the AACN offers to allow nurses to certify in progressive care (PCCN), cardiac medicine (CMC) and cardiac surgery (CSC). In addition, Clinical Nurse Specialists can certify in adult, neonatal and pediatric acute and critical care (CCNS). In November 2007, the AACN Certification Corporation launched the ACNPC, an advanced practice certification examination for Acute Care Nurse Practitioners . None of these certifications confer any additional practice privileges, as nursing practice is regulated by the individual's state board of nursing. These certifications are not required to work in an intensive care unit, but are encouraged by employers, as the tests for these certifications tend to be difficult to pass and require an extensive knowledge of both pathophysiology and critical care medical and nursing practices. The certification, while difficult to obtain, is looked upon by many in the field as demonstrating expertise in the field of critical care nursing, and demonstrating the individual's nurse's desire to advance their knowledge base and skill set, thereby allowing them to better care for their patients.

Intensive care nurses are also required to be comfortable with a variety of technology and its uses in the critical care setting. This technology includes such equipment as hemodynamic and cardiac monitoring systems, mechanical ventilator therapy, intra-aortic balloon pumps (IABP), ventricular assist devices (LVAD and RVAD), continuous renal replacement equipment (CRRT/CVVHDF), extracorporeal membrane oxygenation circuits (ECMO) and many other life support devices. The training for the use of this equipment is provided through a network of in-hospital inservices, manufacturer training, and hours of education time with experienced operators. Annual continuing education is required by most states in the U.S. and by many employers to ensure that all skills are kept up to date. Many intensive care unit management teams will send their nurses to conferences to ensure that the staff is kept up to the current state of this rapidly changing technology.

In Australia there is no compulsory prerequisite for critical care nurses to have postgraduate qualifications. However, the Australian minimum standard recommends that critical care nurses should obtain postgraduate qualifications. Critical care nurses must have a bachelor of nursing, be registered with the Nursing and Midwifery Board of Australia, and meet the NMBA's standards in order to work as a critical care nurse in Australia.

== Employment areas ==
Critical care nurses work in a variety of different areas, with a diverse patient population. There are many critical care nurses working in hospitals in intensive care units, post-operative care and high dependency units. They also work on medical evacuation and transport teams.

In August 2004, to demonstrate the work of critical care nurses Massachusetts General Hospital invited reporter Scott Allen and photographer Michelle McDonald from The Boston Globe to take part in an 'immersion experience' in the surgical intensive care unit (SICU). The Globe staffers spent eight months shadowing an experienced nurse and a trainee nurse to learn about nursing practice first hand. The result was a four-part, front-page series that ran from October 23 to 26, 2005, entitled Critical Care: The making of an ICU nurse.

The added psychological stress of nursing in critical care units has been well-documented, and it has been argued the stress experienced in ICU areas are unique in the profession.

== Patient interaction ==
According to Washington, no matter their specialty, all nurses must be able to build trusting relationships with their patients. When the nurses develop strong relationships between their patients they are able to obtain important information about them that may be helpful to diagnosing them. Also, family members that become involved in this relationship make it easier for the nurses to build these trusting relationships with the patients because the family members could ease any stress that could lead the patient to be timid. When a patient has a long-term illness, the good relationships built between the nurse and patient can improve the patient's quality of life.

== Subspecialities ==
Critical care nurses can specialize in several different areas based on either the patient's age or the illness/injury that the patient has. Geriatric patients are considered to be people over the age of 65 and nurses that specialize in geriatrics work in an adult intensive care unit (ICU). Pediatric patients are children under the age of 18; a nurse that works with very sick children would work in a pediatric intensive care unit (PICU). Finally, a child is considered a neonatal patient from the time they are born to when they leave the hospital. If a child is born with a life-threatening illness the child would be transferred to a neonatal intensive care unit (NICU).

Also, the location that the CCRN works can vary. Some places that they can work most commonly include hospitals: in regular or specialized intensive care units. Uncommonly they can work at some patients’ homes, in some flight centers and outpatient facilities.

The specialty areas of the critical care nurses can also be based on the patient's illness or injury. For example, a unit that is an adult intensive care unit, specialized in the care of trauma patients would be an adult trauma intensive care unit. The focus of the unit is generally on either an adult or a pediatric/neonatal population, as the treatment methods differ for the age ranges. Another example could include an intensive care unit solely to care for patients directly before and after a major or minor surgery.

== Statistics ==
Depending on the location, critical care nurses in Australia work approximately 31.7 hours a week. In South Australia critical care nurses are recorded to work approximately 28.2 hours a week. While in the Northern Territory critical care nurses have been documented to work 31.7 hours a week.

Tasmania has the largest percentage of nurses working part time with 71.8%, while the Northern Territory has the lowest with 18.4%.

== Salary ==
Critical care nurses are specialty nurses; because of this, they require more in depth and specialized training than regular RNs do. Therefore, their salaries are usually higher compared to basic RN's because of the more intense work that they do day to day. The national average salary for a CCRN is around $78,110. However, in the top percentile salaries can reach $106,630. It all depends on the job and where they are working

Critical care nurses in Australia do not need to have extra training than regular RNs do unless they have completed a postgraduate qualification. Therefore, their salaries are usually similar. Pay levels in nursing are bases on the position/level and experience. The average salary are approximately $55,617 for level 1.1, $57,841 for level 1.2, $60,155 for level 1.3, $62,561 for level 1.4, $65,063 for level 1.5, $67,666 for level 1.6, $70,373 for level 1.7, $73,187 for level 1.8, $75,488 for level 2.1, $77,028 for level 2.2, $78,600 for level 2.3 and $80,204 for level 2.4. Australian nurses receive shift loading/penalties and superannuation (approximately 10%).
