= Charles-Edward Amory Winslow =

American bacteriologist and public health expert

Charles-Edward A. Winslow
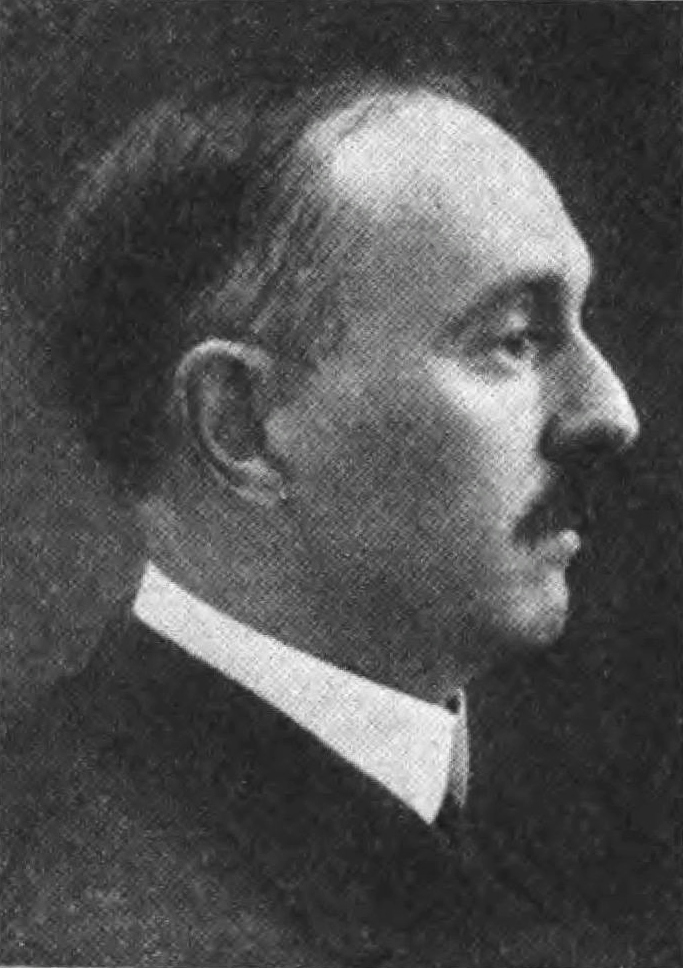
- Born: February 4, 1877; Boston, Massachusetts
- Died: January 8, 1957 (aged 79); New Haven, Connecticut
- Education: BS, Massachusetts Institute of Technology, 1898; MS, Massachusetts Institute of Technology, 1910
- Occupations: Bacteriologist, public health expert and professor at Yale University
- Known for: Founded Yale School of Public Health, 1915
- Awards: The CEA Winslow Award is named after him

Charles-Edward Amory Winslow (February 4, 1877 – January 8, 1957) was an American bacteriologist and public health expert who was, according to the Encyclopedia of Public Health, "a seminal figure in public health, not only in his own country, the United States, but in the wider Western world."

Winslow was born in Boston, Massachusetts and attended Massachusetts Institute of Technology (M.I.T.), obtaining a B.S. in 1898 and an M.S. in 1910.

He began his career as a bacteriologist. He met Anne Fuller Rogers when they were students in William T. Sedgwick's laboratory at M.I.T., and married her in 1907. He taught at the Massachusetts Institute of Technology while heading the sewage experiment station from 1908 to 1910, then taught at the College of the City of New York from 1910 to 1914.

He was the youngest charter member of the Society of American Bacteriologists when that organization was founded in 1899. With Samuel Cate Prescott he published the first American textbook on the elements of water bacteriology.

In 1915 he founded the Yale Department of Public Health within the Yale Medical School, and he was professor and chairman of the Department until he retired in 1945. (The Department became the Yale School of Public Health after accreditation was introduced in 1947.) During a time dominated by discoveries in bacteriology, he emphasized a broader perspective on causation, adopting a more holistic perspective. The department under his direction was a catalyst for health reform in Connecticut. He was the first director of Yale's J.B. Pierce Laboratory, serving from 1932 to 1957. Winslow was also instrumental in founding the Yale School of Nursing.

He was the first Editor-in-Chief of the Journal of Bacteriology, serving in that position from 1916 to 1944. He was also the editor of the American Journal of Public Health from 1944 to 1954. He was the curator of public health at the American Museum of Natural History from 1910 to 1922. In 1926 he became president of the American Public Health Association, and in the 1950s was a consultant to the World Health Organization.

== Defining public health ==
In 1920, Winslow published a widely-cited definition of public health in Science, describing the field as "the science and the art of preventing disease, prolonging life, and promoting physical health and efficiency through organized community efforts for the sanitation of the environment, the control of community infections, the education of the individual in principles of personal hygiene, the organization of medical and nursing service for the early diagnosis and preventive treatment of disease, and the development of the social machinery which will ensure to every individual in the community a standard of living adequate for the maintenance of health. [...] I look to see our health departments in the coming years organizing diverse forms of sanitary and medical and nursing and social service in such fashion as to enable every citizen to realize his birthright of health and longevity."

== CEA Winslow Award ==
The C.-E.A. Winslow Award was created by Yale University and commemorates Winslow as a pioneer in public health and medicine, who is credited with founding the second oldest school of public health in the country at Yale. Among the most widely quoted health leaders during his lifetime, Dr. Winslow believed that equal in weight with scientific ideas about health and disease was a commitment to social justice - that social ills must be the first conquest in the "conquest of epidemic disease.”

Previous winners include Peter Hotez (2024) and Kimberle Crenshaw (2023).

C.-E.A Winslow Award Recipients (1955-2015)

- 1955 - Friend Lee Mickle
- 1956 - CT PH Nursing Agencies Board
- 1957 - Ira V. Hiscock and Stanley H. Osborn
- 1958 - Elizabeth Gordon Fox
- 1959 - M. Allen Pond
- 1960 - Alfred Burgdorf
- 1961 - John R. Paul
- 1962 - Hazel V. Dudley
- 1963 - Martha Clifford
- 1964 - Louis J. Dumont
- 1965 - Leonard F. Menczer
- 1966 - Warren J. Scott
- 1967 - Franklin M. Foote
- 1968 - Edward M. Cohart
- 1969 - Leonard Parente
- 1970 - Wilbur Johnston
- 1971 - Florence Austin
- 1972 - Mrs. Chase Going Woodhouse
- 1973 - Edwin Meiss
- 1974 - James Hart
- 1975 - Barbara Christine
- 1976 - Adrian Ostfield
- 1977 - Estelle Siker
- 1978 - Fred Adams
- 1979 - J. Wister Meigs
- 1981 - Robert W. McCollum
- 1984 - I. S. Falk
- 1985 - George Silver
- 1986 - Ralph Gofstein
- 1987 - Alvin Novik
- 1988 - Martha Leonard
- 1989 - Elizabeth Bellis
- 1990 - Ruth Abbott
- 1991 - Roslyn U. Fishman
- 1992 - John Glasgow
- 1994 - Susan Addiss
- 1995 - James F. Jekel
- 1996 - Virginia S. Humphrey
- 1997 - James L. Hadler
- 1998 - Cornell Scott/Katrina Clark
- 1999 - Holger Hansen
- 2000 - Richard F. Straub
- 2001 - Marge Nelligan
- 2002 - Alfreda Turner
- 2003 - Elaine O'Keefe
- 2004 - Paul M. Shur
- 2005 - Joan Segal
- 2006 - Ruth N. Knollmueller
- 2007 - Katherine A. Kelley
- 2008 - Elaine Anderson
- 2009 - Michael J. Perlin
- 2010 - Baker Salsbury
- 2011 - Shelley Diehl Geballe
- 2012 - Patricia J. Checko
- 2014 - William G. Faraclas
- 2015 - Jeannette Ickovics
- 2016 - Debbie Humphries
- 2017 - Jennifer Kertanis

== CEA Winslow The Translator ==
In 1896, he translated, from German, « Heimat », a play in four acts by Hermann Sudermann, renamed « Magda » and played by Henry Stephenson and Charles Waldron in a Broadway theatre production in New York City, New York.

== Monographs ==
Winslow wrote nearly 600 articles and books on bacteriology, public health, sanitation, and health care administration. Among the more significant are:

- The Evolution and Significance of the Modern Public Health Campaign (1923)
- The Conquest of Epidemic Disease (1943)
- The History of American Epidemiology (1952).
