= Consensus model =

Consensus model may refer to:

- Consensus decision-making
- Consensus model (criminal justice)
- Consensus Model for APRN Regulation
