= Elizabeth Fox =

Elizabeth Fox may refer to:

- Elizabeth Fox, Baroness Holland (1771–1845), English political hostess
- Elizabeth Fox-Genovese (1941–2007), American historian
- Libby Fox, fictional character in EastEnders
- Betty Fox (1937–2011), Canadian activist
- Elizabeth Fox, Countess of Ilchester (1723–1792)
- Elizabeth Gordon Fox (1884–1948), American nurse
