= Vashti Bartlett =

American nurse (1873–1969)

Vashti Bartlett (November 15, 1873 – July 7, 1969) was an American nurse who served with the American Red Cross during World War I, and in Siberia and Manchuria after the war. She also worked in Haiti, Oklahoma, and Newfoundland on various missions.

== Early life and education ==
Vashti Rebecca Bartlett was born in Baltimore, Maryland, the daughter of George W. B. Bartlett and Amanda Griffith Bartlett. She was named for her grandmother, Vashti Robinson Bartlett. She attended the Bryn Mawr School in Baltimore, and trained as a nurse at Johns Hopkins School of Nursing, graduating in 1906. Among her instructors were Florence Sabin.

== Career ==
In 1908, Vashti Bartlett joined Wilfred Grenfell's mission to Newfoundland, and served on staff as chief nurse at St. Anthony's Hospital. She supervised nurses at Garfield Hospital in Washington, D.C., and at Watts Hospital in Durham, North Carolina, and joined Mabel Boardman's flood relief efforts in Ohio in 1913. During World War I, she was part of the Mercy Ship operation at Pau, France and La Panne in Belgium. She was assistant to Clara Dutton Noyes at Red Cross Headquarters in Washington, and served with the United States Army Nurse Corps in France towards the end of the war.

After World War I, Bartlett joined a Red Cross mission in Siberia. She was diverted to Harbin in Manchuria during a cholera outbreak, but soon established herself at the Red Cross hospital in Vladivostok, treating wounded Czechs and Russians during the Siberian Intervention. She also taught courses for local women on caring for the sick. In 1920, she was off to Haiti, where she was superintendent of nurses at a Red Cross hospital in Port-au-Prince during a smallpox epidemic.

Bartlett was in Oklahoma in 1928, as chief nurse at the Chilocco Indian Agricultural School. She retired from nursing the following year.

== Later life and legacy ==
Bartlett was retired from nursing for nearly forty years, from age 56 until her death in 1969, at age 95, in Maryland. Her papers, including letters, photographs, and handwritten journals from her various overseas assignments, are archived at Johns Hopkins. There is a virtual exhibit of objects related to Vashti Bartlett, organized by the Johns Hopkins Nurses' Alumni Association in 2003.
