= Martha N. Hill =

American nurse (born 1943)

- Born: 1943 (age 82–83); Boston, Massachusetts, US
- Spouse: Gary S. Hill (m. 1966; died 2013)

Academic background
- Education: BSN, 1966, Johns Hopkins School of Nursing; MA, nursing, University of Pennsylvania; PhD, 1986, Johns Hopkins Bloomberg School of Public Health
- Thesis: Diffusion of 1984 hypertension consensus recommendations among clinicians (1986)

Academic work
- Institutions: Johns Hopkins School of Nursing
- Doctoral students: Cheryl Dennison Himmelfarb

Martha Norton Hill (born 1943) is an American nurse. She was the Dean of the Johns Hopkins School of Nursing and Professor of Nursing, Medicine, and Public Health at Johns Hopkins University.

== Early life and education ==
Hill was born in 1943 to father Paul L. Norton in Boston, Massachusetts and raised alongside sisters Catherine and Ann. Hill completed her nursing diploma and Bachelor of Science degree from Johns Hopkins University (JHU) before enrolling at the University of Pennsylvania for her Master's degree. Upon graduating from JHU, Hill married Gary S. Hill. She returned to Johns Hopkins for her PhD and was a postdoctoral fellow through the Robert Wood Johnson Clinical Nurse Scholars Program at the University of Pennsylvania from 1986 to 1988.

== Career ==
Upon completing her post-doctoral fellowship, Hill served on the faculty of the University of Pennsylvania and also worked as a nurse specialist in hypertension. In 1980, she returned to Johns Hopkins as an assistant professor in their School of Continuing Studies’ Division of Nursing. Hill was one of the first faculty members appointed to the Johns Hopkins School of Nursing once it was established as an independent division of the university in 1985. While serving as an associate professor and director of Hopkins' Center for Nursing Research, Hill became the first non-physician president of the American Heart Association (AHA) in 1996. Prior to her promotion, she had served on AHA's Council of Affairs Committee and Nursing Council.

As a result of her academic achievements, Hill was the recipient of JHU's 1997 Distinguished Alumnus Award for outstanding personal, professional, or humanitarian achievements and elected a Member of the National Academy of Medicine. Following this, Hill was appointed Dean of the School of Nursing after serving as interim dean since July 1, 2001. While serving in this role, she led research studies on preventing and treating hypertension and oversaw NIH-funded clinical trials. In 2006, she was recognized by The Daily Record as one of Maryland's Top 100 Women. In 2010, Hill invited the Flinders University School of Nursing and Midwifery to join JHU's International Centre for Global Nursing to "facilitate the development of nursing internationally through advocacy, innovation and capacity building." She was later elected a member of the Sigma Theta Tau International Nurse Researcher Hall of Fame.

Hill stepped down as Dean of Johns Hopkins School of Nursing in 2013 to return to her faculty role as a tenured professor. In her final year as Dean, Hill was recognized by The Daily Record as a 2013 Influential Marylander as "someone who has made significant impacts in their fields and continue to be leaders in the state." Upon officially stepping down, Hill was named Dean Emerita of the school in recognition of her continuing contributions. In 2013 HIll was awarded honorary fellowship of the Royal College of Nursing. In 2016, Hill was awarded with the American Academy of Nursing's Living Legend honor.

Hill retired from Johns Hopkins University in 2017. In honor of her work at the school, JHU established the Hill Interprofessional Research Commons in her name.
