= Cheryl Dennison Himmelfarb =

American nurse practitioner

- Born: Cheryl Renee Dennison; August 30, 1969 (age 57); Fort Worth, Texas, U.S.
- Education: Texas Woman's University; Johns Hopkins School of Nursing
- Scientific career
- Workplaces: Johns Hopkins University
- Thesis: A brief substance abuse intervention for black men with high blood pressure (2001)
- Doctoral advisor: Martha N. Hill

Cheryl Renee Dennison Himmelfarb (born August 30, 1969) is an American nurse scientist and practitioner who researches cardiovascular risk, chronic illness management, and patient safety. She is the Sarah E. Allison Professor of Research and Self-Care and the vice dean for research at the Johns Hopkins School of Nursing.

== Life ==
Dennison Himmelfarb was born on August 30, 1969, in Fort Worth, Texas to Marcia and James Dennison. She completed a B.S. from the Texas Woman's University in 1991. The same year, she began working as a clinical nurse in the intensive care unit at the Baylor University Medical Center. From 1993 to 1995, she worked as a staff nurse with the American Mobile Nurses Critical Care Unit Staffing in San Diego, New York University Medical Center, Tulane Medical Center, Straub Medical Center, and MRA Staffing systems. While working as a clinical nurse in the surgical intensive care unit at the Johns Hopkins Hospital, Dennison Himmelfarb earned an M.S. in advanced practice nursing adult nurse practitioner and primary care (1996) and Ph.D. (2001) from the Johns Hopkins School of Nursing. Her dissertation was titled, A brief substance abuse intervention for black men with high blood pressure. Martha N. Hill was her doctoral advisor. From 1996 to 2001, she was a research assistant and project data manager of the "Comprehensive High Blood Pressure Care for Young Urban Black Men" study. She worked as a nurse practitioner in the Caccarone Preventative Cardiology Center from 1998 to 2001.

Dennison Himmelfarb joined the faculty at the Johns Hopkins School of Nursing in 2001. She was promoted to assistant professor in 2004 and associate professor in 2008. In 2007, she received a joint faculty appointment in the Johns Hopkins School of Medicine's division of health sciences informatics. The same year, she was elected fellow of the American Heart Association. She was elected a fellow of the American Academy of Nursing and the Preventative Cardiovascular Nurses Association in 2010. Dennison Himmelfarb became the director of the office of science and innovation at the Johns Hopkins School of Nursing in 2014. She became a professor in 2016. In 2018, Dennison Himmelfarb became the Sarah E. Allison Professor of Research and Self-Care. Since 2019, she has served as a vice president for research at the Johns Hopkins School of Nursing. She researches cardiovascular risk, chronic illness management, and patient safety.
