= Mary Opal Wolanin =

American nurse (1910 –1997)

Mary Opal Wolanin (November 1, 1910 – May 22, 1997) was an American nurse and expert in eldercare. She was one of the pioneers of gerontological nursing in the United States and conducted research on long-term care for the elderly, which “made her nationally known.” During her tenure at the University of Arizona School of Nursing, she started a graduate program in gerontological nursing, the first of its kind in the United States. She also worked for the care of Native Americans affected with tuberculosis. In 1996, she became the first Arizona nurse, who was inducted into the American Nurses Association Hall of Fame.

== Biography ==
Mary Opal Browne was born in Chrisney, Indiana, United States, on November 1, 1910, to Earl Edwin and Florence Abbott Browne. Her father's family emigrated from Germany to the U.S. in 1848. She completed her early education from grammar school at Chase Mound School in Kansas and Westphalia High School in Westphalia, Kansas. She graduated from Washington University in St. Louis. In 1931, she obtained a diploma from Municipal General Hospital School of Nursing, Kansas City, Missouri, and subsequently completed a psychiatric nursing course at Cook County Hospital, Chicago, Illinois, in 1932. She also received a Certificate in Gerontology from the University of Southern California.

She started her professional career as a nurse in 1935 at Municipal General Hospital School of Nursing, Kansas City. In 1941, she enlisted in the United States Army Nurse Corps as a second lieutenant and was stationed at Jefferson Barracks, Missouri. From 1941 to 1943, she served as a second lieutenant in the United States Army Nurse Corps. On October 29, 1942, she married second lieutenant H. J. Tiger Wolanin. After her marriage, she was honorably discharged from the service. Between 1944 and 1951, she accompanied her husband on his military assignments to different places including Mississippi, Louisiana, Ohio, Arizona, and Nebraska. She served as a civilian nurse, supervisor, and instructor. At Biloxi, Mississippi, she got the first opportunity to teach as an instructor in the Cadet Nursing Program.

Following her husband's retirement from military, she joined the faculty of the University of Arizona School of Nursing. She later completed her MSN degree at the University of Arizona in 1963. She eventually became an associate professor, a position she held until her retirement in 1987.

In 1972, she began to study needs of nursing homes and long-term care for the elderly in Arizona after receiving an appointment with the newly established Regional Medical Program in Arizona. Throughout her career, she also worked in improving the nursing care of people suffering from dementia. She was also associated with the establishment of the American Nurses Association's gerontological program (1966), and the National Gerontological Nursing Association (1984).

She was conferred an honorary doctorate degree (DSc) by the University of Arizona in 1986.

To recognize her contributions in the field of nursing, in 1996, she was inducted into the American Nurses Hall of Fame.

She died in San Antonio on May 22, 1997, of “respiratory failure.”
