= Western Schools =

Western Schools is a company based in Ormond Beach, Florida, US, that provides continuing education programs to health care professionals. The company was founded in 1979 and was a division of Specialty Commerce Corp. until August, 2018, when it was bought by Colibri Group.

Western Schools currently offers home study continuing education for the following health care professions: Nursing, Dentistry, Dental Hygiene, Dental Assisting, Occupational Therapy, Physical Therapy, Respiratory Care Therapy, Social Work, Marriage and Family Therapy, Counseling, Psychology, Pharmacy, Speech-Language Pathology, Dietetics.

== Nursing ==
Western Schools is accredited as a provider of continuing nursing education by the American Nurses Credentialing Center's (ANCC) Commission on Accreditation.

== Dentistry ==
Western Schools is an ADA CERP Recognized Provider. ADA CERP is a service of the American Dental Association to assist dental professionals in identifying quality providers of continuing dental education.

== Social work ==
Western Schools, provider # 1147, is approved as a provider for social work continuing education by the Association of Social Work Boards (ASWB), through the Approved Continuing Education (ACE) program.

== Counselors ==
Western Schools has been approved by NBCC as an Approved Continuing Education Provider, ACEP No. 6257.
