= Sarah Szanton =

American nurse practitioner and nursing school dean

Academic background
- Education: BA, 1988, Harvard University; BSN, Johns Hopkins School of Nursing; MSN, 1998, University of Maryland; PhD, Johns Hopkins University

Academic work
- Institutions: Johns Hopkins School of Nursing

Sarah Loeb Szanton is an American nurse practitioner who focuses on geriatric nursing research. As of 2021, she is the Dean of the Johns Hopkins School of Nursing.

== Early life and education ==
Szanton was born in Washington, D.C., in 1966 and raised mostly in Washington, D.C., the youngest of three children. In 1984 she graduated from the Sidwell Friends School, a Quaker school in Washington. Her parents, Peter Szanton and Eleanor Stokes Szanton encouraged their children to be public-spirited. Peter was a private consultant to non-profits and the former President of the New York office of the Rand Corporation. Eleanor was the executive director of the advocacy group Zero to Three.

Szanton completed her Bachelor of Arts at Harvard University in 1988 and her Bachelors of Science in Nursing from the Johns Hopkins School of Nursing. She left JHU to attend the University of Maryland for her Masters of Science in Nursing in 1998 before returning to JHU for her PhD.

== Career ==
Following her PhD, Szanton worked as a nurse practitioner working with elderly patients in West Baltimore. She eventually joined the faculty at Johns Hopkins School of Nursing where she focused on promoting the health of low-income minority older adults. In 2008, Szanton received funding to systematically evaluate health outcomes of ElderSHINE (Support, Honor, Inspire, Nurture, Evolve) by comparing 25 new participants randomly assigned to intervention or to social support control groups on behavioral, social and biological measures. Szanton was later the recipient of the 2009-2011 John A. Hartford Foundation Claire M. Fagin Fellowship in geriatric nursing research.

In 2011, Szanton established Community Aging in Place—Advancing Better Living for Elders (CAPABLE) to "determine effect size and acceptability of a multicomponent behavior and home repair intervention for low-income disabled older adults." In 2014, it received federal funding to run a three-year trial prior to being offered nationally to all Medicaid recipients under a provision of the Affordable Care Act. As a result of her research, Szanton was elected a member of the American Academy of Nursing and appointed director of Johns Hopkins Nursing PhD program. In 2016, Szanton was named one of the top 50 "2016 Influencers in Aging" by Next Avenue, a digital publication covering issues for older Americans.

While serving in these roles, in 2017, Szanton was named director of the Johns Hopkins School of Nursing Center for Innovative Care in Aging. Following this, she was named an American Academy of Nursing Edge Runner in honor of her research that improves health, impact cost, and influence policy. Prior to the 2018–19 academic year, Szanton was appointed the Endowed Professor in Health Equity and Social Justice. At the conclusion of the winter semester, Szanton was also inducted into the Sigma Theta Tau International Honor Society of Nursing 2019 International Nurse Researcher Hall of Fame.

During the COVID-19 pandemic, Szanton advocated for better care for the elderly living in nursing homes. In 2021, she was appointed Dean of Johns Hopkins School of Nursing after stepping down from the School of Nursing Dean Search Committee. Szanton was later elected a member of the National Academy of Medicine for "pioneering new approaches to reducing health disparities among low-income older adults."
