= Azita Emami (nurse) =

- Born: Iran
- Education: Karolinska Institute; Red Cross University College of Nursing
- Scientific career
- Workplaces: University of Washington; Seattle University

Azita Emami is a Linda Koch Lorimer Professor and the Dean of Nursing at Yale School of Nursing since 2023. She is the former Robert G. and Jean A. Reid Dean of Nursing at the University of Washington from 2018 to 2023. She is also a Fellow of the American Academy of Nursing.

== Early life and education ==
Emami was born in Iran and emigrated to Sweden as a child. She earned a bachelor's degree at the Karolinska Institute in 1993 and a master's degree from the Red Cross University College of Nursing in 1994. She completed a doctorate at Karolinska Institute in 2000. After earning her doctorate degree, Emami remained at the Karolinska Institute as a postdoctoral fellow. She was made an associate professor in 2001.

== Career ==
Emami was made Professor at the Karolinska Institute in 2006, where she specialised in the care of the elderly. She studied the experiences of Iranian immigrants in Sweden. She also looked at student nurses' experience of cross-cultural care.

Emami served as Dean of the School of Nursing at Seattle University from 2008. Here she emphasised the importance of excellent teaching and clinical practise, as well as focussing on student experiences. She launched a curriculum review in 2011, achieving the reaccreditation of the Seattle University College of Nursing.

She was elected the Dean of Nursing at the University of Washington in 2013. The School of Nursing had struggled with low morale and a lack of trust for several years. She established the Center for Global Health Nursing at the University of Washington in 2016. In 2018 she launched a multi-disciplinary training program for nurses, providing social justice and practical skills to achieve health equity.

Emami is on the editorial board of the Journal of Global Qualitative Nursing Research. She is a member of the American Academy of Nursing Expert Panel on Global Nursing & Health. She was selected as one of the most influential Deans of Nursing in the United States. Emami also serves on the board of directors of the National Institute of Nursing Research. She has written about the need for diversity in doctoral education, and serves on the Diversity and Inclusion Advisory Group of the American Association of Colleges of Nursing.

== Honours and awards ==
In 2025 she was awarded honorary fellowship of the Royal College of Nursing
