= Yale School of Nursing =

Nursing school of Yale University

Coordinates: 41.2995°N 72.9303°W

- Coat of arms of the school
- Type: Private
- Established: 1923
- Location: Orange, Connecticut, Connecticut, U.S.
- Dean: Azita Emami
- Website: nursing.yale.edu

The Yale School of Nursing (YSN) is the nursing school of Yale University, established in 1923 in New Haven, Connecticut. In 2013, YSN moved to Yale University's West Campus, located in Orange and West Haven, Connecticut.

== Academics ==
Degrees offered include the Doctor of Nursing Practice (DNP), Doctor of Philosophy (PhD) in Nursing, and the Master of Science in Nursing (MSN) degree. Yale's nursing doctoral program began as a Doctor of Nursing Science program in 1994, later converted to a PhD program. The DNP degree has two tracks: Post-Master's Clinical Practice and Healthcare Leadership, Systems, and Policy. Yale describes both DNP tracks as three-year, part-time, post-master's programs that combine online coursework with on-campus experiences. The doctoral program (PhD) is typically completed in four to five years of full-time study.

In 2017, the master's program was redesigned to emphasize quality, social justice, population health, diversity and inclusiveness, and health equity and disparities.

The school of nursing offers degrees in several Nurse Practitioner (NP) specialties such as Family NP, Adult-Gerontology Primary/Acute Care NP, Pediatric Primary/Acute Care NP, Psychiatric-Mental Health NP, Women's Health NP, and Nurse-Midwifery. Yale's Nurse-Midwifery specialty program is fully accredited by the Accreditation Commission for Midwifery Education (ACME).

The school has the Graduate Entry Prespecialty in Nursing (GEPN) program, which is intended for students with a non-nursing bachelor's degree to directly become APRNs.The program is approved by the State of Connecticut Board of Examiners for Nursing. Yale describes the GEPN program as an accelerated, three-year program that combines pre-licensure nursing preparation with advanced specialty study in a chosen practice area, leading to a MSN degree. Yale also notes that students who already hold a registered nurse license can complete the master’s education in two academic years as full-time students.

Joint degree programs are available with Yale School of Public Health (MSN/MPH) and Yale Divinity School (MSN/MA). In addition to degree programs, YSN offers pre and post-doctoral research training and post-master's APRN certificates in five areas: Adult/Gerontology Acute Care Nurse Practitioner, Family Nurse Practitioner, Pediatric Nurse Practitioner-Acute Care, Pediatric Nurse Practitioner-Primary Care, and Psychiatric-Mental Health Nurse Practitioner.

== History ==
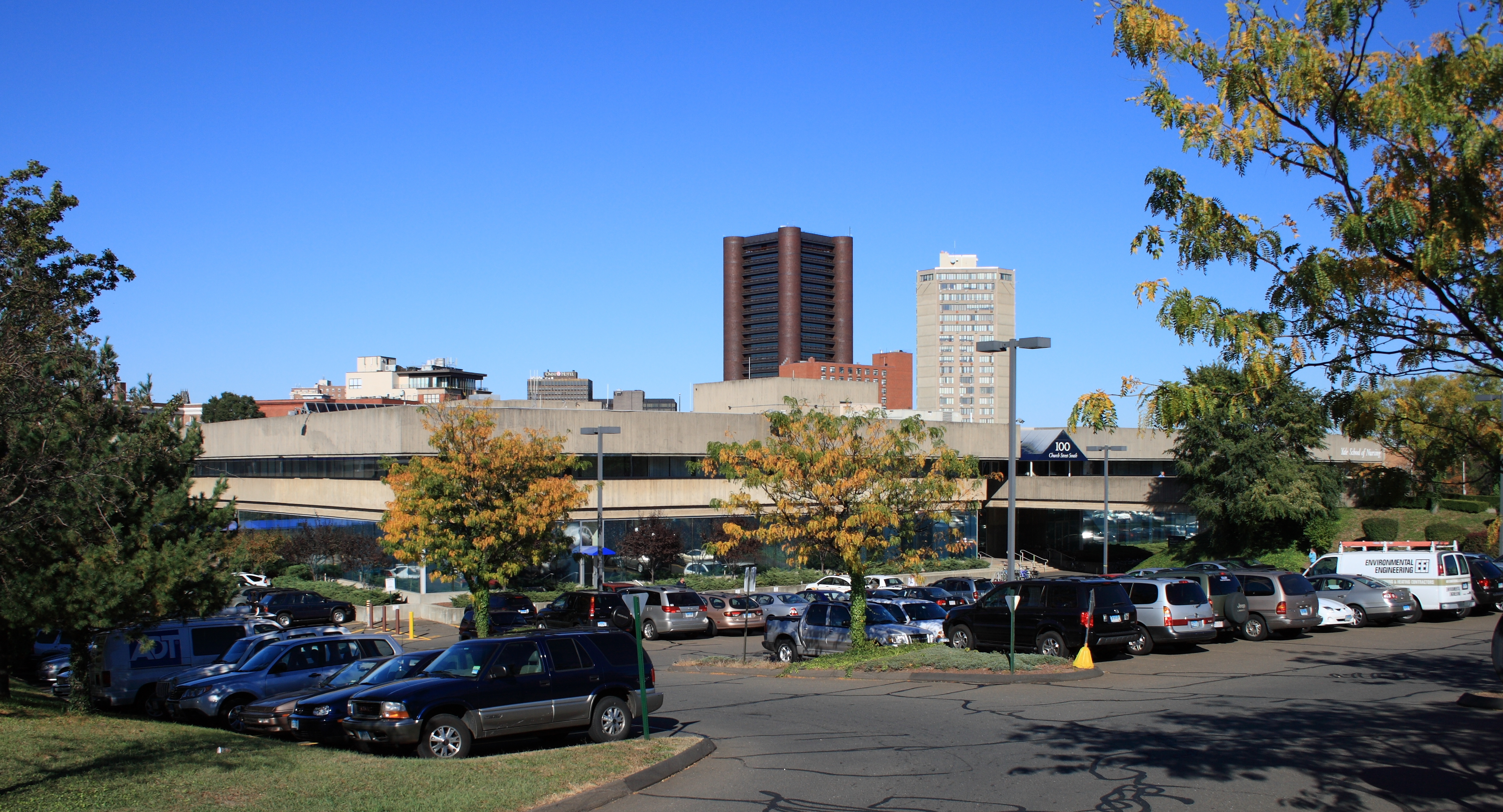
Former campus of the Yale School of Nursing in The Hill

The Yale School of Nursing was founded in 1923 with funding from the Rockefeller Foundation. The Yale School of Nursing was the first School of Nursing to adopt the strong professional standards from the Goldmark Report of 1923 which it had sponsored with the Rockefeller Foundation to determine the best form of nurse training in 1918. It had its own Dean, faculty, budget and required a standardized degree. Annie Warburton Goodrich was appointed the first Dean of YSN and was the first woman Dean at Yale University.

In 1934, bachelor's degrees were required for admission and Yale Corporation authorized the Master of Nursing degree. This program, allowing students with no prior background in nursing graduate entry, would continue until 1956 when the Master of Science in Nursing (MSN) program began. The MSN required students to have a prior background in nursing in order to gain entry into the program. The Nurse Practitioner track within the MSN degree was established in 1971 with the offering of the Pediatric Nurse Practitioner specialty. This was expanded in 1972, when the Family Nurse Practitioner specialty began. By 1975 YSN offered 10 specialty programs and tracks, and was at the vanguard of the education of nurse practitioners at the graduate level along with clinical nurse specialists and nurse-midwives. In 1974, YSN reopened admission for students with no prior background in nursing through its Three-Year Program for Non-Nurse College Graduates (later called the GEPN program).

During the 1990s, the school expanded its doctoral programs. In 1994 it began offering a Doctor of Nursing Science (DNS) program. In 2006, this program was converted to a Doctor of Philosophy (PhD) in Nursing degree, which was awarded through Yale’s Graduate School of Arts and Sciences. In the following decade, the school further expanded its advanced practice education by launching a Doctor of Nursing Practice (DNP) degree program in 2012. In 2013, the school moved from the New Haven campus to the West Campus of Yale University (in West Haven/Orange, Connecticut). In the early 2020s, the school implemented several institutional initiatives, such as expanding equity and inclusion efforts and introducing new program formats. In 2023, the Yale School of Nursing launched its first hybrid and online degree programs with the introduction of a part-time Psychiatric-Mental Health Nurse Practitioner program that combines online coursework with in-person clinical training. In 2026, the school reported substantial enrollment growth in its MSN program, which increased by 65.3% between the 2022 and 2026. A report by the Yale Daily News documented the negative effects of this expansion on classroom capacity, simulation laboratory resources, and clinical learning opportunities.

== Rankings ==
The school is among the top 20 graduate nursing schools in the country, according to the latest rankings by U.S. News & World Report (2024). In addition to the top 20 tier overall ranking, the school's Advanced Practice Nursing specialties in Psychiatric-Mental Health and Adult-Gerontology Primary Care had the fifth highest scores nationally as ranked by peer institutions. Yale's School of Nursing remains among the most selective in the nation, with only 20% of applicants estimated to be accepted.

== Deans ==
- Annie W. Goodrich (1923–1934)
- Effie Jane Taylor (1934–1944)
- Elizabeth Seelye Bixler Torrey (1944–1959)
- Florence Schorske Wald (1959–1966)
- Margaret Gene Arnstein (1967–1972)
- Donna Kaye Diers (1972–1984)
- Judith Belliveau Krauss (1985–1998)
- Catherine L. Gilliss (1998–2004)
- Margaret Grey (2005–2015)
- Ann Kurth (2016–2023)
- Azita Emami (2023–present)

== Notable faculty ==
- Lucy Conant – Early faculty member associated with Yale’s formative nursing education programs.
- Donna Diers – Former dean of the Yale School of Nursing and nationally influential leader in nursing policy, workforce reform, and health services research.
- James Dickoff - Co-developer of theoretical work on nursing practice disciplines with Patricia James
- Rhetaugh Graves Dumas – Scholar in nursing education and organizational leadership; served as dean at multiple major universities.
- Elizabeth Gordon Fox – Nursing educator and scholar associated with Yale School of Nursing during its mid-century development.
- Annie W. Goodrich – Founding dean of the Yale School of Nursing and a central figure in the professionalization of university-based education; first woman dean at Yale University.
- Virginia Avenel Henderson – Nursing theorist; developed the “Henderson Theory” and the 14 basic needs framework for nursing practice.
- Patricia James – Co-author of foundational theoretical work on nursing practice disciplines with James Dickoff.
- Tish Knobf – Leading researcher in cancer survivorship and women’s health; former president of the Oncology Nursing Society.
- Mark Lazenby – Scholar in palliative care ethics and global health nursing, with international teaching and research activity.
- Ruth McCorkle – Internationally recognized pioneer in oncology and palliative care nursing; founding director of the Yale Cancer Center’s symptom research program; member of the National Academy of Medicine.
- Douglas Olsen – Nursing educator and associate director of the Center for Health Policy and Ethics at Yale University.
- Ida Jean Orlando - Developed the Orlando Theory of the Nursing Process, which influenced nurse-patient interaction models and clinical reasoning.
- Florence Schorske Wald – Founder of the modern hospice movement in the United States and founder of the first U.S. hospice; internationally recognized leader in end-of-life care.
- Ernestine Wiedenbach – Nursing theorist and foundational leader in nurse-midwifery education; author of Clinical Nursing: A Helping Art.
- Helen Varney Burst – Internationally recognized nurse-midwifery leader and longtime editor of Varney’s Midwifery, a definitive textbook in the field.
- Loren Fields – Nursing scholar and lecturer with contributions to professional nursing education.
