= Rhetaugh Graves Dumas =

Rhetaugh Etheldra Graves Dumas (1928–2007) was an American nurse, professor, and health administrator. Dumas was the first Black woman to serve as a dean at the University of Michigan. She served as the dean of the University of Michigan Nursing School. She also served as deputy director of the National Institute of Mental Health, becoming the first nurse, female, or African-American to hold that position. She is said to have been the first nurse to use the scientific method to conduct experiments that evaluated nursing practices.

Dumas died on July 22, 2007, of ovarian cancer.

== Early life ==
Rhetaugh Etheldra Graves was born in Natchez, Mississippi. Dumas' mother wanted to become a nurse, but no local nursing schools admitted African-American students at the time and her family could not afford to send her to college further away.

When Dumas spoke at the Columbia University 2003 commencement for health sciences graduates, she said "From infancy, I was told that when I grew up, I was going to be a nurse, not just an ordinary nurse, mind you, but one who would be admired by people all around the country -- not only for her personal achievements, but more importantly, for her contributions toward improving the welfare of others."

She obtained her nursing degree at Dillard University in New Orleans in 1951. Following graduation, she took her first jobs as a substitute teacher in Natchez and as the Nurse Director of Dillard University's Student Health Center.

== Career ==
Dumas earned a master's degree in nursing in 1961 from Yale School of Nursing and joined the school's faculty, ultimately becoming an associate professor and the chair of psychiatric nursing. While at Yale, she served as a member of the Board of Public School Education in New Haven and helped mental health professionals get involved with parents and students during the school riots of the 1960s. She worked simultaneously as Director of Nursing at the Connecticut Mental Health Center and as Chair of the Yale Department of Psychiatric Nursing.

Beginning in the 1970s, Dumas held leadership positions with the National Institute of Mental Health. She was the chief of the organization's Psychiatric Nursing Education Branch. Between 1979 and 1981, she was the first nurse, female, or African-American to serve as the deputy director of the NIMH. In 1979 she was appointed by Patricia Roberts Harris, secretary of Health and Human Services, to the position of deputy director. During her time at the NIMH, according to her obituary in Nursing Outlook, she "played a major role in redirecting professional training to meet the needs of the unserved and underserved, a policy focus that continues to this day." While at NIMH, Dumas earned a doctoral degree from Union Institute.

Dumas worked for the University of Michigan for over 20 years, and she served three terms there as the nursing school dean. Dumas was the first Black female dean at Michigan, but left the position when she was appointed Vice Provost for Health and the Lucille Cole Professor of Nursing.

Dumas served terms as president of the American Academy of Nursing and the National League for Nursing. She was a member of the Institute of Medicine and a fellow of the A.K. Rice Institute. She received a presidential appointment to the National Bioethics Advisory Committee and she was awarded the President's 21st Century Award from the National Women's Hall of Fame. She was a Charter Fellow of the American Academy of Nursing and was named a Living Legend by the academy in 2002. Dumas received honorary doctorates from the University of Cincinnati, University of San Diego, Yale University and Dillard University. She gave the keynote address at the 1998 conference of the American Association for the History of Nursing in Mississippi.

Her published work includes "The Effect of Nursing Care on Postoperative Vomiting" and "Dilemmas of Black Females in Leadership."

Dumas died of cancer in a Houston hospice on July 22, 2007.

== Legacy ==
The University of Michigan Academic Women's Caucus issues the Rhetaugh G. Dumas Progress in Diversifying Award for "notable progress by academic units in achieving concurrent ethnic/racial and gender diversity in the faculty." Michigan and Yale have both established endowed chairs in their nursing schools in her name.

== See also ==
- List of Living Legends of the American Academy of Nursing
