= Gerontological nursing =

Specialty of nursing pertaining to older adults

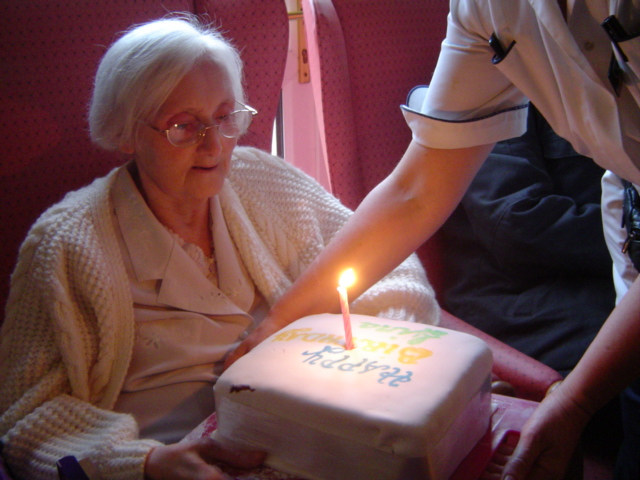
Woman in a residential care home receiving a birthday cake

Gerontological nursing is the specialty of nursing pertaining to older adults. Gerontological nurses work in collaboration with older adults, their families, and communities to support healthy aging, maximum functioning, and quality of life. The term gerontological nursing, which replaced the term geriatric nursing in the 1970s, is seen as being more consistent with the specialty's broader focus on health and wellness, in addition to illness.

Gerontological nursing is important to meet the health needs of an aging population. Due to longer life expectancy and declining fertility rates, the proportion of the population that is considered old is increasing. Between 2000 and 2050, the number of people in the world who are over age 60 is predicted increase from 605 million to 2 billion. The proportion of older adults is already high and continuing to increase in more developed countries. In 2010, seniors (aged 65 and older) made up 13% and 23% of the populations of the US and Japan, respectively. By 2050, these proportions will increase to 21% and 36%.

== Scope ==
Gerontology nursing focuses on older atients. This population has more comorbidities such as high blood pressure, diabetes, and heart conditions. Each patient requires complex care to fulfill their needs. Nurses are to be mindful of their long history for individualized care. Nurses use evidence-based practice in their care to educate and promote well-being in gerontological population. Professional nursing involves the use of culturally-competent care combined with scientific research to deliver clinical expertise.

Geriatric nurses are expected to be skilled in patient care, treatment planning, education, mental health, and rehabilitation. They also take on many roles in the workplace. The main responsibility is as a caregiver. They can also be advocates, counselors, and educators for their patients.

Gerontological nursing draws on knowledge about complex factors that affect the health of older adults. Older adults are more likely than younger adults to have one or more chronic health conditions, such as diabetes, cardiovascular disease, cancer, arthritis, hearing impairment, or a form of dementia such as Alzheimer's disease. As well, drug metabolism changes with aging, adding to the complexity of health needs.

There are many issues that arise as people age, which includes but are not limited to vision loss, hearing loss, dental issues, incontinence, and increased risk for falls. Gerontological nursing is complex and requires extensive interventions to keep the elderly safe. Nurses must be able to accommodate their patients for the vision loss, hearing loss, and dental issues. Elderly people with poor vision can be given reading materials with larger font, be provided with magnifying glasses, and brighter lighting. Interventions for hearing loss include finding a quiet place to talk among each other, speaking louder but not shouting, facing the person, speaking clearly, and providing gestures. Nursing may need to provide patients with dentures if teeth are missing to assist the patient in chewing their food. Incontinence care is crucial to preventing skin breakdown and skin infections such as candida albicans. Providing frequent incontinence care at least every two hours and skin barrier protection can decrease the chance of skin breakdown. Falls can cause fractures, hospitalizations, injuries, loss of independence, and possibly death. Many precautions can be implemented in preventing falls. Precautions include the elderly working with physical therapy to strengthen muscles and improve balance, wearing supportive shoes, making sure the environment is conducive to safety such as reducing clutter on the floor and the floor is dry, ensuring the room is well lit, and other interventions.

Gerontological nurses work in a variety of settings, including acute care hospitals, rehabilitation, nursing homes (also known as long-term care homes and skilled nursing facilities), assisted living facilities, retirement homes, community health agencies, and the patient's home. The conditions of the geriatric patient's health determines what type of facility one should reside in. Assisted living facilities are also known as senior retirement homes, and they provide care services depending on health conditions. Skilled nursing, otherwise known as a nursing home, is a place where they can reside and get provided with 24/7 cares. Older adults have been referred to as "the core business of healthcare" by gerontological nursing experts. Population aging and the complexity of health care needs of some older adults means that older adults are more likely than younger people to use health care services. In many settings, the majority of patients are older adults. Thus, experts recommend that all nurses, not only those identified as gerontological nurses, need specialized knowledge about older adults. This position was endorsed by 55 US nursing specialty organizations.

Including, GAPNA (formerly NCGNP) which was founded in 1981, by a group of Gerontological Nurse Practitioners with the intention of offering the first continuing education conferences designed specifically to meet the needs of advanced practice nurses providing care for older adults. Currently, GAPNA represents the interests of all advanced practice nurses who work with older adults. These advance practice nurses are active in a variety of settings across the continuum including primary, acute, post-acute and long-term care. GAPNA an organization for advanced practice nurses seeking continuing education in gerontological care as well as networking and peer support from experienced clinicians.

=== What Attracts Nurses to Gerontological Care ===
In the United States, caring for the elderly is predicted to be the quickest developing employment area in health care. The demand for nurses is high in geriatrics, however the nurses who are interested in geriatrics are low. Studies have found that less than 1% of nurses are certified in geriatrics and less than 3% of advanced practice nurses are certified in geriatrics. A qualitative, descriptive study was conducted by Negad (2017), it was found that to attract more nurse's higher compensation and health insurance should be offered. Nurses should have safe working conditions, onsite training and education, support from administration, flexible scheduling and sign on bonuses.

The last few decades have brought in more interest in older people as their numbers in society grow. More people than ever before are surviving to their senior years which substantially makes the demand for more working nurses in gerontology. Viewing aging as a natural process also develops more positive attitudes towards working with older adults. Gerontology study is becoming an important field in nursing and this is due to the increasing population of older adults. This increase requires an educated nursing staff who equipped to provide care to the needs of this growing aging population. There is a negative attitude towards old age and this bias can invoke negative feelings leading to great anxiety in many. Due to this prejudice, many fail to see the benefits and the opportunities that old age brings, focusing only on the challenges of old age. Gerontology educates people about old age and other issues that affect older adults. This field of study is important as it educates the public about the beauty of old age and it also encourages those advancing in age to embrace this change. Knowledge about the aging process not only helps people to understand the aging process but it also assists in helping older adults to achieve a better quality of life.

Implementation of geriatric education in nursing is crucial in increasing the number of nurses who pursue a specialty in geriatrics. Not only should nursing school programs focus on the care of the geriatric population, but also education should be available on-site at facilities caring for the elderly. Nurse Educators and Nurse Leaders are important roles that can be beneficial in the nursing home environment. Nurse leaders play a critical role in mediating between owners-managers and facility staff, and are also keenly aware of the need for geriatrics training among staff. Geriatric training for nurses and nursing assistants can increase quality of patient care and improve employee retention rates in the nursing home environment.

=== Gerontology vs Geriatrics ===
The terms Gerontology and Geriatrics are often used interchangeably, but there are differences between the two. Gerontology is the study of the social, cultural, psychological, cognitive, and biological aspects of ageing. Geriatrics, or geriatric medicine, is a specialty that focuses on health care of elderly people.

Gerontological Nurses need to know how to care for illnesses that affect the aging, the other factors affect aging, and how these impact people.

== History ==
Gerontological nurses walk a tight rope stretching across the centuries from the past to the present that introduced the notion that those who entered could survive and recover. The modern hospital is an 18th century innovation and those who entered were youths with acute injuries rather than chronic illnesses heavily seen in modern society. Beginning in the 1980s, nurse researchers have pursued answers on older adults about their well-being, and those suffering from serious chronic conditions.Bowers2020/> The NIH played a powerful role in the advancement of geriatric nursing science in the 1980s and 1990s, since then the NIH has funding nurse investigators who are transforming understanding of gerontological nursing. Although nurses published articles about care of older adults as early as 1904, the specialty of gerontological nursing emerged beginning in the 1950s, with the publication of the first gerontological nursing textbook. Pioneers in the field of gerontological nursing include Vera McIver, Doris Schwartz, Mary Opal Wolanin.

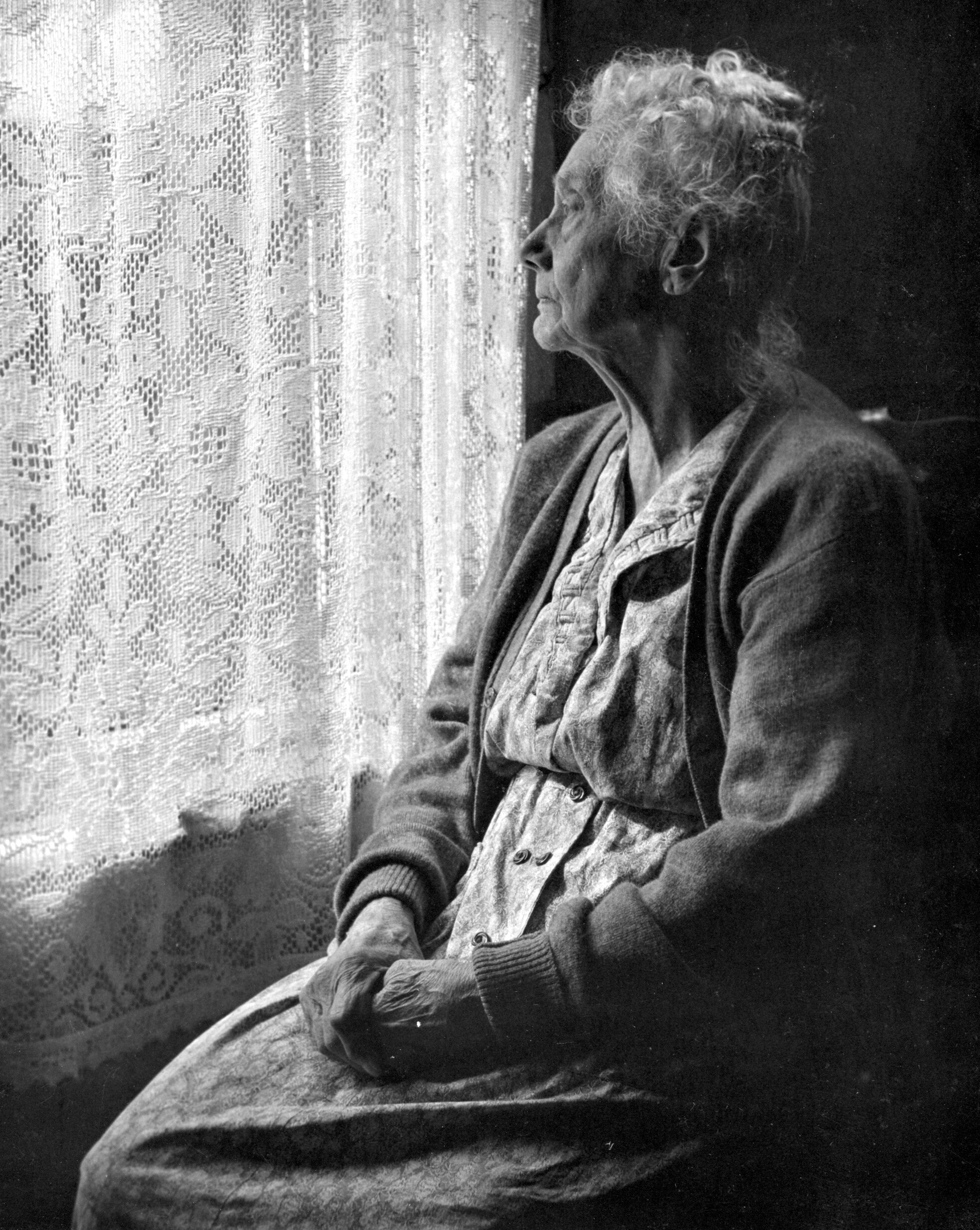
Elderly woman

A geriatric nursing specialty group was formed by the American Nurses Association in 1966, with the name changed to the Gerontological Nursing Division in 1976. In the US, the National Gerontological Nursing Association was founded in 1984 and in 1985 the Canadian Gerontological Nursing Association was founded. Standards of practice for gerontological nursing were published by the American Nurses Association in 1971. In the US, certification for geriatric nurse practitioners and clinical specialists were available in 1984.

The specialty has advanced significantly since the 1990s through large scale education and practice development initiatives funded by the John A. Hartford Foundation, including the Hartford Institute for Geriatric Nursing at New York University. Significant efforts to enhance nursing education have been made in the last decade. In 2010, the American Association of Colleges of Nursing and the Hartford Institute for Geriatric Nursing published the Recommended Baccalaureate Competences and Curricular Guidelines for the Nursing Care of Older Adults. Between 2007 and 2009 the Geriatric Nursing Education Consortium created teaching tools and trained educators in the US to improve gerontological content in nursing education.

A few initiatives that were taken to improve gerontological care is "The Nurse Competence in Aging" project which focused on providing grants and assistance to over 50 specialty nursing organizations and provided nurses with a free online gerontological nursing resource center. This resource center can be assessed using the computer, an iPAD, or iPhone applications. The resource center provides nurses with the opportunity to review evidenced based articles to learn about how to care for the older adult.

Another resource that was developed in 2009 was the Sigma Theta Tau's center for Nursing Excellence in Long-Term Care. The Geriatric Nursing Leadership Academy was sponsored by Sigma Theta and it provided products and services to support nurse's ability to grow professionally and become great leaders.

=== Gerontological Nursing Research ===
Research has been a huge part of the nursing field due to the ever-so changing technology and procedures. In the early days of nursing research, 1930–1960, the main focus was on identifying the components of nursing care that influenced patient recovery and the nursing skills required for positive patient outcomes. A writer in 1956 requested that nurses refocus their research to include major health issues of the time and how to support the frail elderly. In the 1990s, research focus was put on how pain affected the daily lives of older adults. This research lead to improve pain identification and treatment across settings.

In today's world individuals are living longer. According to the United Nations World Populations Prospect (2020), the average life expectancy is 78.93 years which is a 0.16% increase since 2018. With the elderly population becoming more popular, there is a crucial need for gerontological nursing research. The older patient has more comorbidities and different mental health issues that affect their daily living activities. American Senior Communities (2020) lists the ten biggest health conditions the elderly deal with, being heart and respiratory diseases, cognitive decline, gait and transferring issues, oral health complications, as well as osteoporosis and osteoarthritis.

Falls in the elderly are the leading cause of injury and mortality in America. Nursing research shows that there is a continued need for education to help decrease patient falls. Gerontological nursing includes educating the elderly patient to be honest in discussing falls with medical professionals, using ambulatory aids, having adequate footwear and adequate lighting when ambulating. Doing medication checks with any new prescriptions can help to reduce side effects that can cause a fall in the elderly. Bowers (2020) states that falls are one common area gerontological nursing research needs to focus on to continue to improve quality of life in the older patient.

The community health nurse has a role of education in the area of gerontological nursing research. The older client has areas in the community such as the local senior center, where they can have their blood sugar and blood pressure checked. There are community centers where the elderly patient can receive their influenza and pneumococcal vaccines. The community health nurse is crucial to providing much needed services to the vulnerable older population. Research shows that providing quick available healthcare services to the elderly can help to decrease negative patient outcomes for the older patient.

When it comes to managing care of older adults, it's important to properly assess their needs and correlate any associating risk factors. Also, healthcare providers need to ensure that all needs are met in order to ensure overall patient satisfaction. In an attempt to do this, it is recommended that healthcare organizations implement the use of the Transitional Care Model (TCM), which is designed to enhance continuity of care and ultimately improve patient outcomes.

The TCM is an intervention nurses primarily use in conjunction with the collaboration of patients and their families as well as members of associating healthcare disciplines. There are multiple components linked to this model which include the screening of patients, nurse staffing, maintaining relationships with patients and their caregivers, assessing and managing risks and symptoms and providing education leading to the promotion of self-management. When implemented in practice, the TCM has had findings wherein there were fewer reports of patients being rehospitalized, leading to a decrease in overall healthcare costs (Hirschman et al., 2015).

== Training and education ==
Gerontological nursing includes generalist and specialist practice. A generalist is a registered nurse or Licensed Practical Nurse. A gerontological nurse specialist is an advanced practice nurse or nurse practitioner who has graduate education in gerontological nursing.

Specific education in gerontological care is important for all nurses, even those who work outside of long-term care, because older adults make up a significant portion of patients across specialties. However, additional certification in Gerontological care is uncommon for registered nurses, with less than 1% being certified. Fewer than 3% of advance practice nurses in the United States have this certification.

Registered nurses have the option of becoming certified in gerontological nursing. National nursing organizations such as the American Nurses Credentialing Center and the Canadian Nurses Association offer certification in gerontological nursing. Requirements for maintaining certification vary. The American Nurses Credentialing Center lists requirements as including 2 years experience as an RN, 2,000 hours of clinical experience and 30 hours of continuing education, both within the specialty of gerontological nursing. Post graduate certificates in gerontological nursing are also available by completing continuing education courses through colleges and universities.

Gerontological nursing is often ignored within baccalaureate educational programs, with only 1/3rd of all schools requiring a specific course in geriatrics. This is due to educational programs focusing more attention on the sick rather than the well, who are more representative of the older population. Many nursing programs that do not have specific gerontological courses have instead integrated this content into the existing curriculum. 1/4th of all nursing programs in the United States do not have a gerontological staff member.

To better identify those who are most qualified and experienced in managing patient care, there is an APRN Specialty Certification in Gerontology. This APRN Gerontological Specialist Certification (GS-c) distinguishes APRNs who possess expert knowledge, experience, and skill in managing the complex health needs of older adults.

Due to the knowledge gap from nursing school to the work force, it is advised that nurse educators modify current curriculum to the fast growing elderly population by incorporating content specific to the care of the elderly from pre-licensure through the doctorate's level. Researcher Cline was able to create a framework centering around the complexity of care among the elderly, that schools could use to educate students with the intention to improve quality of care. Another study by Hsu et al., revealed that nursing students were more likely to have a positive attitude towards older adults if they had good experiences in gerontological nursing courses and clinicals.

== Issues in Gerontological Nursing ==
The nursing shortage continues to affect all aspects of nursing, and gerontological nursing is no exception. It is estimated that 50-150% more nurses will be needed in this speciality in the next decade. Often nursing students do not express a desire to work in gerontological nursing as their specialty. This can be due to negative stereotypes, misconceptions, and attitudes toward the aging that are common among nursing students. A study conducted by Garbrah et al. (2017) found that nursing students were less to work in gerontological nursing due to lack of experiences, negative experiences during clinicals, negative perceptions of aging, stereotypical attitudes, and prejudice. In order for nursing students to have an interest in gerontological nursing, students should first be introduced to healthy older adults. In addition, nurse educators should be enthusiastic, passionate, and knowledgeable about geriatrics. Nursing facilities should also implement age friendly curriculum to nursing students and current nursing staff.

In order to fulfill the open positions of the nursing shortage, many students are choosing to obtain their associate degree in nursing. Nurses who are experts in gerontologic nursing are what is needed, though associate degree nursing programs are not readily preparing their students in this specialty area. According to Boutin et al. (2019), newly licensed associate degree registered nurses have not yet acquired the knowledge, skills, or attitudes to effectively care for this aging population. Therefore, this lack of education is limiting the number of nurses available to fulfill open positions in this area. It is imperative that associate degree nursing programs integrate evidence based gerontological nursing content into their programs as this is the primary population that needs to be taken care of upon graduation. The knowledge and attitudes of the faculty teaching this information is also imperative to persuading nurses to want to specialize in this area of nursing.

Another study conducted by Negad (2017) found a challenge nurse's experience are having poor relationships with families and residents. Nurses in the study reported having difficulty caring for patients with unstable conditions such as dementia. Families will often have high expectations of the nurses, however due to the work load nurses were unable to perform some of the interventions that the residents needed.

Gerontological nursing can be unpopular because geriatric nurses are sometimes perceived to be somewhat inferior in capabilities, or not good enough for other specialties. Facilities have also discouraged competent nurses from working in these settings by paying low salaries.

Gerontological nursing has been complicated by the areas where elderly patients live. There has been an increase in the elderly population in rural areas. 19% or more of the population is aged 65 years or more compared to 15% of those of the same age range in non-rural areas (Sharp et al., 2019). This creates a challenge of providing enough staff nurses to meet the needs of these patients. Nursing shortages certainly do play a role in this case. This can cause greater health disparities due to the increasing rates of chronic diseases and the lack of resources and those resources needed being so far away. There is a need to blend the complementary skills provided by every discipline so that the focus of the interdisciplinary partnership is on patient-centered care addressing the health disparities and health inequities experienced by the elderly (Sharp et al., 2019). Interdisciplinary team approaches provide better health support for the rural elderly population than just having a single discipline.

Geriatric care facilities face a problem of staff retention of both professional workers (including registered nurses) and paraprofessionals (including nursing assistants). The American Healthcare Association found a turnover rate of 65% for registered nurses working in nursing homes. A study was conducted by White et al. (2019) and it was found that the work environment plays a major role in improving nurse retention in nursing homes. It was found that nursing homes with good versus poor working conditions were one-tenth as likely to feel dissatisfied with their job and one-eighth as likely to feel burned out when working in a good environment. A few interventions to improve staff retention and support nurses are to provide continuing education courses to nurses, preceptor programs should be provided to newly hire nurses, and, quality assurance programs should be implemented to help nurses identify areas that may need improvement. Burnout among nurses in geriatric care is common. Physical stressors, such as frequent heavy lifting, and emotional stressors, such as regularly encountering death, all contribute.

Due to advances in medicine, adults are receiving the opportunity to live longer, healthier lives. In response to this, there have been concerns associate with the concept of ageism. This is the negative practice of discrimination of individuals solely on their age. This act can ultimately hinder an adults experience in receiving adequate health care leading to an overall risk of impaired health.

In response to this, Levy (2018) proposed the implementation of the PEACE (positive education about aging and contact experiences) model with the intent to provide education on aging as well as to promoting positive experiences with older adults. The overall goal is to reduce prejudice and stereotypical attitudes towards older adults in all settings.

== Global Challenges in Gerontological Nursing ==
In 2017 global population aged 60 years and older reached more than 962 million; more than twice the number of 1980, when the worldwide population of older persons was 382 million. By 2050 the projected number of older persons is expected to double again, reaching 2.1 billion. By 2030, older people are expected to outnumber children under age 10-14 (1 billion vs. 1.35 billion) and eventually outnumber the number of adolescents and youth globally. Furthermore, the number of persons age 80 years or over is projected to increase more than threefold by 2050, climbing from 127 million to 425 million.

The growing geriatric population's economic and social needs must be anticipated globally and include worldwide collaboration between governments and organizations in order to deliver new and innovative strategies addressing the unique needs of the aging population. Policies and services need to be specifically tailored to the older population including housing, employment, healthcare, infrastructure, and protection. Systems must manage health promotion, gender equality, employment, reduce inequity across countries, and collaborate to include global societies.

There are many global challenges to gerontological nursing including, the rapid increase in the older population, the need for different ways of working, transnational migration, changing core competencies, international collaboration, facilitating choice, and the global nurse shortages.

To support the unprecedented global growth of the elderly population, nurses will be required to modify core competencies and skills to reflect the unique healthcare needs of the older population. New roles must be defined, and research, education, and clinical practice must support those caring for the geriatric population. Older people are the primary users of health services worldwide; therefore, the healthcare system must proactively develop strategies to maximize services to effectively deliver quality care to the increasing number of older people in both developed and developing countries.

Knowledge and understanding of various cultures and their beliefs, values, and practices is vital in caring for older adults worldwide. Because of the shift globally in the aging population, more gerontological education in nursing curriculums and clinical experiences must be incorporated. Nurses must prepare to deliver safe, effective, quality care to this population, including learning to recognize the unique differences in cultural needs across the world. Booker (2015) suggests an International service-learning curriculum aimed at teaching principles on cross-cultural gerontology, including voluntary services in other countries as a student to gain insight into the social determinants and healthcare practices, outcomes, and policy issues in diverse populations.

Nursing students and nurses will need strategic education on how to care for an aging society. One barrier to the advancement of gerontological nursing is a global shortage of nurses. The sharp and steady increase in the aging population coupled with a lack of nurses to care for them, highlights the same issues such as nurse burn-out and retention rates seen in other countries around the world. National and international policies are currently being developed in response to the shortage of nurses worldwide and the needed transformation of nursing education, practice, and collaboration standards.
