= Clara Noyes =

American nurse (1869–1936)

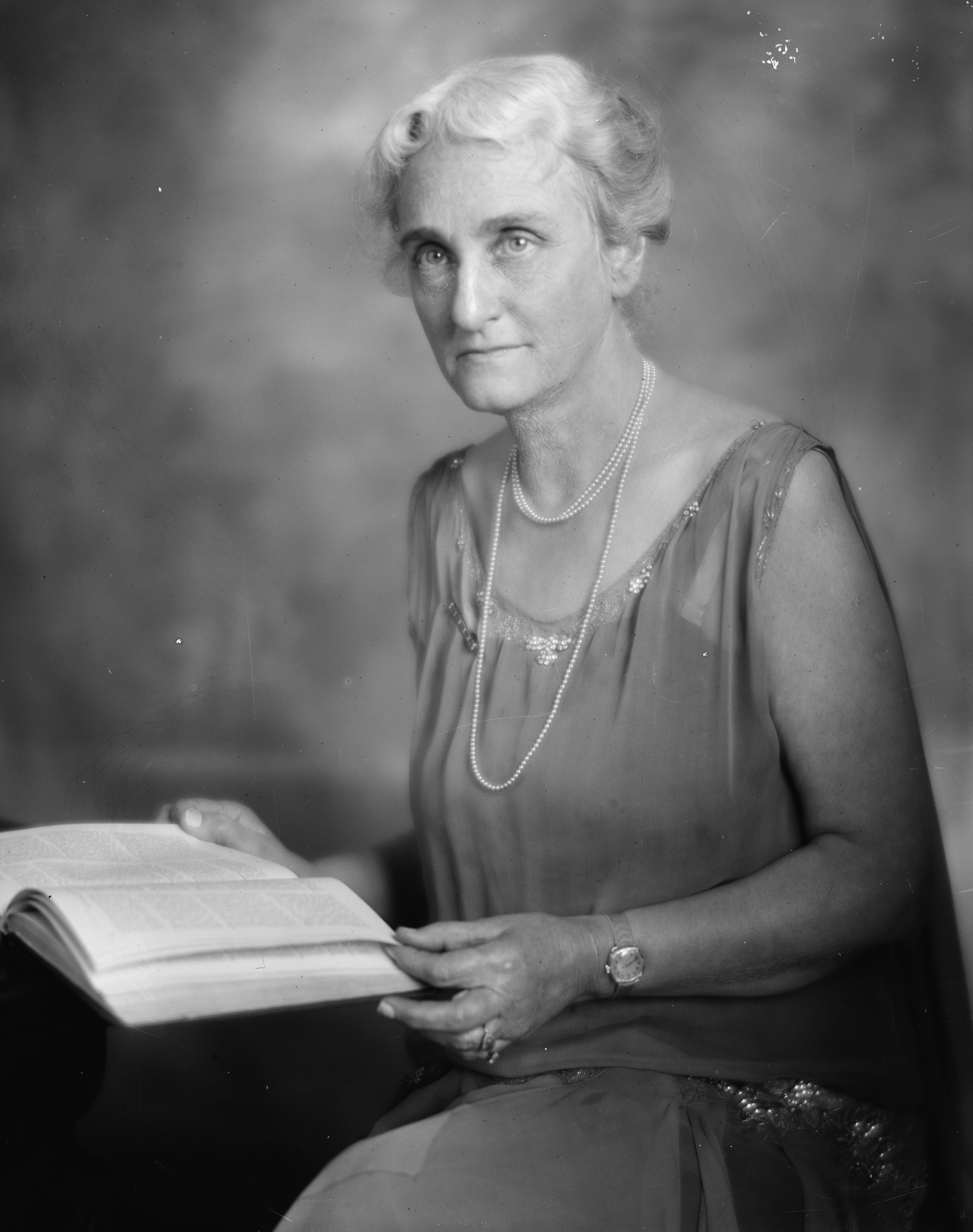
- Clara Noyes in 1905
- Born: October 3, 1869
- Died: June 3, 1936 (aged 66); Washington, D.C., United States

Clara Dutton Noyes (1869 – 1936) was an American nurse who headed the American Red Cross department of nursing during World War I. In 1998, she was inducted into the American Nurses Association Hall of Fame.

== Early life and education ==
Clara Dutton Noyes was born in Port Deposit, Maryland, one of the ten children of Enoch Noyes and Laura Lay Banning Noyes. Her father had been a colonel with the 26th Connecticut Volunteers in the American Civil War. She graduated from nurses' training at Johns Hopkins School of Nursing in 1896.

== Career ==
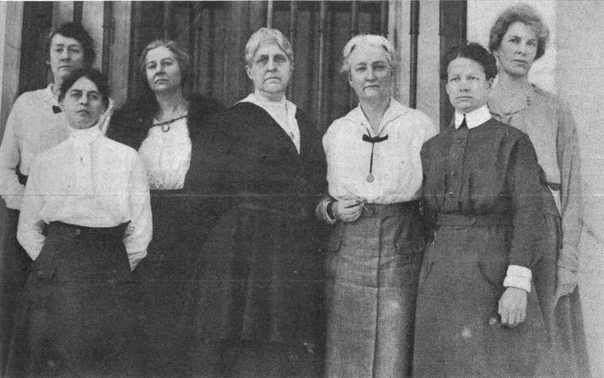
Chief Executives of the American Red Cross Department of Nursing (1918). Noyes is third from the right, between Jane Delano and Elizabeth Gordon Fox.

During World War I and after, Clara Noyes was director of the American Red Cross's Bureau of Nursing, responsible for recruiting, assigning, and organizing nurses for assignments overseas in war zones and epidemics, and in the United States during natural disasters and other emergencies. She lectured and wrote on matters of public health, disaster relief, and nursing education. In 1920 she went to inspect Red Cross project sites in the Balkans, Greece, Czechoslovakia and Poland.

From 1918 to 1922 she was president of the American Nurses Association, and of the National Graduate Nurses Association. She also served a term as president of the National League of Nursing Education. She helped establish the Bureau of Nursing Information. In 1923, she was awarded the Florence Nightingale Medal by the International Committee of the Red Cross. In 1933, she was awarded the Saunders Medal by the National League of Nursing Education, for her many years of service to her profession.

Clara Noyes wrote about "The Midwifery Problem" in an article with that title in 1912. She advocated for education, certification, and supervision. She proposed a School of Midwifery modeled on schools of nursing, and she started a program for midwives while she was a nurse supervisor at Bellevue Hospital.

== Later life and legacy ==
Clara Dutton Noyes died in 1936, after a heart attack while driving in Washington, D.C., aged 66 years. In 1998 she was inducted into the American Nurses Association Hall of Fame.

Clara Noyes: Life of A Global Nursing Leader (2017) is a recent biography of Noyes, by her great-great nephew Roger Noyes.
