= Elizabeth Bixler Torrey =

American nurse (1899–1976)

Elizabeth Bixler Torrey (October 29, 1899 – August 14, 1976) was an American nurse who spent much of her career working to improve accreditation standards for American schools of nursing.

== Biography ==
On October 29, 1899 Elizabeth Seelye Bixler was born to Mabel Seelye Bixler and James Wilson Bixler in New London, Connecticut.

She obtained her B.A. from Smith College in 1922, followed by an M.A. in Archaeology from Radcliffe College in 1924. In 1927, she obtained her B.N. from Yale University School of Nursing. Afterwards, Torrey stayed on as staff, serving first as a Night Supervisor from 1927–1928, and then as an assistant professor of nursing from 1930–1934. She returned to the Yale School of Nursing as Dean from 1944–1959.
