= Ernestine Wiedenbach =

German nursing theorist (1900–1998)

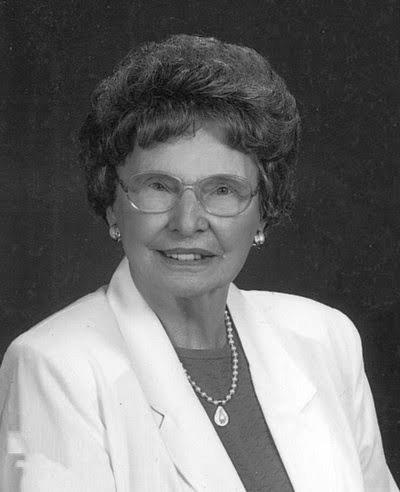
- Born: August 18, 1900
- Died: March 8, 1998 (aged 97)
- Education: Teachers College, Columbia University

Ernestine Wiedenbach (August 18, 1900 in Hamburg, Germany – March 8, 1998) was a nursing theorist. Her family emigrated to New York in 1909, where she later received a B.A. from Wellesley College in 1922, an R.N. from Johns Hopkins School of Nursing in 1925, an M.A. from Teachers College, Columbia University in 1934, and a certificate in nurse-midwifery from the Maternity Center Association School for Nurse-Midwives in New York in 1946.

Wiedenbach taught there until 1951, and in 1952, joined the Yale University faculty as an instructor in maternity nursing. She was named an assistant professor of obstetric nursing in 1954 and an associate professor in 1956 when the Yale School of Nursing established a master's degree program under which she directed the major in maternal and newborn health nursing. Wiedenbach's books are used widely in nursing education. She retired in 1966.

== Theories ==
Wiedenbach's theory is outlined below:

1. Prescriptive theory: This is a situation-producing theory that directs actions toward an explicit goal.

The prescriptive theory has three factors:

1. Central purpose (nurse's philosophy for care). Central purpose philosophy underlies purpose and purpose reflects philosophy.
2. Essential to the particular discipline.
3. The prescription for the fulfillment of the central purpose, directive to activity. Realities in the immediate situation that influence the fulfillment of the central purpose. The matrix in which the action occurs.

There are three components for nursing philosophy:

1. Reverence for the gift of life.
2. Respect for the dignity, worth, autonomy, and individuality of each human being.
3. Resolution to act dynamically about one’s beliefs.

The prescription:

Actions appropriate to implement a plan to carry out the actions following the central purpose. Actions may be voluntary (intended response), or involuntary (unintended response).

There are three voluntary actions:

1. Mutually understood and agreed-upon action. The recipient understands the implication of the action and is receptive to it.
2. Recipient-directed action. The recipient directs the way the action is carried out.
3. Practitioner-directed action. The practitioner acts.

The realities:

After the nurse determines the central purpose and has developed the prescription she considers the realities. There are five realities.

The agent has four basic responsibilities:

1. To reconcile assumptions about the realities.
2. To specify the objectives.
3. To practice nursing according to the objectives.
4. To engage in related activities that contribute to self-realization and the improvement of nursing. The recipient or patient is vulnerable and is dependent on others for help and risks losing their individuality, dignity, worth, and autonomy. The nurse wishes to achieve the goal of directed outcomes. The means or activities that the nurse is empowered to achieve the goals. The framework consists of human, environmental, professional, and organizational facilities.

2. Wiedenbach’s conceptualization of nursing practice and process: It states that nursing practice is an art, in which the nursing action is based on the principles of helping.

It consists of four types of actions:

1. Reflex (spontaneous).
2. Conditioned (automatic)
3. Impulsive (impulsive).
4. Deliberate (responsible).

The nursing practice has three components:

1. Identification of the patient’s needs.
2. Ministration of the help needed.
3. Validation of the action taken.

Clinical nursing has four components:

1. Philosophy, the personal position of the nurse towards reality.
2. Purpose, overall goal.
3. Practice includes four components: Identification or need for help, the ministration of help needed, validation of the help needed, and the coordination of help & resources for help.
4. The art of clinical nursing requires using individual interpretations of behavior in meeting needs for help. Identification for the need of help involves:
  - Observing inconsistencies and acquiring information about patient’s needs.
  - Determining whether the patient can meet the need for help.
  - Determining the cause of the discomfort or need for help.

== Works ==
- Wiedenbach, Ernestine (1958). Family-centered maternity nursing, New York: G. P. Putnam’s Sons.
- Wiedenbach, Ernestine (1964). Clinical Nursing: A helping art. New York: Springer.
- Wiedenbach, Ernestine (1978-06-29). Communication: key to effective nursing. Tiresias Press. LCCN 78050063. OCLC 560905704.
- Wiedenbach, Ernestine. Meeting the realities in clinical teaching.
