= American Nurses Credentialing Center =

Professional certification body

- Abbreviation: ANCC
- Formation: 1991
- Headquarters: Silver Spring, Maryland, U.S.
- Parent organization: American Nurses Association
- Website: www.nursingworld.org/ancc

The American Nurses Credentialing Center (ANCC), a subsidiary of the American Nurses Association (ANA), is a certification body for nursing board certification and the largest certification body for advanced practice registered nurses in the United States, as of 2011 certifying over 75,000 APRNs, including nurse practitioners and clinical nurse specialists.

ANCC's nursing board certification program is one of the oldest in the United States, and many of its certifications were established before 1980, when nursing certification was still in early developmental stages.

== History ==
In 1966, the American Nursing Association amended its bylaws to allow the creation of certification boards for nurses in various areas of practice.

Two years later, the ANC's Nursing Practice Department published a paper promoting certification standards. From the ideas presented in this paper, the Congress for Nursing Practice drafted guidelines for the certification process in 1969. Within a few years, several nursing practice divisions had drafted certification processes based upon these guidelines.

In 1973, the ANA announced a national certification program for nursing practice. By 1974, the first certification examinations were administered.

Over the following 17 years, the ANA continued to expand its nursing credentialing exams to cover more areas of practice and administration. The ANA decided in 1990 to create the American Nurses Credentialing Center (ANCC) as a subsidiary nonprofit corporation through which it would sell its certification services and exams.

In 1999, the ANCC created an international branch of the organization in order to provide its services outside of the United States.

Primary Accreditation Established in 1974, Primary Accreditation recognizes organizations (or components of organizations) that offer continuing education for nurses. This accreditation contributes to health care quality and professional nursing practice by defining standards for the development and delivery of continuing education and by providing a voluntary peer review process to assure compliance.

== Services ==
Other services of the ANCC include an accreditation program for nursing continuing education providers and approvers, and the Magnet Recognition Program, which rates medical institutions for their nursing excellence.

The ANCC also runs the Pathway to Excellence program to help hospitals improve their working environment for nurses.

In 1998, the ANCC created the Institute for Research, Education, and Consultation (IREC), which provides the following services: certification, Magnet Recognition Program, Pathway to Excellence, and accreditation.

=== Certification-related products and services ===
1. Live review seminars
2. National study groups
3. Web-based e-learning
4. Certification review manuals
5. Web-based practice questions and answers

=== Magnet recognition program-related products and services ===
1. Annual National Magnet Conference
2. Magnet workshops
3. Consulting services
4. Web-based e-learning

=== Pathway to Excellence program-related products and services ===
1. Pathway workshops
2. Consulting services
3. Web-based e-learning

=== Accreditation program-related products and services ===
1. Annual Accreditation Symposium
2. Consulting services

=== Certification exams ===
ANCC offers certification programs in 29 nursing specialties:

- Ambulatory care nursing
- Cardiac vascular nursing
- Gerontological nursing
- Informatics nursing
- Medical-surgical nursing
- Nurse Executive (formerly Nursing Administration)
- Nursing Case Management
- Nursing Professional Development
- Pain Management
- Pediatric nursing
- Psychiatric and mental health nursing
- Public Health Nursing - Advanced
- Acute Care Nurse Practitioner
- Adult Nurse Practitioner
- Adult Psychiatric & Mental Health Nurse Practitioner
- Family Nurse Practitioner
- Family Psychiatric and Mental Health Nurse Practitioner
- Gerontological Nurse Practitioner
- Pediatric Nurse Practitioner ( ANCC no longer offers this certification)
- Adult Health Clinical Nurse Specialist
- Adult Psychiatric and Mental Health Clinical Nurse Specialist
- Child/Adolescent Psychiatric and Mental Health Clinical Nurse Specialist
- Gerontological Clinical Nurse Specialist
- Pediatric Clinical Nurse Specialist
- Advanced Practice Adult Psychiatric and Mental Health Nursing
- Nurse Executive, Advanced (formerly Nursing Administration, Advanced)
