= Ann Kurth =

Ann Elizabeth Kurth
- Education: Princeton University (AB); Columbia University (MPH); Yale School of Nursing (MSN); University of Washington (PhD)
- Known for: Epidemiologist, global health
- Children: Aden Kurth Kahr
- Scientific career
- Workplaces: New York University; Yale School of Nursing

Ann Elizabeth Kurth, PhD, CNM, MPH, FAAN, FACNM is President of The New York Academy of Medicine (NYAM), a leading nonprofit organization focused on health equity; she is the first epidemiologist to lead NYAM in its 176-year history. Previously she was the dean and Linda Koch Lorimer Professor at Yale School of Nursing (YSN). She is a fellow of the National Academy of Medicine and was a member of the United States Preventive Services Task Force. She is an expert in global health and HIV with work funded by the National Institutes of Health, Bill & Melinda Gates Foundation, CDC, and others, for studies in the US and internationally. Dr. Kurth has published ~250 peer-reviewed articles, chapters, and monographs. She currently co-chairs the National Academy of Medicine Board on Global Health, which includes a focus on health issues of national and global import.

== Early life and education ==
Kurth completed her bachelor's degree magna cum laude at Princeton University where she specialised in African and Developmental Studies and completed in 1984. She completed a Master of Public Health at Columbia University, graduating in 1987. She was clinically educated at Yale School of Nursing where she earned a Master of Science in Nursing in 1990. She was certified as a nurse-midwife in 1990. She joined the University of Washington for her doctoral studies, gaining a PhD in epidemiology in 2003. In 1993 she published her doctoral research in a book - Until the Cure: Caring for Women with HIV - one of the first textbooks that described HIV in women. The book considers the ethical issues, including the reproductive rights of women with HIV, and legal conflicts. She worked as a National Institutes of Health postdoctoral fellow in Seattle between 2000 and 2003.

== Career ==
In 2003 Kurth was appointed assistant professor at the University of Washington School of Nursing. In 2008 she joined New York University Rory Meyers College of Nursing as a professor. She was made executive director of the New York University Rory Meyers College of Nursing in 2011. She was the founder and executive director of NYUCN Global, which researches and implements programs to improve the health of families in the United States. She was awarded a $4.1 million National Institutes of Health grant to support a five-year proposal Test and Linkage to Care Kenya, which looked at HIV infections in sub-Saharan Africa. This work studied ways to prevent HIV in different communities. It piloted a SMART intervention to link HIV-positive women youth for treatment, including oral fluid self-testing, staff-aided testing and standard provider testing to determine a population's preference for HIV testing. They used reminder SMS messages and financial incentives to link to care.

She has consulted for the Bill & Melinda Gates Foundation, UNAIDS, United States Agency for International Development and the National Institutes of Health. She was made a fellow of the Institute Of Medicine in 2013. She was a member of the American Academy of Nursing Ebola Task Force between 2014 and 2015. She was appointed Dean of the Yale School of Nursing in Jan 2016. She was the inaugural Linda Koch Lorimer Professor of Nursing.

She was a member 2014-2018 of the United States Preventive Services Task Force. She was selected as Nurse of the Week by Daily Nurse in 2016. She voiced concern on possible repeal of the Patient Protection and Affordable Care Act, and joined a coalition of deans to write a letter to leaders in D.C. She has reviewed the planetary health framework by monitoring how population displacement and disease patterns impact health. They developed CARE, Computer Assisted Risk Education, an automated counselling and planning tool to improve health outcomes. In 2018 she was made the Chair of the Consortium of Universities for Global Health.

== Awards and honours ==
2022 Fellow of the American College of Nurse Midwives

2017 Fellow of the Connecticut Academy of Science and Engineering

2015 Friends of the National Institute of Nursing Research Ada Sue Hinshaw Research Award

2013 Elected Member, Institute of Medicine/National Academy of Medicine, Nat’l Academy of Sciences

2013 Sigma Theta Tau International International Nurse Researcher Hall of Fame award

2013 Yale School of Nursing ‘90 Nurses for 90 Years’ Award 2011 Fellow of the New York Academy of Medicine

2011 Fellow of the New York Academy of Medicine

2011 New York University Rory Meyers College of Nursing Vernice Ferguson Faculty Scholar Award

2010 Fellow of the American Academy of Nursing

2008 University of Washington Martin Luther King Jr. Community Service Award 2007 University of Washington Biobehavioral Nursing and Health Systems Faculty Award

1990 New Haven Foundation Ivy Award
