= Ira V. Hiscock =

Bacteriologist

Ira Vaughn Hiscock (May 7, 1892 – April 4, 1986) was a bacteriologist and a leading authority on public health. He was an innovator of comprehensive health surveys throughout the United States and Samoa, and led various panels of the World Health Organization.

== Biography ==
Born in Farmington, Maine, he received his Bachelor of Arts degree from Wesleyan University and his master's degree and doctorate in public health from Yale University.

Hiscock joined the faculty of Yale in 1920. He served as Anna M. R. Lauder Professor of Public Health and as chairman of the university's Department of Public Health from 1945 to 1960. An endowed professorship at Yale now bears his name.

He served as president of the National Health Council, the American Public Health Association, the Association of Schools of Public Health and the National Society for the Prevention of Blindness.

== Contributions ==
Hiscock was a pioneer in cancer research. In the early 1930s, the New Haven Cancer Committee, which he chaired, found that the city had one of the highest cancer mortality rates in New England. The committee became a model for collection of uniform data and follow-up, leading to the establishment of the Connecticut Tumor Registry in 1935.

He authored more than 300 papers and several books including Community Health Organization, first published in 1927.

Hiscock became associated with the American Public Health Association (A.P.H.A.) in 1921 and in 1925 he was given the responsibility of editing and reviewing all national, state, and local public health surveys for the A.P.H.A.'s Journal of American Public Health. In 1926, he was appointed to the A.P.H.A.'s Committee on Administrative Practice (C.A.P.) which was chaired by C.-E.A. Winslow. He became a member of the committee's field staff which conducted health surveys of municipal health programs around the country. Standards and appraisals of health organizations, their health services, and public health facilities were direct outgrowths of these surveys. For example, Hiscock wrote "Plans of Organization of Community Health Work for Cities of 100,000, 50,000 and 30,000 Population," a study of community health organization plans for C.A.P.

He chaired the International Association of Dairy and Milk Inspectors committee on the Food Value of Milk and sought endorsements for pasteurization from pediatricians and the U.S. Attorney General. For the committee Hiscock also investigated the use of pasteurized milk for infant formula and the inoculation of dairy herds against diseases such as tuberculosis.

Hiscock worked on the Yale Law School Bankruptcy Study (1929-1930) to assess and remedy public health and welfare problems created or aggravated by the Great Depression. The study, conducted by William O. Douglas of the Yale Law School in conjunction with the Department of Public Health, examined contributing factors and results of business failures in New Jersey.

In 1927 Hiscock was involved in an American Red Cross Association funded study of the sanitation problems and needs created by a devastating flood in Arkansas.

He conducted research for the Metropolitan Life Insurance Co. on the mortality rates and causes of death of former Yale athletes.

The Ira V. Hiscock Award is presented annually to a Connecticut layperson who, or organization that, has made notable contributions to the advancement of public health through public service, education, advocacy, and/or leadership.
