= Elizabeth Gordon Fox =

American nurse (1884–1958)

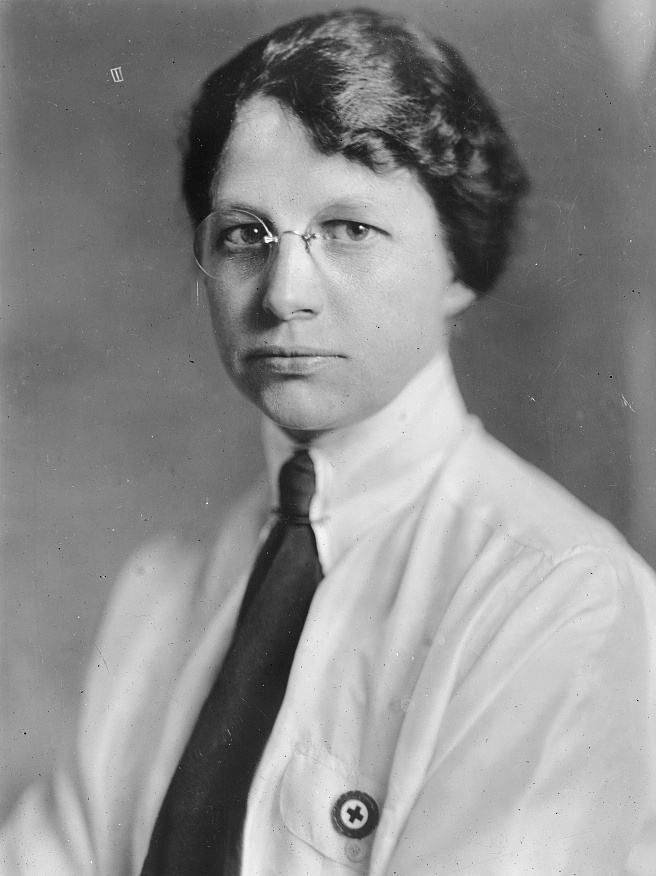
- Elizabeth G. Fox in 1920 (Library of Congress).
- Born: 1884; Milwaukee, Wisconsin
- Died: November 13, 1958 (aged 73–74); Newington, Connecticut
- Occupations: nurse, public health administrator
- Known for: Director of the Public Health Nursing Service during and after World War I
- Awards: Florence Nightingale Medal (1931)

Elizabeth Gordon Fox (1884 — November 13, 1958) was an American Red Cross nurse, director of the Public Health Nursing Service during and after World War I. She was the twelfth American recipient of the Florence Nightingale Medal when it was awarded by the International Committee of the Red Cross in 1931.

== Early life ==
Elizabeth Gordon Fox was born in Milwaukee, the daughter of Edwin M. Fox and Frances K. Gordon Fox. Her brother E. Gordon Fox was an engineer in Chicago. She graduated from the University of Wisconsin in 1907, and trained as a nurse at Johns Hopkins School of Nursing, completing her studies in the class of 1910.

== Career ==
Fox began her career with the Chicago Visiting Nurses Association in 1912. From 1918 to 1930, Fox was director of the Bureau of Public Health Nursing of the American Red Cross. She was associate director under Fannie Clement before becoming director. In 1922, she was co-author of The History of American Red Cross Nursing with Lavinia Dock, Sarah Elizabeth Pickett, Clara D. Noyes, Fannie F. Clement, and Anna R. VanMeter. "Forceful, direct and unaffected, a keen and analytical thinker and a remarkable organizer, Miss Fox held her bureau in strong hands," according to her colleagues in 1922.

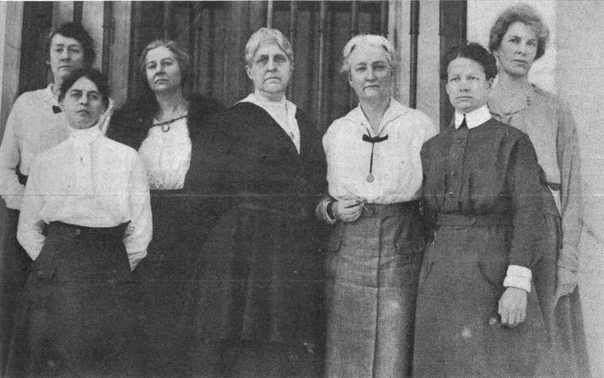
Chief Executives of the American Red Cross Department of Nursing (1918); Elizabeth G. Fox is second from the right.

As president of the National Organization for Public Health Nursing (NOPHN), succeeding Edna Lois Foley in 1921, she wrote frequently for The Public Health Nurse and other professional journals, and lectured nationally on public health nursing. She contributed to the discussions on the role of public health nurses in the professionalization of midwifery, and in disaster relief. She spoke on public health nursing at the National Council of Women meeting in Cincinnati in 1927.

In 1930, she was chosen as the American advisor to the League of Red Cross Societies. In 1931, she became the twelfth American recipient of the Florence Nightingale Medal, and the first American so awarded for civilian nursing.

She was on the faculty of the Yale School of Nursing for 19 years, from 1930 until her retirement in 1949. She was also director of the New Haven Visiting Nurses Association. She also served a term as president of the Connecticut State Nurses Association.

== Death ==
Fox died at a Connecticut Public Health Association ceremony honoring her lifetime of leadership and service, at a hospital in Newington, Connecticut, in 1958; she was 74 years old. There are papers related to Elizabeth Gordon Fox in the Charles-Edward Amory Winslow papers at Yale.
