= Adult-gerontology nurse practitioner =

Specialized nurse practitioner

Occupation
- Occupation type: profession
- Activity sectors: healthcare, advanced practice registered nurse

Description
- Education required: Master's degree or Doctorate degree
- Related jobs: nurse midwife, nurse anesthetist, clinical nurse specialist

An adult-gerontology nurse practitioner (AGNP) is a nurse practitioner that specializes in continuing and comprehensive healthcare for adults across the lifespan from adolescence to old age.

== Education and board certification ==
Following educational preparation at the master's or doctoral level, AGNPs must become board certified by an approved certification body. Board certification must be maintained by obtaining nursing continuing education credits. To align with the Consensus Model for APRN Regulation developed by the National Council of State Boards of Nursing, certification exams and credentials are in transition. Prior to the consensus statement, adult health nurse practitioners (NPs) and gerontological NPs were educated and certified separately. The consensus model combined these into a single population focus. The specialty is further divided into primary care and acute care. In the US, board certification is provided through the American Association of Critical-Care Nurses (awards the ACNPC-AG credential for acute care), or the American Nurses Credentialing Center (awards the AGACNP-BC credential for acute care and the AGPCNP-BC credential for primary care), through the American Association of Nurse Practitioners certification program (awards the NP-C credential for primary care.

== Scope of practice ==
AGNPs deliver a range of acute, chronic and preventive healthcare services. In addition to diagnosing and treating illness, they also provide preventive care, including routine checkups, health-risk assessments, immunization and screening tests, and personalized counseling on maintaining a healthy lifestyle. AGNPs also manage chronic illness, often coordinating care provided by specialty physicians. AGNPs that work in acute care settings often care for hospitalized patients in collaboration with physicians and other providers. AGNPs can be found practicing in a variety of medical facilities including hospices, long-term care facilities, hospitals, home-based care, correctional institutes and primary practices. The scope of practice varies from state to state because nurse practice laws and regulations are specific to the state the nurse practitioner practices in.

== Skills ==
By 2030, older people are expected to outnumber children aged 10 to 14 (1.35 billion versus 1 billion), eventually surpassing the number of adolescents and young people worldwide.

Nurses need to be prepared to provide safe, effective and quality care to this population, including learning to recognise the unique differences in cultural needs around the world. Older people have three characteristics to look out for: frailty, disability and comorbidities.

Although specific responsibilities may depend on specialty and type of employment, these are the most common responsibilities for AGNP:

- Conducting wellness visits, examinations and treatment monitoring of adult patients
- Examination of patients for signs of injuries, disorders or illnesses
- Diagnostics and analysis of results
- Prescribing medication and monitoring the progress of treatment
- Refer patients to specialists
- Document patients' medical histories
- Inform patients about current or potential conditions to prevent or to treat symptoms
- Encourage lifestyle changes, such as dietary changes or increased physical activity
- Advise on community health policies
- Collaborate with paramedics, nurses and doctors to ensure comprehensive care

== See also ==
- Advanced practice registered nurse
