= Acute care nurse practitioner =

An acute care nurse practitioner (ACNP) is a registered nurse who has completed an accredited graduate-level educational program that prepares them as a nurse practitioner. This program includes supervised clinical practice to acquire advanced knowledge, skills, and abilities. This education and training qualifies them to independently: (1) perform comprehensive health assessments; (2) order and interpret the full spectrum of diagnostic tests and procedures; (3) use a differential diagnosis to reach a medical diagnosis; and (4) order, provide, and evaluate the outcomes of interventions. The purpose of the ACNP is to provide advanced nursing care across the continuum of health care services to meet the specialized physiologic and psychological needs of patients with acute, critical, and/or complex chronic health conditions. This care is continuous and comprehensive and may be provided in any setting where the patient may be found. The ACNP is a licensed independent practitioner and may autonomously provide care. Whenever appropriate, the ACNP considers formal consultation and/or collaboration involving patients, caregivers, nurses, physicians, and other members of the interprofessional team.

== Scope of practice ==
The scope of practice for a nurse practitioner includes the range of skills, procedures, and processes for which the individual has been educated, trained, and credentialed to perform. Scope of practice for nurse practitioners is defined at four levels: 1) professional, 2) state, 3) institutional, and 4) self-determined. At the professional level, nursing organizations such as the AACN and the ANCC regulate nursing certification and publish guidelines for the scope and standards of practice for ACNP's. At the state level, nurse practice acts and administrative rules and regulations define requirements for licensure. Because of rapid changes in health care technologies, state nurse practice acts rarely define specific tasks that a nurse practitioner may conduct. Many state nurse practice acts still do not define scope of practice based on board certification or educational preparation. In states that require collaborative practice agreements, these documents frame the scope of practice for entry-level ACNP's. Collaborative practice agreements may also include language about future expansion of scope of practice based on continuing education and field experience. ACNP's with collaborative practice agreements review them often to ensure that they confer the authority to practice at the full extent of education and training.

At the institutional level, ACNP scope of practice is outlined in a nurse practitioner privilege form. This document lists core privileges that apply to all nurse practitioners in a facility as well as special privileges that represent the individual ACNP's education and training. The privilege form specifies which practices can be performed autonomously and which practices require physician supervision. For certain practices (e.g. intubation, chest tube insertion) the privilege form may also specify how many supervised procedures must be performed before the ACNP may practice autonomously. The specific privileges granted to an ACNP vary by practice setting and the practice specialties of collaborating physicians. Finally, ACNP's utilize self-determination when determining whether a given task is within a scope of practice. Self-determination requires not only an evaluation of personal competencies, but also an awareness of the capacities of other members of the healthcare team.

== Education, licensure, and certification ==
The education to become an ACNP involves several steps. First, one must hold current licensure as a Registered Nurse (RN) and meet the application criteria for an accredited master's, post-graduate or doctoral acute care nurse practitioner program. This program will prepare the Registered Nurse as an advanced practitioner. The National Organization of Nurse Practitioner Faculties list 9 core competencies that are gained from graduate education. These competencies include areas of:

1. Scientific Foundation
2. Leadership
3. Quality
4. Practice Inquiry
5. Technology and Information Literacy
6. Policy
7. Health Delivery System
8. Ethics
9. Independent Practice

Within these competencies, graduate level courses in pathophysiology, pharmacology and physical assessment are completed. Clinical experience is then gained. A minimum of 500 faculty-supervised clinical hours in the role of acute care nurse practitioner is gained. Once graduated from the program, Advanced Practice Registered Nurses may apply for Board Certification (BC) as an ACNP.

ACNP's have several options to become nationally board certified. The American Association of Critical-Care Nurses (AACN) offers the Acute Care Nurse Practitioner-Adult/Gero (ACNPC-AG) certification. Eligible candidates must pass an exam, possess a valid RN license and have a graduate-level nursing degree from an accredited acute care advanced practice nursing program. The American Nurses Credentialing Center offers the Adult-Gerontology Acute Care Nurse Practitioner - Board Certified (AGACNP-BC) credential. This credentialing exam replaces the ACNP-BC exam, in order to better align with the APRN Consensus Model, which promotes a more uniform model of nurse practitioner licensing, accreditation, certification, and education. Both credentials will continue to be used, but candidates who apply after 2015 will sit for the AGACNP-BC exam only. Candidates must possess a valid RN license and have a graduate level nursing degree from an accredited program which includes at least 500 clinical hours and specific content in pathophysiology, pharmacology, health assessment, health promotion and maintenance, and diagnosis and disease management. Many state boards of nursing require that nurse practitioners are certified by a national certifying body.

== Patient outcomes with ACNP care ==
In multiple studies, although not randomized to eliminate selection bias, care provided in the critical care setting by Nurse Practitioners and Physician Assistants has been equal to or superior to that provided by resident physicians and fellows. These studies are limited by their failure to randomize patient selection and have been highly criticized as the complexity of care assigned typically decreases with degree of practice. Patients cared for by acute care nurse practitioners in a neurosurgical setting during a period of six months were found to have shorter ICU lengths of stay, lower rates of urinary tract infections and less skin breakdown when compared to routine medical management In addition, a systematic review found that patients managed by the acute care nurse practitioners were hospitalized 2,306 fewer days than the baseline population cared for by fellows, resulting in $2,467,328 in cost savings.

== Role of the acute care nurse practitioner ==
The core competencies and knowledge base for the pediatric or adult-gerontology acute ACNP originate from the full spectrum of needs of high-acuity patients along the wellness-to-illness continuum. The ACNP provides individualized patient care based on the patient's age, gender, mental status, race, culture, individuality, ethnicity, spiritual beliefs, lifestyle, sexual orientation, socioeconomic status, disability, and family configuration. The type of care provided by the ACNP is determined by the needs of the patient and may include restorative, curative, rehabilitative, palliative, or supportive end-of-life care. The profile of an ACNP may include episodic management of a patient in a clinical speciality unit, following a caseload of patients during a hospitalization, or caring for patients across the acute care spectrum (hospitalization to home).

ACNP short-term patient care goals include stabilization of acute or life-threatening conditions, minimizing or preventing complications, and promoting physical and mental well-being. Long-term goals consist of restoring maximum health potential, evaluating risk factors, and managing co-morbid conditions. In order to achieve these goals of patient care, the ACNP utilizes the following key components:

- comprehensive history and physical examinations and other assessment and screening tools
- diagnosing, treating, and managing patients with acute and chronic illnesses
- ordering, performing, and interpreting lab and imaging studies
- prescribing medications, durable medical equipment, and therapeutic interventions
- developing psychomotor skills in the performance of procedures
- encouraging health promotion, disease prevention, health education, and counseling
- collaboration and communication with the interprofessional healthcare team
- assessing, educating, and providing referrals
- coordinating transitions in level of care

The ACNP's skill set is dependent on their population and specialty area of practice and includes a variety of procedures and skills when providing patient care. Skill performance is not only limited to the task, but also includes knowledge of indications, contraindications, complications, and their management.

=== Adult Gerontology Acute Care Nurse Practitioner ===
The patient population of the adult gerontology acute care nurse practitioner (AGACNP) includes young adults (late adolescents and emancipated minors), adults, and older adults. AGACNP disciplines include cardiology, pulmonary, neurology, hematology/oncology, ENT, surgery services, palliative care, and pain management.

=== Acute Care Pediatric Nurse Practitioner ===
The acute care pediatric nurse practitioner (ACPNP) cares for infants, children, and adolescents from birth to 21 years of age. It is the nurse's responsibility to incorporate the patient's age, developmental level, and family into all aspects of care, assessment, diagnosis, and management. The role of the ACPNP is to manage patients who are acutely ill or experiencing exacerbations of chronic conditions. ACPNPs may work outside of a hospital setting where acutely ill pediatric patients are cared for, such as HIV clinics, facilities for pediatric patients that are mechanically ventilated, transport services, and home.

=== Specialty Acute Care Nurse Practitioner ===
The specialty acute care nurse practitioner provides expertise for continuous and comprehensive patient care in an oftentimes fragmented setting. The functions of the specialty ACNP are based on the needs of the specialty patient population or the care delivery team in the organization. The scope of practice for the specialty ACNP outlines clinical functions and tasks that may be completed and are specific to the service team. For example, an oncology ACNP has knowledge that spans the cancer trajectory, from high-risk cancer clinics to hospice and palliative care. Role settings may include outpatient clinics, ICUs, or medical-surgical oncology units. Specialty ACNPs oftentimes must obtain a specialty certification for specified role practices.

== Reimbursement (United States) ==
The current procedural terminology (CPT) codes most frequently used by ACNPs are subsequent hospital visit codes (99231, 99232, and 99233) and critical care codes (99291 and 99292). The 3 main criteria for the critical care codes are (1) the condition of the patient, (2) the treatment criteria, and (3) time. The important concept when assigning a CPT code is that the intensity of the care of the patient determines the use of these codes, not where the patient is physically located.

The CMS published Transmittal 1548 in 2008, which addressed and tried to clarify questions about CPT codes 99291 and 99292. The transmittal states that "critical illness or injury impairs one or more vital organ systems such that there is a high probability of imminent or life-threatening deterioration in the patient’s condition." Documentation of ACNP or physician services should convey this life-threatening deterioration of an organ system (e.g., hemodynamic instability or worsening hypoxic respiratory failure) as well as the interventions to prevent further deterioration of the patient's condition. To maintain stability of the patient's condition, "critical care services involve high complexity decision-making to assess, manipulate and support vital system function(s)" and demand the full attention of the ACNP.

Critical care codes are one of the few CPT codes that are time dependent. These codes must have total time spent caring for a single patient clearly stated in the ACNP's note. The CMS states: "A qualified NPP may perform critical care services within the scope of practice and licensure requirements for the NPP in the state where he/she practices." Time spent providing critical care services must be performed at the bedside or on the unit.

The first critical care CPT code, 99291, is used when caring for critically ill or injured patients in the first 30 to 74 minutes. It can be used only once in a calendar day. The CPT code 99292 is used for each additional 30 minutes of care performed after the first 74 minutes. Time for face-to-face discussions with the patient and/or family (if the patient is not able to participate) can be included in the time for critical care services if the discussion is related to a specific treatment, such as the need for dialysis, and the justification for the treatment is documented. Phone conversations can also be included in time calculation if the above face-to-face criteria are also met. Regular daily updates on the patient's condition and plan for care cannot be included in time calculation.
