= Consensus Model for APRN Regulation =

The Consensus Model for APRN Regulation is a model and document created by the National Council of State Boards of Nursing to create consensus on licensure, accreditation, certification, and education for advanced practice registered nurses (APRNs).

The model has four roles: nurse practitioner, nurse anesthetist, nurse-midwife, and clinical nurse specialist. There are six population foci: family/individual across the lifespan, adult-gerontology, pediatrics, neonatal, women's health/gender-related, and psych/mental health. APRNs are educated and certified in one of the four roles and one or more of the population foci. Beyond population foci, APRNs can focus on and become certified in a specialty.

The model establishes education standards for programs that prepare APRNs as well accreditation of certification boards. Individual state boards of nursing have either adopted or in the process of adopting the model for APRN regulation.
