= Johns Hopkins School of Nursing =

Private school in Baltimore, Maryland, US

Johns Hopkins University School of Nursing
- Motto: Vigilando (Latin)
- Motto in English: Forever Watchful
- Type: Private nursing school
- Established: 1889
- Parent institution: Johns Hopkins University
- Dean: Sarah Szanton
- Faculty: 230 (80 full-time, 150 part-time)
- Students: 1075 (2014)
- Location: Baltimore, Maryland, United States
- Campus: Urban
- Website: nursing.jhu.edu

The Johns Hopkins University School of Nursing is the nursing school of Johns Hopkins University, a private research university in Baltimore, Maryland. Established in 1889, it is one of the nation's oldest schools for nursing education.

== Origins ==
The Johns Hopkins School of Nursing was founded as a result of the bequest and written instructions of its founder Johns Hopkins'. Before his death in December 1873, he wrote a letter to the board of trustees of the Johns Hopkins institutions setting forth his vision for formal nurse education. In correspondence dated March 10, 1873, he instructed the trustees to establish a training school for female nurses in connection with the Johns Hopkins Hospital, writing: “I desire you to establish, in connection with the hospital, a training school for female nurses.” Upon his death on December 24, 1873, Hopkins left behind an endowment of about $7 million to found the institutions that bear his name. His directive to incorporate nurse training as a core institutional function resulted in to the establishment of the Johns Hopkins School of Nursing. In October 1876, hospital planner John S. Billings sent preliminary plans for the Johns Hopkins Hospital to Florence Nightingale. He noted that the design included a training school for nurses and requested her critique. The organization, structure, and curriculum of the proposed nursing program were influenced by extensive consultation with Nightingale.

Johns Hopkins Hospital opened in May 1889, followed by the opening of the Johns Hopkins Hospital Training School for Nurses. The school operated as a hospital-based diploma program. The early leaders of the training school played a significant role in shaping professional nursing education in the United States. Under the direction of Superintendent Isabel Hampton Robb and later her successor Mary Adelaide Nutting, the program became an influential model for nursing education. Reforms introduced during this period included extending the length of study from two to three years.

The hospital-based diploma school closed in 1973. In 1984, Johns Hopkins University re-established the Johns Hopkins School of Nursing as a degree-granting division, admitting its first baccalaureate class that September.

== Academics ==
The School of Nursing offers pre-licensure programs to Master's, DNP and PhD programs, online options, post-degree opportunities, and nursing prerequisites. The school regularly appears near the top of national graduate nursing rankings. In the 2025 U.S. News & World Report Best Graduate Schools rankings (released April 2025), Johns Hopkins University was ranked No. 2 for “Best Nursing Schools: Master’s Programs” and No.1 for “Best Nursing Schools: DNP Programs”. In July 2024, Bloomberg Philanthropies announced a $1 billion donation to Johns Hopkins University to increase financial aid, including for students at the School of Nursing.

The university is institutionally accredited by the Middle States Commission on Higher Education (MSCHE). Accreditation was last reaffirmed in 2024. The School of Nursing's master's and DNP programs are accredited by the Commission on Collegiate Nursing Education (CCNE), with accreditation terms extending through December 31, 2028.

=== Research centers ===
The school has multiple research centers and related research groups including the (Center for Equity in Aging, the Nursing office Research and the Johns Hopkins Disability Health Research Center As well as the Hopkins Center to Promote resilience in persons and families living with multiple chronic conditions (the PROMOTE Center), supported by a National Institute of Nursing Research P30 grant, the school is also home to the country's first and only Peace Corps Fellows Program in nursing. The school additionally offers a special program for Arts and Science College students to transfer after two years. Other School of Nursing research centers include the Center for Cardiovascular and Chronic Care.

== Notable alumni ==
- Vashti Bartlett, Red Cross nurse during World War I, and in Vladivostok, Manchuria, and Haiti
- Alice Fitzgerald, director of the Nursing Bureau, League of Red Cross Societies, Geneva
- Elizabeth Gordon Fox, director of the Bureau of Public Nursing, American Red Cross
- Sara Virginia Ecker Watts Morrison, nurse and First Lady of North Carolina
- Mary Adelaide Nutting, first professor of nursing
- Isabel Hampton Robb, founder of modern American nursing theory and one of the most important leaders in the history of nursing, first dean of the school
- Elizabeth Lawrie Smellie, first woman Colonel of the Canadian army and Matron-in-chief of the Canadian Army Medical Corps
- Ernestine Wiedenbach, nursing theorist in maternity and clinical nursing
