= Clinical nurse specialist =

Advanced practice nurse

A clinical nurse specialist (CNS) is an advanced practice nurse who can provide advice related to specific conditions or treatment pathways. According to the International Council of Nurses (ICN), an Advanced Practice Nurse is a registered nurse who has acquired the expert knowledge base, complex decision-making skills and clinical competencies for expanded practice, the characteristics of which are shaped by the context and/or country in which s/he is credentialed to practice.

Clinical Nurse Specialists are registered nurses who have had graduate level nursing preparation at the master's or doctoral level as a CNS. They are clinical experts in evidence-based nursing practice within a specialty area, treating and managing the health concerns of patients and populations. The CNS specialty may be focused on individuals, populations, settings, type of care, type of problem, or diagnostic systems subspecialty. CNSs practice autonomously and integrate knowledge of disease and medical treatments into the assessment, diagnosis, and treatment of patients' illnesses. These nurses design, implement, and evaluate both patient–specific and population-based programs of care.

CNSs provide leadership in the advanced practice of nursing to achieve quality and cost-effective patient outcomes as well as provide leadership of multidisciplinary groups in designing and implementing innovative alternative solutions that address system problems and/or patient care issues. In many jurisdictions, CNSs, as direct care providers, perform comprehensive health assessments, develop differential diagnoses, and may have prescriptive authority. Prescriptive authority allows them to provide pharmacologic and nonpharmacologic treatments and order diagnostic and laboratory tests in addressing and managing specialty health problems of patients and populations. CNSs serve as patient advocates, consultants, and researchers in various settings.

== United States ==
In the United States, a CNS is an advanced practice registered nurse (APRN) with graduate preparation (earned master's or doctorate) from a program that prepares CNSs. The National Association of Clinical Nurse Specialists (NACNS) announced in July 2015 its endorsement of proposals for the Doctor of Nursing Practice (DNP) as the required degree for CNS entry into practice by 2030. According to the Consensus Model for APRN Regulation (2008), "The CNS has a unique APRN role to integrate care across the continuum and through three spheres of influence: patient, nurse, system. The three spheres are overlapping and interrelated, but each sphere possesses a distinctive focus. In each of the spheres of influence, the primary goal of the CNS is continuous improvement of patient outcomes and nursing care. Key elements of CNS practice are to create environments through mentoring and (p. 8) system changes that empower nurses to develop caring, evidence-based practices to alleviate patient distress, facilitate ethical decision-making, and respond to diversity. The CNS is responsible and accountable for diagnosis and treatment of health/illness states, disease management, health promotion, and prevention of illness and risk behaviors among individuals, families, groups, and communities." (p. 9). CNSs are clinical experts in a specialized area of nursing practice and in the delivery of evidence-based nursing interventions.

A systematic review published in 2011 identified 11 studies from the US (four RCTs and seven observational) that had looked at the possible effect of having CNS as part of the healthcare team. The reviewers found some evidence of reduced length of stay and costs of care for teams that included a CNS.

== Overview ==
CNSs work with other nurses to advance their nursing practices, improve outcomes, and provide clinical expertise to effect system-wide changes to improve programs of care. CNSs work in specialties that are defined by one of the following categories:

- Population (e.g. pediatrics, geriatrics, women's health)
- Setting (e.g. critical care, emergency department, long-term care)
- Disease or medical subspecialty (e.g. diabetes, oncology, palliative)
- Type of care (e.g. psychiatric, rehabilitation)
- Type of problem (e.g. pain, wounds, palliative)
- Genomics and Precision Medicine(e.g. Oncology CNS engaged with BRCA positive patients during targeted therapies)

=== Spheres of influence ===
There are three domains of CNS practice, known as the three spheres of influence (Mayo, et al., 2017; NACNS 2004):

- Patient
- Nursing personnel
- System (healthcare system)

The three spheres are overlapping and interrelated, but each sphere possesses a distinctive focus. In each of the spheres of influence, the primary goal of the CNS is continuous improvement of patient outcomes and nursing care.

=== Core competencies ===
Within the three spheres of CNS practice, Sparacino (2005) identified seven core competencies:

1. Direct clinical practice includes expertise in advanced assessment, implementing nursing care, and evaluating outcomes.
2. Expert coaching and guidance encompasses modeling clinical expertise while helping nurses integrate new evidence into practice. It also means providing education or teaching skills to patients and family.
3. Collaboration focuses on multidisciplinary team building.
4. Consultation involves reviewing alternative approaches and implementing planned change.
5. Research involves interpreting and using research, evaluating practice, and collaborating in research.
6. Clinical and professional leadership involves responsibility for innovation and change in the patient care system.
7. Ethical decision-making involves influence in negotiating moral dilemmas, allocating resources, directing patient care and access to care.

Although these core competencies have been described in the literature, they have not been validated through a review process that is objective and decisive. They are the opinions of some within the profession. A set of core competencies has now been described and validated through a consensus process (2008) that clearly defines the spheres of influence, the synergy model and the competencies as defined by Sparacino (2005). These core competencies are now expected to be used in all educational programs and will be revised in the coming years in order to be maintained as current and reflective of practice. The 2010 Adult-Gerontology Clinical Nurse Specialist Core Competencies revision reflects the work of a national Expert Panel, representing the array of both adult and gerontology clinical nurse specialist education and practice. In collaboration with colleagues from the Hartford Geriatric Nursing Institute at New York University and the National Association of Clinical Nurse Specialists (NACNS), the American Association of Colleges of Nursing (AACN) facilitated the process to develop these consensus-based competencies, including the work of the national Expert Panel and the external validation process. Pivotal to the full practice authority of CNSs in the United States as intended by the APRN Consensus Model implementation is the inclusion in the core competencies of the Clinical Nurse Specialists the crucial role of prescribing medications and durable medical equipment. The authoritative 2010 CNS core competencies document states that the clinical nurse specialist prescribes nursing therapeutics, pharmacologic and non-pharmacologic interventions, diagnostic measures, equipment, procedures, and treatments to meet the needs of patients, families and groups, in accordance with professional preparation, institutional privileges, state and federal laws, and practice acts.

== International perspectives ==
Historically, in North America, the CNS role developed within the acute care (hospital) setting. Currently, in addition to the traditional acute care setting, CNSs practice in a variety of non-acute care settings.

In the Australian health system, however, a clinical nurse specialist refers to a promotional position, rather than a qualification.
