= Marguerite M. Engler =

American nurse scientist and physiologist (1956–2023)

- Born: 1956; Washington, D.C., U.S.
- Died: March 9, 2023 (aged 67)
- Education: Marymount University; American University; Georgetown University
- Scientific career
- Fields: Nursing science, physiology
- Workplaces: University of California, San Francisco; National Institutes of Health; Uniformed Services University of the Health Sciences

Marguerite Maryanne Engler (1956 – March 9, 2023) was an American nurse scientist and physiologist who was a professor in the Graduate School of Nursing at the Uniformed Services University of the Health Sciences. She was previously the acting scientific director of the National Institute of Nursing Research's division of intramural research in 2012.

== Early life and education ==
Engler was born in 1956 in Washington, D.C. to Dorothy Jeane Engler (née Johnston) and Frank Robert Engler, a colonel in the U.S. military. She earned an Associate of Applied Science (A.A.S.) in Nursing from Marymount University in 1975. Engler pursued a Bachelor of Science (B.S.) degree in biology at the American University College of Arts and Sciences (AU), from 1975 to 1978. She continued her studies at AU, obtaining a Master of Science (M.S.) in biology/physiology from 1978 to 1981. Pamela Baker was chairman of her master's thesis titled, Evaluation of Cardiac Function Following Aortic Valve Replacement.

Engler completed her Ph.D. in physiology at Georgetown University School of Medicine's department of physiology and biophysics between 1982 and 1988. Engler conducted her doctoral research training at the National Heart, Lung, and Blood Institute and the National Institute on Alcohol Abuse and Alcoholism. Her dissertation was titled, The Effects of Dietary Alpha-or-Gamma-Linolenic Acid on Fatty Acid Composition and Prostanoid Metabolism in Rat Aorta and Platelets Following Ethanol Exposure. Her doctoral research found that feeding rats certain healthy fats, especially gamma-linolenic acid (GLA), helped protect against changes in blood vessels and platelets caused by alcohol, by increasing important fatty acids and improving the production of substances that help regulate blood flow.

== Career ==
Engler was a registered nurse. Her academic career began at the University of California, San Francisco (UCSF), where she held several positions in the UCSF School of Nursing's Department of Physiological Nursing. From 1988 to 1993, Engler served as an assistant professor, after which she was promoted to associate professor and earned tenure, a position she held from 1993 to 2000. Engler later became a tenured professor at UCSF, a role she maintained from 2000 to 2011. From 1993 to 2010, she was the editor-in-chief of Progress in Cardiovascular Nursing.

In 2011, Engler joined the National Institutes of Health (NIH), specifically the National Institute of Nursing Research (NINR), Division of Intramural Research. At NINR, she was appointed senior clinician in the symptom management branch, where she led the cardiovascular unit from 2011 to 2014. In addition, she served as acting scientific director from June to August 2012 and acting deputy scientific director from 2011 to 2014. She held the position of deputy scientific director and chief of the cardiovascular symptoms unit at NIH.

Engler's research was focused on cardiovascular symptoms and physiological responses, contributing significantly to the field of symptom management, particularly within cardiovascular care. Her work focused on nutritional interventions to stem the tide of cardiovascular disease, and she defined many biomarkers of vascular health, endothelial function, and vascular aging. She was recognized for her leadership in the management of clinical research at the NIH and earned a Fellowship in the American Academy of Nursing (FAAN) for her contributions to nursing science. Engler was a professor in the Graduate School of Nursing at the Uniformed Services University of the Health Sciences. She taught in its Ph.D. in nursing science program.

Engler died on March 9, 2023, at the age of 67.
