= Shannon Zenk =

American nurse scientist

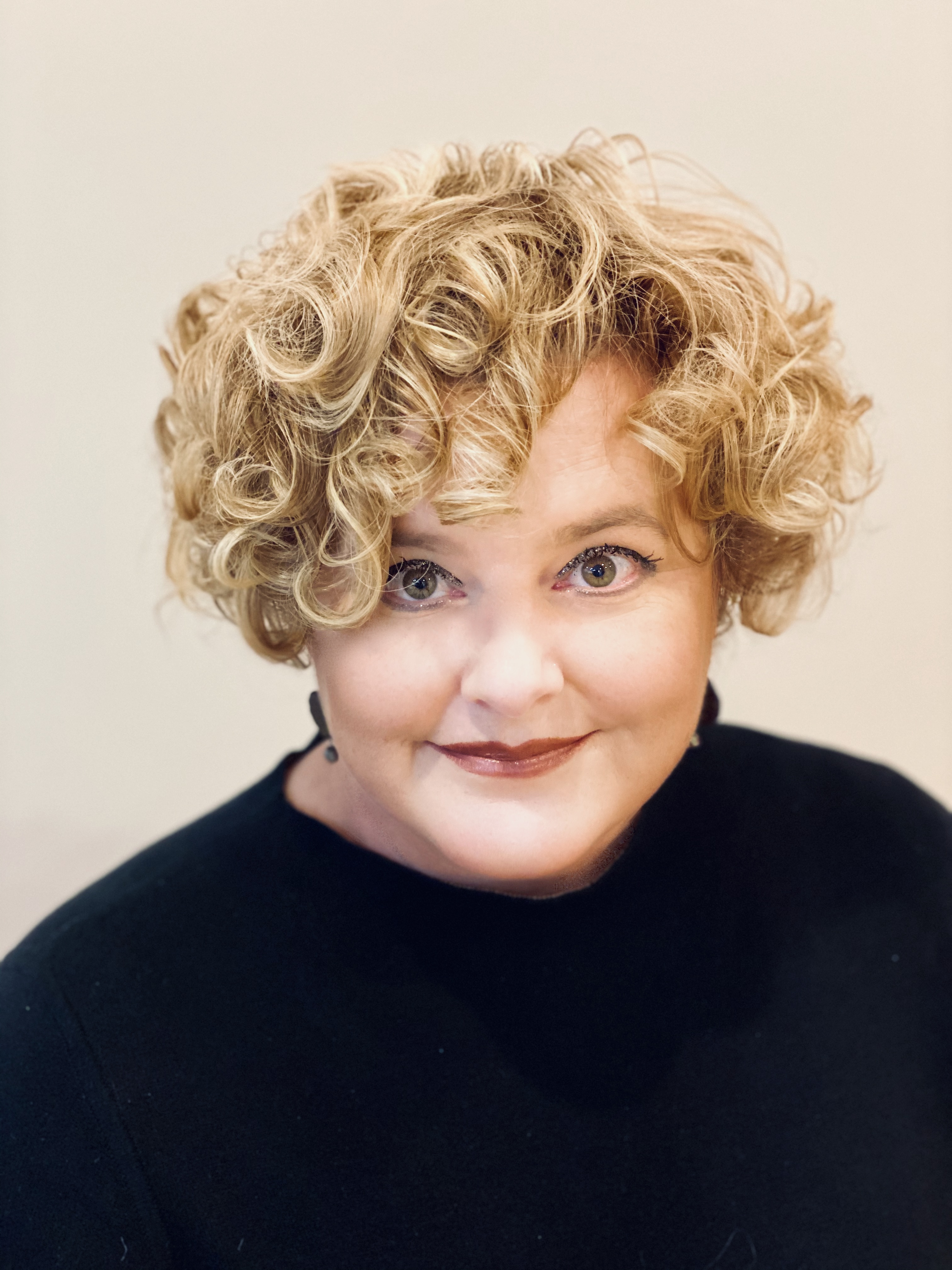

Director of the National Institute of Nursing Research
- Incumbent
- Assumed office October 14, 2020
- Preceded by: Tara A. Schwetz (acting)

Personal details
- Born: Shannon Nicole Zenk
- Education: Illinois Wesleyan University (BS); University of Illinois, Chicago (MS, MPH); University of Michigan (PhD)

Shannon Nicole Zenk is an American nurse scientist specialized in researching social inequities and health disparities. She is director of the National Institute of Nursing Research from September 2020. She is currently in administrative leave

== Education ==
Zenk earned her bachelor’s in nursing, magna cum laude, from Illinois Wesleyan University; her master’s degrees in public health nursing and community health sciences from University of Illinois Chicago (UIC); and her doctorate in health behavior and health education from the University of Michigan. Her predoctoral training was in psychosocial factors in mental health and illness, funded by the National Institute of Mental Health. Her dissertation examined racial and socioeconomic inequities in food access in metropolitan Detroit. She completed postdoctoral training in UIC’s Institute for Health Research and Policy’s Cancer Education and Career Development Program, funded by the National Cancer Institute, in 2006.

== Career ==
Zenk was a nursing collegiate professor in the department of population health nursing science at the University of Illinois Chicago (UIC) College of Nursing, and a fellow at the UIC Institute for Health Research and Policy. She has spent time as a visiting scholar in Rwanda and Australia.

Sworn in on October 14, 2020, Zenk succeeded acting director Tara A. Schwetz as director of the National Institute of Nursing Research (NINR).

On March 31 during the 2025 United States federal mass layoffs, Zenk was placed on administrative leave.

== Research ==
Zenk's research focuses on social inequities and health with a goal of identifying effective, multilevel approaches to improve health and eliminate racial/ethnic and socioeconomic health disparities. Her research portfolio has included NIH-supported work into urban food environments, community health solutions and veterans’ health. Through pioneering research on the built environment and food deserts, Zenk and her colleagues increased national attention to the problem of inadequate access to healthful foods in low-income and Black neighborhoods. They have since examined the role of community environments in health and health disparities. Recognizing that restricting empirical attention to the communities where people live and not the other communities where they spend time may misdirect interventions, Zenk led early research adopting GPS tracking to study broader "activity space" environments in relation to health behaviors. She and her colleagues have also evaluated whether the effectiveness of behavioral interventions differs depending on environmental context and, most recently, how environmental and personal factors interact to affect health. This work has leveraged a variety of technologies and emerging data resources such as electronic health records. Energy balance-related behaviors and conditions have been a major focus.

== Awards and honors ==
Zenk was elected as a fellow of the American Academy of Nursing in 2013, received the President’s Award from the Friends of the National Institute of Nursing Research in 2018, and was inducted into the Sigma Theta Tau International Nurse Researchers Hall of Fame in 2019. In 2022, Zenk was elected to the National Academy of Medicine.
