= National Institute of Nursing Research =

U.S. health institute

National Institute of Nursing Research (NINR)

Agency overview
- Jurisdiction: Federal Government of the United States
- Agency executive: Vacant
- Parent department: Department of Health and Human Services
- Parent agency: National Institutes of Health
- Website: www.ninr.nih.gov

The National Institute of Nursing Research (NINR), as part of the U.S. National Institutes of Health, supports clinical and basic research to establish a scientific basis for the nursing care of individuals across the life span—from management of patients during illness and recovery, to the reduction of risks for disease and disability, and the promotion of healthy lifestyles.

== History ==
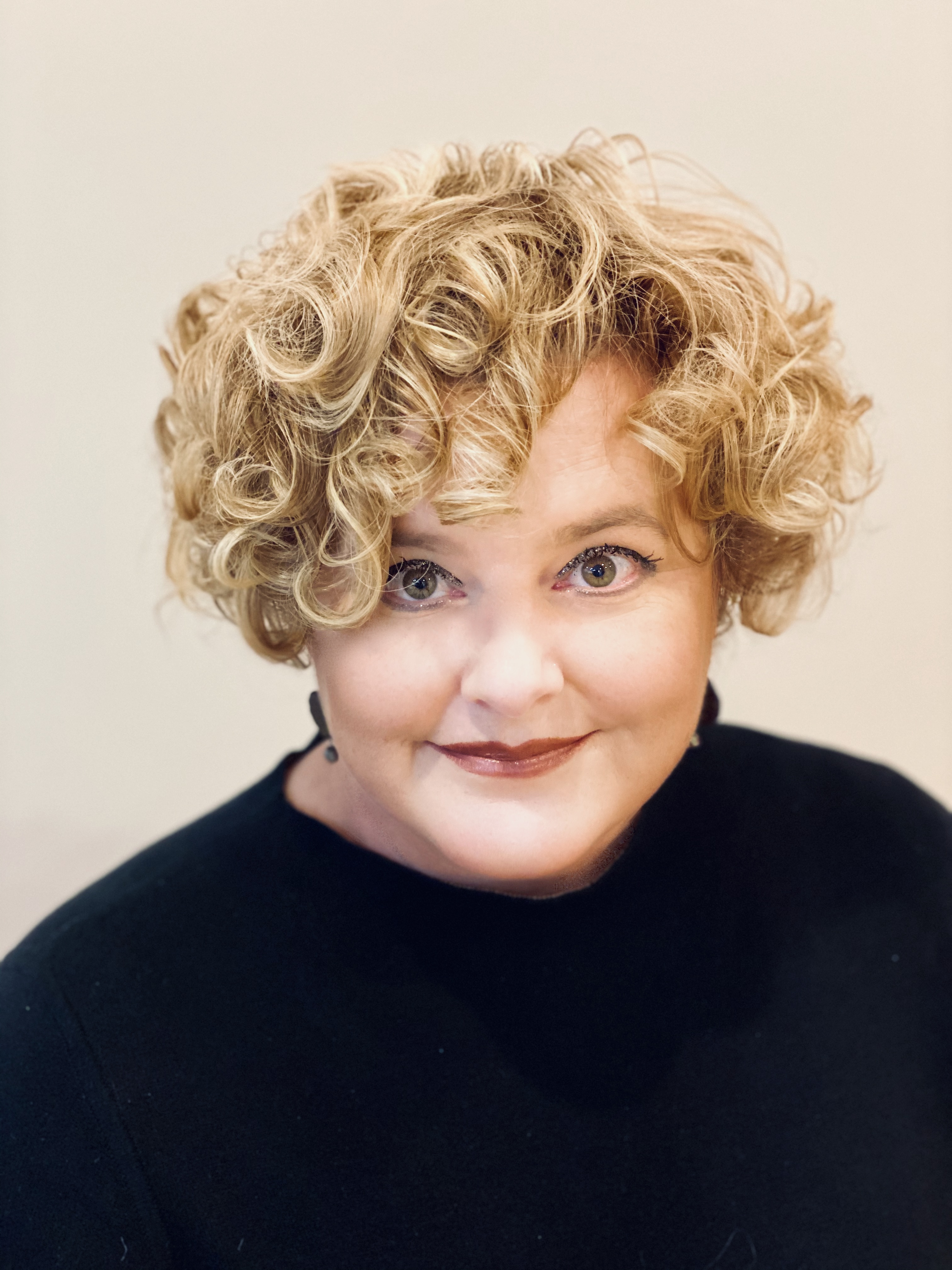
Former NINR director Shannon Zenk

Federal involvement in nursing research can be traced back to 1946, with the establishment of the Division of Nursing within the Office of the Surgeon General, Public Health Service.

In 1955, the first extramural nursing research program was established in the Research Grants and Fellowship Branch of the Division of Nursing Resources, Bureau of Medical Services. At this same time, the National Institutes of Health (NIH) established the Nursing Research Study Section within the Division of Research Grants to conduct scientific review of the growing volume of applications in this area.

In 1960, public health nursing services were consolidated to form a new Division of Nursing in the Bureau of State Services, whose successor is now within the Health Resources and Services Administration (HRSA) – the agency responsible for clinical training in the health care professions. The initial and continuing goal of federal support was to build a foundation for nursing research. During this time, many academic institutions established predoctoral and postdoctoral fellowship programs to train independent nurse investigators. Nursing research programs were also funded and research information was exchanged across the country.

The impetus for establishing the National Institute of Nursing Research (NINR) came from the findings of two federal studies. A 1983 report by the Institute of Medicine recommended that nursing research be included in the mainstream of biomedical and behavioral science, and a 1984 NIH Task Force study found nursing research activities to be relevant to the NIH mission. These findings resulted in legislative action that established the National Center for Nursing Research (NCNR) at NIH in April 1986. The Center later became an NIH Institute with the NIH Revitalization Act of 1993 and a Federal Register notice on June 14 of that year – both actions formally changing the NCNR to the NINR.

Dr. Patricia A. Grady served as director of NINR from 1995 to 2018. Dr. Shannon Zenk became Director of NINR in September 2020. Shannon Zenk was placed on administrative leave as part of the Health and Human Services Department’s massive layoffs in April, 2025

== Directors ==
Past directors from 1986 - present

No.	Portrait	Director	Took office	Left office	Refs.
acting		Doris Honig Merritt	April 18, 1986	June 1987	
1		Ada Sue Hinshaw	June 6, 1987	June 30, 1994	
acting		Suzanne S. Hurd	July 1, 1994	April 2, 1995	
2		Patricia A. Grady	April 3, 1995	August 31, 2018	
acting		Ann K. Cashion	September 1, 2018	September 30, 2019	
acting		Lawrence A. Tabak	October 1, 2019	December 31, 2019	
acting		Tara A. Schwetz	January 1, 2020	September 13, 2020	
3		Shannon N. Zenk	September 14, 2020	April 1, 2025	
acting		Courtney Aklin	April 1, 2025	present	

== Notable people ==
- Ann K. Cashion, acting director, NINR, 2018–2019
- Jessica Gill, acting deputy director, NINR, 2019–2020
- Patricia A. Grady, director, NINR, 1995–2018
- Marguerite Littleton Kearney, director, NINR Division of Extramural Science Programs, 2015–present
- Ada Sue Hinshaw, director, NINR, 1987–1994
- Tara A. Schwetz, acting director, NINR, 2020
- Shannon N. Zenk, director, NINR, 2020-present
- Ora L. Strickland, Founding member, NINR
