= Marguerite Littleton Kearney =

American nurse and scientist

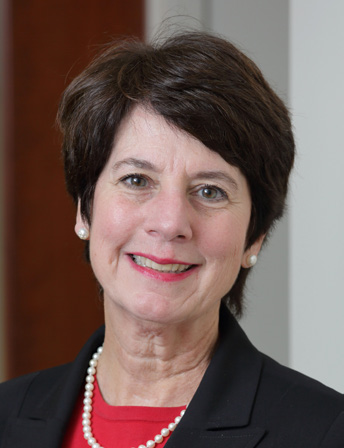
- Education: Augusta University (B.S.N., M.S.N.); Rush University (Ph.D.)
- Scientific career
- Workplaces: Rush College of Nursing; University of Maryland; Johns Hopkins School of Nursing; Uniformed Services University of the Health Sciences; National Institute of Nursing Research

Marguerite T. Littleton Kearney is an American nurse scientist. She is the director of the National Institute of Nursing Research's Division of Extramural Science Programs. Littleton Kearney was the associate dean for research at the Uniformed Services University of the Health Sciences Graduate School of Nursing.

== Education ==
Littleton Kearney earned a B.S.N. and an M.S.N. in adult care/trauma nursing from Augusta University. She earned her Ph.D. and completed a post-doctoral fellowship in the Departments of Nursing and Pharmacology at Rush University.

== Career ==
Littleton Kearney held faculty positions at Rush College of Nursing and University of Maryland. She was an associate professor at the Johns Hopkins School of Nursing. Littleton Kearney was the associate dean for research at the Daniel K. Inouye Graduate School of Nursing at the Uniformed Services University of the Health Sciences.

In 2015, Littleton Kearney was named the director of the National Institute of Nursing Research (NINR)'s Division of Extramural Science Programs (DESP). Littleton Kearney is responsible for leading, managing and actively coordinating NINR’s extramural scientific programs, grants management, scientific merit review, and advisory council operations. She leads the activities of the DESP, which includes the Office of Extramural Programs, the Office of End-of-Life and Palliative Care and the Office of Extramural Research Administration.

=== Research ===
Littleton Kearney's area of research interest is in the effects of female hormones on cerebrovascular recovery after cerebral injury. Her interdisciplinary research, which was funded by NINR since 1996, focused on the effects of sex hormones on cerebral vessel recovery after ischemic cerebral injury. She has served on NIH study sections in support of the scientific peer review process. In 2018, Littleton Kearney and Patricia A. Grady co-authored a Nursing Outlook editorial summarizing "The Science of Caregiving: Bringing Voices Together" Summit, held August 7 and 8, 2017 and the role of research in addressing issues related to caregiving. Littleton Kearney and Grady note in the editorial, "This caregiving summit taps into a strong societal health challenge, catalyzes an essential conversation, and provides guideposts for moving forward as caregiving occupies an even more central part of the health-care landscape."

== Awards and honors ==
In 2001, Littleton Kearney became a fellow of the American Academy of Nursing. In 2017, Littleton Kearney was named the recipient of Augusta University College of Nursing’s (formerly the Medical College of Georgia College of Nursing) Phoebe Kandel Rohrer Distinguished Alumna award. It was presented during the university’s alumni weekend.
