= Elizabeth J. Corwin =

American nurse scientist and family nurse practitioner

- Education: University of Michigan; University of New Mexico
- Scientific career
- Fields: Nursing research
- Workplaces: Nell Hodgson Woodruff School of Nursing; Columbia University School of Nursing

Elizabeth J. Corwin is an American nurse scientist and family nurse practitioner. She is the Anna C. Maxwell Professor of Nursing Research and Vice Dean of Strategic and Innovative Research at Columbia University School of Nursing. Corwin previously held the Edith F. Honeycutt Chair in Nursing at Emory University. She is the principal investigator on NIH-funded R01 studies funded by the National Institutes of Health in the United States. She is not only an active scientist but also a doctoral supervisor.

== Education ==
Corwin received a bachelor of science in zoology in 1977 at the University of Michigan. She completed a Ph.D. in physiology in 1981 at the Michigan Medicine. During her postdoctoral fellowship, she was introduced to clinical research, which inspired her to step out of her faculty position to return to school for a bachelor’s degree in nursing and become a family nurse practitioner. She completed a B.S.N. (1993) and M.S.N. (1996) at the University of New Mexico.

== Career ==
In 2017, Corwin was made the Edith F. Honeycutt Chair in Nursing at Emory University. She served as the associate dean for research at the Nell Hodgson Woodruff School of Nursing. In 2019, Corwin joined the Columbia University School of Nursing in 2019 as the Anna C. Maxwell Professor of Nursing Research and Vice Dean of Strategic and Innovative Research.

Corwin leads interdisciplinary research focusing on the biological, behavioral and environmental impacts on maternal health in underserved and socially disadvantaged populations. Her recent work focuses on the role of the microbiome in birth outcomes. Throughout her research career, she has combined her expertise as a basic scientist with her experience caring for women and families across the lifespan.

== Awards and honors ==
Corwin is an elected fellow of the American Academy of Nursing in 2013. In 2016, she was inducted into the Sigma Theta Tau International Nurse Researcher Hall of Fame.
