= Cashion =

Cashion can refer to:

== People ==
- Ann Cashion, American chef
- Ann K. Cashion, American nurse scientist
- Red Cashion (1931–2019), American football official

== Places ==
=== United States ===
- Cashion, Arizona
- Cashion, Oklahoma
- Cashion Community, Texas
