= Jessica Gill (nurse) =

American nurse scientist

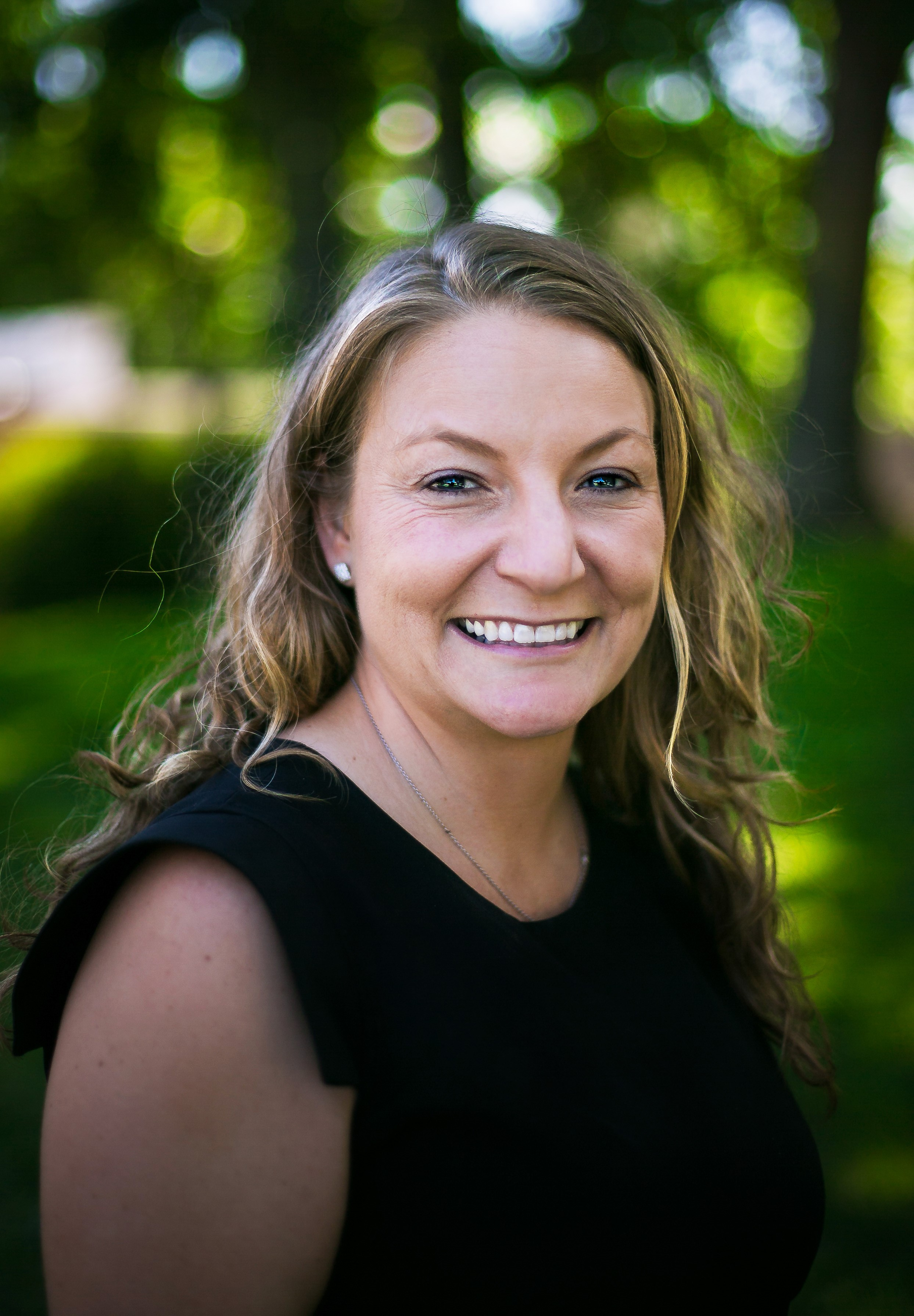
- Gill in 2018
- Education: Linfield College; Oregon Health & Science University; Johns Hopkins School of Nursing
- Scientific career
- Fields: Nursing, neurology
- Workplaces: Uniformed Services University of the Health Sciences; National Institute of Nursing Research; Johns Hopkins University
- Doctoral advisor: Gayle Page

Jessica M. Gill is an American nurse scientist working as a Bloomberg Distinguished Professor of Trauma Recovery Biomarkers in the department of neurology at the Johns Hopkins School of Nursing and School of Medicine since 2021. She was the acting deputy director of the National Institute of Nursing Research from 2019 to 2020 and deputy director of the Center for Neuroscience and Regenerative Medicine at the Uniformed Services University of the Health Sciences until 2021.

== Education ==
Gill completed a B.S.N. with a minor in biology in 1998 at Linfield College. While there, she volunteered with women and children whose lives were negatively affected by violence. Gill observed that this extreme stress resulted in differing outcomes with some women being substantially impaired, whereas others were able to recover. She questioned the mechanisms underlying these divergent responses to extreme stress. She completed a M.S. in psychiatric nursing in 2001 from the Oregon Health & Science University, which included clinical training in the PTSD program at the U.S. Department of Veterans Affairs.

Research questions about trauma and resiliency were increased during her work with Vietnam veterans who remained impacted by their combat service decades after returning home. Gill completed a Ph.D. at the Johns Hopkins School of Nursing in 2007. Her doctoral advisor was Gayle Page. Her dissertation research demonstrated the presence of high rates of PTSD in urban health care seeking women, and that a PTSD diagnosis was associated with perceived health declines as well as with higher concentrations of inflammatory markers and a dysregulation of endocrine functioning. She was a postdoctoral researcher at the National Institute of Nursing Research (NINR) to examine the biological mechanisms of PTSD and depression. Gill studied central and peripheral alterations in the in-vivo functioning of both immune and endocrine systems.

== Career ==
Gill was a clinical investigator in the Center for Neuroscience and Regenerative Medicine (CNRM) at the Uniformed Services University of the Health Sciences. At the CNRM, her program of research and clinical practice expanded to examining the biological mechanisms of PTSD and traumatic brain injury related impairments in service members where, again, she observed a high degree of differential response to combat trauma and TBIs. This experience led to questions regarding the mechanisms underlying these differential responses, a line of inquiry that could only be determined using a prospective design of patients immediately following a trauma.

Gill returned to NINR as a Lasker Clinical Research Scholar to develop this program of research, which aims to determine the clinical and biological risks that predict PTSD onset and neurological compromise following a traumatic injury. She served as chief of the NINR brain injury unit. Gill extended the reach of her science through the development of several collaborations including leading the biomarker core for the National Collegiate Athlete Association CARE Consortium, co-directing the Center for Neuroscience and Regenerative Medicine, and leading the biomarkers core for the Chronic Effects of Neurotrauma Consortium. In 2018, she published a study in the Brain, Behavior, and Immunity, where she was the first to report that blast exposure results in a unique profile of protein changes, including changes in tau, phosphorylated tau, and amyloid-beta. This research suggests that tau and amyloid-beta activity following blast initiate neurodegenerative processes that may underlie chronic symptoms. In July 2018, Gill was appointed deputy scientific director of the division of intramural research at the National Institute of Nursing Research (NINR). From 2019 to 2020, she was the acting NINR deputy director. She became the deputy director of the CNRM in 2019.

In 2021, she joined Johns Hopkins School of Nursing and the School of Medicine as a Bloomberg Distinguished Professor of Trauma Recovery Biomarkers in the department of neurology. She was elected to the National Academy of Medicine in 2021.
