= Derek C. Angus =

American-based, British medical scientist

- Born: Derek Calder Angus; 1962 (age 63–64); Glasgow, Scotland
- Education: University of Glasgow
- Occupations: Chief Healthcare Innovation Officer, Medical Scientist, Editor
- Organization(s): UPMC, JAMA, University of Pittsburgh, University of Paris
- Relatives: Michael Angus

Derek Calder Angus (born 1962) is an American-based, British medical scientist, whose work focuses on clinical, epidemiologic and translational studies of sepsis, pneumonia, multisystem organ failure and the organization and delivery of critical care services.

Scottish-born and trained, but associated with the University of Pittsburgh since 1989, he is currently that institution's Distinguished Professor and holder of the Mitchell P. Fink Chair at the Department of Critical Care Medicine.

In June 2020, Dr. Angus was appointed as the first UPMC Chief Healthcare Innovation Officer (CHIO). He has been an editor for JAMA since 2007.

== Research ==
Dr. Angus is one of the world's leading researchers in the field of critical care medicine. His seminal research on the recognition, pathophysiology, and treatment of Sepsis has led to a dramatic decline in sepsis mortality worldwide through the Surviving Sepsis Campaign.

Beyond sepsis, his specialties include the epidemiologic, economic and health services research aspects of critical illness, intensive care unit (ICU) organization and delivery. He has studied the development and application of cost-effectiveness analysis in critical care, the capability and impact of alternative ICU organizational models, traditional and novel ICU risk prediction tools and the incidence, cost and short- and long-term outcomes of critical illnesses such as sepsis and respiratory failure.

He has authored or co-authored more than 500 papers and abstracts received several awards and honors for his research and has lectured at scientific congresses nationally and internationally. Dr. Angus is a member of many professional societies including the Royal College of Physicians and is a fellow of the American College of Chest Physicians and the American College of Critical Care Medicine.

== Personal life ==
Derek C. Angus is married to public health expert, Julie Donohue, and has three children and two step-children and a dog (Alistair).
