= Ann King Cashion =

American nurse scientist

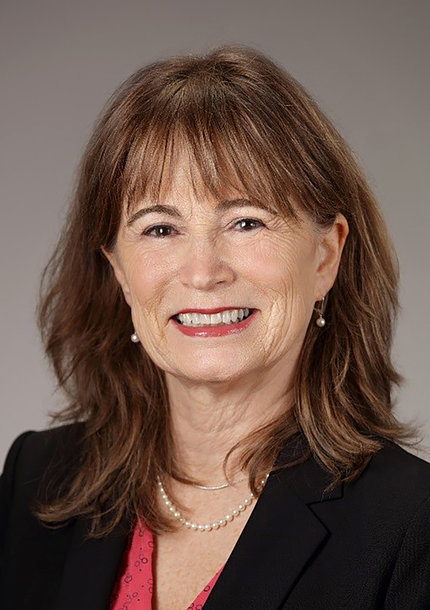
- Cashion in 2019

Director of the National Institute of Nursing Research
- Acting
- In office September 2018 – September 2019
- Preceded by: Patricia A. Grady
- Succeeded by: Lawrence A. Tabak (acting)

Personal details
- Education: University of North Carolina at Chapel Hill; University of Arkansas for Medical Sciences; University of Tennessee Health Science Center

Ann King Cashion is an American nurse scientist specialized in genetic markers that predict clinical outcomes. She is a professor emerita in the department of health promotion/disease prevention at the University of Tennessee Health Science Center. Cashion was the acting director of the National Institute of Nursing Research from 2018 to 2019.

== Life ==
Cashion completed a B.S.N. in Nursing at the University of North Carolina at Chapel Hill in 1978. She earned a MNSc in Nursing/Adult at the University of Arkansas for Medical Sciences. Cashion practiced as a critical care nurse and clinical nurse specialist for nearly two decades in Little Rock, Arkansas. She completed a Ph.D. in Nursing at the University of Tennessee Health Science Center in 1998. Her dissertation was titled Measurement of Autonomic Function in Renal Disease and Diabetes. Kay F. Engelhardt was her doctoral advisor. In 2000, she completed postdoctoral research in molecular genetics at the National Institute of Nursing Research and Georgetown University.

In 2000, Cashion joined the faculty of the College of Nursing at the University of Tennessee Health Science Center (UTHSC). From 2008 to 2013, she was a professor in the college of nursing. Cashion chaired the department of acute and chronic care from 2005 to 2012. In 2006, she was elected a fellow of the American Academy of Nursing. During her tenure there, Cashion researched social, environmental and genetic markers to predict patient outcomes and guide therapies in solid organ transplant recipients. She researched the factors leading to post-transplant weight gain. Her expertise is in genetic markers that predict clinical outcomes, in particular the genetic/genomic and environmental components associated with outcomes of organ transplantation.

Cashion conducted research combining genomic technologies, including microarrays, with behavioral questionnaires to study gene–environment interactions associated with obesity among kidney transplant recipients during the first year after transplantation. She later served as lead investigator of the NINR’s Genomic and Clinical Biomarkers Laboratory, where her work applied the NIH Symptom Science Model to identify biomarkers related to risk stratification across multiple health outcomes. She served as president of the International Society of Nurses in Genetics.

Cashion joined the National Institute of Nursing Research (NINR) in 2011 as a senior advisor to then-NINR director Patricia A. Grady. She served as acting scientific director before being appointed permanently in November 2013. She was named NINR acting deputy director in January 2018. Cashion was the acting NINR director from September 2018 until September 30, 2019. Lawrence A. Tabak succeeded Cashion as the acting NINR director.

On July 1, 2020, Cashion rejoined the UTHSC as a professor in the college of nursing. As of 2022, she is a professor emerita in the department of health promotion/disease prevention.
