= Jennifer Webster-Cyriaque =

American dentist and immunologist

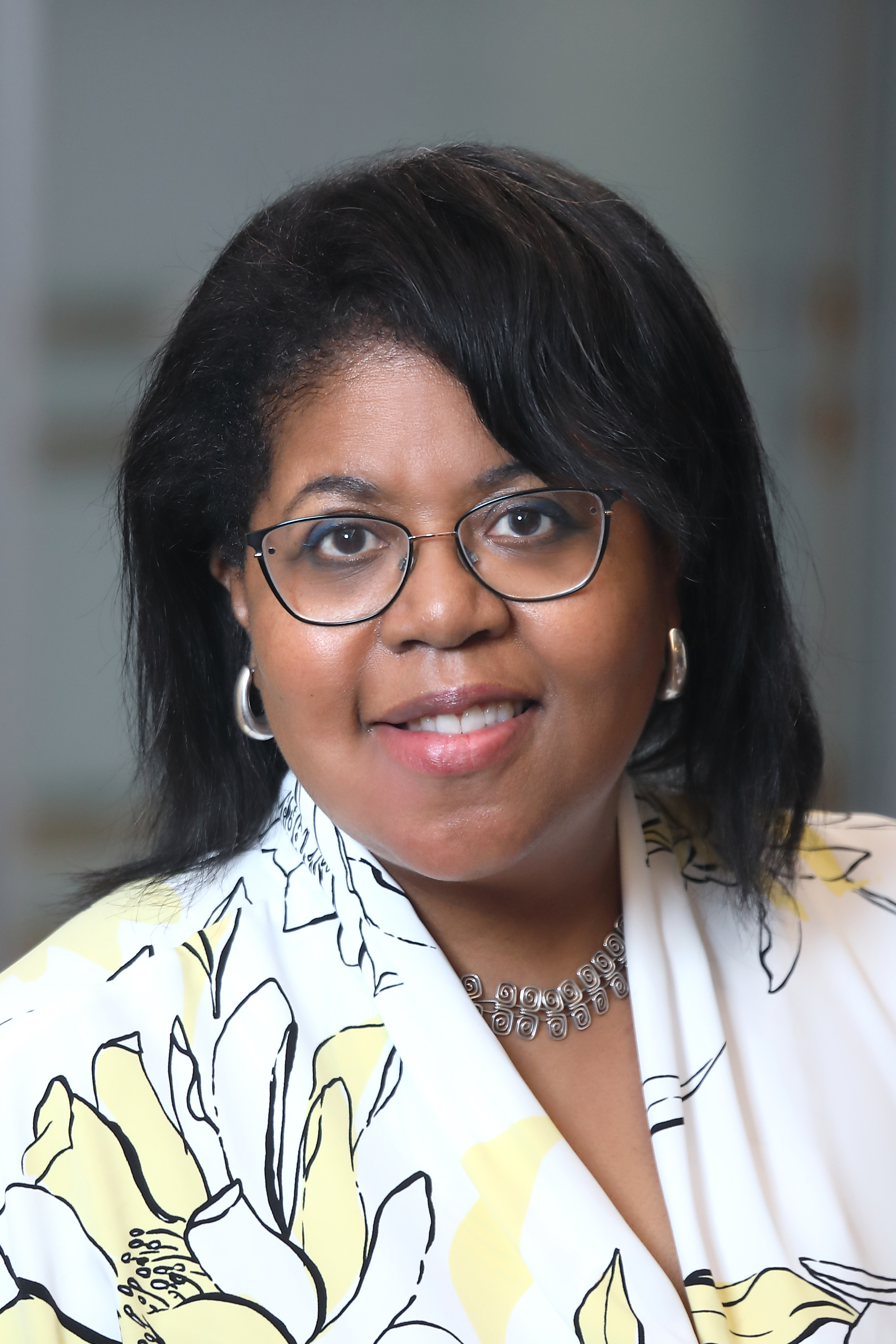
- Education: University at Buffalo; University of North Carolina at Chapel Hill
- Scientific career
- Fields: Oral microbiome, immunology, HIV
- Workplaces: University of North Carolina; National Institute of Dental and Craniofacial Research
- Thesis: The role of Epstein-Barr virus in hairy leukoplakia and other AIDS associated oral mucosal lesions (1998)
- Doctoral advisor: Nancy Raab-Traub

Jennifer Y. Webster-Cyriaque is an American dentist and immunologist specializing in the oral microbiome, salivary gland disease in patients with HIV, and cancer-causing viruses. She became the deputy director of the National Institute of Dental and Craniofacial Research in November 2020. Webster-Cyriaque was a faculty member at UNC Adams School of Dentistry and the UNC School of Medicine for 21 years.

== Education ==
Webster-Cyriaque completed a B.A. in biology and social science in 1988 and a D.D.S. from University at Buffalo in 1992. She earned a doctorate in microbiology and immunology from the University of North Carolina at Chapel Hill (UNC) in 1998. Her dissertation was titled The role of Epstein–Barr virus in hairy leukoplakia and other AIDS associated oral mucosal lesions. Nancy Raab-Traub was her doctoral advisor.

== Career ==
Webster-Cyriaque has been part of the UNC Adams School of Dentistry's and the UNC School of Medicine's faculty for over twenty years. Webster-Cyriaque is one of the UNC's tenured full professors. She supported the UNC Hospital’s dental clinic and she investigated a potential cause for a salivary gland disease in HIV patients. She assessed the oral microbiome's implications for Oncoviruses, and its impact on the HIV patient's oral health.

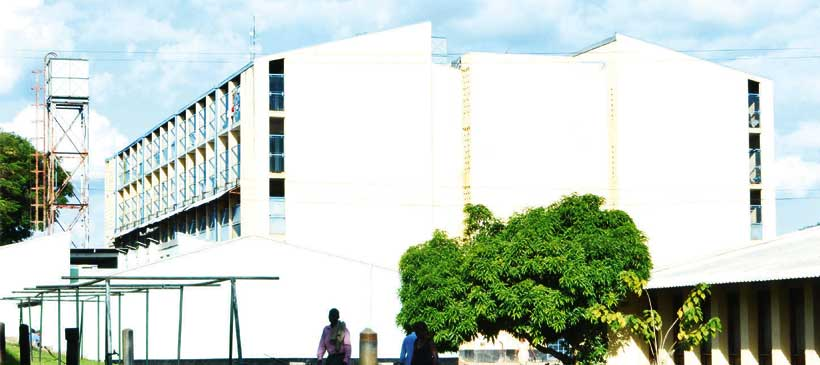
The "UNC Malawi project" is based at Kamuzu Central Hospital

In 2004, she became responsible for the "UNC Malawi project". The project is a partnership between the Malawi Ministry of Health (led by Khumbize Chiponda since 2020) and the UNC. The UNC Malawi Project is based in the country's capital at the Kamuzu Central Hospital. Webster-Cyriaque assisted in creating Malawi's first dental school in 2019. Webster-Cyriaque was the chair/vice chair of the Oral HIV/AIDS Research Alliance, the research director at the National Dental Association Foundation, and director of postdoctoral Clinical and Translational Science Award training. She is an active member of the American Association for Dental, Oral, and Craniofacial Research and the International Association for Dental Research.

In March 2020 during the COVID-19 pandemic Webster-Cyriaque was involved with research at the Adams School of Dentistry at the UNC to see if mouthwash could be used to inactivate the COVID-19 virus. Later that year she became the National Institute of Dental and Craniofacial Research's deputy director under the new Director Rena D’Souza. In 2022, Webster-Cyriaque received the International Association for Dental Research Distinguished Scientist Oral Pathology and Medicine Research Award. The same year, she was named to the National Academy of Medicine for For making seminal contributions to the understanding of the role of virus-host interaction in oral disease.
