= Advanced Research Projects Agency for Health =

United States federal agency

Agency overview
- Formed: March 15, 2022; 4 years ago
- Jurisdiction: Federal government of the United States
- Agency executive: Alicia Jackson, Director
- Parent department: Department of Health and Human Services
- Website: arpa-h.gov

The Advanced Research Projects Agency for Health (ARPA-H) is an agency within the United States Department of Health and Human Services. Its mission is to "make pivotal investments in break-through technologies and broadly applicable platforms, capabilities, resources, and solutions that have the potential to transform important areas of medicine and health for the benefit of all patients and that cannot readily be accomplished through traditional research or commercial activity."

ARPA-H was approved by Congress with the passing of H.R. 2471, the Consolidated Appropriations Act, 2022 and was signed into Public Law 117-103 by U.S. president Joe Biden on March 15, 2022. 15 days later Health and Human Services Secretary Xavier Becerra announced that the agency will have access to the resources of the National Institutes of Health, but will answer to the U.S. Secretary of Health and Human Services. The agency initially has a $1 billion budget to be used before fiscal year 2025 (October 2024) and the Biden administration has requested much more funding from Congress.

In December 2022, the Consolidated Appropriations Act, 2023 (Pub.L. 117–328) provided $1.5 billion for ARPA-H for fiscal year 2023. The Biden administration requested and received $2.5 billion for FY2024, and had spent $400 million in research grants by August 13, 2024.

In March 2023, ARPA-H announced one of its three headquarters locations would be in the Washington metropolitan area. In September 2023, ARPA-H announced that a second hub would be located in Cambridge, Massachusetts, following a bid led by U.S. representative Richard Neal from Massachusetts's 1st congressional district and University of Massachusetts System president Marty Meehan to have the agency locate a hub in the Greater Boston area. The third patient engagement-focused hub was established in Dallas, Texas.

== History ==
The Defense Advanced Research Projects Agency (DARPA, formerly ARPA) has been the military's in-house innovator since 1958, a year after the USSR launched Sputnik. DARPA is widely known for creating ARPAnet, the predecessor of the internet, and has been instrumental in advancing hardened electronics, brain-computer interface technology, drones, and stealth technology. Inspired by the success of DARPA, in 2002 the Homeland Security Advanced Research Projects Agency (HSARPA) was created and in 2006 the Intelligence Advanced Research Projects Activity (IARPA) was created. This was followed by the Advanced Research Projects Agency–Energy (ARPA-E) in 2009 and the Advanced Research Projects Agency–Infrastructure (ARPA-I) in 2022. DARPA also inspired the Advanced Research and Invention Agency in the UK and in 2021 the Biden administration proposed ARPA-C for climate research.

The Suzanne Wright Foundation proposed "HARPA" in 2017 to focus on pancreatic cancer and other challenging diseases. A white paper was published by former Obama White House staffers, Michael Stebbins and Geoffrey Ling through the Day One Project that proposed the creation of a new federal agency modeled on DARPA, but focused on health. That proposal was adopted by President Biden's campaign and was the model used for establishing ARPA-H. In June 2021 noted biologists Francis S. Collins (then head of the NIH), Tara Schwetz, Lawrence Tabak, and Eric Lander penned an article in Science supporting the idea. Dr. Collins became an important champion of the idea on Capitol Hill and the legislation garnered numerous sponsors in the 117th Congress.

In September 2022, Renee Wegrzyn was appointed as the agency's inaugural director. She was dismissed by the Trump administration in February 2025. Jason Roos served as acting director until Alicia Jackson's appointment as director in November 2025.

== Research ==
A White House white paper identifies a number of potential directions for technological development that could occur under the direction of ARPA-H, including cancer vaccines, pandemic preparedness, and prevention technologies, less intrusive wearable blood glucose monitors, and patient-specific T-cell therapies. Additionally, the proposal suggests that ARPA-H focus on platforms to reduce health disparities in maternal morbidity and mortality and improve how medications provided are taken.

One of the first grants from the organization was to its DIGIHEALS initiative for innovative research that aims to protect the United States health care system against hostile online threats. Christian Dameff and Jeff Tully, medical doctors and medical cybersecurity researchers at the University of California, San Diego School of Medicine, as well as cybersecurity expert Stefan Savage, were named investigators to the Healthcare Ransomware Resiliency and Response Program, or H-R3P, project.
