= Isabel Garcia (dentist) =

A. Isabel Garcia is an American dentist and academic administrator serving as dean of the University of Florida College of Dentistry since 2015. She was deputy director of the National Institute of Dental and Craniofacial Research (NIDCR) from 2007 to 2014. Garcia was the acting NIDCR director from 2010 to 2011. She was a Rear Admiral Lower Half in the U.S. Public Health Service Commissioned Corps.

== Education ==
Garcia completed a bachelor's degree in chemistry at the University of Mary Washington in 1976. She earned a doctor of dental science degree from the Medical College of Virginia in 1980. She earned a master's degree in public health from the University of Michigan School of Public Health in 1988. She completed a residency in dental public health at Michigan and a fellowship in primary care policy in the United States Public Health Service. Garcia has a career that spans more than 40 years in public health, clinical practice, research, teaching, and administration.

== Publications ==
Garcia has released a variety academic publications, with her most recent being "Use of Cannabis and Odds Ratio for Oropharyngeal and Oral Cancer-A Cohort Study" (2025). Other recent publications include "The use of chlorhexidine mouthwash and diagnosis of primary hypertension in a large hospital cohort" (2024) and "Reduced Odds Ratio for Oropharyngeal Cancer in Patients with a History of Human Papilloma Virus (HPV) Vaccination in a Large Hospital-based Population" (2023).

== Career ==
During the early 1980s, Garcia was in private practice in Richmond, Virginia. She held local and state health management positions, including county health director for the Virginia division of dental health and director of dental research and evaluation in the Ohio Department of Health. While working at a private practice with an associate of hers, Garcia was working overtime trying to start her own practice.

Garcia was a health scientist administrator at the Agency for Healthcare Research and Quality where she managed research on health services and primary care. Garcia joined the National Institute of Dental and Craniofacial Research (NIDCR) in 1995 as a special assistant for science transfer. She directed activities to promote science-based practice, developed science transfer activities for clinicians, and led the development of a curriculum supplement on oral health science for use by elementary school teachers. From 2004 to 2007, Garcia was director of the NIDCR office of science policy and analysis. A captain in the United States Public Health Service Commissioned Corps, she became the director of the dental public health residency program at NIDCR in 2005. Garcia is a diplomate of the American Board of Dental Public Health. In February 2007, she succeeded Dushanka Kleinman as the NIDCR deputy director. In 2010, Garcia succeeded Lawrence A. Tabak as acting NIDCR director. She was succeeded by Martha Somerman in 2011. She is a fellow of the American College of Dentists. Garcia retired from the Public Health Service as a rear admiral lower half in 2014.

At the University of Michigan School of Dentistry, Garcia took the role of an adjunct assistant professor and lecturer. Continuing her career as an adjunct assistant professor, she also worked at The Ohio State University under the College of Dentistry.

On February 16, 2015, Garcia became dean of the University of Florida College of Dentistry. She succeeded interim dean Boyd Robinson who had replaced dean Teresa A. Dolan. In 2024, as dean of the University of Florida College of Dentistry, Garcia helped in creating a program for dental student to learn how to use Artificial-Intelligence to help diagnose and treat dental problems.

== See also ==
- Women in dentistry in the United States
