= Teresa A. Dolan =

- Education: University of California at Los Angeles; University of Texas Health Science Center at San Antonio
- Known for: Being the Dean of the University of Florida College of Dentistry
- Scientific career
- Fields: Dentistry
- Workplaces: University of Florida

Teresa A. Dolan a former dean of the Dean of the University of Florida College of Dentistry. They are from Jersey City, New Jersey.

Dolan retired from the University of Florida College of Dentistry after serving 10 years as dean and 24 years as faculty at the college. In May 2003 she was promoted from interim dean to the new dean of the college.

Dolan first came to the University of Florida in 1989 to begin her career as an assistant professor. Dolan served as an associate director of a joint medicine and dentistry Geriatric Fellowship Program, and as the associate dean for education. She was appointed interim dean in 2002 and dean in 2003.

== Education ==
- Master's degree in public health from the University of California at Los Angeles.
- Doctorate in Dental Surgery from the University of Texas Health Science Center at San Antonio.

== See also ==
- Women in dentistry in the United States

Preceded by Dr. Frank A. Cattalonotto	Dean of Dentistry; 2002 – 2013	Succeeded by Isabel Garcia
