= Ada Sue Hinshaw =

American nurse (born 1939)

Ada Sue Hinshaw (born May 20, 1939) is an American nurse best known for her research on quality of care, patient outcomes, and positive nurse working environments. Hinshaw was designated as a Living Legend by the American Academy of Nursing in 2011.

== Early life and education ==
Ada Sue Hinshaw was born to Oscar Allen Cox and Georgia Tucker Cox in Arkansas City, Kansas on May 20, 1939. She spent most of her childhood in Cherryvale, Kansas, and graduated from Cherryvale High School in 1957.

After graduating from high school, Hinshaw enrolled in the School of Nursing at the University of Kansas, which was her mother's alma mater. While she was a student at the University of Kansas, Hinshaw also worked part-time on an Ear Nose and Throat ward. She graduated with her B.S. in 1961.

Hinshaw then moved to the School of Nursing at Yale University, where she focused on midwifery and graduated with her Master of Science in Nursing in 1963. She returned to school in 1971 to study sociology. She enrolled at the University of Arizona, obtaining her Master of Arts in sociology in 1973, and her PhD in 1975.

Hinshaw was the first permanent director of the National Institute of Nursing Research, serving from 1987 to 1994.
