= Tara A. Schwetz =

American biophysicist and government official

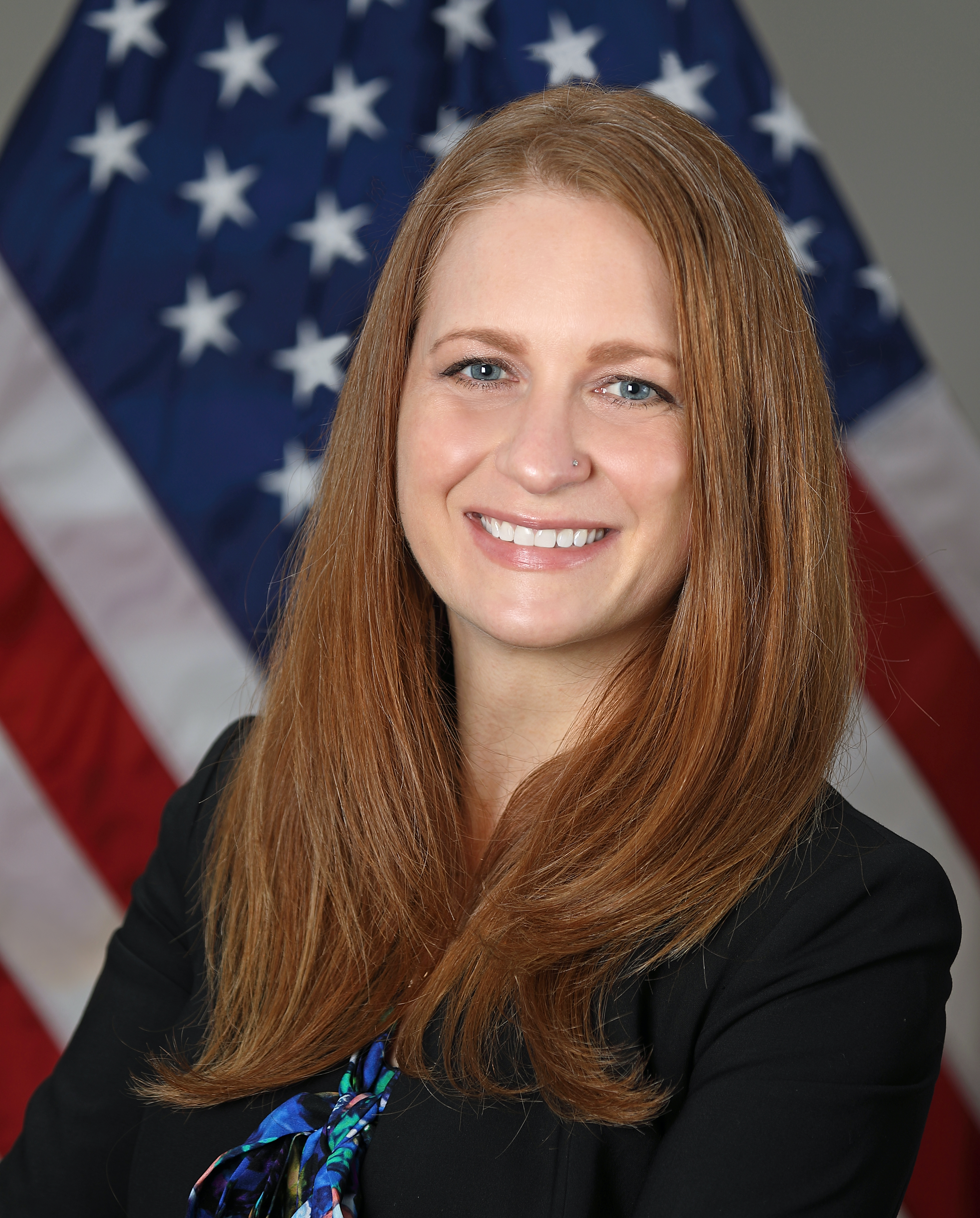

Deputy Director for Program Coordination, Planning, and Strategic Initiatives of the National Institutes of Health
- In office October 2023 – March 2025

Principal Deputy Director of the National Institutes of Health
- Acting
- In office December 2021 – November 2023
- Preceded by: Lawrence A. Tabak
- Succeeded by: Lawrence A. Tabak

Director of the National Institute of Nursing Research
- Acting
- In office January 2020 – September 2020
- Preceded by: Lawrence A. Tabak (acting)
- Succeeded by: Shannon Zenk

Associate Deputy Director of the National Institutes of Health
- In office January 2019 – November 2021
- Preceded by: Courtney F. Aklin (Acting)

Personal details
- Born: May 4, 1983 (age 43) Lakeland, Florida, U.S.
- Spouse: Brian Schwetz
- Education: Florida State University (BS); University of South Florida (PhD)

Tara A. Schwetz (née Munn) is an American biophysicist and government administrator who serves as a deputy director of the National Institutes of Health. She previously served as Acting Principal Deputy Director.

Prior to her appointment as Acting Principal Deputy Director, she served as the Associate Deputy Director, NIH—a role she has held began in January 2019.

She joined the NIH in 2012 as an American Association for the Advancement of Science (AAAS) Science and Technology Policy Fellow and has held a number of positions during her time at the agency. She was placed on administrative leave in March 2025.

== Education ==
A native of Lakeland, Florida, Schwetz is a first-generation college graduate. Schwetz received a Bachelor of Science in Biochemistry with honors from Florida State University in 2005 (Honors Thesis: Non-metal activation of iron-dependent regulator protein in mycobacterium tuberculosis). She then went on to earn a Doctor of Philosophy in Medical Sciences, Biophysics from the University of South Florida in 2009 (Dissertation: Glycosylation Modulates Cardiac Excitability by Altering Voltage-Gated Potassium Currents). Schwetz was a postdoctoral researcher in the lab of David W. Piston at Vanderbilt University from 2009 to 2012.

== Career ==
Throughout her nearly decade-long career at the NIH, Schwetz has held multiple positions, both within the Office of the Director and across several Institutes.

During her tenure as the Associate Deputy Director of NIH, Schwetz served as the Acting Director and Acting Deputy Director of the National Institute of Nursing Research (NINR).

Her former roles include Chief of the Strategic Planning and Evaluation Branch at the National Institute of Allergy and Infectious Diseases, where she led several efforts, including an evaluation of the Centers of Excellence for Influenza Research and Surveillance to facilitate evidence-based decision-making and development of the NIAID Strategic Plan for Tuberculosis Research. Schwetz also served as the Senior Advisor to the Principal Deputy Director of NIH, the NIH Environmental influences on Child Health Outcomes (ECHO) Interim Associate Program Director, and as a Health Science Policy Analyst at the National Institute of Neurological Disorders and Stroke. Schwetz started her career at NIH as an AAAS Science and Technology Policy Fellow at NINR.

Schwetz has led or co-led a number of high-profile, agency-wide efforts, including two Rapid Acceleration of Diagnostics (RADx) programs (RADx Underserved Populations, RADx Radical) to speed innovation in the development, commercialization, and implementation of technologies for COVID-19 testing, and the Implementing a Maternal health and Pregnancy Outcomes Vision for Everyone (IMPROVE) initiative. She also spearheaded several strategic planning efforts, such as the first NIH-Wide Strategic Plan and the NIH-Wide COVID-19 Strategic Plan; and played a significant role in the development of the National Pain Strategy.

=== ARPA-H ===
For much of 2021, Schwetz served on detail to the White House Office of Science and Technology Policy as the Assistant Director for Biomedical Science Initiatives. In this role, she led development and planning efforts to stand up the proposed Advanced Research Projects Agency for Health (ARPA-H). The Biden Administration proposed ARPA-H in the fiscal year 2022 President’s budget request to tackle some of the biggest health challenges faced by all Americans by driving medical innovation more rapidly.

== Awards and honors ==
Schwetz is the recipient of numerous NIH awards, including the NIH Ruth Kirschstein National Research Service Award. In addition, she received awards from the American Cancer Society and American Heart Association. She is also the first female recipient of the USF Genshaft Family Doctoral Fellowship.
