= Rena D'Souza =

Clinician-scientist

Rena D’Souza
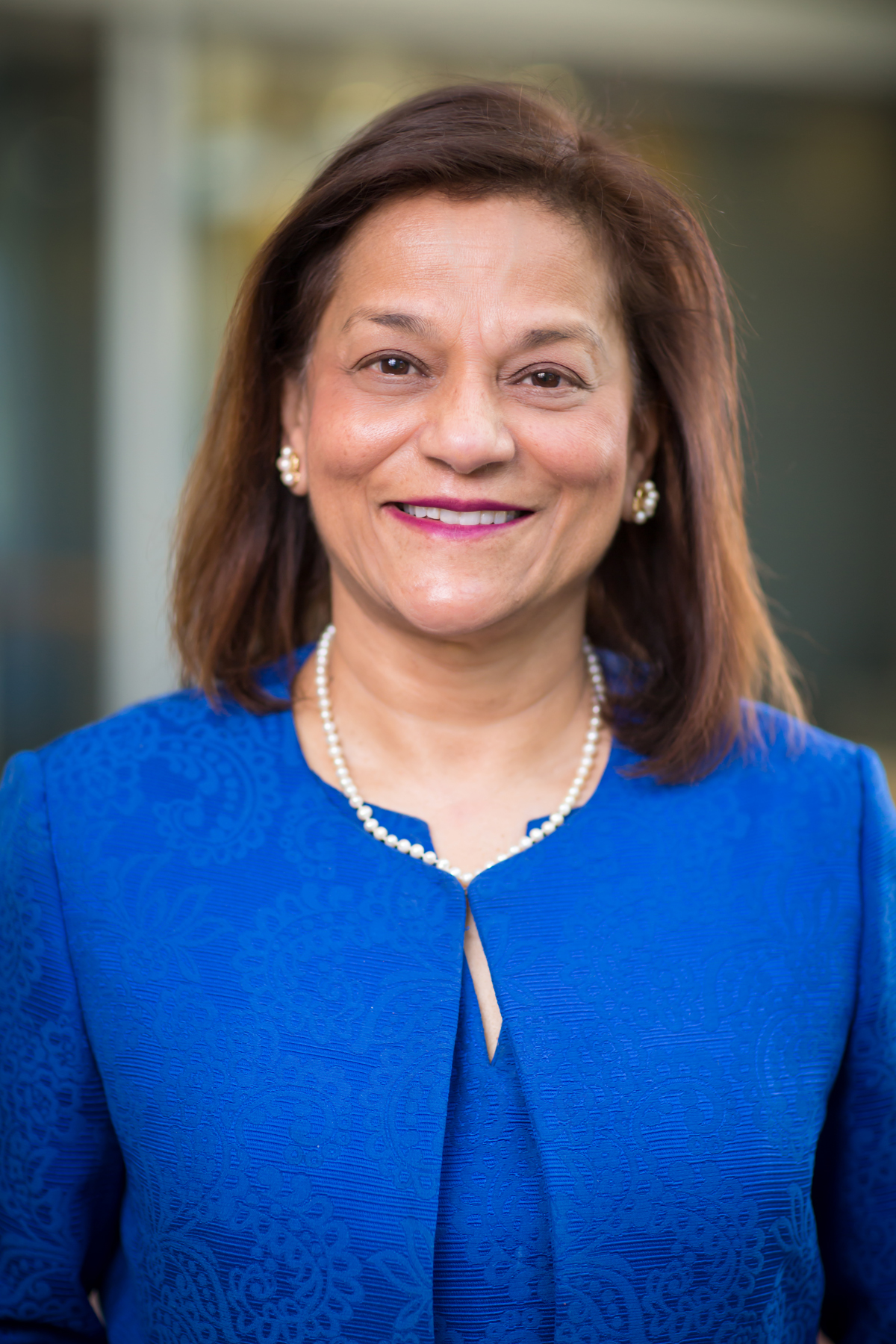
- Born: January 22, 1955 (age 71); Bombay, India
- Education: University of Mumbai (BS); University of Texas, Houston (DDS, MS, PhD)
- Known for: Director of the National Institute of Dental and Craniofacial Research
- Scientific career
- Fields: Developmental Biology, Dentistry, Engineering
- Workplaces: National Institute of Dental and Craniofacial Research, National Institutes of Health, 2020 – 2025; University of Utah, 2013 – 2020; Texas A&M University, 2006 – 2012

Rena N. D'Souza (born January 22, 1955) is a clinician-scientist and former director of the National Institute of Dental and Craniofacial Research. She was formerly the assistant vice president for academic affairs and education for health sciences at the University of Utah where she was also a Professor of Dentistry in the School of Dentistry and a Professor of Neurobiology and Anatomy in the School of Medicine.

== Early life and education ==
D'Souza was born and raised in Mumbai, India. She attended the University of Mumbai (then the University of Bombay), where she received her Bachelor of Dental Science degree in 1977. She then moved to Houston in the United States where she attended the University of Texas Health Science Center at Houston. There, she received her Doctor of Dental Medicine degree in 1985 and her doctorate degree in 1987.

== Career ==
D'Souza's research interests center on tissue engineering and dental care, working with tooth stem cells to develop a method to re-grow the living tissue and eliminate the need for root canals. She has worked with colleagues to attempt to regenerate tooth pulp using a gelatin-like protein hydrogel, which serves as a base into which pulp cells, blood vessels, and nerves can grow. Her research group has also worked to understand the underlying genetic basis for cleft palate working with mice as a model system, linking the condition to a mutation in the PAX9 gene. They found that they could inject pregnant mice carrying babies with cleft palates with a drug that could restore the palatal shelves of their pups. In June 2020, D'Souza became the inaugural Ole and Marty Jensen Endowed Chair, which was established to enable further innovations in tissue engineering for dental and craniofacial research.

=== Leadership ===
From 2012 to 2013, D'Souza served as the American Association for Dental Research's forty-first President and from 2018 to 2019, she served as the International Association for Dental Research's ninety-fifth President. On August 1, 2013, she became the first dean of the University of Utah's new School of Dentistry. In August 2020, D'Souza was selected as the National Institute of Dental and Craniofacial Research's ninth director, replacing Martha Somerman, who served from 2011 to 2020. D'Souza began her tenure on October 13, 2020.

== Awards & honors ==
- Elected Fellow, American Association for the Advancement of Science, 2011
- Elected Fellow, American Association for Dental Research, 2016
- Irwin D. Mandel Distinguished Mentoring Award, International Association for Dental Research, 2017
- In 2012 she became a member of the German Academy of Sciences Leopoldina.
