= Lawrence A. Tabak =

American dentist and scientist (born 1951)

Lawrence Tabak
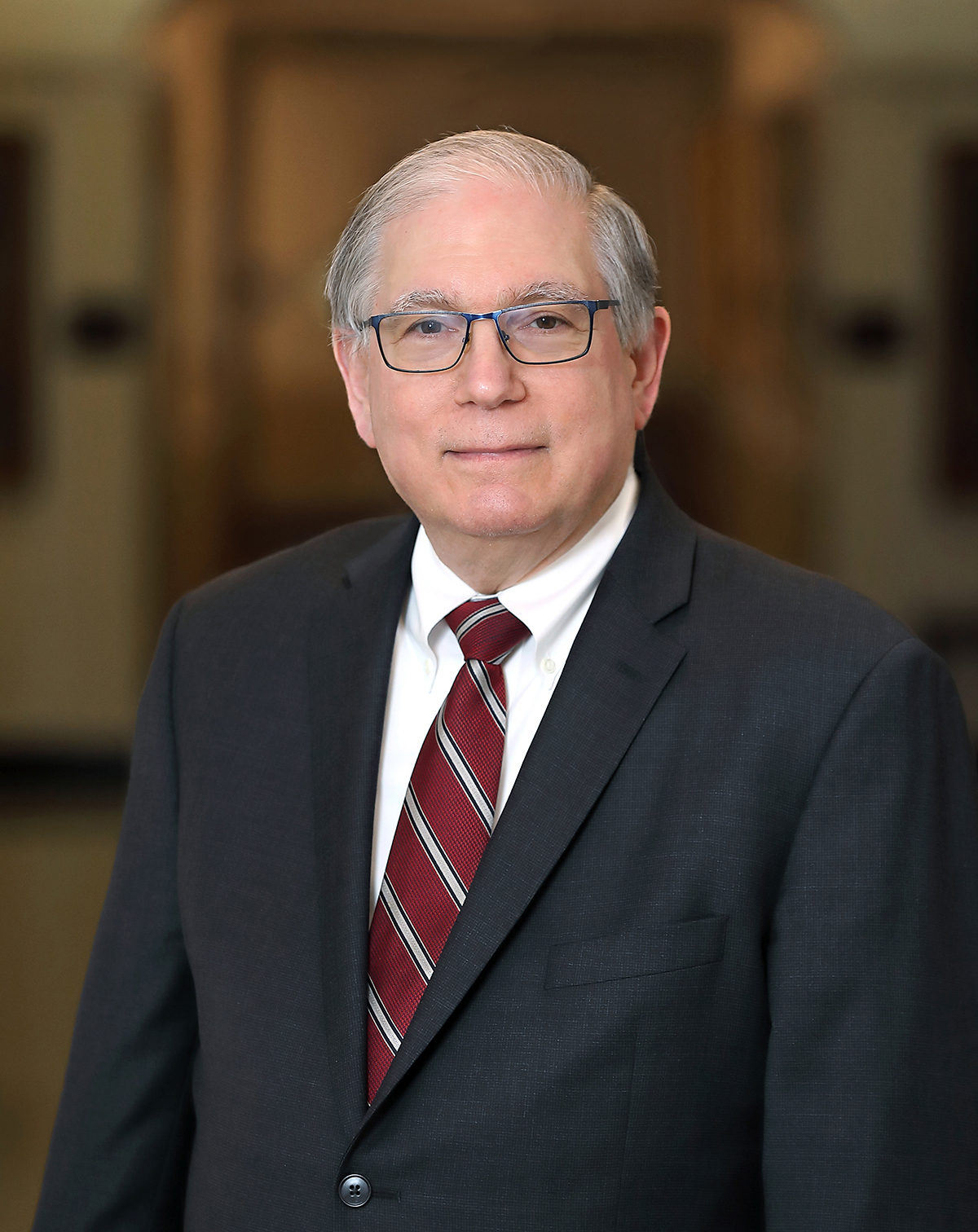
- Tabak in 2021

Director of the National Institutes of Health
- Acting; December 20, 2021 – November 8, 2023
- President: Joe Biden
- Deputy: Tara A. Schwetz (acting)
- Preceded by: Francis Collins
- Succeeded by: Monica Bertagnolli

Principal Deputy Director of the National Institutes of Health
- In office August 2010 – February 12, 2025
- Preceded by: Raynard S. Kington
- Succeeded by: Matthew Memoli

Director of the National Institute of Dental and Craniofacial Research
- In office September 2000 – August 2010
- Preceded by: Harold C. Slavkin
- Succeeded by: A. Isabel Garcia (acting)

Director of the National Institute of Nursing Research
- Acting; October 2019 – December 2019
- Preceded by: Ann K. Cashion (acting)
- Succeeded by: Tara A. Schwetz (acting)

Personal details
- Born: 1951 (age 74–75) New York City, New York, United States
- Education: City College of New York (BS); Columbia University (DDS); University at Buffalo (PhD)
- Scientific career
- Fields: Biochemistry; Dentistry
- Thesis: Structural and functional studies of monkey salivary mucin (1981)

Lawrence A. Tabak (born 1951) is an American dentist and biomedical scientist serving as the principal deputy director of the National Institutes of Health. He served as acting director from 2021 to 2023. Previously he was the director of the National Institute of Dental and Craniofacial Research from 2000 to 2010.

== Education ==
Tabak is a native of Brooklyn, New York. He received his undergraduate degree from City College of New York, his DDS from Columbia University College of Dental Medicine, and both a PhD and a specialty certificate in endodontics from the University at Buffalo. Tabak's 1981 dissertation was titled Structural and functional studies of monkey salivary mucin.

== Career ==
Tabak was the senior associate dean for research and professor of dentistry and biochemistry and biophysics in the University of Rochester Medical Center. He was a National Institutes of Health MERIT Award recipient, Tabak's major research focus has been on the structure, biosynthesis and function of glycoproteins. He continued working in this area, maintaining an active research laboratory within the NIH intramural program, in addition to his administrative duties.

Tabak served as the director of the National Institute of Dental and Craniofacial Research from 2000 to 2010. He served as acting NIH deputy director in 2009 and was the acting director of the Division of Program Coordination, Planning, and Strategic Initiatives. Tabak succeeded Raynard S. Kington as the NIH principal deputy director in August 2010. Tabak serves as the deputy ethics counselor of the NIH. In October 2019, Tabak succeeded Ann K. Cashion as the acting director of the National Institute of Nursing Research. He was succeeded by Schwetz in January 2020.

On December 20, 2021, Tabak succeeded Francis Collins as acting director of the NIH. Tara A. Schwetz will serve in Tabak's previous role as the acting principal deputy director of the NIH.

Tabak retired from the National Institutes of Health on February 11, 2025.

== Controversies ==
Tabak, along with Admiral Rachel Levine, was accused of suppression of the National Toxicology Program (NTP) publication of a Systematic Review and Meta-analysis on fluoride exposure and cognition days before its projected May 2022 publication. The NTP findings were subsequently published in August 2024 and January 2025 after the intercession of Judge Edward M. Chen.

== Awards and honors ==
Tabak is an elected member the National Academy of Medicine. He is a Fellow of the American Association for the Advancement of Science.

Government offices
Preceded by Francis Collins	Director of the National Institutes of Health; Acting; 2021–2023	Succeeded by Monica Bertagnolli
