= Renee Wegrzyn =

American applied biologist (born 1976)

Renee Diane Wegrzyn
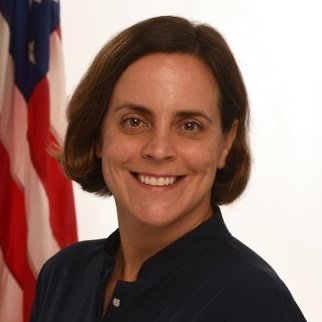

Director of the Advanced Research Projects Agency for Health
- Incumbent
- Assumed office October 20, 2025
- President: Joe Biden; Donald Trump
- Deputy: Susan Monarez
- Preceded by: Position established
- Succeeded by: Alicia Jackson

Personal details
- Born: November 25, 1976 (age 49)
- Education: Georgia Institute of Technology (BS, MS, PhD)

Renee Diane Wegrzyn (born November 25, 1976) is an American applied biologist who has served as the inaugural director of the Advanced Research Projects Agency for Health since October 2022, ending in February 2025.

== Education ==
Wegrzyn earned a Bachelor of Science and PhD in applied biology from Georgia Tech.

== Career ==
From 2003 to 2006, Wegrzyn worked as a post-doctoral research fellow at the Center for Molecular Biology of Heidelberg University. From 2006 to 2008, she worked as the assay development group leader for Adlyfe, a biotechnology company. In 2009, she was a senior scientist at Meso Scale Discovery and in 2012, she was a fellow at the Johns Hopkins Center for Health Security. From 2009 to 2016, she worked as a senior lead technologist at Booz Allen Hamilton. From 2016 to 2020, she served as a program manager in the Biological Technologies Office of DARPA, where she specialized in synthetic biology and biosecurity. Since 2018, she has been a senior advisor to the Nuclear Threat Initiative. In 2020, she joined Ginkgo Bioworks as vice president of business development.

In September 2022, President Joe Biden announced his appointment of Wegrzyn to be the inaugural director of the recently created Advanced Research Projects Agency for Health under the National Institutes of Health within the Department of Health and Human Services. Wegrzyn was sworn in by Secretary Xavier Becerra on October 11, 2022. She was dismissed by the Trump administration in February 2025.
