= National Institute of Dental and Craniofacial Research =

Branch of the U.S. National Institutes of Health

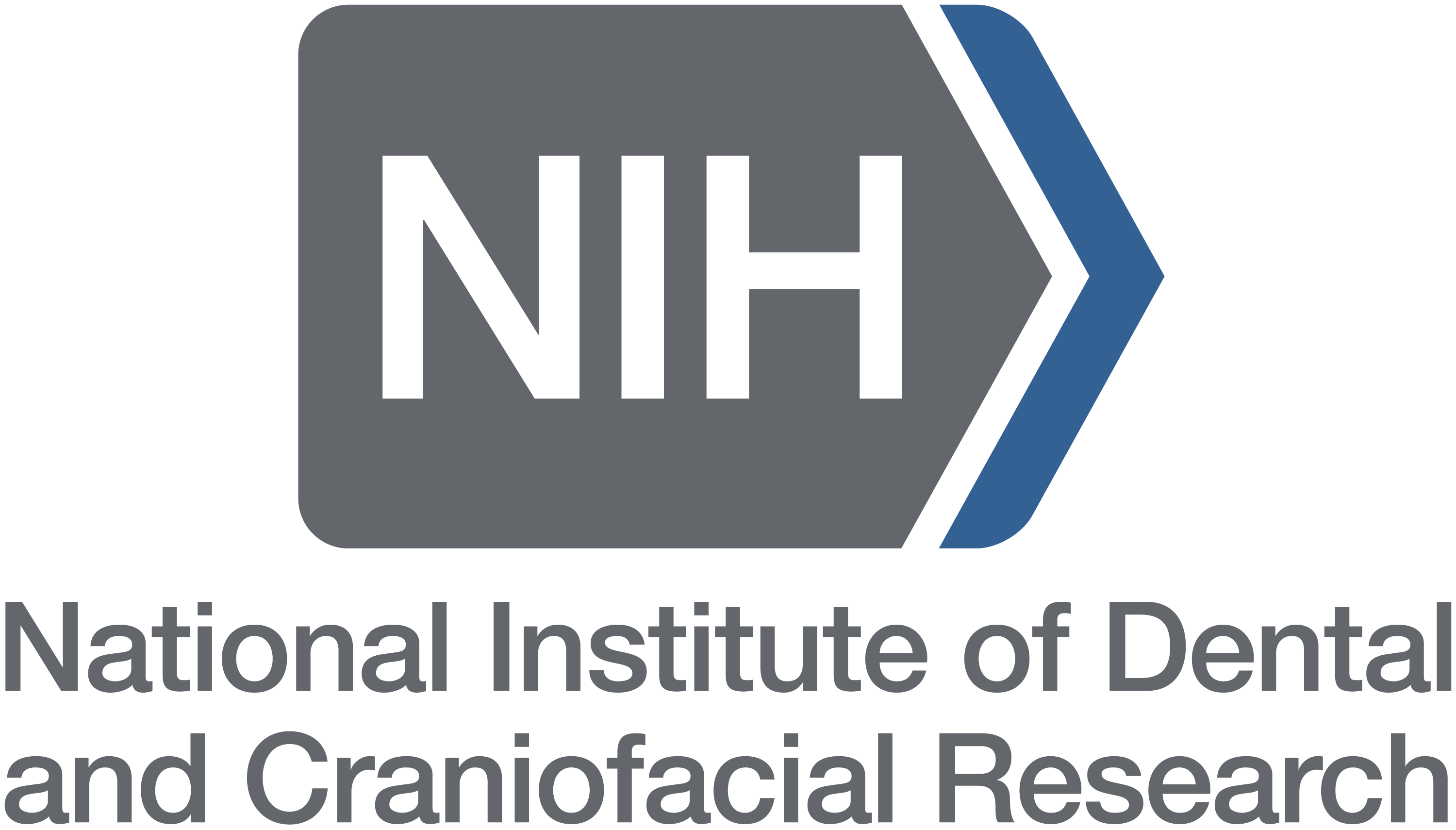

Agency overview
- Formed: September 16, 1948; 77 years ago
- Jurisdiction: United States Government
- Annual budget: USD485 m (2020)
- Agency executive: Jennifer Webster-Cyriaque, Acting Director
- Parent agency: Department of Health and Human Services
- Website: www.nidcr.nih.gov

The National Institute of Dental and Craniofacial Research (NIDCR) is a branch of the U.S. National Institutes of Health. The institute aims to improve the oral, dental, and craniofacial health through research and the distribution of important health information to the American people.

== History ==
In 1931, the United States Public Health Service established a Dental Hygiene Unit at the National Institutes of Health. Designated as the first dental research worker, Dr. H. Trendley Dean studied the communities affected by the oral disease known as mottled enamel. Following the implementation of a water fluoridation trial in Grand Rapids, Michigan, the National Institute of Dental Research (NIDR), was established by President Harry S. Truman on June 24, 1948. The first grants and fellowships that supported dental research were awarded the following year.

In an effort to expand the NIDR, plans to finance the construction of a building for the institute were approved by President Dwight D. Eisenhower in 1958. The National Institute of Dental Research also established the Laboratory of Biochemistry to further the research regarding the structure and functions of various proteins. In continuing with this expansion, a grant to develop several dental research facilities at various universities was approved in 1967. This program hoped to establish research and training environments, as well as promote interdisciplinary approaches to combating oral diseases.

In addition to the Laboratory of Biochemistry, other laboratories were established in the years 1974 and 1975. These newly established laboratories focused on the field of oral medicine as well as the fields of microbiology and immunology. Another effort to expand research was implemented a decade later. The Dentist Scientist Award Program aimed to provide dentists with opportunities and incentive to pursue independent research regarding oral health.

In 1986, the most extensive survey on the dental health of American adults was completed by the NIDR. This study was the first to examine oral health diseases on a large and detailed scale. Following this survey, in 1993, the National Oral Health Information Clearinghouse was established. The purpose of this database is to provide resources for health professionals, patients, and the general public regarding oral health. In continuing with its mission to distribute important health information, the NIDR launched its official website in 1996.

Following its 50th anniversary, the NIDR changed its name to the National Institute of Dental and Craniofacial Research (NIDCR).

In 2001, the NIDCR released its revamped plan to eliminate oral health disparities across the United States. The institute followed up with this plan by establishing five new Centers for Research to Reduce Oral Health Disparities.

A decade later, Martha J. Somerman was appointed as the eighth director of the NIDCR. Through nurturing fundamental research and the development of researchers, the NIDCR aims to promote health, to prevent diseases and conditions, and to develop new diagnostics and therapeutics.

In 2020, Rena D'Souza was selected as the NIDCR's ninth director, replacing Martha Somerman, who had served from 2011 to 2020. D'Souza's tenure as Director began in October 2020 and Jennifer Webster-Cyriaque became the deputy director later that year.

== Directors ==
The following persons served as NIDCR director:

No.	Portrait	Director	Start date	End date	Refs.
1		H. Trendley Dean	September 17, 1948	March 31, 1953	
2		Francis A. Arnold, Jr.	April 1, 1953	February 1966	
3		Seymour J. Kreshover	February 1966	June 30, 1975	
acting		Clair L. Gardner	July 1, 1975	December 31, 1975	
4		David B. Scott	January 1, 1976	December 31, 1981	
acting		John F. Goggins	January 1, 1982	December 31, 1982	
5		Harald Löe	January 1983	June 1, 1994	
acting		Dushanka V. Kleinman	June 1994	June 1995	
6		Harold C. Slavkin	July 1995	July 14, 2000	
7		Lawrence A. Tabak	September 2000	August 19, 2010	
acting		A. Isabel Garcia	August 19, 2010	August 28, 2011	
8		Martha J. Somerman	August 29, 2011	December 31, 2019	
acting		Lawrence A. Tabak	January 1, 2020	October 12, 2020	
9		Rena D'Souza	October 13, 2020	January 31, 2025	
acting		Jennifer Webster-Cyriaque	February 1, 2025	Present	
