= Ann Cashion =

American chef

- Born: October 30, 1954 (age 71); Jackson, Mississippi
- Education: Harvard University
- Culinary career
- Current restaurant: Taqueria Nacional
- Previous restaurant(s): Cashion's Eat Place, Johnny's Half Shell
- Award(s) won: 2004 James Beard Foundation Award, Best Chef: Mid-Atlantic

Ann Cashion is a James Beard Award-winning chef and restaurateur in Washington D.C.

Cashion is a native of Jackson, Mississippi, and she graduated from Harvard University in 1976. She enrolled in graduate school at Stanford University for two years before dropping out to pursue a culinary career, starting in a bakery in Berkeley, California. She apprenticed in Italy and France before coming to Washington, D.C., in 1984. Cashion worked at Restaurant Nora, was head chef at Austin Grill, and was executive chef at Jaleo, where she hired José Andrés.

In 1995, she opened her own restaurant, Cashion's Eat Place, in the Adams Morgan neighborhood of D.C. The restaurant was voted "Best New Restaurant" by the readership of Gourmet and was listed in The Washington Post food columnist Phyllis Richman's 50 favorites. Eat Place had many prominent patrons, including chefs Jean-Louis Palladin and Ferran Adrià, and President Bill Clinton. In 1997, Ann Cashion was honored as the Restaurant Association of Metropolitan Washington's "Chef of the Year," and she was invited to cook at the James Beard House.

With partner John Fulchino, Cashion opened a second restaurant, Johnny's Half Shell, in 1999. The small 35-seat restaurant in the Dupont Circle neighborhood was recognized by Gourmet as one of “America’s best new restaurants.” In 2004, Cashion won the James Beard Foundation Award for Best Chef: Mid-Atlantic.

Cashion and Fulchino sold Cashion's Eat Place in 2007 to two of its longtime employees, after which it continued to operate under the same name until 2016, when it closed.

Johnny's Half Shell relocated to the Capitol Hill neighborhood in 2006; the new space could seat over 400, and it became a popular restaurant for Congressional fundraisers. In 2007, Cashion opened Taqueria Nacional next-door to Half Shell, and Bon Appétit named it one of the five best Mexican restaurants in the United States. Taqueria moved to the Logan Circle neighborhood in 2013, and Johnny's Half Shell moved to Adams Morgan in 2016, taking over the space originally occupied by Cashion's Eat Place. Taqueria opened in Mount Pleasant in 2019, and the Logan Circle location closed in 2020. Johnny's Half Shell closed in 2020, when indoor dining was shut down due to the COVID-19 pandemic.

Cashion was one of the chefs featured in the 1997 book, Women of Taste. When Bon Appétit named Washington, D.C. its 2016 restaurant city of the year, Cashion was identified as one of the city's "incredible chefs."
