= Ora L. Strickland =

Professor of nursing

- Other name: Ora Strickland Davis

Ora Lea Strickland, is former dean and professor in the Nicole Wertheim College of Nursing and Health Sciences at Florida International University. She is a fellow of the American Academy of Nursing who is known for her writings on measurement in the nursing profession.

== Early life and education ==
Strickland grew up in Mount Airy, North Carolina where she was one of ten children in her family. She received a bachelor’s degree in nursing from North Carolina Agricultural and Technical State University, Greensboro in 1970. She took a master’s degree in maternal and child health nursing from Boston University, Massachusetts in 1972. In 1977 she earned a Doctor of Philosophy degree in child development and family relations from the University of North Carolina, Greensboro.

== Career ==
Strickland has been a professor at the University of Maryland at Baltimore, the University of North Carolina at Greensboro, and North Carolina Agricultural and Technical State University, Greensboro. She was the Independence Foundation Endowed Professor of Nursing at Emory University. In 2011 she moved to Florida International University where she was named dean. Strickland's writings include the textbook, Measurement of Nursing Outcomes, which been published as multiple volumes. She also wrote a column for The Baltimore Sun that was called "Nurse's Station". In 1993 Strickland was the inaugural editor-in-chief of the Journal of Nursing Measurement.

Strickland's research has examined the existence of Couvade Syndrome in expectant fathers in the United States, and its relationship with social determinants of health, paternal emotional stated and pregnancy planning. She has also investigated premenstrual syndrome.

Strickland played a leadership role in founding the National Institutes of Health’s National Center for Nursing Research (subsequently named institute for Nursing Research.

== Selected publications ==
- Strickland, Ora L. (1987). "The Occurrence of Symptoms In Expectant Fathers". Nursing Research. 36 (3): 184. ISSN 0029-6562.
- Strickland, Ora; Fishman, Dorothy J. (1994). Nursing Issues in the 1990s. Albany, N.Y: Delmar Thomson Learning. ISBN 978-0-8273-5467-8.
- Manson, JoAnn E.; Hsia, Judith; Johnson, Karen C.; Rossouw, Jacques E.; Assaf, Annlouise R.; Lasser, Norman L.; Trevisan, Maurizio; Black, Henry R.; Heckbert, Susan R.; Detrano, Robert; Strickland, Ora L.; Wong, Nathan D.; Crouse, John R.; Stein, Evan; Cushman, Mary (2003-08-07). "Estrogen plus Progestin and the Risk of Coronary Heart Disease". New England Journal of Medicine. 349 (6): 523–534. doi:10.1056/NEJMoa030808. ISSN 0028-4793.
- Strickland, Ora L.; Moloney, Margaret F.; Dietrich, Alexa S.; Myerburg, Stuart; Cotsonis, George A.; Johnson, Robert V. (2003). "Measurement Issues Related to Data Collection on the World Wide Web". Advances in Nursing Science. 26 (4): 246. ISSN 0161-9268.
- Waltz, Carolyn Feher; Strickland, Ora; Lenz, Elizabeth R. (2016). Measurement in Nursing and Health Research. New York: Springer Publishing Company. ISBN 978-0-8261-7061-3.

== Honors and awards ==
She was named a fellow of the American Academy of Nursing in 1978. She received honorary doctorates from the Ohio Medical College in 1992 and from Grand Valley State University in 1997. In 2016 she was inducted in to the International Nursing Research Hall of Fame.
