= Martha Somerman =

American scientist (born 1947)

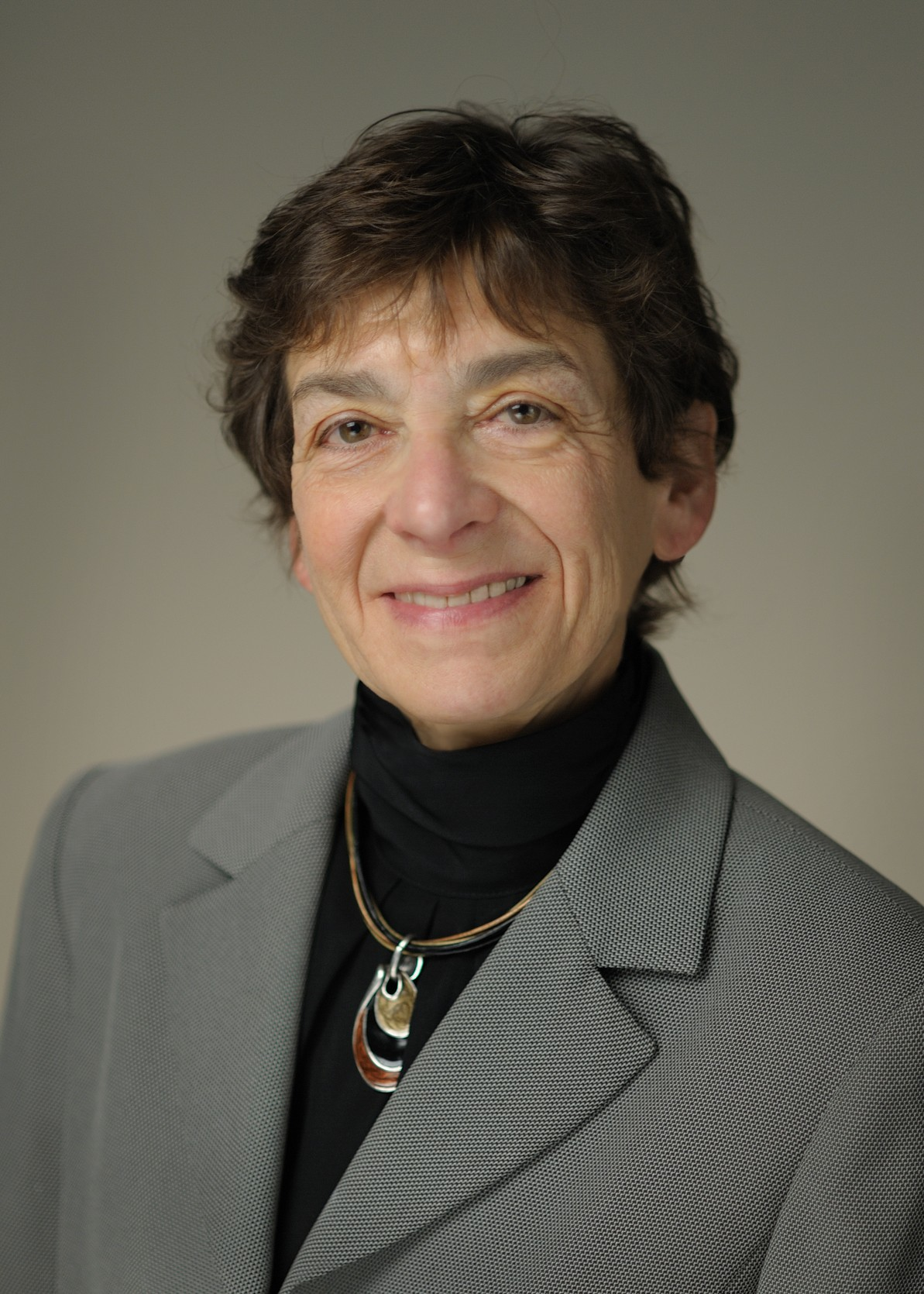
- Official portrait, 2011
- Born: Martha Somerman; March 13, 1947 (age 79); Brooklyn, N.Y., U.S.A.
- Citizenship: United States
- Education: New York University, Hunter College, University of Rochester
- Awards: International Association for Dental Research (IADR) Distinguished Scientist Award 2018
- Scientific career
- Workplaces: National Institute of Dental and Craniofacial Research (NIDCR); University of Washington, University of Michigan, University of Michigan Medical School, University of Maryland

Martha J. Somerman (born March 13, 1947) is an internationally known researcher and educator in medicine, focusing on defining the key regulators controlling development, maintenance, and regeneration of dental, oral, and craniofacial tissues. She was Chief of the Laboratory of Oral Connective Tissue Biology (LOCTB) at the National Institutes of Health's National Institute of Arthritis and Musculoskeletal and Skin Diseases (NIAMS) and Director of the National Institute of Dental and Craniofacial Research (NIDCR), a part of the National Institutes of Health (NIH) located in Bethesda, Maryland. She was the first woman to lead NIDCR. Dr. Somerman retired as the director of NIDCR on December 31, 2019, serving nine years.

== Early life and education ==
Martha J. Somerman was born on March 13, 1947, in Brooklyn, New York. Martha Somerman earned a Bachelor of Arts from New York University, a Master of Science from Hunter College, a Doctor of Dental Surgery from New York University, a Certificate in Periodontology in 1978, and a PhD in Pharmacology from the University of Rochester in 1980.

== Research and career ==
Somerman's career at the University of Michigan started in 1991. She was Associate Professor and Chair for the Department of Periodontics/Prevention/Geriatrics (PPG) at the Michigan Dental School and Associate Professor for the Department of Pharmacology at the Michigan Medical School until 1995. Afterwards she became Professor and Chair of the PPG Department and Professor for the Department of Pharmacology until 2000. She was then Associate Dean of the School of Dentistry at the University of Washington, a position she held for two years and became Dean in 2002 holding that position until 2011. In 2011, she became the first woman to be appointed Director of the National Institute of Dental and Craniofacial Research (NIDCR), succeeding acting director Isabel Garcia. Under this position, Somerman established the Dental, Oral, and Craniofacial Tissue Regenerative Consortium (DOCTR-C) to advance research on innate biological mechanisms and pathways that facilitate regeneration and repair of damaged or diseased tissues. From 2011 until 2021, she was also the Principal Investigator for the Laboratory of Oral Connective Tissue Biology at the National Institute of Arthritis and Musculoskeletal and Skin Diseases (NIAMS). During her time at the NIAMS, she focused on identifying candidate genes and factors to promote periodontal regeneration.

The Somerman played a key role in identifying and characterizing cementoblasts, the cells responsible for forming cementum, a vital mineralized tissue covering tooth roots. Cementoblasts are essential for tooth attachment and regeneration, contributing to periodontal health by facilitating the anchoring of teeth to the surrounding bone.

Somerman has more than 190 peer-review publications with over 8,000 citations and she has contributed to 20 books or book chapters.

== Awards and honors ==
She has received numerous honors and awards throughout her academic career.

- Dr. Somerman was the President of the American Association for Dental Research from 2001 to 2002.
- In 2010 she got the IADR/PRG Award in Regenerative Periodontal Medicine.
- In 2011, Harvard University awarded Martha Somerman the AADR's Paul Goldhaber Award, which is presented annually to "an individual who is held in the highest international esteem in his or her field relating to oral and systemic health", acknowledging her work in the field of the regeneration of hard and soft tissues.
- In 2018, she got awarded from the International Association for Dental Research's (IADR) Distinguished Scientist Award for Basic Research in Biological Mineralization.
- Most recently, in 2021, she became the first woman to receive the American Dental Association's Gold Medal Award for Excellence in Dental Research.

== See also ==
- Women in dentistry in the United States
- Timeline of women in science
