= Patricia A. Grady =

American neuroscientist

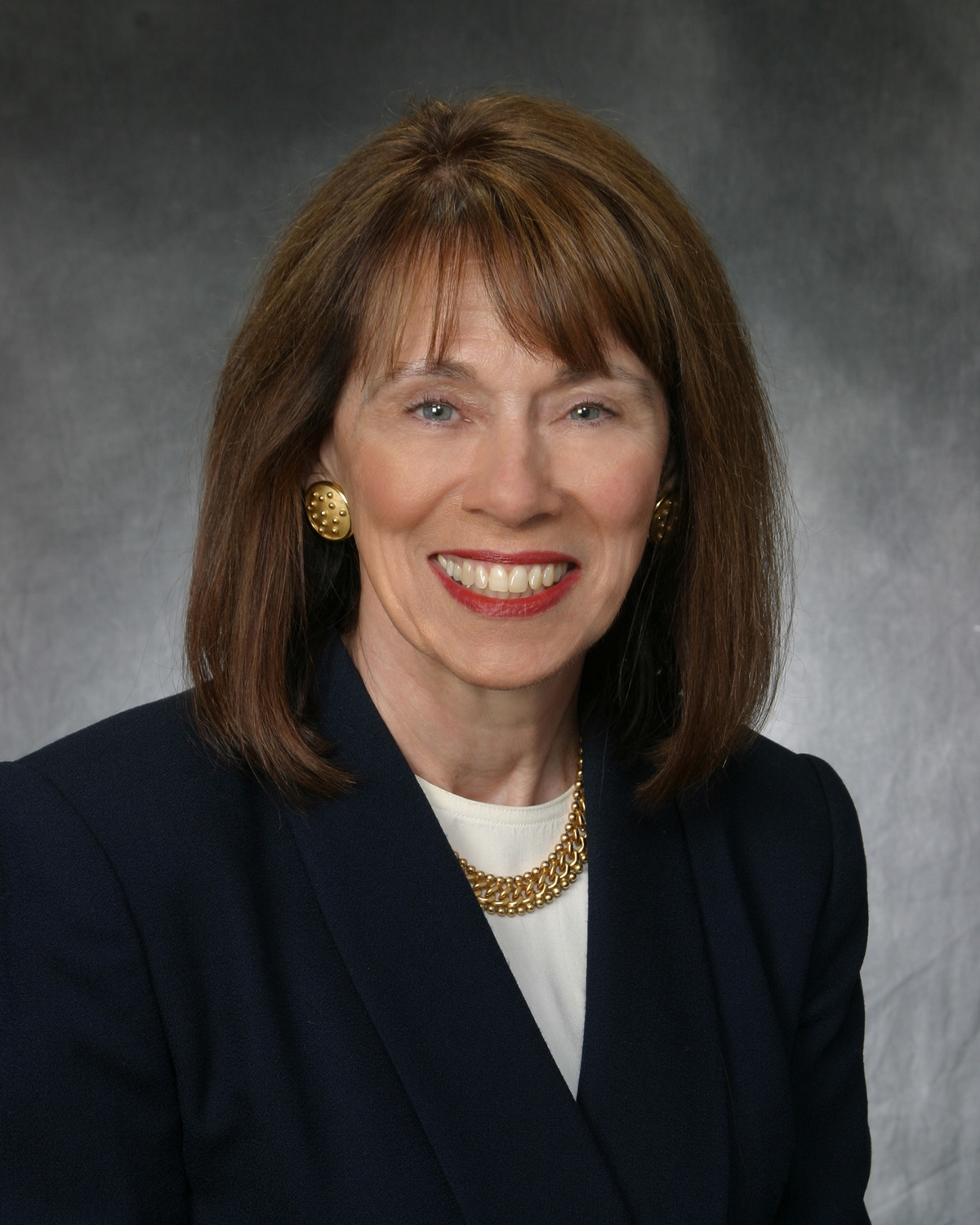
- American neuroscientist and Director of the National Institute of Nursing Research (NINR).
- Education: Georgetown University; University of Maryland
- Known for: Centennial Achievement Medal; Institute of Medicine; Fellow of the American Stroke Association; Fellow of the American Neurological Association
- Scientific career
- Fields: cerebral blood flow; nursing research
- Workplaces: National Institute of Nursing Research; National Institute of Neurological Disorders and Stroke

Patricia A. Grady is an American neuroscientist internationally recognized for her research on stroke, which specializes in cerebral blood flow, metabolism, and function. She is director of the National Institute of Nursing Research (NINR), part of the National Institutes of Health (NIH) in Bethesda, Maryland. Grady was elected to the Institute of Medicine in 1999 and is a member of several scientific organizations, including the Society for Neuroscience and the American Academy of Nursing. She is a fellow of the American Stroke Association and the American Neurological Association.

Grady lectures and speaks nationally and internationally on topics including future directions in nursing research, developments in the neurological sciences, and Federal research opportunities. She is widely known within NIH as a leader supporting the advances of women in science.

Before coming to NIH, Grady held several academic positions and served concurrently on the faculties of the University of Maryland School of Medicine and School of Nursing. Prior to being appointed director of NINR, Grady served as acting director of the National Institute of Neurological Disorders and Stroke (NINDS).

== Early years ==
Grady was raised in South Florida. She excelled in science and was interested in health and decided on a career in nursing "because it gave you flexibility and the potential to carry out the profession in any number of settings and a variety of lifestyles."

Grady earned her undergraduate degree in nursing from Georgetown University. She received her graduate degrees from the University of Maryland: a master's degree from the School of Nursing and a doctorate in physiology from the School of Medicine.

== Stroke research ==
Grady has authored or co-authored numerous articles and papers on hypertension, cerebrovascular permeability, vascular stress, and cerebral edema. She is an editorial board member of the major stroke journals. Her early research projects on stroke and brain function received funding from the NIH and the Office of Naval Research. Grady presented her scientific findings in a number of national and international scientific meetings, including symposia at NIH. In 1988, the National Institute of Neurological Disorders and Stroke (NINDS) recruited her to become an administrator in the area of stroke.

== NINDS ==
In 1988, Grady joined NIH as an extramural research program administrator in the NINDS in the areas of stroke and brain imaging. She served on the NIH Task Force for Medical Rehabilitation Research, which established the first long-range research agenda for the field of medical rehabilitation research. In 1992, she assumed the responsibilities of NINDS Assistant Director. From 1993 to 1995, she was deputy director and acting director of NINDS.

== NINR director ==
Grady was appointed Director of NINR in 1995 by National Institutes of Health Director Harold Varmus.

Under her leadership, the NINR more than doubled its budget and significantly increased the number of research and training grants awarded. NINR's annual budget is about $150 million, and more than 80 percent goes toward funding the work of nurse scientists within NINR and around the country.

Grady was instrumental in shaping "Bringing Science to Life," the institute's long-term strategic plan. Her tenure as Director of NINR was also seen as an increased commitment to training the next generation of nurse scientists, dedicating more resources to training future scientists, as a percentage of budget, than nearly any other NIH institute. She retired from NIH on August 31, 2018.

== Awards and honors ==
In 2002, Grady received the first award of the Centennial Achievement Medal from Georgetown University School of Nursing and Health Studies. In 1996, the University of Maryland presented her with an honorary Doctorate in public service. That same year, she was named the inaugural Rozella M. Schlotfeld distinguished lecturer at the Frances Payne Bolton School of Nursing at Case Western Reserve University. In 2011, Arizona State University's College of Nursing and Health Innovation presented her with a Discover Award.

The Council on Cardiovascular Nurses of the American Heart Association named her the Excellence in Nursing Lecturer in 1995. In 2005, Grady received Doctor of Science, Honoris Causa degrees from the Medical University of South Carolina and Thomas Jefferson University, and Columbia University School of Nursing honored her with its prestigious Second Century Award for Excellence in Health Care. In 2008, Grady received a Doctor of Science, Honoris Causa degree from the State University of New York Downstate Medical Center.

Grady is a past recipient of the NIH MERIT Award and received the Public Health Service Superior Service Award for her exceptional leadership. She has twice been named to Washingtonian magazine's list of "100 Most Powerful Women."
