= Predoctoral fellow =

Academic profession

In academia, a predoctoral fellow is a person combining study for a doctorate with some form of paid research or work, in other words a paid doctoral student. The term is only used in some parts of the world.

== Europe ==
Across EU, typically a doctoral fellow is somebody already registered in a PhD program at a host university to work together with a full professor in a certain topic of research. Upon completion of the research work and other requirements (e.g. graduate courses/exams, see: all but dissertation), the pre-doctoral fellow can submit the thesis to the doctoral committee for review and upon passing the review is asked to defend the thesis in a public presentation for conferral of PhD degree.

== North America (USA/Canada) ==
In the USA a predoctoral fellow (pre-doc) is a researcher who has a master's degree (or equivalent university graduate education), but not a doctorate, but is enrolled in a preparatory program at university for admission to PhD (doctoral degree program) and often granted a stipend. As the name implies, predoctoral fellows often use their time as a fellow to develop their skills and résumé before applying to graduate school for a doctoral degree. They differ from other research employees (research associates) in that they primarily pursue research, rather than maintain the day-to-day function of a research facility, and may have external funding to support their research or educational activities, but typically are also reliant on the support of a research mentor whose lab they work in.

Predocs also refer to predoctoral (that is, before Ph.D.) research positions held at universities and research institutions as a transition, to doctoral studies. In recent times, for instance, the path to a PhD in Economics and Business often contemplates a period of research assistantship for faculty or researchers at universities and research institutions. Such predoc research assistantship programs are available at many universities, business schools, and research institutions.
