= Nursing research =

Research that provides evidence used to support nursing practices

Nursing research is research that provides evidence used to support nursing practices. Nursing, as an evidence-based area of practice, has been developing since the time of Florence Nightingale to the present day, where many nurses now work as researchers based in universities as well as in the health care setting.

Nurse education places focus upon the use of evidence from research in order to rationalise nursing interventions. In England and Wales, courts may determine if a nurse acted reasonably based upon whether their intervention was supported by research.

== Areas of research ==
As an academic discipline, nursing encompasses a wide diversity of epistemological positions and methodological approaches. Some influential nursing scholars, such as Jacqueline Fawcett, have historically advocated for disciplinary integration and unicity. However, this stance has been the subject of sustained debate, particularly regarding both its desirability and the form it should take.

Contemporary nursing research reflects a broad range of epistemological orientations, spanning strong constructivism to post-positivism. In recent years, the field has also been increasingly shaped by the growing influence of Indigenous ways of knowing. Correspondingly, there is substantial diversity in research methods and areas of focus within the discipline.

== Evidence-based quality improvement practices ==
In 2008, the Agency for Healthcare Research and Quality AHRQ created the AHRQ Health Care Innovations Exchange to document and share health care quality improvement programs, including hundreds of profiles featuring nursing innovations. Each of the nursing profiles contained in this collection contains an evidence rating that assesses how strong the relationship is between the innovative practice and the results described in the profile. Evidence-Based Practice (EBP) is both a goal and approach in nursing, however, there are nurse-related barriers to evidence based-practice such as limited knowledge of EBP and work overload.

== See also ==
- AHRQ Health Care Innovations Exchange
- Evidence-based medicine
- Nursing journal
- Nursing theory
