= Nurse scientist =

Occupation

A nurse scientist is a nurse with advanced preparation such as a Ph.D. in nursing or related field including research principles and methodology, who also has expert content knowledge in a specific clinical area. The primary focus of the role is to provide leadership in the development, coordination and management of clinical research studies; provide mentorship for nurses in research; lead evaluation activities that improve outcomes for patients participating in research studies; contribute to the overall health sciences literature. Nurse scientists have been regarded as knowledge brokers. They participate in nursing research.

== See also ==
- Biomedical scientist
