= Midwives Alliance of North America =

Healthcare professional organization

The Midwives Alliance of North America (MANA) was founded in April 1982 to build cooperation among midwives and to promote midwifery as a means of improving health care for North American women and their families. Its stated goal was to unify and strengthen the profession of midwifery, thereby improving the quality of health care for women, babies, and communities. MANA announced that it would permanently dissolve effective March 1, 2024, ending more than forty years of organizational activity.

== History ==
When MANA was founded there were many organizations that midwives had been instrumental in organizing and that provided a means of communication and support. However, none had a membership base broad enough, an internal support system, or the political credibility to promote midwifery as an accepted part of the maternal-child health care system in North America. In October 1981, Sister Angela Murdaugh, of the American College of Nurse-Midwives, invited four non-nurse midwives and four nurse-midwives from around the country to Washington D.C. to discuss issues confronting all midwives, with special emphasis on the communication concerns between American midwives trained as nurses and those who were not formally trained. A decision was made to form a "Guild" that would include all midwives with four purposes in mind: to expand communication among midwives; to set educational and training guidelines; to set guidelines for basic competency and safety for practicing midwives; and to form an identifiable professional organization for all midwives in the U.S. Throughout its history MANA has advocated for the belief that birthing mothers should be able to choose their places and caregivers at birth and that midwifery should be decriminalized.

In April 1982, nearly 100 women from around the country met in Lexington, Kentucky. At this meeting the name Midwives Alliance of North America was chosen, and it was decided that Canadian midwives would be included in the organization. Officers were chosen and a newsletter Practicing Midwife (changed to MANA News in 1983) was established. In October 1983, the first MANA convention was held, and the members elected Teddy Charvet as president, Ina May Gaskin as vice president, and Rena Porteus as second Vice President.

MANA launched the North American Registry of Midwives (NARM) which certifies Certified Professional Midwives. NARM became a separately incorporated entity in 1992 and since has developed a competency-based certification process.

== Goals ==
MANA's organization's goals were:

- To engage midwives in dialogue and to encourage solidarity across North America.
- To recognize the diversity among midwives and to foster inclusive community building.
- To build an identity as a cohesive organization representing the profession as well as the tradition of midwifery at regional, national and international levels.
- To position midwives as acknowledged authorities, working to improve perinatal health in collaboration with other professionals.
- To collect and disseminate high quality research about midwifery care.
- To promote excellence in midwifery practice.
- To sponsor continuing education opportunities for midwives.
- To increase access to midwives in all settings.
- To endorse the Midwives Model of Care as the gold standard for childbirth.
- To affirm the rights of pregnant women to give birth where and with whom they choose.

== Membership ==
MANA membership included midwives and student midwives, other healthcare providers, and families. Over one-third of MANA's member midwives were certified professional midwives (CPMs), the remainder are certified nurse midwives, certified midwives, state-licensed midwives, traditional midwives, and student/apprentice midwives.

In 2012, several midwives of color publicly resigned from MANA, citing concerns about structural racism, lack of inclusion, and inequitable representation within the organization's leadership.

== Research ==
MANA's Division of Research maintained a registry of midwife-assisted births in the US and Canada, that were made available for use in research upon request. Published research has provided descriptive evidence on practice and safety of recorded home births, but contribution to the data set was voluntary and direct comparisons to hospital births remain difficult.

MANA's primary research initiative, the MANA Statistics Project, later continued as “MANA Stats Plus,” which reports maintaining a national community-birth registry of more than 200,000 validated records. Published analyses of earlier MANA Stats data identified higher rates of adverse outcomes in certain elevated-risk categories, including breech presentation, postdates pregnancy, and planned VBAC in home and birth-center settings. After MANA dissolved in 2023, the continuation of the registry, now housed outside any formal academic institution, prompted questions within the midwifery community about long-term governance, data transparency, and the absence of a clearly defined oversight structure. Commentators also noted the historical overlap between MANA and the National Association of Certified Professional Midwives (NACPM), observing that the two organizations’ close administrative alignment during MANA's operation complicates assessment of the independence of the post-MANA registry.

== Dissolution and Legacy ==
MANA formally dissolved in 2023 after more than four decades as a national midwifery organization. Although MANA did not provide a detailed public explanation for its closure, historians and professional commentators have noted that the organization's relevance had declined substantially in its later years.

Scholarly histories describe how certified nurse-midwives (CNMs), who were involved in the organization's founding conversations, withdrew early from leadership as direct-entry and traditional midwives consolidated control of MANA's governance. Varney and Thompson note that this shift occurred soon after the organization's creation and fundamentally altered its identity, leaving MANA aligned primarily with direct-entry midwives rather than the broader midwifery profession. MANA also faced public criticism from several directions, including midwives of color who raised concerns about racial equity within the organization, and traditional birth attendants who objected to what they viewed as MANA's increasing alignment with formal CPM credentialing structures. Overlap of advocacy solely for direct-entry midwives was later assumed by the National Association of Certified Professional Midwives (NACPM), making MANA's continued alignment with a single midwife type increasingly unnecessary.

As a result of these developments, analysts argue that MANA no longer represented a unified or cross-disciplinary midwifery community by the time of its closure. Instead, the organization had become increasingly sidelined in national discussions of midwifery education, certification, and professional standards, roles that had shifted to other entities such as ACNM, NACPM, MEAC, and NARM.

== See also ==
- American College of Nurse-Midwives
- Boston Association for Childbirth Education
- Childbirth
- Childbirth Connection
- Doula
- International Confederation of Midwives
