= Certified Midwife =

A Certified Midwife (CM) is a professional midwifery credential in the United States issued by the American Midwifery Certification Board (AMCB). Certified Midwives are trained to provide full-scope midwifery care, including prenatal, birth, postpartum, newborn, and well-person gynecologic care. CMs complete graduate-level education accredited by the Accreditation Commission for Midwifery Education (ACME), pass the same national certification exam as Certified Nurse Midwives (CNMs), and meet identical professional standards. The primary distinction is that CMs do not hold a nursing license and instead enter midwifery through a health-related or science-based academic background.

== History ==
The Certified Midwife (CM) credential was launched in 1997 by the American College of Nurse-Midwives (ACNM) and the AMCB to create a graduate-level, academically rigorous midwifery pathway for individuals with relevant health or science degrees who are not nurses.

The credential emerged around the same time as the Certified Professional Midwife (CPM), introduced in 1994–1995 by the North American Registry of Midwives (NARM), which provided certification for midwives trained via apprenticeship and competency-based methods.

Both credentials fall under the category of direct-entry midwifery, but their pathways differ significantly. Certified Midwives must complete a graduate-level program accredited by the Accreditation Commission for Midwifery Education (ACME) and pass a national board examination administered by the AMCB.

The development of the CM credential was partly a response to the rise of the CPM, and was seen by some as an effort to offer a more standardized, academically grounded direct-entry midwifery alternative within regulated systems. Proponents of the CM model have emphasized its clinical rigor and institutional legitimacy, contrasting it with non-academic, apprenticeship-based preparation.

== Legal status ==
As of 2025, Certified Midwives are licensed in the following U.S. states and jurisdictions: Arkansas, Colorado, Delaware, Hawaii, Maine, Maryland, Minnesota, New Jersey, New York, Oklahoma, Rhode Island, Virginia, and the District of Columbia.

Numerous other states are actively considering legislation to license Certified Midwives, often using the CM credential as a way to expand the midwifery workforce while maintaining education and practice standards in line with international norms.

ACNM has called for states to license CMs under existing boards of nursing or medicine and supports full practice authority across all jurisdictions.

== Scope of practice ==
In states where they are licensed, Certified Midwives have the same scope of practice as Certified Nurse-Midwives, including prescriptive authority, management of labor and birth, well-person gynecologic care, family planning, and primary care within their scope.

CMs often work in hospitals, clinics, birth centers, and home birth settings, depending on local regulations.

== The development of the CM credential ==
The creation of the Certified Midwife (CM) credential by the ACNM in 1997 marked a pivotal shift in U.S. midwifery. Designed to open the profession to individuals with health or science degrees rather than nursing credentials, the CM pathway paralleled the CNM in education standards and national board certification but removed the requirement of a nursing license. While intended to expand access, the move caused significant friction within academic nursing.

This tension emerged most clearly after the passage of the New York Midwifery Practice Act of 1992, which authorized licensure of non-nurse midwives under the state's Board of Education. In response, SUNY Downstate Medical Center developed a dual-track program, with one pathway for nurses and another for direct-entry students who completed additional coursework to achieve "nursing equivalency."

Dorothea Lang, a past ACNM president and influential figure in New York midwifery policy, was instrumental in advocating for this separation. Her early exposure to non-nurse midwifery in Japan shaped her belief that professional midwives need not also be nurses. Under her leadership, a coalition of CNMs pushed for independent midwifery regulation outside the nursing board's authority.

However, these developments alarmed many in academic nursing. ACNM's decision to remove the word "nurse" from much of its branding—such as renaming the Journal of Nurse-Midwifery to the Journal of Midwifery and Women's Health—fueled fears that midwifery was moving away from nursing entirely. In a 2003 article in Nursing Outlook, advanced practice nursing leaders expressed concern that the inclusion of non-nurses created confusion and undermined cohesion within the broader field of Advanced Practice Nursing (APN). They wrote:

"The movement of the American College of Nurse Midwives to include midwives who are not nurses but who complete a certified midwifery program that is not nurse driven makes for confusion... It is a professional imperative for ACNM leaders to differentiate the competencies expected of APN midwives from those expected of midwives who are not nurses or who lack graduate degrees."

This divide has persisted, with some leaders calling for clearer distinctions in regulatory frameworks for CNMs versus CMs. Others, including Rooks, have framed the development of the CM credential as a professional response to the Certified Professional Midwife (CPM) credential launched in 1994–1995 by the North American Registry of Midwives. By offering a university-based, accredited, and medically recognized pathway for non-nurses, the CM route was seen as an attempt to maintain professional control over direct-entry midwifery without aligning with the apprenticeship-based CPM model.

== Licensing and legislative debate ==
Efforts to license Certified Midwives (CMs) have progressed slowly since the credential's creation in 1997. In some states, existing licensure pathways for direct-entry midwives, such as the Certified Professional Midwife (CPM) have shaped or limited legislative efforts to introduce the CM credential. In contrast, in states where CMs are already licensed, such as New York, the existence of the CM pathway has been cited in opposition to CPM licensure.

For example, in a 2025 New York State Senate hearing, one witness testified:

"Thirty years ago NY put its faith in the American College of Nurse-Midwives (ACNM) to create a non-nurse direct-entry pathway to the midwifery profession; however, this has been a failed effort, with a paltry 150 candidates credentialed nationally in three decades, while in the same time period over 4700 CPMs have been educated and credentialled nationally. Passage of a single CPM licensing bill would dramatically increase New York's maternity care workforce. It is time for NY to realize that they put their eggs in the wrong basket."

During the COVID-19 pandemic, New York temporarily authorized out-of-state CPMs to practice under an executive order, but permanent legislation stalled, with CM licensure cited as a sufficient alternative.

CPM advocates maintain that while CMs are hospital-trained, CPMs offer unique community-based care crucial for underserved populations, and argue that the CM pathway has been used to justify excluding CPMs from state licensure and reimbursement frameworks.

== Uptake ==
Although Certified Midwives (CMs) were created to offer a formally educated, direct-entry midwifery pathway comparable to Certified Nurse-Midwives (CNMs), uptake has remained limited. Since the credential's inception in 1997, fewer than 500 individuals have ever been certified as CMs, and as of 2025, fewer than 150 are actively practicing across the United States. Despite meeting accredited graduate-level educational standards and being qualified for hospital-based care, CMs have not become the dominant direct-entry midwifery pathway. In contrast, Certified Professional Midwives (CPMs), a credential based on apprenticeship and competency evaluation, has become more widely adopted to fill the role of direct-entry midwives in many communities.

== Workforce data and diversity ==
A 2023 national workforce analysis of AMCB-certified midwives found that there were 12,997 certificants between 2016 and 2020, with Certified Midwives comprising fewer than 2% of this group. The workforce was predominantly white, female, and employed in hospital settings, with limited racial diversity and geographic distribution. Researchers have cited CM expansion as a promising strategy to increase the availability of midwifery care.

=== Tracking challenges and national data ===
A 2023 study published in BMC Pregnancy and Childbirth found that only about 60% of AMCB-certified midwives were accurately captured in the National Provider Identifier (NPI) registry due to coding inconsistencies. The authors developed a recoding method using credential text to more accurately identify CNMs and CMs in national datasets, improving workforce tracking for policy and planning purposes.

== Comparison between credentials ==
Credential	Education Requirements	Licensing Exam	Certifying Exam	Licensure Status
Certified Nurse-Midwife (CNM)	Bachelor's degree in nursing (BSN) + ACME-accredited graduate midwifery program	NCLEX-RN	American Midwifery Certification Board (AMCB)	Licensed in all 50 states and U.S. territories
Certified Midwife (CM)	Bachelor's degree (health-related or equivalent) + ACME-accredited graduate midwifery program	none	American Midwifery Certification Board (AMCB)	Licensed in 13 jurisdictions
Certified Professional Midwife (CPM)	High school diploma or equivalent + MEAC-accredited program or NARM Portfolio Evaluation Process (PEP)	None	North American Registry of Midwives (NARM)	Licensed in 36 states (with varying limitations)

== See also ==
- Certified Nurse Midwife
- Certified Professional Midwife
- Midwifery in the United States
- American College of Nurse-Midwives
- International Confederation of Midwives
