= Jessica Brumley =

American nurse midwife

- Education: University of South Florida; New York University
- Scientific career
- Fields: Obstetrics and gynecology, midwifery
- Workplaces: University of South Florida
- Doctoral advisor: Maureen Groer

Jessica Brumley is an American nurse midwife who is an associate professor of obstetrics and gynecology and director of the division of midwifery at the University of South Florida College of Medicine.

== Life ==
Brumley earned a B.S.N. (1998) and a Ph.D. (2012) in nursing from the University of South Florida College of Nursing. She completed a M.A. (2001) in midwifery at the New York University Rory Meyers College of Nursing. Her dissertation was titled, Testing a Model of Bacterial Vaginosis among Black Women. Maureen Groer was her doctoral advisor.

Brumley is a certified nurse-midwife. In 2017, Brumley became an assistant professor of obstetrics and gynecology and director of the division of midwifery at the University of South Florida College of Medicine. In 2018, she was inducted as a fellow of the American College of Nurse-Midwives (ACNM). She was promoted to associate professor in 2024. She is serving as the ACNM president from 2024 to 2025.
