= Elizabeth Sharp =

American nurse

Elizabeth Sager Sharp CNM, DrPH, FAAN, FACNM, (December 16, 1933 - February 7, 2016) was an American nurse and midwife who specialized in maternal and newborn health. In 1999, she received the American College of Nurse-Midwives' Hattie Hemschemeyer Award.

Sharp started to work as a midwife at Holland City Hospital in Holland, Michigan. She continued her nurse training at Yale University, graduating in 1959. She was taught by Ernestine Wiedenbach. She also worked with Ruth Lubic. Sharp received a doctorate in public health from Johns Hopkins University.

Sharp set up the Yale Young Mothers program to support teenage mothers. She believed that midwifery services must include family planning.

In 1970 Sharp moved to Georgia. She was one of the founders of the midwife service at Grady Memorial Hospital (the Emory University Nurse-Midwifery Service). In the 1970s Sharp set up a graduate midwifery training program, the Emory University Nurse-Midwifery Program, at Nell Hodgson Woodruff School of Nursing at Emory University. She was also one of the founders of the Graduate School of Public Health at Emory.

Sharp was president of the American College of Nurse-Midwives between 1973 and 1975. She is said to have "the credit for [setting up] midwifery in Georgia”.

After her death at the age of 82, a scholarship was set up in her name at Emory University. Her role in the history of midwifery and nursing has been studied.

== Publications ==
- "Relationships between Professions: From the Viewpoint of the Physician and Nurse‐Midwife in a Tertiary Center" (1981), with W. Newton Long, in Bulletin of the Department of Gynecology and Obstetrics Vol. III, No. 3. pp. 184–200, and then in Journal of Nurse-Midwifery, 1982
- "Nurse-midwifery education: its successes, failures, and future" (1983), in Journal of Nurse-Midwifery, 28(2):17-23
