= Certified Professional Midwife =

Midwifery qualification in the USA

Certified Professional Midwife (CPM) is a credential issued by the North American Registry of Midwives (NARM) for direct-entry midwives in the United States who specialize in out-of-hospital maternity care including home birth. Established in 1994, the CPM credential was developed to formalize and regulate the practice of lay midwifery, which had previously operated without standardized national oversight. The legal recognition, educational requirements, and permitted scope of practice for CPMs vary widely across U.S. states.

Certified Professional Midwives (CPMs) are a type of direct-entry midwife, meaning they are not required to hold a nursing degree prior to entering midwifery training. This distinguishes them from Certified Nurse Midwives (CNMs), who must be registered nurses and complete a graduate-level program at a regionally accredited university. In contrast, CPMs may qualify through multiple non-nursing pathways, including apprenticeship-based training or completion of programs accredited by the Midwifery Education Accreditation Council (MEAC). MEAC programs typically confer certificates or associate degrees and are not required to be affiliated with regionally accredited academic institutions.

Among licensed maternity care providers in the United States, CPMs are unique in being eligible for independent clinical practice without holding a regionally accredited academic degree.

== Certification and education ==
CPMs earn their credential by completing one of two primary pathways:

- Graduation from a MEAC-accredited midwifery program (most commonly a certificate) which represents only 36.9% of CPMs

or

- Through the Portfolio Evaluation Process (PEP), a non-didactic apprenticeship-based route.

All CPMs are required to take the North American Registry of Midwives (NARM) certification exam. The exam consists of 350 multiple-choice questions and is administered in a computer-based format at approved testing centers.

The exam is developed and overseen by NARM, the same organization that grants the CPM credential. While NARM publishes summary statistics on exam performance, such as pass rates and reliability coefficients, comprehensive data on the exam's psychometric design and validation process are not independently reviewed or widely available. Professional organizations have raised concerns about the rigor of the CPM credentialing process, noting that the examination is developed and administered by the same organization, NARM, that confers the credential, which may limit independent oversight.

While MEAC programs offer a structured curriculum, the PEP route allows for individualized training under preceptors in individual communities. PEP educational experiences can vary significantly in rigor, setting, and patient exposure since it is dependent on the preceptor and their knowledge and clinical skill base.

== Midwifery Education Accreditation Council (MEAC) ==
MEAC is a programmatic accrediting agency for CPM midwifery education in the United States. MEAC is not recognized by the United States Department of Education or the Council for Higher Education Accreditation (CHEA) and is not a regionally accrediting agency. Colleges and universities in the U.S. utilize regional accreditation with oversight from one of six accrediting agencies that assess overall institutional quality. MEAC, by contrast, accredits only CPM-specific programs, many of which offer certificates only and are not affiliated with institutionally accredited institutions. As a result, MEAC-accredited coursework may not be transferable to traditional academic institutions, and students may have limited access to federal financial aid. These issues are barriers to receiving a MEAC accredited education for some CPMs and have been critiqued as limiting future educational opportunities for CPMs who may want to switch careers. Further, it has led to criticism of the quality and rigor of their educational programs.

=== Loss of U.S. Department of Education recognition ===
MEAC received initial recognition by the U.S. Department of Education (USDE) as a specialized accrediting agency for direct-entry midwifery education in 2001 and lost USDE recognition in 2026.

In March 2025, the U.S. Department of Education initiated an inquiry into MEAC's continued recognition under 34 C.F.R. § 602.33 after receiving information concerning the agency's compliance with the federal Criteria for Recognition. In September 2025, the Department announced that the inquiry had identified noncompliance with 34 C.F.R. § 602.15(a)(1).

In 2026, U.S. Department of Education staff recommended denying continued federal recognition to the Midwifery Education Accreditation Council (MEAC). The Department's final staff report identified multiple areas in which MEAC did not meet federal recognition criteria. The report cited staffing vacancies and turnover, delayed accreditation activities and site visits, untimely federal tax and state filings, delayed financial reviews and audits, incomplete historical records, and deficiencies in the conduct and documentation of site visits.

On July 2, 2026, NARM and the National Association of Certified Professional Midwives (NACPM) informed accredited programs that MEAC had elected not to seek renewed recognition from the U.S. Department of Education and advised that the decision could affect licensure pathways in jurisdictions whose laws reference accreditation by a U.S. Department of Education recognized accrediting agency.

== North American Registry of Midwives (NARM) ==
The North American Registry of Midwives (NARM) is a U.S. nonprofit organization that develops and administers the certification process for the CPM credential. Founded in the early 1990s, by Midwives Alliance of North America, NARM establishes eligibility requirements, oversees the national certification examination, maintains a registry, and manages recertification processes for CPMs.

NARM has been the subject of scrutiny regarding the independence and scope of its oversight functions. Investigative reporting has noted that NARM operates as a self-regulating body and that individuals disciplined by state authorities have, in some cases, retained NARM certification and that NARM “continued to certify midwives who were practicing illegally”, or in states where it was illegal for them to practice.

In 2024, NARM reported identifying potential fiduciary misconduct by a board member, which led to the resignation of the remaining board and prompted an internal review.

Questions have been raised about the nature of NARM’s accreditation. NARM’s certification examination is accredited by the National Commission for Certifying Agencies (NCCA), but NCCA accreditation applies only to the NARM administered exam and not to the CPM credential itself. Despite not having the accreditation to do so, the NARM organization operates as though its accreditation is inclusive of clinical training pathways, preceptor authorization, and disciplinary authority. In published appeals, midwives reported being informed by NCCA that NARM is not accredited to authorize clinical preceptors, despite NARM’s role in registering and sanctioning preceptors for CPM training. Analysts have noted that this separation between exam accreditation and full credential oversight differs from international midwifery standards, which require accredited education programs, regulated clinical supervision, and independent governance.

NARM recently introduced a membership structure, a change that critics argue complicates organizational neutrality by aligning the certifying body with the practitioners it certifies. Taken together, these features reflect a model in which examination validity is externally accredited, while certification standards, clinical training approval, preceptor authorization, and disciplinary governance are controlled by the same private organization that certifies and collects dues and membership fees from CPMs. The combination of regulatory authority and member representation within a single entity raises conflict-of-interest concerns that differ from the governance structures typical of most U.S. health professions.

== Scope of practice and licensure ==
The legal recognition and scope of practice of CPMs vary by state. Some states license CPMs to provide prenatal, intrapartum, postpartum, and newborn care independently, while others impose restrictions or prohibit their practice altogether. In certain jurisdictions, CPMs may have the ability to administer medications such as oxytocin and anti-hemorrhagic agents, while in others, they are legally barred from doing so.

State requirements for CPM licensure vary widely. Some states require completion of a MEAC-accredited midwifery program, while others allow licensure through alternate routes such as apprenticeship or the PEP process without specifying formal education standards. This variation reflects differing state-level approaches to credentialing and has prompted discussion about consistency in training and oversight across jurisdictions.

As of 2026, 32 U.S. states and the District of Columbia, license Certified Professional Midwives (CPMs) for legal practice. In addition, 5 states (Colorado, Missouri, New Hampshire, Rhode Island, and Tennessee) allow CPM practice through certification, registration, or statutory exemption, but do not formally issue a "license." These alternate pathways function similarly to licensure but use different legal terminology or regulatory mechanisms.

State	CPM Legal Status	Notes
Alabama	✓ Licensed	
Alaska	✓ Licensed	
Arizona	✓ Licensed	
Arkansas	✓ Licensed	
California	✓ Licensed	
Colorado	◑ Unlicensed -Registered	Registration required, functions similar to licensure; per Colo. Rev. Stat. § 12‑225‑104
Connecticut	✗ Unlicensed	No licensure or certification for CPMs
Delaware	✓ Licensed	
Florida	✓ Licensed	
Georgia	✗ Unlicensed	
Hawaii	✓ Licensed	
Idaho	✓ Licensed	
Illinois	✓ Licensed	
Indiana	✓ Licensed	
Iowa	✓ Licensed	
Kansas	✗ Unlicensed	
Kentucky	✓ Licensed	
Louisiana	✓ Licensed	
Maine	✓ Licensed	
Maryland	✓ Licensed	
Massachusetts	✗ Unlicensed	
Michigan	✓ Licensed	
Minnesota	✓ Licensed	
Mississippi	✗ Unlicensed	
Missouri	◑ Unlicensed - Exempt	Allowed via statutory exemption, no licensure
Montana	✓ Licensed	
Nebraska	✗ Unlicensed	Only those with a state-recognized credential may legally provide maternity care.
Nevada	✗ Unlicensed	
New Hampshire	◑ Unlicensed - Certified	State calls it “certification” under RSA 326‑D, but functions like licensure
New Jersey	✓ Licensed	
New Mexico	✓ Licensed	
New York	✗ Unlicensed	CNMs/CMs only. CPMs are prosecuted.
North Carolina	✗ Unlicensed	Statute title protects CNM
North Dakota	✗ Unlicensed	
Ohio	✗ Unlicensed	
Oklahoma	✓ Licensed	
Oregon	✓ Licensed	
Pennsylvania	✗ Unlicensed	
Rhode Island	◑ Unlicensed - Certified	Certification required (not labeled licensure)
South Carolina	✓ Licensed	
South Dakota	✓ Licensed	
Tennessee	◑ Unlicensed - Certified	Certification required (not labeled licensure)
Texas	✓ Licensed	
Utah	✓ Licensed	
Vermont	✓ Licensed	
Virginia	✓ Licensed	
Washington	✓ Licensed	
West Virginia	✗ Unlicensed	
Wisconsin	✓ Licensed	
Wyoming	✓ Licensed	

== State-level counts of Certified Professional Midwives (CPMs) and Licensed Midwives (LMs) ==
State-level data show that certification and licensure of midwives are not uniformly aligned across the United States. Certified Professional Midwives (CPMs) are reported in states that do not provide a licensure pathway, for example, Pennsylvania has 60 CPMs although the state does not regulate CPM practice. While in other states licensed midwives may include individuals without CPM certification. Professional sources describe CPM practice across a range of regulatory environments, including states without licensure frameworks, alongside efforts to expand licensure nationwide.

State-level counts of Certified Professional Midwives (CPMs) and Licensed Midwives (LMs), as reported by the National Association of Certified Professional Midwives
State	CPMs	Licensed Midwives	Source
Alabama	24	23	
Alaska	40	32	
Arizona	82	82	
Arkansas	35	28	
California	328	574	
Colorado	81	21	
Connecticut	6	No CPM licensure	
Delaware	3	9	
Florida	96	244	
Georgia	27	No CPM licensure	
Hawaii	26	26	
Idaho	73	80	
Illinois	27	27	
Indiana	23	17	
Iowa	16	16	
Kansas	30	No CPM licensure	
Kentucky	20	20	
Louisiana	16	19	
Maine	40	37	
Maryland	22	34	
Massachusetts	48	No CPM licensure	
Michigan	79	80	
Minnesota	59	59	
Mississippi	7	No CPM licensure	
Missouri	61	No CPM licensure	
Montana	19	39	
Nebraska	2	No CPM licensure	
Nevada	19	No CPM licensure	
New Hampshire	13	1	
New Jersey	9	17	
New Mexico	42	102	
New York	25	No CPM licensure	
North Carolina	47	No CPM licensure	
North Dakota	2	No CPM licensure	
Ohio	52	No CPM licensure	
Oklahoma	29	40	
Oregon	139	104	
Pennsylvania	60	No CPM licensure	
Rhode Island	1	7	
South Carolina	34	51	
South Dakota	3	8	
Tennessee	71	85	
Texas	263	263	
Utah	77	71	
Vermont	26	26	
Virginia	84	117	
Washington	153	153	
West Virginia	6	No CPM licensure	
Wisconsin	89	49	
Wyoming	5	14	

== Attendance at home births ==
Certified Professional Midwives are most known for their attendance at home births. Tracking the number of home births attended by CPMs is difficult due to limitations in national birth certificate data, which do not consistently differentiate CPMs from other non-nurse midwives. One national cohort study found that approximately 29.4% of planned home births in the United States were attended by AMCB-certified midwives (Certified Nurse-Midwives [CNMs] or Certified Midwives [CMs]), while about 50.7% were attended by other midwives. This "other midwives" category is likely predominately CPMs but may also encompass lay midwives and unlicensed birth attendants, particularly in states where CPMs are not legally recognized. In such jurisdictions, births may be attended outside any formal licensure system, complicating efforts to quantify CPM involvement or compare outcomes across provider types.

=== Home birth neonatal mortality by attendant ===
A longitudinal study using CDC linked birth–infant death data from 2010–2017 evaluated neonatal mortality among full-term, normal-weight, singleton births across different birth settings and attendants. Hospital births attended by Certified Nurse-Midwives (CNMs) had a neonatal mortality rate of 3.27 per 10,000 live births. In comparison, planned home births attended by non nurse-midwives had a rate of 12.44 per 10,000, corresponding to an odds ratio (OR) of 3.81 (95% CI: 3.12–4.65), indicating nearly a fourfold increase in risk in mortality for non nurse-midwife attended births. The rate for home births attended by CNMs was 9.48 per 10,000 (OR 2.90; 95% CI 2.17–3.89). Additionally, a comprehensive meta-analysis in 2010 by Wax et al. identified a threefold increase in neonatal mortality associated with planned home birth attended by non-nurse midwives compared to hospital births.

The largest outcomes study of CPM-attended home births in the United States analyzed data from 16,924 planned home births between 2004 and 2009, submitted voluntarily primarily by CPMs to the Midwives Alliance of North America (MANA) Stats Project. The overall neonatal death rate in this dataset (excluding lethal anomalies) was reported as 0.41 per 1,000 births. However, the study identified significantly elevated risks for specific high-risk conditions commonly managed in out-of-hospital settings by CPMs: For breech presentations, the neonatal mortality rate was 10.7 per 1,000, more than 25 times higher than for vertex (head-down) births in the same dataset. For vaginal birth after cesarean (VBAC), the neonatal death rate was 2.85 per 1,000, compared to 0.4 per 1,000 for nulliparous women. For twin births, the neonatal mortality rate was 13.4 per 1,000, compared to 1.3 per 1,000 across the full sample. These findings, drawn from the largest CPM-focused outcomes dataset published to date, have contributed to ongoing discussions regarding the appropriateness of management of high-risk pregnancies in out-of-hospital settings by midwives. A 2015 study published in AJOG found that non-AMCB-certified midwives (primarily CPMs) were significantly more likely to attend higher-risk planned home births—including breech, VBAC, twins, and postdates—compared to AMCB-certified nurse-midwives.

== Education standards and international recognition ==
The CPM credential has been the subject of ongoing debate regarding educational standards, clinical oversight, and alignment with international norms.

The CPM credential does not meet the International Confederation of Midwives (ICM) global educational standards for midwifery practice. ICM defines a midwife as someone who has completed a formal midwifery education program that is recognized in the country where it is located, is at least three years in duration, and results in a recognized academic qualification. Most CPM educational pathways do not meet these criteria in terms of length, academic level, or institutional affiliation. However, the National Association of Certified Professional Midwives (NACPM) does hold affiliate membership in ICM, allowing participation in some ICM activities. This affiliation does not constitute endorsement of the CPM credential itself.

In 2015, several midwifery organizations in the United States—including representatives from the CPM community formed the U.S. Midwifery Education, Regulation, and Association (US MERA) workgroup to explore alignment with the International Confederation of Midwives (ICM) global standards. US MERA initially endorsed a plan to require all new CPMs to graduate from a midwifery education program accredited by the Midwifery Education Accreditation Council (MEAC) by the year 2020, with the intent of meeting ICM's minimum criteria for formal education. However, the plan was never implemented, and the Portfolio Evaluation Process (PEP) an apprenticeship-based route remains a recognized path to certification. The reversal drew criticism from stakeholders who viewed it as a retreat from professionalization and international accountability.

== Organization positions on CPMs ==
=== American Academy of Pediatrics (AAP) ===
The American Academy of Pediatrics (AAP) does not endorse planned home birth, citing increased neonatal risks. While acknowledging the right of patients to choose their birth setting, the AAP recommends that home births only occur under specific conditions: they must be planned, involve a singleton pregnancy at term with no risk factors, and be attended by two qualified professionals—one of whom is solely responsible for neonatal resuscitation. AAP emphasizes that midwives attending home births should be certified by nationally recognized bodies and trained in accordance with international standards, though it does not explicitly endorse or reject the CPM credential. In a 2020 statement issued during the COVID-19 pandemic, the AAP reaffirmed that hospitals remain the safest setting for birth and reiterated the need for all newborns—including those born at home—to receive immediate postnatal care consistent with AAP guidelines. The AAP stresses that providers must be capable of initiating neonatal resuscitation and transferring the newborn to a higher-level care if needed. While its guidance refers to credentialed midwives, it does not specify CPMs, instead aligning with the expectation that all attendants meet nationally and internationally accepted training standards.

=== American College of Nurse Midwives (ACNM) ===
ACNM, representing CNMs and CMs, developed the Certified Midwife (CM) credential as an alternative direct-entry midwifery path. ACNM publicly opposed granting CPMs federal recognition in 2009 due to concerns about variable educational standards ACNM is a participating member in US MERA to align educational standards across midwifery credentials, advocating for independent practice with structured collaboration. Its more recent statements emphasize support for midwives educated to ICM standards, while avoiding direct commentary on the CPM credential.

=== American College of Obstetricians and Gynecologists (ACOG) ===
ACOG supports an integrated maternity care model, stating that hospitals and accredited birth centers are the safest settings for childbirth. ACOG does not support CPMs in its written materials about the healthcare team which includes support for CNMs and AMCB CMs. ACOG recognizes the ICM global standards as the minimum educational benchmark for all midwives, including CPMs, and maintains that only midwives certified by the American Midwifery Certification Board (AMCB) or educated to ICM standards should provide maternity care. In its Committee Opinion No. 697, ACOG stated that home birth may be reasonable in certain cases, but that midwives attending such births should meet ICM standards, be integrated into a regulated health care system, and have access to consultation and safe, timely transport. In its 2018 Joint Statement of Practice Relations Between Obstetrician–Gynecologists and CNMs/CMs, ACOG reaffirmed its support for accredited education, national certification, and formal collaboration between OB-GYNs and CNMs/CMs—without mention of CPMs.

=== March of Dimes ===
March of Dimes advocates for expanding access to midwifery care integrated into the U.S. maternity system and emphasizes that all midwives should meet International Confederation of Midwives (ICM) global standards—specifically, “midwifery refers to certified nurse midwives (CNMs), certified midwives (CMs) or midwives whose education and licensure meets the International Confederation of Midwives (ICM) Global Standards for Midwifery Education.” It explicitly states that it "welcomes the movement towards CPMs meeting the ICM standards," and advocates that all births be attended by providers with licensed, ICM compliant training and access to consultation pathways and safe transport systems. March of Dimes also encourages state-level policies granting full practice authority to midwives educated and credentialed under ICM-equivalent training, which may include CPMs who align with those standards.

== Selected cases and investigations ==
=== Washington Post investigation: Karen Carr ===
The Washington Post did an investigative series focused on CPM oversight and regulatory concerns in the US. It featured the case of a November 2021 home birth in Maryland attended by midwife Karen Carr that resulted in a stillborn baby, Sophie Rose DiVincenzo. The story highlighted that despite prior felony charges and investigations in multiple jurisdictions including a 2010 guilty plea for involuntary manslaughter in Virginia, Carr continued practicing with minimal professional oversight. Critics argue this underscores systemic flaws in tracking midwife histories and enforcing accountability when outcomes are fatal.

The series further reported that state regulators faced substantial backlogs of complaints involving CPMs and other direct-entry midwives, resulting in delayed investigations and limited ability to restrict practice while cases were under review.According to the reporting, complaint records and disciplinary histories were often fragmented across states, and regulators lacked efficient mechanisms for tracking prior enforcement actions when midwives moved between jurisdictions.The Post cited these conditions as contributing to prolonged regulatory inaction, even in cases involving serious adverse outcomes, and characterized the system as one in which accountability frequently occurred only after catastrophic events.

=== USA Today "Failure to Deliver" series ===
A USA Today investigative series examined planned home birth outcomes in the United States and differences among types of midwives, drawing on national vital statistics data, court records, and interviews with clinicians and regulators as home birth rates increased nationwide. The series reported that infants delivered at home by Certified Professional Midwives (CPMs) experienced neonatal mortality rates approximately three times higher than those of infants born in hospitals under midwife care, with the disparity even more pronounced in higher-risk situations such as vaginal birth after cesarean (VBAC), breech presentation, and multiple gestation.

Beyond outcome differences, the investigation identified regulatory and oversight limitations affecting CPM practice. USA Today reported that CPMs were licensed or otherwise legally authorized to practice in many states where adverse outcomes occurred, but that licensure standards, scope-of-practice rules, and enforcement mechanisms varied widely across jurisdictions. The series noted that state licensure did not consistently restrict CPMs from attending higher-risk births or ensure standardized risk screening, emergency preparedness, or formal integration with hospital-based care.

Taken together, the findings reported by USA Today highlighted that state licensure of CPMs did not uniformly translate into effective oversight, with regulators and investigators describing gaps in enforcement, limited mechanisms for early intervention, and challenges in tracking prior complaints or disciplinary actions, even in states where CPM practice was legally authorized.

=== Texas midwife accused of performing illegal abortions ===
In 2025, Texas-based CPM Maria Margarita Rojas was arrested and charged with performing illegal abortions and practicing medicine without a license. The case, which involved the provision of abortion-inducing medication outside of physician oversight, raised new questions about the legal boundaries of CPM practice in states with strict abortion laws.

=== Arizona Maternal and Infant Death ===
In Arizona, a widely reported enforcement case involved Certified Professional Midwife Sarah Kankiewicz, who attended a planned home birth in 2020 that resulted in the deaths of both the mother and the newborn. Following the incident, the Arizona Department of Health Services (ADHS) initiated proceedings to revoke Kankiewicz’s midwifery license, citing repeated violations of state midwifery regulations and prior disciplinary findings. Reporting by ABC15 Arizona indicated that the case represented at least the third instance in which Kankiewicz had been found in violation of Arizona health and safety rules while continuing to practice.

Concerns regarding Kankiewicz’s practice were also raised by other licensed midwives. According to ABC15 Arizona, several Arizona midwives reported that they had previously contacted state regulators and formally urged Kankiewicz to stop practicing midwifery, citing ongoing concerns about scope-of-practice violations and patient safety. The reporting further noted that midwives interviewed described limitations in the state’s ability to intervene promptly or restrict practice once a CPM is licensed, highlighting challenges in enforcing compliance and preventing repeated violations through existing regulatory mechanisms.

== Sociopolitical perspectives ==
The rise of the Certified Professional Midwife (CPM) credential in the United States is often framed within broader conversations about feminism, bodily autonomy, and resistance to medicalization in childbirth. Supporters of CPMs argue that the credential enables women to exercise choice over how and where they give birth, including the right to pursue home birth and reject hospital-based interventions. They contend that the model reflects a grassroots, community-centered approach rooted in reproductive autonomy and historical midwifery traditions.

The CPM credential has also raised questions about the balance between autonomy and regulation in healthcare. While some advocate for licensure to ensure public accountability, others suggest that licensing CPMs when their training does not meet international midwifery education standards, can create public confusion about the standard of care they can expect from the different types of midwives. The ICM does not recognize the CPM as meeting global midwifery standards, which typically require a university-based degree and formal integration into the healthcare system.

The role of CPMs has also intersected with abortion rights and reproductive justice debates. Some midwifery advocates position CPMs within a broader reproductive rights framework, emphasizing their support for client autonomy, bodily integrity, and access to a full spectrum of reproductive healthcare, including abortion. This framing aligns CPM practice with broader movements advocating for reproductive self-determination and resistance to state control over pregnancy and birth.

== See also ==
Midwifery in the United States
