= Joy Marini =

American philanthropist for maternal and infant health

- Born: Twentieth century
- Education: Western Kentucky University (B.S.); University of Medicine and Dentistry of New Jersey (MS); Rider University (MBA)
- Occupation: Philanthropist
- Website: Twitter

Joy Marini is an American executive who is currently the philanthropic director of Johnson & Johnson's international philanthropy regarding maternal and infant health, violence against women, and gender inequality.

== Personal life ==
Marini has a background as a physician's assistant (PA-C), having earned her MS Physician Assistant degree from the University of Medicine and Dentistry of New Jersey in 1997. She received a Master of Business Administration degree from Rider University in international marketing, and Bachelor of Science from Western Kentucky University in animal science and agriculture.

Marini has two children.

== Career ==
Marini became the Director of Corporate Contributions at Johnson & Johnson in 2007, having spent 6 years prior working with the Johnson & Johnson Pediatric Institute.

From her leadership position in the private sector, Marini notes that beyond philanthropic donations, Johnson & Johnson can also offer innovation or social impact bonds, as well as organizing its 127,000 employees as volunteers and offering its corporate expertise to campaigns. She also noted the ability of corporations to use their business networks and local relationships for humanitarian purposes, such as relief for women and children caught in conflicts. She notes that in places where healthcare systems have collapsed, such as during decades of conflict in South Sudan, girls are especially affected, as in South Sudan adolescent girls are more likely to die in childbirth than to finish primary school.

Johnson & Johnson worked to develop an ebola vaccine to address the 2014 ebola outbreak, and also cooperated with the government of Sierra Leone, UNICEF, and the Liverpool School of Tropical Medicine to improve the health system there, focusing on the local health workforce.

Marini has also advocated for empowering midwives, noting gender equity problems and the extreme gender pay gap for women in health, who often cannot go on strike to protest due to their essential work. Johnson & Johnson and the International Confederation of Midwives support leadership programs that help train and empower midwives.

Under her leadership Johnson & Johnson pledged its support in 2016 for the UN Population Fund Safe Birth Even Here campaign to reduce maternal mortality in crisis settings as part of humanitarian responses. In support of the UN Sustainable Development Goal for universal health coverage, she advocated at a 23 September 2019 meeting of global health leaders, where the role of midwives and nurses was a key theme, Marini advocated for inclusivity and technological responsiveness to local needs.

She has served on the board of GBCHealth since 2015, a business coalition for private activity and investment in global health issues.
