= Mamie Odessa Hale =

American public health leader and midwife consultant

- Born: November 19, 1910; Keeneys Creek, West Virginia, U.S.
- Died: July 10, 1979 (aged 68); Pittsburgh, Pennsylvania, U.S.
- Education: Tuskegee School of Nurse-Midwifery for Colored Nurses

Mamie Odessa Hale (November 19, 1910 – July 10, 1979) was a leader in public health and a midwife consultant who worked in Arkansas for the Department of Health from 1945 to 1950. During this time, Hale's objective was to educate and train 'granny midwives.' (These women managed the medical side of pregnancies and assisted in delivery. They also were the ones who completed birth certificates for new born babies.) Her efforts were in place to address the public health disparity between black and white women that was currently evident.

== Early life and education ==
Mamie Odessa Hale was born on November 19, 1910, in Keeneys Creek, West Virginia, as the third child to Emanuel Hale and Minnie Maude Creasy Hale. Hale attended the Tuskegee School of Nurse-Midwifery for Colored Nurses in Alabama in 1941. The school was one of the few programs created to educate African American nurses. The Rosenwald Foundation and Children's Bureau, a government organization used to record and oversee all matters relating to child welfare, funded the school. The school required a bachelor's degree to enroll, but there is no record of where she would have received this education. The school graduated 31 students before its closing in 1946.

== Career ==
Hale began her career in public health in 1942 in the Crittenden County health department. At the time many registered nurses were off contributing to the war effort for World War II, which opened up more opportunities for Hale to further her career. Due to low access to health facilities in rural areas and racial barriers, disparity in the mortality rates of black children became a social issue that had to be handled. Before Hale's involvement, the attempts made by the state to regulate and educate midwives had been unsuccessful. Hale's strong community support of these efforts encouraged many women, on average between 60 and 80 years old, to strive to obtain nursing permits.

From 1945 to 1950, Hale was a midwife consultant for the Arkansas Health Department's Maternal and Child Health Division. After much success Hale was appointed to the role of midwife consultant for the Arkansas Department of Health. In this position, she educated “granny” midwives to become more competent in the delivery of children. While working for the Arkansas Department of Health, Hale planned her 8- to 12-week training program for granny midwives. Many of these women in training were illiterate, so Hale created her program to be demonstration based, consisting of movies, singing, and pictures. After the completion of the full training, the midwives became state certified. Her work with the public health system led to a decrease in the number of deaths of African Americans due to pregnancy and childbirth to only 43 in 1950, in comparison to 128 in 1930. Due to her great influence, Hale gained popularity not only in the medical community, but also in the civil rights movement. Supporters of Hale, both white and black, boycotted restaurants that refused to serve African Americans and called for equality across the country.
