= Direct-entry midwife =

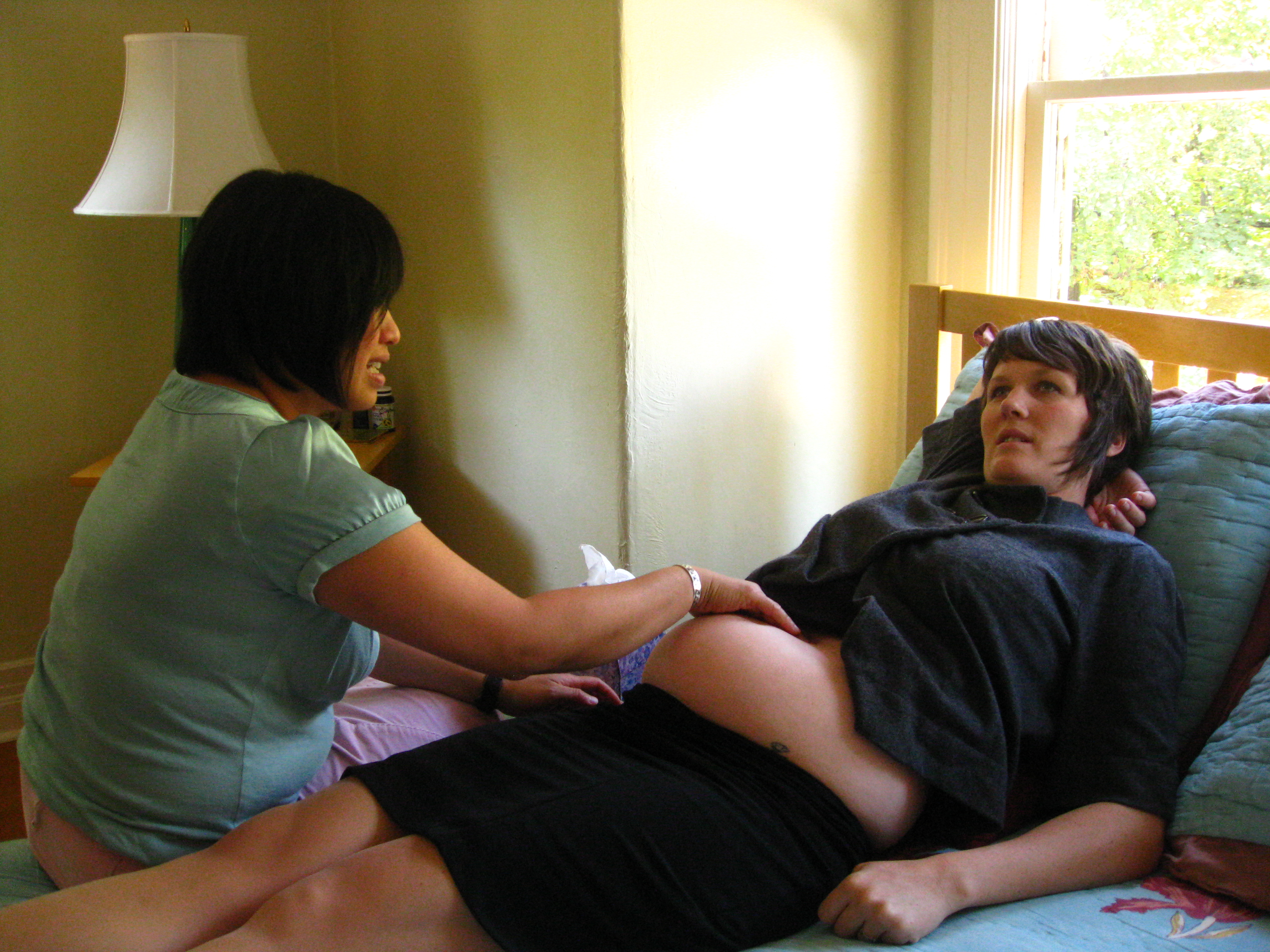
A pregnant woman receives a visit from a midwife in her home.

A direct-entry midwife is a midwifery practitioner who enters the profession without prior nursing education. These midwives may be trained through midwifery schools, formal academic programs, apprenticeships, or self-study, depending on national standards and regulations.

== Direct-entry midwifery in the United States ==
In the United States, direct-entry midwifery refers to several professional pathways that do not require prior licensure as a registered nurse. These include:

Certified Midwives (CMs), who hold a graduate degree in midwifery and are certified by the American Midwifery Certification Board (AMCB). While CMs complete the same midwifery education and pass the same national certification exam as Certified Nurse Midwives (CNMs), they do not hold a nursing license. CM practice is legally recognized in a limited number of U.S. states.

Certified Professional Midwives (CPMs), who are credentialed by the North American Registry of Midwives (NARM) and are educated through supervised apprenticeships or educational programs. CPMs primarily attend births in homes or freestanding birth centers.

Lay midwives, who may be trained through informal apprenticeships or self-education and are not certified by a national credentialing body. Their legal status varies widely by state.

Traditional birth attendants (TBAs), may rely on community-based or culturally specific knowledge and often operate outside the formal healthcare system. While TBAs are more commonly referenced in global health contexts, the term is sometimes used in the U.S. to describe unlicensed midwives practicing in traditional or marginalized settings.

== International use of direct-entry midwives ==
In many countries, direct-entry midwifery is the standard pathway to becoming a midwife, rather than a branch of nursing. This model is common across Europe, Australia, New Zealand, and several low- and middle-income countries.

In the United Kingdom, midwifery is a distinct profession regulated by the Nursing and Midwifery Council (NMC), but it is not a nursing specialty. Most midwives qualify through direct-entry university degree programs, which typically span three years and include both academic and clinical components. Although there is an option for registered nurses to complete a shortened midwifery training program, this is not the norm.

Other countries where direct-entry midwifery is standard include:

The Netherlands, where midwives are autonomous primary care providers for pregnancy and birth, trained through a four-year bachelor's degree program specific to midwifery.

Australia and New Zealand, where midwifery is a regulated, direct-entry profession with university-based education pathways.

In low-resource settings, traditional birth attendants (TBAs) often serve as the primary providers of maternity care in rural or underserved areas. TBAs are typically not formally trained or regulated but may have extensive community-based experience. Global health initiatives have sometimes supported short-term training for TBAs to improve maternal outcomes, although their integration into formal health systems remains debated.

== Standards of education for direct-entry midwives ==
The quality and scope of education for direct-entry midwives varies significantly worldwide, depending on national regulation, credentialing bodies, and institutional oversight. To establish a global benchmark, the International Confederation of Midwives (ICM) developed the Global Standards for Midwifery Education, which apply to both direct-entry and post-nursing midwifery programs.

According to ICM, a qualified midwife is “a person who has successfully completed a midwifery education programme that is based on the ICM Essential Competencies for Midwifery Practice and is duly recognized in the country where it is located.” The standards require midwifery education to include:

- A minimum of 36 months (approximately 4,600 hours) of instruction

- Both academic education and clinical practice under supervision

- Training in autonomous care for the full scope of maternal and newborn health, including antenatal, intrapartum, postpartum, and newborn care

- Access to interprofessional collaboration, referral pathways, and regulatory oversight

These standards are used to guide midwifery education programs globally, including direct-entry models in countries such as the United Kingdom, the Netherlands, Australia, and New Zealand. Midwives educated to ICM standards are expected to function as primary care providers for women and newborns across the reproductive continuum.

In the United States, some credentialing pathways for direct-entry midwives—such as the Certified Midwife (CM)—align with international standards through graduate-level, accredited midwifery programs. Others, such as the Certified Professional Midwife (CPM) credential, include alternative and apprenticeship-based pathways do not meet the educational duration and institutional requirements set forth by ICM. Lay midwives and TBA do not meet ICM standards.

== Legality of direct-entry midwifery in the United States ==
While direct-entry midwifery is popular and legal in many cultures around the world, it struggles to gain legality in several states in the U.S. Nurse-midwives can practice legally in all 50 states. However, direct entry midwives like Certified Professional Midwives and Certified Midwives, lay midwives and Traditional midwives are not legally recognized in all states.

In the United States, Penalties for practicing as a midwife without a licensed credential range from a misdemeanor to a Class C Felony. Charges may include practicing medicine or practicing nurse midwifery.
