= NARM (disambiguation) =

NARM was the National Association of Recording Merchandisers, now renamed as the Music Business Association.

NARM may also refer to:

- North Alabama Railroad Museum
- North American Reciprocal Museums
- North American Registry of Midwives, a certifying organization for midwives launched by the Midwives Alliance of North America

== See also ==
- Narrm, Boonwurrung/Woiwurrung name for Melbourne, Australia
