= Angela Murdaugh =

American nun and nurse (born 1940)

Angela Murdaugh (September 15, 1940 – October 2024) was an American Catholic religious sister in the Franciscan Sisters of Mary, a Certified Nurse-Midwife. She was a pioneer in promoting nurse midwives and birth centers. Out of this passion, she founded the Holy Family Birth Center in Weslaco, TX in 1983.

The birthing center was successful in many ways and became a model for others. "By 2002 the infant mortality rate in Hidalgo County was cut in half due to the center, declared so successful that it was emulated nationally." She trained midwives there and worked with local schools and factories to teach about health, especially as related to pregnancy and baby care. She was involved in the developing of policies and laws related to midwifery practice and birth centers in Texas. On the national level she was also instrumental in writing National Association of Childbearing Center's Standards for Birth Centers. Also, she contributed to the recognition of nurse-midwives as qualified Medicaid providers, being honored by receiving the first Medicaid provider number issued to a nurse midwife in Texas.

Sr. Murdaugh "credits her decision to become a certified nurse midwife in part to Sr. Mary Charitas Iffrig, who introduced her to natural childbirth." She retired from Holy Family Birth Center in 2007.

== Honors ==
- Elected president of the American College of Nurse Midwives
- Midwives Alliance of North American gave her their highest honor—the Sage Femme Award
- Named to Texas Women's Hall of Fame (2002)
- Texas Nurse of the Year Award (1978),
- American College of Nurse Midwives Hattie Hemschemeyer Award (1990)
- Social Justice Award (1998)
- Doctor of Humane Letters from Villanova University (2005)
