= Hilda H. Kroeger =

Dr. Hilda H. Kroeger (1903–1993) was an American physician of Pittsburgh. A specialist in maternity treatment, Kroeger assisted in designing “an efficient labor and delivery-room suite,” nearly 20 years before the development of the Alternative Birth Centers (ABC’s) for women. The suite was developed in the Elizabeth Steel Magee Hospital in her home city, where Dr. Kroeger was named one of the “Medical Women of the Year” in 1955 for her achievement. She also became the director of the Division of Maternal and Child’s Health for the State Department of Health since 1941 and was awarded a two-year fellowship by the U.S. Public Health Service to study hospital administration at Yale University, New Haven, Conn. Hilda has also given short talks to schools in Arizona on health, athletic, and recreation subjects.

Kroeger also backed up a large amount of work that went towards re-decorating the hospital sunrooms in the E-Wing of Elizabeth Steel Magee Hospital published in the Pittsburgh Post-Gazette on November 14, 1956. The article includes descriptions of baby blue and pink color schemes, coral pink shades, hand-block printed draperies, and much more. Aside from completing work with hospital rooms, Dr. Kroeger spoke about children's needs and opportunity at the women's luncheon. This book presents articles regarding children involved in agricultural labor and how the health physicians, including Hilda Kroeger, work to provide daycare and education for these children. Hilda also participated in lab tests, testing human blood serum and urine, to see if it resulted in crystalline according to her study with Ludvig Hektoen.
