= Certified nurse-midwife =

Advanced practice nurse who provides mid-level nursing and midwifery care

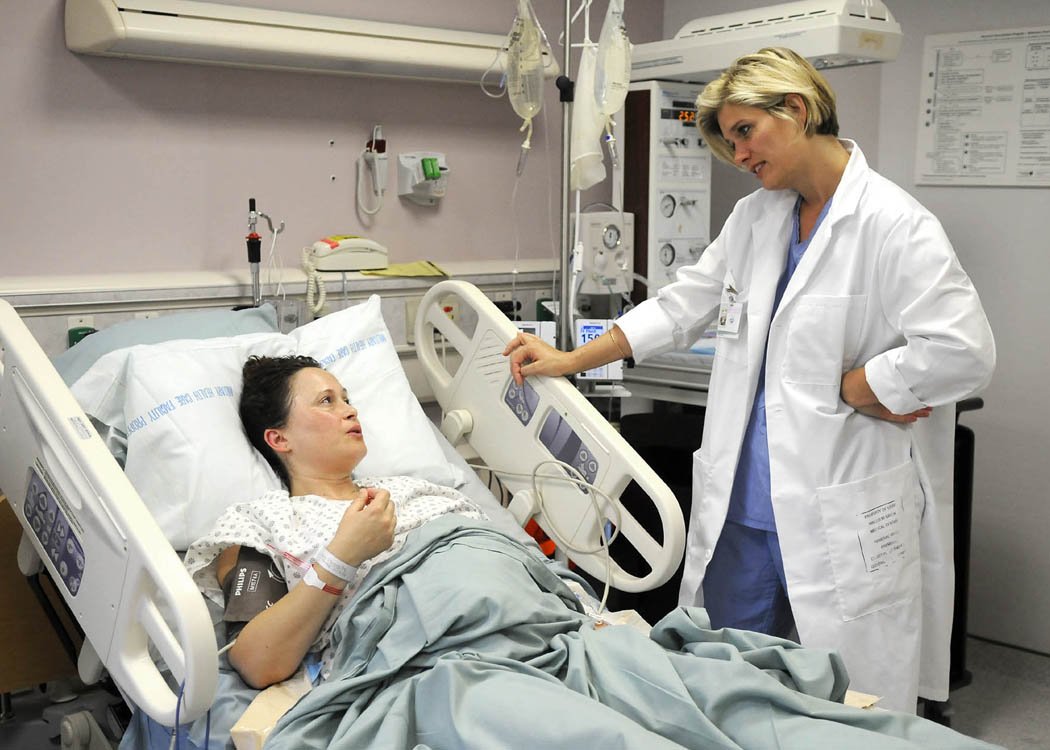
US Navy CNM checks on a mother.

In the United States, a Certified Nurse-Midwife (CNM) is a nurse midwife who exceeds the International Confederation of Midwives' essential competencies for a midwife and is also an advanced practice registered nurse, having completed registered nursing and midwifery education leading to practice as a nurse midwife and credentialing as a Certified Nurse-Midwife. CNMs provide care of women across their lifespan, including pregnancy and the postpartum period, and well woman care and birth control. Certified Nurse-Midwives are recognized by the International Confederation of Midwives as a type of midwife in the U.S.

== Education and training ==
A Certified Nurse Midwife (CNM) is an advanced practice registered nurse who has specialized education and training in nurse midwifery. The CNM certification process includes first completing the required education and then passing a national exam. CNM candidates must complete a nursing degree as well as a nurse-midwifery education program accredited by the Accreditation Commission for Midwifery Education (ACME). The nurse midwifery education program is a post-baccalaureate program that requires a bachelor's degree and may sometimes also require a registered nurse (RN) license.

Since 2010, all CNMs are required to possess a minimum of a graduate degree such as a Master of Science in Nursing (MSN) or a new doctoral degree in nursing, the Doctor of Nursing Practice (DNP). Thus, recent graduates from an accredited CNM education program are awarded at least a master's degree. After completing the required education in nurse midwifery, CNM candidates are eligible to take the national certifying exam administered by the American Midwifery Certification Board (AMCB). Recertification take place is every five years.

The American College of Nurse-Midwives accredits midwifery education programs and serves as the national specialty society for the nation's CNMs and Certified Midwives (CMs). CNMs in most states are required to:

- possess a minimum of a graduate degree, such as the Master of Science in Nursing or Master of Science in Midwifery or a Doctorate of Nursing Practice or a Doctorate in Midwifery
- pass the NCLEX examination to become a registered nurse
- pass the American Midwifery Certification Board exam
- hold a state license to practice midwifery or nurse-midwifery
- keep up to date on latest knowledge as pertains to their field

== Practice ==
As of March 2009, the American College of Nurse-Midwives represents over 11,000 Certified Nurse-Midwives (CNMs) and Certified Midwives (CMs) in all 50 states and most US territories. In 2005, Certified Nurse-Midwives attended more than 10% of vaginal births in the United States. In terms of gender, only 2% of CNMs are men. In addition to providing care related to low-risk pregnancy and childbirth, CNMs are also able to attend to women's reproductive health needs from puberty through menopause as well as for the care of their newborns. Additionally, they are able to prescribe some medications, use certain medical devices, and implement therapeutic and diagnostic measures.

CNMs practice in hospitals and private practice medical clinics and may also deliver babies in birthing centers and attend at-home births. Some work with academic institutions as professors. They are able to prescribe medications, treatments, medical devices, therapeutic and diagnostic measures. CNMs are able to provide medical care to women from puberty through menopause, including care for their newborn (neonatology), antepartum, intrapartum, postpartum and nonsurgical gynecological care. In some cases, CNMs may also provide care to the male partner, in areas of sexually transmitted diseases and reproductive health, of their female patients. In the United States, fewer than 1% of nurse midwives are men.

CNMs function as primary healthcare providers for women and most often provide medical care for relatively healthy women, whose health and births are considered uncomplicated and not "high risk," as well as their neonates. Often, women with high risk pregnancies can receive the benefits of midwifery care from a CNM in collaboration with a physician. CNMs may work closely or in collaboration with an obstetrician & gynecologist, who provides consultation and/or assistance to patients who develop complications or have complex medical histories or disease(s). CNMs provide health care for sexual health, as they also see women for routine exams and are able to initiate all types of contraception.

CNMs are able to practice in all settings, including hospitals, birth centers, and private homes. However, the majority of CNMs attend hospital births. A majority of CNMs are employed by hospitals and medical centers (32.7%) or physician practice (30.5%). Midwives attend a majority of home births in the United States. In 2009, over 62% of home births in the United States were attended by midwives, with 19.5% as certified nurse midwives (CNMs) and 42.9% as "other midwives" (i.e. direct-entry).

CNMs can legally practice in all 50 states and the District of Columbia. Current legal issues regarding midwifery are largely state-specific. On October 20, 2012, the Alabama Birth Coalition organized a "Walk 4 Midwives" in Huntsville to raise awareness of Alabama's law that prohibits midwives from attending home births. Currently, it is legal to give birth at home in Alabama, but that birth cannot be attended by anyone, including midwives. Proponents of midwives have been trying to introduce a bill to change the law for the past nine years when it was finally made it out of committee in 2011. Because the session ended right when that happened, no action has yet been taken. Recently in Texas, a group of midwives working on the U.S.-Mexican border have been found guilty of selling false birth certificates. Their verdict has caused U.S. Customs and Border Protection to question the validity of birth certificates of many people birthed by these midwives and others along the border.

== History ==
Beginning in the late eighteenth century, a significant number of physicians started to attend births. Their prominence in childbirth increased drastically into the turn of the twentieth century, almost rendering midwives obsolete. However, the increase of physician-attended births coincided with an increase demand of newly arrived European immigrants who have been accustomed to midwifery from their cultures. Moreover, poor women and African Americans, particularly those living in the South, traditionally employed midwives as well. In fact, in the early twentieth century, midwives attended as many as 90 percent of all black births in the southern states. For reasons of culture, language, and cost, midwives did not completely disappear despite the rise in physician-attended births at the turn of the twentieth century.

In the early 1900s, traditional midwives came under fire in what has been called the “midwife problem” when they became scapegoats for American's high infant mortality rate. Despite findings from the White House Conference on Child Health and Protection, the Committee on the Costs of Medical Care, and the New York Academy of Medicine that point to physicians rather than midwives as the cause of these high mortality rates, many still blamed midwives for their “ignorant” and “dirty” ways. Scholars believe these traditional midwives became an easy target because of their status as African Americans or immigrants. Additionally, these early midwives lacked formal training, which made physicians even more suspicious of their practice.

The poor stereotypes of midwives, coupled with a declining birth rate and a shift of birth from the home to the hospital, decreased a demand of midwives. Moreover, national immigration policy in the 1920s temporarily ended immigrations from many parts of Europe, effectively stopping the flow of European midwives. In the ensuing decades, midwifery declined in major cities. Between 1903 and 1912 in Washington D.C., midwife-attended births dropped from 50 percent to 15 percent. Similarly, in New York City, midwives attended 30 percent of all births in 1919 and only 12 percent in 1929. These trends spread from the northeast across the United States such that midwives no longer attended the majority of births in the country by the 1930s.

While some public health officials, pediatricians, and social workers wanted to eliminate midwifery, others did not think this would solve the problem. In the 1910s and 1920s, S. Josephine Baker, director of the New York City Bureau of Child Hygiene, advocated to keep midwives because many immigrants and African-Americans whom midwives have traditionally served could not afford the care of physicians. As such, the solution of the “midwife problem” was to train, license, and regulate them.

== Professionalization ==
Early regulation and training of midwives had begun in the early 1900s. In 1911, New York City opened the first municipally sponsored American midwifery school called the Bellevue Hospital School for Midwives. Sara Josephine Baker played a prominent role in establishing the school. The school mostly enrolled Italian, German, Polish, and Hungarian immigrants and provided them with eight months of training in prenatal care, postnatal care, and deliveries. Additionally, the deliveries attended by midwives trained by Bellevue had lower maternal and infant mortality rates than citywide statistics.

Around the same time, some advocated for the creation of nurse-midwifery, extending the role of a nurse to specialize in midwifery practices. In a paper presented to the National Organization for Public Health Nursing in 1914, Dr. Frederick J. Taussing wrote that “the nurse midwife will […] prove to be the most sympathetic, the most economical, and the most efficient agent in the case of normal confinement.” In the next couple of decades, there were several short-lived attempts to create nurse-midwifery training, including the Maternity Center Association (MCA) in New York City in 1923 and the Manhattan Midwifery School in 1925.

Finally in 1925, Mary Breckinridge, a British-trained American public health nurse, formed the Frontier Nursing Service (FNS) in Kentucky. The mission of FNS was to provide nurse midwife care for mothers and infants who live in an isolated area without access to healthcare. Indeed, the Appalachian Mountains of eastern Kentucky where FNS was located had some of the highest maternal and infant mortality rates in the nation. Statistics on the maternal mortality rate of FNS is significantly lower compared to state- and nationwide data. In the late 1920s, FNS hired renowned statistician Louis Israel Dublin to compile their statistics. He showed that the maternal mortality rate (per 10,000) of FNS between 1925 and 1937 was 6.6 compared to 44 to 53 of Kentucky whites and 48.9 to 69.5 of the United States.

Later in 1931, Rose “Rosie” McNaught successfully implemented MCA's nurse-midwifery program its second time, modeled after the FNS. McNaught worked at FNS as a staff nurse before Breckinridge sent her to New York City to set up MCA. MCA pioneered midwifery in two ways. First, in February 1932, MCA opened the nation's second nurse-midwifery school called the Lobenstine School of Midwifery, named after Ralph W. Lobenstine, an obstetrician and one of the founders of the school. The two goals of the Lobenstein School were to “1) supervise and teach untrained midwives and 2) bring skilled maternity care […] to women in remote rural areas.” The MCA modeled its midwifery curriculum after European, particularly British examples. It required registered nurses to complete a ten-month midwifery program. Secondly, around the same time in 1931, MCA established the Lobenstine Midwifery Clinic, which served predominately poor African Americans or Puerto Ricans in Harlem who needed the services. The Midwifery Clinic encouraged prenatal care for its patients, who averaged 7.7 prenatal visits from 1933 to 1952. In incidents of complications, midwives at the Clinic would also refer patients to the care of a physician. These efforts certainly contributed to the low maternal mortality rate at the MCA. Between 1932 and 1936, MCA births had a maternal mortality rate of 10 (per 10,000) compared to 104 for New York City and 56.8 to 63.3 for the nation.

Despite the success of these early efforts to establish professional status of midwives, midwifery failed to make a significant comeback. In the following decades, childbirths almost completely moved to the hospital where they were managed by physicians. At the onset of World War II, more than half of births were in hospitals. In the early 1950s, that number rose to 90 percent and finally over 99 percent by the early 1970s.

During this time, nurse-midwives have been described to struggle to find their place. In the 1954 annual convention of the American Nurses Association, nurse-midwives paved the way for the creation of the American College of Nurse-Midwifery (ACNM) in 1955. ACNM was later renamed to the American College of Nurse-Midwives in 1969 and continues to establish legal status and to set standards for the training and regulation of midwives.

== See also ==
- Mary Breckinridge, founder of Frontier Nursing Service
- Childbirth
- Doula
- Nurse practitioner
- Obstetrical nursing
- Birth attendant
- Natural childbirth
- Frontier Nursing Service
