= Margaret Charles Smith =

African-American midwife (1906–2004)

- Born: September 12, 1906; Eutaw, Alabama, U.S.
- Died: November 12, 2004 (aged 98); Eutaw, Alabama, U.S.

Margaret Charles Smith (September 12, 1906–November 12, 2004) was an African-American midwife, who became known for her extraordinary skill over a long career, spanning over thirty years. Despite working primarily in rural areas with women who were often in poor health, she lost very few of the more than 3000 babies she delivered, and none of the mothers in childbirth. In 1949, she became one of the first official midwives in Green County, Alabama, and she was still practicing in 1976, when the state passed a law outlawing traditional midwifery. In the 1990s, she cowrote a book about her career, Listen to Me Good: The Life Story of an Alabama Midwife, and in 2010 she was inducted into the Alabama Women's Hall of Fame.

== Early life ==
Margaret Charles was born in Eutaw, Alabama on September 12, 1906. About 3 weeks later her mother, Bueha Sanders, died. Charles was raised by her grandparents on their farm. She was named after her grandmother, also Margaret Charles, who was a former slave and midwife. She attended a rural grammar school in her hometown of Eutaw, Alabama, but the demands of farming often interrupted her schooling, and she left school entirely at age 16 when her grandfather died.

== Midwife career ==
Also known as "Miss Margaret", Smith was first introduced to midwifery around the young age of five year old, while attending the bedside during the birth of an infant of her future husband's cousin's wife. Smith "caught" the infant as the birth took place before the midwife was able to arrive. Though she became interested in midwifery in her teens, she began training only in her late thirties, with a local midwife named Ella Anderson. In 1949, Greene County issued a permit for Smith to practice midwifery, making her one of the county's first official midwives. In that era, "granny midwives" (as lay African-American midwives like Smith were informally called) were crucial to the lives of Southern black women because most hospitals would not admit them as patients. Smith worked in three local clinics alongside medical doctors for twenty-eight years assisting in the transition to modern medicine and medical routines. Sometimes the mothers that Smith would provide midwifery services for could not afford to pay Smith anything for her services, or would pay in produce. The nominal price for birthing a baby when she began practicing midwifery was five dollars per birth attended.

During her 35-year career, Smith delivered over 3000 babies to mothers who were often malnourished and in poor health. Despite this, she lost very few babies and none of the mothers in childbirth. During the period in which she practiced (ca. 1945–ca. 1980), infant mortality among African-American women ranged from around 74 to around 22 per thousand babies born, levels that underline how remarkable her own record was.

In 1976, Alabama outlawed traditional midwifery, but Smith was allowed to continue on for a while due to her record and experience. She received her last permit to practice midwifery in 1981. The state later passed laws allowing nurse-midwives to practice in hospitals.

In 1996, Smith cowrote a book about her life, Listen to Me Good: The Life Story of an Alabama Midwife. Her coauthor, Linda Janet Holmes, is a research scientist and board member of the National Black Women's Health Project. In her review in the Bulletin of the History of Medicine, Charlotte G. Borst wrote that this book transcends the genre of midwife memoirs by examining "the larger context of class and race relations in a state that was at the epicenter of the Civil Rights struggle." Published by Ohio State University Press, it won the press's Helen Hooven Santmyer prize.

== Personal life ==
During her school-aged years, Margaret met a man by the name of Randolph Smith in a one roomed segregated schoolhouse in Eutaw Alabama and ended up falling in love. Against the wishes of her grandmother, Margaret Smith, the couple married in 1943. The couple resided on Smith's grandmother's farm where Randolph Smith ended up taking on hog farming, which led to being the main source of income for the Smith family.

Smith gave birth to three sons, Spencer Charles, Huston Charles, and Herman Smith, her first son was born while she was still in her teens. She served as her own midwife for her second birth, her others accompanied by midwives. She also served as the midwife for the first born daughter of her son Spencer and his wife Betty. The tradition continued with her being present at the birth of her granddaughter's first child.

== Later life and death ==
Smith and her family continued to live and work on the farm in Eutaw, Alabama throughout Smith's life until just before her death. Despite health issues (including hypertension and peripheral vascular disease), Smith lived to be 98 years old, dying in 2004.

== Honors and legacy ==
In 1983, Smith was given the keys to Eutaw, the first black American to receive this honor.

In 1985, she was honored by the National Black Women's Health Project.

In 1997, Smith was the keynote speaker at the New Orleans Rural Health Initiative.

In 2003, she was honored by the Congressional Black Caucus in Washington, D.C.

In 2004, she was given a lifetime achievement award at the Black Midwife and Healer's Conference.

In 2008, a documentary film about Smith's life was released. Entitled Miss Margaret, it was directed by Diana Paul.

In 2010, Smith was inducted into the Alabama Women's Hall of Fame.
