= Midwives in the United States =

Midwives in the United States assist childbearing women during pregnancy, labor and birth, and the postpartum period. Some midwives also provide primary care for women including well-woman exams, health promotion, and disease prevention, family planning options, and care for common gynecological concerns. Before the turn of the 20th century, traditional midwives were informally trained and helped deliver almost all births. Today, midwives are professionals who must undergo formal training. Midwives in the United States formed the Midwifery Education, Regulation, and Association (US-MERA) task force to establish a framework for midwifery.

== History ==
Childbirth in the United States has traditionally been attended by midwives.

=== Early lay midwifery (colonial era–19th century) ===
In colonial America, childbirth was largely managed by women, with midwives serving as the main caregivers across all communities. Enslaved African women, Indigenous healers, and immigrant women brought diverse practices to midwifery.

During the 17th century, the English colonies strictly had women midwives attend childbirths. Town records indicate some well-known midwives including Bridget Fuller (d. 1664) who practiced in the Massachusetts Bay Colony and Mrs. Wiat of Dorchester (d. 1705) who attended over 1,000 births. Others such as Ruth Barnaby (1664–1765) and Elizabeth Phillips (1685–1761) practiced for over forty years. While Elizabeth Phillips was trained in London before continuing her practice in Boston, other midwives such as Ann Eliot may have acquired medical skills through their husbands.

Similarly, in the Dutch colony of New Netherland, women were also established in midwifery practices. In 1633 in New Amsterdam, the colonists constructed a building for the official midwife. This position was held by Mrs. Trynje in 1644 and Hellegond Joris in 1655. Later in 1658, the Dutch councilors of New Amsterdam appointed midwife Hilletje Wilbruch to oversee a new hospital.

The English later took over New Amsterdam and renamed it New York, and women continued to be prominent in midwifery. New York City began licensing midwives in 1716. Midwives remained central in rural and marginalized communities into the 19th century.

=== Early 20th-century regulation of midwifery ===
By the early 1900s, medical professionals began a campaign to professionalize childbirth, often framing midwives as unscientific or unsafe. Joseph DeLee and others promoted hospital birth and obstetric intervention, leading to a decline in midwife-attended births from around 50% in 1900 to 15% by 1930. The Sheppard–Towner Maternity and Infancy Act of 1921 funded midwifery training and regulation, which often marginalized traditional and "granny" midwives unable to meet new licensure requirements. These changes disproportionately impacted Black and Indigenous midwives.

=== Emergence of nurse-midwifery (1920s–1950s) ===
Formal nurse-midwifery emerged in the U.S. in 1925 with the founding of the Frontier Nursing Service (FNS) by Mary Breckinridge in rural Kentucky, inspired by British nurse-midwifery models. The FNS aimed to address poor maternal and infant health outcomes in underserved Appalachian communities through skilled nursing and midwifery services.

Breckinridge's nurse-midwives were educated at the Lobenstine Midwifery School in New York and trained in England and Scotland before serving in the U.S. They combined public health nursing with midwifery and dramatically reduced maternal and infant mortality in their regions.

The American Association of Nurse-Midwives was founded in 1929 and later evolved into the American College of Nurse-Midwives (ACNM), formally incorporated in 1955. ACNM standardized midwifery education and certification, requiring a nursing degree, midwifery graduate education, and supervised clinical training. Nurse-midwives practiced in public health settings, Native American reservations, and urban clinics, maintaining strong ties to organized medicine and nursing.

Despite their contributions, nurse-midwives remained a small part of the healthcare system during this era. By 1955, only a few dozen nurse-midwives practiced in the U.S., constrained by limited educational programs and restrictive state regulations.

=== Homebirth revival and lay midwifery in the 1970s ===
In the early 1970s, nearly all U.S. births occurred in hospitals, yet a countercultural homebirth movement emerged independently of formal nurse-midwifery pathways. These births were often attended by lay or self-trained individuals who self-identified as 'midwives' operating outside of established medical systems. Influenced by feminist ideals, natural health movements, and critiques of medicalized birth, this era saw a revival of community-based, non-institutional maternity care.

The movement produced influential figures and texts, including Ina May Gaskin's Spiritual Midwifery and Raven Lang's The Birth Book. Centers like the Farm Midwifery Center in Tennessee exemplified the model of communal, spiritual, and low-intervention childbirth. Events such as the 1974 "Bowland Bust" in Santa Cruz, where midwives were arrested for practicing without licenses, highlighted tensions between lay midwives and the state.

This revival filled a gap in maternity care for women seeking alternatives to hospital birth. However, the lack of standardized education, certification, or integration with emergency services prompted concern from medical institutions and professional midwifery organizations.

=== Professionalization of lay midwifery (1990s–2000s) ===
Following the homebirth revival of the 1970s, lay midwifery ranged widely in training, oversight, and outcomes. A series of poor maternal and neonatal outcomes in unregulated settings, alongside high-profile legal cases, prompted concern among both advocates and policymakers. In states lacking licensure frameworks, direct-entry midwives could face charges such as practicing medicine without a license, and in some cases, criminal liability following adverse events.

These issues contributed to the push to formalize education, certification, and legal recognition through new credentials. The Certified Professional Midwife (CPM) was created in 1994 by the North American Registry of Midwives to provide a competency-based pathway for non-nurse midwives. In parallel, the Certified Midwife (CM) credential was launched by the American College of Nurse-Midwives in 1997 to offer a graduate-level, direct-entry route aligned with national CNM standards.

=== Contemporary midwifery ===
Midwifery today includes three nationally recognized credentials: CNM, CM, and CPM as well as lay midwives and traditional birth attendants who are often referred to as midwives by consumers who use them. Consumers and even professionals often conflate these roles, leading to confusion and policy missteps. A 2020 ACNM‑member survey found that nearly one in three clinicians lacked full understanding of credential differences.

This confusion has hampered regulatory efforts, as state laws sometimes group all "midwives" under a single umbrella, inadvertently penalizing low‑risk, well‑trained providers or making licensure unnecessarily restrictive for some groups. A 2016 policy review identified a patchwork of state regulations that "tear every sect down," with several states creating overlapping or contradictory titles and scopes of practice between CNMs, CMs, CPMs, and traditional birth attendants.

Efforts like the US Midwifery Education, Regulation, and Association (US MERA) have called for unified educational standards and clear credential terminology to reduce confusion and better integrate midwives into healthcare systems.

==== Direct-entry midwives ====
In the United States, direct-entry midwifery refers to several professional pathways that do not require prior licensure as a registered nurse. These include:

Certified Midwives (CMs), who hold a graduate degree in midwifery and are certified by the American Midwifery Certification Board (AMCB). While CMs complete the same midwifery education and pass the same national certification exam as Certified Nurse Midwives (CNMs), they do not hold a nursing license. CM practice is legally recognized in a limited number of U.S. states.

Certified Professional Midwives (CPMs), who are credentialed by the North American Registry of Midwives (NARM) and are educated through supervised apprenticeships or educational programs. CPMs primarily attend births in homes or freestanding birth centers.

Lay midwives, who may be trained through informal apprenticeships or self-education and are not certified by a national credentialing body. Their legal status varies widely by state.

Traditional birth attendants (TBAs), may rely on community-based or culturally specific knowledge and often operate outside the formal healthcare system. While TBAs are more commonly referenced in global health contexts, the term is sometimes used in the U.S. to describe unlicensed midwives practicing in traditional or marginalized settings.

== Granny midwife ==
=== History ===
Granny midwife is a name used to refer to traditional African American midwives in the (typically rural) South. Though the term was used by federal and state governments derogatorily to suggest ignorance, it was also used by the midwives themselves and reclaimed from its derogatory connotation to instead connote the wisdom of age of the granny. Granny midwives were historically lay midwives, but many granny midwives who practice today combine nurse-midwife training with traditional granny midwifery methods.

According to scholar Sharon Robinson, the first black lay midwife arrived in what is now America in 1619. She came from Africa as an enslaved woman and served her community as a midwife and as a physical and spiritual healer. During the reign of slavery in the United States, nearly every large Southern plantation, particularly in South Carolina, had at least one knowledgeable midwife-healer. There is evidence that some freedwomen served as midwives on the plantations of their former masters for no charge to the plantation. In some cases, plantation masters even rented out their enslaved grannies to neighboring plantations for additional income.

Black midwives were not only common in slave communities, they were also revered as elder healers. Their spiritual and medicinal knowledge gained them special social status in their communities. An important component of granny midwifery was this spiritual knowledge and authority; granny midwives considered themselves to have been spiritually called to the work of healing and midwifery. In South Carolina, Angolan and Kongo constructions of ancestral spirits were important tenets of religion, and granny midwives had unique understandings of the workings of such spirits as they were keepers of spiritual knowledge.

Black lay midwives, or granny midwives, continued providing essential healthcare services to their communities after the abolition of slavery and into the 19th, 20th, and 21st centuries. At the start of the 20th century, specifically between 1900 and 1940, the professionalization of obstetrics and gynecology lead to a campaign against all lay midwives by the United States government, but especially the racialized figure of the granny midwife in the American south. Increased regulatory legislation of lay midwives at the state level between 1900 and 1930 was a key facet of the campaign against granny midwives.

In 1921, the Sheppard-Towner Maternity and Infancy Protection Act afforded federal funds for midwifery training programs to state health departments. States used this money to create training and regulatory programs for lay midwives. By the year 1933, most states passed mandatory birth registration and certificate laws. These laws complicated the work of granny midwives significantly, particularly because they lived in rural settings where illiteracy was common and access to registration filing facilities was more limited than in urban areas. In her dissertation tracing the history of African-American midwifery, scholar Kelena Reid Maxwell examined portrayals of African-American midwives in historical medical journals, the profiles of granny midwives serving in the 30s and 40s in the American South, and many other primary historical documents. She notes that both the training and regulatory programs and mandatory registration and certificate laws jointly contributed to the diminishing number of midwives in places like Macon County, Alabama. In her words, "Macon County, Alabama ran a well-documented campaign against African-American midwives," and tried to forbid midwives who could not or would not work with the state from practicing altogether.

Another facet of the campaign against midwives and towards greater professionalization and exclusivity in obstetrics was the development and expense of medical technology. Traditional midwifery techniques were constructed as inferior to newly marketed obstetric technology, such as forceps. The United States government developed pamphlets and posters to spread this message, among others, to the American population. Included in such publications was information equating black midwifery with "witchcraft" and "witch doctors" of West Africa, as well as with uncleanliness and ignorance.

State and federal campaigns against lay midwives had deleterious effects on the numbers of practicing midwives in the American South. In her book, Granny Midwives and Black Women Writers: Double-Dutched Readings, scholar Valerie Lee notes that a federal survey of lay midwives in the 1920s found 42,627 predominantly black midwives were practicing in the United States and serving predominantly black communities. These percentages declined somewhat over the next twenty years, though more than 60 percent of black women giving birth in the South in 1937 were still attended by granny midwives, while only 10 percent of white babies births were attended by individuals other than physicians. By 1940, 22 percent of black women were giving birth in hospitals, compared to 56 percent of white women. These numbers would drop dramatically over the next six decades, with granny midwives coming to make up a small minority of birth attendants by the 21st century.

In Listen to me Good, the autobiography of Alabama granny midwife Margaret Charles Smith, as recorded by Linda Janet Holmes, Smith relates her life story as a granny midwife in Alabama in the late 20th century. Mrs. Smith was licensed to practice midwifery by the state in the late 1940s, after Alabama began to regulate lay midwives. At the time, becoming a registered midwife in Smith's home of Greene County, Alabama required either a state-run month-long lay midwifery training course or a nurse-midwifery education that could take several years. In addition to formally recognized training, granny midwives seeking to be registered had to be recommended and supported by two physicians and demonstrate cleanliness and Christian morals. Mrs. Smith attended her last birth in 1980. Mrs. Smith is an example of a granny midwife who practiced in some capacity up until the end of the last century.

In Motherwit: An Alabama's Midwife Story, Onnie Lee Logan narrated her entire life to Katherine Clark regarding her granny midwife career, her upbringing, and the racism Logan and her family faced while living in Alabama. Between the years 1931 and 1984, Logan delivered nearly every child in Prichard and Crichton—areas that were predominantly black in Mobile County, Alabama. Logan was licensed in 1949 and was the last legal and practicing granny midwife when Alabama outlawed midwifery in 1976. Despite the law, Logan was allowed to practice until 1984.

There are several organizations in existence to day that are dedicated to preserving traditional Black midwifery knowledge and increasing the number of Black midwives and healers. Examples of such organizations include the International Center for Traditional Childbearing, located in Portland, Oregon, and Birth in the Tradition: Traditional Midwifery, Monitrice, and Doula Services in the state of Georgia.

==== Training ====
Before the professionalization of obstetrics and the United States government campaign to train granny midwives, granny midwives were traditionally trained through apprenticeship after being spiritually called to the profession. It was not uncommon for the calling to midwifery to be passed matrilineally from generation to generation or through some other family tradition. In such cases of apprenticeship, the midwife-in-training might serve as apprentice until her mentor retired, though this was not always the case.

State-sponsored training and regulation of midwives took many different forms and existed to varying degrees in numerous states from the 1900s onwards. In Maryland in 1910, there were 23,456 lay midwives, who had in many cases had been practicing for decades, required to be recognized by the state in order to practice. They had to be able to read and write, to attend at least five confinements under supervision, and to demonstrate to the state board of health that they could attend to normal labor. The state also had regulatory measures which required doctors to check in after every midwife-assisted birth so that they could identify and report any infractions made by the midwives.

Eight years later in 1918, Alabama passed a law requiring all midwives currently practicing in the state to register with the state board of health and to pass an elementary examination. In response to this new law, the John A. Andrew Hospital of Tuskegee University organized a training program for midwives in Macon County. The program aimed to prepare Macon County midwives for the examination and to equip them with some basic formalized medical training. The course was four weeks in length and the midwives were given lectures by hospital staff and assigned to observe birth in the hospital setting. Other lessons included bed making, food preparation, and cutting the umbilical cord. Mississippi began a similar program of training and regulation after the 1921 passage of the Sheppard-Towner Maternity and Infancy Protection Act, which provided federal funds for such midwifery training programs. Mississippi's training and regulation program focused on community based large meetings or "clubs" where midwives gathered for instruction by public health nurses. A "lead" or "president" midwife would instruct the group in the case of a nurse absence. These club meetings function as a way of initially training the midwives and then sustaining training and development, as well as places of support.

==== Procedures ====
Granny midwives use a variety of healing techniques and practices. Historically, granny midwives used both herbal and spiritual remedies. Some granny midwives used the phases of the moon to time pregnancies.

Archeologist Laurie A. Wilkie compared the oral histories of granny midwifery tradition with an archeological record in her article "Expelling frogs and binding babies: conception, gestation and birth in nineteenth-century African American midwifery". Wilkie reports that granny midwives had specific procedures for every stage of the maternal process, from pregnancy to delivery to post partum and oral histories of their traditions are confirmed by archeological artifacts from the 19th century. When a woman in a community was pregnant, a granny midwife might have gone and stayed with that woman and her family for weeks or days leading up to her predicted due date. The granny midwife might have helped with the pregnant woman's household chores in addition to caring for the pregnant woman. To prepare for delivery, the granny midwife might have applied lard or Vaseline to an expecting woman's perineum to lessen the likelihood of tearing and ease the passage of the infant.

In her survey of 19th-century granny midwifery practices, scholar Laura Wilkie describes a ritual performed by granny midwives and expecting families during labor known as "fussing". According to Wilkie, fussing occurred during the second stage of labor and involved the midwife and the expecting woman's family and friends entering the birth room and adorning the expecting woman's body and hair with fragrant oils. Fussing involved massaging and encouragement. The fragrances served to relax and encourage the mother in her labor while also warding off bad spirits and binding the coming infant's spirit to the physical world. Binding an infant's spirit to people and things in the physical world was believed to keep the spiritual world from reclaiming the infant's spirit.

Granny midwives had specific protocols for newborn infants. When children were born, granny midwives might place charms on the infant such as silver or copper coins to help bind the infant's spirit to its body. Granny midwives also encouraged breastfeeding after birth, as breast milk would pass the mother's wisdom or "mother wit" to her infant. Breast milk served as an additional spiritual binder for the infant, binding its spirit to the mother's. Another common practice among granny midwives was the coating of infant's skin in lard, tallow, or Vaseline. This not only protected the infant's skin from the elements, but it also prevented meconium from adhering to the infant's skin.

Granny midwives used a range of herbal and other remedies. Emmenagogues, used to stimulate menstrual bleeding and as abortifacients, such as tansy, pennyroyal, senna, cottonseed, cedar berries, juniper, ginger, turpentine, asafetida, and camphor were known to and used by granny midwives. Granny midwives were also known to carry castor oil, black pepper tea, goose grease, and other remedies to stimulate labor and aid in contractions.

After the United States began licensing granny midwives, strict rules where put into place about what granny midwives should carry to treat their patients. Scholar Valerie Lee writes that in Florida, midwives registered with the state were mandated to carry such things as baby scales, safety razors, and silver nitrile solution. However, the midwives supplemented these mandates with their own trusted remedies and tools, such as nail files, aspirin, camphor, Vaseline, and collapsible birthing stools.

== US Midwifery Education, Regulation, and Association ==
The US Midwifery Education, Regulation, and Association (US MERA) is made up of individuals from seven national organizations: North American Registry of Midwives (NARM), Midwifery Education Accreditation Council (MEAC), Midwives Alliance of North America (MANA), National Association of Certified Professional Midwives (NACPM), American Midwifery Certification Board (AMCB), Accreditation Commission for Midwifery Education (ACME) and American College of Nurse Midwives (ACNM). These organizations have worked together since 2011 to "envision and work toward a more cohesive midwifery presence inspired and informed by global midwifery standards and competencies adopted by the International Confederation of Midwives in 2011." An updated report from a 2016 US MERA Leadership Meeting describes their most recent goals, including recommending "a clear strategic direction through 2020 to focus the collaboration's work".

== Statistics ==
California had the highest employment of Midwives, and Massachusetts having only 310 as of May 2020.

State of Employment	How Many are Employed?	Wage
California	1,010	$76.72
Pennsylvania	340	$49.63
New York	490	$60.66
Texas	450	$40.88
Massachusetts	310	$62.19

== See also ==
- Birth attendant
- Childbirth
- Doula
- Mamie Odessa Hale
- Natural childbirth
- CNMs in the United States
- Medical Humanities
- Sheppard–Towner Act
