= Linda McCauley =

American scientist and academic administrator

- Education: University of North Carolina at Chapel Hill (B.S.N.); Emory University (M.S.N.); University of Cincinnati (Ph.D.)
- Scientific career
- Workplaces: University of Cincinnati; Oregon Health & Science University; University of Pennsylvania School of Nursing; Emory University Nell Hodgson Woodruff School of Nursing

Linda A. McCauley is an American scientist and academic administrator. She is dean of the Nell Hodgson Woodruff School of Nursing at Emory University. She was a professor of nursing and associate dean of research at University of Pennsylvania School of Nursing.

== Education ==
McCauley completed a B.S.N. from University of North Carolina at Chapel Hill. She earned a master's in nursing from Emory University. She completed a doctorate in environmental health at University of Cincinnati.

== Career ==
McCauley had an academic appointment at University of Cincinnati. She was a scientist in the Center for Research on Occupational and Environmental Toxicology (CROET) and a professor of nursing in the family and community health division at Oregon Health & Science University. McCauley joined University of Pennsylvania School of Nursing in 2003 as associate dean of research and a professor of nursing. She had administrative responsibilities including the research initiatives and policy making and oversight. She became dean of the Nell Hodgson Woodruff School of Nursing at Emory University in May 2009. McCauley is experienced in nursing education and researches the impact of environmental exposures and health hazards on vulnerable populations such as workers and young children.

== Awards and honors ==
McCauley is a fellow of the American Association of Occupational Health Nurses and the American Academy of Nursing.
