= Nell Hodgson Woodruff School of Nursing =

Private collegel in Atlanta, Georgia, US

- Type: Private
- Established: 1905; 121 years ago
- Dean: Linda McCauley
- Location: Atlanta, Georgia, US; 33°47′23.1″N 84°19′12.75″W
- Campus: Suburban
- Website: nursing.emory.edu

Nell Hodgson Woodruff School of Nursing is the nursing school of Emory University in Atlanta, Georgia. The school awards the Bachelor of Science in Nursing (BSN), Master of Nursing (MN), Master of Science in Nursing (MSN), Doctor of Nursing Practice (DNP), and Doctor of Philosophy in Nursing (PhD). The school is named after Nell Hodgson Woodruff, wife of long-time president of The Coca-Cola Company Robert W. Woodruff. Mrs. Woodruff left nursing school when she married, but she supported nursing causes throughout her life.

U.S. News & World Report has consistently ranked the Nell Hodgson Woodruff School of Nursing 1st in the nation for both its undergraduate and master’s programs, including the 2026-2027 rankings. Two of the school's nursing specialties, pediatrics and midwifery, were highly ranked in U.S. News & World Report's 2012 edition of "America's Best Graduate Schools." The school's pediatric nurse practitioner program made its first appearance in the report at No. 11. The school's midwifery program remains in the U.S. News rankings at number 13.

== Notable alumni ==
- Fatu Kekula, who during the 2014 West African Ebola outbreak used trash bags as protection against the virus and saved 3 out of 4 of her family members, is completing her final year of nursing studies at the School, training in burn care in order to work with children in Liberia who have suffered burns from falling into cooking pits.

== Notable staff ==
- Elizabeth Sharp, nurse and midwife who set up the graduate midwifery training program, the Emory University Nurse-Midwifery Program, at the School of Nursing

== Degree programs ==
Nell Hodgson Woodruff School of Nursing offers degree programs at the Bachelor's, Master's, and Doctoral level.

=== Bachelors level ===
- Bachelor of Science in Nursing (BSN)

=== Masters level ===
- Masters of Nursing (MN)
- Master of Science in Nursing (MSN)
- Master of Science in Nursing (MSN)/ Master of Public Health (MPH)
- Master of Science in Nursing (MSN)/ Master of Arts (MA)

=== Doctoral level ===
- Doctor of Philosophy in Nursing (PhD)
- Doctor of Nursing Practice (DNP)
