= Journal of Midwifery & Women's Health =

- Discipline: Midwifery
- Language: English
- Edited by: Melissa D. Avery

Publication details
- History: 1955-present
- Publisher: John Wiley & Sons on behalf of the American College of Nurse-Midwives
- Frequency: Bimonthly
- Impact factor: 2.388 (2020)

Standard abbreviations
- ISO 4: J. Midwifery Women's Health
- NLM: J Midwifery Womens Health

Indexing
- ISSN: 1526-9523 (print); 1542-2011 (web)
- OCLC no.: 868977248

Links
- Journal homepage

The Journal of Midwifery & Women's Health is a bimonthly peer-reviewed healthcare journal covering midwifery and women's health. It is the official journal of the American College of Nurse-Midwives. It was previously known as Journal of Nurse-Midwifery, and was published by Elsevier.

== See also ==
- Journal of Obstetric, Gynecologic, & Neonatal Nursing
- List of nursing journals
