= Fatu Kekula =

Liberian nurse and Ebola survivor

- Education: Nell Hodgson Woodruff School of Nursing
- Known for: Creating the "trash bag method" for safely caring for Ebola patients outside of hospitals

Fatu Kekula is a Liberian woman who was a nursing student during the Ebola virus epidemic in Liberia. Four of her family members became ill and could not access medical care in a hospital. She improvised a "trash bag method" that would allow her to care for her family members without becoming ill herself. Three of her family members survived the epidemic, and Kekula herself did not contract the virus. The trash bag method has been recognized as a relatively simple and accessible way for people to protect themselves in an epidemic if they cannot get treatment in a hospital.

== Ebola outbreak ==
On 27 July 2014, Fatu Kekula's father, Moses, became ill and was taken to a local hospital in Kakata, Liberia. Unknown to the family, the hospital bed he was given had just been used by someone who died of Ebola. After hospital staff began contracting the disease, the hospital shut down; Kekula attempted to take her father to a hospital in Monrovia, but they were all at capacity. Kekula took him home, where three other family members became ill: Kekula's mother, Victoria, her sister, Vivian, and her cousin, Alfred Winnie.

At the time, she was in her final year of study to become a nurse. Doctors would not come to her house due to the contagion risk, but one did advise Kekula over the phone. Some doctors told her to leave her family and not go "anywhere near them," however, she said that she could not have done this because "your family is your family."

Kekula quarantined her sick family members in a makeshift isolation room—an unfinished room outside the house. She was able to start IV lines to administer drugs she purchased from a local clinic. She also treated them with oral rehydration therapy. Kekula did not have access to standard personal protective equipment from the highly-contagious disease, so to care for her sick family members, she improvised a new method. Her method has been called the "trash bag method." It involved placing trash bags over her socks and tying them off at the calf. She would then put on rubber boots, over which she added another layer of trash bags. She also wrapped her hair in a trash bag. She also wore a raincoat, a surgical mask, and four gloves on each hand. After each bout of caring for her sick family members, she would carefully remove her gear and spray herself with chlorinated water. She would then burn the contaminated equipment. Her weeks of caring for her sick family led her to use four boxes of surgical gloves, as well as several bags of raincoats.

On August 17, Kekula's four family members were taken to a hospital when space became available. Her cousin died the following day, while her mother, father, and sister all recovered. Her success rate (75%) was noted to be much higher than the average success rate in Liberia during the outbreak (30%).

== After the outbreak ==
Kekula received donations from around the world so that she would be able to complete her nursing degree. She was accepted into the Nell Hodgson Woodruff School of Nursing at Emory University in Atlanta, Georgia. An Associate Dean at Emory University stated, "What better place than Emory to train a nurse who will return to the front lines of the fight against Ebola? And what a great opportunity for our current students to be able to study alongside someone who has faced a crisis that threatened her country, her own family and herself? It’s a perfect match." She was particularly interested in learning more about caring for burn injuries, as Liberian children sometimes fall into the open fires used for cooking.

== Impact ==
Workers from international aid organizations learned about Kekula's "trash bag method" and began teaching it to other people in West Africa who did not have the means or ability to make it to a hospital.
