= Boston Association for Childbirth Education =

The Boston Association for Childbirth Education (BACE) was established in 1953 by students of Jean Whiffen. BACE was one of the first American organizations focused on natural childbirth and maternal-based obstetrical care, and in 1962, it sponsored the first breastfeeding support group in New England.

BACE's founders were influenced by Grantly Dick-Read's ideas about natural childbirth. During the first five years of its existence, BACE organized small group meetings in individual women's homes. These were focused on teaching prospective parents about pregnancy, labor and delivery, breastfeeding, and other topics in order to encourage natural childbirth. In the 1960s, BACE began to incorporate trainings encouraging father-centered birth coaching.

Nurse Justine Kelliher (b. 1920) was one of the first instructors. Many women who BACE trained as lay breastfeeding instructors and supporters as part of the Nursing Mother's Council also later served as leaders for La Leche League International, an international nonprofit organization that distributes information on and promotes breastfeeding.

In 1960, BACE was one of the organizations represented at the founding convention of the International Childbirth Education Association (ICEA).

BACE currently provides training and certification to become a childbirth educator.
