= Childbirth Connection =

American nonprofit organization

Childbirth Connection, formerly known as the Maternity Center Association, is an American national nonprofit organization that works to improve the quality of maternity care through research, education, advocacy, and policy. Childbirth Connection promotes safe, effective evidence-based maternity care and is a voice for the interests of childbearing women and families.

== Founding ==
The Maternity Center Association (MCA) was founded in 1918 in New York City. That year, Frances Perkins became the group's executive secretary. The organization grew out of an effort by the Women's City Club of New York City, an organization of 2000 influential women, to reduce the extreme maternal and infant mortality rates in New York City and the United States at that time. A New York City commission recommended the establishment of maternity centers, and the Women's City Club of New York responded by creating the Maternity Center Association, which ran a center for medical and nursing care.

== Growth and opposition ==
By the 1920s, the organization was running thirty neighborhood centers throughout New York City. It soon concluded that midwives were not sufficiently well prepared. The group refocused its efforts on a single demonstration center, and worked to establish a training program or school for nurse-midwifery.

These efforts ran into opposition from some physicians, several of whom resigned from the group's board. But in 1931, in an effort spearheaded by Mary Breckinridge, the group created the first school of nurse-midwifery in the United States. The curriculum was based on the British nurse-midwifery curriculum. The school achieved significant improvements in midwifery care. From 1932 to 1958, the school's years of operation, its graduates attended 7099 births, most of them in the mother's home; the maternal death rate was 0.9 per 1000 live births, more than 10 times better than the national average during this period of 10.4 per 1000 live births. The MCA promoted its care and education ideas through a handbook, conferences, and institutes.

== Birth centers ==
In 1975, concerned about "do-it-yourself" home births, the Association created the first urban birth center, in a modified townhouse in downtown Manhattan, for women to give birth outside hospitals. Nurse-midwives provided most of the care at the center. The center was integrated into the existing health care system, although costs were far lower than at a hospital. The MCA helped develop a quality assurance system for out-of-hospital birth centers, and offered its center as a prototype. The group's efforts led to an association now known as the American Association of Birth Centers.

The group received funding through New York charity events; Brooke Astor was a board member.

== Public health education and outreach ==
The Association sponsored popular educational exhibitions at the 1933 World's Fair in Chicago, and the 1939-1940 New York World's Fair. The latter exhibit included the Dickinson-Belskie Birth Series of life-size cross-section medical models showing the progression of pregnancy and birth. The models were originally sculpted by Abram Belskie under the supervision of doctor Robert Latou Dickinson. The originals and authorized copies were soon exhibited at many locations throughout the US and the world.

The Association also published an affordable Birth Atlas series of books based on the exhibit, which sold widely across the US and internationally. In the 1940s, the Association was working on a Spanish-language version of its book. It also sold copies to UNICEF.

== Change in purpose ==
Starting in the 1990s, the group moved away from providing direct services and instead expanded its policy research agenda and its public education and outreach programs. The group transferred ownership of its main childbirth center to St. Vincent's Hospital in New York City in 1996. In 2005, the group changed its name to Childbirth Connection, and adopted the tagline "helping women and health professionals make informed maternity care decisions." In 2006, its education website, www.childbirthconnection.org, won a World Wide Web Health Award in the "Patient Education Information" category. The group continues to sponsor conferences and research programs to improve maternity care in the United States.

The group has never taken any position on abortion, because it "deals exclusively with women who want to carry their pregnancies to term."

== See also ==
- The New York Foundation
