= Nurse midwife =

Health professional

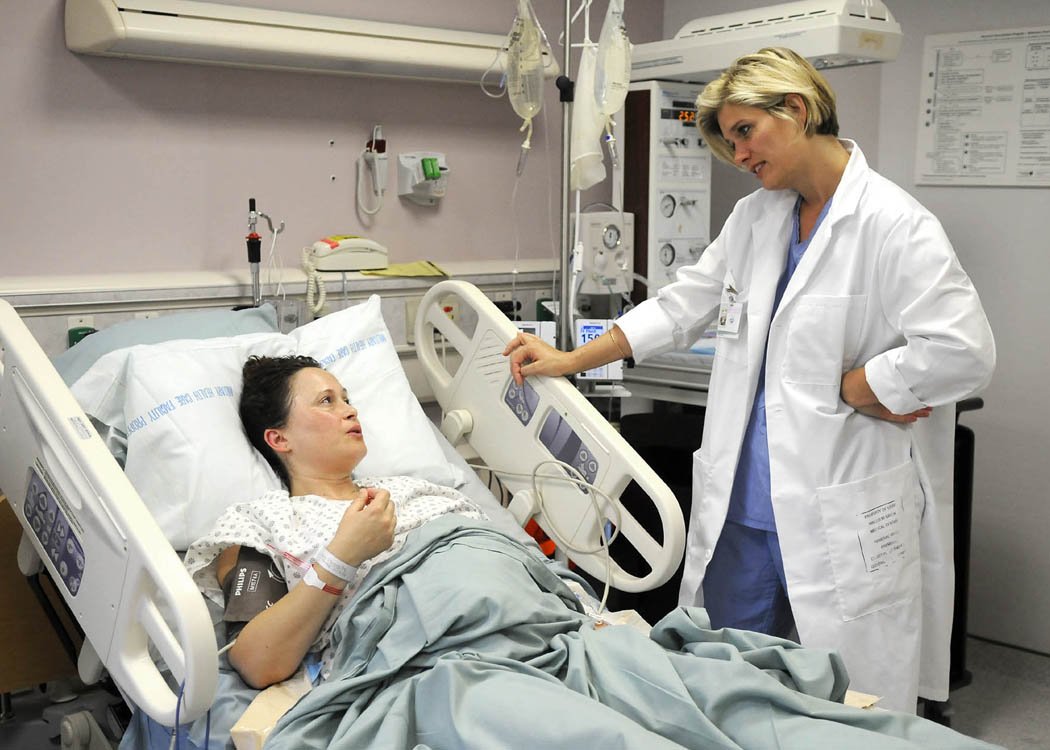
- US Navy CNM checks on a mother

Occupation
- Occupation type: Professional
- Activity sectors: Nursing

Description
- Education required: Master of Science in Nursing; Doctor of Nursing Practice
- Fields of employment: Hospitals

A nurse midwife is both a nurse (usually a registered nurse) and a midwife, having completed nursing and midwifery education leading to practice as a nurse midwife and sometimes credentialed in the specialty. Nurse midwives provide care of women across the lifespan, including during pregnancy and the postpartum period, and well woman care and birth control.

== Practice ==
Nurse midwives can function as primary healthcare providers for women and most often provide medical care for relatively healthy women, whose health and births are considered uncomplicated rather than high risk, as well as their neonates. Women with high risk pregnancies can often receive the benefits of midwifery care from a nurse midwife in collaboration with a physician. The nurse midwife may work closely or in collaboration with an obstetrician & gynecologist, who provides consultation and assistance to patients who develop complications or have complex medical histories or disease(s). They provide health care for sexual health, as they also see women for routine exams and are able to initiate all types of contraception.

Nurse midwives practice in hospitals and private practice medical clinics and may also deliver babies in birthing centers and attend at-home births. Some work with academic institutions as professors. They are able to prescribe medications, treatments, medical devices, therapeutic and diagnostic measures. They are also able to provide medical care to women from puberty through menopause, including care for their newborn (neonatology), antepartum, intrapartum, postpartum and nonsurgical gynecological care. In some cases, nurse midwives may also provide care to the male partner of their female patient in areas of sexually transmitted diseases and reproductive health. In the United States, less than one percent of nurse midwives are men.

== See also ==
- Mary Breckinridge, Founder of Frontier Nursing Service
- Certified Nurse‐Midwife (United States)
- Childbirth
- Doula
- Nurse practitioner
- Obstetrical nursing
