= Birthing center =

Healthcare facility where pregnant mothers can give birth

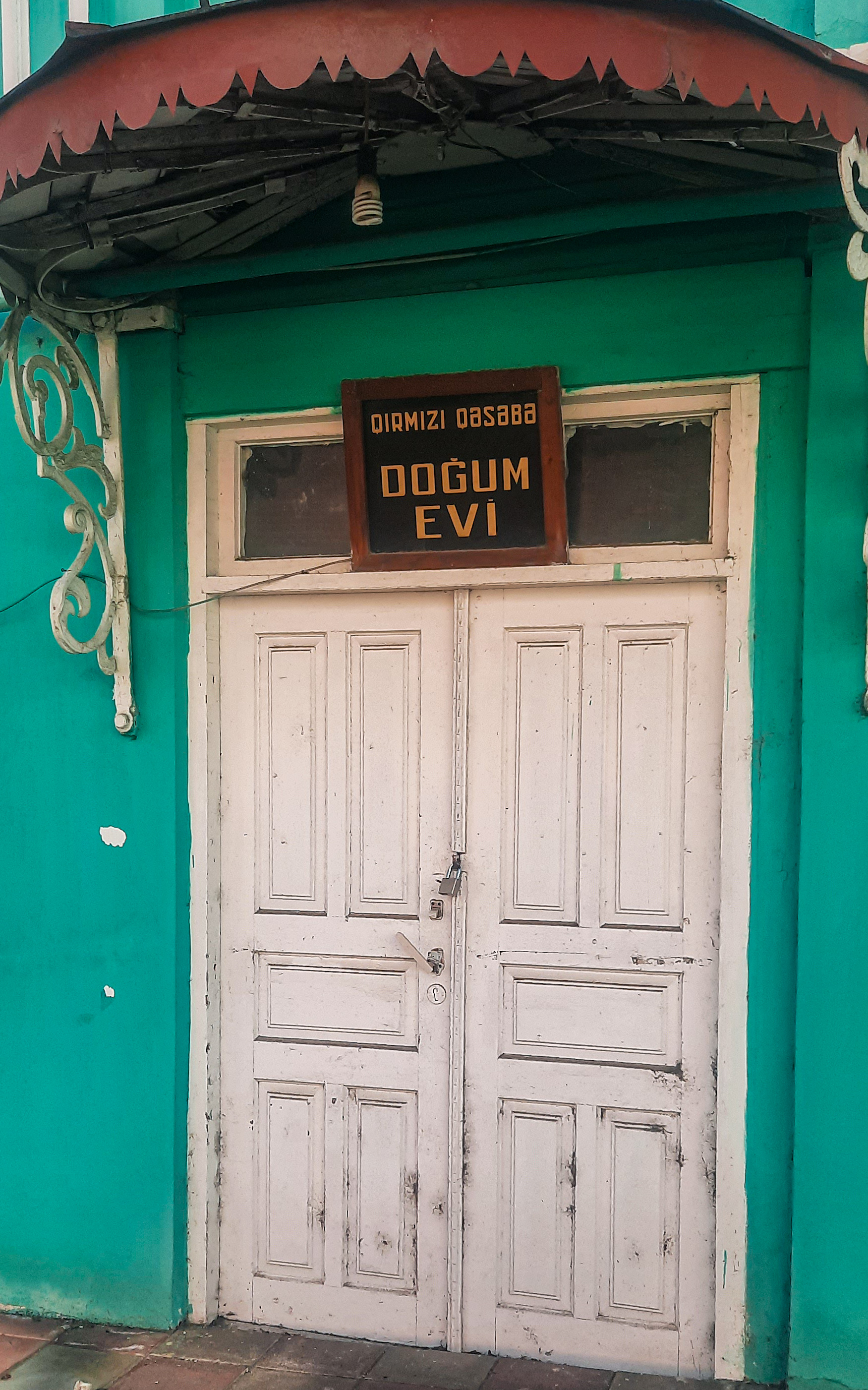
A birthing center in Qırmızı Qəsəbə, Azerbaijan

A birthing center is a healthcare facility, staffed by nurse midwives, midwives and/or obstetricians, for mothers in labor, who may be assisted by doulas and coaches. The midwives monitor the labor, and well-being of the mother and the baby during birth. Doulas can assist the midwives and make the birth easier. Should additional medical assistance be required, the mother can be transferred to a hospital.

A birth center presents a more home-like environment than a hospital labor ward, typically with more options during labor: food and drink, music, and the attendance of family and friends if desired. Other characteristics can also include non-institutional furniture such as queen-sized beds, large enough for both mother and father, and perhaps birthing tubs or showers for water births, an option that can help to reduce birthing pains. These centers also offer opioid injections (Pethidine) and Entonox gas as a way to help alleviate pain. The decor is meant to emphasize the normality of birth. In a birth center, women are free to act more spontaneously during their birth, such as squatting, walking or performing other postures that assist in labor. Active birth is encouraged.

== Comparison of traditional vs. alternative ==
A 2012 Cochrane review compared traditional hospital births with alternative, home-like settings in or near conventional hospital labor wards. In comparison with traditional hospital wards, home-like settings had a trend towards an increase in spontaneous vaginal birth, continued breastfeeding at six to eight weeks, and a positive view of care. The review also found that having a birth at an alternative birth center decreased the likelihood of medical intervention during labor, without increasing risk to mother or child. The likelihood of risks during a pregnancy or a mother's preexisting medical conditions may impact the ability for that mother to use a birthing center.

== Around the world ==
=== United States ===
Like clinics, birth centers arose on the East and West Coasts in the 1970s, as alternatives to heavily institutionalized health care. Today, use of birthing centers is generally covered by health insurance. Several of the practices which were innovated in birth centers are beginning to enter the mainstream hospital labor and delivery floors, including:

- Bathtubs or whirlpools for labor and/or birthing
- Showers for mothers to labor in
- Hospital acceptance of the mother choosing to walk during labor, use a labor/birthing ball, not use pain medication during labor
- rooming in of the infant after birth
- Beds for family members to stay with the mother during labor and birth

There are more favourable cases where giving birth at a birth center would be ideal. First, the mother may have a low-risk, healthy pregnancy, are pregnant with one baby (i.e. not twins), and that the baby is positioned head down (cephalic presentation).

Free-standing birth centers require hospital backup in case complications arise during labor that require more complex care. However, even if a delivery cannot happen at the birth center due to a high-risk pregnancy, birth center midwives might provide prenatal care up to a certain week of gestation.

There also exists birthing centers inside of hospitals. In these centers, doctors are very accessible in the case of emergencies.

==== Accreditation ====
The nationwide organization supporting and promoting birth centers is the American Association of Birth Centers (AABC). Many birth centers nationwide, like hospitals, chose to become accredited through the Commission for the Accreditation of Birth Centers (CABC). Since 1985, CABC has provided this accreditation service, as well as education and support to birth centers and alongside maternity centers. Some birth centers are required to obtain accreditation in order to apply for state licensure, or to become in-network with certain insurance plans. Many birth centers chose voluntarily to undergo accreditation to demonstrate their commitment to safety and continuous quality improvement.

Accreditation depends on a set of measures, called indicators, against which birth centers are evaluated during site visits by CABC Accreditation Specialists. Adherence to these indicators ensures both safety of mother and infant as well as protects the integrity of the birth center model of care as distinct from hospital care. For example, while continuous fetal monitoring is typical in hospital labor and delivery units, intermittent monitoring with a handheld electronic device is used in birth centers to protect the birthing woman's freedom of mobility during her labor and birth. CABC Indicators also require a birth center to have a written plan for how to proceed with transfer to a hospital in the event of an emergency that cannot be managed at the birth center.

Birth center applications for accreditation are reviewed by Commissioners on the board of trustees of the CABC. These Commissioners are Certified Nurse‐Midwives, certified professional midwives, physician specialists in obstetrics and neonatology, nurses, and birth center consumers. The Commissioners meet quarterly to review items of concern relevant to birth center education and development and publish a monthly newsletter for CABC-accredited birth centers for continuing education. The CABC works with policy advocacy organizations to advance and promote birth centers and the midwifery model of care. While CABC works closely alongside the AABC, the organizations are separate and have distinctly separate roles regarding national standards and accreditation of birth centers. CABC is the only accrediting body devoted exclusively to birth centers, whose site visitors are specifically trained to conduct a site visit in a birth center; and whose review panels have first‐hand knowledge of the philosophy, clinical care and operation of birth centers. AABC on the other hand, is a membership and trade organization for established and developing birth centers and other individuals, agencies and institutions that support the birth center model of care and the national AABC Standards for Birth Centers.

==== Amish centers ====
The Amish, known for their great respect for tradition, usually have homebirths or give birth at birthing centers. Most Amish women only go to a hospital to give birth when there is a known medical risk for her or the child, but some Amish women choose to go the hospital during labor for peace of mind. Two books have been written about Amish medical issues including their birthing practices: Dr. Frau: A Woman Doctor among the Amish by Grace Kaiser and House calls and hitching posts: stories from Dr. Elton Lehman's career among the Amish by Elton Lehman. Lehman is known for his work in founding a freestanding Amish birthing center. The Mount Eaton Care Center, Ohio's first such center, was established in 1984. In her book, Kaiser recounts the private nature of birthing among the Amish. She points out the practice of Amish women keeping labor a secret to all except their own husbands and midwife or obstetrician, as well as the practice of women waiting until active labor before summoning a midwife or OB. Due to the latter practice, fathers occasionally end up delivering their own children before the midwife or OB can arrive if a homebirth is selected. Amish women who choose a home birth often continue with household duties until they are no longer physically able to continue. If birthing in a birth center, they are free to labor similar to that of home births: eating, drinking, visiting with their family members, etc.

=== Australia ===
In a response to the National Maternity Action Plan, State and Territory Governments in 2002 started to respond to consumer demand for an increased number of birth centers to be made available to women. Whilst most birth centers are attached to hospitals, some are being established as free-standing centers much further away from hospital back-up. As long as they are within 90 minutes of a hospital, they are considered safe. Most birth centers are now being run solely by midwives, with obstetric back-up only used when there are complications.

Some birth centers in Australia are moving away from the 'low-risk' model and are moving to an All-risk model where women with medical complications are accepted into the birth center but extra care is provided to them where necessary.

=== Canada ===
Birthing centers remain controversial. Hospitals do offer this option, and it is available at special clinics.

=== Netherlands ===
The Netherlands has seen a growth in the number of locations for giving birth, other than homebirth or hospital maternity wards. In these facilities the birth is overseen by a midwife, typically in a homelike environment. Most community midwives work in group practices and only refer patients to hospital obstetric units for labor complications. Certification requires a four-year education at a midwifery academy.

=== Nepal ===
A three-year study focusing on the remote Solukhumbu District explored access to perinatal care and found that 36% of deliveries took place in a health facility. Results from this study noted that access to timely transportation options were a major factor in the lack of accessibility for maternal delivery support.

== See also ==
- Natural childbirth
- Midwifery
- Pregnancy
