= Home birth =

Childbirth in a non-clinical setting

A home birth is a birth that takes place in a residence rather than in a hospital or a birthing center. They may be attended by a midwife, or lay attendant with experience in managing home births. Home birth was, until the advent of modern medicine, the standard method of delivery in the vast majority of births. The term was coined in the middle of the 19th century as births began to take place in hospitals.

Multiple studies have been performed concerning the safety of home births for both the child and the mother. Standard practices, licensing requirements and access to emergency hospital care differ between regions making it difficult to compare studies across national borders. A 2014 US survey of medical studies found that perinatal mortality rates were triple that of hospital births, and a US nationwide study of over 13 million births on a 3-year span (2007–2010) found that births at home were roughly 10 times as likely to be stillborn (14 times in first-born babies) and almost four times as likely to have neonatal seizures or serious neurological dysfunction when compared to babies born in hospitals. Alternatively, there is research coming out that suggests that there is actually no significant difference in perinatal mortality rates between home and hospital birth and some even suggest that there are benefits such as less complications and fewer interventions. Higher maternal and infant mortality rates are associated with the inability to offer timely assistance to mothers with emergency procedures in case of complications during labour, as well as with widely varying licensing and training standards for birth attendants between different states and countries.

== Etymology ==
The word combination "home birth" arose some time in the middle of the 19th century and coincided with the rise of births that took place in lying-in hospitals. Since women around the world left homes to give birth in clinics and hospitals as the 20th century progressed, the term "home birth" came to refer to giving birth, intentionally or otherwise, in a residence as opposed to a hospital.

== History and philosophy ==
Although the fact humans give birth is universal, the social nature of birth is not. Where, with whom, how, and when someone gives birth is socially and culturally determined. Historically, birth has been a social event. For the most of humankind history of birth is equivalent to history of home birth. The hypothesis exists that birth was transformed from a solitary to social event early in human evolution. Traditionally and historically, other women assisted women in childbirth. A special term evolved in the English language around 1300 to name women who made assistance in childbirth their vocation – midwife, literally meaning "with woman". However, midwife was a description of a social role of a woman who was "with woman" in childbirth to mediate social arrangements for woman's bodily experience of birth.

== Birthing on country ==
Birthing on country is a traditional birthing practice that constitutes giving birth on the land where the mother was born as well as her ancestors. It is a culturally appropriate practice that coincides with spiritual tradition. It offers support to women and their families by continuing the birthing process in the community among the women and children. It is largely practiced by aboriginal women, in countries such as Australia, Canada, New Zealand and the United States. The belief is that if a child is not born on country they lose their connection to the land and their community.

Birthing on country can happen in rural areas as well as birthing in cities.

=== In the United States ===
There was an increase in the percentage of home births from 2004 to 2009. Since 2009, Montana had the largest increase when it comes to home births with a percentage of 2.55 percent. Oregon and Vermont was close together when it comes to home births with percentages of 1.96 percent and 1.91 percent. The other five additional states which are Idaho, Pennsylvania, Utah, Washington, and Wisconsin, they all had an increase of home births with a percent of 1.50 and above.

When it comes to the Southeastern states which are Texas, North Carolina, Connecticut, Delaware, the District of Columbia, Illinois, Massachusetts, Nebraska, New Jersey, Rhode Island, South Dakota, and West Virginia, they all experienced a lower percentage of home births with only a percentage of 0.50 percent.

Since the percentage of home birth increased from 2004 to 2009, it went to widespread which involved states regions, and countries. While two areas saw significant decreases, 31 states saw rapid increases when it comes to home births.

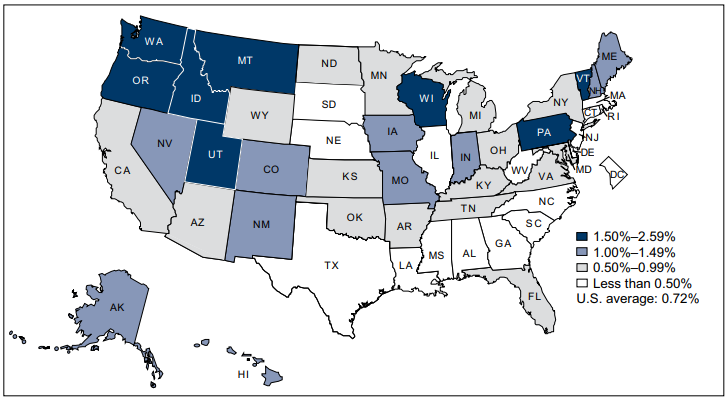
Homebirth State Data 2009 Map

=== In Australia ===
In the Northern Territory of Australia, the prescribed steps advocated by the government is that, in rural areas, a woman at 37 weeks gestation must leave "country" and fly to the nearest city. If an adult, she flies alone with no family members. She will wait in accommodations until she goes into labour. After birth she and the baby are flown back to "country".

== Types ==
Home births are either attended or unattended, planned or unplanned. Women are attended when they are assisted through labor and birth by a professional, usually a midwife, and rarely a general practitioner. Women who are unassisted or only attended by a lay person, perhaps a doula, their spouse, family, friend, or a non-professional birth attendant, are sometimes called freebirths. A "planned" home birth is a birth that occurs at home by intention. An "unplanned" home birth is one that occurs at home by necessity but not with intention. Reasons for unplanned home births include inability to travel to the hospital or birthing center due to conditions outside the control of the mother such as weather or road blockages or speed of birth progression.

=== Factors ===
Many women choose home birth because delivering a baby in familiar surroundings is important to them. Others choose home birth because they dislike a hospital or birthing center environment, do not like a medically centered birthing experience, are concerned about exposing the infant to hospital-borne pathogens, or dislike the presence of strangers at the birth. Others prefer home birth because they feel it is more natural and less stressful. In a study published in the Journal of Midwifery and Women's Health, women were asked why they chose a home birth; the top five reasons given were safety, avoidance of unnecessary medical interventions common in hospital births, previous negative hospital experiences, more control, and a comfortable and familiar environment. One study found that women experience pain inherent in birth differently, and less negatively, in a home setting.

Cost is also a factor. The estimated average cost of a home birth in the United States in 2021 was $4,650, compared with $13,562 for a vaginal hospital birth. In developing countries, where women may not be able to afford medical care or it may not be accessible to them, a home birth may be the only option available, and the woman may or may not be assisted by a professional attendant of any kind.

Some women may not be able to have a safe birth at home, even with highly trained midwives. There are some medical conditions that can prevent a woman from qualifying for a home birth. These often include heart disease, renal disease, diabetes, preeclampsia, placenta previa, placenta abruption, antepartum hemorrhage after 20 weeks gestation, and active genital herpes. Prior caesarean deliveries can sometimes prevent a woman from qualifying for a home birth, though not always. It is important that a woman and her health care provider discuss the individual health risks prior to planning a home birth.

== Trends ==
Home birth was, until the advent of modern medicine, the de facto method of delivery. In many developed countries, home birth declined rapidly over the 20th century. In the United States there was a large shift towards hospital births beginning around 1900, when close to 100% of births were at home. Rates of home births fell to 50% in 1938 and to fewer than 1% in 1955. However, between 2004 and 2009, the number of home births in the United States rose by 41%. In the United Kingdom a similar but slower trend happened with approximately 80% of births occurring at home in the 1920s and only 1% in 1991. In Japan the change in birth location happened much later, but much faster: home birth was at 95% in 1950, but only 1.2% in 1975. In countries such as the Netherlands, where home births have been a regular part of the maternity system, the rate for home births is 20% in 2014. Over a similar time period, maternal mortality during childbirth fell during 1900 to 1997 from 6–9 deaths per thousand to 0.077 deaths per thousand, while the infant mortality rate dropped between 1915 and 1997 from around 100 deaths per thousand births to 7.2 deaths per thousand.

One doctor described birth in a working-class home in the 1920s:

You find a bed that has been slept on by the husband, wife and one or two children; it has frequently been soaked with urine, the sheets are dirty, and the patient's garments are soiled, she has not had a bath. Instead of sterile dressings you have a few old rags or the discharges are allowed to soak into a nightdress which is not changed for days.

This experience is contrasted with a 1920s hospital birth by Adolf Weber:

The mother lies in a well-aired disinfected room, light and sunlight stream unhindered through a high window and you can make it light as day electrically too. She is well bathed and freshly clothed on linen sheets of blinding whiteness... You have a staff of assistants who respond to every signal... Only those who have to repair a perineum in a cottar's house in a cottar's bed with the poor light and help at hand can realize the joy.

Midwifery, the practice supporting a natural approach to birth, enjoyed a revival in the United States during the 1970s. Ina May Gaskin, for example, sometimes called "the mother of authentic midwifery" helped open The Farm Midwifery Center in Summertown, Tennessee, in 1971, which is still in operation. A movement termed 'pushing for midwives' intensified during the 1990s and early 2000s in the United States, when the public organized to request legislation that would formally legalize midwifery a consumable service. However, although there was a steep increase in midwife-attended births between 1975 and 2002 (from less than 1.0% to 8.1%), most of these births occurred in the hospital. The US rate of out-of-hospital birth has remained steady at 1% of all births since 1989, with data from 2007 showing that 27.3% of the home births since 1989 took place in a free-standing birth center and 65.4% in a residence. Hence, the actual rate of home birth in the United States remained low (0.65%) over the twenty years prior to 2007.

Home birth in the United Kingdom has also received some press since 2000. There was a movement, most notably in Wales, to increase home birth rates to 10% by 2007. Between 2005 and 2006, there was an increase of 16% of home birth rates in Wales, but by 2007 the total home birth rate was still 3% even in Wales (double the national rate). A 2001 report noted that there was a wide range of home birth rates in the UK, with some regions around 1% and others over 20%. In Australia, birth at home has fallen steadily over the years and was 0.3% as of 2008, ranging from nearly 1% in the Northern Territory to 0.1% in Queensland. In 2004, the New Zealand rate for births at home was nearly three times Australia's with a rate of 2.5% and increasing.

In the Netherlands, the trend has been somewhat different from other industrialized countries: while in 1965, two-thirds of Dutch births took place at home, that figure has dropped to about 20% in 2013, which is still more than in other industrialized countries. Less than 1% of South Korean infants are born at home.

== Research on safety ==
In 2019, a meta-analysis examined perinatal and neonatal mortality of planned home birth among low-risk women in well-resourced countries, with research eligible for inclusion encompassing approximately 500,000 intended home births. The study concluded that the risk of perinatal or neonatal mortality was not different whether birth was intended at home or in hospital.

In 2014, a comprehensive review in the Journal of Medical Ethics of 12 previously published studies encompassing 500,000 planned home births in low-risk women found that neonatal mortality rates for home births were triple those of hospital births. This finding echoes that of the American College of Obstetricians and Gynecologists. Due to a greater risk of perinatal death, the college advises women who are post-term (greater than 42 weeks gestation), carrying twins, or have a breech presentation, not to attempt home birth. The Journal of Medical Ethics review additionally found that several studies concluded that home births had a higher likelihood of failing Apgar scores in newborns, as well as a delay in diagnosing hypoxia, acidosis and asphyxia.

That finding contradicts a 2007 UK review study by the National Institute for Health and Clinical Excellence (NICE), a British governmental organization devoted to creating guidelines for coverage throughout the UK, which expressed concern for the lack of quality evidence in studies comparing the potential risks and benefits of home and hospital birthing environments in the UK. Their report noted that intrapartum-related perinatal mortality was low in all settings in the UK, but that in cases of unanticipated obstetric complications, the mortality rate was higher for home births due to the time needed to transfer the mother to an obstetric unit.

The uncertain evidence suggests intrapartum-related perinatal mortality (IPPM) for booked home births, regardless of their eventual place of birth, is the same as, or higher than for birth booked in obstetric units. If IPPM is higher, this is likely to be in the group of women in whom intrapartum complications develop and who require transfer into the obstetric unit. When unanticipated obstetric complications arise, either in the mother or baby, during labour at home, the outcome of serious complications is likely to be less favourable than when the same complications arise in an obstetric unit.

A 2002 study of planned home births in the state of Washington found that home births had shorter labors than hospital births. In North America, a 2005 study found that about 12 percent of women intending to give birth at home needed to be transferred to the hospital for reasons such as a difficult labor or pain relief. A 2014 survey of American home births between 2004 and 2010 found the percent of women transferred to a hospital from a planned home birth after beginning labor to be 10.9%.

Both the Journal of Medical Ethics and the NICE report noted that the use of caesarean sections was lower for women who give birth at home, and both noted a prior study which determined that women who had a planned home birth had greater satisfaction from the experience when compared with women who had a planned birth in a hospital.

In 2009 a study of 500,000 low-risk planned home and hospital births in the Netherlands, where midwives have a strong licensing requirement, was reported in the British Journal of Obstetrics and Gynaecology. The study concluded that for low-risk women there was no increase in perinatal mortality, provided that the midwives were well-trained and that there was easy and quick access to hospitals. Further, the study noted that there was evidence that "low risk women with a planned home birth are less likely to experience referral to secondary care and subsequent obstetric interventions than those with a planned hospital birth." The study has been criticised on several grounds, including that some data might be missing and that the findings may not be representative of other populations.

In 2012, Oregon performed a study of all births in the state during the year as a part of discussing a bill regarding licensing requirements for midwives in the state. They found that the rate of intrapartum infant mortality was 0.6 deaths per thousand births for planned hospital births, and 4.8 deaths per thousand for planned home births. They further found that the death rate for planned home births attended by direct-entry midwives was 5.6 per thousand. The study noted that the statistics for Oregon were different for other areas, such as British Columbia, which had different licensing requirements. Oregon was noted by the Centers for Disease Control and Prevention as having the second-highest rate of home births in the nation in 2009, at 1.96% compared to the national average of 0.72%. A 2014 survey of nearly 17,000 voluntarily reported home births in the United States between 2004 and 2010 found an intrapartum infant mortality rate of 1.30 per thousand; early neonatal and late neonatal mortality rates were a further 0.41 and 0.35 per thousand. The survey excluded congenital anomaly-related deaths, as well as births where the mother was transferred to a hospital prior to beginning labor.

In October 2013 the largest study of this kind was published in the American Journal of Obstetrics and Gynecology and included data on more than 13 million births in the United States, assessing deliveries by physicians and midwives in and out of the hospital from 2007 to 2010. The study indicated that babies born at home are roughly 10 times as likely to have an Apgar score of 0 after 5 minutes and almost four times as likely to have neonatal seizures or serious neurological dysfunction when compared to babies born in hospitals. The study findings showed that the risk of Apgar scores of 0 is even greater in first-born babies—14 times the risk of hospital births. The study results were confirmed by analyzing birth certificate files from the U.S. Centers for Disease Control and Prevention (CDC) and the National Center for Health Statistics. Given the study's findings, Dr. Amos Grunebaum, professor of clinical obstetrics and gynecology at Weill Cornell Medical College and lead author of the study, stated that the magnitude of risk associated with home delivery is so alarming that necessitates the need for the parents-to-be to know the risk factors. Another author, Dr. Frank Chervenak, added that the study underplayed the risks of home births, as the data used counted home births where the mother was transferred to a hospital during labor as a hospital birth.

When it comes to home births vs hospital births, home births are strongly associated with worse outcomes. The increased rate of adverse outcomes of home births exists despite the reported lower risk profile of home birth. [...] We emphasize that the increased risks of poor outcomes from the setting of home birth, regardless of attendant, are virtually impossible to solve by transport. This is because total time for transport from home to hospital cannot realistically be reduced to clinically satisfactory times to optimize outcome when time is of the essence when unexpected deterioration of the condition of either the fetal patient or pregnant patient occurs.

A 2022 study, which examined the introduction of maternity wards in Sweden, found that the wards substantially reduced home deliveries and early neonatal mortality, as well as positive long-term effects on labour income, unemployment, health-related disability and schooling for individuals born in maternity wards.

=== Study design ===
Randomized controlled trials are the "gold standard" of research methodology with respect to applying findings to populations; however, such a study design is not feasible or ethical for location of birth. The studies that do exist, therefore, are cohort studies conducted retrospectively by selecting hospital records and midwife records. by matched pairs (by pairing study participants based on their background characteristics), In February 2011 the American Congress of Obstetricians and Gynecologists identified several factors that make quality research on home birth difficult. These include "lack of randomization; reliance on birth certificate data with inherent ascertainment problems; ascertainment of relying on voluntary submission of data or self-reporting; a limited ability to distinguish between planned and unplanned birth; variation in the skill, training, and certification of the birth attendant; and an inability to account for and accurately attribute adverse outcomes associated with transfers". Quality studies, therefore, need to take steps in their design to mitigate these problems in order to produce meaningful results.

The data available on the safety of home birth in developed countries is often difficult to interpret due to issues such as differing home-birth standards between different countries, and difficult to compare with other studies because of varying definitions of perinatal mortality. Additionally, it is difficult to compare home and hospital births because only the risk profiles are different between the two groups, according to the CDC: people who choose to give birth at home are more likely to be healthy and at low risk for complications. There are also unquantifiable differences in home birth patients, such as maternal attitudes towards medical involvement in birth.

== Methods of scientific inquiry ==
Modern scientific inquiry into home birth takes place in the fields of anthropology, epistemology, ethnology, history, jurisprudence, medicine, midwifery, public health, sociology, and women's studies. Research of home birth is complicated by ancient and modern biases about the nature of women and birth, manifested in the language and ideas that are used to refer to women, women's bodies, and what women do. It has been demonstrated that reports of research of physiological phenomena, such as conception, transmit deep-seated biased cultural notions of women and women's bodies. Most 20th- and 21st-century researchers of home birth view the phenomenon through two broad perspectives that are closely tied to the ideas and perceptions of birth itself – social and biomedical.

== Insurance and licensing issues ==
While a woman in developed countries may choose to deliver her child at home, in a birthing center, or at hospital, health coverage and legal issues influence available options.

=== Australia ===
In April 2007, the Western Australian Government expanded coverage for birth at home across the State. Other state governments in Australia, including the Northern Territory, New South Wales and South Australia, also provide government funding for independent, private home birth.

The 2009 Federal Budget provided additional funds to Medicare to allow more midwives to work as private practitioners, allow midwives to prescribe medication under the Medicare Benefits Schedule, and assist them with medical indemnity insurance. However, this plan only covers hospital births. There are no current plans to extend Medicare and PBS funding to home birth services in Australia.

As of July 2012, all health professionals must show proof of liability insurance.

In March 2016, the Coroners Court of Victoria found against midwife Gaye Demanuel in the case of the death of Caroline Lovell. "Coroner White also called for a review of the regulation of midwives caring for women during home births, and for the government and health authorities to consider an offence banning unregistered health practitioners from taking money for attending home births."

=== Canada ===
Public health coverage of home birth services varies in Canada from province to province, as does the availability of doctors and midwives providing home birth services. The Provinces of Ontario, British Columbia, Saskatchewan, Manitoba, Alberta, and Quebec currently cover home birth services.

=== United Kingdom ===
There are few legal issues with a home birth in the UK. Woman cannot be forced to go to a hospital. The support of the various Health Authorities of the National Health Service may vary, but in general the NHS will cover home births – the Parliamentary Under-Secretary of State for Health, Lord Hunt of King's Heath has stated that "As I understand it, although the NHS has a legal duty to provide a maternity service, there is not a similar legal duty to provide a home birth service to every woman who requests one. However, I certainly hope that when a woman wants a home birth, and it is clinically appropriate, the NHS will do all it can to support that woman in her choice of a home birth."

=== United States ===
Practicing as a direct-entry midwife was illegal in states shown here in red in 2006

27 states license or regulate in some manner direct-entry midwife, or certified professional midwife (CPM). In the other 23 states there are no licensing laws, and practicing midwives can be arrested for practicing medicine without a license. It is legal in all 50 states to hire a certified nurse midwife, or CNM, who are trained nurses, though most CNMs work in hospitals.
