= American College of Nurse-Midwives =

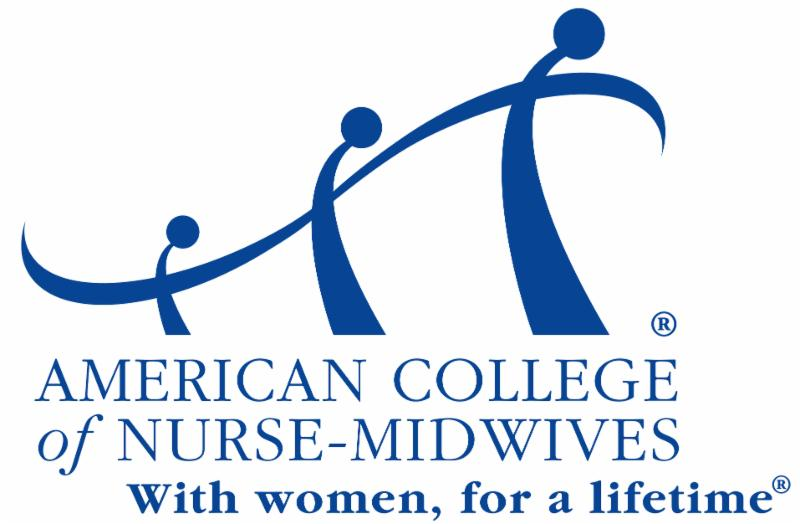
- Abbreviation: ACNM
- Formation: November 7, 1955; 70 years ago
- Type: Professional organization
- Legal status: Active
- Purpose: Membership, Educational, Advocacy
- Headquarters: Washington, DC
- Region served: United States
- President: Jessica Brumley
- CEO: Michelle Munroe
- Website: www.midwife.org

The American College of Nurse-Midwives (ACNM) is a professional association in the United States, formed in 1955, that represents certified nurse-midwives (CNMs) and certified midwives (CMs). Members are primary care providers for women throughout the lifespan, with a special emphasis on pregnancy, childbirth, and gynecologic and reproductive health.

ACNM reviews research, administers and promotes continuing education programs, and works with organizations, state and federal agencies, and members of Congress to advance the well-being of women and infants through the practice of midwifery.

ACNM publishes the Journal of Midwifery & Women's Health.

== History ==
Dating back to 1929, ACNM strives to be a leading example for excellence in midwifery education and practice in the United States and has a special interest in promoting global health in developing countries. The organization was founded in 1955.

The A.C.N.M. Foundation, Inc. (‘the Foundation’) is a 501 (c)(3) charitable organization, incorporated in New York in 1967 with a mission to promote excellent health outcomes for all people and communities. The mission is accomplished in many ways, that includes support to midwives and student midwives:"

== Notable presidents ==
- Elizabeth Sharp, 1973-75

== See also ==
- Childbirth
- Doula
- Nurse practitioner
- Nursing
- Obstetrical nursing
- Midwife
