= International Confederation of Midwives =

Midwivery organization

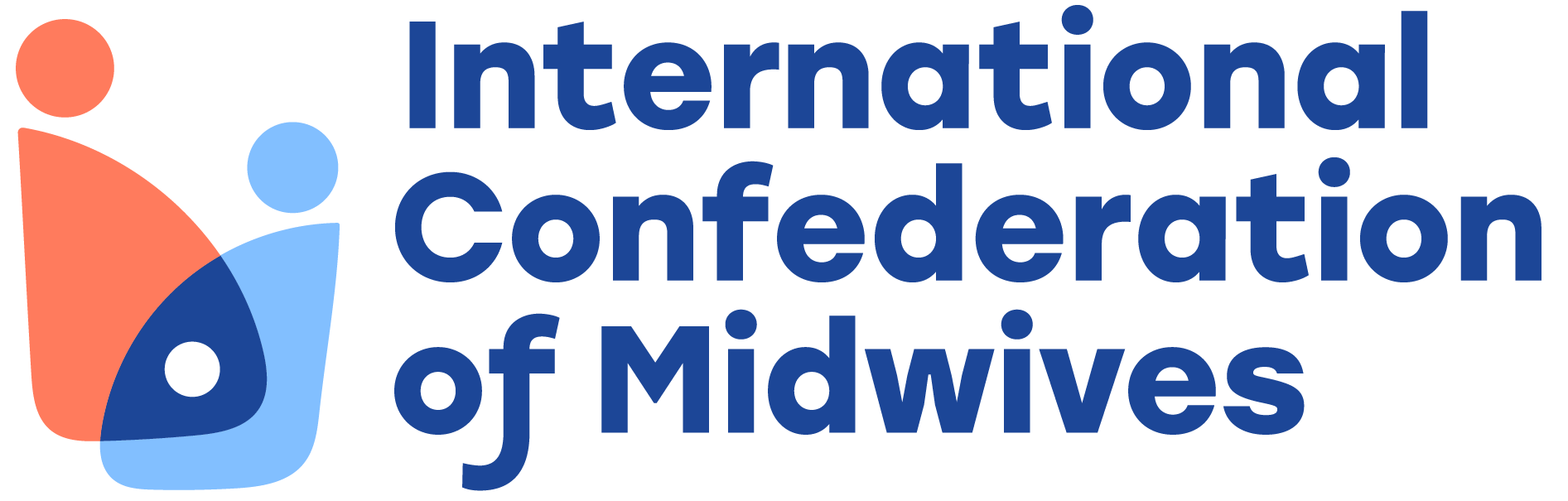
- Formation: 1919; 107 years ago
- Type: INGO
- Headquarters: Koninginnegracht 60, 2514 AE The Hague, Netherlands
- CEO: Anna af Ugglas
- President: Sandra Oyarzo Torres
- Website: internationalmidwives.org
- Formerly called: International Midwives Union (1919–1954)

The International Confederation of Midwives (ICM) supports, represents and works to strengthen professional associations of midwives on a global basis. At present, ICM has over 139 members, representing midwifery associations in around 118 countries across the 6 regions of the world.

The ICM works with midwives and midwifery associations globally to secure women's rights and access to midwifery care before, during and after childbirth. The ICM has worked alongside UN agencies and other partners for decades in global initiatives to help reduce the numbers of mothers and babies who die in and around childbirth.

== Projects ==
=== Midwifery education ===
The education standards were developed in tandem with the update of essential competencies for basic midwifery practice, which define the core content of any midwifery education programme.

== History ==
Midwives have been making efforts to meet internationally for over 100 years. There are records of a midwives' conference held in Berlin, Germany, in the year 1900, which over 1,000 midwives attended. This was arranged at a time without the use of telephones, computers, credit cards or aeroplanes, and women travelling on their own was difficult and not always acceptable.

In 1919, a group of European midwives, centred in Antwerp, Belgium, established the first beginnings of what was to become the International Confederation of Midwives. By this time, many countries already had a national association of midwives; communication among them increased and a series of regular meetings was launched.

During the 1930s and 1940s, travel and communication in Europe was disrupted by war and unrest. The detailed records of the earlier midwives' meetings and documents were destroyed. However, efforts to continue international work continued. In 1954, the initiative grew again in London, UK. The name of 'International Confederation of Midwives' was decided, and regular triennial congresses were held since 1954.

The ICM now has over 100 members – all autonomous midwifery associations, from around 100 countries spanning four regions: Africa, Asia Pacific, the Americas and Europe. Each member association sends delegates to the ICM Council, which is the overall governing body; each region elects representatives to a smaller board, which oversees the continuing business of the Confederation.

The ICM Council decided in 1999 to move the location of the headquarters office from London to The Hague, in the Netherlands, and it has been established there ever since. The headquarters permanent staff has increased from the appointment in 1987 of one part-time executive secretary, to the present larger group including the Secretary General, Programme Co-ordinator, Communications Manager and other part-time administrative assistance. The ICM journal, International Midwifery, is in its 18th year of communicating "to, from and among midwives across the world" and the ICM website at www.internationalmidwives.org has been assisting speedier access to ICM news and activities since 2000.

International congresses are held every three years. The site of each is decided six years ahead, and the event is co-hosted by ICM and one of its member associations. Venues over the past 50 years have included Jerusalem, Kobe, Manila, Santiago, Sydney, Vancouver and Washington, as well as numerous European cities. These congresses have become the major regular focus for midwives' global business, professional and scientific meetings. In addition, regional meetings and conferences are often held in the years between congresses.

The ICM is an official supporting organisation of Healthcare Information For All by 2015, a global initiative.

== Member associations ==
Since its founding, the ICM has grown from a small group of midwifery associations in western Europe to a major confederation of over 100 autonomous member associations from countries in every part of the globe. Criteria for membership demand that each association is headed by midwives who determine their own governance and activities.

- A: Afghanistan: Afghan Midwives Association, Argentina: Colegio de Obstetricas de la Provincia de Buenos Aires, Australia: Australian College of Midwives, Austria – Österreichisches Hebammengremium
- B: Bangladesh – Bangladesh Midwifery Society, Barbados – Barbados Nurses Association, Midwives Group, Belgium – Belgian Midwives Association (BMA), Benin – Association des Sages-Femmes du Bénin, Bosnia and Herzegowina – Udruzenje Babica u Bosni I Herscegovini, Brazil – Associação Brazileira de Obstetrizes e Enfermeiros Obstetras, Burkina Faso – Association Burkininabé des Sages-Femmes, Bulgaria – Alliance of Bulgarian Midwives
- C: Cambodia – Cambodia Midwives Association, Cameroon – Assocasfiasar, Canada – Canadian Association of Midwives, Chile – Colegio de Matronas de Chile, China – Zhejiang Midwives' Association (An Affiliate of the Zhejiang Nurses' Association), Croatia – Hrvatska Udruga Primalja, Cyprus – Cyprus Nurses and Midwives Association, Czech Republic – Czech Confederation of Midwives
- D: Denmark – Danish Association of Midwives
- E: Ecuador – Federación Nacional de Obstetrices y Obstetras del Ecuador, Estonia – Estonian Midwives Association, Ethiopia – The Ethiopian Nurse Midwives Association
- F: Finland – Federation of Finnish Midwives, France – Collège National des Sages-Femmes
- G: Gabon – Association des Sages femmes du Gabon, Gambia – The Gambia Midwives' Association, Georgia – Midwives Association of Georgia (MAG), Germany – Bund Deutscher Hebammen, Ghana – Ghana Registered Midwives' Association, Greece – The Hellenic Midwives' Association
- H: Haiti – Association des Infirmieres Sages-Femmes d'Haiti, Hong Kong – Hong Kong Midwives' Association, Hungary – Országos Bábaszövetség
- I: Iceland – Icelandic Midwives' Association, India – Society of Midwives of India, Indonesia – Indonesian Midwives Association, Iran – Iran Midwifery Population, Ireland – Irish Nurses and Midwives Association (INMO), Israel – Israel Midwives'
- J: Jamaica – Jamaica Midwives' Association, Japan – Japanese Midwives' Association, Japan – Japan Academy of Midwifery, Japan – Midwives' Division, Japanese Nursing Association
- K: Kenya – Midwives' Chapter of the National Nurses Association of Kenya, Korea, Republic of – Korean Midwives' Association
- L: Latvia – Association of Midwives of Latvia, Lebanon – Association des Sages-Femmes Diplomées de la Faculté Francaise de Médecine, Lesotho – Independent Midwives Association Lesotho, Liberia – Liberian Midwives' Association, Luxembourg – Association Luxembourgeoise des Sages-Femmes
- M: Madagascar – Fédération Nationale des Sages Femmes de Madagascar, Malawi – The Association of Malawian Midwives, Mali – Association des Sages-Femmes du Mali (ASFM), Malta – Midwives Association of Malta, Mongolia – Mongolian Midwives and Feldsher's Association, Morocco- Association Marocaine de Sages-Femmes, Mozambique – Association of Midwives of Mozambique
- N: Netherlands Koninklijke Nederlandse Organisatie van Verloskundigen, New Zealand – New Zealand College of Midwives Inc., Nigeria – Professional Association of Midwives of Nigeria, Norway – Norwegian Nurses' Association National Midwifery Section, Norway – Norwegian Association of Midwives, Namibia – Independent Midwives Association of Namibia (IMANA)
- P: Pakistan – Midwifery Association of Pakistan, Papua New Guinea – Papua New Guinea Midwifery Society, Paraguay – Asociación de Obstetras del Paraguay (A.O.P.), Peru – Colegio de Obstetrices del Peru, Philippines – Integrated Midwives' Association of the Philippines, Philippines – National Capital Region Midwives Association Inc., Philippines – Philippine League of Government and Private Midwives Inc., Poland – Polish Midwives Association, Portugal – Associação Portuguesa Dos Enfermeiros Obstetras (APEO)
- R: Republic of Macedonia – Macedonian Association of Nurses and Midwives, Russia – Interregional League of Midwives of Russia
- S: Sarawak – Sarawak Midwives' Association, Senegal – Association Nationale des Sages-Femmes du Sénégal (ANSFES), Sierra Leone – Sierra Leone Midwives' Association, Slovenia – Zbornica Zdravstvene Nege-Slovenije, South Africa – The Society of Midwives of South Africa, Spain – Asociacion Espanola de Matronas, Spain – Consejo General de Enfermeria (Vocalia Matrona), Spain – Federación de Asociaciones de Matronas (FAME), Sri Lanka – Government Midwifery Service Association 'Janasuwasevana', Suriname – Suriname Organization of Midwives, Sweden – Swedish Association of Midwives (Svenska Barnmorskeforbundet), Switzerland – Swiss Federation of Midwives
- T: Taiwan – Taiwan Midwives Association, Tanzania – Tanzania Registered Midwives' Association (TAMA), Trinidad & Tobago – Trinidad & Tobago Association of Midwives, Turkey – Midwives Association of Turkey,
- U: Uganda – Uganda Private Midwives' Association (UPMA), Uganda – Uganda National Association for Nurses and Midwives (UNANM), United Arab Emirates – Midwives Section, Emirates Nursing Association, United Kingdom – Association of Radical Midwives, United Kingdom – Independent Midwives' Association, United Kingdom – Midwifery Society, Royal College of Nursing, United Kingdom – The Royal College of Midwives, United States of America – American College of Nurse-Midwives (ACNM), United States of America – Midwives' Alliance of North America (MANA), Uruguay – Asociacion Obstétrica del Uruguay
- V: Vietnam – Vietnamese Association of Midwives
- Y: Republic of Yemen – National Yemeni Midwives Association
- Z: Zambia – Midwives Association of Zambia, Zimbabwe – Zimbabwe Confederation of Midwives
