= Margaret Stephen (midwife) =

British midwife

Margaret Stephen was a British midwife, midwifery teacher and author, active in London in the late 18th century, who published Domestic Midwife (1795), one of a handful of textbooks on midwifery from that era that is by a woman. She was trained by a male student of the famous male midwife, William Smellie, and practised for more than thirty years. She may have attended some of Queen Charlotte's births. Her own pupils were all women, and she is the only female midwife recorded to have used an obstetrical machine in her instruction.

Her manual, addressed not only to midwives but to all women who might become pregnant, mixes anatomical and physiological information, instruction about care for the mother during and after labour, and non-medical topics such as strategies for protection against accusations of misconduct. Published against a background of increasing male dominance of the midwifery profession, the book promotes the idea that female midwives, particularly those who were (like Stephen) themselves mothers, were the natural default for normal births. Stephen favoured a non-interventionist approach to labour, and her book strongly criticises some male midwives for an overreliance on the use of forceps. While Domestic Midwife was not particularly well received by critics during her lifetime, the physician and medical historian James Hobson Aveling describes the book in 1872 as "perhaps the best upon the subject that has been written by any woman" in English.

== Biography ==
Much of Margaret Stephen's background is obscure. She was Christian, and appears to have been educated, claiming to speak languages other than English; she might have been an impoverished gentlewoman. She is believed to have had nine children, (Note: Pam Lieske attributes this information to James Hobson Aveling.) with Stephen being her married name. Her address was 42 Ely Place, Holborn in London. She was trained in midwifery by a male student of the famous male midwife, William Smellie, possibly his successor, John Harvie, whose teaching involved obstetrical machines (anatomically accurate models). This was unusual for the time; most female midwives learned their profession by being apprenticed to a woman practitioner for 3–6 years.

Some sources state that she was the midwife at one or more of Queen Charlotte's births (who had fifteen children between 1763 and 1783), (Note: For example, Aveling, Towler and Bramall, Moscucci, and Leiske; Clippingale, writing in 1916, also cites Huish's Memoir of George IV; however, attending Queen Charlotte is not mentioned in Stephen's Oxford Dictionary of National Biography entry.) although this is also given as Mrs Draper. Stephen also attended women too poor to pay for a physician, and advocates for midwives to moderate their fees and to attend women regardless of their ability to pay. She attended women outside London. She had been practising her profession for more than thirty years in 1795, when she published her textbook. Stephen taught midwifery to women only, and deemed the profession appropriate for respectable educated women. She is the only female midwife recorded to have used an obstetrical machine to instruct her students in turning the baby and the use of obstetrical instruments such as forceps, as well as the earliest known to cover such topics as anatomy and instrument use in her instruction. In addition to medical training, she covered topics such as how a midwife could protect herself against accusations of misconduct. She suggested that her students should write down notes on her instruction.

Doreen A. Evenden in her Oxford Dictionary of National Biography entry describes Stephen as "articulate and intelligent". Evenden describes Domestic Midwife as combining traditional female practices with male medical science, while the American academic Pam Lieske considers that Stephen "functioned very much like a male midwife". According to the British academic Janette C. Allotey, she understood the current medical views on childbirth better than her female peers. The British midwife and lecturer Anna Bosanquet describes Stephen as an "independent thinker" who was "well read" and who displayed a "high degree of professional integrity and judgement" in her work. However, her decision, documented in a case study in Domestic Midwife, to conceal a doctor's potential responsibility for the death of a baby is criticised by the British academic Gemma McKenzie as an "early example of disrespect and mistreatment of the birthing mother", who is "deceived and infantilised" by Stephen as well as the doctor. Her conduct in this case is also criticised by the American midwife and lecturer Jane Beal.

It is unknown when Stephen died.

== Domestic Midwife ==
Midwifery in Britain had largely been a women's profession until around 1720, with surgeons, then an exclusively male profession, only being employed in extremis to remove a stillborn child after a protracted unsuccessful labour. In the following decade, surgeons started to have some success in delivering live births in cases of obstructed labour, using a technique relying on obstetric instruments, particularly forceps, and by around the middle of the century, male midwives (called "man-midwives" or "accoucheurs") were increasingly becoming fashionable, especially among the wealthy. Texts written by men during this period, such as A Treatise on the Theory and Practice of Midwifery by Smellie (1752–64), A Treatise of Midwifery by Alexander Hamilton (1781) and An Introduction to the Practice of Midwifery by Thomas Denman (1788), criticise the traditional practices of midwifery, denigrate the natural experience of women in matters of pregnancy and childbirth, and emphasise the advantages of anatomical and physiological instruction not generally then open to women, as well as the use of obstetrical instruments.

It was against this background that Stephen brought out her own textbook, Domestic Midwife; Or, The Best Means of Preventing Danger in Child-birth Considered in 1795. It was one of a handful of manuals on the topic in English to be published by a woman; a total of six examples came out in 1671–1798, a fraction of the number published by men. Earlier examples include A Complete Practice of Midwifery by Sarah Stone (1737) and A Treatise on the Art of Mid-wifery by Elizabeth Nihell (1760); Stone's book has a greater focus on case studies, while Nihell's text forms a "polemic against men-midwives". Additionally, a few women wrote manuals in France and Germany, including Justine Siegemund (1636–1706), Angélique du Coudray (1714/15–1794) and Marie-Louis La Chapelle (1769–1821).

Domestic Midwife was aimed at a female readership, not only women training as midwives or birth attendants, but also pregnant women and women who might become pregnant. With other women's manuals of the time, it formed part of what the American academic Ellen Malenas Ledoux calls a "textual offensive" that promoted to women the idea that female midwives, particularly those who were themselves mothers, were the natural default for normal births. Stephen recounts a brief history of midwifery, asserting that it was Louis XIV's mistress who, in 1663, started a trend to employ male midwives. She argues that male midwives remove opportunities for women to work, and that female midwives are not inferior to male midwives. She describes the "anguish" of labour, and writes that only women who have experienced childbirth could understand the pain associated with manual interventions, which was dismissed by male midwives. She writes that the mother's privacy and dignity are best served by a female midwife, and further argues that there is a possibility of inappropriate intimacy arising during the course of delivery. Explicitly drawing on her personal experiences of childbirth, she warns that "impure thoughts" can arise in the woman, particularly in intermissions between the painful episodes during delivery, and calls attention to the fact that "some women speak with rapture of the men who deliver them of their children".

Stephen excoriates some male midwives for questioning the character and competence of female midwives, and accuses some who teach female students of overcharging them compared with male students and also of withholding information from them. She strongly criticises the overreliance on forceps of some male midwives, and states that they should never be used without the woman's knowledge, a practice advocated by Smellie. In general Stephen advocates for the woman making her own decisions where possible. She recommends calling an experienced (male) physician in problematic cases, rather than a male midwife, suggesting that midwives seek strong working relationships with physicians who have appropriate skills. She writes, however, that the need for an obstetric surgeon is rare, when the midwife is properly trained, estimating "once in several hundred labours", and adding that she had only required an obstetric surgeon in eight cases during her career.

The book is intended as a brief practical manual; Stephen states that she curtailed the book's length (108 pages) so that it could readily be carried and consulted by midwives while they were working. It was priced cheaply and lacks illustrations. There are eleven chapters, as well as introductory material. Despite the avowed audience encompassing all women, its approach is more medically focused than other books by female midwives, and Stephen refers to her clients as "patients". The book covers relevant anatomy and physiology in detail, particularly the structure of the pelvis and pelvic bones; Stephen considers that the most common cause of problematic births was the baby's head being too large for the mother's pelvis. It details how to perform a vaginal examination and how to locate where the baby's head is positioned. Domestic Midwife classifies labour into five groups, three where it is the baby's head that presents: natural (where the duration is under 24 hours), lingering (longer than 48 hours) and difficult (where intervention is required); as well as preternatural (where the baby's head does not present) and complex (twin births or births where any complication or emergency occurs). It generally advocates a non-interventionist approach to care, suggesting that no intervention was needed until the woman had been in labour for two or even three days, in reaction to a move towards intervening when a first labour exceeded 24 hours. It describes best practices for treating obstetric emergencies including prolapse of the umbilical cord (when the umbilical cord is expelled before the baby), shoulder dystocia (when the baby's shoulder becomes caught on the mother's pubic bone) and postpartum bleeding in the mother, and details how to resuscitate a newborn baby. Although Stephen recommends using forceps as little as possible, she considers that "delivery with instruments has saved some lives", and covers their proper use to minimise damage both to the baby's skull and to the mother's perineum. It also includes the treatment of common conditions during pregnancy, such as nausea, as well as care of the mother after the birth.

A short review of Domestic Midwife appeared in The British Critic in 1796, which praises the author for basing her text on the "latest and best" authors on the topic, but criticises her for encouraging women to use obstetric instruments. A longer review was published in The Analytical Review that year, which describes the instruction as "simple and clear" but castigates Stephen for not behaving with feminine "diffidence and modesty" in writing about male midwives. The book received a negative review in The Critical Review in 1796; the reviewer considers the book "too learnedly treated" for pregnant women yet "too ignorantly" treated to be of benefit to midwifery students, concluding that those exceptional parts that are of value must have been contributed by another author, a view shared by Samuel Merriman, who asserted that the book had been written by the journalist Philip Thicknesse. The British physician and medical historian James Hobson Aveling, in the earliest history of female midwifery in Britain, published in 1872, describes the book as "perhaps the best upon the subject that has been written by any woman" in English. Domestic Midwife was not reprinted, and is now known in a single copy.

== Publication ==
- Margaret Stephen. Domestic Midwife; or, The Best Means of Preventing Danger in Child-birth Considered (S. W. Fores; 1795)

== References and notes ==
Sources

- James Hobson Aveling. English Midwives, Their History and Prospects (J. A. Churchill; 1872)
- Jean Donnison. Midwives and Medical Men: A History of the Struggle for the Control of Childbirth (Taylor & Francis; 2023) ISBN 9781000853155
- Doreen Evenden. The Midwives of Seventeenth-Century London. (Cambridge University Press; 2006) ISBN 9780521027854
- Ellen Malenas Ledoux. Laboring Mothers: Reproducing Women and Work in the Eighteenth Century (University of Virginia Press; 2023) Project MUSE 114657, ISBN 9780813950297
- Pam Lieske. 'Made in Imitation of Real Women and Children': Obstetrical Machines in Eighteenth-Century Britain. In: The Female Body in Medicine and Literature (Andrew Mangham, Greta Depledge, eds), (Liverpool University Press; 2011) doi:10.5949/UPO9781846316289.005, ISBN 9781846316289
- Pam Lieske. Deformity of the Maternal Pelvis in Late Eighteenth-Century Britain. In: The Secrets of Generation: Reproduction in the Long Eighteenth Century (Darren Wagner, Raymond Stephanson, eds), (University of Toronto Press; 2015) Project MUSE 106433, ISBN 9781442666924
- Pam Lieske. Eighteenth-Century British Midwifery (Part I, volume 1) (Taylor & Francis; 2024a) ISBN 9781040288153
- Pam Lieske. Eighteenth-Century British Midwifery (Part II, volume 7) (Taylor & Francis; 2024b) ISBN 9781040236307
- Ornella Moscucci. The Science of Woman: Gynaecology and Gender in England, 1800–1929 (Cambridge University Press; 1993) ISBN 9780521447959
- Julie Peakman, Sarah Watkins. Making Babies: Eighteenth-Century Attitudes towards Conception, Reproduction, and Childbirth. In: Wagner, Stephanson, eds
- Jean Towler, Joan Bramall. Midwives in History and Society (Taylor & Francis; 2023) ISBN 9781000853551
- Rebecca Whiteley. Birth Figures: Early Modern Prints and the Pregnant Body (University of Chicago Press; 2023) ISBN 9780226823133, doi:10.7208/chicago/9780226823133.001.0001
- Robert Woods, Chris Galley. Mrs Stone & Dr Smellie: Eighteenth-Century Midwives and their Patients (Liverpool University Press; 2015) ISBN 9781781382158, doi:10.5949/liverpool/9781781381410.001.0001
