= Cryn =

Cryn or Cryns is a given name and surname. Notable people with the name include:

- Vincent Cryns, American endocrinologist
- Yvonne Cryns (born 1951), American midwife and political activist
- Cryn Fredericks, chief engineer of the New Netherland colony in 1625 and 1626
