= Samuel Merriman =

Samuel Merriman may refer to:

- Samuel Merriman (1731–1818), English physician
- Samuel Merriman (1771–1852), English physician
