= Sarah Stone (midwife) =

English midwife

Sarah Stone (active 1701-1737) was an English midwife and author during the early modern period. She advocated for the better education of female midwives, speaking out against the rise of male-midwives in her line of work. She is considered a "champion of her sex and a disciple and advocate of the Enlightenment."

== Life and career ==
Although her date of birth is unknown, Sarah Stone was born to the midwife Mrs. Holmes of Bridgewater, who was quite well-known despite there not being many records about her. When she came of age, Stone acted as her mother's apprentice for six years, a training that concluded around 1702. However it is cited that Stone began her own practice in Bridgewater around the year of 1701, although some considered her too young for the job at that time. Stone married a surgeon-apothecary and had children (the number unspecified, although at least one daughter became a midwife in 1726,) as it was custom for midwives to have experienced childbirth themselves. Marrying a surgeon apothecary might have given Stone easier access to medical literature and therefore allowing her to stay up to date with contemporary medical issues. Also, it most likely gave her a heightened sense of the future plans of male medical professionals to take over the practice entirely, sparking her dislike of male intervention in the midwife practice.

In 1705-1720, Stone was staying in Taunton, Somerset, England where there were no other "man-midwives," meaning there was no obstetric surgeon in the town. Thus, all of the obstetric emergencies befell Stone as she was the most advanced midwife around and many duties and tasks were set upon her to perform. At the peak of her career she took care of about three hundred births per year. Although most went well, not all of the births went smoothly, and Stone faced many births where the child did not live or there were complications during the birthing process that affected the outcome. Stone rarely used any tools or instruments as aid in the practice; she used knife in four circumstances over a thirty-five year period. Instead, she developed a certain maneuver that was successful enough for her, despite the differing views of the growing man-midwife population. Stone faced some health problems due to her ongoing schedule of midwifery so she moved to Bristol. Bristol had competition for Stone, with multiple other midwives or man-midwives, however she managed to gain deserved recognition there. Stone remained in differing view than the man-midwives and advocated for the importance of women in the practice because they had been doing it for centuries. Stone wrote a treatise to advocate for her argument and it gained popularity when it came out in 1737. However, not long after her work came out, Sarah Stone moved to London where there was no information about her recorded after that year.

Sarah Stone was a well-regarded midwife of her time. She was an excellent example of English midwifery. Stone could be compared to Madame Angélique du Coudray of France, who was a well-trained and educated midwife; du Coudray had invented her own machine of a women's pelvic area to give instructions for the birthing process. Unlike Stone, du Coudray did not have children of her own, but adopted a girl as her niece, who also became a midwife. These women were influential in their practice across their countries. Many women, and men most likely, benefited from the information that they passed on from their experiences. Stone, although not inventing a machine or becoming a royally active midwife like du Coudray, left her legacy in her treatise, fighting for the female profession of midwifery.

== The Rise of Man-Midwifery ==
For centuries, women ruled the sphere of midwifery. However, by the eighteenth century, there was a rise of males in the profession. Soon, this practice became highly male dominated despite the resistance of many female midwives. Historians have attempted to answer the question of why males took over; some have said that males took over because of religious, medical, or other reasons, but the main one being the choice of the mother giving birth. Women most likely would choose a man over a woman because they had more education in the medical field. Sarah Stone was known for being outspoken against man-midwives and advocated for the recognition of midwifery being a women's profession.

== A Complete Practice of Midwifery ==
In 1737, Sarah Stone published a guide for women who practiced midwifery to follow and use, called A Complete Practice of Midwifery. Stone had kept many detailed records of the births that she attended. For the treatise, she collected the fifty most challenging or interesting births as a guide for women to follow in similar cases. This treatise, as Stone calls it, was published to help women in their performance in the art without calling upon men for help and to resist the rise of man-midwives. Stone felt that women were being cheated out of credit and service by men who came in to do the birthing process, gaining most, if not all of the credit. She was at the forefront fighting for her sex's ability; this treatise could help any woman through difficult scenarios in the practice of midwifery.

Stone discusses many issues with men becoming midwives, such as their lack of knowledge of birth and the birthing experience itself. These men had never gone through the process of childbirth themselves, and Stone used this to argue for why it was a bad idea to have man-midwives. She stressed that, unlike women, men did not know what the pain felt like and could not judge how a woman felt during the birthing experience. In turn, they would most likely give a lack of wanted sympathy for the woman bearing the child:

"… for it must be supposed that there is a tender regard one Woman bears to another, and a natural sympathy in those that have gone thro’ the Pangs of Childbearing; which, doubtless, occasion a compassion for those that labour under those circumstances, which no man can be judge of."

Stone mentioned that women who were educated properly in midwifery did not need a man around to birth a child or help them in birthing children. It was an unnecessary practice, and women were capable of doing it themselves. Sarah Stone was an early feminist who did not want something that had been a women’s job taken away; it would only take away power from them as well if men would take over this profession.

Her fifty detailed observations in the text of the births that she attended to range from births where the child was being born breeched to births where the mother had been in labor for eight days. Most of the births that ended in the death of the child or mother Stone blamed on the ignorance of the midwife that had started the delivery. In her "Observation XXL The Delivery of a Woman, who was kept in hard Labour many hours, by the ignorance of her Midwife," Stone details such a case:

"The first Pain she had, after I was with her, I broke her Waters, and was forc’d to be very quick to receive the Child; for her Pains being violent, and the Child so long confin’d by the thickness of the Skin that held the Waters, as soon as the Child had liberty, it was born in less than half a minute, which astonish’d the Midwife and Women: they would fain have prevailed on me to have told them what I did; but I chose not to inform them at that time. It is very evident, that this Woman suffer’d seven or eight hours Pain more than she need have done, had she had a Midwife of judgment in the beginning of her Travail."

In many cases, Stone was sent for after the original midwife attending the birth could not deliver the child or there were other complications. Stone discusses in some accounts that the child could have been saved if the midwife was not so ignorant; however despite the many obstacles and complications, Stone was able to safely deliver many of the children and all was well.

== Death ==
There is no exact date of death for Sarah Stone, however it was mentioned that she was still alive in 1737, the year that she published her treatise. After her treatise was published, Stone moved to London and disappeared from public eye and records, thus giving no exact date or estimation of when she died.

== Work ==
- Stone, Sarah (1737). A Complete Practice of Midwifery.

== See also ==
Other 18th-century British female midwives who wrote midwifery manuals include:

- Elizabeth Nihell
- Margaret Stephen
