= Nihell =

Nihell is a surname. Notable people with the surname include:

- Alanna Nihell (born 1985), Northern Irish boxer
- Elizabeth Nihell (1723–1776), English midwife, obstetrics writer, and polemicist
