= Sarah Stone =

Sarah Stone may refer to:

- Sarah Stone (midwife), 18th-century English midwife and author
- Sarah Stone (artist) (1760–1844), English natural-history illustrator and painter
- Sarah Stone (tennis) (born 1982), Australian tennis player and coach
- Sarah Stone, contestant on the eighth season of US reality dating show The Bachelor
- Sarah Stone, contestant on the sixth season of Australian reality talent show The Voice Australia
