= Kwast =

Kwast is a surname. Notable people with the surname include:

- Barbara Kwast (born 1938), epidemiologist, midwife, and educator
- Frieda Kwast-Hodapp (1880–1949), a German pianist
- James Kwast (1852–1927), Dutch-German pianist
- Steven L. Kwast (fl. 1986), American soldier
