= Elizabeth Nihell =

19th-century midwife, obstetrics writer, and polemicist

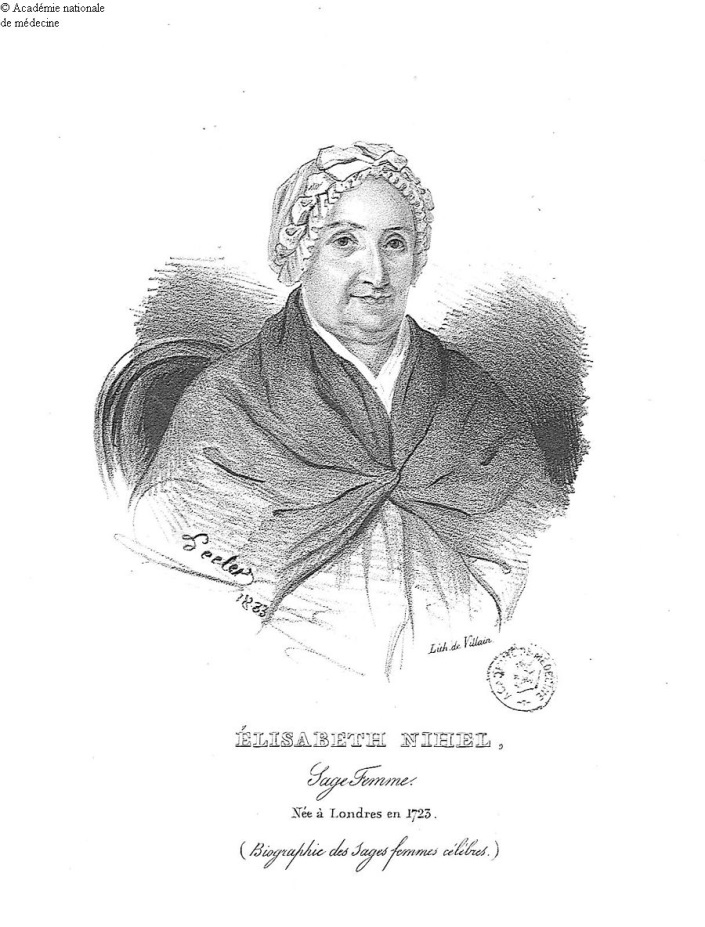
- Born: 1723
- Died: May 1776 (aged 53)
- Occupation: Midwife
- Spouse: Edward or Edmund Nihell

Elizabeth Nihell (1723 – May 1776) was an Englishwoman from London, who was a famous midwife, obstetrics writer, and polemicist. She was most famous for her outspoken stance against male midwives and for her publications.

== Background ==
Nihell was born in 1723 in London to French Catholic parents. There is little evidence on her earlier life before 1740 when she moved to Paris and married a man named Edmund or Edward Nihell, an Irish Catholic surgeon-apothecary from Clare. He was the fourth son in a well-known family of merchants, medical men, and priests. They did have at least one child, however there is little documentation on whether the child lived or not. In 1754, Nihell and her husband moved to Haymarket Street in London, where she started her career in midwifery. By 1771, her husband had abandoned her, leaving her unable to financially support herself with just her work as a midwife. Finally, in 1775 after facing many struggles, she had to turn to the parish for financial assistance. She was sent to the St Martins-in-the-Fields workhouse. A year later in May 1776 Nihell died and was buried in a pauper's grave. However, the cause of her death and location of her grave is unknown today.

== Career ==
Nihell started her midwife training in 1747 at the Hôtel Dieu in Paris for two years under Marie-Claude Pour. This was a long stay, however it was facilitated by the Duke of Orlèans which may have been the reason for the long stay. There she was able to train and witness over 2,000 births. This was a big accomplishment because women in this time did not attend schooling, especially in the medical field. The Hôtel Dieu in Paris was common hospital around this time, which taught midwifery especially by one famous midwife, Madame du Coudray, who was supported by King Louis XV. In 1754, Nihell and her husband moved to Britain and settled in Haymarket. After settling in, Nihell started to advertise herself as a midwife in the London Evening Post. This allowed Nihell to attend over 900 births as a midwife. In 1760, she published her first book called a Treatise on the Art of Midwifery, which was a criticism of William Smellie’s methods of childbirth and his use of forceps. Before the eighteenth century, male midwives in the birthing room were so rare there was little need for debate. However, due to the creation and spread of forceps, male midwives became more popular and the status of female midwives declined due to the acceptance of male midwives by the upper class English and the belief that women were unable to understand and perform obstetric techniques. Nihell's publication spoke about how instruments brought into the birthing room by male midwives were usually unnecessary and caused harm to the baby. Nihell also told readers that they had the right to any decisions in the birthing room, not the male midwives. Nihell's main concern was how these new obstetrical instruments would replace female midwives at a much greater cost to infant’s lives. Nihell believed that for an easy delivery, assistance from a midwife was all that was needed and for extreme situations all that was required was knowledge, experience, tenderness, and presence of mind. She even stated that male midwives would get paid more than female midwives. After publishing her work there were many people who criticized her. However, Nihell fought back with anonymous publications, letters to the press, and a treatise titled The Danger and Immodesty of the Present too General Customs of Unnecessarily Employing Men-Midwives (1772). She even called one critic a buffoon, which was unheard of as women in this time period were not supposed to be outspoken.

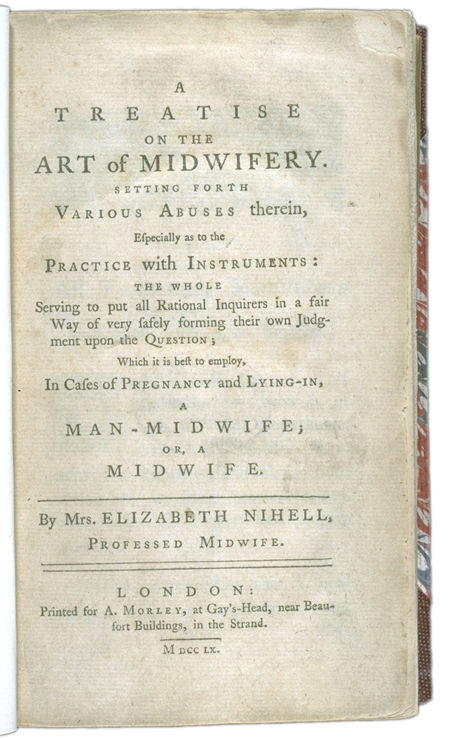
Elizabeth Nihell First publication

== List of works ==
- Treatise on the Art of Midwifery. Setting forth various abuses therein, especially as to the practice with instruments: the whole serving to put all rational inquirers in a fair way of very safely forming their own judgment upon the question; which it is best to employ, in cases of pregnancy and lying-in, a man-midwife; or, a midwife, 1760.
- The Danger and Immodesty of the Present too General Custom, 1772.

== See also ==
Other 18th-century British female midwives who wrote midwifery manuals include:

- Margaret Stephen
- Sarah Stone

== Bibliography ==
- "Banque D'images Et De Portraits." BIU Santé, Paris. Accessed 10 December 2014. http://www2.biusante.parisdescartes.fr/img/?refphot=anmpx22x2467 .
- Bosanquet, Anna. "Inspiration from the Past (3). Elizabeth Nihell, the 'anti-obstetric' Midwife." The Practising Midwife vol.12, no. 10 (2009): 46-48. http://www2.warwick.ac.uk/fac/arts/history/students/eportfolios/bosanquet/publications_presentations/nihell_practising_midwife_article.pdf.
- Bryant, Frankee. "Labour Pains: Elizabeth Nihell and the Struggle to Champion Female Midwifery." Bluestocking, no. 10 (2011). http://blue-stocking.org.uk/2011/10/20/labour-pains-elizabeth-nihell-and-the-struggle-to-champion-female-midwifery/
- Cody, Lisa Forman. Birthing the Nation Sex, Science, and the Conception of Eighteenth-century Britons. Oxford: Oxford University Press, 2005.
- Gelbart, Nina Rattner. The King's Midwife a History and Mystery of Madame Du Coudray. Berkeley, Calif.: University of California Press, 1998.
- Lay, Mary M. The Rhetoric of Midwifery Gender, Knowledge, and Power. New Brunswick, N.J.: Rutgers University Press, 2000.
- Litoff, Judy Barrett. American Midwives, 1860 to the Present. Westport, Conn.: Greenwood Press, 1978.
- McTavish, Lianne. Childbirth and the Display of Authority in Early Modern France. Burlington, VT: Ashgate Pub., 2005.
- Nihell, Elizabeth. A Treatise on the Art of Midwifery: Setting Forth Various Abuses Therein, Especially as to the Practice with Instruments : The Whole Serving to Put All Rational Inquirers in a Fair Way of Very Safely Forming Their Own Judgment upon the Question, Which It Is Best to Employ, in Cases of Pregnancy and Lying-in, a Man-midwife, Or, a Midwife. London: Printed for A. Morley ..., 1760.
- Ogilvie, Marilyn Bailey and Joy Harvey, eds., The Biographical Dictionary of Women in Science: Pioneering Lives from Ancient times to the Mid-20th Century. Vol. 2. New York: Routledge, 2000. 946.
- Romalis, Shelly. Childbirth, Alternatives to Medical Control. Austin: University of Texas Press, 1981.
- Rothman, Barbara Katz. In Labor: Women and Power in the Birthplace. New York: Norton, 1982.
- Shorter, Edward. A History of Women's Bodies. New York: Basic Books, 1982.
