= Charlotte Führer =

German author and midwife

Charlotte Führer (1834 – November 5, 1907) was a German author and midwife/"doctress".

She was born in Hanover, Germany, in 1834 as Johanne Louise Charlotte Heise, to Evangelical Lutheran parents; her father was a general in the Hanoverian Army.

At the age of 17, she married Ferdinand Adolph Führer, who she refers to by the pseudonym "Gustav Schroeder" in her book. Shortly afterwards, she and Ferdinand moved to New York City, in the United States. They had two daughters there, named Otillia and Maria. Ferdinand started a business selling imported German goods there, but the business failed, and in 1856 they moved back to Germany.

There, she enrolled in Hamburg University and became a midwife. During this time she had a third daughter, Louisa. In 1851, her father died. After she graduated, on April 17, 1859, she and her husband sailed to Montreal, where she practiced as a midwife for 30 years. Shortly after their arrival, she had a fourth daughter, Elizabeth. She went on to have another daughter, Laura, in 1860, and a son, Friedrich, in 1866. In the summer of 1873, Ottilia and Maria both died of typhus. During this time in Montreal, she wrote Mysteries of Montreal: Memoirs of a Midwife, a recollection of her experiences as a midwife in Montreal, published in 1881. In 1884 her son Friedrich also died of typhus. Charlotte herself succumbed to cancer on November 5, 1907.
