= Yvonne Cryns =

American midwife and activist (born 1951)

Yvonne Cryns (born 1951) is an American midwife and political activist. From 1991 to 2001, she served as a traditional midwife in Illinois and Wisconsin. Cryns has a Certified Professional Midwife (CPM) designation.

As a childbirth activist, she worked to restore childbirth rights to Illinois women and their families, speaking and providing public education on the topic and testifying at Legislative committee hearings.

Cryns introduced several bills to the Illinois legislature for many years in an effort to gain licensure for midwives. She assisted at over 300 births. Cryns has seven children, six of whom were born at home.

== Legal issues ==
=== Department of Professional Regulation ===
On April 7, 2000, Cryns was ordered to cease and desist the practice of medicine, nursing and midwifery by the Department of Professional Regulation, ("DPR") since she was not a registered nurse in Illinois although she did have a license in Wisconsin. She sued DPR, claiming the agency had no jurisdiction to regulate her practice.

A judge ruled Cryns had not violated any state regulations and vacated the agency's cease and desist order. However, it was only a hollow victory, temporarily, because a condition of her bond in the criminal case prevented her from practicing as a midwife. On May 7, 2001, the Illinois Appellate Court for the second district reversed the trial court, "finding that the trial court abused its discretion in ruling on plaintiff’s request for a preliminary injunction without viewing a videotape of the birth, which had been entered into evidence." Upon remand, the trial court granted Cryns' motion and the department appealed to the Supreme Court of Illinois

In May 2002, the Supreme Court of Illinois agreed to hear the civil case of Illinois Department of Professional Regulation vs. Yvonne Cryns, over whether the DPR has the right to regulate unlicensed professions. Oral arguments were heard on November 30, 2002.

In July 2003, the Illinois Supreme Court ruled that direct-entry midwifery fell under the jurisdiction of the Advanced Practice Nursing Act, which identifies nursing as including “the assessment of healthcare needs ... the promotion, maintenance, and restoration of health ... counseling, patient education, health education, and patient advocacy.” The court also found that Cryns was practicing nursing or midwifery without a license, based upon the testimony of Louis Verzi, the baby's father, as well as the videotape admitted into evidence. This created a precedent where women who attended at-home births now risked being prosecuted. A midwife could not effectively practice his or her profession in Illinois without being licensed as a nurse. After the ruling, Cryns agreed to stop helping women give birth.

=== August 2000 birth and death ===
On August 19, 2000, Cryns assisted a home birth in Round Lake Beach, Illinois, where, after the boy was born via breech birth, Cryns attempted cardiopulmonary resuscitation before calling 9-1-1.

=== Trial ===
Cryns was charged with involuntary manslaughter of both a born child and of an unborn child. The main piece of evidence in the trial was a videotape of the birth, showing the complete 46 minutes from the time the child's foot first became visible until the birth was complete. Prosecutors claimed Cryns was reckless and contributed to the boy's death by not calling for emergency help sooner, trying for 12 minutes to revive the baby before telling his father to call 911 because she did not want the authorities to know that she was violating her cease-and-desist order. Cryns told the Verzis, "I don't want you to tell [the emergency crew] I was here," adding "Do me a favor, get all my stuff out of here."

She was charged with reckless disregard for the safety of the baby boy, who in a feet-first position in his mother's uterus, presented a risky delivery that doctors and many midwives generally believe warrants a hospital birth and often a Caesarean section. Cryns claimed her actions were in keeping with accepted midwife practice and the boy's death was beyond her control.

Throughout the trial, the baby's parents (Louis and Heather Verzi) supported Cryns. The Verzis testified that they had known they were taking a risk by having a breech baby delivered at home, and they had signed an informed-consent agreement taking responsibility.

==== Not guilty for unborn child ====
In June 2001, a jury found her not guilty for the unborn child and was deadlocked (10-2 in favor of conviction) for the born child charge. Cryns' attorney, Andrea Lyon, tried to argue that a second trial constituted double jeopardy. Her motion to dismiss was denied in November 2001, so Lyon appealed to the Illinois Appellate Court.

In September, Cryns agreed to the plea bargain on the misdemeanor charge of reckless conduct, and sentenced to 18 months probation.

==== Legal expenses ====
The judge also ruled that part of her bail bond cash be used to pay for a transcript copy of her original. Lyon also appealed that, arguing that Cryns is "legally indigent", and that the bond was paid for by "friends and church members" for whom it should remain for.

An affidavit filed with a motion to get a free transcript of the testimony in her earlier trial showed that the Cryns owed an estimated $255,000 in legal expenses, for both her defense on the criminal charges and in her civil court battle against the Illinois Department of Professional Regulation.
