= Vincent Cryns =

- Education: Harvard College and Harvard Medical School, Boston, MA
- Known for: cancer
- Scientific career
- Workplaces: University of Wisconsin-Madison
- Website: www.medicine.wisc.edu/endocrinology/crynslab

Vincent Cryns is the Chief of the Division of Endocrinology, Diabetes & Metabolism at the University of Wisconsin School of Medicine and Public Health and holds the Marian A. and Rodney P. Burgenske Chair in Diabetes Research.

== Early life ==
Cryns attended Williamsville East High School in Williamsville, New York, received his bachelor's degree from Harvard College and his M.D. from Harvard Medical School in 1987.

== Career ==
After completing residency and specialty training at Massachusetts General Hospital in Boston, Massachusetts, he became an assistant professor at Northwestern University. He later moved to Madison, Wisconsin to chair the Division of Endocrinology, Diabetes, and Metabolism at the University of Wisconsin School of Medicine and Public Health.

Cryns is on the editorial board of the American Journal of Cancer Research, the Journal of Drug Metabolism and Toxicology, the Journal of Signal Transduction, the Journal of Stem Cell Research and Therapy, and Molecular Endocrinology. In 2010, Cryns served as the associate editor-in-chief of the American Journal of Cancer Research.

Cryns's lab is focused on understanding apoptosis, the process by which cancer cells die, and has published on how methionine restriction sensitizes cancer cells to TRAIL receptor agonists. The Cryns lab also showed that the metastasis of breast cancer to the brain and lungs is dependent upon the protein αB-crystallin.
