= Barbara Kwast =

British epidemiologist and midwife

- Born: Barbara E. Kwast; 1938 (age 87–88)
- Education: Liverpool School of Tropical Medicine, University of Wales Medical School
- Known for: Research on maternal deaths and reducing maternal mortality rates

Barbara E. Kwast (born 1938) is an epidemiologist, midwife and educator. Her research on the cause of maternal deaths has, according to the UNFPA, contributed to reducing the maternal mortality rates in the world.

== Life ==
=== Education ===
Kwast studied to become a nurse and midwife, and specialized in tropical medicine and hygiene. She obtained a Midwivery Tutor Diploma in England, later a MSc in Public health from Liverpool School of Tropical Medicine in England, and was the first midwife to receive a PhD in epidemiology from the University of Wales Medical School in Cardiff.

=== Career ===
Kwast began her international career in Malawi, where she worked together with a gynecologist in Malawi who had been taught fistula surgery by Catherine and Reginald Hamlin at the Addis Ababa Fistula Hospital in Ethiopia. She established the first registered course for midwifery in Malawi in 1971. On leave from her work, she met the Hamlins in Addis Ababa in 1971. She kept in touch with the Hamlins, and moved to Ethiopia in the early 1980s. Between 1981 and 1986 she lectured in primary care midwifery at the Medical Faculty of the Addis Ababa University.

In Addis Ababa, Kwast also performed a study on the maternal and child health clinics in the city. The outcome of the study was compiled in a book, that was also submitted to the University of Wales for a Doctor of Philosophy in 1985. Gillian M McIlwaine in a review states that Kwast, with the book, titled Unsafe motherhood – a monumental challenge, "has performed an important service for the women of Addis Ababa and by describing the methods of her enquiry she will help others to do likewise in different parts of the world." Part of her dissertation is the first, and in September 2020 still the only population study on maternal mortality in Ethiopia.

The dissertation and degree also took her to Geneva, Switzerland, and the World Health Organization (WHO), in 1986. Working for the WHO, Kwast helped launch an initiative called the Safe Motherhood Initiative in 1987. Through this initiative, she became a pioneer for the global maternal health movement, and instrumental for making the issue a priority when it comes to international social justice and human rights. Since her attachment to the WHO, she has worked as an international consultant within maternal health and safe motherhood.

As a researcher, Kwast has focused on midwifery and causes of maternal deaths. This research has according to the UNFPA contributed to significantly reducing the maternal mortality rates.
