= Samuel Merriman (1731–1818) =

English physician

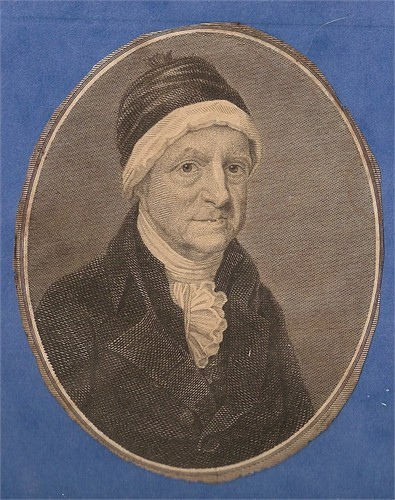
- Born: 29 December 1731; Marlborough, Wiltshire
- Died: 17 August 1818 (aged 86)
- Occupation: Physician

Samuel Merriman (29 December 1731 – 17 August 1818) was an English physician.

== Biography ==
Merriman was born on 29 December 1731 at Marlborough, Wiltshire, was third son of Nathaniel Merriman, grocer there, by his wife Elizabeth Hawkes. Being intended for the medical profession he was sent to Edinburgh in 1748, and graduated there as M.D. in 1753, his thesis ‘De Conceptu,’ 8vo, Edinburgh, 1753, being of so much value that it was reprinted by William Smellie in the second volume of his ‘Thesaurus Medicus’ (1779). Merriman first settled as a physician in Bristol, and afterwards removed to Andover, Hampshire; but coming to London in April 1757, he commenced practice in Queen Street, Mayfair, as an apothecary or general practitioner, in partnership with Oakley Halford, who was about to retire. He remained an apothecary for about twenty years, when he acted on his diploma, and practised only as a physician, finally retiring in 1812. His speciality was midwifery. The number of labours which he attended amounted to rather more than ten thousand; in one year alone he attended 362. His leisure was devoted to literature and biblical studies.

Merriman died at his son-in-law's house, 26 Half Moon Street, on 17 August 1818. In 1753 he married one of the daughters and coheiresses of William Dance, surgeon, of Marlborough, and by her, who died in 1780, he had fourteen children; of these one alone, Ann, wife of his nephew Samuel Merriman, survived him.

There is an excellent miniature of him painted by Richmond and engraved by Corner.
