= Midwife =

Medical professional who practices obstetrics as a health science

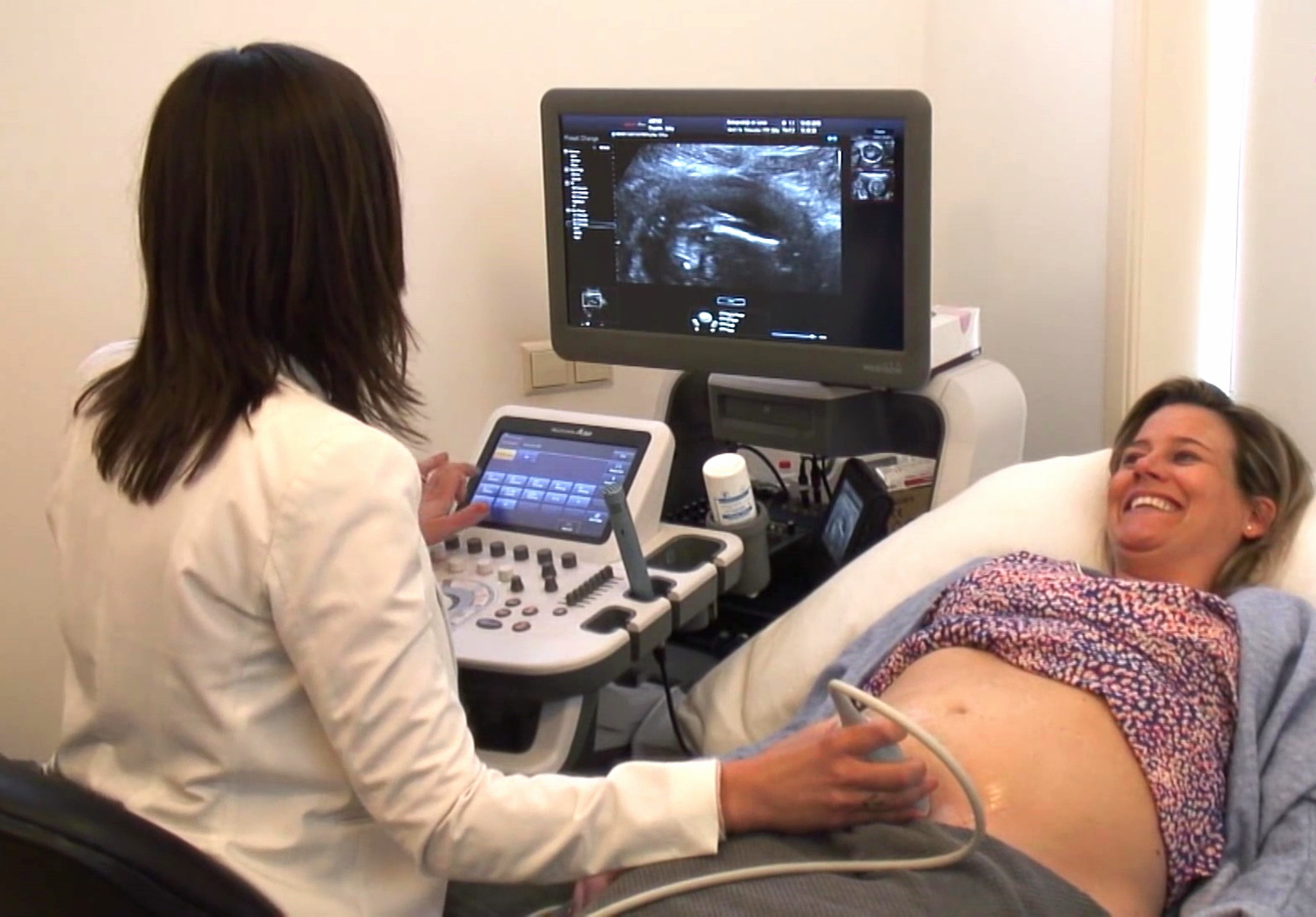
- A pregnant woman receives an ultrasound examination from a midwife sonographer

Occupation
- Names: Midwife
- Occupation type: Professional
- Activity sectors: Midwifery, obstetrics, newborn care, women's health, reproductive health

Description
- Competencies: Knowledge, professional behaviour and specific skills in family planning, pregnancy, labour, birth, postpartum period, newborn care, women's health, reproductive health, and social, epidemiologic and cultural context of midwifery
- Education required: Bachelor of Midwifery; Master of Midwifery
- Fields of employment: hospitals, clinics, health units, maternity units, birth facilities, private practices, home births, community, etc.
- Related jobs: obstetrician, gynecologist, paediatrician

A midwife (pl.: midwives) is a health professional who cares for mothers and newborns around childbirth, a specialisation known as midwifery.

The education and training for a midwife concentrates extensively on the care of women throughout their lifespan; concentrating on being experts in what is normal and identifying conditions that need further evaluation. In most countries, midwives are recognised as skilled healthcare providers. Midwives are trained to recognise variations from the normal progress of labour and understand how to deal with deviations from normal. They may intervene in high risk situations such as breech births, twin births, using non-invasive techniques. For complications related to pregnancy and birth that are beyond the midwife's scope of practice, including surgical and instrumental deliveries, they refer their patients to physicians or surgeons. In many parts of the world, these professions work in tandem to provide care to childbearing women. In others, only the midwife is available to provide care, and in yet other countries, many women elect to use obstetricians primarily over midwives.

Many developing countries are investing money and training for midwives, sometimes by retraining those people already practicing as traditional birth attendants. Some primary care services are currently lacking, due to a shortage of funding for these resources.

== Definition and etymology ==
According to the definition of the International Confederation of Midwives, which has also been adopted by the World Health Organization and the International Federation of Gynecology and Obstetrics:

A midwife is a person who has successfully completed a midwifery education programme that is recognised in the country where it is located and that is based on the ICM Essential Competencies for Basic Midwifery Practice and the framework of the ICM Global Standards for Midwifery Education; who has acquired the requisite qualifications to be registered or legally licensed to practice midwifery and use the title midwife; and who demonstrates competency in the practice of midwifery.

The word derives from Middle English mid, "with", and wif, "woman", and thus originally meant "with-woman", that is, a woman who is with another woman and assists her in giving birth. The term "male midwife" is common parlance when referring to males who work as midwives.

In English, the noun midwife is gendered, and in most countries, the corresponding noun and practice is historically used for women (sometimes banned for men), while in English, the verb midwifery is also applied to men (e.g. Havelock Ellis is said to have midwifed bigamist Howard Hinton's aka John Weldon's twins in 1883; historically, assistance was done by relatives, even only husbands, while male midwifery, excluding relatives, being common in some cultures, dates back to the mid 1900s; for Semelai people women also practised it up to 1980, while by 1992 some areas had only male midwives, and later most areas had only male midwives).

The older Semelai word for midwife, mudem, "itself provides insight into the ritual role a midwife is expected to play. Mudem also meant, and continues to mean, 'circumcisor'."

== Scope of practice ==
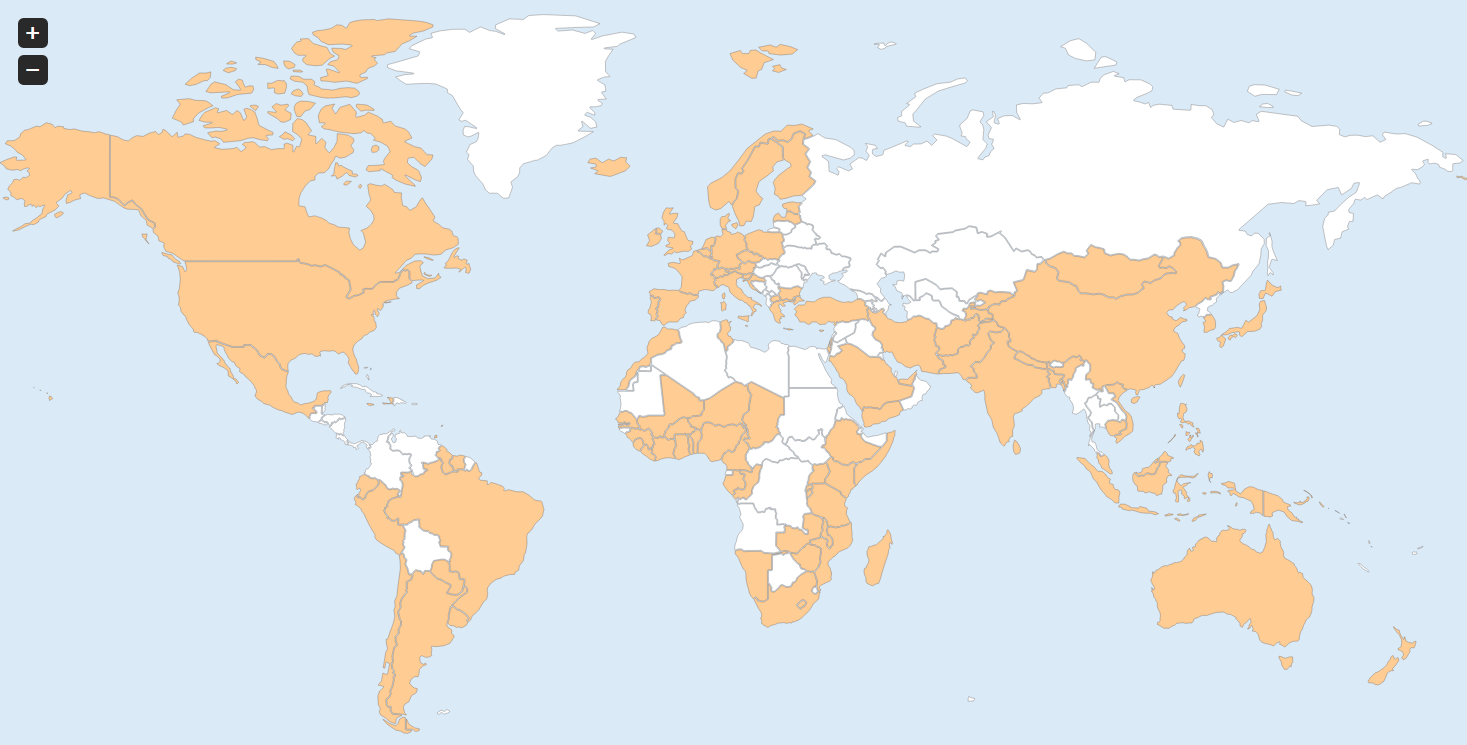
The 112 countries containing member associations of the International Confederation of Midwives (ICM) in 2017

The midwife has a certification and can either be a certified nurse midwife (CNM) or a certified professional midwife (CPM) and is recognized as a responsible and accountable professional who works in partnership with women to give necessary support preconception, during pregnancy, labor, and the postpartum period. When using a midwife preconception all the way through postpartum they give the best chance of increasing the mother and the infants health. They also provide care for the newborn and the infant up to a month after birth; this care includes preventative measures, the promotion of normal birth, the detection of complications in mother and child, perventing disease, the accessing of medical care and proscribing medicinces when needed or other appropriate assistance, and the carrying out of emergency measures.

The midwife has an important task in health counselling and education, not to be easily mistaken as a doula who also helps with education but mainly focuses on supporting the women both physically, with certain positions that make delivery more comfortable, or emotionally helping them remain calm and collected. Midwives educate both the woman giving birth, as well as the family and community. This work typically involves antenatal education and preparation for parenthood and may extend to the pregnant's health, sexual or reproductive health, and child care.

A midwife may practice in any setting, including the home, community, hospitals, clinics, or health units. Specific midwifery guides are made to help instruct midwives, which include material relating to prenatal and postnatal care. Midwifery guides are also written to be accessible to everyone, not just midwives.

== Education, training, regulation and practice ==
=== Australia ===
Education, training and regulation

The undergraduate midwifery programs are three-year full-time university programs leading to a bachelor's degree in midwifery (Bachelor of Midwifery) with additional one-year full-time programs leading to an honours bachelor's degree in midwifery (Bachelor of Midwifery (Honours)). The postgraduate midwifery programs (for registered midwives) lead to master's degrees in midwifery (Master in Midwifery, Master in Midwifery (Research), MSc Midwifery). There are also postgraduate midwifery programs (for registered nurses or paramedics who wish to become midwives) leading to a bachelor's degree or equivalent qualification in midwifery (Bachelor of Midwifery, Graduate Diploma in Midwifery).

Midwives in Australia must be registered with the Australian Health Practitioner Regulation Agency to practice midwifery, and use the title midwife or registered midwife.

Practice

Midwives work in a number of settings including hospitals, birthing centres, community centres and women's homes. They may be employed by health services or organisations, or self-employed as privately practising midwives. All midwives are expected to work within a defined scope of practice and conform to ongoing regulatory requirements that ensure they are safe and autonomous practitioners.

Professional associations/colleges

- Australian College of Midwives (ACM).

=== Canada ===
Midwifery was reintroduced as a regulated profession in most of Canada's ten provinces in the 1990s. Prior to this legalization, some midwives had practiced in a legal "grey area" in some provinces. In 1981, a midwife in British Columbia was charged with practicing without a medical license.

After several decades of intensive political lobbying by midwives and consumers, fully integrated, regulated and publicly funded midwifery is now part of the health system in the provinces of British Columbia (regulated since 1995), Alberta (regulated since 2000, fully funded since 2009) Saskatchewan (regulated since 1999), Manitoba (regulated since 1997), Ontario (regulated since 1991), Quebec (regulated since 1999), and Nova Scotia (regulated since 2006), and in the Northwest Territories (regulated since 2003) and Nunavut (regulated since 2008). In 2023, Midwifery is regulated in New Brunswick, Newfoundland and Labrador, Prince Edward Island and Yukon.

Education, training and regulation

The undergraduate midwifery programs are four-year full-time university programs leading to bachelor's degrees in midwifery (B.H.Sc. in Midwifery, Bachelor of Midwifery).

In British Columbia, the program is offered at the University of British Columbia. Mount Royal University in Calgary, Alberta offers a Bachelor of Midwifery program. In Ontario, the Midwifery Education Program (MEP) is offered by McMaster University and Toronto Metropolitan University and previously by Laurentian University. In Manitoba, the program is offered by the University of Manitoba and previously at the University College of the North. In Quebec, the program is offered at the Université du Québec à Trois-Rivières. In northern Quebec and Nunavut, Inuit women are being educated to be midwives in their own communities. There is also a programme for aboriginal midwives in Ontario. In Ontario, the Midwifey Act exempts Indigenous people from obtaining a four-year midwifery degree or registering with the College of Midwives of Ontario if they practice as midwife in their own community.

There are also three "bridging programs" for internationally educated midwives. The International Midwifery Pre-registration Program (IMPP) is a nine-month program offered by Toronto Metropolitan University in Ontario. The Internationally Educated Midwives Bridging Program (IEMBP) runs between 8 and 10 months at the University of British Columbia. At the Université du Québec à Trois-Rivières, French-speaking internationally trained midwives may earn the Certificat personnalisé en pratique sage-femme.

Midwives in Canada must be registered, after assessment by the provincial regulatory bodies, to practice midwifery, and use the title midwife, registered midwife or, the French-language equivalent, sage-femme.

Practice

From the original 'alternative' style of midwifery in the 1960s and 1970s, midwifery practice is offered in a variety of ways within regulated provinces: midwives offer continuity of care within small group practices, choice of birthplace, and a focus on the woman as the primary decision-maker in her maternity care. When women or their newborns experience complications, midwives work in consultation with an appropriate specialist. Registered midwives have access to appropriate diagnostics like blood tests and ultrasounds and can prescribe some medications. Founding principles of the Canadian model of midwifery include informed choice, choice of birthplace, continuity of care from a small group of midwives and respect for the mother as the primary decision maker. Midwives typically have hospital privileges, and support the woman's right to choose where she has her baby.

The legal recognition of midwifery has brought midwives into the mainstream of health care with universal funding for services, hospital privileges, rights to prescribe medications commonly needed during pregnancy, birth and postpartum, and rights to order blood work and ultrasounds for their own clients and full consultation access to physicians. To protect the tenets of midwifery and support midwives to provide woman-centered care, the regulatory bodies and professional associations have legislation and standards in place to provide protection, particularly for choice of birth place, informed choice and continuity of care. All regulated midwives have malpractice insurance. Any unregulated person who provides care with 'restricted acts' in regulated provinces or territories is practicing midwifery without a license and is subject to investigation and prosecution.

Prior to legislative changes, very few Canadian women had access to midwifery care, in part because it was not funded by the health care system. Legalizing midwifery has made midwifery services available to a wide and diverse population of women and in many communities, the number of available midwives does not meet the growing demand for services. Midwifery services are free to women living in provinces and territories with regulated midwifery.

Professional associations/colleges

- Canadian Association of Midwives (CAM).

==== British Columbia ====
On 16 March 1995, the BC government announced the approval of regulations that govern midwifery and establish the College of Midwives of BC. In 1996, the Health Professional Council released a draft of Bylaws for the College of Midwives of BC, which the Cabinet approved on 13 April 1997. In 1998, midwives were officially registered with the College of Midwives of BC.

In BC, midwives are primary care providers for women in all stages of pregnancy, from prenatal to six weeks postpartum. Midwives also care for newborns. The approximate proportion of women whose primary birth attendant was a midwife in British Columbia has been evaluated.

Midwives in BC can deliver natural births in hospitals or homes. If a complication arises in a pregnancy, labour, birth, or postpartum, a midwife consults with a specialist such as an obstetrician or paediatrician. Core competencies and restricted activities are included in the BC Health Professions Act Midwives Regulation. As of April 2009, the scope of practice for midwives allows them to prescribe certain prescription drugs, use acupuncture for pain relief, assist a surgeon in a caesarean section delivery and to perform a vacuum extraction delivery. These specialized practices require additional education and certification.

As of November 2015, the College of Midwives of British Columbia reported 247 General, 2 Temporary, 46 Non-practicing Registrant midwives. There were 2 midwives per 100,000 people in BC in 2006.

A midwife must register with the College of Midwives of BC to practice. To continue licensure, midwives must maintain regular recertification in neonatal resuscitation and management of maternal emergencies, maintain the minimum volume of clinical care (40 women), participate in peer case reviews and continuing education activities.

The University of British Columbia (UBC) has a four-year Bachelor of Midwifery program. The UBC midwifery program is poised to double in size thanks to an increase in government funding. Graduation of students will increase to 20 per year.

In terms of professional associations, BC has both the College of Midwives of BC and the Midwives Association of BC.

=== European Union ===
The qualification of midwife in the European Union is regulated by Directive 2005/36/EC.

==== France ====
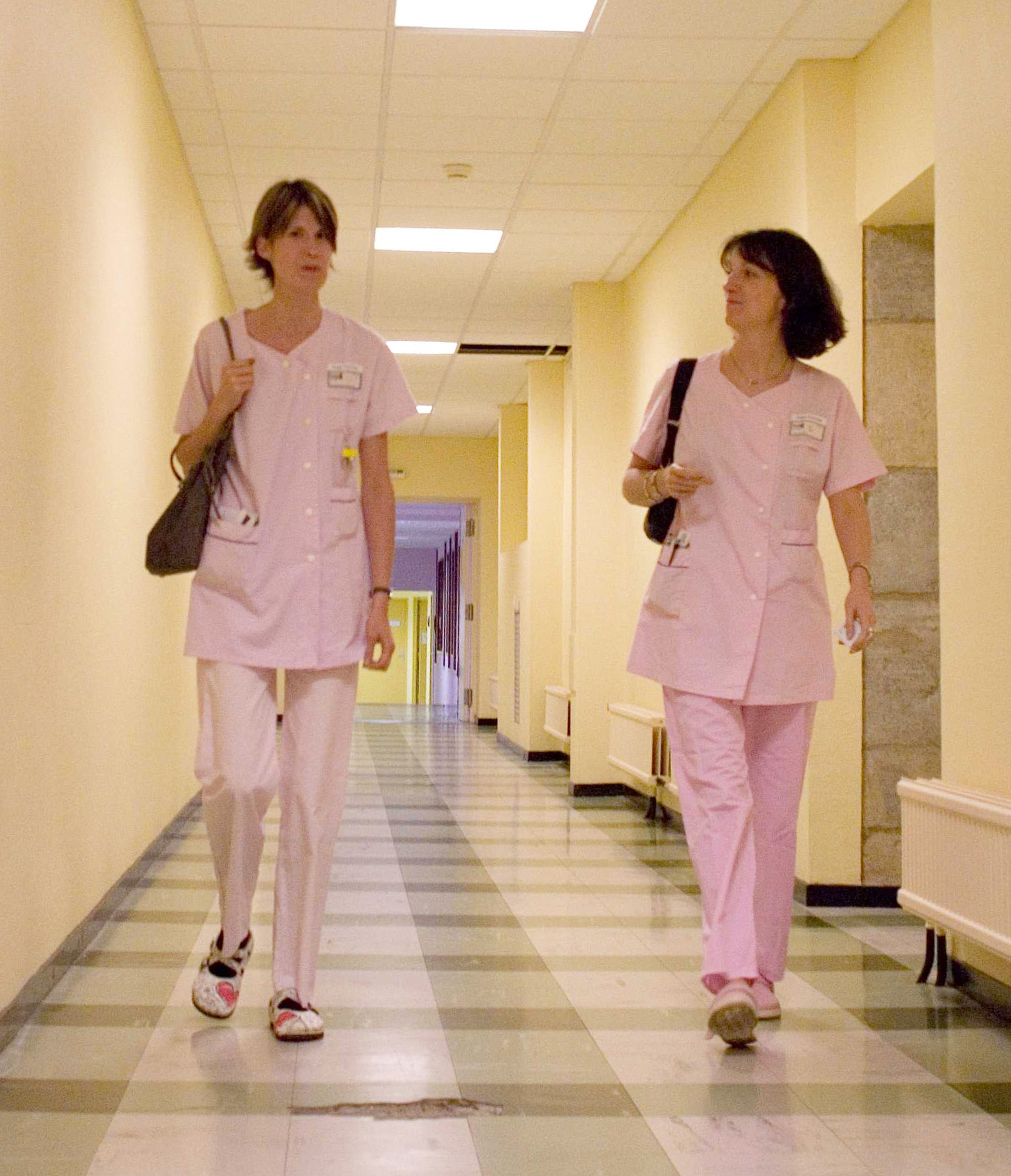
Two French midwives (sages-femmes)

Midwives (sage-femmes, literally meaning "wise-woman," or maïeuticien/maïeuticienne) are independent practitioners, specialists in birth and women's medicine.

Midwife studies last a minimum of five years.

Midwives in France must be registered with the Ordre des sages-femmes to practice midwifery and use the title sage-femme.

Professional associations/colleges:

- L'Ordre des Sages-Femmes, Conseil National (CNOSF).
- Collège National des Sages-Femmes de France (CNSF).
- Société Française de Maïeutique (SFMa).

==== Ireland ====
Education, training and regulation

The undergraduate midwifery programs are four-year full-time university programs, with an internship in the final year, leading to an honours bachelor's degree in midwifery (BSc (Hons) Midwifery). The postgraduate midwifery programs (for registered midwives) lead to master's degrees in midwifery (MSc Midwifery, MSc Midwifery Practice). There are also postgraduate midwifery programs (for registered general nurses who wish to become midwives) leading to a qualification in midwifery (Higher Diploma in Midwifery).

Midwives must be registered with the Nursing and Midwifery Board of Ireland (NMBI) to practice midwifery, and use the title midwife or registered midwife.

==== Netherlands ====
Education, training and regulation

The undergraduate midwifery programs are four-year full-time university programs leading to a bachelor's degree in midwifery (HBO-bachelor Verloskunde). There are four colleges for midwifery in the Netherlands: in Amsterdam, Groningen, Rotterdam and Maastricht. Midwives are called vroedvrouw (knowledge woman), vroedmeester (knowledge master, male), or verloskundige (deliverance experts) in Dutch.

Practice

Midwives are independent specialists in physiologic birth. In the Netherlands, home birth is still a common practice, although rates have been declining during the past decades. Between 2005 and 2008, 29% of babies were delivered at home. This figure fell to 23% delivered at home between 2007 and 2010 according to Midwifery in the Netherlands, a 2012 pamphlet by The Royal Dutch Organization for Midwives. In 2014 it has dropped further to 13.4%. perined.nl/jaarboek2104.pdf.

Midwives are generally organized as private practices, some of those are hospital-based. In-hospital outpatient childbirth is available in most hospitals. In this case, a woman's own midwife delivers the baby at the delivery room of a hospital, without intervention of an obstetrician. In all settings, midwives transfer care to an obstetrician in case of a complicated childbirth or need for emergency intervention.

Apart from childbirth and immediate postpartum care, midwives are the first line of care in pregnancy control and education of mothers-to-be. Typical information that is given to mothers includes information about food, alcohol, life style, travel, hobbies, sex, etc. Some midwifery practices give additional care in the form of preconceptional care and help with fertility problems.

All care by midwives is legal and it is totally reimbursed by all insurance companies. This includes prenatal care, childbirth (by midwives or obstetricians, at home or in the hospital), as well as postpartum/postnatal care for mother and baby at home.

Professional associations/colleges

- Royal Dutch Organisation of Midwives | Koninklijke Nederlandse Organisatie van Verloskundigen (KNOV).

=== Japan ===
Education, training and regulation

Midwifery was first regulated in 1868. Today midwives in Japan are regulated under the Act on Public Health Nurse, Midwife and Nurse (No. 203) established in 1948. Japanese midwives must pass a national certification exam. On 1 March 2003 the Japanese name of midwife officially converted to a gender neutral name. Still, only women can take the national midwife exam.

Professional associations/colleges

- Japanese Midwives Association (JMA).
- Japan Academy of Midwifery (JAM).
- Japanese Nursing Association (JNA), Midwives' Division.

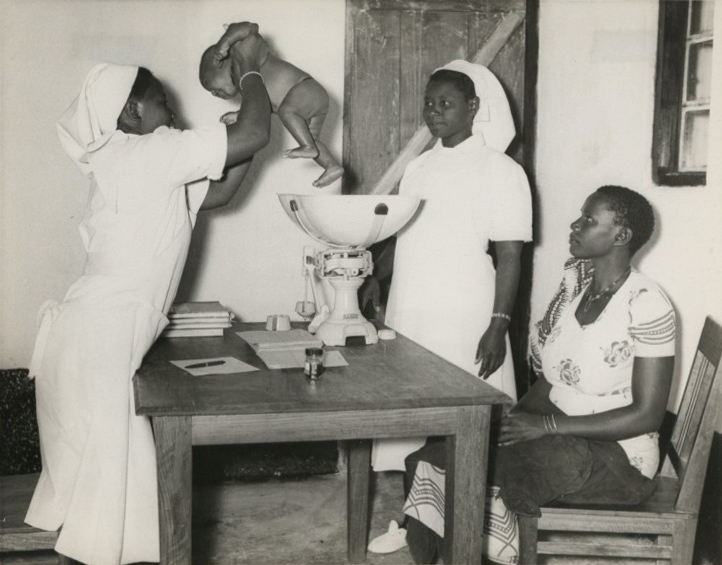
Tanzanian midwife weighing an infant and giving advice to the mother

=== Mozambique ===
When a 16-year civil war ended in 1992, Mozambique's health care system was devastated and one in ten women were dying in childbirth. There were only 18 obstetricians for a population of 19 million. In 2004, Mozambique introduced a new health care initiative to train midwives in emergency obstetric care in an attempt to guarantee access to quality medical care during pregnancy and childbirth. The newly introduced midwives system now perform major surgeries including caesareans and hysterectomies.

As the figures now stand, Mozambique is one of the few countries on track to achieve the MDG of reducing the maternal death rate by 75% by 2015.

=== New Zealand ===
Midwifery is a regulated profession with no connection to Nursing. Midwifery is a profession with a distinct body of knowledge and its own scope of practice, code of ethics and standards of practice. The midwifery profession has knowledge, skills and abilities to provide a primary complete maternity service to childbearing women on its own responsibility.

Education, training and regulation

The undergraduate midwifery programmes are three-year full-time (three trimesters per year) tertiary programmes leading to a bachelor's degree in midwifery (Bachelor of Midwifery or Bachelor of Health Science (Midwifery)). These programmes are offered by Otago Polytechnic in Dunedin, Ara Institute of Canterbury (formally CPIT) in Christchurch, Waikato Institute of Technology in Hamilton and Auckland University of Technology (AUT) in Auckland. Several schools have satellite programmes such as Otago with a programme in Southland, Wānaka, Wellington, Palmerston North, Whanganui, and Wairarapa – and AUT with student cohorts in various sites in the upper North Island. The postgraduate midwifery programmes (for registered midwives) lead to postgraduate degrees or equivalent qualifications in midwifery (Postgraduate Certificate in Midwifery, Postgraduate Diploma in Midwifery, Master of Midwifery, PhD Professional Doctorate).

The Midwifery First Year of Practice Programme (MFYP) is a compulsory national programme for all New Zealand registered midwifery graduates, irrespective of work setting. The New Zealand College of Midwives (the NZCOM) is contracted by the funder, Health Workforce New Zealand (HWNZ), to provide the programme nationally in accordance with the programme specification.

Midwives in New Zealand must be registered with the Midwifery Council of New Zealand to practice midwifery, and use the title midwife.

Practice

Women may choose a midwife, a General practitioner or an Obstetrician to provide their maternity care. About 78 percent choose a midwife (8 percent GP, 8 percent Obstetrician, 6 percent unknown). Midwives provide maternity care from early pregnancy to 6 weeks postpartum. The midwifery scope of practise covers normal pregnancy and birth. The midwife either consults or transfers care where there is a departure from a normal pregnancy. Antenatal care is normally provided in clinics, and postnatal care is initially provided in the woman's home. Birth can be in the home, a primary birthing unit, or a hospital. Midwifery care is fully funded by the Government. (GP care may be fully funded. Private obstetric care incurs a fee in addition to the government funding.)

Professional associations/colleges

- New Zealand College of Midwives.

=== Somalia ===
Increase in midwifery education has led to advances in impoverished countries. In Somalia, 1 in 14 women die while giving birth. Senior reproductive and maternal health adviser at UNFPA, Achu Lordfred claims, "the severe shortage of skilled health personnel with obstetric and midwifery skills means the most have their babies delivered by traditional birth attendants. But, when complications arise, these women either die or develop debilitating conditions, such as obstetric fistula, or lose their babies." UNFPA is striving to change these odds by opening seven midwifery schools and training 125 midwives so far.

Education, training and regulation

Though Somalia has a shortage of healthcare personnel and education, their midwifery programs are becoming more and more distinguished. A curriculum for midwifery has been approved by the international confederation of midwives which has been standardized among schools, something rare for this natural remedy focused country. This has been backed by the UNFPA in hopes to make more standardized healthcare education in the future.

=== South Africa ===
Education, training and regulation

Training includes aspects of midwifery, general nursing, community nursing and psychiatry, and can be achieved as either a four-year degree or a four-year diploma.

- Advanced Diploma in Midwifery: Holders of this qualification are eligible to register with the SANC as midwives. Assessments are conducted in line with the assessment policy of the Regulations Relating to the Accreditation of Institutions as Nursing Education Institutions (NEI). This qualification allows international employability.
- Postgraduate Diploma in Midwifery: The Postgraduate Diploma articulates with a master's degree in Nursing at NQF level 9. This qualification allows international employability.
- Bachelor's Degree in Nursing and Midwifery: Holders of this qualification are eligible for registration with the SANC as a Professional Nurse and Midwife. This qualification allows international employability.

The midwifery profession is regulated under the Nursing Act, Act No 3 of 2005. The South African Nursing Council (SANC) is the regulatory body of midwifery in South Africa.

Professional associations/colleges

- The Society of Midwives of South Africa (SOMSA).

=== Tanzania ===
Education, training and regulation

There are different levels of education for midwives:

- Certificate in Midwifery
- Diploma in Midwifery
- Advanced Diploma in Midwifery
- Bachelor of Science in Midwifery (BScM)
- Master of Science in Midwifery (MScM)

Midwives must be licensed by the Tanzania Nursing and Midwifery Council (TNMC) to practice as a 'registered midwife' or 'enrolled midwife'. TNMC ensure the quality midwifery education output, develop and reviews various guidelines and standards on midwifery professionals and monitor their implementation, monitor and evaluate midwifery education programs and approve such programs to meet the Council and international requirements. Also it establish standards of proficiencies for midwifery education.

Professional associations/colleges

- Tanzania Midwives Association (TAMA).

=== United Kingdom ===
Education, training and regulation

The undergraduate midwifery programs are three-year full-time university programs leading to honours bachelor's degrees in midwifery: BSc (Hons) Midwifery, Bachelor of Midwifery (Hons). The postgraduate midwifery programs (for registered midwives) lead to master's degrees in midwifery (MSc Midwifery, MSc Advanced Practice Midwifery). There are also undergraduate and postgraduate midwifery programs (for graduates with a relevant degree who wish to become midwives) leading to degrees or equivalent qualifications in midwifery (BSc (Hons) Midwifery, Bachelor of Midwifery (Hons), Graduate Diploma in Midwifery, Postgraduate Diploma in Midwifery, MSc Midwifery). Midwifery training consists of classroom-based learning provided by select universities in conjunction with hospital- and community-based training placements at NHS Trusts.

Midwifery students in England and Wales now pay tuition fees following the abolition of free tuition and the NHS bursary system for most pre-registration healthcare degree programmes in the UK. Funding varies depending on the UK country. For example, there are no tuition fees in Scotland for those that meet eligibility criteria. Short course students, who are already registered adult nurses, have different funding arrangements, with a diminishing number being employed by the local NHS Trust via the Strategic Health Authority (SHA), and are paid salaries. This varies, however, between universities and SHAs, with some students being paid their pre-training salaries, while others are employed as a Band 5 and still others are paid a proportion of a Band 5 salary. However, alterations to short course commissioning and funding is changing at the present time, with more and more short course students are being expected to self-fund in full or, at least, in part. For example, a short course student midwife who also holds registration as an adult nurse may be required to self-fund tuition, either via their own private funds, or via the student loan system while still receiving a salary – or be expected to self-fund completely throughout their entire course of study.

Pre-registration midwifery training via the short course is, at present, only an option to those holding registration as an adult nurse (RN – Adult, RGN, or RNA). Mental Health Nurses (RMNs), Children's Nurses (RN – Child or Children / RSCNs) and Learning Disability Nurses (RNLDs) would need to complete the full three-or-four-year programme depending on their choice of university.

Midwives must be registered with the Nursing and Midwifery Council to practice midwifery and use the title 'midwife' or 'registered midwife', and must also have a Supervisor of Midwives through their local supervising authority.

Practice

Midwives are practitioners in their own right in the United Kingdom. They take responsibility for the antenatal, intrapartum and postnatal care of women up until 28 days after the birth, or as required thereafter. Midwives are the lead health care professional attending the majority of births, whether at home, in a midwife-led unit or in a hospital (although most births in the UK occur in hospitals).

In December 2014 the National Institute for Health and Care Excellence updated its guidance regarding where women should give birth. The new guidance states that midwife-led units are safer than hospitals for women having straightforward (low risk) pregnancies. Its updated guidance also confirms that home birth is as safe as birth in a midwife-led unit or a traditional labour ward for the babies of low-risk pregnant women who have already had at least one child previously.

Many midwives also work in the community. The role of community midwives includes making initial appointments with pregnant women, managing clinics, undertaking postnatal care in the home and attending home births. A community midwife typically has a pager, is responsible for a particular area and can be contacted by ambulance control when needed. Sometimes they are paged to help out in a hospital when there are insufficient midwives available.

Most midwives work within the National Health Service, providing both hospital and community care, but a significant proportion work independently, providing total care for their clients within a community setting. However, recent government proposals to require insurance for all health professionals is threatening independent midwifery in England.

Midwives are responsible for the women they are caring for. They refer complications to medical staff, act as the women's advocate, and ensure that mothers retain choice and control over childbirth.

Most practising midwives in the United Kingdom are female: men account for less than 0.5 per cent of midwives on the register of the Nursing and Midwifery Council.

Professional associations/colleges

- Royal College of Midwives (RCM).
- Independent Midwives UK (IMUK).
- Association of Radical Midwives (ARM).

=== United States ===
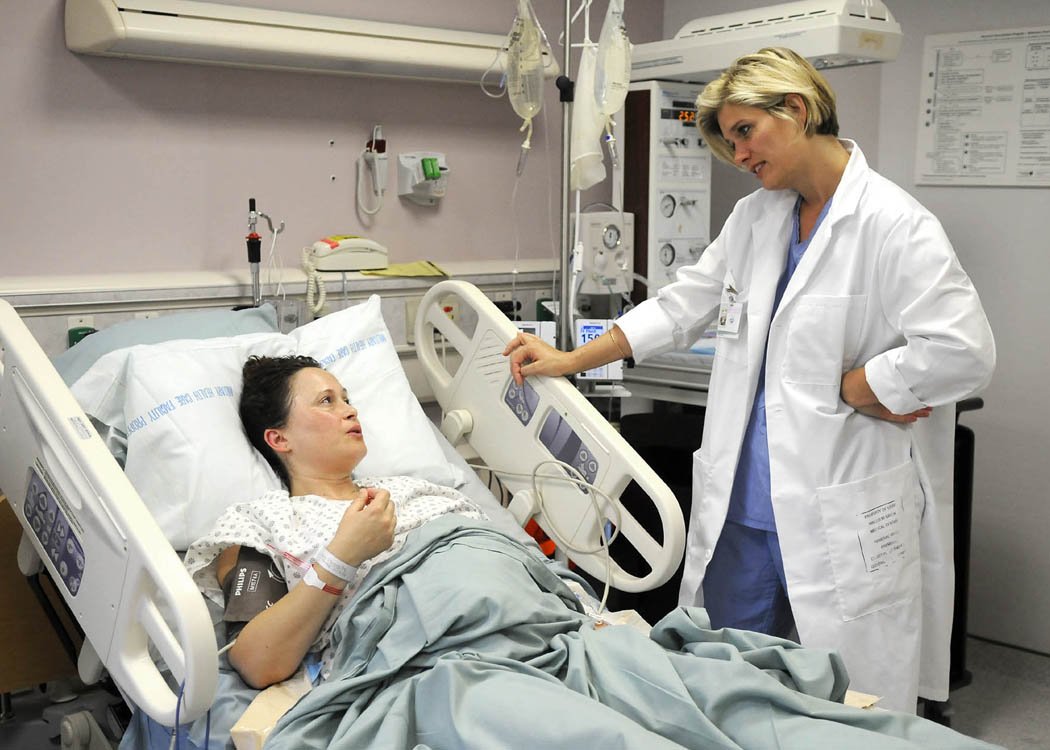
US Navy midwife checks on a woman

Education, training and regulation

Accredited midwifery programs can lead to different professional midwifery credentials:

- Midwifery programs, accredited by the Midwifery Education Accreditation Council (MEAC), leading to the Certified Professional Midwife (CPM) credential, certified by the North American Registry of Midwives (NARM), that is at the level of a degree in midwifery (AS Midwifery, BSc Midwifery, MSc Midwifery). Completion of a Portfolio Evaluation Process (PEP) or a state licensure program are considered. CPMs have to apply for recertification every three years.
- Midwifery programs (for graduates with a relevant degree who wish to become midwives), accredited by the Accreditation Commission for Midwifery Education (ACME), leading to the Certified Nurse Midwife (CNM) and Certified Midwife (CM) credentials, certified by the American Midwifery Certification Board (AMCB), that are at the level of a bachelor's degree or equivalent qualification in midwifery (BSc Midwifery). CNMs and CMs must apply for recertification every five years.

According to each US state, a midwife must be licensed and/or authorized to practice midwifery.

Practice

Midwives work with women and their families in many settings. They generally support and encourage natural childbirth in all practice settings. Laws regarding who can practice midwifery and in what circumstances vary from state to state. Many states have birthing centers where a midwife may work individually or as a group, which provides additional clinical opportunities for student midwives.

CPMs provide on-going care throughout pregnancy and continuous, hands-on care during labor, birth, and the immediate postpartum period. They practice as autonomous health professionals working in a network of relationships with other maternity-care professionals who can provide consultation and collaboration, when needed. Although qualified to practice in any setting, they have particular expertise in providing care in homes and free-standing birth centers, and own or work in over half of the birth centers in the U.S. today.

CNMs and CMs work in a variety of settings including private practices, hospitals, birth centers, health clinics, and home birth services. They supervise not only pregnancy, delivery, and postpartum period care for those who were pregnant and their newborns, but also provide gynecological care for all women who need it and have autonomy and prescriptive authority in most states. They manage biological females' healthcare from puberty through post-menopause. With appropriate training, they can also first-assist in cesarean (operative) deliveries and perform limited ultrasound examinations. It is possible for CNMs/CMs to practice independently of physicians, establishing themselves as health care providers in the community of their choice.

Professional associations/colleges

- Midwives Alliance of North America (MANA).
- National Association of Certified Professional Midwives (NACPM).
- American College of Nurse-Midwives (ACNM).

== Men in midwifery ==
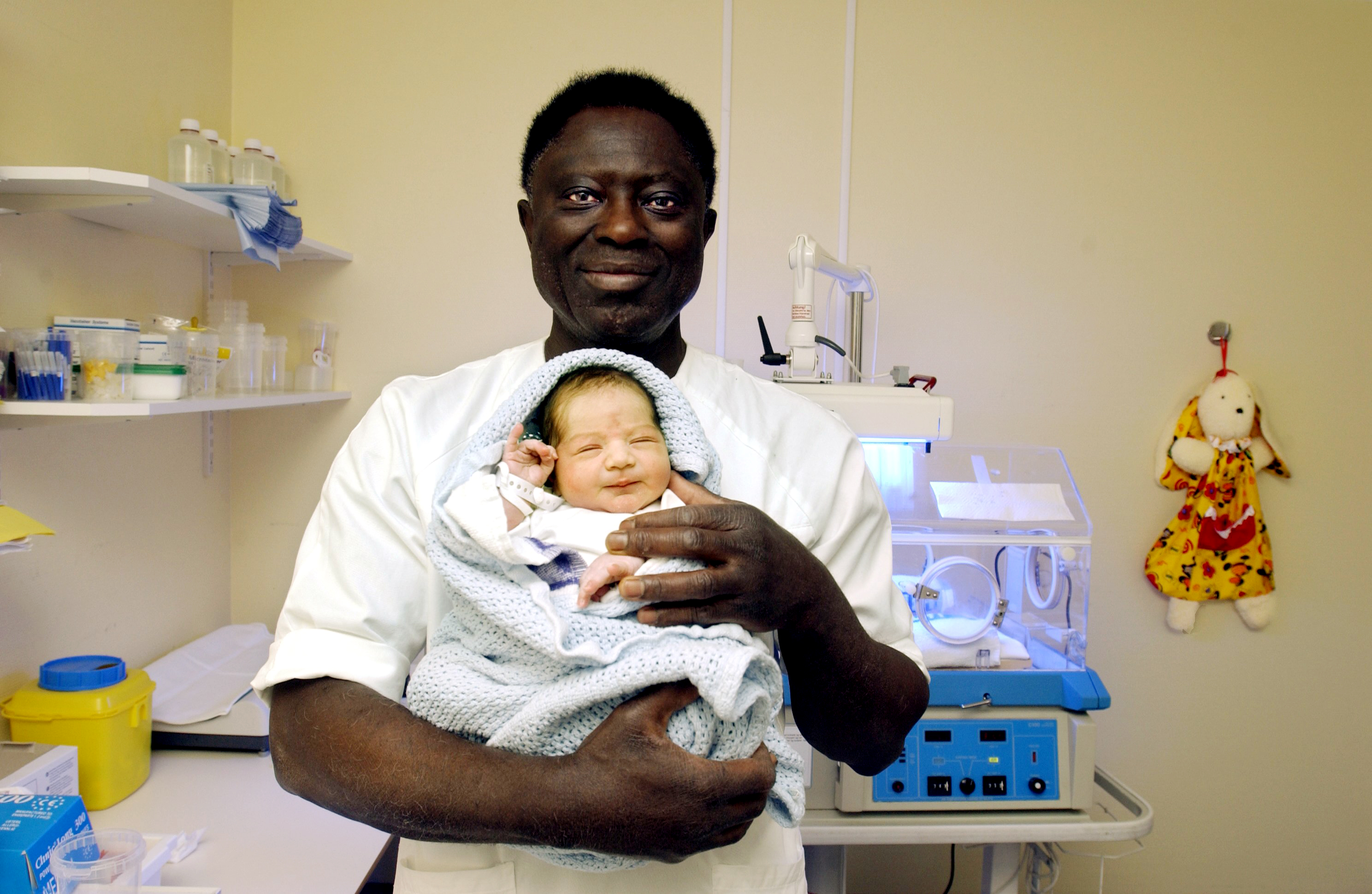
A male midwife in Oslo, Norway

For cultural and historical reasons, men rarely practice midwifery. In ancient Greece, midwives were required by law to have given birth themselves, which prevented men from joining their ranks. Julian Clement is often attributed to being the first male midwife, after he attended to Madame de la Valerie in France in 1663. In 17th century Europe, some barber surgeons, all of whom were male, specialized in births, especially births requiring the use of surgical instruments. This eventually developed into a professional split, with women serving as midwives and men becoming obstetricians. Men who work as midwives are called midwives (or male midwives, if it is necessary to identify them further) or accoucheurs; the term midhusband is occasionally encountered, mostly as a joke. In previous centuries, they were called man-midwives in English.

William Smellie is credited with innovations on the shape of forceps. This invention corresponds with the development towards obstetrics. He advised male midwives to wear dresses to reduce controversy over having a man present at birth.

As of the 21st century, most developed countries allow men to train as midwives. However, it remains very rare. In the United Kingdom, even after the passing of the Sex Discrimination Act 1975, the Royal College of Midwives barred men from the profession until 1983. As of March 2016, there were between 113 and 137 registered male midwives, representing 0.6% of all practising midwives in the UK. In various other countries, 2024 data shows higher percentages of male midwives, including 10% in Spain and Chile, 33% in Ethiopia and 50% in Burundi.

In the US, there remain a small, stable or minimally declining number of male midwives with full scope training (CNMs/CMs), comprising approximately 1% of the membership of the American College of Nurse-Midwives.

In the myth of some cultures that "men lost their ability to give birth and subsequently became midwives". In some Southeast Asian cultures, e.g. with the Semelai people (also e.g. in some Sudanese cultures), some or even most of the midwives are men; and the women no longer consider themselves "brave enough" (historically men and women worked as midwives, and there are no formal prohibitions, for either gender).

== History ==
=== Medieval Europe ===
In medieval Europe, it was not necessary for midwives to be literate. Several women were midwives in medieval England. Often they could be married to male medical practitioners. Pierrette de Bouvile the sworn midwife in the 1460s in the village of Arpajon south of Paris, she was married to a churchwarden. Asseline Alexandre, a woman who attended the births of the Duchess of Burgundy in the 1370s, was not married to a physician, but she was married to a bourgeois of Paris.

=== Ming China ===
A midwife in Ming China had to be female, and had to be familiar with the female body and the process of childbirth. The sexual limitation in midwifery was strict due to strict sex segregation, which was common in the Ming dynasty. Males were not allowed to see or touch a female's body directly. In this situation, male physicians played only a minor role in childbirth. They were usually responsible for only antenatal examinations and body check-ups before and after the baby was born, but never participated in the delivery room. The skill set in midwifery was also different from medicine.

Women who wanted to be a midwife could only learn the skill from experts because there was no literature about midwifery. To serve in the Forbidden City as a midwife, applicants had to apply through the Lodge of Ritual and Ceremony ("Lodge") (Li-I fang), which was also called the Bureau of Nursing Children (Nai-tzu fu). Pregnant women outside the palace were likely to pay more to hire "palace midwifes" than "folk midwifes".

==== Responsibility ====
A midwife's responsibilities could include criminal investigations, especially those that involved women. They consulted in investigations of rape cases and determination on a female's virginity because they were the society's top specialists in sexual medicine. Midwives were sometimes assigned to inspect female healers selected by the Lodge, to make sure they were healthy.

During the process of childbirth, they cleaned the byproducts from abortions, miscarriages and stillbirths. Such work was considered "pollution" during the Ming dynasty.

Infanticide, particularly of newborn baby girls, was part of family planning in Ming times. Midwives and their knowledge of infanticide played important roles in this custom. When a baby was born, the midwife inspected the baby and determined its gender. If it was a female infant, the midwife asked the mother if she wanted to keep it or not. If not, the midwife used her professional knowledge to kill the baby in the simplest and most silent way and then ask for payment. Even if the decision was not made by the midwife, she had to kill the baby because she was the only one who had ability to do so in the delivery room. Moreover, they were also considered as "merchants" of body parts. They were also responsible for disposing waste from the process of childbirth, which consisted of body parts from the placenta. Therefore, they could easily sell them to others secretly to earn additional income.

==== Public perception ====
The dirty work and knowledge mentioned above had a negative impact on the public attitude toward midwives. Some writers then described the midwife as a second or vicious character in their stories due to a midwife's guilty knowledge. Midwives were also labeled as one of "six grannies". This term was originally established by scholars and officials. Over time, male physicians also blamed midwives for the same reason. Although midwives dominated the field and had extensive experience in childbirth, they did not have equivalent participation on elite medical literature. Oppositely, elite medical literature are dominated by male physicians, although who contributed much less in childbirth process. Elders and male physicians also disparaged midwives' knowledge about the female body and the process of childbirth. Male physicians even established a boundary between their learned pharmaceutical knowledge as opposite to the midwife's manual manipulations. They did not consider midwives as professionals that required expertise because their skill was not learned from scholarly literature. They believed the midwife's existence was due to gender segregation, and it limited the male physician's role in childbirth.

== Notable midwives ==
- Louise Boursier
- Marie-Rosalie Cadron-Jetté
- Angélique du Coudray
- Yvonne Cryns
- Charlotte Führer
- Ina May Gaskin
- Barbara Kwast
- Ronnie Lichtman
- Onnie Lee Logan
- Emmi Mäkelin
- Juana Miranda
- Zeinebou Mint Taleb Moussa
- Elizabeth Nihell
- Justine Siegemund
- Margaret Stephen
- Jennifer Worth
- Martha Ballard
- Allyson Williams (midwife)

== Midwives in culture ==
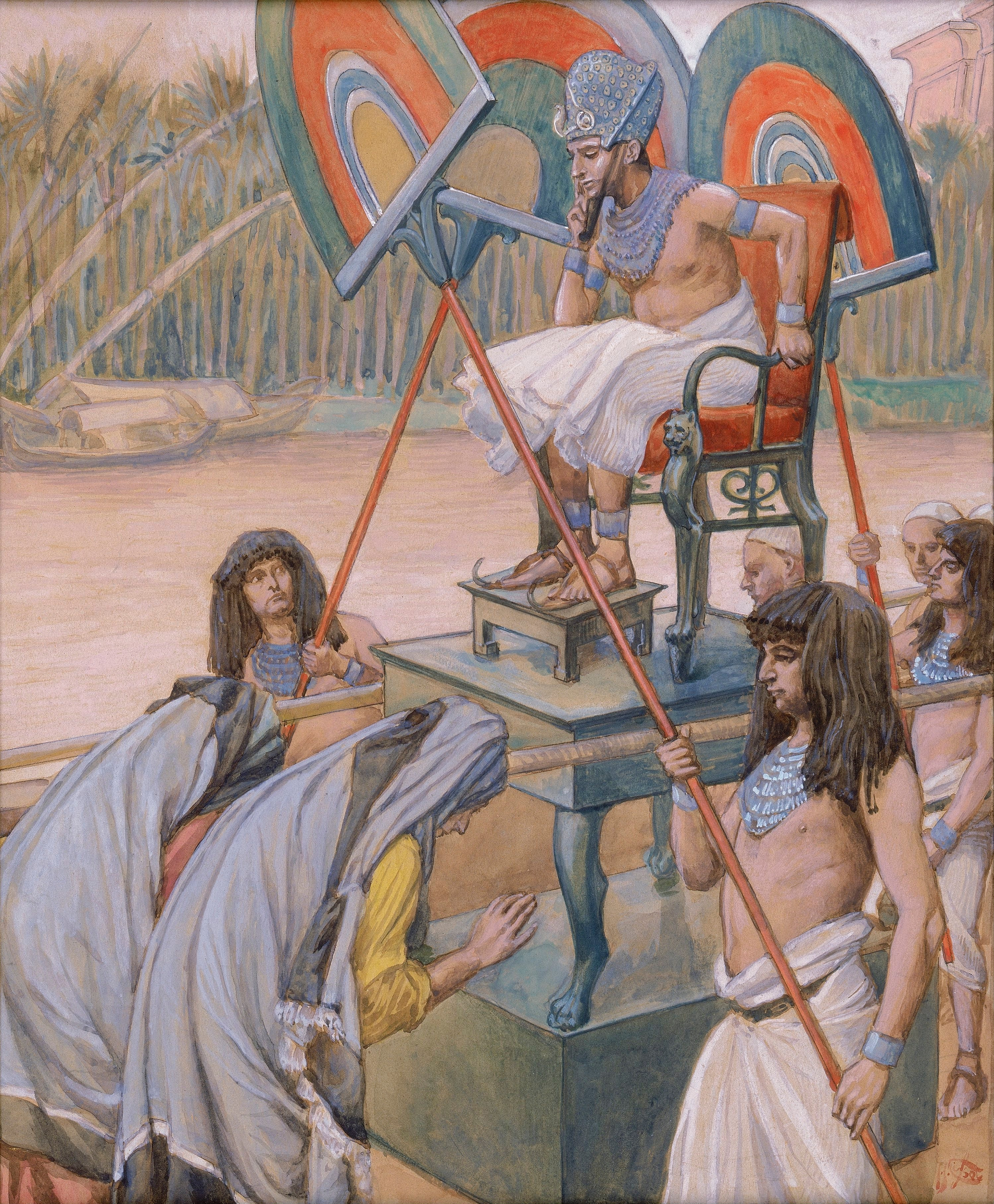
Pharaoh and the Midwives, James Tissot c. 1900

Shiphrah and Puah are two midwives in the Book of Exodus (6th–5th century BC). They are noted for disobeying the Pharaoh's command to kill all new-born Hebrew boys.

Laurel Thatcher Ulrich's A Midwife's Tale (1990) is a biography of Martha Ballard, a midwife in the late 1700s to early 1800s who faces countless challenges in her career and home life. Each of the book's chapters feature excerpts from Ballard's historical diary followed by Ulrich's discussions of different aspects of her life. The diary highlights the amount of births that Martha attends to in her life and how they are performed and paid for.

Midwives is a 1997 novel by Chris Bohjalian. A midwife is arrested and tried when a woman in her care dies. It was selected for Oprah's Book Club and became a New York Times Best Seller. The TV film Midwives (2001) was based on it.

Call the Midwife (2012) is a drama series based on novels by Jennifer Worth. It features midwives working in the East End of London 1950–1960.

The Midwife (Sage femme, 2017) is a film drama about Claire, a midwife, and her late father's eccentric former mistress.

== See also ==
- Direct-entry midwife
- Doula
- International Midwives' Day
- Obstetrician-gynecologist
