= Samuel Merriman (1771–1852) =

English physician

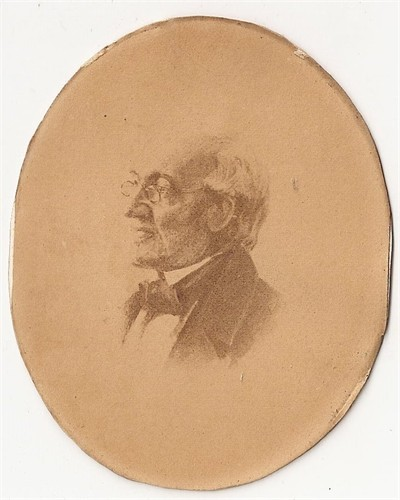
- Born: 25 October 1771; Marlborough, Wiltshire
- Died: 22 November 1852 (aged 81)
- Occupation: Physician

Samuel Merriman (25 October 1771 – 22 November 1852) was an English physician.

== Biography ==
Merriman born on 25 October 1771 at Marlborough, Wiltshire, was son of Benjamin (1722–1781), who was eldest son of Nathaniel Merriman of the same place. Samuel's great-grandfather, another Nathaniel, was youngest son of John Merriman (1618–1670), a captain in the army of Cromwell (Waylen, Hist. of Marlborough; Rushworth, Hist. Coll. vii. 1351; Grove, Antiquities of Carisbrook Castle, 1 Dec. 1648; Whitelocke, Memorials). His mother, who was his father's second wife, was Mary, eldest daughter of William Hawkes of Marlborough, and niece to Sir Michael Foster the judge. The father Benjamin had a large brewery in Marlborough. He was a man of scientific pursuits, and the author of political and other essays, some of which were inserted in the ‘Gentleman's Magazine.’ He likewise received medals from the Society of Arts and the Bath Agricultural Society for inventing various machines. Samuel was sent to Marlborough free school, of which in 1783 he was head-boy. In 1784 he arrived in London, and studied medicine under his uncle, Dr. Samuel Merriman. After hearing the lectures of Matthew Baillie and William Cumberland Cruikshank at the Anatomical Theatre in Great Windmill Street he attended in 1795 the midwifery lectures of Dr. Thynne and the Westminster Lying-in Hospital, but his clinical knowledge of disease was principally obtained by seeing the numerous patients of his cousin William (1766–1800), son of the elder Samuel Merriman. In 1807, having become a member of the Society of Apothecaries, he entered into partnership with Mr. Peregrine, to whom he soon resigned the general practice, limiting himself to midwifery alone. In 1808 he was appointed physician-accoucheur to the Westminster General Dispensary, having previously received the honorary degree of M.D. from Marischal College, Aberdeen, for which he was specially examined in London by Dr. Vaughan (afterwards Sir Henry Halford). He resigned the office in 1815, and was appointed consulting physician-accoucheur and subsequently vice-president of the charity. On 17 August 1809 he was elected to the like office at the Middlesex Hospital, where in 1810 he commenced his annual course of lectures on midwifery, and continued them regularly till 1825. In 1822, when his consultation practice as a physician for the diseases of women and children had largely increased, he removed to Brook Street, Grosvenor Square, and he subsequently purchased an estate at Rodborne Cheney, Wiltshire. Merriman resigned his post at the Middlesex Hospital on 7 March 1826, but continued to take a warm interest in the institution, and was one of the treasurers from 1840 until 1845. Of the Royal Medical and Chirurgical Society he was elected treasurer in 1837.

Merriman died in Brook Street on 22 November 1852. He married in 1799 Ann (1778–1831), only surviving daughter of his uncle, Samuel Merriman. Their children were two daughters and a son, Samuel William John Merriman, M.D. (1814–1873), consulting physician to the Westminster General Dispensary (1847), physician to the Royal Infirmary for Children (1849), and author of ‘Arguments against the Indiscriminate Use of Chloroform in Midwifery,’ 8vo, London, 1848, and other treatises.

Merriman published in 1805 a pamphlet in vindication of vaccination entitled ‘Observations on some late Attempts to Depreciate the Value and Efficacy of Vaccine Inoculation.’ He had taken up his pen to prove the superior excellence of the smallpox inoculation, but as he wrote he found his arguments untenable. Essays and other papers of his were published in the ‘London Medical Repository,’ the ‘London Medical and Physical Journal,’ and the ‘Medico-Chirurgical Transactions,’ but the medical works for which he was best known were his ‘Synopsis of the Various Kinds of Difficult Parturition,’ 12mo, London, 1814, which passed through several editions, and was translated into Italian, German, and French, and his edition of Dr. M. Underwood's ‘Treatise on the Diseases of Children,’ 8vo, London, 1827. During his tenure of office as examiner to the Society of Apothecaries (1831–7) he published in 1833, under the title of ‘The Validity of “Thoughts on Medical Reform,”’ an answer to a pamphlet of that title written, as was understood, by John Allen, M.D. He also wrote a ‘Dissertation on the Retroversion of the Womb,’ 8vo, London, 1810.

Merriman illustrated with anecdotes his copies of ‘A Picture of the College of Physicians’ and Wadd's ‘Nugæ Chirurgicæ.’ He had also a fine collection of portraits of medical men. Philological subjects much interested him. To the ‘Gentleman's Magazine’ and ‘Notes and Queries,’ then recently established, he contributed articles of real value. For the ‘London Journal of Medicine’ he wrote an historical retrospect of the science and practice of medicine under the title of ‘The First of October 1851, by an Octogenarian.’

Several portraits of Merriman were taken at different periods, two of which only have been engraved—one a private plate.

His first cousin, John Merriman (1774–1839), surgeon, born on 26 Oct. 1774 at Marlborough, was son of Nathaniel Merriman by his wife Elizabeth, daughter of Thomas Baverstock of Alton, Hampshire. In 1794 he came to London to complete his medical education, and was admitted member of the Royal College of Surgeons and of the Society of Apothecaries. He soon became associated in business at Kensington with Thomas Hardwick, whose niece Jane, daughter of John Hardwick of Weston, Herefordshire, he married. For many years he was general medical attendant on the Duchess of Kent, the Princess Victoria, and the Princess Sophia, at Kensington Palace; accordingly the Princess Victoria, as soon as she ascended the throne, conferred upon him and his two sons, John (1800–1881) and James Nathaniel (1806–1854), all of whom were in partnership at Kensington, the appointment of apothecary extraordinary to her majesty. He died on 17 June 1839 at Kensington Square (Gent. Mag. 1839, pt. ii. p. 204). His portrait was engraved by Newton from a painting by Lucas.
