= Angélique du Coudray =

French pioneering midwife (1714–1794)

Angélique Marguerite Le Boursier du Coudray
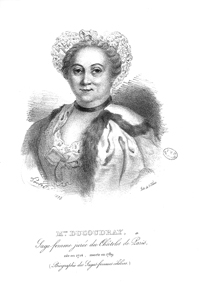
- Born: August 27, 1714; Paris, France
- Died: April 17, 1794; Bordeaux, France
- Education: École de Chirurgie, University of Paris
- Occupation: Midwife
- Employer: King Louis XV
- Known for: Midwifery, invention of the first lifesize obstetrical mannequin
- Notable work: Abrégé de l'art des accouchements (Abridgment of the Art of Delivery)

Angélique Marguerite Le Boursier du Coudray, generally known as Angélique du Coudray, (27 August 1714 – 17 April 1794) was an influential, pioneering French midwife. Gaining fame at a time when men were taking over the field, she rose from middle-class origins to become noticed and commissioned by King Louis XV himself.

In early 2026 it was announced that du Coudray was one of the 72 women to have their names added to the Eiffel Tower to join the 72 men already included.

== Early life and education ==
Angélique Marguerite Le Boursier du Coudray was born on 27 August 1714, probably in Paris.

In February 1740, at the age of 25, Angélique du Coudray completed a three-year apprenticeship with the experienced midwife Anne Bairsin, Dame Philibet Magin, and passed her qualifying examinations at the École de Chirurgie (School of Surgery) in Paris.

== Career ==
Within the next few years, the School of Surgery had barred female midwives from receiving instruction. After du Coudray demanded that the Faculty of Medicine of the University of Paris provide instructions to all midwives and midwifery students by signing a petition, she was accepted into the school.

In 1743, the status of surgeons, who were all male, was raised and they sought to extend their role into the field of midwifery through denying instruction to female midwives. Du Coudray and other female midwives signed a second petition and accused surgeons of neglecting their duties. She argued that by refusing to instruct female midwives, surgeons were allowing midwives to be improperly trained and so causing a shortage of officially accredited midwives. To prevent harm to patients, and to maintain their professional standing distinct from surgeons, the medical doctors continued to allow women to attend. After the situation was solved and all midwives received proper training, du Coudray became the head accoucheuse at the Hôtel Dieu in Paris. By guiding and leading in this political matter, she became a prominent figure in Paris.

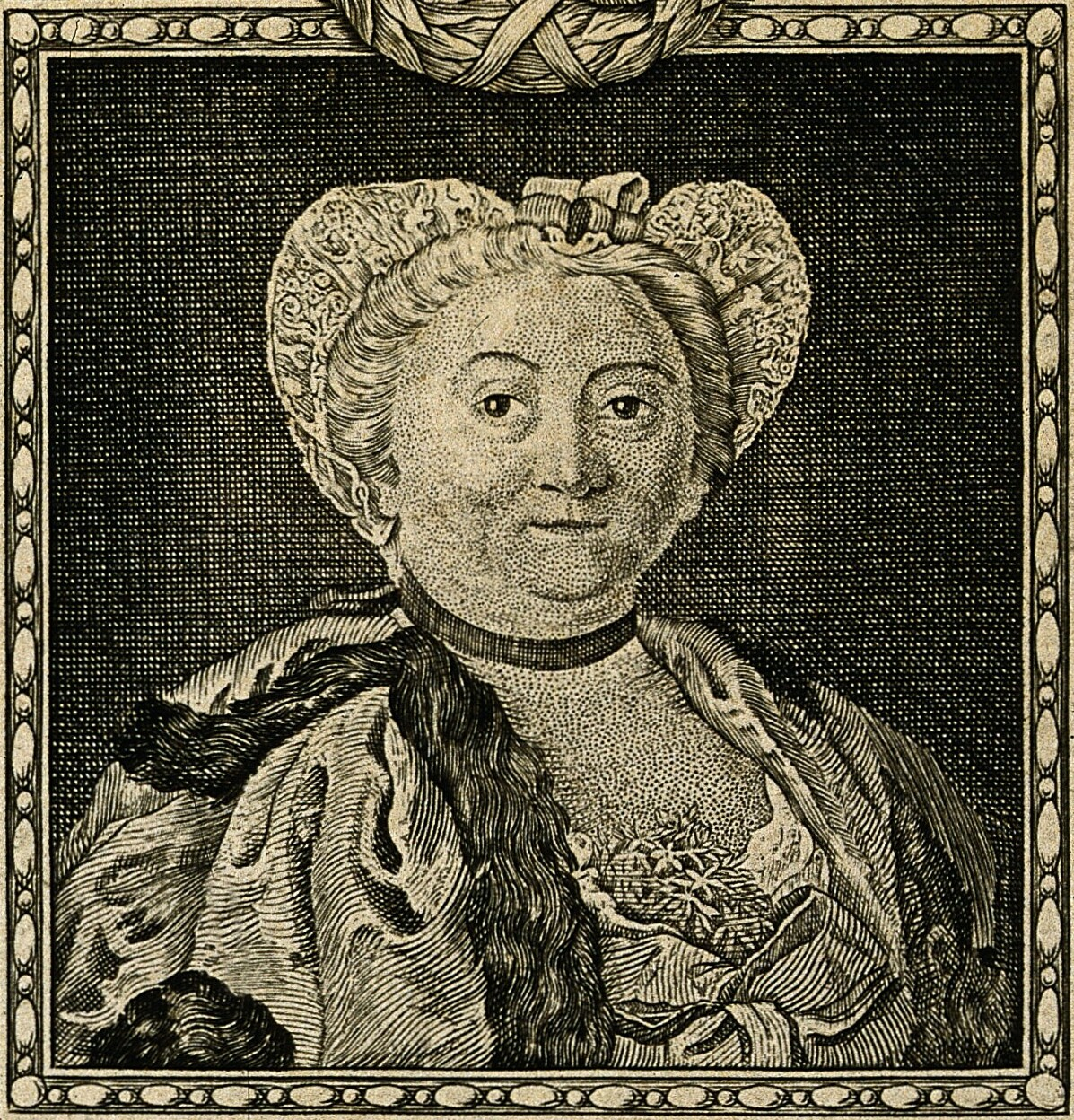
Angélique du Coudray: line engraving by J, Robert

In 1759, she published an early midwifery textbook, Abrégé de l'art des accouchements (Abridgment of the Art of Delivery), which was a revision and expansion of an earlier midwifery textbook published in 1667. The book was translated into many languages including German, Dutch, and English. The textbook provided du Coudray's illustrations to show important maneuvers as well as how dangerous the maneuvers were.

In the same year, King (Louis XV) commissioned her to teach midwifery to peasant women in an attempt to reduce infant mortality. This had become a political concern because a perceived high rural perinatal mortality, following from the deaths in the Seven Years' War, was depleting France of future citizens.

Between 1760 and 1783, she travelled all over rural France, sharing her extensive knowledge with poor women. During this period, she is estimated to have taught in over forty French cities and rural towns and to have trained 4,000 students directly. She was also responsible for the training of 6,000 other women, who were taught directly by her former students. In addition, she taught about 500 surgeons and physicians, all of them men. At one point in her travels, she taught midwifery to veterinarians at the Royal Veterinary Schoolin Lyon so that women in rural areas would have the necessary care. In her thirty years of teaching she taught over 30,000 students. Through this educational effort du Coudray became a national sensation and international symbol of French medical advancement.

== The Machine ==
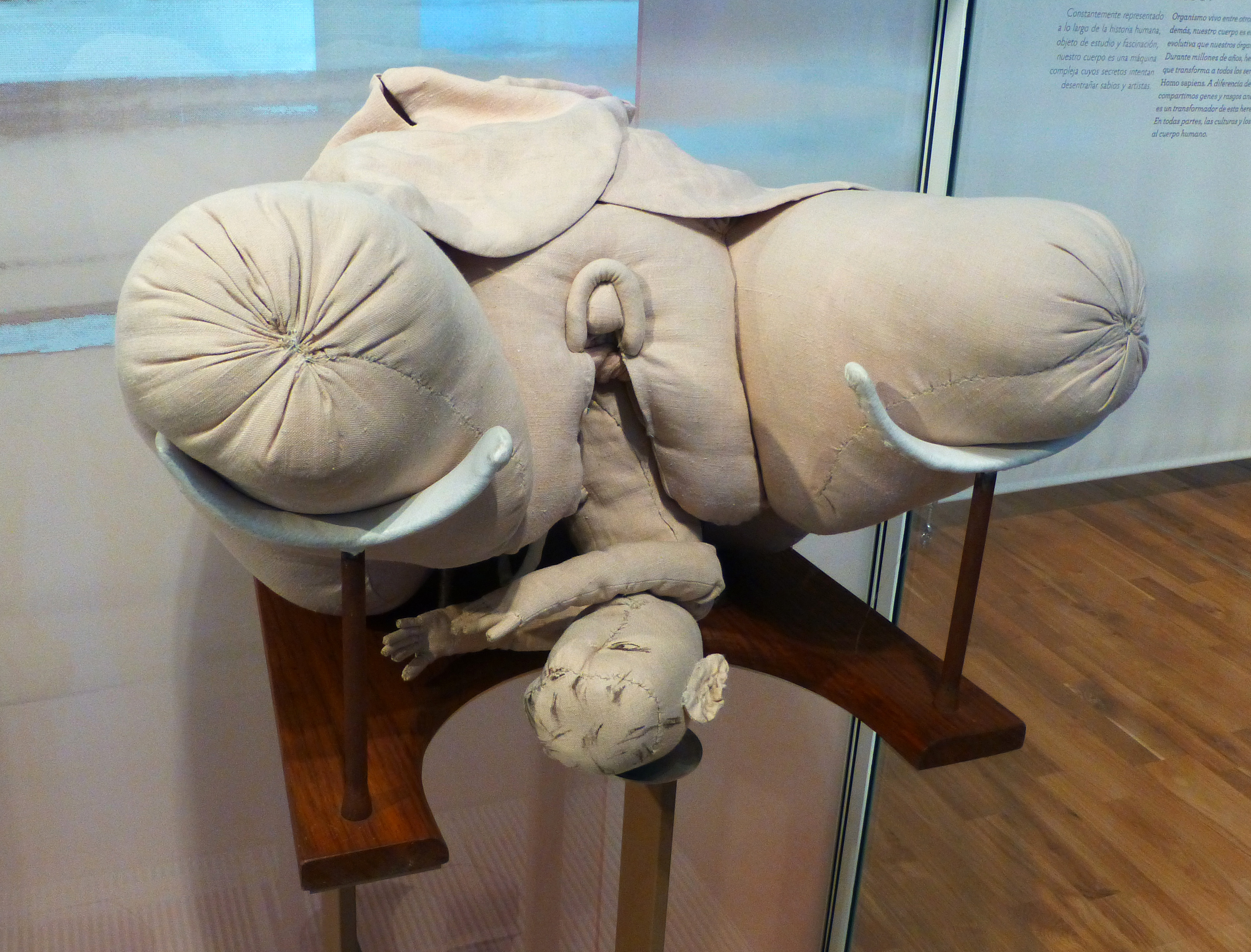
'The Machine', the first lifesize obstetrical mannequin

Du Coudray invented the first lifesize obstetrical mannequin, for practicing mock births. It was usually called "The Machine." Each cost about 300 livres to construct, usually out of fabric, leather, and stuffing, and occasionally including actual human bones to form the torso. Various strings and straps serve to simulate the stretching of the birth canal and perineum to demonstrate the process of childbirth. The head of the infant mannequin has a shaped nose, stitched ears, hair drawn with ink, and an open mouth (with tongue) into which a finger can be inserted to a depth of 5 centimetres (2.0 in). (Note: The decimal measure was not introduced until 1794. The measure for length was fairly consistent throughout most of pre-revolutionary France and had been in use since Charlemagne, using pouce (inch), pied (foot).) This detail was important, as it allowed the midwife to put two fingers into the mouth, to facilitate the passage of the head in a case of breech presentation. These mannequins were very detailed and accurate.

The invention is often attributed to a Scotsman, William Smellie, but the Royal Brevet of 19 October 1759 already mentioned du Coudray's model, giving her a prior claim on the invention.

An historical example of 'The Machine' is kept in the Musée Flaubert et d'histoire de la médecine in Rouen, France, and a copy in the Musée de l'Homme in Paris.

== Travels ==
Du Coudray first traveled to Moulins in November 1761 from Claremont, France. Le Nain, who had heard and learned a lot about du Coudray's childbirth courses in an exchange with letters with Ballainvilliers, was extremely excited about her arrival. He was one of the first people to secure her services in his city.

In her first lesson in Moulins, eighty students appeared and the second lesson brought seventy. Fewer students came because this was also harvest time and many women could not be spared from their farm duties. Du Coudray noted how many women had no aptitude and even sent them home, and only a few women really stood out to her. Her course cost the women 36–40 livres, which included the final certificate of completion. She worked her students hard and taught them just the basics, but even this was enough for them to be extremely useful in their cities. Classes took place six days a week, all morning and all afternoon, and lasted around two months, so that every student had plenty of time to listen to lectures and practice each maneuver several times on the machine. Occasionally she would allow her best students to attend live births with her supervision. In most cities she was paid 300 livres a month of her teaching.

Throughout the next year and a half she travelled to Burgundy: to Autun in 1761, Bourg-en-Bresse and Chalone-sur-Saȏne in 1763, and in the same year to Limognes-en-Quercy and Tulle. She then traveled to Angoulȇme in 1764 and Bourdeilles in the same year, then to Poitiers in 1764–65, to Sablés-sur-Sarthe in 1765, and finally to Périgueux and Agen in 1769. She held a similar course of instruction in all these regions of France. In a new development, du Coudray taught midwives to stop the practice, when an infant was delivered near death, of putting it to one side and focusing on recovery of the mother. She instructed them to attempt to revive the infant, which could be successful.

== The Abrégé ==
The Abrégé de l'art des accouchements contains du Coudray's lectures in the order that she taught them, starting with the female reproductive organs and the process of reproduction. It then explains the issue of proper prenatal care. Finally, it discusses how to deliver infants, including how to handle common obstetric problems. The Abrégé also covers rare cases that occurred during the birth process, which du Coudray notes as her "observations". Throughout the book, she refers to her "machine" as a way to explain concepts. Despite its important contributions to the field of midwifery, the Abrégé was neglected when it was initially published, because it was a small, light, unobtrusive volume. Still, the existence of the book served as an influential model for midwives during the eighteenth century.

== Death and legacy ==
Angélique du Coudray died in Bordeaux on 17 April 1794. There is mystery around her death, as it occurred during the Reign of Terror that succeeded the French Revolution. Many scholars believe she was killed during the night because she had previously been commissioned and endorsed by King Louis XV. Others argue that she simply died of old age.

In 2026, du Coudray was announced as one of 72 historical women in STEM whose names have been proposed to be added to the 72 men already celebrated on the Eiffel Tower. The plan was announced by the Mayor of Paris, Anne Hidalgo following the recommendations of a committee led by Isabelle Vauglin of Femmes et Sciences and Jean-François Martins, representing the operating company which runs the Eiffel Tower.

== See also ==
- Louyse Bourgeois, ancestor, midwife to Marie de' Medici.

== Sources ==
- Cody, Lisa Forman (2001). "Sex, Civility, and the Self: du Coudray, d'Eon, and Eighteenth-Century Conceptions of Gendered, National, and Psychological Identity". French Historical Studies. 24 (3). Project MUSE: 379–407. doi:10.1215/00161071-24-3-379. S2CID 144336195.
- Commire, Anne, ed. (1999). "Du Coudray, Angelique". Women in World History: A Biographical Encyclopedia. Vol. 4. Detroit: Yorkin Publications. p. 804.
- Fissell, Mary E. (2004). "Obstetrics and Gynecology from Europe, 1450 to 1789". In Dewald, Jonathan (ed.). Encyclopedia of the Early Modern World. Vol. 4. New York: Charles Scribner's Sons. pp. 305–308.
- Gelbart, Nina Rattner (1998). The King's Midwife : A History and Mystery of Madame du Coudray. Berkeley: University of California Press. ISBN 978-0-520-22157-4.
- Halff, Rebecca (20 May 2014) [1769]. "Angelique Marguerite Le Boursier du Coudray's Abrégé de l'art des accouchements". The New York Academy of Medicine (NYAM History Med): Books, Health, and History.
- Lindemann, Mary (2010). Medicine and Society in Early Modern Europe. CUP. p. 126. ISBN 978-0-521-73256-7.
- Stanley, Autumn (1995). Mothers and Daughters of Invention: Notes for a Revised History of Technology. Rutgers University Press. p. 234. ISBN 978-0-8135-2197-8.
- "Bourgeois, Louyse". Encyclopedia of World Biography. Encyclopedia.com. 2005.
