= MCCI =

MCCI may refer to:

- Mother and Child Care Initiative, a public-private partnership in Ebonyi State, Nigeria
- A member of the Comboni Missionaries of the Heart of Jesus, a Roman Catholic religious order
- Maoist Communist Centre of India, an armed Maoist group begun in 1969 which emerged from Dakshin Desh
- 1201, a year in the Julian calendar
- Bavarian MCCi, a class of steam railbuses built between 1906 and 1908 in Germany
- Makkah Chamber of Commerce and Industry, a semi-government organization in Saudi Arabia
- Maasin Community Multipurpose Cooperative, a member the National Confederation of Cooperatives in the Philippines
- MCCI Corporation, a developer of USB devices that is a member of the Mobile Imaging and Printing Consortium.
- MCCi, LLC, a value-added software reseller owned by Municipal Code Corporation
- Metropolitan Chamber of Commerce and Industry, Dhaka, oldest and the pre-eminent trade organization of Bangladesh
- Madras Chamber of Commerce and Industry
- Mobile Communication Company of Iran, WHOIS queries display MCCI and the full name of the largest mobile phone operator in Iran
- Musée des Civilisations de Côte d'Ivoire, national museum in Abidjan, Ivory Coast
