= Elechi (surname) =

Elechi is a surname. Notable people with the surname include:

- Anthony Elechi (born 1993), an American professional basketball player
- Josephine Elechi (born 1948), wife of Martin Elechi
- Martin Elechi, a Nigerian economist and politician
- Michael Elechi (born 2001), an English football player
