= Rachael Ogonna Umahi =

First Lady of Ebonyi State
- In office 29 May 2015 – 29 May 2023
- Preceded by: Josephine Elechi
- Succeeded by: Uamaka Nwifuru

Personal details
- Born: March 23, 1972 (age 54) Kumba, Cameroon
- Spouse: David Umahi
- Children: 7 (including Osborn Nweze Umahi)
- Education: Rivers State University of Science and Technology (BSc)
- Occupation: Philanthropist, human resource specialist

Rachael Ogonna Umahi (born 23 March 1972) is a Nigerian philanthropist who served as First Lady of Ebonyi State from 29 May 2015 to 29 May 2023. She founded the Family Succour and Upliftment Foundation, a non-governmental organization in Ebonyi State. She is married to David Umahi, a former Governor of Ebonyi State and current Minister of Works.

== Early life and education ==
Rachael Ogonna Chukwu was born on 23 March 1972 in Kumba, Cameroon, to Chukwu Akpa and his wife, who were originally from Umuobuna, Uburu, in Ohaozara Local Government Area of Ebonyi State. She attended Umuobuna/Uhuaba Community Primary School in Uburu from 1979 to 1985. In 1991, she completed her secondary education at Immaculate Girls Secondary School in Aba, Abia State.

She later studied at the Rivers State University of Science and Technology (RSUST) in Port Harcourt, graduating in 2007 with a Bachelor of Science (BSc) degree.

== Career ==
Umahi worked in human resource management in the private sector. From 2011 to 2015, she was the wife of the Deputy Governor of Ebonyi State.

On 29 May 2015, following her husband's inauguration as Governor of Ebonyi State, she assumed the role of First Lady of Ebonyi State. During her tenure, she established the Family Succour and Upliftment Foundation.

She participated in public advocacy campaigns on health and human rights, working alongside organizations including the United Nations Industrial Development Organization (UNIDO) and the United States Agency for International Development (USAID) on public health and malaria control programs. Her term as First Lady concluded on 29 May 2023 at the end of her husband's second gubernatorial term.

== Personal life ==
She married David Umahi in 1990. The couple has seven children, including engineer and politician Osborn Nweze Umahi.
