= Maternal health =

Health of women during pregnancy, child birth, and the postpartum period

Maternal health is the health of women during pregnancy, childbirth, and the postpartum period. In most cases, maternal health encompasses the health care dimensions of family planning, and preconception, prenatal, and postnatal care in order to ensure a positive and fulfilling experience. In other cases, maternal health can reduce maternal morbidity and mortality. Maternal health revolves around the health and wellness of pregnant individuals, particularly when they are pregnant, at the time they give birth, and during child-raising. WHO has indicated that even though motherhood has been considered as a fulfilling natural experience that is emotional to the mother, a high percentage of women develop health problems, sometimes resulting in death. Because of this, there is a need to invest in the health of women. The investment can be achieved in different ways, among the main ones being subsidizing the healthcare cost, education on maternal health, encouraging effective family planning, and checking up on the health of individuals who have given birth. Maternal morbidity and mortality particularly affects women of color and women living in low and lower-middle income countries.

== Maternal morbidity and mortality ==
WHO estimates that about 295,000 maternal deaths occurred in 2017. The causes of these maternal deaths range from severe bleeding to obstructed labour, all of which have highly effective interventions. Further, indirect causes of maternal mortality include anemia and malaria. As women have gained access to family planning and skilled birth attendance with backup emergency obstetric care, the global maternal mortality has fallen by about 44 percent, which represented a decline of about 2.3 percent annually over the period from 1990 to 2015. While there has been a decline in worldwide mortality rates after much effort, high rates still exist, particularly in low and middle income countries (99%). Sub-saharan Africa accounts for approximately two thirds of these deaths and South Asia accounts for about one-fifth of them. One third of the maternal deaths occur in India and Nigeria. The mother's death results in vulnerable families, and their infants, if they survive childbirth, are more likely to die before reaching their second birthday.

Both maternal mortality (death) and severe maternal morbidity (illness) are "associated with a high rate of preventability."

In 2010, the U.S. Joint Commission on Accreditation of Healthcare Organizations described maternal mortality as a "sentinel event", and uses it to assess the quality of a health care system.

Subsidizing the cost of healthcare helps to improve the health status of women. In countries such as the U.S., U.K., and others, government and non-governmental bodies work to reduce and even eliminate fees for pregnant women or women who have health issues related to pregnancy. When women deliver their babies in certified healthcare facilities without paying or paying a very small amount, they can use their money on the diet of the baby, clothing, and other needs. Also, when women attend clinics without charge and are issued free supplements, their health is maintained, and this reduces the monetary resources that the government invests in healthcare. In turn, the maternal morbidity rate, together with mortality rates, is lowered.

Education on issues related to maternal health is essential to control and improve the healthcare of women. Women who have resources have a low chance of their health status deteriorating, due to their knowledge. These women are informed to make decisions regarding family planning, the best time to give birth as far as their financial capabilities are concerned, and their nutrition, before, during, and after giving birth. Additionally, many approaches involve women, families, and local communities as active stakeholders in interventions and strategies to improve maternal health. Gannon (n.p) reports that the maternal rate of mortality dropped by 70% between 1946 and 1953, when women began receiving maternal education. The study recommended that the focus should be on communities that are marginalized and girls who are under the age of 18. When the government manages to reduce unwanted and unplanned pregnancies among these two groups of people, it becomes easier to reduce maternal health problems and the cost associated with them.

== Factors influencing maternal health ==
=== Poverty and access to healthcare ===
According to a UNFPA report, social and economic status, culture norms and values, and geographic remoteness all increase maternal mortality, and the risk for maternal death (during pregnancy or childbirth) in sub-Saharan Africa is 175 times higher than in developed countries, and risk for pregnancy-related illnesses and negative consequences after birth is even higher. Poverty, maternal health, and outcomes for the child are all interconnected.

Women living in poverty-stricken areas are more likely to be obese and engage in unhealthy behaviors such as cigarette smoking and substance use, are less likely to engage in or even have access to legitimate prenatal care, and are at a significantly higher risk for adverse outcomes for both the mother and child. A study conducted in Kenya observed that common maternal health problems in poverty-stricken areas include hemorrhaging, anemia, hypertension, malaria, placenta retention, premature labor, prolonged/complicated labor, and pre-eclampsia.

==== Prenatal care ====
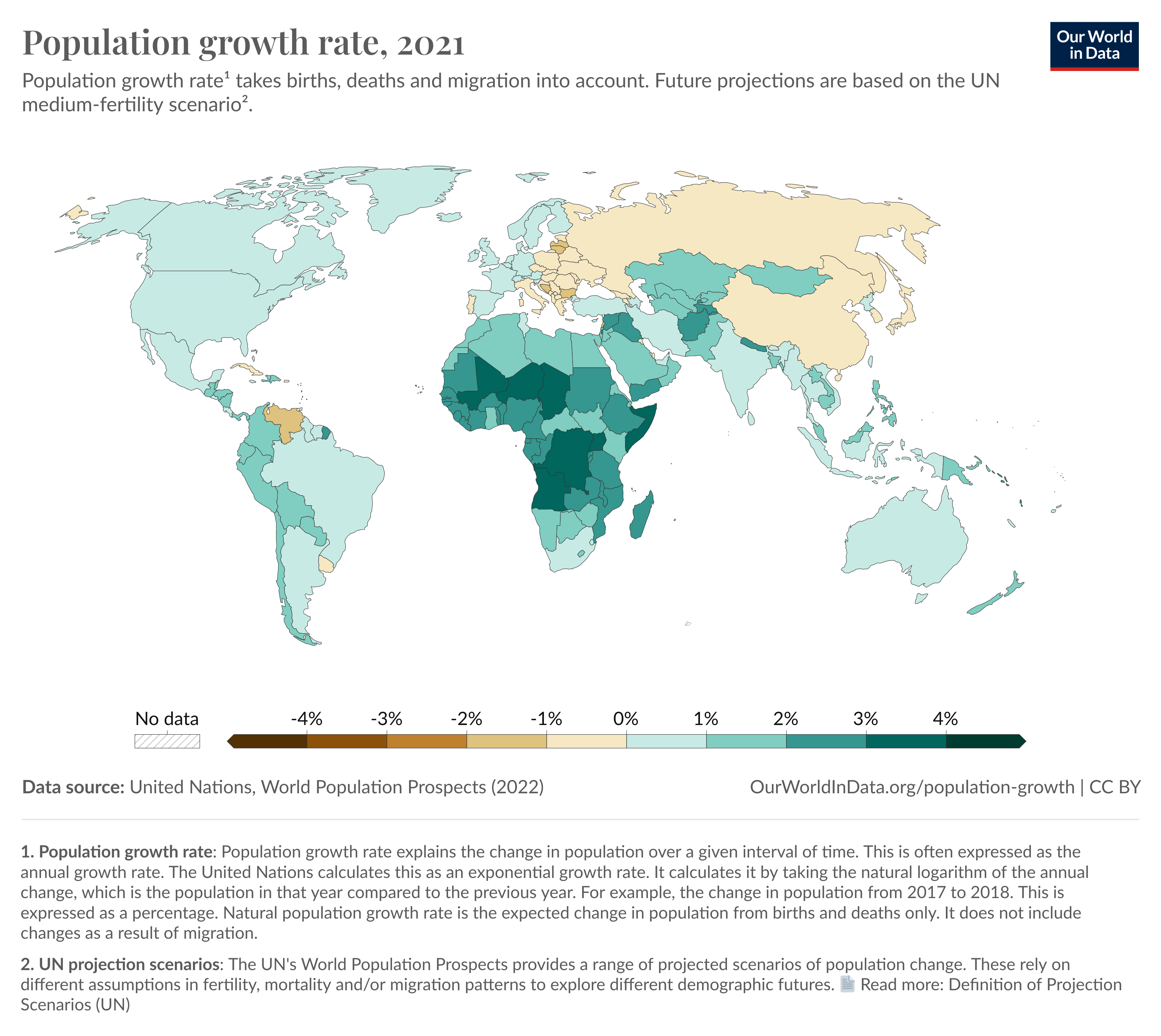
Global rates of population growth and decline (2021–2022); population growth rate takes birth, death, and migration rates into account. Future projections are based on the United Nations World Population Prospects (from 1950 until 2100).

Map of countries by total fertility rate (2022–2023), referring to the average number of children that are born to a woman over her lifetime, according to the Population Reference Bureau.

Generally, adequate prenatal care encompasses medical care and educational, social, and nutritional services during pregnancy. For example, prenatal care could include serum integrated screening tests for potential chromosomal abnormalities as well as blood pressure measurements, or uterus measurements to assess fetal growth. Although there are a variety of reasons women choose not to engage in proper prenatal care, 71% of low-income women in a US national study had difficulties getting access to prenatal care when they sought it out. Additionally, immigrants and Hispanic women are at higher risk than white or black women for receiving little to no prenatal care, where level of education is also an indicator (since education and race are correlated). Adolescents are least likely to receive any prenatal care at all. Throughout several studies, women and adolescents ranked inadequate finances and lack of transportation as the most common barriers to receiving proper prenatal care.

Income is strongly correlated with quality of prenatal care. Sometimes, proximity to healthcare facilities and access to transportation have significant effects on whether or not women have access to prenatal care. An analysis conducted on maternal healthcare services in Mali found that women who lived in rural areas, far away from healthcare facilities were less likely to receive prenatal care than those who lived in urban areas. Furthermore, researchers found an even stronger relationship between lack of transportation and prenatal and delivery care. In addition to proximity being a predictor of prenatal care access, Materia and colleagues found similar results for proximity and antenatal care in rural Ethiopia. Also, inadequate and poor quality services contributes in increasing maternal morbidity and mortality.

=== Pre-existing conditions ===
==== Pregestational diabetes ====
Pre-existing (pregestational) maternal Type 1 or Type 2 diabetes is a known factor that increases the risk of adverse outcomes, including pre-term birth, preeclampsia, and congenital birth defects. Studies from the United States and Australia indicate that the prevalence of pregestational diabetes is around 1% of pregnancies. Even healthy pregnancy causes a state of hyperglycemia. As a result, mothers with pregestational diabetes are at an increased risk for hyperglycemia.

==== HIV/AIDS ====
Maternal HIV rates vary around the world, ranging from 1% to 40%, with African and Asian countries having the highest rates. Whilst maternal HIV infection largely has health implications for the child, especially in countries where poverty is high and education levels are low, having HIV/AIDS while pregnant can also cause heightened health risks for the mother. A large concern for HIV-positive pregnant women is the risk of contracting tuberculosis (TB) and/or malaria, in developing countries. 28% of maternal deaths are from obstructed labour and indirect causes, meaning diseases that complicate pregnancy or that are complicated by pregnancy (malaria, anemia, HIV/AIDS, and cardiovascular diseases).

==== Maternal weight ====
During pregnancy, women of an average pre-pregnancy weight (BMI 18.5-24.9) should expect to gain between 25–35 pounds (11–16 kg) over the course of the pregnancy. Increased rates of hypertension, diabetes, respiratory complications, and infections are prevalent in cases of maternal obesity and can have detrimental effects on pregnancy outcomes. Obesity is an extremely strong risk factor for gestational diabetes. Research has found that obese mothers who lose weight (at least 10 pounds or 4.5 kg) between pregnancies reduce the risk of gestational diabetes during their next pregnancy, whereas mothers who gain weight actually increase their risk. Women who are pregnant should aim to exercise for at least 150 minutes per week, including muscle strengthening exercises. However, it is recommended that pregnant women discuss what exercise they can do safely with their OB/GYN in the early prenatal period.

Vigorous Exercise

The current guidelines for moderate intensity activity during pregnancy have been outlined by organizations such as the WHO and ACOG to be the same 150 minutes per week as regular physical activity guidelines. Certain modifications such as avoiding supine position after 20 weeks are also recommended. Vigorous activity guidelines during pregnancy have not been outlined as clearly or studied as much, so consulting a healthcare professional to get a safe, tailored, fitness plan is recommended. Current research supports that vigorous activity for most non-complicated singleton pregnancies is beneficial and has little negative impact on fetal wellbeing. It has also been shown to have similar benefits to those who perform the same level of activity outside of pregnancy. The concerns related to high intensity exercise during pregnancy are usually around fetal wellbeing measures such as heart rate and blood flow. No abnormal measures of fetal distress, such as heart rate or maternal/fetal blood flowwere found during high intensity/vigorous exercise, if the mother stayed under 90% of her heart rate maximum. Risks of exceeding this heart rate included decreased uterine artery blood flow and fetal bradycardia. If using vigorous exercise as a means of lowering maternal weight gain during pregnancy, it's important to note there is little evidence to suggest that higher intensity has more of an effect than moderate intensity activity on normal pregnancies; It was shown in one study that the obese/overweight population during pregnancy had improved maternal weight gain with more vigorous exercise compared to moderate although more studies are needed. When related to birth outcome measures such as mode of delivery, pain control, and duration all were unaffected when compared to moderate intensity.High intensity exercises such as stationary biking, uphill running, cross country skiing, and resistance circuit training, all showed similar benefits.

It is important to further study the effects and limitations of vigorous exercise during pregnancy as it becomes more prevalent for female athletes, and in the average population. Overall if one is already performing vigorous activity before pregnancy, no negative effects were found with the continuation of similar activity levels during pregnancy, if staying under 90% of the mothers heart rate maximum. Always consult a physician to ensure any physical activity performed is safe during pregnancy, as the recommended amount of physical activity can depend on other factors during pregnancy as well.

During and after pregnancy, mothers should receive continuous care from a physician, in-person or via telehealth depending on the need, to monitor the growth and status of the fetus. Maternal health organizations suggest that at a minimum pregnant women should receive one ultrasound at week 24 to help predict any possible growth anomalies and prevent future gestational concerns. It is also stated that pregnant women should also fulfill any missing vaccinations as soon as possible including the tetanus vaccine and influenza vaccine. For pregnant women who are at an increased risk for Pre-eclampsia, one could take a dietary supplement of low dose aspirin as prophylaxis before 20 weeks gestation. Pregnant women should also monitor their blood sugars as they are able to monitor the potential development of gestational diabetes. Other prenatal screening tests include serum integrated protein tests, cell free DNA blood tests to check for chromosomal abnormalities, and nuchal translucency ultrasounds. If their medical system is able to provide them, mothers can also undergo more invasive diagnostic tests such as an amniocentesis, or chorionic villous sampling to detect abnormalities with greater accuracy.

=== Race and ethnicity ===
Research has demonstrated that discrimination in maternal care occurs on an international level. In Canada, female patients claim to have experienced sterilization without their consent, while other female patients have experienced neglect while hospitalized that eventually led up to their death. In the United States and the United Kingdom, research has shown that black individuals are more prone to experiencing discrimination in when receiving medical attention. This discrimination leads to imbalances in the way they get treated and often results in death. Africa also faces issues with gender discrimination, which leads to maternal mortality.

==== Statistics ====
Analysis of the Pregnancy Mortality Surveillance System, conducted by the Center for Disease Control and Prevention (CDC), indicates significant racial and ethnic disparities in pregnancy-related deaths. The pregnancy-related mortality ratio (PRMR) represents the number of deaths per 100,000 live births resulting from pregnancy or pregnancy-related causes. A 2019 report from the CDC shows that the PRMRs of Black women and Indigenous women in the United States are 3-4 times higher than that of White women. White women had a PRMR of approximately 13 maternal deaths per 100,000 live births. While Black and Indigenous women had PRMRs of 41 and 30 maternal deaths per 100,000 live births, respectively. The majority of these deaths were due to preventable diseases associated with pregnancy, such as hypertension. While the fatality rate of these diseases was higher among Black and Indigenous women, the initial prevalence was generally the same across all races. The Maternal Vulnerability Index (MVI) tool, which measures risk factors on a county-by-county basis in the U.S., confirms the racial disparities in maternal health outcomes.

Although lower than that of Black and Indigenous women, the PRMR for Asian and Pacific Islander women was still slightly higher than that of the White women at 13.5. The PRMR for Hispanic women has shown a decline in recent years. However, state-specific reports show that Hispanic women still face high rates of maternal morbidity, or health problems that arise from pregnancy and birth.

==== Contributing factors ====
The CDC cites multiple causes for the racial gap in maternal mortality. They say that most pregnancy-related deaths are the combined result of 3-4 contributing factors. Some of these factors include higher rates of chronic conditions in minority communities, lower rates of prenatal care, and lower rates of insurance coverage. Furthermore, teen pregnancy rates are higher in minority communities, which is a risk factor for pregnancy or birth complications. Black and Indigenous women can also encounter racial bias held by healthcare providers, which affects the quality of care given to treat or prevent a fatal disease. For example, an NIH report states that Black women are two to three times more likely to die of hemorrhage or embolisms during pregnancy or the postpartum period. Outside of provider-patient interactions, structural factors can contribute to the racial gap in maternal mortality. This includes the gap in access to primary and preventative care as well as other social determinants of health such as education and community support. Chronic conditions such as high blood pressure and hypertension can cause pregnancy complications and maternal morbidity, and these conditions arise from the effects of the weathering hypothesis. The weathering hypothesis also states a higher rate of preterm birth among Black pregnant people in the United States, which is not only dangerous for the baby but also has effects on the birth parent. A Black birth parent of a preterm baby is more likely to experience high blood pressure following a preterm birth and subsequent higher rates of coronary artery calcification.

==== Africa ====
Research has demonstrated that Africa experiences discrimination in healthcare. Mothers experience gender-based discrimination, which affects the care a mom is receiving. In 2017, Bolren alongside other researchers conducted a study and discovered that a majority of women in Nigeria have experienced abuse: emotional and physical. Women have claimed to have delivered babies on the ground and some have claimed to have been neglected and not received medical attention. According to a research study conducted in South East Nigeria, a provider's care is a major contributing factor to why Nigerian women do not seek medical attention relating to maternal and child-health services. Providers often require a husband's permission before women are subjected to the use of contraceptives. Women are forced to follow what their husbands say, so it poses obstacles in the manner a woman receives obstetric care.

==== Canada ====
Indigenous people have a higher likelihood of passing away or developing a non-treatable illness compared to folks who are White. Stereotypes such as them being prone to addiction, being irresponsible parents, or abuse the healthcare system frequently are held by workers in the healthcare industry. Canadians with Indigenous ancestry often avoid receiving care to prevent experiencing racism. In Canada, studies have shown that 85% of people of Indigenous descent suffer from racism in a healthcare setting, and the neglect often paves the way for death to occur.

Joyce Echequan, an Indigenous woman, died as a result of the discrimination she experienced in a hospital in Quebec, Canada. A coroner claims if she were white, Echequan would be alive. Echequan was admitted into the hospital for suffering from a heart condition, but was forced to livestream her stay after workers overlooked her pain, even after it escalated. Echequan died from a rare heart disease known as pulmonary oedema. She died as a result of her symptoms being deemed as minor and assumed her symptoms derived as a result of withdrawals from narcotic usage. In 2020, Echequan was screaming from being in pain and was verbally abused by the nurses. A lady attempting to get Echequan help was silenced by the nurses. Echquan could not understand French and had difficulty understanding what workers were saying, so she would live-stream her stays at the hospital and later had her cousin translate them.

Moreover, women have claimed they have experienced female sterilization against their consent. In 2007, an Indigenous mother was subjected to a tubal ligation without her consent after giving birth.

==== United Kingdom ====
According to an empirical research conducted by the Journal of Advanced Nursing, people of color are more likely to experience complications from pregnancy or experience child mortalities solely based on their race and ethnicity. Stereotypes and implicit biases, for of discrimination, affect the ability for women to speak up. Female patients in the United Kingdom have claimed that they have experienced microaggressions, neglect in their pain treatment, and stereotypes about their biology being able to withstand higher levels of pain.

Tinu Alikor, a mother of three, lost an abnormal amount of blood during the last three months of her pregnancy, which led to her seeking medical attention. Doctors deemed it as a thing that was not that important to look at, since Alikor had a urinary tract infection. Weeks after being discharged, she was hospitalized for two weeks and received blood transfusions due to the blood she lost. The doctor had claimed she had “refused to be examined,” but Alikor refutes that claim as she begged medical providers to examine her for her abnormal loss of blood. Similarly, during Alikor's second pregnancy, she experienced neglect once again. She was seeking some sort of pain reliever, but was not deemed as important to take care of until her child's head popped out.

High pain tolerances are a common stereotype that is often associated with Black women according to a report from Birthrights. Women and babies are described to have tougher and thicker skin. White people are commonly used in medicine, which makes it difficult for conditions like jaundice to be diagnosed in Black bodies. Asian women are stereotyped as people who can not withstand the pain and weak. Asians and black women are more prone to dying from childbirth than a white women.

According to the report from Birthrights, a 31-year-old mom received care a day after she had developed sepsis after being induced. She experienced symptoms like body aches and tachycardia, but was told it was “normal." Her baby was rushed into the neonatal intensive care unit to treat the sepsis infection it had acquired as well.

==== United States ====
Some providers in the United States believe Black women have different embryology, sturdier bones, nerve endings that are less sensitive, and thicker skin, and hence, do not require much attention. Alongside, white individuals have higher rates to receive pain treatment (epidurals) during labor, than a woman who is Black or Hispanic. White women are 2.5 times less likely to die from a death that is related to their pregnancy compared to Black women. It was harder for providers to acknowledge when a Black mother was in pain because it was harder to visualize it in their faces. Furthermore, Black women experience longer recovery times due to being treated differently, and often lead to their leave of absence time being extended, which can often lead them to be fired, affecting them financially.

=== Religion ===
There are many factors that influence maternal health and the access of resources. One of these factors that recent studies have highlighted is religion. For example, one such study stated that, due to the insensitivity and lack of knowledge that physicians showed immigrant Muslim women in Canada, their health information and treatment suffered. The health care that they received from physicians did not provide information in respect to their religious or cultural practices and did little to provide cultural adjustments and emotional support. In order to provide a safer and more comfortable environment for Muslim women, it was proven that they needed more support that would connect with the immigrant community and health-related information. Discrimination based on religion is a factor that effects the maternal health care of women from different backgrounds. There is not a lot of discussion on the studies that reflect the hardships that women go through in terms of their religion and maternal care. Stigmatizing certain maternal and reproductive practices is common within the context of religion. For example, in a study that focused on interviewing women who have had abortions, one participant used the word "guilt" 16 times in her one-hour interview. She cited that the cause of her guilt was because of her Catholic upbringing. The overall data showed that there was a strong relationship between religion and self-stigma. Among the women who identified as a practicing Christian, 65% made statements that proved self-stigma effects. There is a lot of stigma and norms regarding religion that, in turn, place women at risk when receiving health-care. Other religious practices and traditions have shown to influence maternal health in a negative way. Practitioners of apostolicism in Zimbabwe have been associated with higher maternal mortality. Results of a study showed the dangerous associations that religion may have on maternal health. The general trend shows that Apostolicism promotes high fertility, early marriage, non-use of contraceptives and low or non-use of hospital care. There are delays in recognizing danger signs, deciding to seek care and receiving appropriate health care. Future studies can look at how societal traditions or expectations such as gender roles may combine with religion to result in poorer maternal health care.

Although factors of religion can negatively influence maternal health care, other studies show the necessity of understanding different religious beliefs and practices. In Ghana, interviews of women showed the benefits of transparent religious beliefs and practices while pregnant and in labor. Spiritual interventions done by pastors in pregnancy included prayer, revelations, reversing negative dreams, laying of hands and anointing women. Religious artifacts used among the women during pregnancy and labor were anointing oil, blessed water, stickers, blessed white handkerchief, blessed sand, Bible and Rosary. The women made many connections to these practices and to their religion such as God having the capability to reduce labor pain and to provide a safe and successful delivery. The results concluded that spirituality is an integral part of the care of pregnant women in Ghana. In order to ensure the safety of these women, their religious practices should not be in secrecy. The presence of artifacts implies that women do not have the freedom to practice their religion at home. It was concluded that pastors should be sensitive to their role in the labor process and that revelations and spiritual interventions should not lead to pregnancy or labor complications. Future studies in religion and maternal health care will focus on the role of pastors, familiar support, and the views of midwives or health care professionals in different societies around the world.

== Effects on child health and development ==
=== Prenatal health ===
Prenatal care is an important part of basic maternal health care. It is recommended expectant mothers receive at least four antenatal healthcare visits, in which a health worker can check for signs of illness – such as underweight, anaemia or infection – and monitor the health and status of the fetus. During these visits, women are counselled on nutrition and hygiene to optimize their health prior to, and following, delivery. These visits can also include health maintenance of any pre-existing health conditions the woman may have had prior to becoming pregnant - such as diabetes, hypertension, or renal disease. In collaboration with her healthcare provider, the patient can develop a birth plan which outlines how to reach care and what to do in the event of an emergency.

The model CenteringPregnancy (group prenatal care) is a relatively new addition to prenatal healthcare, and has shown to improve both birth outcomes and patient & provider satisfaction. Specifically, a randomized controlled trial indicated a 33 percent reduction in preterm birth (n=995), and the decrease was even more pronounced for Black/African American participants. CenteringPregnancy provides physical exams, education, and peer support to a group of pregnant women who all have a similar due date. Research in race concordant group prenatal care (like the EMBRACE group at UCSF) has not yet been researched enough to indicate improved outcomes. Nonetheless, race concordant care has been proven to improve patient experience and patient & provider communication. Newborn-physician racial concordance was significantly associated with mortality improvements for black infants in 2020, but debunked in 2024.

Poverty, malnutrition, and substance use may contribute to impaired cognitive, motor, and behavioral problems across childhood. In other words, if a mother is not in optimal health during the prenatal period (the time while she is pregnant) and/or the fetus is exposed to teratogen(s), the child is more likely to experience health or developmental difficulties, or death. The environment in which the mother provides for the embryo/fetus is critical to its wellbeing well after gestation and birth.

A teratogen is "any agent that can potentially cause a birth defect or negatively alter cognitive and behavioral outcomes." Dose, genetic susceptibility, and time of exposure are all factors for the extent of the effect of a teratogen on an embryo or fetus.

Prescription drugs taken during pregnancy such as streptomycin, tetracycline, some antidepressants, progestin, synthetic estrogen, and Accutane, as well as over-the-counter drugs such as diet pills, can result in teratogenic outcomes for the developing embryo/fetus. Additionally, high dosages of aspirin are known to lead to maternal and fetal bleeding, although low-dose aspirin is usually not harmful.

Newborns whose mothers use heroin during the gestational period often exhibit withdrawal symptoms at birth and are more likely to have attention problems and health issues as they grow up. Use of stimulants like methamphetamine and cocaine during pregnancy are linked to a number of problems for the child such as low birth weight and small head circumference, motor and cognitive developmental delays, as well as behavioral problems across childhood. The American Academy of Child and Adolescent Psychiatry found that six-year-olds whose mothers had smoked during pregnancy scored lower on an intelligence test than children whose mothers had not.

Cigarette smoking during pregnancy can have a multitude of detrimental effects on the health and development of the offspring. Common results of smoking during pregnancy include pre-term births, low birth weights, fetal and neonatal deaths, respiratory problems, and sudden infant death syndrome (SIDS), as well as increased risk for cognitive impairment, attention deficit hyperactivity disorder (ADHD) and other behavioral problems. Also, in a study published in the International Journal of Cancer, children whose mothers smoked during pregnancy experienced a 22% risk increase for non-Hodgkin lymphoma.

Although alcohol use in careful moderation (one to two servings a few days a week) during pregnancy are not generally known to cause fetal alcohol spectrum disorder (FASD), the US Surgeon General advises against the consumption of alcohol at all during pregnancy. Excessive alcohol use during pregnancy can cause FASD, which commonly consist of physical and cognitive abnormalities in the child such as facial deformities, defective limbs, face, and heart, learning problems, below average intelligence, and intellectual disability (ID).

Although HIV/AIDS can be transmitted to offspring at different times, the most common time that mothers pass on the virus is during pregnancy. During the perinatal period, the embryo/fetus can contract the virus through the placenta.

Gestational diabetes is directly linked with obesity in offspring through adolescence. Additionally, children whose mothers had diabetes are more likely to develop Type II diabetes. Mothers who have gestational diabetes have a high chance of giving birth to very large infants (10 pounds (4.5 kg) or more). This is a cause of macrosomia. Neonates with macrosomia have significantly increased rates of hypoglycemia compared to infants of mothers without diabetes. This is because macrosomic neonates are used to high levels of circulating blood sugars in utero, which results in naturally high levels of insulin. At birth, when the gestational source of blood sugar is abruptly removed, this causes the neonates to experience severe drops in blood sugar.

Because the embryo or fetus's nutrition is based on maternal protein, vitamin, mineral, and total caloric intake, infants born to malnourished mothers are more likely to exhibit malformations. Additionally, maternal stress can affect the fetus both directly and indirectly. When a mother is under stress, physiological changes occur in the body that could harm the developing fetus. Additionally, the mother is more likely to engage in behaviors that could negatively affect the fetus, such as tobacco smoking, substance use, and alcohol use.

=== Childbirth and sexually transmitted infections ===
Genital herpes, rubella, cytomegalovirus, varicella, parvovirus B19, and enteroviruses can be passed to the baby through the birth canal during delivery. In pregnancies where the mother is infected with the virus, 25% of babies delivered through an infected birth canal become brain damaged, and 1/3 die. HIV/AIDS can also be transmitted during childbirth through contact with the mother's body fluids or transmission to the fetus via the placenta. Mothers in developed countries may often elect to undergo a caesarean section to reduce the risk of transmitting the virus through the birth canal, but this option is not always available in developing countries.

=== Postpartum period ===
Globally, more than eight million of the 136 million women giving birth each year have excessive bleeding after childbirth. This condition—medically referred to as postpartum hemorrhage (PPH)—causes one out of every four maternal deaths that occur annually and accounts for more maternal deaths than any other individual cause. Deaths due to postpartum hemorrhage disproportionately affect women in developing countries.

For every woman who dies from causes related to pregnancy, an estimated 20 to 30 encounter serious complications. At least 15 per cent of all births are complicated by a potentially fatal condition. Women who survive such complications often require lengthy recovery times and may face lasting physical, psychological, social and economic consequences. Although many of these complications are unpredictable, almost all are treatable. Findings from a 2023 systematic review of the literature have found a relationship between health insurance coverage and postpartum outcomes, suggesting that those with little to no coverage have increased negative postpartum health outcomes. .

During the postpartum period, many mothers breastfeed their infants. Transmission of HIV/AIDS through breastfeeding is a huge issue in developing countries, namely in African countries. The majority of infants who contract HIV through breast milk do so within the first six weeks of life, despite that antiretroviral treatment (during pregnancy, delivery and during breastfeeding) reduces transmission risk by >90%. However, in healthy mothers, there are many benefits for infants who are breastfed. The World Health Organization recommends that mothers breastfeed their children for the first two years of life, whereas the American Academy of Pediatrics and the American Academy of Family Physicians recommend that mothers do so for at least the first six months, and continue as long as is mutually desired. Infants who are breastfed by healthy mothers (not infected with HIV/AIDS) are less prone to infections such as Haemophilus influenza, Streptococcus pneunoniae, Vibrio cholerae, Escherichia coli, Giardia lamblia, group B streptococci, Staphylococcus epidermidis, rotavirus, respiratory syncytial virus and herpes simplex virus-1, as well as gastrointestinal and lower respiratory tract infections and otitis media. Lower rates of infant mortality are observed in breastfed babies in addition to lower rates of sudden infant death syndrome (SIDS). Decreases in obesity and diseases such as childhood metabolic disease, asthma, atopic dermatitis, Type I diabetes, and childhood cancers are also seen in children who are breastfed.

Following up on the women who have given birth is a crucial factor as it helps check on maternal health. Since healthcare facilities have records of the women who have given birth, when the women are followed to monitor the progress of their babies as well as their health, it becomes easy to put them on a follow-up and ensure they are doing well as the baby grows. Follow-up is accompanied by nutritional advice to ensure both the mother and her baby are in good condition. This prevents sickness that may affect the two and deteriorate their health.

Additionally, longitudinal followup must include mental health support and screening, as roughly 15% of women will experience postpartum depression, also known as "baby blues", within the first year of birth, although it typically starts in the first 1–3 weeks after birth.

== Recommended maternal health practices ==
Maternal health care and care of the fetus starts with prenatal health. The World Health Organization suggests that the first step towards health is a balanced diet which includes a mix of vegetables, meat, fish, nuts, whole grains, fruits and beans. Additionally, iron supplements and folic acid are recommended to be taken by pregnant women daily. These supplements are recommended by the US Surgeon General to help prevent birth complications for mothers and babies such as low birth weight, anemia, hypertension and pre-term birth. Folic acid can aid neural tube formation in a fetus, which happens early in gestation and therefore should be recommended as soon as possible. Calcium and Vitamin A supplements are also recommended when those compounds are not available or only available in low doses in the natural diet but other supplements such as Vitamins D, E, C, and B6 are not recommended. The WHO also suggests that low impact exercise and reduction of caffeine intake to less than 330 mg/day can help to reduce the likelihood of neonatal morbidity. Light exercise should be continued for pregnant mothers as it has been recommended to combat negative health outcomes, side effects and birth complications related to obesity. The overturned advice that pregnant women's heartate should not exceed 140 as of 2012 was still popularly believed. Should possible side effects of a pregnancy occur, such as nausea, vomiting, heartburn, leg cramps, lower back pain, and constipation; low intensity exercise, balanced diet, or natural herb supplements are recommended by the WHO to mitigate the side effects. the US Surgeon General recommends abstaining from consuming alcohol or nicotine in any form throughout the duration of one's pregnancy, and to avoid using it as a way to mitigate some of the side effects of pregnancy mentioned earlier.

In the case of a healthy vaginal birth, mothers and babies typically are recommended to stay at the hospital for 24 hours before departing. This is suggested to allow time to assess the mother and child for any possible complications such as bleeding or additional contractions. The WHO recommends that babies should have checkups with a physician on day 3, day 7-14 and 6 weeks after birth. At these follow-up appointments the emotional well-being of the mother should also be considered. Special attention to the possibility of postpartum depression, which affects 10-15% of mothers in 40 countries is also recommended by the WHO. A 2021 systematic review of found that counseling interventions delivered by trained nonspecialist providers, such as nurses and midwives, were effective in reducing perinatal depression and anxiety symptoms, highlighting task-sharing and telemedicine to expand mental health care access for pregnant and postpartum women. At these check ins mothers also have the opportunity to seek consultation from a physician about starting the breastfeeding process.

== Long-term effects for the mother ==
Maternal health problems include complications from childbirth that do not result in death. For every woman that dies during childbirth, approximately 20 develop infection, injury, or disability. Around 75% of women who die in childbirth would be alive today if they had access to pregnancy prevention and healthcare interventions. Black women are more likely to experience pregnancy-related deaths as well as to receive less effective medical care during pregnancy.

Women who have chronic hypertension before their pregnancy are at increased risk of complications such as premature birth, low birthweight or stillbirth. Women who have high blood pressure and had complications in their pregnancy have three times the risk of developing cardiovascular disease compared to women with normal blood pressure who had no complications in pregnancy. Monitoring pregnant women's blood pressure can help prevent both complications and future cardiovascular diseases.

Almost 50% of the births in developing countries still take place without a medically skilled attendant to aid the mother, and the ratio is even higher in South Asia. Women in Sub-Saharan Africa mainly rely on traditional birth attendants (TBAs), who have little or no formal health care training. In recognition of their role, some countries and non-governmental organizations are making efforts to train TBAs in maternal health topics, in order to improve the chances for better health outcomes among mothers and babies.

Breastfeeding provides women with several long-term benefits. Women who breastfeed experience better glucose levels, lipid metabolism, and blood pressure, and lose pregnancy weight faster than those who do not. Additionally, women who breastfeed experience lower rates of breast cancer, ovarian cancer, and type 2 diabetes. However, it is important to keep in mind that breastfeeding provides substantial benefits to women who are not infected with HIV. In countries where HIV/AIDS rates are high, such as South Africa and Kenya, the virus is a leading cause of maternal mortality, especially in mothers who breastfeed. A complication is that many HIV-infected mothers cannot afford formula, and thus have no way of preventing transmission to the child through breast milk or avoiding health risks for themselves. In cases like this, mothers have no choice but to breastfeed their infants regardless of their knowledge of the harmful effects.

== Maternal Mortality Rate ==
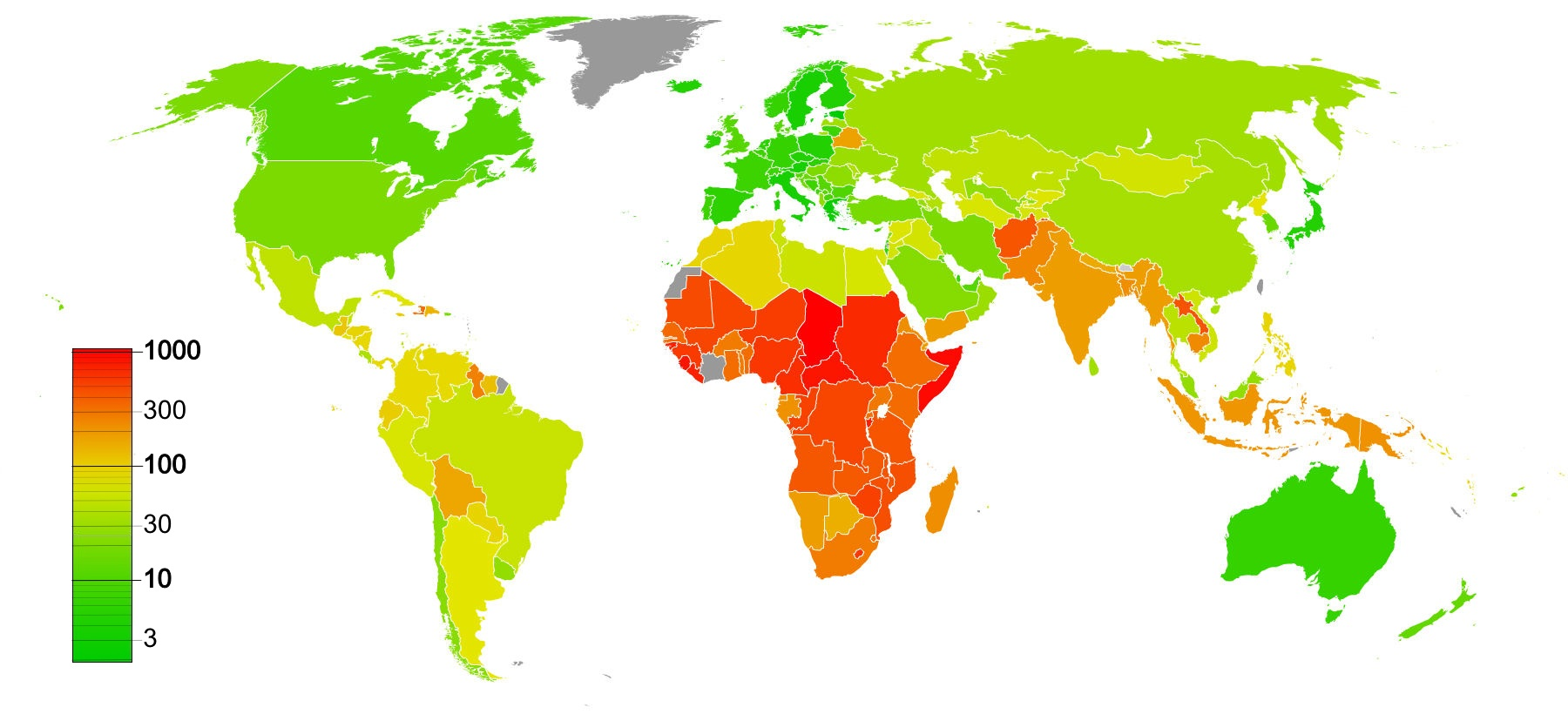
Maternal Mortality Rate worldwide, as defined by the number of maternal deaths per 100,000 live births from any cause related to or aggravated by pregnancy or its management, excluding accidental or incidental causes.

Worldwide, the Maternal Mortality Ratio (MMR), which is defined as deaths per 100,000 live births per time-period, has decreased, with South-East Asia seeing the most dramatic decrease of 59% and Africa seeing a decline of 27%. There are no regions that are on track to meet the Millennium Development Goal of decreasing maternal mortality by 75% by the year 2015.

=== Maternal mortality—a sentinel event ===
In a September 2016 ACOG/SMFM consensus, published concurrently in the journal Obstetrics & Gynecology and by the American College of Obstetricians and Gynecologists (ACOG), they noted that while they did not yet have a "single, comprehensive definition of severe maternal morbidity" (SMM), the rate of SMM is increasing in the United States as is maternal mortality. Both are "associated with a high rate of preventability."

The U.S. Joint Commission on Accreditation of Healthcare Organizations calls maternal mortality a "sentinel event", and uses it to assess the quality of a health care system.

Maternal mortality data is said to be an important indicator of overall health system quality because pregnant women survive in sanitary, safe, well-staffed and stocked facilities. If new mothers are thriving, it indicates that the health care system is doing its job. If not, problems likely exist.

According to Garret, increasing maternal survival, along with life expectancy, is an important goal for the world health community, as they show that other health issues are also improving. If these areas improve, disease-specific improvements are also better able to positively impact populations.

=== MMR in low and lower-middle income countries ===
==== Statistics ====
Maternal mortality rates are extremely high worldwide. However, most women who die during or after pregnancy live in low and lower-middle income countries. Specifically, in 2017, 94% of all maternal deaths occurred in low and lower-middle income countries. The MMR in low-income countries was 462 in 2017 signifying that 462 mothers died during childbirth for every 100,000 live births. In many low and lower-middle income countries complications of pregnancy and childbirth are the leading causes of death among women of reproductive age. According to the World Health Organization, in its World Health Report 2005, poor maternal conditions account for the fourth leading cause of death for women worldwide, after HIV/AIDS, malaria, and tuberculosis. In low-income countries, most maternal deaths and injuries during pregnancy and labor are due to preventative issues that have been largely eradicated in higher income countries including postpartum hemorrhaging, hypertensive disease, and maternal infections. For example, postpartum hemorrhaging is the leading cause of maternal death globally; however, 99% of postpartum hemorrhages occur in low and lower-middle income countries.

==== Decline in MMR over time ====
The MMR is extremely high in low-income countries; however, it is necessary to acknowledge the reduction in MMR that has occurred over the past two decades. The MMR has drastically declined in low-income countries since 2010. In low and lower-middle income countries, the average decline rate of the MMR is about 2.9% since 2000. This improvement was caused by lower pregnancy rates in some countries; higher income, which improves nutrition and access to health care; more education for women; and the increasing availability of "skilled birth attendants"—people with training in basic and emergency obstetric care—to help women give birth. Despite this immense progress, there is still lots of work that must be done in order for low-income countries to meet the goal of the WHO organization of an MMR of less than 130 by 2030. Looking forward, the MMR in low and lower-income countries must continue to decline through improving access to skilled birth attendants to perform cesarean sections and other necessary procedures, increased access to family planning, and increased access to hospital facilities.

=== MMR in high-income countries ===
Until the early 20th century developed and developing countries had similar rates of maternal mortality. Since most maternal deaths and injuries are preventable, they have been largely eradicated in the developed world.

In developed countries, Black (non-Latina) women have higher maternal mortality rates than White (non-Latina) women. According to the New York City Department of Health and Mental Hygiene - Bureau of Maternal, Infant and Reproductive Health, it was found that from 2008 to 2012, Black (non-Latina) women have a pregnancy-related mortality rate twelve times higher than White (non-Latina) women. The U.S. has the "highest rate of maternal mortality in the industrialized world." It is also estimated that 50% of the deaths are from preventable causes. It was found that Black women were experiencing higher rates of maternal mortality from cardiomyopathy, complications from hypertension, and hemorrhage. Black women were also found to be at an increased risk for experiencing preeclampsia, abrupt placentae, placenta prevue, and postpartum hemorrhage when compared to white women. Even though these obstetric complications could also occur in white women, black women were more likely to experience fatality and adverse outcomes from these complications.

Since 2016, ProPublica and NPR investigated factors that led to the increase in maternal mortality in the United States. They reported that the "rate of life-threatening complications for new mothers in the U.S. has more than doubled in two decades due to pre-existing conditions, medical errors and unequal access to care." According to the United States Centers for Disease Control and Prevention (CDC), c. 4 million women who give birth in the US annually, over 50,000 a year, experience "dangerous and even life-threatening complications." Of those 700 to 900 die every year "related to pregnancy and childbirth." A "pervasive problem" is the rapidly increasing rate of "severe maternal morbidity" (SMM), which does not yet have a "single, comprehensive definition". The U.S healthcare system is in need of great improvement to reduce the rates of maternal mortality. With the shortage of primary care providers, including access to midwives and obstetricians, pregnant women are experiencing a delay in receiving prenatal care. This is of even greater concern for pregnant women that have chronic conditions prior to pregnancy, such as hypertension or diabetes, that need to have their pregnancies closely monitored.

According to a report by the CDC, in 1993 the rate of SMM rose from 49.5 to 144 "per 10,000 delivery hospitalizations" in 2014, an increase of almost 200 percent. Blood transfusions also increased during the same period with "from 24.5 in 1993 to 122.3 in 2014 and are considered to be the major driver of the increase in SMM. After excluding blood transfusions, the rate of SMM increased by about 20% over time, from 28.6 in 1993 to 35.0 in 2014."

== The Sustainable Development Goals and maternal mortality ==
In SDG 3, countries set a target to accelerate the decline of maternal mortality by 2030, specifically to: reduce "the global MMR to less than 70 per 100 000 births, with no country having a maternal mortality rate of more than twice the global average".

== Proposed improvements ==
The WHO estimates that the cost to provide basic family planning for both maternal and neonatal health care to women in developing countries is US$8 per person a year. Many non-profit organizations have programs educating the public and gaining access to emergency obstetric care for mothers in developing countries. The United Nations Population Fund (UNPFA) recently began its Campaign on Accelerated Reduction of Maternal Mortality in Africa (CARMMA), focusing on providing quality healthcare to mothers. One of the programs within CARMMA is Sierra Leone providing free healthcare to mothers and children. This initiative has widespread support from African leaders and was started in conjunction with the African Union Health Ministers.

Improving maternal health was the fifth of the United Nations' eight Millennium Development Goals (MDGs), targeting a reduction in the number of women dying during pregnancy and childbirth by three quarters by 2015, notably by increasing the usage of skilled birth attendants, contraception and family planning. The current decline of maternal deaths is only half of what is necessary to achieve this goal, and in several regions such as Sub-Saharan Africa the maternal mortality rate is actually increasing. However, one country that may meet their MDG 5 is Nepal, which has it appears reduced its maternal mortality by more than 50% since the early 1990s. As the 2015 deadline for the MDG's approaches, an understanding of the policy developments leading to the inclusion of maternal health within the MDG's is essential for future advocacy efforts.

According to the UNFPA, maternal deaths would be reduced by about two-thirds, from 287,000 to 105,000, if needs for modern family planning and maternal and new-born health care were met. Therefore, investing in family planning and improved maternal health care brings many benefits including reduced risks of complications and improvement in health for mothers and their children. Education is also critical with research showing "that women with no education were nearly three times more likely to die during pregnancy and childbirth than women who had finished secondary school." Evidence shows that women who are better educated tend to have healthier children. Education would also improve employment opportunities for women which results in improving their status, contributing to family savings, reducing poverty and contributing to economic growth. All of these invests bring significant benefits and effects not only for women and girls but also their children, families, communities and their country.

Developed countries had rates of maternal mortality similar to those of developing countries until the early twentieth century, therefore several lessons can be learned from the west. During the nineteenth century Sweden had high levels of maternal mortality, and there was a strong support within the country to reduce mortality rate to fewer than 300 per 100,000 live births. The Swedish government began public health initiatives to train enough midwives to attend all births. This approach was also later used by Norway, Denmark, and the Netherlands who also experienced similar successes.

Increasing contraceptive usage and family planning also improves maternal health through reduction in numbers of higher risk pregnancies and by lowering the inter-pregnancy interval. In Nepal a strong emphasis was placed on providing family planning to rural regions and it was shown to be effective. Madagascar saw a dramatic increase in contraceptive use after instituting a nationwide family planning program, the rate of contraceptive use increased from 5.1% in 1992 to 29% in 2008.

Family planning has been reported to be a significant factor in maternal health. Governments should invest in their national healthcare to ensure that all women are aware of birth control methods. The government, through the ministry of health, should liaise with the private healthcare as well as the public healthcare division to ensure that women are educated and encouraged to use the right family planning method. The government should invest in this operation as when the rate of underage, as well as unplanned pregnancies, are reduced the healthcare cost stand a chance to drop by up to 8%. Healthcare will, therefore, be in a position to handle the other women who give birth. This will result in an improvement in maternal health.

Four elements are essential to maternal death prevention. First, prenatal care. It is recommended that expectant mothers receive at least four antenatal visits to check and monitor the health of mother and fetus. Second, skilled birth attendance with emergency backup such as doctors, nurses and midwives who have the skills to manage normal deliveries and recognize the onset of complications. Third, emergency obstetric care to address the major causes of maternal death which are hemorrhage, sepsis, unsafe abortion, hypertensive disorders and obstructed labour. Lastly, postnatal care which is the six weeks following delivery. During this time bleeding, sepsis and hypertensive disorders can occur and new-borns are extremely vulnerable in the immediate aftermath of birth. Therefore, follow-up visits by a health worker is assess the health of both mother and child in the postnatal period is strongly recommended. Digital health technologies are increasingly being used to support maternal care worldwide. Online pregnancy communities and telehealth programs have been shown to improve access to information and reduce feelings of isolation among expectant mothers. These digital tools can also help healthcare providers monitor pregnancies remotely, improving continuity of care for women in underserved or rural regions. According to the World Health Organization, “Digital health, or the use of digital technologies for health, has become a salient field of practice for employing routine and innovative forms of information and communications technology (ICT) to address health needs.” A 2023 review found that digital technology-enabled health interventions, such as mobile applications and virtual education programs, improve engagement and health outcomes for expectant mothers.

== See also ==
- Birth attendants
- Black Maternal Mortality in the United States
- Brain health and pollution
- Complications of pregnancy
- Global health
- Global Strategy for Women's and Children's Health
- Maternal health in Rwanda
- Maternal Health Task Force
- Maternal oral health
- Postpartum Bleeding
- Reproductive Health Supplies Coalition
- Reproductive health
- Sex education
- Women's health

== Bibliography ==
- Joint Commission (26 January 2010). "Preventing maternal death" (PDF). Sentinel Event Alert (44). Archived from the original (PDF) on 10 May 2017.
- "Maternal survival (5 articles)". The Lancet. 368. September–October 2006.
- Rosenfield A, Maine D, Freedman L (September 2006). "Meeting MDG-5: an impossible dream?". Lancet. 368 (9542): 1133–5. doi:10.1016/S0140-6736(06)69386-0. PMID 17011925. S2CID 12109602.
- UN (2015). The Millennium Development Goals Report 2015 (PDF). New York: United Nations.
