= Tagum Cooperative =

Philippine cooperative with over 117,000 members

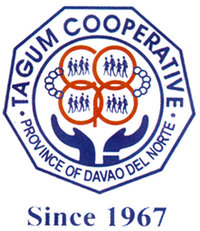
- Type: Savings and Credit Cooperative
- Industry: Finance and Insurance
- Founded: Tagum City, Philippines (1967)
- Headquarters: Dalisay Gante Road, Magugpo West, Tagum City, Philippines
- Key people: Jose Alvic P. Suaybaguio, CE, ESE, MPA (Chairperson, Board of Directors) Monica L. Salido, MM (Vice-Chairperson, Board of Directors) Jovencio I. Rubilla, Jr., CPA (Chief Executive Officer)
- Products: Financial services
- Total assets: ₱19,747,000,000 (2025)
- Members: 192,534 (2025)
- Divisions: Savings & Credit Group; Member Benefits Assistance; Coop FuneCare
- Website: https://www.tagumcooperative.coop

Tagum Cooperative is one of the largest cooperatives in Mindanao, Philippines as it is classified by the Cooperative Development Authority (CDA) of the Philippines as a large cooperative. Its main office is located along Dalisay Road, Magugpo West, Tagum City.

== History ==
Tagum Cooperative started as Holy Name Society of Tagum Parish by the Maryknoll Fathers in May 1967 with a handful of members and an available share capital of ₱80.00.

It was branded a Finance Organization achieving Certified Credit Union Standards (FOCCUS) in the year 2000 by the World Council of Credit Unions (WOCCU), based in the United States, through its outreaching-cooperative program office Credit Union Empowerment and Strengthening (CUES) - Philippines.

== Products ==
Tagum Cooperative offers the following products and services.

=== Savings products ===
- Share capital (mandatory for all cooperative member-owners)
- Regular savings (mandatory for all cooperative member-owners)
- Time deposits
- GASAKA Savings (Gasa Alang Sa Kaugmaon time deposit)
- Time in 30
- Golden H.E.A.R.T.S. (for senior citizen members)
- Honey Plan (housing and home improvement)
- Wedding Savings
- Emergency Ready Savings
- DRIVE Savings (Dream Inspired Vehicle)
- SureTec Savings
- Birthday Savings
- Vacation Savings
- Christmas Savings
- Serenity Savings
- SALAd (Save A Lot Advocacy)
- Equity Savings Program
- Heroes GIFT (Grow Investment Savings For Tomorrow)
- TCOPPS (Tagum Cooperative Overseas Pinoy Premium Savings)
- PaSaDa (Pabilisang Savings Sa Mga Driver Advocacy)

=== Loan products ===
- Major loans
  - Regular loan (RL)
  - Government Employees’ Salary Loan (GESL)
    - GESL for Department of Education (DepEd) employees
    - GESL for barangay LGU employees
    - GESL for LGU, national government, and GOCC employees
  - Accredited DepEd Employees Salary Loan (ADESL)
  - Private Employees Salary Loan (PESL)
  - Pensioners Loan (PL)
  - Prime Asset Liquidation Service (PALS)
  - Income Generating Service Loan (IGSL)
  - Standby Credit Line Service (SCLS)
  - Car loan (CL)
- Minor loans
  - Cash advance
  - Emergency loan
  - Educational loan
- Special loans
  - Instant Loan Bonanza
  - Micro-finance Loan
  - Benefits Loan
  - Furniture, Appliance, and Gadget Loan (FAGL)
  - Travel Loan
  - Convenient Loan
  - ESP Loan
- Pabahay loan (PL)

=== Insurance products ===
- Himsug Pamilya Program (HPP; mandatory for all cooperative member-owners)
- Mortuary insurance (mandatory for all cooperative member-owners)
- Life, accident, and health insurance
- Family insurance
- Group insurance
- Vehicle insurance
- Property insurance
- OFW insurance

=== Other products and services ===
- TC FuneCare, funeral services product available for all cooperative member-owners and their beneficiaries
  - Mortuary plan
  - Chapels and viewing rooms
  - Funeral coordination
  - Grief management
- TC Youth Laboratory Cooperative, school-based youth organizations affiliated with Tagum Cooperative aiming to train minor member-owners on the management and operations of a regular cooperative, and to encourage thrift and savings mobilization
  - School-based laboratory cooperatives
  - Aflatoun Child Social & Financial Education
  - Youth Saver Club
  - Power Teen Savers Club
  - Kiddie Balik-Eskwela Savings
  - Kiddie Birthday Savings
  - Graduation Savings
  - Movine Up Savings Enrichment (MUSE)
- TC Mobile app

== Affiliations ==
- National Confederation of Cooperatives (NATCCO)
- Mindanao Alliance of Self-help Societies- Southern Philippines Educational Cooperative Center (MASS-SPECC)
- Model Cooperative Network (MCN)
- CLIMBS Life & General Insurance Cooperative
- Credit Union Trainers for Empowernment (CUTE)
- Metro South Coop Bank
- Asian Confederation of Credit Unions (ACCU)
- One of the 15 partner co-ops in the GE Project in the Philippines that was implemented by the Asian Women in Co-operative Development Forum (AWCF) from 2010-2012, supported by the Swedish Cooperative Centre (SCC).
