= Maternal health in Rwanda =

The main aspects of maternal health are prenatal care, post-natal care, family planning and preconception.

Rwanda has successfully institutionalised results-based financing (RBF) to improve prenatal care in several of the country's provinces.

== Institutional Delivery ==
Institutional delivery helps to reduce infant mortality rate. According to UNICEF, institutional delivery coverage is 69% in 2006–2010 in Rwanda.
