= Birth attendant =

Health professional

A birth attendant, also known as skilled birth attendant, is a health professional who provides basic and emergency care to women and their newborns during pregnancy, childbirth and the postpartum period. A birth attendant, who may be a midwife, physician, obstetrician, or nurse, is trained to be present at ("attend") childbirth, whether the delivery takes place in a health care institution or at home, to recognize and respond appropriately to medical complications, and to implement interventions to help prevent them in the first place, including through prenatal care. Different birth attendants are able to provide different levels of care.

== Types of midwives ==
There are five different types of midwives. There is a certified nurse-midwife who must obtain a high level of education, either bachelors or masters in midwifery, after becoming a nurse. Nurse-midwives can serve in most birthing centers, hospitals, and can have a private home birth practice.

Then there is a Certified Professional Midwife. This midwife can obtain a license by following an apprenticeship/internship style of learning, along with other certifications. She must pass a board exam through states/countries that allow for this license and can only be available in a home birth setting.

There are Direct Entry Midwives. These midwives are trained through an apprenticeship/internship process and are only allowed in home birth settings as well. They do not hold a professional license but rather serve as lay midwives wherever they are needed.

The next type is a traditional midwife. This midwife often has cultural and community based trainings that are passed down through generations. Depending on the location, they can either be formally certified and licensed or not.

The final type of midwife is a lay midwife. A lay midwife are individuals that have learned midwifery through an apprenticeship or a self-directed study rather than a formal training. They are able to provide care and deliver babies outside of a medical setting.

== Birth attendant versus birth assistant ==
A distinction must be made between "birth attendant" and others who may provide support and care during pregnancy and childbirth, based on professional training and skills, practice regulations, as well as nature of care delivered. Birth attendants are typically trained to perform clinical functions for basic and emergency obstetric and neonatal care, including administration of parenteral antibiotics, oxytocics and anticonvulsants; manual removal of placenta; removal of retained products of placenta; assisted vaginal delivery; and newborn resuscitation. Depending on the legal scope of practice, this may also include performing cesarean sections.

A birth assistant, also known as a doula, "birth worker", "labor support person", "labour coach", or "childbirth educator", is someone other than the above who provides emotional support and general care and advice to women and families during pregnancy and childbirth. A doula usually offers support services to the family in the weeks following the birth ("postpartum doula", see Postpartum confinement) and may also assist during labor and childbirth ("birth doula").

In many developing countries, a traditional birth attendant, also known as a traditional midwife, is a person who provide basic pregnancy and birthing care and advice based primarily on experience and knowledge acquired informally through the traditions and practices of the communities where they originated. They usually have no modern health care training and are not typically subject to professional regulation.

== See also ==
- Maternal health
- Reproductive health
