= Traditional birth attendant =

Person who provides maternity care informally

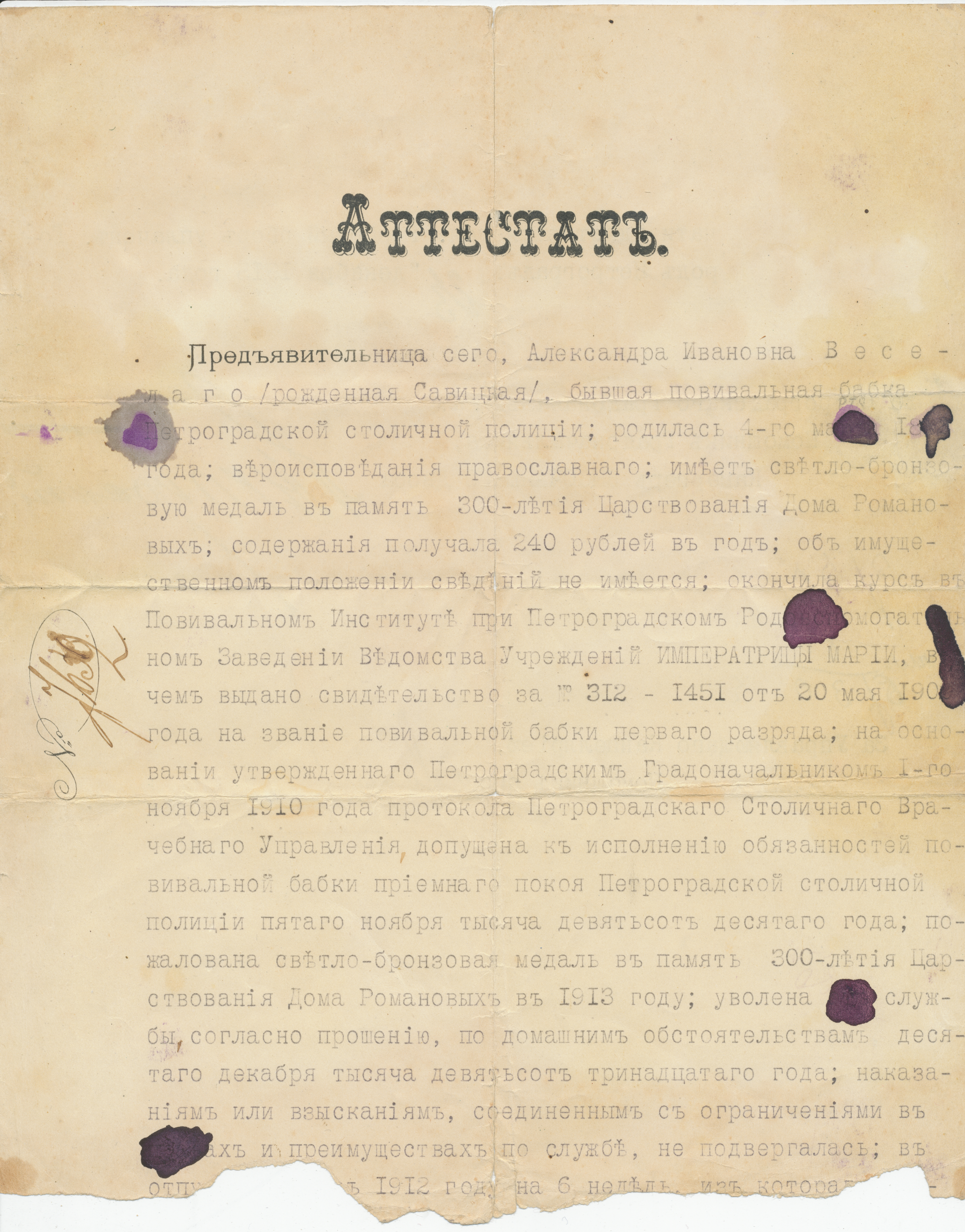
A midwife’s certificate from Russia (1913)

A traditional birth attendant (TBA), also known as a traditional midwife, community midwife or lay midwife, is a pregnancy and childbirth care provider. Traditional birth attendants provide the majority of primary maternity care in many developing countries, and may function within specific communities in developed countries.

Traditional midwives provide basic health care, support and advice during and after pregnancy and childbirth, based primarily on experience and knowledge acquired informally through the traditions and practices of the communities where they originated. They usually work in rural, remote and other medically underserved areas. TBAs may not receive formal education and training in health care provision, and there are no specific professional requisites such as certification or licensure. A traditional birth attendant may have been formally educated and has chosen not to register. They often learn their trade through apprenticeship or are self-taught; in many communities one of the criteria for being accepted as a TBA by clients is experience as a mother. Many traditional midwives are also herbalists, or other traditional healers. They may or may not be integrated in the formal health care system. They sometimes serve as a bridge between the community and the formal health system, and may accompany women to health facilities for delivery.

== Training and focus of work ==
Traditional birth attendants are often older women, respected in their communities. They consider themselves as private health care practitioners who respond to requests for service. The focus of their work is to assist women during delivery and immediately post-partum. Frequently their assistance includes helping with household chores. Women may see a TBA to treat problems with infertility or other reproductive health issues as well.

TBAs may not have any formal training on how to attend pregnant women. Many are highly experienced in well woman care including how to recognize and respond appropriately to complications of pregnancy. It is a matter of discussion whether the lack of education in some TBAs and the way many attend deliveries are risky for the mothers and their babies. Evaluating the impact of these traditional practitioners on health outcomes requires taking into consideration additional factors such as poverty, availability of health services, or institutional support.

It is being increasingly recognized that TBAs may have a role to play in improving health outcomes in developing countries because of their access to communities and the relationships they share with women in local communities, especially if women are unable to access skilled care. Some countries, training institutes and non-governmental agencies are initiating efforts to train TBAs in basic and emergency obstetric care, family planning, and other maternal health topics, in order to enhance the links between modern health care services and the community, and to improve the chances for better health outcomes among mothers and babies. There is little evidence of large-scale effectiveness of targeted intervention programmes for training TBAs, as they are rarely integrated within a general strategy for improving maternal and child care.

== Integration into healthcare systems in developing countries ==
Historically, Traditional Birth Attendants (TBA) have operated outside of the formal healthcare delivery structure. TBA training has been used as a means of extending health services to underserved communities in developing nations in hopes of decreasing mortality and morbidity. While the focus in the past two decades has been on training TBAs, studies on training impact has shown conflicting results in maternal outcomes with many studies showing little to no impact on high maternal mortality outcomes. As a result, there has been a shift toward skilled birth attendants, capable of averting and managing complications.

TBAs have been unsuccessful in handling obstetric complications, but have contributed to successful maternal, neonatal, and child health interventions, although there is insufficient evidence that TBA training improves peri-neonatal mortality. The key piece missing in TBA training is an adequate referral system, which allows TBAs to use their close ties with the community to link pregnant women to skilled birth attendants (SBA).

The effectiveness of TBA referrals to health facilities is dependent on the healthcare system's ability to support an increase in services provided and the supervision needed to support TBA integration.

"Five mechanisms for TBA integration were identified: training and supervision of TBAs; collaboration skills for health workers; inclusion of TBAs in facility-based activities; systems for communication between TBAs and SBAs; and defining roles for TBAs and SBAs."

While these mechanisms are important, complementary activities also influenced TBA referral and integration success: "careful selection of TBAs; community participation; health system development; and affordability changes." TBA's must be provided with appropriate knowledge, easy access to health personnel, and quality and regular supervision; all three components enable training to become a tool for TBA integration into the healthcare system. The referral training for TBAs allows them to act as "intermediaries between the community and the formal health care system." Training that advocates collaboration and regular involvement in clinic duties, increases the number of referrals and improves communication.

The World Health Organization's Strategies and Interventions for Obstetric Referrals:

- An adequately resourced referral facility.
- Communications and feedback systems.
- Designated transport.
- Protocols for identifying complications that are specific to the setting.
- Personnel trained in the use of these protocols
- Teamwork between referral levels.
- A unified records system.
- Mechanisms to ensure that patients do not bypass levels

== Tools to improve communication and transportation to maternal health facilities ==
"Most maternal deaths from direct causes (such as hemorrhage, obstructed labor, infections, eclampsia, or unsafe abortions) could be prevented if women received timely care at critical moments." On average, half of deliveries in the developing world have a skilled birth attendant present. With many deliveries outside of the health center, and an estimated 9-15% of deliveries requiring intervention, access to transportation and communication are critical to improve maternal and infant outcomes. Major contributing factors to maternal death are: "delay in recognizing danger signs, deciding to seek care, reaching care, and receiving care at health facilities".

=== Transportation programs ===
Malawi: Communities have employed bicycle ambulances and oxcarts to transport pregnant women to health facilities. There were issues during the rainy season. The program later added ambulances, targeted information, education, maternity waiting, and focused education activities for decision makers in the family. The maternity waiting homes were rare because they required funds collected by the community.

Sierra Leone: The Ministry of Health used a radio system in conjunction with four-wheel-drive vehicles. This program has seen success. The program increased emergency referrals and the case fatality dropped.

Uganda:

- Stationing two ambulances at a referral facility was not effective. Communication and lack of planning for fuel price hikes and shortages were cited as the causes for poor results.
- UNFPA used four-wheel-drive vehicles, a designated referral point and a standard for referral care. Reports of fuel shortages threaten the success of the program.

Honduras: Improved roads, communication, ambulances, and increased staffing and equipment increased referrals and reduced maternal mortality.

Sri Lanka: The Sri Lankan government provided three to five ambulances at each hospital. The program gave health workers the authority to organize, pay, and receive reimbursement for privately organized transportation.

Nigeria: Community leaders negotiated a contract with a local bus union to transport women with obstetric emergencies. The drivers received training and were reimbursed for fuel by a community fund. In the event of a death police and local authorities were made aware of the arrangement, so that bus drivers would not be held liable.

West Africa: Some countries in West Africa use a yellow flag as a signal to passing drivers that a laboring woman is in distress. Willing drivers stop and transport the woman to a health facility.

=== Communication programs ===
Uganda: UNFPA provides TBAs with solar-powered VHF-radio that connects directly to the health provider, walkie-talkies for TBAs, and ambulance services. UNFPA has reported success. UNFPA stresses the importance of both communication and transportation to improve service delivery of maternal health services.

Sierra Leone: Health staff used a two-way radio to communicate with other facilities to improve referrals and alert staff of their arrival and situation. A solar powered system worked better than a battery charged system. Communication difficulties were experienced in mountainous regions. Health centers resolved this issue by communicating to closer centers, which then communicated the message to the desired destination.

==== Promising techniques to resolve both communication and transportation barriers to care ====
- "Techniques to reduce or eliminate costs of obstetrical referrals (including transport subsidies, community emergency transport schemes and funds, and community or individual prepayment schemes )."
- "Maternity waiting homes."
- "Birth-emergency plans (also known as birth-preparedness/complication-readiness plans)."

== Lay midwifery in developed countries ==
In developed countries, some traditional or lay midwives are becoming increasingly vocal in support of their right to practice without formal regulation, advocating for a woman's right to choose her place of birth and birth attendants. They see their role to include promoting change in societal attitudes towards birth, and favouring the "art" of midwifery founded on maternal or compassionate instincts, rather than over-medicalization of this natural event.

== See also ==
- Birth attendant
- Maternal health
- Unlicensed assistive personnel
