= Makkah Chamber of Commerce and Industry =

The Makkah Chamber of Commerce & Industry (MCCI) is a semi-government organization that regulates and serves the business community in Makkah. The MCCI was established by a royal decree dated January 1947.

The MCCI opened their own building in 2013.
