= National Confederation of Cooperatives =

Cooperative federation in the Philippines

The National Confederation of Cooperatives (NATCCO) is the largest cooperative federation in the Philippines with 760 member cooperatives and Non-governmental Organizations NGO in 77 Provinces and 130 Cities and Municipalities as of June 2015.

== History ==
The National Confederation of Cooperatives (NATCCO) was organized by credit union pioneers in the Philippines who believed that the task of co-op development lies primarily in the hands of the private sector. As early as the 1950s to 70s, co-op sector leaders were aware that in order to succeed they could not rely on government alone. Instead, co-ops have to be driven and patronized by their members and it is only through co-op education that this level of member patronage and responsibility can be established.

In the 1950s to 70s, a large number of primary co-operatives formed five regional co-op training centers (secondary cooperatives). In 1977, the five regional training centers formed NATCCO, then known as the National Association of Training Centers for Co-operatives, to coordinate the training and educational services for cooperatives at the national level. NATCCO also served as the voice of co-ops in the country.

In response to the growing needs of primary co-op affiliates, in 1986 NATCCO was transformed into a multi-service national co-op federation while the regional training centers were transformed into multi-service co-op development centers. The acronym NATCCO was retained and its meaning converted to the present, National Confederation of Cooperatives.

== Members ==
- (MASS-SPECC) Mindanao Alliance Self-help Societies-Southern Philippines Educational Cooperative Center
- 4HG (For His Glory) Multipurpose Cooperative
- 4k Marketing Cooperative
- Abra Diocesan Teachers and Employees Multi-Purpose Cooperative (ADTEMPCO)
- Abra Farmers and Provincial Employees Multipurpose Cooperative (AFPEMCO)
- Abrasa Multi-Purpose Cooperative
- Abreco Employees Multipurpose Cooperative (ABREMPCO)
- ABS-CBN Rank & File Employees Multi-Purpose Cooperative (ARFEMC)
- Abulog Teachers & Employees Multi-purpose Cooperative
- Abuyog St. Francis Xavier Credit Cooperative (AFCCO)
- ACDI Multi-Purpose Cooperative (ACDI)
- Agdao Multi-Purpose Cooperative
- Agra Progreso Multipurpose Cooperative
- Agrarian Reform Beneficiaries & Developers Multi-Purpose Cooperative (ARBD MPCO)
- Agricultural Community Credit Cooperative
- Agricultural Development Workers & Employees Multi-Purpose Cooperative (ADWEMPC)
- Agrizkaya Cooperative Federation
- Aguinaldo Pomhochan Multi-Purpose Cooperative
- Aguipo Coconut Farmers Multi-Purpose Cooperative
- Agusan del Norte Teachers, Retirees, Employees and Community Cooperative (ANTRECCO)
- Alaminos Credit Cooperative
- Alang sa Tanan Multi-purpose cooperative
- Alejandro Go Beltran (AGB) Foundation
- Alfonso Lista Development Cooperative
- Alicia Local Government Employees Cooperative
- Alicia Neighborhood and Municipal Employee Livelihood MPC (ANMELCO)
- Alilem Multi-Purpose Cooperative
- Alilem Samahang Nayon Tribal Multipurpose Cooperative
- Alima Credit Cooperative
- Alipao Multi-Purpose Cooperative (ALMUCO)
- AL-ISLAH People's Economic Multipurpose Cooperative (Al-Islah)
- Almeria Seafarers Multi-purpose Cooperative
- Amcha Multipurpose Cooperative
- Angat Development & Credit Cooperative
- Angono Credit and Development Coop (ACDECO)
- Antique Provincial Gov't Employees MPC
- Apalit Small Christian Communities Multipurpose Cooperative (ASCCOM)
- Apo Macote Primary Multi Purpose Cooperative
- Apung Monica de Minalin Multi-Purpose Cooperative
- Arya Coconut Farmers Multi-Purpose Cooperative
- Asensado Savings & Credit Cooperative
- Asiapro Multi-Purpose Cooperative
- ASKI Multi-Purpose Cooperative
- Asosasyon sa Nagkahiusang Lumulupyo sa San Roque (ANALUMBRO) MPC
- Aurora Integrated Multi-Purpose Cooperative
- Baao Parish Multi-Purpose Cooperative
- Bacarra Savings and Credit Cooperative
- Bacayan Multi-Purpose Cooperative
- Bacbacan Multi-Purpose Cooperative
- Baclay Multi-Purpose Cooperative
- Bacolod City Credit Cooperative (BACCCoop)
- Bafaventra Multi-Purpose Cooperative (BMPC)
- Baggak ti Daya Development Cooperative
- Bagong Silang 2 Multi-Purpose Cooperative
- Baguio Entrepreneurs Credit Cooperative (BEC Co-op)
- Bahong Multipurpose Cooperative
- Balamban Community Multi-purpose Cooperative
- Balay Mindanaw Foundation Inc.
- Balugo Farmers Multi-Purpose Cooperative (BFMPC)
- Bambang Grains, Fruits And Vegetable Growers Multi-Purpose Cooperative
- Bangon Yanong Igsoon Haligi ka sa Nasod (Bohol BAYANIHAN) Multi-Purpose Cooperative
- Bansalan Cooperative Society (BCS Credit Cooperative)
- Bantolinao Farmers Multipurpose Cooperative
- Barbaza Multipurpose Cooperative
- Barcelona Development Cooperative
- Barcelona Water Service Development Cooperative
- Barotac Nuevo Development Cooperative
- Basak-Layog Agricultural Multi-Purpose Cooperative (BLAMCI)
- Basey I District Multipurpose Cooperative
- Batong Paloway Producers Cooperative
- Batu Farmers Multipurpose Cooperative
- Bauan Doctors Multi-Purpose Cooperative
- Bauangeños Credit Cooperative
- Baug CARP Beneficiaries Multipurpose Cooperative
- Bayanihan Hundred Islands Agrarian Reform Cooperative
- Bayanihan Multipurpose Cooperative
- Bayawan Community Cooperative
- Bayawan Multi-Purpose Agricultural Kilusang Bayan
- Belison Multi-Purpose Cooperative
- Benabaye Multipurpose Cooperative
- Benguet State University Multipurpose Cooperative (BSU MPC)
- Biatungan Multipurpose Cooperative
- Bicol Federation of Dairy Cooperative (BFDC)
- Bicol Parole and Probation Administration Employees Credit Cooperative
- Bicol Transport Service Cooperative Federation (BITSCOFED)
- Big Daddy Credit Cooperative
- Bigay Buhay MPC (BBMC)
- Binalbagan Multi-Purpose Cooperative
- Binangonan Development Cooperative (BIDECO)
- Biocare Multipurpose Cooperative
- Birhen ng Bayan ng San Mateo Multipurpose Cooperative
- Bislig City Gov't Employees Multipurpose Cooperative
- Bohol Community Multi-Purpose Cooperative
- Bohol DAR Employees Multi-purpose Cooperative (BODARE MPC)
- Bohol Diocesan Multi-Purpose Cooperative
- Bohol Vendors Multipurpose Cooperative (BOVEMCO)
- Bol-anon Savings and Credit Cooperative (BOSCCO)
- Bonbonon Farmers Multipurpose Cooperative (BOFARMPUCO)
- Bontoc Multipurpose Cooperative
- Boracay Land Transport Multipurpose Cooperative
- Buenavista Development Cooperative
- Bugasong Multipurpose Cooperative
- Buhi Rural Waterworks and Sanitation Multipurpose Cooperative
- Bukas Palad Multipurpose Cooperative
- Bukidnon Development Multipurpose Cooperative
- Bukidnon Government Employees Multipurpose Cooperative (BUGEMCO)
- Bukidnon Integrated Planters Multipurpose Cooperative (BIP MPC)
- Bukidnon Transport Multi-Purpose Cooperative (BUKTRAMCO)
- Buklod Multipurpose Cooperative
- Buklod ng Buhay Savings and Credit Cooperative (BBSCC)
- Buklod Unlad Multipurpose Cooperative
- Bukluran Multipurpose Cooperative
- Bulacan Federation of Cooperatives
- Bureau of Jail Management & Penology Multi-Purpose Cooperative (BJMP-MPC)
- Butuan Habitat Development Cooperative
- Cabatuan Immanuel Multi-Purpose Cooperative
- Cabucgayan Development Cooperative
- Cadalian Dairy Farmers Cooperative (CADAFCO)
- Cadiz City Credit Cooperative (C4)
- Cagayan Valley Dev't Coop, Inc. (CAVADECO, INC.)
- Calapan Labor Service Development cooperative (CALSEDECO)
- Calapan Vendors Multi-Purpose Cooperative
- Calindagan Multipurpose Cooperative
- Camalig (Albay) Credit Cooperative
- Camarines Norte Business Dev't Coop (CANDEVCO) (formerly CANBUDECO)
- Camarines Norte Local Resources Management Cooperative (CNLRM Coop)
- Camarines Norte State College Multi-Purpose Cooperative
- Campangga Alayon Multi-Purpose Cooperative (CAMPCO)
- CamSur Multi-Purpose Cooperative (Formerly: Capitol Multi-Purpose Cooperative)
- Candijay Teachers and Community Multi-Purpose Cooperative
- Caniogan Credit & Development Cooperative
- Capitol Employees of Bataan MPC
- Capiz Settler's Cooperative Rural Bank Inc.
- Carangian Fisherfolks and Farmers Development Cooperative
- Care Filipinos Multi-Purpose Cooperative (CFMPC)
- Carmen Multi-Purpose Cooperative
- Casandro Multipurpose Cooperative
- Casay Credit Cooperative
- Casig-Ang San Miguel Development Cooperative
- CASURECO II Employees Multi-Purpose Cooperative
- Catanauan Credit & Development Cooperative
- Catanduanes State College Multi-Purpose Cooperative
- Catholic Servants of Christ Community Multipurpose Cooperative
- Catmon Community Multi-Purpose Cooperative
- Catubig Multipurpose Cooperative (formerly PRMAC Multipurpose Cooperative)
- Cavite Farmers Feedmilling & Marketing Cooperative (CAFFMACO)
- CDUH Employees Multi-Purpose Cooperative (Cebu Doctors University Hospital)
- Cebu Federation of Dairy Cooperatives
- Cebu Market Vendors Multi-Purpose Cooperative (CEMVEDCO)
- Cebu Mitsumi Multi-purpose Cooperative
- Cebu News Workers Multipurpose Cooperative
- Cebu Peoples' Multi-Purpose Cooperative
- Cebu Tour Guides Multi-Purpose Cooperative
- Center for Assistance of Rural Entrepreneurs, Asso. Multipurpose Cooperative
- Center for Community Transformation Credit Cooperative
- Central Visayas Plant Nursery Multipurpose Cooperative
- Chevra Koinonia Credit Cooperative
- Christian Farmers Multi-Purpose Cooperative
- Claveria Agri-based Multi-Purpose Cooperative
- Claveria Grassroots Multi-Purpose Cooperative
- Coliling Farmers’ Savings and Credit Cooperative
- Comelec Employees Development Cooperative
- Community Water and Sanitation Service Cooperative (COWASSCO)
- Compostela Market Vendors Multipurpose Cooperative (COMAVEMCO)
- Consolacion Multi-Purpose Cooperative
- Coolway Multi-Purpose Cooperative (CMPC)
- COOP FUNERAL CARE- Antique
- Cooperative Bank of Agusan Del Sur
- Cooperative Bank of Agusan Norte-Butuan City
- Cooperative Bank of Camarines Norte
- Cooperative Bank of Leyte
- Cooperative of Agrarian Reform Employees (CARE)
- Cooperative Union of Iligan City
- Coop-Life Mutual Benefit Services Association (CLIMBS)
- Cordova Catholic Cooperative School
- Cordova Multi-Purpose Cooperative
- CVSCAFT Bilar Multi-Purpose Cooperative
- D.A. II Multi-Purpose Cooperative (D.A.R02 MPC)
- Dacutan Farmers Multipurpose Cooperative (DAFAMCO)
- Dagohoy Multi-Purpose Cooperative
- Dalawinon Multi-Purpose Farmers Cooperative (DMFC)
- Danao Employees Multi-Purpose Cooperative
- Danlugan Farmers Multi-Purpose Cooperative (DFMPC)
- Dao Multi-purpose Cooperative
- DAPCO Agrarian Reform Beneficiaries Cooperative (DARBCO)
- DAR Multipurpose Cooperative (DARMPC)
- Davao de Oro Credit Cooperative
- De La Salle Lipa Multi-Purpose Cooperative
- Del Rosario Multi-Purpose Cooperative
- DENR Multipurpose Cooperative
- DENRACEAE Multipurpose Cooperative
- Diamond MultiLine Cooperative
- Diffun Saranay and Development Cooperative
- Digos Market Vendors Multipurpose Cooperative
- Dinalupihan Economic Community Multipurpose Cooperative
- Dingle Government Workers Development Cooperative
- Divine Providence Multipurpose Cooperative
- Divine Word College of Legazpi Multi-Purpose Cooperative (DWCL MPC)
- DMPI Employees Agrarian Reform Benefeciaries Cooperative (DEARBC)
- Don Bosco Network Multi-Purpose Cooperative
- Don Emilio del Valle Memorial Hospital Employees Multipurpose Cooperative
- Dumangas Agrarian Reform Cooperative (DARC)
- Dumanjug Multi-Purpose Cooperative
- Dumper Transport Cooperative
- Dur-as Savings and Credit Cooperative
- Eastern Telecoms Credit Cooperative
- Eastern Visayas Cooperative Federation
- Eastern Visayas Microcredit and Multi-Service Cooperative
- Echo MultiPurpose Cooperative
- El Grande Multi-Purpose Cooperative
- Emmanuel Multi-purpose Cooperative
- Epiphany Multi-Purpose Cooperative (EMPC)
- Esperanza Multi-purpose Cooperative
- Excellent People's Multi-Purpose Cooperative
- Fairchild Cebu Community Credit Cooperative, Inc. (F4C)
- Fairdeal Multipurpose Cooperative
- Family of Light Producer's Cooperative
- Fast Mover Multi Purpose Cooperative
- Fatima Multipurpose Cooperative (Leyte)
- Fatima Multi-Purpose Cooperative (Vigan)
- Federation of Cooperatives in Mindanao (FEDCO)
- Federation of Davao Dairy Farmers Cooperatives (FEDDAFC)
- Financial Transformation Center Credit Cooperative
- First Consolidated Cooperative Along Tañon Seabords (FCCT)
- Five Star Savings Credit Development Cooperative
- Fonus Cebu Federation of Cooperatives
- Fonus Cooperative
- Fonus Federation of Cooperatives in Socsksargen
- Foundation for Agrarian Reform Cooperatives in Mindanao, Inc. (FARMCOOP)
- Gabay sa Kalamboan Microfinance Cooperative
- Ganano Communal Irrigators Multi-Purpose Cooperative
- Gardenia Kapitbisig Multi-Purpose and Transport Services Cooperative
- Gasan Vendors Multipurpose Cooperative
- Gata Daku Multi-Purpose Cooperative (GDMPC)
- General Mariano Alvarez Services Cooperative (GEMASCO)
- General Mariano Alvarez Transport Service & Multi-purpose Cooperative
- Giporlos Credit Cooperative
- Global Skills Providers MPC (GLOBALPRO)
- GMA Multipurpose Cooperative
- GMA Vendors Development Cooperative
- GMA_Muslim Christian Alliance Traders Savings & Credit Cooperative
- GMA-7 Employees Multipurpose Cooperative
- GMAT Multipurpose & Transport Service Cooperative
- Good Samaritan Multi-purpose Cooperative
- Government Employees Multi-Purpose Cooperative of Alcoy (GEMCA)
- Government of Laoag Employees Development Cooperative (GLEDCO)
- GP - 125 Golden Pance Irrigators Service Cooperative
- Greater Midsayap Multi-Purpose Cooperative
- Greeners Credit Cooperative
- Gubat St. Anthony Cooperative (GSAC)
- Guimaras Brethren Multi-Purpose Cooperative (GBMPC)
- Guimaras Multi-purpose Cooperative
- Guimaras OFWs Multi-Purpose Cooperative (GOFWS-MPC)
- Guimbal Development Cooperative (GUIDECO)
- Hamtic Multi-purpose cooperative
- Hatdannay Multipurpose Cooperative
- Highlander Agrarian Reform Beneficiaries MPC (HARBEMCO)
- Hijo Employees’ Agrarian Reform Beneficiaries’ Cooperative-2 (HEARBCO-2)
- Hilltop Mansion Multipurpose Cooperative
- Hilongos Multi-Purpose Cooperative
- Hojap Multi-Purpose Cooperative
- HOLCIM Multi-Purpose Cooperative
- Holy Child Multi-Purpose Cooperative
- House of Representatives Multi-Purpose Cooperative
- Ibabao Multi-purpose Cooperative
- IDEA Multi-Purpose Cooperative
- Ifugao Global Entrepreneurs Multi-Purpose Cooperative
- Igcocolo Primary Multi-Purpose Cooperative
- Iligan Cement Multi-Purpose Cooperative
- Iligan Dealers Multi-purpose Cooperative
- Iligan Light Employees Multi-Purpose Cooperative (ILEMPCO)
- Ilocos Sur Upland Developer's Cooperative
- Iloilo City Public School Teachers and Employees Multi-Purpose Cooperative (ICPSTEMPC)
- Iloilo Provincial Employees and Community Multi-Purpose Cooperative (IPECMPC)
- IMCO Multi-Purpose Cooperative
- Imelda Mun'l Employees & Entrepreneur Multi-Purpose Cooperative (IEEMCO)
- Immaculate Conception Parish Development Cooperative
- Immaculate Heart of Mary Multipurpose Cooperative
- Immanuel Partners Multipurpose Cooperative (IPAMCO)
- Impasugong Samahang Nayon Multi-Purpose Cooperative
- Imus Vendors Development Cooperative
- Indanan Municipal Employees Multi-purpose Cooperative
- Infanta Credit and Development Cooperative
- Inner City Development Cooperative
- Ipil Consumers Multi-Purpose Cooperative
- Irosin Market Vendors and Farmers Development Cooperative
- Isabel Bay Multipurpose Cooperative
- Isabela Community Multi-Purpose Cooperative
- Iwahori Multi-Purpose Cooperative
- Jobnet Service Cooperative
- Jobs 4 All Multipurpose Cooperative
- Jollibee Foods Corporation Employees Multi-Purpose Cooperative
- Jose Panganiban Primary Hospital Service Cooperative
- Judean Multi-Purpose Cooperative
- Kabalikat Multi-purpose Cooperative
- Kabalikat Para sa Diyos at Bayan Multi-Purpose Cooperative (KADBAYAN MPC)
- Kabalikat sa Kaunlaran Service Cooperative (KASAKA SERVICE COOP)
- Kabangasan-Mapua-Dahilig ARC Coop (KAMADA ARC COOP)
- Kabankalan Government Employees Multi-Purpose Cooperative
- Kabisig Multi-Purpose & Transport Service Cooperative
- Kahugpungan sa mga Igsoong Naglawig sa Kalamboan
- Kakuyo Multi-purpose Cooperative
- Kalikasan Multipurpose Cooperative
- Kamanepla Multipurpose Cooperative
- Kangara Multipurpose Cooperative
- Kapatiran MultiPurpose Cooperative
- Kasarinlan Development Cooperative
- Kasibu Farmers and Development Cooperative
- Kasilak Multipurpose Cooperative
- Katilingbanong Programa sa Maayong Panglawas-Kinaugalingong Paningkamot Multi-Purpose Cooperative (KPMP-KPMPC)
- Kaunlad Multi-Purpose Cooperative
- Kaunlaran Sa Kanayunan Credit Cooperative (KASAKA)
- Kauswagan Agrarian Reform Benefeciaries Multi-Purpose Cooperative (KARBEMPCO)
- Kauyagan Savers Cooperative
- Kawasan Nature Park Multi-purpose Cooperative
- KFI Center for Community Development
- Kiamba Municipal Employees Cooperative
- Kiangan Community Multipurpose & Development Cooperative
- Kisandal Savings and Credit Cooperative (KSCC)
- Kitanglad Multi-purpose Cooperative
- Kooperatiba Naton
- Kooperatiba ng Nagkakaisang Mamamayan sa Lalawigan ng Quezon Multi-Purpose Cooperative (KOOPNAMAN MPC)
- Kooperatiba ng Sambayanan ng Banal na Krus (KSBanK)
- Kooperatiba Para sa Kaunlaran ng Lagonoy (KKL)
- Kooperatibang Likas ng Nueva Ecija
- La Castellana 1 Personnel MPC (LC1PMPC)
- La Libertad Agrarian Reform Beneficiaries Multipurpose Cooperative - LARBECO (formerly-LAMPCO)
- La Libertad Women's Balikatan Multipurpose Cooperative
- La Trinidad Vegetables Trading Post MultiPurpose Cooperative
- La Union Ladies Multi-Purpose Cooperative
- Labo Progressive Multipurpose Cooperative
- Lagawe Multipurpose Development Cooperative
- Laguan Multi-purpose cooperative
- Lahing Pilipino Multipurpose and Transport Service Cooperative
- Lamac Multi-Purpose Cooperative
- Lambunao Government Employees Multi-Purpose Cooperative
- Lamitan Agrarian Reform Beneficiaries Cooperative
- Lamut Grass Roots Savings and Development Cooperative (LAGSADECO)
- Lanang Multipurpose Cooperative
- Landbank Employees Credit Cooperative (LBECC)
- Lapuyan Multi-Purpose Cooperative
- Laua-an Multipurpose Cooperative
- LCC-Daet MPCI
- LCC-Iriga MPCI
- LCC-K MPCI
- Leganes Community Development Program Multi-Purpose Cooperative (LCDP-MPC)
- Legazpi City Government Employees Welfare Association Multi-Purpose Cooperative
- Leon Small Coconut Farmers Multipurpose Cooperative (LESCOFAMPCO)
- Libagon Area MPC
- Libmanan Community Development Cooperative
- Libungan National Employees Multi-Purpose Cooperative
- Lico Agrarian Reform Beneficiaries Multi-Purpose Cooperative (LICARB MPC)
- Lide Employees Development Cooperative
- Lifegiver Multipurpose Cooperative
- Ligas Kooperatibang Bayan Sa Pagpapaunlad
- Limbahan Small Coconut Farmers and Women Multi-Purpose Cooperative (LIMSCOFARMCO)
- Lingayen Catholic Credit Cooperative (LCCC)
- Lodlod Multi-Purpose Cooperative
- Lorenzo Tan Multi-Purpose Cooperative (LTMPC)
- Lourdes Multi-purpose Cooperative (formerly Lourdes Women Multi-purpose Cooperative)
- Lucena Retailers Multi-Purpose Cooperative
- Lupi Multi-Purpose Cooperative
- Ma. Aurora Tree Farmers Multipurpose Cooperative
- Maasin Community Multipurpose Cooperative (MCCI)
- Maasin Employees Multipurpose Cooperative
- Macario Primary Multipurpose Cooperative
- Maco Development Cooperative (MADECO)
- Maddela Auto Savings Multi-Purpose Cooperative
- Maddela Integrated Farmers Savings Development Cooperative
- Magarao Multi-Purpose Cooperative
- Magsaysay Farmers Multi-Purpose Cooperative
- Malabing Valley Multi-Purpose Cooperative
- Malabon Central Market Dev't Cooperative
- Malambuon Multi Purpose Cooperative
- Malapatan Multi Purpose Cooperative
- Maliliit na Sambayanang Simbahan Diocesan Multipurpose Cooperative (MSSD MPC)
- Mambajao Credit Cooperative
- Mandaluyong High School Multi-Purpose Cooperative
- Mandaue City Market Vendors Multi-Purpose Cooperative (MAVENCO)
- Manggagawa Ni San Jose Multi-Purpose Cooperative (MSJMPC)
- Manguyang Agrarian Reform Beneficiaries Cooperative (MARBECO)
- Mansalay Agriculture and Fisheries Development Cooperative
- Mantacida United Farmers Multi -Purpose Cooperative
- Maramag Community Multi-Purpose Cooperative
- Maranding Women Investors Multi-Purpose Cooperative
- Maria Aurora Development Cooperative (MADECO)
- Marinduque Social Action Multipurpose Cooperative (MASAMCO)
- Maripipi Multi-Purpose Cooperative (MMPC)
- Maritime Multi-Purpose Cooperative (MMPC)
- Mariveles Women's Multipurpose Cooperative (MWMPC)
- Mary Immaculate Concepcion Multi-Purpose Cooperative
- Masbate Multi-Purpose Cooperative (MMPC)
- Masisit-Dacal Livelihood Cooperative (MASCOOP)
- Maydolong Development Multipurpose Cooperative
- Maymatan Farmers Multi-Purpose Cooperative
- Mediatrix Multi-Purpose Cooperative
- Mega Realm Housing Cooperative
- Mehitabel Employees Multipurpose Cooperative
- Mérida Agricultural Development Services Multi-purpose Cooperative
- Metro Ormoc Community Cooperative (OCCI)
- Metro Paypayad Multi-Purpose Cooperative
- Metropolitan Naga Water District Employees Multi-Purpose Cooperative (MWDEMPC)
- Micro-Entrepreneurs Multi-Purpose Cooperative
- Midsalip Farmers Multi-Purpose Cooperative
- Minaba Multi-Purpose Cooperative
- Mindanao Coalition of Development NGO Networks (MINCODE)
- Mindanao Savings Cooperative (MINSAVE)
- Mindanao State University-Iligan Institute of Technology Multi-Purpose Cooperative (MSU-IIT MPC)
- Mindoro Progressive Multi-Purpose Cooperative
- Mo. Bonifacia Workers Credit Coop.
- Moncada Women's Credit Cooperative (MWCC)
- Morong Kabalikat Multi-Purpose Cooperative
- Mother Rita Multi-Purpose Cooperative (MORIMC)
- MSU-Sulu Multi-purpose Cooperative
- Multi-Agri-Forest and Community Development Cooperative
- Municipal Employees of Tigaon Development Cooperative
- Murphy Development Cooperative
- N.E. Association of Persons with Disability Primary Multipurpose Cooperative
- Nabua Development Multipurpose Cooperative
- Nagkahiusang Mag-uuma Sa Guinhalinan Cooperative (NAGMASAGUICO)
- Nagkakaisang Lakas Multi-Purpose Cooperative
- NAGKASAMA Multi-Purpose Cooperative
- Nam-ay Ti Umili, Inc.
- Namria Multi-Purpose Cooperative (NMPC)
- Nasugbu Municipal Employees Multi-Purpose Cooperative (NHEMPC)
- National Federation of Cooperatives of Persons With Disability
- National Savings & Homes Cooperative
- National Teachers & Employees Coop bank
- Naval Community Credit Cooperative
- NEC Multipurpose Cooperative (NEC Financial)
- New Galerian Businessmen's Credit Cooperative
- New Jireh Pharmacy, Distributor and Multi-purpose cooperative
- News Multipurpose Cooperative
- Next Level Training and Advocacy Cooperative
- NGPI-ARB Multi-Purpose Cooperative (NGPI-ARB MPC)
- Norkis Credit Cooperative
- North South Alliance Multi-Purpose Cooperative (NOSAMCO)
- Northern Bukidnon Transport Service Cooperative (NOBTSCO)
- Northern Quezon Parents-Teachers Multi-purpose Cooperative
- Northern Quezon Savings and Credit Cooperative (NORQUESAC)
- Northern Samar Development Workers Community Cooperative (NSDWCC)
- Notre Dame of Jolo Multi-Purpose Cooperative (ND Jolo- MPC)
- Notre Dame of Marbel University Employees Development Cooperative (NDMU COOP)
- Novaliches Development Cooperative (NOVADECI)
- Nueva Era Multi-Purpose Cooperative
- Nueva Segovia Consortium of Cooperatives (NSCC)
- Nueva Vizcaya Alay Kapwa Multi Purpose Cooperative
- Nueva Vizcaya Multi-Purpose Medical Cooperative
- NutriWealth Multi-Purpose Cooperative
- Office of the Secretary of Justice Employees' Multi-Purpose Cooperative
- OFW Savings and Loans Cooperative
- Old Central Multi-Purpose Cooperative
- Old Sta. Mesa Savings and Credit Cooperative
- Olongapo Multi-purpose Cooperative
- Olongapo Subic Castillejos San MarcelinoTransport Service and Multipurpose Cooperative (OSCSMTSMPC)
- Omaganhan Farmers Multi-purpose Cooperative
- Ormoc Vendors MPC (ORVEMPCO)
- Oro Integrated Cooperative
- Oro Savings & Sharing Cooperative (OSSC)
- Oton Municipal Government Employees Multi-Purpose Cooperative
- Our Lady of Fatima Credit Cooperative
- Our Lady of Grace Credit Cooperative
- Ozamiz City People's Multi-Purpose Cooperative (The People's Bank)
- Paco-Soriano Pandacan Development Cooperative
- Pag-asa Multi-Purpose Cooperative (PMPC)
- Pag-inupdanay Incorporated
- Paglaum Multi-Purpose Cooperative
- Palapag Teachers, Employees & Community Multi-Purpose Cooperative
- Palompon Community Credit Cooperative
- Pamana Credit Cooperative
- Pamilya Kooperatiba Credito de Cebu
- Panabo Multi-Purpose Cooperative
- Panay Agrarian Reform Coop - PARECO (Formerly: Mapili ARB's Multipurpose Cooperative)
- Pandan Multi-Purpose Cooperative
- Pangasinan Savings and Credit Cooperative (PASCOOP)
- Pantok Multi-purpose Cooperative
- Pantukan Chess Club Cooperative (PCC)
- PASAR Employees Multi-Purpose Cooperative
- Pasay Public Market Multi-purpose Cooperative
- Pasig City Employees Multi-Purpose Cooperative
- Passi City Employees Multi-Purpose Cooperative (PACEMCO)
- Patnongon Multipurpose Cooperative
- Pavia Entrepreneurs Multi-Purpose Cooperative
- Payompon Development Cooperative (PADECO)
- PCCCI Cooperative Development Center
- Pecuaria Development Cooperative (PDCi)
- People Like Us Multi-Purpose Cooperative (atin ito tol - luv ko to)
- People's Multi-Purpose Cooperative
- Perlas ng Silangan Multipurpose Cooperative
- Perpetual Help Community Cooperative (PHCCI-Dumaguete City)
- Perpetual Help Credit Cooperative (PHCCI-Tacloban City)
- Pfizer Inc., Credit Cooperative
- PHELARMA Credit Cooperative
- Philex Mines Community Consumers' Cooperative (PMCCCO)
- Philhealth Kapamilya Multi-Purpose Cooperative
- Philippine Air Traffic Controllers' Multi-Purpose Cooperative (PATCOMC)
- Philippine Army Finance Center Producers Integrated Cooperative (PAFCPIC)
- Philippine Court Employees and Retirees Multi-Purpose Cooperative (PCERMPC)
- Pili Market Development Cooperative
- Pinaglabanan Credit Cooperative
- Pingkian Community Development Cooperative, Inc.
- Pintuyan National Vocational School Multipurpose Cooperative (PNVS MPC)
- Pototan Teachers and Employees Multi-Purpose (PTE MPC)
- President Roxas Economic Development Cooperative (PREDCO)
- Productive Work Specialists Multi-Purpose Cooperative (PROWORKS)
- Providers Savings and Credit Cooperative
- Provincial Employees Multi-Purpose Cooperative (PROVIMCO)
- Provincial Union of Negros Occidental-Cooperatives (PUNO)
- PUP Student Credit and Service Cooperative
- Pusuac Multi-Purpose Cooperative
- Quezon Federation of Cooperatives
- Quezon Municipal Employees Credit Cooperative
- Quick and Fast Credit Cooperative (QFCC)
- Red Ribbon Multi-Purpose Cooperative
- Region 08 COMELEC Employees Multi-Purpose Cooperative (RECEMPCO)
- Regional Consular Office Bicol Employees Multi-Purpose Cooperative (RCOBEMPC)
- Reunited Shoemakers Multipurpose Cooperative
- Ridjiki Multi-Purpose Cooperative
- Riverside Medical Center Multi-Purpose Cooperative
- RMC Tuba Arabica Coffee Farmers Cooperative
- Ruralwide Credit Cooperative
- Rustan Employees' Credit Cooperative
- Sacred Heart Credit & Dev't Cooperative
- Sacred Heart Morning Breeze-Balintawak Multi-Purpose Cooperative (SHMBBMPC)
- Sacred Heart Savings Cooperative (formerly Galimuyod Savings and Development Cooperative)
- Sadiri-IA Multipurpose Cooperative (SIAMPUCO)
- Saint Anthony Development Cooperative (SADECO)
- Salvacion Farmers Development Cooperative (SAFADECO)
- Samahan ng kababihan para sa kaunlaran (SANGKAP MPC)
- Samahan sa Ikauunlad ng Pamayanan (SIKAP) Credit Cooperative
- Samahang Ikauunlad ng may Kapansanan Ating Palawakin Multipurpose Cooperative (SIKAP MPC)
- Samahang Magsasaka ng Brgy. Sta. Maria Multipurpose Cooperative (SAMA-SAMA MPC)
- Samal Island Multipurpose Cooperative (SIMC)
- Samar Multipurpose Cooperative (SAMICO)
- Sambahayang Kabalikat ng Bulacan Multi-Purpose Cooperative
- Sambayanang Konsti Credit Cooperative
- Sampaloc Vendors Development Cooperative
- San Dionisio Credit Cooperative (SDCC)
- San Francisco Growth Enhancement Multipurpose Cooperative (SAFRAGEMC)
- San Isidro Development Cooperative
- San Isidro Parish Multi-Purpose Cooperative
- San Joaquin Multi-Purpose Cooperative
- San Jose Water Service & Development Cooperative
- San Jose Workers Multi-purpose Cooperative
- San Juan Multi-Purpose Cooperative (SJMPC)
- San Juan Parish Multipurpose Cooperative
- San Miguel Farmers and Fishers Multipurpose Cooperative
- San Miguel Multipurpose Cooperative
- San Miguel Municipal Employees Cooperative
- San Nicolas Multi-Purpose Cooperative (SNMPC)
- San Pedro de Alcantara Kilusang Bayan sa Pagpapaunlad
- San Ramon Multi-purpose Cooperative (SRMPC)
- San Roque Parish Multipurpose Cooperative
- San Sebastian Multi Purpose Cooperative
- San Vicente Multi-Purpose Cooperative
- SANAP FARMERS MULTI PURPOSE COOPERATIVE
- Sandigan Savings and Credit Cooperative (SASCCO)
- Sanguniang Panglungsod Multi-Purpose Cooperative
- Sarangani Development Cooperative
- Self-Reliant Team Puerto Pincesa Multi-purpose Cooperative (SRT-Puerto Princesa)
- Serbiz Multi-Purpose Cooperative (SMPC)
- Serman Cooperative
- Siaton Small Coconut Farmers Multipurpose Cooperative
- Siayan Farmers Multi-Purpose Cooperative
- Sibonga Multi-Purpose Cooperative
- Simca Model Rice Cluster Multi-Purpose Cooperative (SIMCA MRC MPC)
- Sinonoc National High School Teachers & Employees Multi-Purpose Cooperative (SINAHSTEMCO)
- Sipocot Municipal Employees Cooperative (SIMECO)
- Socorro Empowered Peoples Cooperative (SOEMCO)
- Soro-soro Ibaba Development Cooperative (SIDC)
- Sorsogon Provincial Cooperative Bank (SPCB)
- South Luzon Federation of Cooperatives
- Southern Global Services Multi-Purpose Cooperative (SGSMPC)
- Southern Leyte Employees Multi-Purpose Cooperative (SLEM)
- Southern Leyte State University Credit Cooperative (SLSU-CC)
- Springside (ARB) Irrigators and Farmers Multipurpose Cooperative (SIFAMCO)
- SRT Narra Cooperative of Palawan Multi-Purpose Cooperative (SRT-NARRA)
- SRT Digos Cooperative of Davao del Sur
- St. Catherine's Parish Multi-Purpose Cooperative
- St. John Development Cooperative (SJDC)
- St. Joseph Parish Multi-Purpose Cooperative
- St. Joseph Parish-Kayapa Multipurpose Cooperative
- St. Jude Multi-Purpose Cooperative
- St. Lucy Multi-Purpose Cooperative
- St. Martin of Tours Credit & Development Cooperative (SMTCDC)
- St. Rose of Lima Parish Multi-purpose Cooperative
- St. Vincent de Paul Multi-Purpose Cooperative
- St. Vincent Ferrer Parish Multi-purpose Cooperative
- St. Vincent Parish Credit Cooperative
- St.Jerome's Parish Credit Cooperative
- Sta. Ana Multi-Purpose Cooperative (SAMULCO)
- Sta. Catalina Credit Cooperative (SCC)
- Sta. Catalina Multi-Purpose Agricultural Cooperative (Negros Oriental)
- Sta. Catalina Multi-Purpose Cooperative (Cotabato City)
- Sta. Cruz Multipurpose Cooperative (STA.CRUZ-SARANGANI)
- Sta. Cruz Savings & Development Cooperative (SACDECO)
- Sta. Cruz Savings and Credit Cooperative (SCCC-Bulacan)
- Sta. Monica Credit Cooperative (SMCC)
- Sta. Monica of Pangantucan Multi-Purpose Cooperative
- Sto. Domingo Development Cooperative (SDCC)
- Sto. Nino Meycauayan Savings And Credit Cooperative
- Sts. Peter and Paul Multipurpose Cooperative
- Subic Bay Multi-Purpose Cooperative
- Sugpon Multipurpose Cooperative
- Sugponan Sisa Magsingal Multipurpose Cooperative
- Sugpunan Ti La Union Credit Cooperative
- Sulu Consumers Cooperative
- Suyo Multi-Purpose Cooperative
- Tabok Workers Multi-Purpose Cooperative (Mandaue City)
- Tabuk Multi-Purpose Cooperative (Kalinga)
- Tabuk OFW-Kabayan Cooperative (TAO-KA)
- Tagalog Cooperative Development Center (TAGCODEC)
- Tagbac Multi-Purpose Cooperative
- Tagudin Savings and Credit Cooperative
- Tagum Cooperative
- Talabutab Norte Primary Multi-Purpose Cooperative (TNPMPC)
- Talacogon Agro-Industrial Multi-purpose Development Cooperative (TAMDECO)
- Talisay Primary Multi-Purpose Cooperative
- Talisayon Multi-Purpose Cooperative (TAMUCO)
- Taloot Rural Waterworks and Sanitation Service Cooperative (TARWASSCO)
- Taloy Norte Farmers Multipurpose Cooperative
- Tam-an Multi-Purpose Cooperative
- Tanay Market Vendors and Community Multi-Purpose Cooperative
- Tanikala ng Pagkakaisa Multi-Purpose Cooperative (TPMCP)
- Tanjay Community Cooperative
- Tao Management Service & Multi Purpose Cooperative
- Tara Agrarian Reform Cooperative (TARC)
- Tayabas Community Multi-Purpose Cooperative
- Teachers Association of Pangasinan Multi-Purpose Cooperative (TAP MPC)
- Texins Multi-Purpose Cooperative
- Thanksgiving Multi Purpose Cooperative
- The Great Provider Multi-purpose Cooperative
- Tibud sa Katibawasan Multi-purpose Cooperative
- Timbermines Multi-Purpose Cooperative (TIMMULCO)
- Tinabangay sa Igsoong Mag-uuma Gasa ni San Isidro Multipurpose Cooperative (TIMGAS)
- TOPply Multi-Purpose Cooperative
- Tubao Credit Cooperative
- Tublasan Water and Sanitation Service Cooperative
- Tumalalud Farmers Multi-Purpose Cooperative (TFMPC)
- Tuy Market Vendors and Community Multi-Purpose Cooperative
- Ubay Water Service Cooperative (UWASCO)
- Ugnayan ng mga Kooperatiba sa Romblon (UKR)
- Ugong Savings & Credit Cooperative
- United Farmers Multi-Purpose Cooperative
- United Primary Multi-Purpose Cooperative
- University of San Carlos (USC) Credit Cooperative
- University of the Philippines School of Economics Employees Multi-Purpose Cooperative
- UPICOB Balikatan Multi-Purpose Cooperative
- Urban People's Development Cooperative
- Uson Small Coconut Farmers Multi-Purpose Cooperative
- Valenzuela Development Cooperative (VALDECO)
- Vibes Multi-Purpose Cooperative
- Victoria Agrarian Reform Cooperative
- Victorias Public School Teachers & Employees MPC
- Virgen Group Allottees, Crew & Employees Cooperative
- Watchlife Workers Multipurpose Cooperative
- Wesley Savings and Credit Cooperative
- West Visayas State University Medical Center Employees Multi-Purpose Cooperative (WVSUMCEMPC)
- Western Philippines University Credit Cooperative (PNAC)
- White Hills Multi-Purpose Cooperative
- Yearnings Outsourcing Cooperative
- Zamboanga Del Norte Federation of Agricultural Cooperative
- Zamboanga Sibugay Credit Cooperative
- Zamboanguita Development Cooperative (ZAMDECO)
- Zamboanguita Small Coconut Farmers MPC
- Zamsurgea Community Multipurpose Cooperative
- Zanorte Credit Community Cooperative
