= Josephine Elechi =

Nigerian political spouse

Chief (Mrs.) Josephine Elechi, is the chair of both the Ebonyi State Women Development Commission and Mother and Child Care Initiative.

== Early life, education and personal life ==
Elechi was born in Ebonyi State, Nigeria in 1948. She attended Covenant Primary School in Afikpo from 1954–1961. She then moved to Holy Child Secondary School in Sharon from 1962–1966. Elechi took a break from school to work at Nigeria Construction and Furniture Company from 1973–1975. Finally, she attended Enugu State University of Technology (ESUT) from 1993-2000 earning a Bachelor of Science (B.Sc.) degree. After obtaining her degree, she continued to work until her marriage.

Elechi is married to Chief Martin Elechi and has four children, three boys and one girl. Elechi is a member of the Izzi ethnic group.

== Political career ==
Since 2004, Elechi has served on the Ebonyi State Committee on Tsunami Disaster. When her husband, Martin Elechi became governor on May 29, 2007 she became more involved in political life, becoming the Chair of the Ebonyi State Women Development Commission (WDC) and Chair of the Mother and Child Care Initiative (MCCI). The Mother and Child Care Initiative (MCCI) used public and private partner sponsorships to address issues for the benefit of Ebonyi women and children.

== Mother and Child Care Initiative ==
The thematic areas of the MCCI Program include:

- Reduction of the unacceptably high maternal/neonatal mortality
- Reduction of maternal morbidities like obstetric fistula
- Early detection of breast and cervical cancer
- Girl-child education
- Youth/Women empowerment
- HIV/AIDS
- Orphan and vulnerable children (OVCs)

The overall goal of MCCI is to promote the survival of Ebonyi women and children. In 2007, a roadmap for the organization was drafted, which guided the initiative's actions through 2008 and 2009. Since 2028, many activities have been carried out since 2008 in the areas of promotion of maternal mortality, cancer, and gender-based violence, including advocacy visits, interactive forums, and meetings with The Federal Ministry of Health, UNFPA, UNICEF, USAID, Ebonyi legislators and council members, chairmen of Local Government Associations, various state ministries, and the media, among others.

A technical committee of three persons from the ministries of Health, Education, Agriculture, Youth and Sports, Women Affairs and Social Development was inaugurated to collaborate between MCCI and their ministries in order to strengthen and increase inter-sectoral collaboration and partnership.

To aid effective evaluation of the MCCI Program, a baseline survey was conducted to obtain data for subsequent evaluation of the program. To ensure accuracy of data collected, a 2-day baseline survey workshop was held to train field workers, heath and education department staff of 13 local government agencies, and line ministry staff. The MCCI monitoring team supervised and monitored the data collection. The data was processed, analyzed and sent to the line ministries to assist in their policy formulation.

A 3-day Safe Motherhood Workshop was organized for all stakeholders, including executive committee members and legislators, development center coordinators and their spouses, traditional rulers, the clergy, traditional birth attendants, and other care givers. The aim was to create awareness and sensitize the public about the high rates of maternal mortality and morbidities in the state, as well ways to reduce these rates. The workshop started with a Safe Motherhood Walk at the State capital led by Elechi, accompanied by the Deputy Governor, his wife, and other Ebonyi men and women. The workshop ran simultaneously in the State Capital and 13 local government agenciess of the state. There was also a pre-workshop conference organized by MCCI, with expert representatives from the Federal Ministries of Health and Education, UNICEF, and key stakeholders in the State Ministries of Education and Health. After the workshop, MCCI held three interactive sessions. The third session was attended by the Permanent Secretary of the Federal Ministry of Health.

Elechi sponsored a bill on Mother and Child Initiative and Related Matters to the State House of Assembly. The bill's primary aim was to create a law in the State that would make maternal death reportable, and stipulated a 10 hour duration for referral of pregnant women in labor to a peripheral center. The bill was eventually passed on May 21, 2008, and was assented to by the Governor on June 5, 2008. The law was fully implemented in 2009 after further sensitization of the public, as well as the implementation of the Free Maternal Healthcare Program, and the inauguration of the maternal mortality monitoring committees at the state, local, and ward levels.

A technical committee of the State Ministry of Health and MCCI undertook an evaluation of the state of healthcare facilities to improve the delivery of healthcare services in the State. MCCI also undertook advocacy visits to the 13 local government associations to motivate the public and increase community participation in MCCI thematic areas.

Having garnered the necessary support, the MCCI team, in collaboration with UNFPA, set out to construct and equip a vesico-vaginal fistula center for the southeast zone, to make Ebonyi a center of excellence in vesico-vaginal fistula management. With the center being put in place, the team set out to identify and prepare vesico-vaginal fistula patients for the first-ever vesico-vaginal fistula mass repair campaign in Southern Nigeria. The campaign began on November 17, 2008, followed by the official commissioning of the center by the First Lady of the Federal Republic of Nigeria, Hajiya (Dr.) Turai Yar’Adua, on December 5, 2008. MCCI also created a training on infection prevention and control was organized for the staff of the Fistula Center to equip them with modern concepts of infection prevention and hospital waste management, as well as universal safety precautions that would protect providers and clients from acquiring hospital infections.

The 2009 program commenced with sensitization campaigns and awareness creation at the local government level on the dangers of female genital cutting, teenage pregnancy, the need for pregnant women to attend antenatal clinics and deliver children in the hospital, girl-child education, self-examination for early detection of breast cancer, and the need for annual screening for premalignant lesions of the cervix. Sensitization regarding the maternal mortality law is still ongoing. The sensitization campaign is done primarily through MCCI jingles broadcast on television and over the radio in both English and local languages, and by the MCCE team visiting various communities and local government associations, led by Elechi.

A 2-day stakeholders forum was organized and attended by MCCI, the Federal Ministry of Health, USAID/Acquire Fistula Project, and UNFPA. The forum was organized to explore areas of assistance by the Federal Ministry of Health, and linkages by the South-East Regional Vesico-Vaginal Fistula Center with other partners, to ensure the Program's financial sustainability.

Elechi hosted a one-day Inaugural Forum of Wives of Governors of South-East and Benue States in collaboration with UNICEF, to form an alliance for a shared vision on issues of women and children in the focal areas.

Other areas MCCI is concerned about include Orphans and Vulnerable Children (OVCs), being orphans, street children, and children working at quarry sites or rice mills, or as hawkers. The initiative includes identification of all OVCs in the State, and a way to conduct needs assessments after OVCs are identified.

Through the free mobile clinic program, The Office of the Wife of the Governor is currently engaged in a Statewide free mobile health care exercise, where health care delivery is carried down to the communities in the various LGAs and development centers. During such exercises, deworming procedures are performed on school children.

On June 9th 2010, Elechi gave a presentation titled "Innovations in Fistula Prevention, Treatment, and Reintegration" at the international Women Deliver conference in Washington DC. The theme of the conference was Delivering Solutions for Girls and Women. In her presentation, she described efforts to combat vesico-vaginal fistula in Ebonyi State through a combination of legislation, enlightenment, prevention, and treatment. Sponsorship and support for the conference was provided by a host of governmental and non-governmental organizations, including The World Bank, WHO, UNICEF, USAID, UNFPA, UNAIDS, The European Union, and the Bill and Melinda Gates Foundation. Conference attendees included First Ladies from various countries, representatives of various countries and NGOs, and medical experts in the field of obstetric and fistula care.

== Media ==
Elechi "championed advocacy on the passage of the Mother and child care initiative (MCCI) and related matters law" as reported in March 2010.
