= Ann MacKinnon =

Scottish nurse (1879–1953)

- Born: 4 March 1879; Roag, Isle of Skye, Scotland
- Died: 6 February 1953 (aged 73)
- Body discovered: Hyden, Kentucky
- Other names: Mac, Ann of Appalachia; Annie P. MacKinnon
- Education: School of Nursing, Ayr County Hospital; Queen’s District Nursing and Midwifery, Edinburgh
- Occupations: nurse, midwife, hospital superintendent
- Awards: Croix de Guerre

Ann MacKinnon, also Annie P. MacKinnon, (1879–1953) was a decorated Scottish nurse and midwife. During the World War I she joined the French Flag Nursing Corps and served in France and was awarded the Croix de Guerre for bravery. After the war she remained in France before moving to the United States to work for the Frontier Nursing Service in Kentucky.

== Early life and education ==
MacKinnon was born on the 4 March 1879 in Roag, Isle of Skye to Georgina Urquhart and John MacKinnon. She was educated at Dunvegan Primary School on Skye before moving to the central Scotland to train as a nurse. She spent four years at the School of Nursing in Ayr County Hospital then went on to gain the Queen's District Nursing and Midwifery qualification in Edinburgh. MacKinnon worked as a probationer nurse in Braehead Cottage Hospital, Dumbarton from 1901.

== Career ==
=== Army career in France ===
In 1914, MacKinnon joined the French Flag Nursing Corps and soon after travelled to France as the World War I intensified. She and the other "British Nurses in France" were on the Front Line. In 1918 MacKinnon was awarded the Croix de Guerre for bravery during the Third Battle of the Aisne. This was recorded by The Times newspaper and The British Journal of Nursing:

"Following is the citation of the French army conferring the Croix de Guerre on Miss Annie Mackinnon, a British nurse attached to the French Flag Nursing corps. A nurse who under the difficult circumstances of the withdrawal of the ambulance under enemy fire continued to attend the sick and wounded up to the last minute with remarkable courage and thus demonstrating the three years that she has devoted herself to the French soldiers."

Following the war MacKinnon remained in France working in Marseille and Paris for the Rockefeller Foundation which was part of the relief effort sending food supplies to the European continent. Her main role was to educate a group of French girls about nursing, including tuberculosis and infant welfare.

=== Career in America ===
MacKinnon travelled to the United States on the SS Mormacswan, arriving in New York in 1928. She worked in Beech Fork Nursing Centre and the Hyden Hospital, Kentucky. Mary Breckinridge appointed MacKinnon superintendent of Hyden Hospital in 1929. MacKinnon held this post until 1940, when she travelled to Europe during World War II, returning to the United States and the role in 1948. Hayden Hospital was part of the newly created the Frontier Nursing Service (FNS) which included midwives in their team of public health services and covered a population of close to 10,000 people. The Frontier Nursing Service established six outposts in the Appalachian Mountains in eastern North America and was established by Breckinridge after she travelled to the Highlands and Islands of Scotland to see how healthcare is provided in rural locations. Her goal was to replicate the Highlands and Islands Medical and Nursing Service model in the Appalachian area of the United States. MacKinnon became known as Ann of Appalachia and rode a mule called Tenacity to work.

In 1930, along with Breckinridge, MacKinnon was a founding member of The Kentucky State Association of Midwives. This was the first association of midwives in the United States.

== Death ==
MacKinnon died of a heart attack on 6 February 1953 in Hyden, Kentucky. She is buried at Wendover, Kentucky.

== Honours ==
She was awarded the Croix de Guerre for bravery during World War I.
