= Clifton R. Breckinridge =

American politician (1846–1932)

Clifton Breckinridge
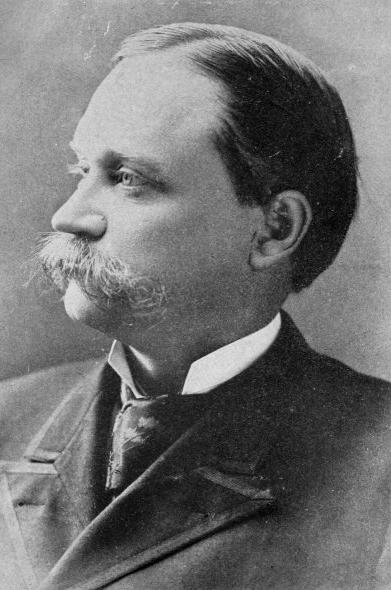

United States Minister to Russia
- In office November 1, 1894 – December 10, 1897
- President: Grover Cleveland; William McKinley
- Preceded by: Andrew White
- Succeeded by: Ethan Hitchcock

Member of the U.S. House of Representatives from Arkansas
- In office March 4, 1883 – September 5, 1890
- Preceded by: District established (AL); James K. Jones (2nd)
- Succeeded by: District eliminated (AL); Vacant (2nd)
- Constituency: At-large district (1883-85); 2nd district (1885-90)
- In office November 4, 1890 – August 14, 1894
- Preceded by: Vacant
- Succeeded by: John S. Little
- Constituency: 2nd district

Personal details
- Born: Clifton Rodes Breckinridge; November 22, 1846 Lexington, Kentucky, U.S.
- Died: December 3, 1932 (aged 86) Wendover, Kentucky, U.S.
- Resting place: Lexington Cemetery
- Party: Democratic
- Spouse: Katherine Carson (m. 1876; died 1921)
- Children: James; Mary
- Parent(s): John C. Breckinridge (father); Mary Burch (mother)
- Relatives: Breckinridge family
- Education: Washington and Lee University

Military service
- Allegiance: Confederate States
- Branch/service: Confederate States Army; Confederate States Navy
- Rank: Midshipman
- Battles/wars: American Civil War

Clifton Rodes Breckinridge (November 22, 1846 – December 3, 1932) was an American politician who served as a Democratic Party alderman, U.S. representative, diplomat, and businessman. He also served in both the Confederate States Army and Confederate States Navy in the American Civil War. He was a member of the prominent Breckinridge family, the son of Vice President of the United States and Confederate general John C. Breckinridge and the great-grandson of U.S. Senator and Attorney General of the United States John Breckinridge.

== Early life ==
Born near Lexington, Kentucky, the son of John Cabell and Mary Cyrene Burch Breckinridge, Breckinridge attended rural schools in his hometown as a child. The Breckinridge family had by that time already established itself as a political dynasty. Clifton's grandfather, John Breckinridge, was President Thomas Jefferson’s attorney general, while Clifton's father would over the years hold several high-ranking government positions, including vice president of the United States.

=== Civil War ===
At the outbreak of the Civil War, 15-year old Clifton entered the Confederate Army with his father and was later a midshipman in the Confederate Navy.

=== Education and early business career ===
After the war, he attended Washington College in Lexington, Virginia, for three years where the school's president, Confederate General Robert E. Lee, encouraged his desire for a career of public service. Afterwards, he joined his older brother in a cotton plantation near Pine Bluff, Arkansas, and engaged in cotton planting and in the commission business for thirteen years. In 1876, Breckinridge married Katherine Carson, the daughter of a well-to-do Mississippi family, with whom he had four children.

== Politics ==
Breckinridge started his political career when he was elected an alderman in the Pine Bluff City Council.

=== Congress ===
He was later elected a Democrat to the United States House of Representatives in 1882, taking seat in 1883. John G. Carlisle, the new Speaker of the House and friend of the Breckinridges, saw to it that the new congressman got a place on the Committee on Ways and Means. He was reelected in 1884 and 1886.

=== Clayton Affair ===
Breckinridge's political career came into great danger after the election of 1888. Arkansas Democrats were found guilty of voting fraud in the election for Arkansas's 2nd congressional district after it was discovered that in Conway County, Arkansas, four masked and armed white men stormed into a predominantly black voting precinct and, at gunpoint, stole the ballot box that contained a large majority of votes for his Republican opponent, John M. Clayton, the brother of former Arkansas Governor and Senator Powell Clayton. Under these circumstances, Clayton contested the election and went to Plumerville, Arkansas, to start an investigation on the matter. However, on the evening of January 29, 1889, an unknown assailant shot through the window to the room he was staying in at a local boardinghouse and killed him instantly. After a congressional investigation, Clayton was declared the winner, thus unseating Breckinridge; however, owing to Clayton's death, the seat was declared vacant. Breckinridge was not found guilty in any wrongdoing in the rigged election or in Clayton's assassination and was elected to fill the vacant seat in 1890.

=== Tenure in Congress ===
Breckinridge was reelected to the House of Representatives again in 1890 and 1892. He was one of the authors of legislation to repeal the Sherman Silver Purchase Act and adopted the Wilson–Gorman Tariff Act. He regained trust after the so-called "Clayton Affair" and was greatly respected as a congressman. A featured article in Harper's Weekly described him as "one of the very first men in the House of Representatives." During the Panic of 1893-1894, Breckinridge staunchly supported President Grover Cleveland's defense of the gold standard. Arkansas farmers, most of whom supported free silver, refused to support the incumbent for reelection and Breckinridge lost the Democratic primary to John S. Little who went on to win the election.

== Diplomat ==
=== Minister to Russia ===
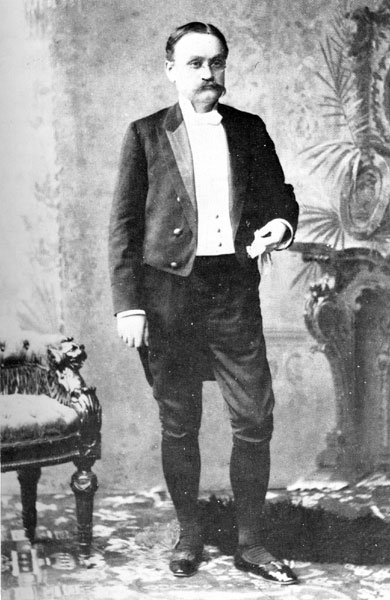
U.S. Minister Clifton R. Breckinridge at the coronation of Nicholas II of Russia in 1896 wearing court knee breeches in which he was uncomfortable.

Breckinridge resigned from the House of Representatives in 1894 before his final term's expiration to accept President Cleveland's nomination as Minister to Russia where he served until 1897. As Minister, he proved capable of sending reports on Russian aims back to Washington, D.C. His warnings about the end of friendly relations between Russia and China due to Russia's expansion into China did not affect any change in the United States' foreign policy due to its then-prevailing isolationism. Because of this, Breckinridge largely dealt with routine problems of trade and immigration. He was less successful in handling the ceremonial and social aspects of diplomacy in Saint Petersburg as the expense of entertaining amidst the splendor of the aristocratic Russian capital was beyond his means. This was particularly true during the rich festivities that marked the coronation of Tsar Nicholas II and Empress Alexandra Fyodorovna in 1896. To his chagrin, at the coronation, Breckinridge had to wear ceremonial knee breeches required by protocol. Breckinridge feared his former constituents in Arkansas would never understand his elaborate attire.

=== Dawes Commission ===
After William McKinley, a former colleague of his from the House Ways and Means Committee, took office as President in 1897, McKinley replaced Breckinridge with Republican Ethan Allen Hitchcock and he returned to Pine Bluff, Arkansas. However, in 1900, McKinley appointed him to a position on the Dawes Commission to the Five Civilized Tribes in Indian Territory. Given the responsibility of distributing individual allotments of tribal land to the Cherokee, Breckinridge and other commissioners were charged with fraudulently acquiring Indian lands in 1903. An investigation handled by the Department of Justice cleared Breckinridge of illegal actions and he left the commission in 1905.

== Later life and death ==
After resigning from the Dawes Commission, Breckinridge founded the Arkansas Valley Trust Company in Fort Smith, Arkansas, which he served as president of until 1914. He was a delegate to the Arkansas Constitutional Convention from 1917 to 1918 where he convinced fellow delegates to approve a unicameral legislature, however the provision later rescinded. He was widowed in 1921 and lived in Fort Smith until 1925 when he moved to Hyden, Kentucky to live with his daughter, Mary Breckinridge, founder of the Frontier Nursing Service. At first they lived in the first Midwife Clinic with the nurses while the big log cabin was being built in Wendover. Clifton looked after the horses for the first frontier nurses.

=== Death and burial ===
He died in Wendover on December 3, 1932, at age eighty-six.

He was interred at Lexington Cemetery among several members of his family including his wife and children. His Fort Smith house is listed on the National Register of Historic Places.

== See also ==
- Breckinridge family in the American Civil War
- Kentucky in the American Civil War

== Bibliography ==
- Barnes, Kenneth C. "Who Killed John M. Clayton? Political Violence in Conway County, Arkansas, in the 1880s." Arkansas Historical Quarterly 52 (Winter 1993): 371–404.
- Bolin, James Duane. "Clifton Rodes Breckinridge: The Little Arkansas Giant." Arkansas Historical Quarterly 53 (Winter 1994): 407–427.
- Breckinridge, Clifton Rodes. "Improvement of the Mississippi River." Washington: Government Printing Office, 1884.
- Breckinridge, Clifton Rodes. "Speech of Hon. Clifton R. Breckinridge, of Arkansas, in the House of Representatives, March 22, 1884." Washington: Government Printing Office, 1884.
- Ledbetter, Calvin R. "The Constitutional Convention of 1917–1918." Arkansas Historical Quarterly 34 (Spring 1975): 3–40.
- Willis, James F. "An Arkansan in St. Petersburg: Clifton Rodes Breckinridge, Minister to Russia, 1894–1897." Arkansas Historical Quarterly 38 (Spring 1979): 3–31.

U.S. House of Representatives
Constituency reestablished	Member of the U.S. House of Representatives from Arkansas's at-large congressional district 1883–1885	Constituency abolished
Preceded by James Kimbrough Jones	Member of the U.S. House of Representatives from Arkansas's 2nd congressional district Unseated; 1885–1890	Succeeded by John Clayton; Elect
Preceded by John Clayton; Elect	Member of the U.S. House of Representatives from Arkansas's 2nd congressional district 1890–1894	Succeeded by John Little
Diplomatic posts
Preceded by Andrew White	United States Minister to Russia; 1894–1897	Succeeded by Ethan Hitchcock
