= Susan Stone =

Susan Stone may refer to:

- Susan Stone (tennis)
- Susan Stone (athlete)
- Susan Stone (nurse)
