= B.F. Goodrich =

B.F. Goodrich may refer to:

- Benjamin Goodrich, a physician and industrialist who founded what became the B.F. Goodrich Company, a tire and rubber manufacturer
- Goodrich Corporation, an aerospace manufacturer and defense company that is descended from the former B.F. Goodrich Company
- BFGoodrich, a brand of tires produced and sold by Michelin
