= Marvin Breckinridge Patterson =

American photographer and philanthropist

Mary Marvin Breckinridge Patterson
- Born: October 2, 1905; New York City, New York
- Died: December 11, 2002 (aged 97); Washington, DC
- Occupations: Photojournalist; Cinematographer; Philanthropist; Director; Journalist
- Spouse: Jefferson Patterson
- Parent(s): John C. Breckinridge & Isabella Goodrich

Mary Marvin Breckinridge Patterson (October 2, 1905 – December 11, 2002), was an American photojournalist, cinematographer, and philanthropist. She used her middle name, Marvin, both professionally and personally to distinguish herself from her cousin Mary Breckinridge (founder of the Frontier Nursing Service) and to avoid the prejudice against women that was prevalent at the time.

== Family and marriage ==
Mary Marvin Breckinridge was born on October 2, 1905, in New York City, to John C. Breckinridge, of the prominent Kentucky Breckinridge family, and Isabella Goodrich Breckinridge, daughter of B. F. Goodrich. Her great-grandfather, John C. Breckinridge, was Vice President of the United States under James Buchanan, a Confederate general and Confederate Secretary of War. Her godmother and cousin was Isabella Selmes Greenway, Arizona's first Congresswoman.

While broadcasting for the CBS World News Roundup in Berlin, Marvin met Jefferson Patterson. They married on June 20, 1940.

== Education ==
When she was young, Marvin's family moved around a fair amount, and she attended "twelve schools before graduating from Milton Academy in Milton, Massachusetts" before eventually enrolling at Vassar College in 1923.

While a student at Vassar College, she helped found the National Student Federation of America, which was how she made an acquaintance with Edward R. Murrow. While a member of the National Student Federation, she attended the 1925 International Conference of Students in Copenhagen. Marvin graduated from Vassar College in 1927.

In an alumnae questionnaire from Vassar in 1939, Marvin wrote about her experience in college by denoting that, “I went to Vassar because my family wanted me to and had brought me up in that expectation all my life.” She also mentioned that “For the first time I heard other opinions than those expressed by my parents. I also got the ability to study for myself any subject in which I was interested, and learned how to go about such a study.” Furthermore, while at Vassar, Mary Marvin majored in French, minored in history and even served as president of North (now known as Jewett House) when she was a junior.

After her graduation from Vassar, she was a postgraduate student at the Clarence White School of Photography, University of Berlin, the Catholic University of Lima, and the American University of Cairo.

== Career ==
Mary began taking stills at the age of 9 and by the age of 15 was able to develop her own photographs. In 1926, Mary received her first camera for Christmas while still attending Vassar College.

The Forgotten Frontier documentary, created by Mary Marvin Breckinridge, cousin to the founder of the Frontier Nursing Service, Mary Carson Breckinridge.

=== Cinematography ===
Marvin’s interest in cinematography came about after her cousin suggested that she should study cinematography professionally. After her graduation from school, Marvin began working for her cousin, Mary, in the Frontier Nursing Service. During this time, she made the acclaimed black and white silent film The Forgotten Frontier (1930). The film tells the story of the Frontier Nursing Service, which is a nurse and midwifery health service that was founded by her cousin in the Appalachian Mountains of Kentucky. The Forgotten Frontier is one of Marvin's most notable works, as it was named to the National Film Registry in 1996.

Following The Forgotten Frontier, Marvin then produced and directed a piece called She Goes to Vassar, which was meant to showcase what goes on in college, especially for the women, and to also keep alumnae informed after they had graduated. It offered a new perspective and look into women students at all women's universities. This film debuted at the Potomac School on December 19, 1931.

She also became involved in an amateur film group, called the Metropolitan Movie Club of New York.

=== Photojournalism ===
Marvin traveled extensively and published photographs from her world travels in magazines such as Vogue, National Geographic, Look, Life, Town & Country, and Harper's Bazaar, especially a 1932 Africa trip from Cape Town to Cairo.

=== Broadcasting ===
During World War II, Marvin was hired by Edward R. Murrow as the first female news broadcaster to report from Europe for the CBS Radio Network. She reported 50 times, from seven European countries, including reports from Berlin, Germany. She became the first woman among the original generation of the CBS reporting staff known as Murrow's Boys. She also was the first woman to head a CBS office when she was put in charge of the network's operations in Amsterdam.

During her time at CBS, Marvin met Edward R. Murrow who accompanied her on many of her assignments. Edward Murrow was also the same individual who encouraged her to speak in a deep voice while broadcasting and hired her as the first female news broadcaster for the CBS World News Roundup which was in Europe. She was one of only four photographers to be within England for the first months of the war. During this time, she traveled to London which is where she photographed the evacuation of English children. Marvin was also in Switzerland in 1939 when the Nazis invaded Poland during World War II. Eventually, around fifty reports were made from seven countries in which Marvin was collaborating and producing.

As a woman, Marvin was generally assigned to apolitical stories relating to lifestyle and culture. However, she still found ways to venture into more serious issues. One of her most famous broadcasts involved describing the official Nazi newspaper Voelkische Beobachter: "The motto of this important official paper is Freedom and Bread. There is still bread." The subtle implication that Germany was no longer free went over the heads of her German censors, and the comment was permitted to be broadcast.

Her career ended when she married U.S. diplomat Jefferson Patterson in June 1940. Patterson was the son of Frank Jefferson Patterson, a founder of the National Cash Register Company. She willingly resigned from CBS, hoping to resume her original career in photojournalism, but was barred from publication by the United States State Department, who claimed that her activities would compromise her husband's work in Berlin. After marriage she served with her husband who had foreign service assignments in Berlin, Belgium, Egypt, the U.N. Special Committee on the Balkans, Greece, and in Uruguay, where he served as United States ambassador.

== Philanthropy ==
After her husband’s death in 1977, Mrs. Patterson began to give away many of her assets. MARPAT, a foundation she created, gave grants to "cultural, environmental, historical, and social service organizations". She served on the boards of several institutions including the Frontier Nursing Service, the Textile Museum, National Symphony Orchestra, Meridian House International, International Student House, the Women’s Committees of the Smithsonian Institution, the Corcoran Gallery of Art, and the International Committee of the Folger Shakespeare Library.

She was a major financial supporter and donated art and her photographs to these organizations and to the Library of Congress, the American News Women’s Club, the Dayton Art Institute, the English-Speaking Union, the Kennedy Center, St. Albans School, the Society of Woman Geographers, the U.S. Capitol Historical Society, the University of Kentucky, Vassar College, WETA-TV, several pro-choice organizations, and many other organizations.

In 1985 she created The MARPAT Foundation, which continues to make grants to museums, galleries, environmental and historical organizations, and to cultural and social service groups within the greater Washington Metropolitan area. Marvin Patterson was also benefactor to IONA Senior Services. which helped provide services for the elderly in Washington.

In 1974 she donated her family estate in York, Maine (now listed on the National Register of Historic Places), to Bowdoin College for use as the Breckinridge Public Affairs Center. In 1983 she donated her and her husband's 550-acre (2.2 km^{2}) farm in Maryland, thus creating the Patterson's Archeological District, which includes extensive Native American and American colonial sites.

== Honors and accomplishments ==
In 1929, she became the first female pilot licensed in Maine.

The Forgotten Frontier is one of Mary's most notable works, as it was named to the National Film Registry in 1996. Her diaries which contained plan and ideas for The Forgotten Frontier were archived in the Library of Congress in the fall of 1929.

She received the Calvert Prize for Conservation in 1984.

In 1987, a study room was dedicated to Mary Breckinridge in the Department of Special Collections at the University of Kentucky. The room now stands as the Breckinridge Research Room in the Special Collections Research Center in the Margaret I. King Library

She received honorary doctorates from Bowdoin College and Georgetown University.

She served on boards and committees for the following organizations: The Frontier Nursing Service, the Textile Museum, the National Symphony Orchestra, and the Smithsonian Institution.

== Legacy ==
On December 11, 2002, at the age of ninety-seven, Mary Marvin Breckinridge Patterson died. She died at her Washington home from pneumonia while also having cerebral vascular disease.

Eight years after she died the Library of Congress recognized her wartime photojournalism and broadcasts along with seven other female journalists and photographers which included: Clare Booth Luce, Janet Flanner, Dorothea Lange and May Craig. The exhibit that showcased these women’s works was named Women Come to the Front: Journalists, Photographers and Broadcasters During World War II. Many of Marvin's photographs taken while she was in Kentucky in 1937 are considered “classics” and have been shown in many exhibitions.
