= Gertrude Sawyer =

American architect

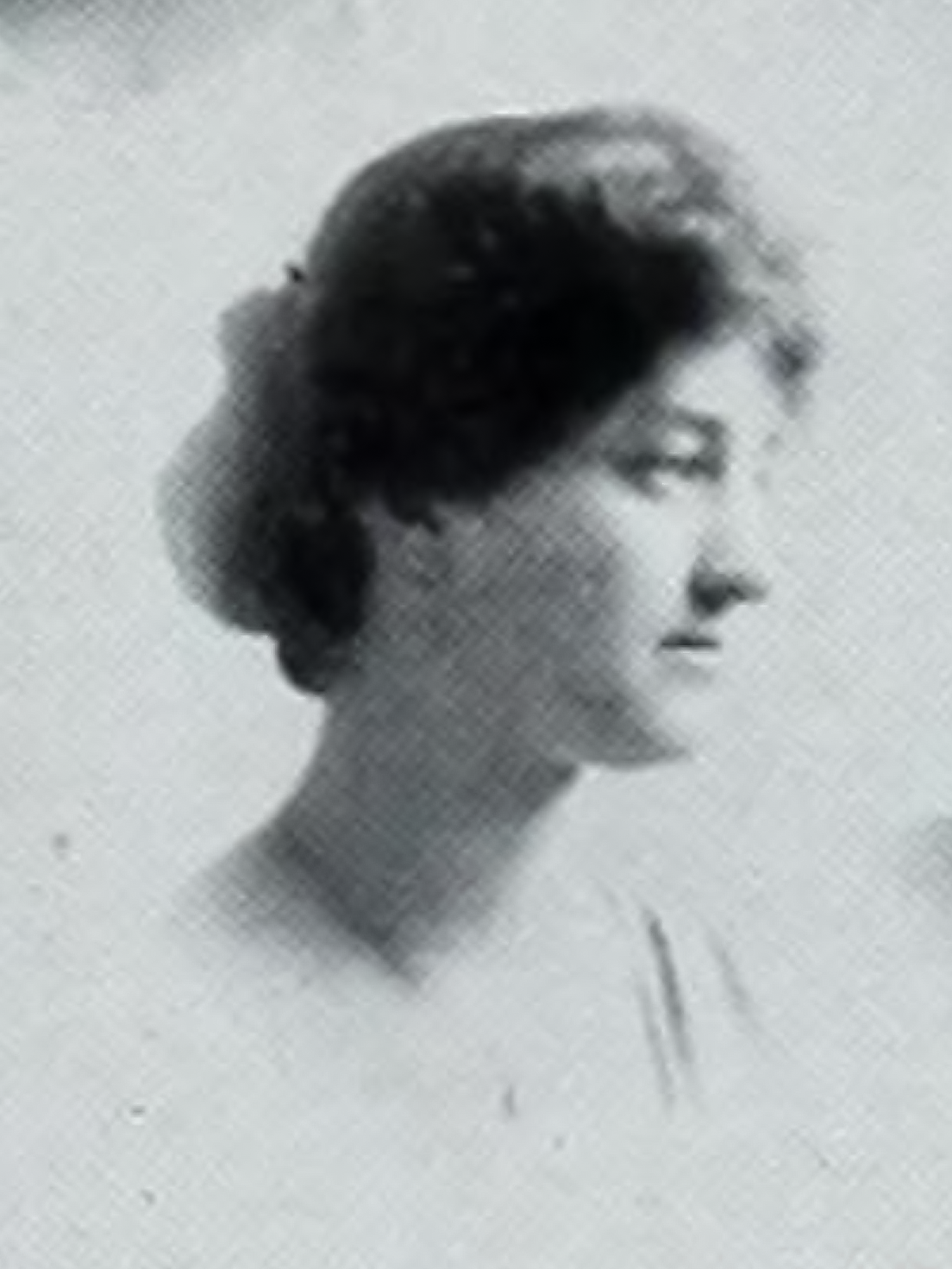
- Born: April 2, 1895; Tuscola, Illinois
- Died: February 11, 1996 (aged 100); Pomona, California
- Occupation: Architect
- Education: University of Illinois, B.S. (1918); Cambridge School of Domestic and Landscape Architecture for Women, M.Arch. (1922)

Gertrude Sawyer AIA (April 2, 1895 – February 11, 1996) was one of the earliest American women architects to practice in Maryland and the Washington, D.C., area.

== Early life and education ==
Sawyer was born April 2, 1895, in Tuscola, Illinois. She knew she wanted to be an architect from an early age. Sawyer graduated high school in Norborne, Missouri in 1913 and graduated from Tudor Hall School in Indianapolis, Indiana in 1914. She received a Bachelor of Science in landscape architecture from the University of Illinois in 1918 and went on to become one of the first students at the Cambridge School of Domestic and Landscape Architecture for Women, where she met landscape architect Rose Greely. She graduated from the Cambridge School in 1922 receiving a Master of Architecture degree.

== Architectural career ==
After graduating in 1922, Sawyer worked in the architectural firm of Edward Buehler Delk in Kansas City, Missouri, for a few months and designed her first house. In 1923, she moved to Washington, D.C., where she worked for architect Horace Peaslee (for whom Greely also worked around the same time).

In 1925, Sawyer traveled around Europe. On her return, in 1926, she became registered to practice architecture in the District of Columbia. In subsequent decades, she would become licensed in the states of Maryland, Pennsylvania, Ohio, and Florida.

Sawyer taught architecture at Vassar College in the summers of 1930 and 1931. She opened her own architectural practice in Georgetown, Washington, D.C., in 1934, specializing in historic restoration and buildings in the Colonial Revival style, although she also built at least one building in the Streamline Moderne style. She became especially admired for her eye for detail.

Starting in 1932, Sawyer designed over two dozen residential and farm buildings for career diplomat Jefferson Patterson on his estate in St. Leonard, Maryland. Her designs include a main house in Colonial Revival style with such elements as a formal pillared entry, side porch, and classical moldings in the interior. She enlisted Rose Greely and Cary Millholland Parker to design the landscaping. The Patterson estate was later given to the state by Patterson's widow and turned into the 560-acre Jefferson Patterson Park & Museum.

During World War II, from 1943 to 1945, Sawyer served in the navy's Civil Engineer Corps (the Seabees), with the rank of lieutenant commander. Among her wartime tasks was designing housing from some 14,000 people. After the war, she was the only woman to be designated a reserve Seabee officer.

Sawyer became a member of the American Institute of Architects in 1939.

Sawyer retired in 1969. She moved to California, where she died on February 11, 1996, two months short of her 101st birthday.

== Partial list of buildings ==
- Country Club Plaza, Kansas City (ca. 1922?)
- Sarah Louisa Rittenhouse Memorial in Montrose Park (ca. 1923–24)
- Jefferson Patterson's Point Farm, St. Leonard, Maryland (from 1932 on)
- 2001 Massachusetts Ave NW, Embassy Row, Washington, D.C.: office/apartment building, now Kossuth House (1935)
- Tudor Hall, Leonardtown, Maryland (restoration, 1950)
- Gertrude Sawyer house, Washington, D.C. (ca. 1920–1950)
- 1640 Wisconsin Ave NW, Washington, D.C. (1969)
