= Jefferson Patterson Park & Museum =

Archive organization in Leonardtown, Maryland, U.S.

Jefferson Patterson Park & Museum (JPPM) is a 560-acre state park and museum located along the Patuxent River in St. Leonard, Calvert County, Maryland. The property of JPPM was given to the state of Maryland by Mary Marvin Patterson in 1983 in honor of her husband Jefferson Patterson, a U.S. diplomat. Many of its buildings were designed by Gertrude Sawyer starting in the 1930s, and some landscaping was done by Rose Greely and Cary Millholland Parker.

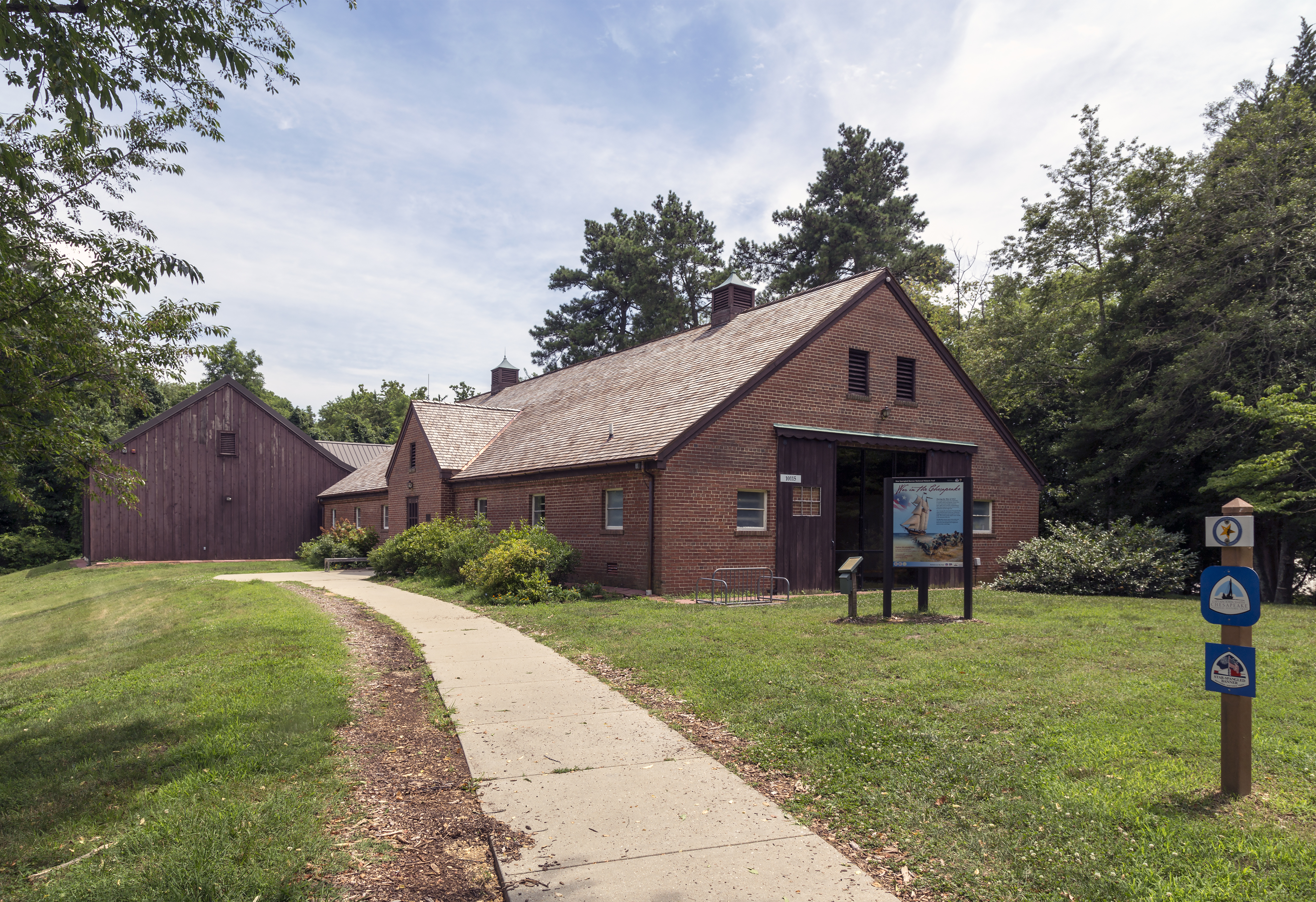
The park visitor center, a former barn

The property has more than 70 identified archaeological sites, with current excavation and research being done. The land features 9,000 years of documented human occupation.

The park has hiking and biking trails, a canoe and kayak launch, a visitor center with exhibits and a gift shop, an exhibit barn, a pavilion for event rental, a recreated Woodland Indian village, and a historic house. JPPM has several annual events as well as educational programs and summer camps. Admission is free.

The visitor center, located in a former cattle barn, features displays about the Pattersons, and about the science of archaeology and the work being done on the property. The Exhibit Barn features a War of 1812 exhibit and displays of antique farm equipment.

The Woodland Village was created in 2007 for the commemoration of the 400th anniversary of John Smith’s exploration of the Chesapeake Bay and its tributaries. It provides a glimpse into life as it might have been when John Smith visited the people who lived along the Patuxent River. The village features four wigwams, a central fire pit, and a working garden outside the palisade where a variety of plants represent the crops Native people were growing.

== Archaeology ==
JPPM is also the home of the Maryland Archaeological Conservation Laboratory (MAC Lab), which houses almost 10 million artifacts. The MAC Lab serves as a clearinghouse for archaeological collections recovered from land-based and underwater projects conducted by State and Federal agencies throughout Maryland. All of these collections are available for research, education, and exhibit purposes to students, scholars, museum curators, and educators. Patterson's Archeological District is included in the park's lands.
