= National Student Federation =

National Student Federation may refer to:

- National Student Federation, a front organization created by the Apartheid government in South Africa
- National Students Federation, leftist student organization in Pakistan
- National Student Federation of America, a federation of college student governments in the US from the 1920s to the 1940s
