= Wendover (disambiguation) =

Wendover is a town in Buckinghamshire, England.

Wendover may also refer to:

== Places ==
=== Canada ===
- Wendover, Ontario
- Saint-Cyrille-de-Wendover, Quebec

=== United States ===
- Wendover, Utah
- West Wendover, Nevada

== People ==
- Roger of Wendover (died 1236), English chronicler
- John Wendover, 14th-century Archdeacon of Lewes
- Peter H. Wendover (1768–1834), United States Representative from New York
- Stephen H. Wendover (1831–1889), New York State senator

== Transportation ==
- Wendover Air Force Base, a former air base in Utah
- Wendover Airport, Utah
- Wendover Cut-off, a highway in Utah
- Wendover railway station, England

== Other ==
- Wendover (Hyden, Kentucky), a log building and U.S. national historic landmark
- Wendover (UK Parliament constituency)
- Wendover Avenue (Greensboro) in Greensboro, North Carolina
- Wendover Productions, an educational YouTube channel
