= Mary Carson Breckinridge =

Founder of the American FNS (1881–1965)

- Born: February 17, 1881; Memphis, Tennessee, U.S.
- Died: May 16, 1965 (aged 84); Hyden, Kentucky, U.S.
- Known for: Founding the Frontier Nursing Service
- Spouses: Henry Ruffner Morrison (m. 1904; died 1906) Richard Ryan Thompson (m. 1912; div. 1920)
- Children: 2
- Medical career
- Profession: Nurse midwife

Mary Carson Breckinridge (February 17, 1881 – May 16, 1965) was an American nurse midwife and the founder of the Frontier Nursing Service (FNS), which provided comprehensive family medical care to the mountain people of rural Kentucky. FNS served remote and impoverished areas off the road and rail system but accessible by horseback. She modeled her services on European practices and sought to professionalize American nurse-midwives to practice autonomously in homes and decentralized clinics. Although Breckinridge's work demonstrated efficacy by dramatically reducing infant and maternal mortality in Appalachia, at a comparatively low cost, her model of nurse-midwifery never took root in the United States.

== Early childhood and family ==
Mary Breckinridge was born February 17, 1881, in Memphis, Tennessee, the second of four children, into the wealthy southern family of Katherine Carson and Clifton Rhodes Breckinridge. As the granddaughter of Vice President John C. Breckinridge, who served under President James Buchanan, and the daughter of an Arkansas congressman and U.S. Minister to Russia, Mary Breckinridge grew up in many places that included estates in Mississippi, Kentucky, and New York; seats of government in Washington, D.C., and Saint Petersburg, Russia; and schools in Lausanne, Switzerland, and Stamford, Connecticut. These political and family connections that provided international travel experiences, public speaking practice, and access to influential and wealthy benefactors willing to support philanthropic causes would enable her to raise private funds that would serve the impoverished residents of Leslie County, Kentucky.

Although Breckinridge was born into a prominent family with means, she was dissatisfied that her older brother was afforded a higher quality education in private schools while she and her sister were taught at home by governesses or her own mother. Though she did not experience the quality of education of her older brother, she was educated by private tutors in Washington, D.C., Switzerland and in St. Petersburg, Russia.

Several childhood connections and experiences made a lasting impression that helped prepare Breckinridge for a career committed to family-centered public health, and to a midwifery model of continuous care that would provide maternal and child nutrition, immunizations, prenatal care, birth support, and post-natal check ups.

In 1894, Breckinridge and her family moved to Russia when President Grover Cleveland appointed her father to serve as the U.S. minister to that country. They returned to the United States in 1897. Her autobiography emphasizes the story of her younger brother's birth at the American Legation in St. Petersburg, Russia as her first encounter with a trained midwife that would prove to be formative in her vision of the Frontier Nursing Service. She was 14 at the time. Her mother was attended by two physicians, a family physician and an obstetrician, as well a Russian nurse-midwife, Madame Kouchnova, who took the lead while the doctors stood by. Her mother and the young Russian Empress Alexandra of Russia, mother of the Grand Duchess Olga, chose to breastfeed their infants, at a time when women of rank customarily relied on wet-nurses. Breckinridge, born in Memphis, Tennessee, during the Reconstruction era, was fed by a wet nurse and supplemented by goat milk. Her wet nurse was a woman of color with a child of her own. Her mother had suffered from childbed fever after the birth, so she did not breastfeed her daughter. Up to the age of 13, she lived in Washington, D.C., during the winter and spent most summer months at Hazelwood, a country house in New York, with her great-aunt, Mrs. James Lees. "Grandmother Lees," as she was called by all the cousins, was born in Kentucky and spent much of her fortune educating southern children, with special care for Kentucky children. Breckinridge recalled her grandmother reading letters from the children out loud. Hence, it seemed fitting to her to later invest her inheritance from Grandmother Lees in the Frontier Nursing Service. She also visited the Oasis Plantation in the Mississippi Delta, home of her maternal uncles. It is there she learned at a young age to ride horseback, a necessary skill and signature mode of travel among the nurse-midwives of the Frontier Nursing Service.

== Marriage and children ==
Breckinridge entered a world where the primary roles of women were wife and mother, yet her legacy as the founder of the Frontier Nursing Service rises to the level of prominence among males in the Breckinridge family, as noted in several obituaries that discussed her many contributions to the public health of rural Kentuckians. Breckinridge's mother disapproved of her cousin Sophonisba Breckinridge's going to Wellesley College and starting a career because it meant that she would not likely return home to live. She helped to ensure that her daughter followed a more traditional path.

In 1904 at the age of 23, Breckinridge married Henry Ruffner Morrison, a lawyer from Hot Springs, Arkansas. He died in 1906 due to complications from appendicitis. There were no children from her first marriage.

In 1912 she married Richard Ryan Thompson, a Kentucky native who was serving as the president of Crescent College and Conservatory in Eureka Springs, Arkansas. Prior to having children, Breckinridge taught French and hygiene classes at the Conservatory, teaching experiences that would position her to serve in France after the war.

The couple had two children. Their daughter Polly was born prematurely in 1916 and lived only a few hours. Their son, Clifton Breckinridge ("Breckie") Thompson, born in 1914, died just two years after the death of their daughter. Having experienced the death of one husband and two children, Breckinridge committed herself to creating conditions conducive to the health and well-being of children and families.

Breckinridge left her unhappy marriage to her second husband in 1918 and resumed the use of her maiden name once the divorce became final in 1920.

== Formal and practical education ==
Breckinridge was governess- and tutor-educated through her primary years and sent to the boarding school of Rosemont-Dezaley at Lausanne (1896–97) for secondary education with the goal that she would learn to speak and write with social grace upon marriage. French was the language of the school, and the curriculum focused on reading and writing about history and literature. The French immersion experience and the years in the Swiss Alps would prepare Breckinridge to administer a nursing program in France after World War I and instill a love of mountains that included the Scottish Highlands, the Ozarks, and the Appalachian Range. She finished her secondary education at Miss Low's School in Stamford, CT, where she had to make social adjustments to fit in with American students and where she struggled with the Latin and mathematics for which she had no prior preparation. The frequent moving and changing of educational settings and expectations would dispose her to work that required significant adaptations. Following the death of her first husband, Breckinridge pursued higher education at St. Luke's Hospital of Nursing in New York for three years and graduated in 1910, becoming a registered nurse, before rejoining her family in Ft. Smith, Arkansas. After the deaths of her two children and the dissolution of her second marriage, she worked in the slums of Washington, D.C., supervising nurses during the 1918 influenza epidemic. Before departing for Europe, Breckinridge completed a short, intensive course in baby welfare work at the Boston Instructive District Nursing Association, working in the slums and tenements of Boston.

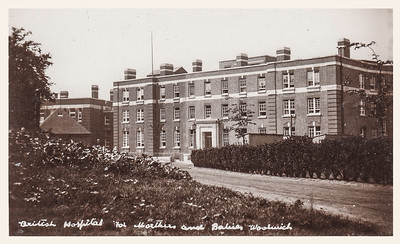
Old postcard of British Hospital for Mothers and Babies

Three years with the American Committee for Devastated France helped Breckinridge imagine a plan for public health in rural Kentucky with nurse-midwives situated at the center of the system. To design the details of her plan, she took several deliberate educational and administrative steps:

- She selected a series of advanced courses in public health nursing at Teachers College, Columbia University to fill in deficits (e.g. statistics, child psychology, mental hygiene, biology).
- She spent the summer of 1923 riding horseback over 650 miles through the hills of Kentucky to conduct a summer survey of midwives in the region, who averaged 60 years of age. Though she discovered some competence, she also found filth and a medieval level of care.
- Since no midwifery course was then offered in the United States, Breckinridge returned to England in the fall of 1923 to receive the training she needed at the British Hospital for Mothers and Babies. After completing a four-month intensive course in midwifery, she was certified by the Central Midwives Board.
- After earning her midwifery certificate, Breckinridge travelled to the Hebrides, Scotland, in 1924 to look at models of health service in remote rural areas. She scheduled a comprehensive tour of Scotland's public health system. The Highlands and Islands Medical and Nursing Service would become the model on which she built the Frontier Nursing Service. The decentralized and coordinated system was funded by a combination of private enterprise and public grants. Nurses were trained in public health, district nursing, and midwifery. Breckinridge paid careful attention to the quality of local committees and the nurses' living conditions.
- Finally, she returned to London to the Post Certificate School as a post graduate student of midwifery to supplement her four-month certificate course. The Queen's Institute of District Nursing had a maternal death rate below 2%.

Breckinridge would be able to return to Kentucky with the formal education, practical experience, and administrative connections to create the Frontier Nursing Service.

== European models for a visiting nurse service ==
While awaiting deployment to Northern France at the end of World War I, Breckinridge accepted a contract with the Children's Bureau (Child Welfare Department of the Council of National Defense). She reported on child welfare in several states and delivered speeches to advocate for children.

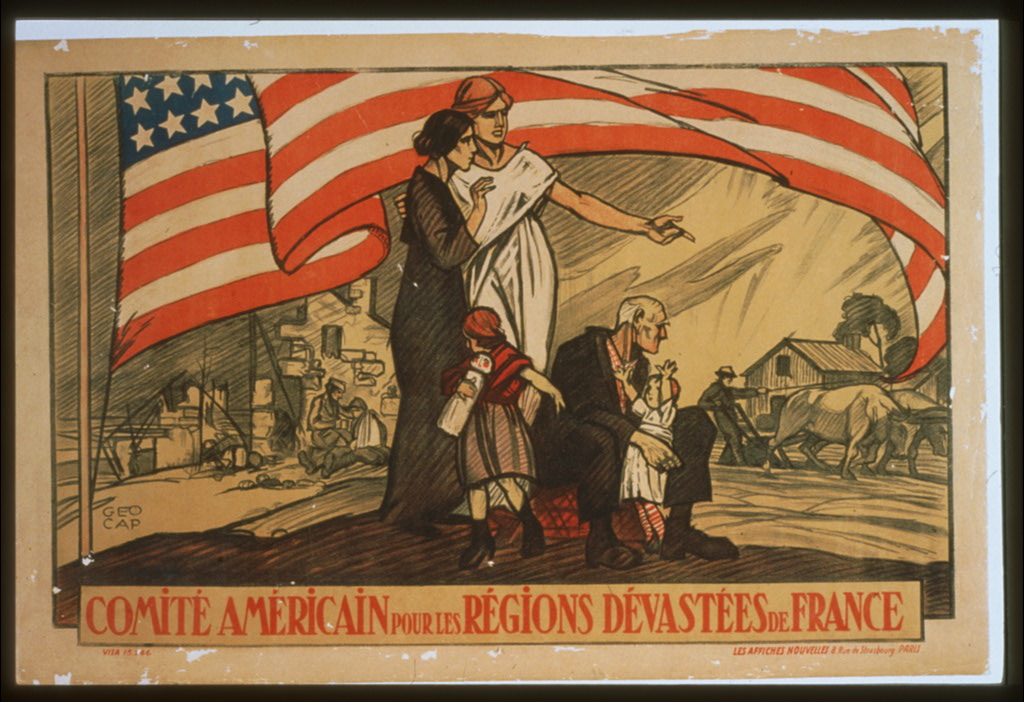
Lithograph for the American Committee for the Devastated Regions of France

Following the Armistice, Breckinridge volunteered for the American Committee for Devastated France, where her group provided direct relief in restoring supply chains of food, seed, and medicine. She began to focus on children under 6 and pregnant and nursing mothers, caring for patients with pneumonia, impetigo, eczema, scarlet fever, and diphtheria. She attended to malnourished children with developmental delays, families who had been under frequent fire during the war, and evacuated families in the process of being reunited. Breckinridge wrote many letters home to her mother throughout her stay. In one she mentioned how much families would benefit from goat's milk. Her mother helped to organize donors and establish a goat fund. Breckinridge wrote to thank all donors, share a story of the child they had helped, and call for additional funds for beet roots to feed the goats. The goat-giver circle widened and continued to send funds.

In addition to direct relief, the American Committee for Devastated France began to rebuild a public health system in the years following the war. Breckinridge played a central role as an administrator and began her work by studying the system in place before the war as a method for imagining what system would work best for the people. There had been a system with milk stations and physicians who saw patients at a town hall. Building on that, Breckinridge developed the Child Hygiene and Visiting Nurse Service that would send nurse-midwives around the countryside and moved toward becoming a fully generalized service, caring for all ages. The American Committee for Devastated France extended their work from the Aisne to the Reims after the British unit departed. During this time, Breckinridge envisioned the service as a demonstration project, and so she kept detailed records and data to form the basis of her organizational plans. She recognized that the organizational structure of decentralized outposts in France could be mimicked in other rural areas. She would implement these ideas in her later work with the Frontier Nursing Service.

To fully realize a visiting nurse service, Breckinridge knew there would be a need for trained nurse-midwives like those from England. On leave from France, she toured facilities in London alongside professional nurse-midwives. She observed that the United States had trained nurses but neglected midwifery; that France trained midwives but overlooked nurse training; and that England trained nurse-midwives who would best serve the needs of rural communities in France and America. Breckinridge was tasked before her departure from France to devise a plan to establish a nursing school so that the work of the visiting nurse service could carry on. Although her plan to establish a French teaching hospital for nurses was never realized, she gained knowledge from the process that would help her efforts to create the Frontier Nursing Service once she returned to the United States. She returned home in the fall of 1921, able to visit with her mother, who died a month later on November 2, 1921.

== Midwifery model of public health ==
While in Europe, Breckinridge had met French, English, and Scottish nurse midwives and realized that people with similar training could meet the health care needs of rural America's mothers and babies. Ultimately, she found her model for FNS in the Scottish Highlands' decentralized system. Based on her survey of folk practices among the Kentucky "granny-midwives" of Leslie County, Kentucky, Breckinridge understood the systemic needs of rural Kentucky families. She also recognized the trained nurse-midwife as necessary to the system. Though she had been raised in a prominent property owning family, she often served people who lived in poverty. She would follow the example of her Grandmother Lees, who used her resources to provide for children in need. A deeply religious woman, Breckinridge considered this path to be her life's calling.

The Forgotten Frontier, created by Mary Marvin Breckenridge, cousin to the founder of the Frontier Nursing Service, Mary Carson Breckenridge, documented the work of the nurses who traveled the countryside on horseback and significantly improved public health. Access Interview with Mary Marvin Breckinridge Patterson, May 13, 1978, at the Kentucky Oral History Project.

Breckinridge returned to the U.S. in 1925 and on May 28 of that year founded the Kentucky Committee for Mothers and Babies, which soon became the Frontier Nursing Service, which provided general health care, vaccinations, pre/post natal care, and birth services. She was joined by two midwives she met in London, Edna Rockstroh and Freda Caffin. Breckinridge, her father Colonel Breckinridge (took care of the horses), nurses Edna, Freda set up the first nurses clinic in 1925 and lived together in Hyden. As there were no reliable roads, the nurses depended on horses for transportation. The FNS demonstrated that well-trained midwives could bring down mortality rates of mothers and babies. They delivered the first baby in September 1925. The nurses traveled by horseback to deliver babies day and night, in all weather. She worked closely with Ann MacKinnon in setting up the Kentucky State Association of Midwives in 1930. FNS, with the generosity of Breckinridge's investment of her inheritance and many charitable donations, established The Frontier School of Midwifery and Family Nursing, a first of its kind in the U.S.

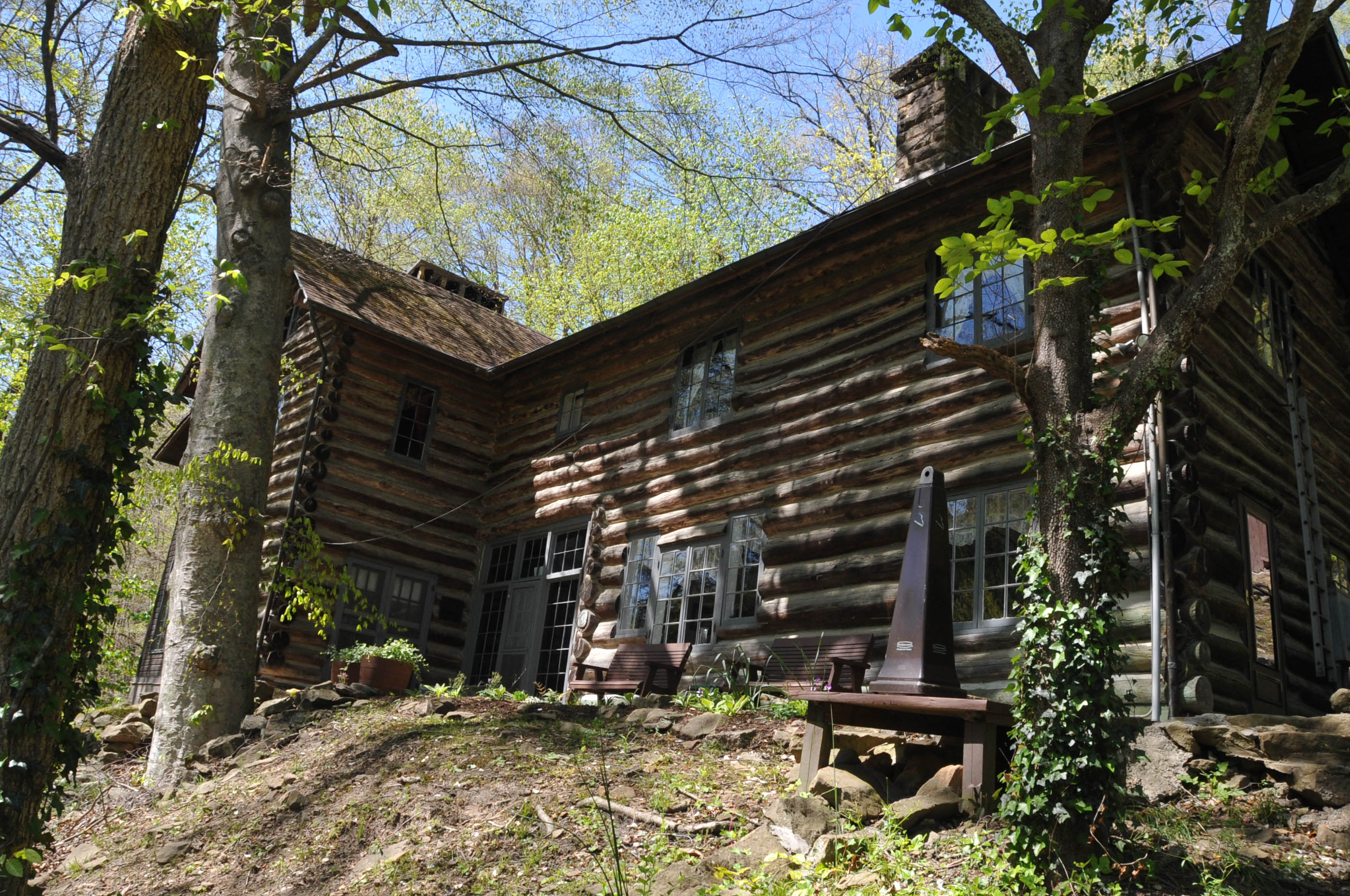
The Big House built in Wendover to start the Frontier Nursing Service

Breckinridge had a large log house, called the Big House, built in Wendover, Kentucky to serve as her home and the Frontier Nursing Service headquarters. In 1939 she started her own midwifery school. There, Breckinridge conducted Sunday afternoon services using the Episcopal prayer book. In 1952 she completed her memoir "Wide Neighborhoods" which is still available from the University of Kentucky Press.

She continued to lead the Frontier Nursing Service until her death on May 16, 1965, at Wendover. Upon her death, FNS had treated nearly 58K patients and delivered over 14,500 babies, with only 11 maternal deaths. Though Breckinridge's professional and largely autonomous nurse service demonstrated efficacy in reducing maternal and infant death at a time when reformers sought to remedy a recognized public health crisis, physician opposition, professional nursing ambivalence, and federal legislation (Sheppard-Towner Act) steered family health toward specialized interventions and rural hospitals. Nevertheless, the Frontier Nursing University continues to provide training for professional nurse-midwives.

Breckinridge's contributions were significant for several reasons, not the least of their impact on modern nursing services in rural Appalachia. She is credited with building the first modern comprehensive health care system in the United States that focused on all aspects of a patient's wellbeing and provided professionalization programs for nursing care and midwifery. Also significant to the southeastern Kentucky region specifically, she supported the growth of healthcare facilities in remote areas.

In spite of her accomplishments, the Mary Breckinridge Task Force (formed by Frontier Nursing University) did acknowledge in 2021 that Breckinridge did hold a number of racist beliefs. It was disclosed that she refused to hire Black midwives, and would refuse to share a table with one. She advocated for white superiority, and wrote about eugenics and the value of segregation, emphasizing brotherhood over equality.

== Honors ==
Breckinridge received the Medaille Reconnaissance Francaise for organizing a visiting nurse association while working with the American Committee for Devastated France. In 1952 she was named Kentuckian of the Year by the Kentucky Press Association. In 1995 she was inducted into the National Women's Hall of Fame.

In 1998 the United States Postal Service honored her with a 77¢ Great Americans series postage stamp. In 2010 an equestrian statue was dedicated to Breckinridge in Hyden, Kentucky.

== See also ==
- Breckinridge family
- Marvin Breckinridge Patterson
- The Forgotten Frontier
- Frontier Nursing Service

== Bibliography ==
Bailey, Colleen; Conatser, Trey; Harlow, Hayley; Kirk, Katie; Kowal, Elle; McCormick, Stephanie, Eds. (April 24, 2018). "Letters from Devastation: Mary Breckinridge in the Aisne, 1919". Retrieved April 14, 2020.
