= Brooke A. Flinders =

American nurse midwife and academic administrator

President of Frontier Nursing University
- Incumbent
- Assumed office August 1, 2024
- Preceded by: Susan Stone

Personal details
- Education: Miami University; Frontier Nursing University

Brooke A. Flinders is an American nurse midwife and academic administrator who is the incoming president of Frontier Nursing University.

== Life ==
Flinders earned an A.S. (1994) and B.S. (2003) in nursing from Miami University. She completed a M.S. in nursing and a doctor of nursing practice from Frontier Nursing University.

Flinders is a certified nurse-midwife. She became a fellow of the American College of Nurse-Midwives in 2021. She was a professor of nursing and an associate provost for faculty affairs at Miami University. On August 1, 2024, Flinders starts her role as the president of Frontier Nursing University.
