= Reva Rubin =

American nurse (1919–1995)

Reva Rubin (April 8, 1919 – Mary 13, 1995) was an American nurse, one of the first specialists in maternity nursing. Her work helped to broaden maternal nursing to include caring for the mother's mental wellbeing before and after childbirth.

== Career ==
Rubin received her bachelor's degree from Hunter College in 1941, and received her master's degree in nursing from Yale University in 1946. Rubin then started work with the Frontier Nursing Service. She worked with them as a midwife in impoverished parts of rural Kentucky before returning to Yale to complete her master's in mental health, which she received in 1954. She taught at the Yale School of Nursing and the University of Chicago before joining the faculty at the University of Pittsburgh, where she taught from 1960 to 1981.

Throughout her time teaching, she published articles on maternity and maternity nursing. Her published work of the 1960s broadened maternity nursing in theory and practice; whereas maternity nursing had focused previously on biology and physiology, Rubin's work brought the mental work of the mother into the conversation. In particular, Rubin differentiated maternal nursing from obstetric nursing. She argued that obstetric nurses' role only included helping the physician in the delivery of the child, whereas maternal nurses assisted the new mother in transitioning into her role as a mother. She published writings from 1961 onwards, culminating in her 1984 book published "The Maternal Identity and the Maternal Experience." Her early writings described the mental work of assuming motherhood as an identity and of connecting with a child. She also published work on mother-child relationships which spanned food and feeding, pregnancy, self-esteem and mental wellbeing. In 1972, she and Florence H. Erickson founded the first known research journal in the field of maternal nursing, Maternal Child Care Nursing Journal. They worked together at the University of Pittsburgh and established the university's first master's and doctoral degrees in nursing. In a 1988 review of her published work and contributions to maternity nursing, the authors concluded that advances in technology and shifts in medical and nursing practice and to hospital policy had made some of her psychosocial theories irrelevant to the mothers of 1988. For example, they noted that Rubin's analysis of a mother's cognitive state during pregnancy, centered around the uncertainty of her child's sex, had become less relevant since the introduction of ultrasound imaging.

=== Awards ===
The March of Dimes awarded Rubin their first annual Award in Nursing. In 1976 she received the Distinguished Service Award in Maternal-Child Nursing from the American Nurses Association. In 1992, she received an honorary doctorate from the University of Calgary.
