= Cary Millholland Parker =

American landscape architect

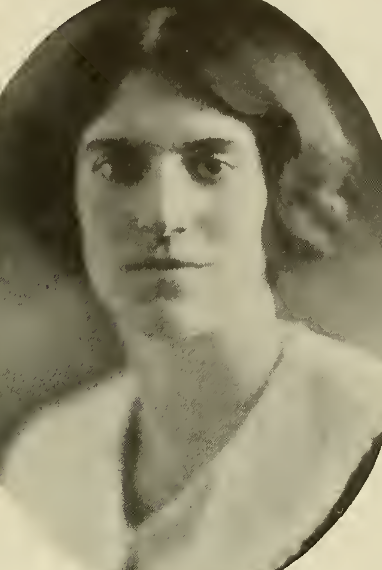
- Cary B. Millholland, from the 1924 Wellesley College yearbook
- Born: Cary Blunt Millholland; December 11, 1902; Cumberland, Maryland, United States
- Died: January 21, 2001 (aged 98)
- Education: Wellesley College; Cambridge School of Architecture and Landscape Architecture
- Occupation: Architect
- Spouse: Newton Belmont Parker
- Parent(s): James Allaire; Harriet Woodward Millholland
- Awards: Fellow, American Society of Landscape Architects; Medal of Merit, Garden Club of America
- Buildings: The Octagon House

Cary Millholland Parker (1902–2001) was an American landscape architect based in Washington, D.C.

== Education and personal life ==
Cary Blunt Millholland was born in Cumberland, Maryland, on December 11, 1902. She was one of five children of James Allaire and Harriet (or Harriett) Woodward Millholland. She graduated from Wellesley College in 1924 and then continued her studies informally while traveling around Europe and East Asia. Her travels in Asia developed her interest in trees as a landscape element. She went on to enroll in the landscape architecture program at the Cambridge School of Architecture and Landscape Architecture, from which she graduated in 1934.

In 1954, she married Newton Belmont Parker, who died in 1993. She died on January 21, 2001.

== Career ==
After obtaining her degree in landscape architecture, she worked in several different temporary jobs: for architect Gertrude Sawyer, for landscape architects Ellen Shipman and Rose Greely, and for the Historic American Buildings Survey. In 1937, she opened her own practice in Washington, D.C., which she ran for five years while also doing freelance drafting work for other firms around town.

Parker worked for the U.S. War Department during World War II, initially as a draftsperson and later overseeing the fabrication of relief maps for the Office of Strategic Services. After the war, she reopened her practice, which continued (with interruptions) until 1975.

During the 1950s, Parker's husband was stationed in Central America, and she accompanied him there, living in Nicaragua and Guatemala, where she collected orchids. After their return to the United States, she taught at the Catholic University of America (1960–1963).

Parker's landscape design projects include the central plaza at St. John’s College in Maryland; The Octagon House in Washington, D.C.; and elements of Point Farm in Calvert County, Maryland, which is now the Jefferson Patterson Park & Museum. She created the original plan for a garden for U.S. Secretary of State Christian Herter, later expanded on by landscape architect Perry Hunt Wheeler. She also worked with First Lady Lady Bird Johnson on several projects for beautifying Washington, D.C.

Parker was active in the American Society of Landscape Architects (ASLA), serving at various times as secretary, vice-president, and trustee of the Potomac chapter. She was elected a fellow of the ASLA in 1965. She was also a member of Society of Woman Geographers (SWG) and the Garden Club of America, which honored her with its Medal of Merit.

As part of an oral histories project, the Society of Woman Geographers conducted an interview with Parker in 1993; the interview by Ada Currier is in the SWG archives.
