= Benjamin F. Goodrich =

American industrialist

- Born: Benjamin Franklin Goodrich; November 4, 1841; Ripley, New York, U.S.
- Died: August 3, 1888 (aged 46); Manitou Springs, Colorado, U.S.
- Education: Fredonia Academy; Cleveland Medical College; University of Pennsylvania
- Occupation: Industrialist
- Known for: Founder of B.F. Goodrich Company
- Parent(s): Anson Goodrich; Susannah Dinsmoor Goodrich

Benjamin Franklin Goodrich (November 4, 1841 – August 3, 1888) was an American industrialist in the rubber industry and founder of the B.F. Goodrich Company.

== Early life ==
Goodrich was born in the farming town of Ripley, New York, on November 4, 1841. He was a son of Anson Goodrich (1792–1847) and Susannah (née Dinsmoor) Goodrich (born 1799). Orphaned at the age of eight, he was raised by his uncle.

He received his M.D. from Cleveland Medical College (now Case Western Reserve University School of Medicine) in 1861, studied surgery at the University of Pennsylvania in 1863 and served as a battlefront surgeon for the Union Army in the Civil War with the rank of captain. After a few years in a struggling medical practice, he went to work in Pennsylvania's oilfields and became a real estate speculator.

== Career ==
After the war, he reached a licensing agreement with Charles Goodyear and bought the Hudson River Rubber Company in partnership with J.P. Morris in 1869. The company, located in Melrose, New York, failed. The following year he accepted an offer of $13,600 from the citizens of Akron, Ohio to relocate his business there. He founded Goodrich, Tew & Co. in 1870. Goodrich bought out Tew, and in 1880 the company became the B.F. Goodrich Company.

Goodrich was the first in Akron to own a telephone, which was a gift from Alexander Graham Bell in 1877. The telephone connected Goodrich's house on Quaker Street to his factory on Rubber Street.

According to a story, Goodrich had seen a friend's home burn to the ground, with firefighters rendered helpless because their leather hoses had frozen and cracked. Once settled in Akron, Goodrich ordered his company to begin producing cotton-wrapped rubber hose that would resist freezing. A few years later Goodrich started selling garden hoses (allowing bucketless garden watering) and bicycle tires. Still, the company teetered near bankruptcy and went through numerous name changes, its success still uncertain when Goodrich died at the age of 46 in 1888.

Business began booming at B.F. Goodrich Company a few years after Goodrich's death with the company's introduction of a pneumatic tire that could endure the speed and load of the evolving automobile. The radial tire was designed by an advertising employee in his company. Over subsequent decades, Goodrich Company chemists invented plasticized polyvinyl chloride (PVC) in 1926, synthesized rubber in 1937 and built spacesuits for NASA astronauts in the 1960s. Now renamed Goodrich Corporation, the company abandoned the tire business in 1988 and subsequently described itself as a global supplier of systems and services to the aerospace, defense, and homeland security markets. In 2012 the Goodrich Corporation was sold to United Technologies.

The brand name BFGoodrich now appears on tires made by Michelin, which bought the Uniroyal Goodrich Tire Company in 1994.

== Personal life ==
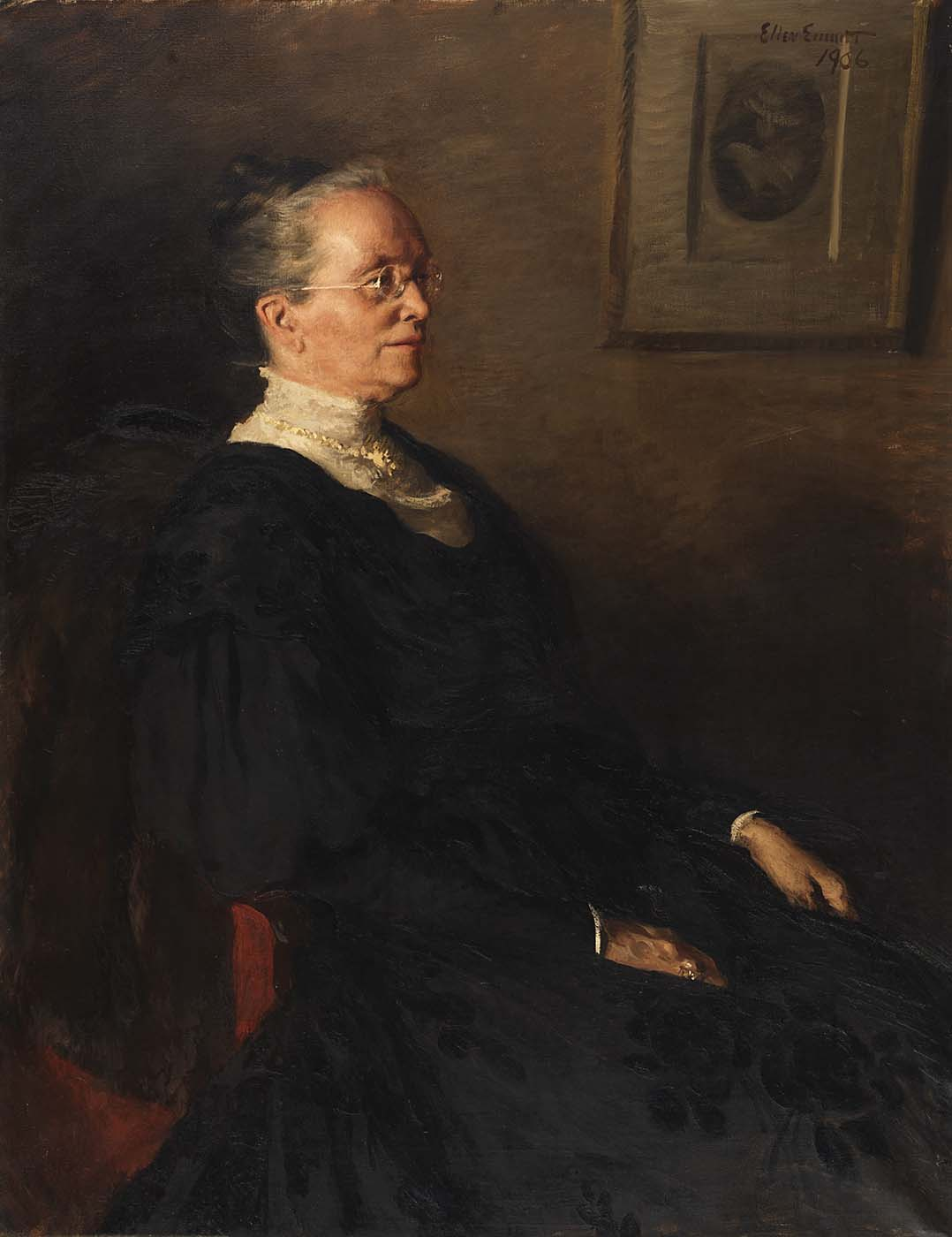
Portrait of his wife, by Ellen Emmet Rand, 1906

On November 4, 1869, Goodrich was married to Mary Elizabeth Marvin (1841–1907), a daughter of U.S. Representative Richard Pratt Marvin and Isabella (née Newland) Marvin. Her brother, Selden E. Marvin, served as Adjutant General of New York. Her uncle, William Marvin, was a United States federal judge and the 7th Governor of Florida. Together, Mary and Benjamin were the parents of:

- Charles Cross Goodrich (1871–1932), who was a Goodrich chemist and member of the Maine Legislature. He married Mary Anna Gellatly in 1895.
- Richard Marvin Goodrich (1872–1872), who died in infancy.
- Isabella Goodrich Breckinridge (1874–1961), who married John Cabell Breckinridge II (1870–1941), a grandson of John C. Breckinridge (the former Vice President of the United States under James Buchanan, a Confederate general and Confederate Secretary of War).
- David Marvin Goodrich (1876–1950), who became a Goodrich executive. He married Ruth Williams Pruyn, a daughter of banker Robert C. Pruyn in 1903. They divorced and in 1936 he married Beatrice (née Morgan) Pruyn, daughter of William Fellowes Morgan Sr. and the ex-wife of his first wife's brother.

Goodrich died on August 3, 1888, in Manitou Springs, Colorado, where he had been in hopes of improving his health. He was buried in at Lake View Cemetery in Jamestown, New York. After his death, his wife hired architect Guy Lowell in 1905 to design a 23-room mansion known as River House in York, Maine. His widow died in April 1907.

=== Descendants ===
Through his daughter Isabella, he was a grandfather of Marvin Breckinridge Patterson, the photojournalist, cinematographer, and philanthropist, who married diplomat Jefferson Patterson.
