= C.R. Breckinridge House =

Historic house in Arkansas, United States

- C. R. Breckinridge House
- U.S. National Register of Historic Places
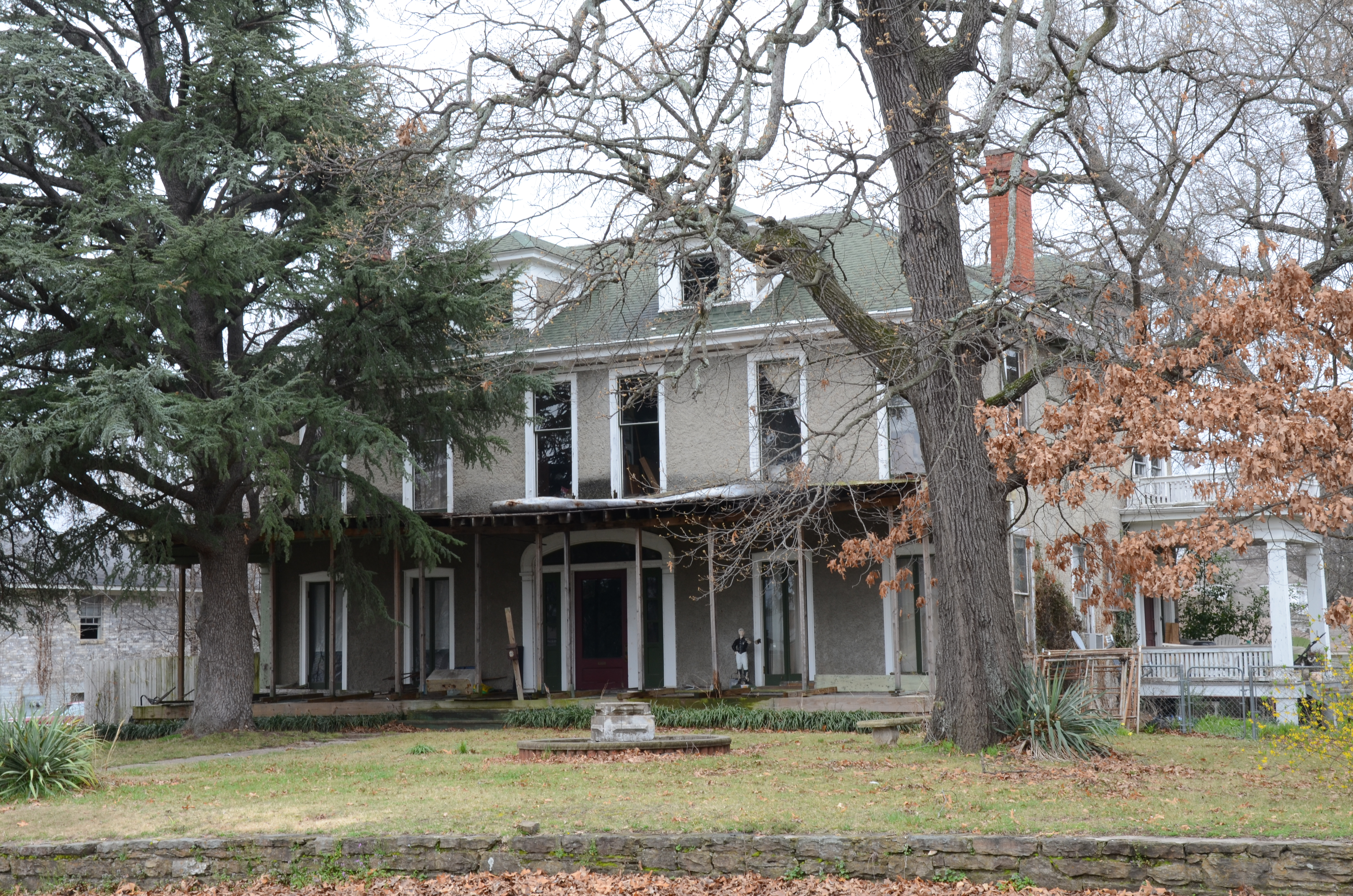

- Location within Arkansas Location within the United States
- Location: 504 N. 16th St., Fort Smith, Arkansas
- Coordinates: 35°23′9″N 94°24′47″W
- Area: less than one acre
- Built: 1903
- NRHP reference No.: 79000460
- Added to NRHP: August 7, 1979

The C.R. Breckinridge House is a historic house at 504 North 16th Street in Fort Smith, Arkansas. It is a large two-story structure, with a hip roof, stuccoed walls, and a fieldstone foundation. A porch extends across the front facade, supported by seven box columns, with an open veranda above. The main entrance is flanked by sidelight windows and topped by a half-oval transom window. The house was built in 1903 for Clifton R. Breckinridge, who represented the area in the United States Congress in the 1880s and 1890s, and was later United States Ambassador to Russia.

The house was listed on the National Register of Historic Places in 1979.

== See also ==
- National Register of Historic Places listings in Sebastian County, Arkansas
