= Isabella Breckinridge House =

Historic house in Maine, United States

- U.S. National Register of Historic Places
- Location within Maine Location within the United States
- Location: 201 US Route 1, York, Maine
- Coordinates: 43°08′27″N 70°41′18″W
- Architect: Guy Lowell
- Architectural style: Colonial Revival, Italian Villa
- NRHP reference No.: 80000263
- Added to NRHP: April 28, 1983

The Isabella Breckinridge House also known as River House, and formerly the Breckinridge Public Affairs Center of Bowdoin College, is a historic house at 201 US Route 1 in York, Maine, United States. The main house, designed by architect Guy Lowell, is a 23-room mansion which was built in 1905 for Mary Goodrich, widow of tire magnate B. F. Goodrich. It is located on a 26-acre (11 ha) estate facing the York River. The property was given to Bowdoin College by Mary Marvin Breckinridge Patterson in 1974, and the college operated it as a conference center until it was sold into private hands in 2004. The house was added to the National Register of Historic Places in 1983. It is one of Maine's most architecturally distinctive and unusual early 20th-century summer estate houses.

== Description and history ==
The Breckinridge House is located on the south side of US Route 1, just north of its crossing of the York River. It is set overlooking the river, and is screened from the road by woods. The house is a large 2 1/2-story painted brick structure that is roughly H-shaped, with a central block flanked by projecting wings. The main block has a hip roof with Dutch gables at the sides, while the wings, two stories in height, have flat roofs. The main facade is five bays wide, with a central entrance sheltered by a concave-roofed portico with wrought iron supports. Three gable-roofed dormers pierce the roof. The rear of the house, facing the river, is essentially identical. The river-facing elements of the wings have tall Colonial Revival round-arch windows. The interior of the house has Mediterranean styling, including stuccoed walls and wrought iron railings for the main staircase.

The house was designed by the noted Boston architect Guy Lowell, and was built in 1905. The original construction had a mansard roof on the central block. After the house was gutted by fire in the mid-1920s, the house was reconstructed to its present configuration; it is not known if Lowell did the design work for the repairs, which were completed in 1927, the year of his death. The house was built for Isabella Goodrich Breckinridge, the daughter of tire magnate B. F. Goodrich, and the wife of John Cabell Breckinridge III, the son of Kentucky politician John C. Breckinridge. Her descendant, philanthropist Mary Marvin Breckinridge Patterson, gave the property to Bowdoin College in 1974. Bowdoin operated it as a conference center until 2004, when it was sold into private hands.

The pool house, one of several outbuildings on the estate, suffered $50,000 in fire damage in 2011.

== See also ==
- National Register of Historic Places listings in York County, Maine
