= The Forgotten Frontier =

1931 film

- The full film
- Directed by: Marvin Breckinridge Patterson
- Starring: Mary Breckinridge
- Cinematography: Marvin Breckinridge Patterson
- Edited by: Marvin Breckinridge Patterson; Judy Herbert (restored version)
- Music by: silent
- Distributed by: Frontier Nursing Service
- Release date: 1931
- Running time: 59 minutes
- Country: United States
- Language: English

The Forgotten Frontier is a 1931 American documentary film about the Frontier Nursing Service, nurses on horseback, who traveled the back roads of the Appalachian Mountains of eastern Kentucky. It was directed by Mary Marvin Breckinridge, and featured her cousin, Mary Breckinridge, who was a nurse-midwife and founded the Frontier Nursing Service. Also featured are the people of Leslie County, Kentucky, many of whom reenacted their stories.

The film was shot with a hand-cranked camera, often in extreme climate. Stills created during the film's production are available at the Library of Congress.

A soundtrack was added in the 1990s by the Library of Congress.

In 1996, The Forgotten Frontier was selected for preservation in the United States National Film Registry as being deemed "culturally, historically, or aesthetically significant films".

Footage from the film was used in the 1984 documentary Frontier Nursing Service.
