= Wendover (Hyden, Kentucky) =

- U.S. National Register of Historic Places
- U.S. National Historic Landmark
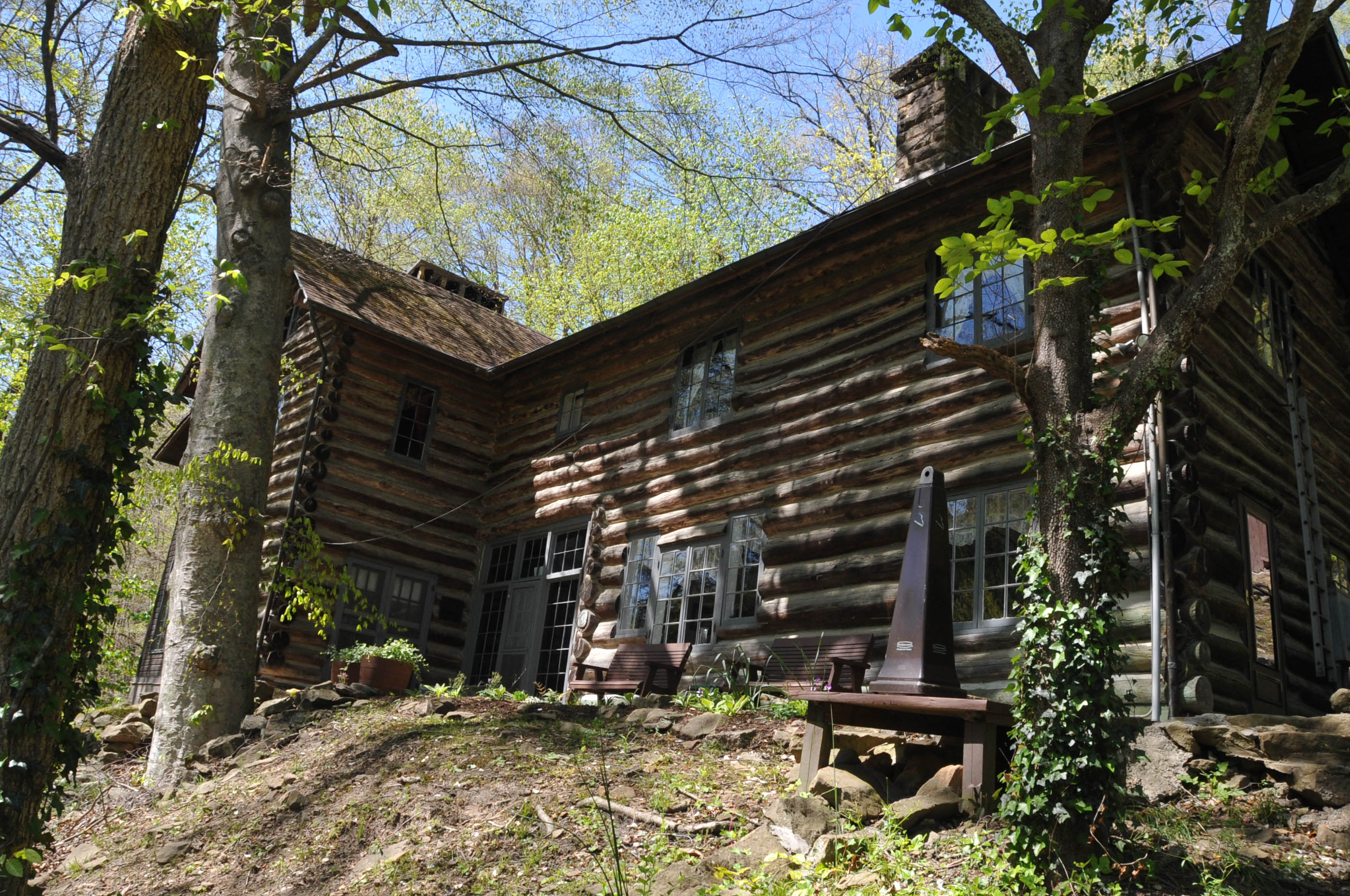

- Location within Kentucky Location within the United States
- Location: 132 FNS Drive, Wendover, Kentucky
- Coordinates: 37°7′39″N 83°21′55″W
- Area: 2.5 acres (1.0 ha) (NRHP area) less than one acre (NHL area)
- Built: 1925
- Architect: Mary Breckinridge
- Architectural style: Log house
- NRHP reference No.: 75000792

Significant dates
- Added to NRHP: October 21, 1975
- Designated NHL: July 17, 1991

Wendover, also known as Frontier Nursing Service or Big House, is a historic house and former medical care facility near Hyden, Kentucky. Built in 1925, it is notable for its association with the American effort to professionalize midwifery, led by Mary Breckinridge (1881–1965). It was headquarters of the Frontier Nursing Service, an organization which continues today. Wendover was named a U.S. National Historic Landmark in 1991 for this role. It now serves as a bed and breakfast inn and retreat operated by the Service's successor, Frontier Nursing University.

== Description and history ==
Wendover is located in a rural setting about 4 miles (6.4 km) south of Hyden, Kentucky on a south-facing hillside, overlooking the Middle Fork of the Kentucky River. The principal building of the complex now on the property is a 2 1/2-story log structure covered with gabled roofs. It is roughly laid out as two wings joined by a central section, having begun as a traditional dogtrot house. Two large stone chimneys project through the main roof line. Windows are typically of the casement style, with larger windows in the more public spaces of the ground floor.

Mary Breckinridge, a Tennessee native, was exposed from a relatively early age to both midwifery and nursing, formally studying the latter in the early 1900s. During the First World War she was exposed to rural community health services in Scotland, an idea she thought to transfer to rural parts of the United States. She chose rural eastern Kentucky in part for its daunting logistical difficulties. Wendover became her home and a training facility for a network of clinics she established in the region. The Frontier Nursing Services is now based out of facilities in Hyden, and its training service is now Frontier Nursing University. The Wendover property now serves as a retreat center and bed-and-breakfast inn.

== See also ==
- National Register of Historic Places listings in Leslie County, Kentucky
- List of National Historic Landmarks in Kentucky
