= Susan Stone (nurse) =

American nurse midwife and academic administrator

President of Frontier Nursing University
- In office 2001–2023
- Succeeded by: Brooke A. Flinders

Personal details
- Born: Utica, New York, U.S.
- Education: State University of New York; University of Tennessee Health Science Center

Susan E. Stone is an American nurse midwife and academic administrator who is the distinguished chair of midwifery at Frontier Nursing University. She was previously its president from 2001 to 2023.

== Life ==
Stone was born in Utica, New York. She earned an A.A.S. (1974) in nursing, a B.S. (1980) and a master's in nursing (1989) with a concentration in nursing administration from the State University of New York.

Stone first worked as an obstetrical nurse. In 1991, she completed a certificate via the nurse-midwifery education program at the Frontier School of Midwifery and Family Nursing. As a certified nurse-midwife, she practiced in Cooperstown, New York from 1991 to 1998. In 1998, she joined the faculty at Frontier School of Midwifery and Family Nursing as the program director of the nurse-midwifery education program. Stone was promoted to dean of nursing in May 2000. In 2001, she earned a Doctorate of Nursing Science from the University of Tennessee Health Science Center. Her dissertation was titled, Factors Associated with a High Rate of Cesarean Section in a Small Rural Hospital. Michael A. Carter was Stone's doctoral advisor.

Stone served as president of the Frontier Nursing University from 2001 to 2023. She was elected a fellow of the American College of Nurse-Midwives (ACNM) in 2005 and of the American Academy of Nursing in 2012. She served as the ACNM president from 2018 to 2019. In 2018, she was elected a member of the National Academy of Medicine. She transitioned to distinguished chair of midwifery in 2023.
