= Ayr County Hospital =

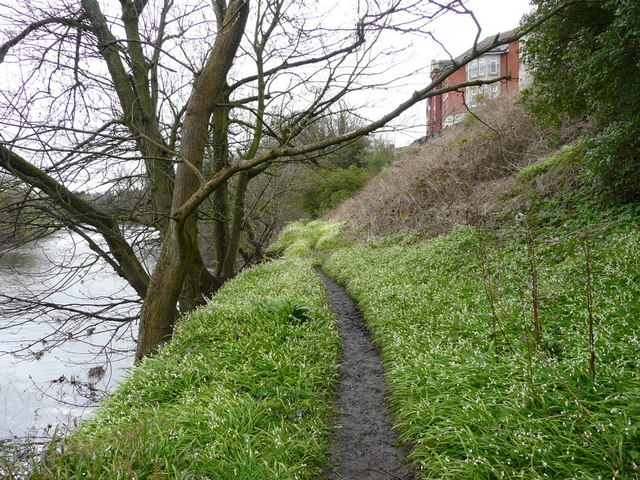
- Footpath next to the River Ayr below the site of the old Ayr County Hospital

- Shown in South Ayrshire

Geography
- Location: Holmston Road, Ayr, South Ayrshire, Scotland
- Coordinates: 55.4578°N 4.6213°W

Organisation
- Care system: NHS Scotland
- Type: General

History
- Founded: 1817
- Closed: 1991

Links
- Lists: Hospitals in Scotland

Ayr County Hospital was a health facility in Holmston Road, Ayr, South Ayrshire, Scotland.

== History ==
The facility had its origins in an establishment known as the Ayr, Newton and Wallacetown Dispensary which opened in 1817 and was replaced by a hospital in Mill Street in 1844. It moved to purpose-built facilities in Holmston Road, designed by John Murdoch (1825-1907), in 1882. It joined the National Health Service in 1948. After services transferred to the new Ayr Hospital, Ayr County Hospital closed in 1991 and was subsequently demolished.
