= Frontier Nursing University =

Private university in Versailles, Kentucky

- Type: Private graduate school of nursing
- Established: 1939
- President: Brooke A. Flinders
- Dean: Kristin Ashford
- Students: 2700
- Location: Versailles, Kentucky, United States; 38°9′56″N 83°22′45″W
- Website: frontier.edu

Frontier Nursing University is a private graduate school of nursing in Versailles, Kentucky. It was established by the Frontier Nursing Service in 1939 as the Frontier School of Midwifery and Family Nursing.

== History ==
Frontier Nursing University was founded in 1939 as the Frontier Graduate School of Midwifery. The Frontier Graduate School of Midwifery graduated its first class in 1940. In 1970, the school was renamed the Frontier School of Midwifery and Family Nursing with the opening of the nation's first family nurse practitioner education program. In 1989/1990, as a joint effort of the Frontier Nursing Service, Case Western Reserve University, the Maternity Center Association, and the National Association of Childbearing Centers, the Community-based Nurse-midwifery Education Program was born. Hence, Frontier became the first graduate school of nurse-midwifery to offer distance education. In 2005, the Community-Based Women's Health Care Nurse Practitioner option was added. In 2011, Frontier School of Midwifery and Family Nursing became Frontier Nursing University to underscore the distinct graduate-level programs while reflecting the institution's history and vision.

=== Presidents ===
- Susan Stone, 2001–2023
- Brooke A. Flinders, 2024–present

== Academics ==
Frontier Nursing University focuses exclusively on distance nursing education with a strong focus on training nurses to provide advanced care to rural and underserved communities. It offers a Master of Science in Nursing, post-Master's certificate, and Doctor of Nursing Practice (DNP) with speciality certification leading to education as a Family Nurse Practitioner, Certified Nurse Midwife, Women's Healthcare Nurse Practitioner, or Psychiatric-Mental Health Nurse Practitioner.

The school is accredited by the Commission on Colleges of the Southern Association of Colleges and Schools, Accreditation Commission for Midwifery Education, and the National League for Nursing Accrediting Commission.

The institution is tied number 53 overall in "Best Nursing Schools: Master's" in U.S. News & World Report's 2022 rankings. Four of the institution's programs are individually ranked:

- #67 in Best Online Master's in Nursing Programs
- #3 in Best Online Family Nurse Practitioner Master's Programs (tie)
- #37 in Best Nursing Schools: Doctor of Nursing Practice
- #27 in Nursing-Midwifery (tie)

== Campus ==
The campus moved from its original home in Hyden, Kentucky, to a wooded setting in Versailles, Kentucky in 2020.
