= National Student Federation of America =

Student political organizations in the United States

The National Student Federation of America or NSFA was an association of student government founded in 1925. It was the first national student government association to be formed in the United States.

NSFA maintained a strong interest in international affairs, serving as a member of the Confédération Internationale des Étudiants. It was supportive of civil liberties and student rights, but did little actual organizing. Its most famous president was Edward R. Murrow, elected in 1930.

Two hundred campuses sent representatives to NSFA's first full conference in 1926, and the Federation had a membership of 150 schools by 1933. It had no salaried officers, however, and only minimal paid staff.

NSFA disbanded during the Second World War, and was succeeded as a national association of student governments by the National Student Association, founded in 1947.
