= Jefferson Patterson =

American diplomat

Jefferson Patterson (14 May 1891 – 12 November 1977) was an American diplomat who served as United States Ambassador to Uruguay under Dwight D. Eisenhower, from 1956 to 1958. He married Mary Marvin Breckinridge Patterson in 1940. He also had assignments in Berlin, Belgium, Egypt, Greece, and the UN Special Committee on the Balkans. He also wrote a book, Diplomatic Duty and Diversion. Patterson additionally worked at the U.S. Embassy in Paris during World War II, and was in charge of French prisoners of war before the transfer of protecting power from the United States to Vichy France.

He graduated from Yale College and Harvard Law School.

== See also ==
- Jefferson Patterson Park & Museum

Diplomatic posts
Preceded by Dempster McIntosh	United States Ambassador to Uruguay; 1956–1958	Succeeded by Robert F. Woodward
