= Frontier Nursing Service =

American rural healthcare service

- U.S. National Register of Historic Places
- U.S. Historic district
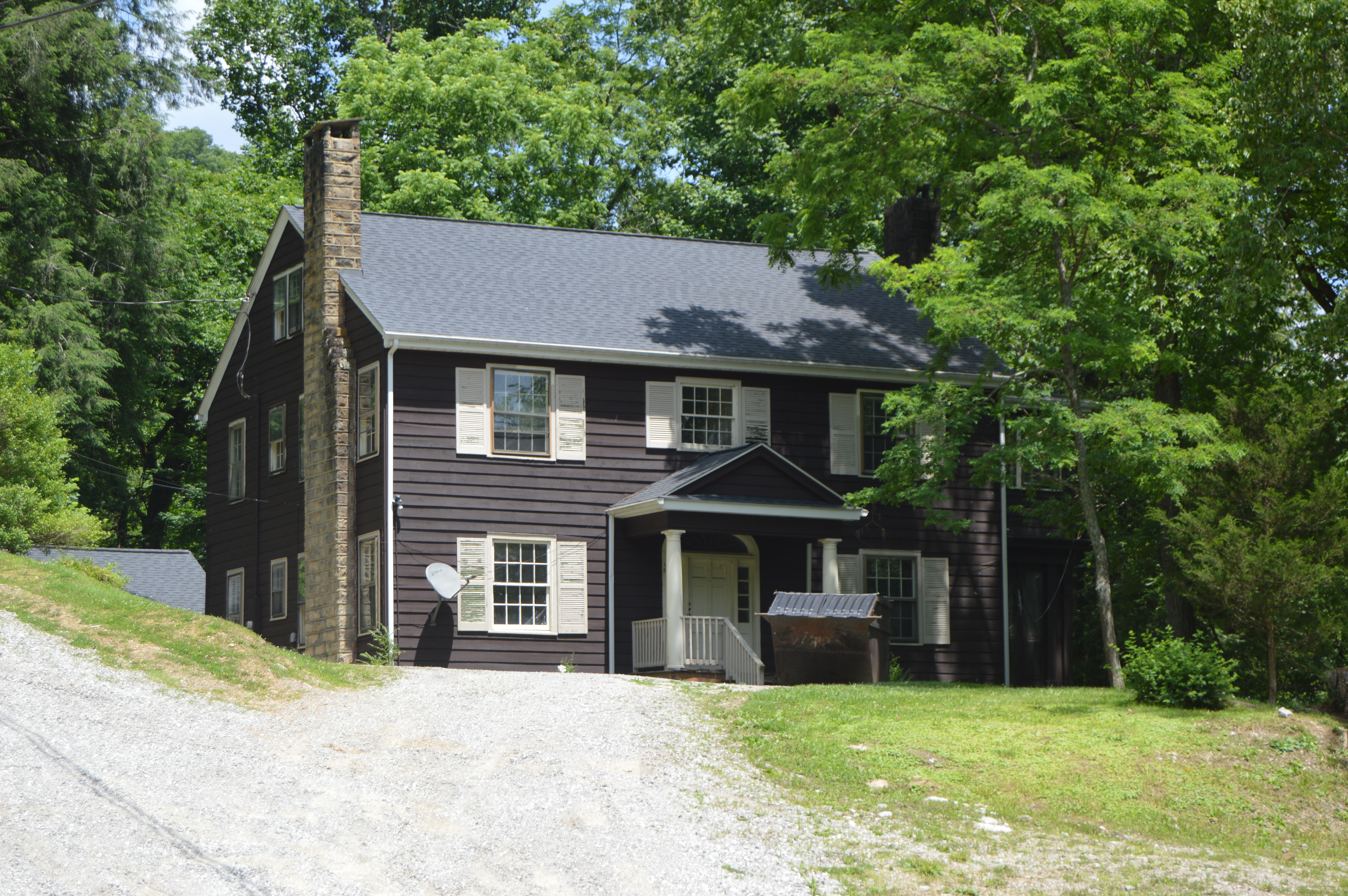
- Location: Hospital Hill, off Hickory St., Hyden, Kentucky, U.S.
- Coordinates: 37°09′55″N 83°22′45″W
- Area: 2.3 acres (0.93 ha)
- Built: 1928
- NRHP reference No.: 90002126
- Added to NRHP: January 11, 1991

The Frontier Nursing Service (FNS) provides healthcare services to rural, underserved populations in Kentucky since 1925, and educates nurse-midwives since 1939.

The Service maintains six rural healthcare clinics in eastern Kentucky: the Mary Breckinridge Hospital (now part of Appalachian Regional Healthcare), the Mary Breckinridge Home Health Agency, the Frontier Nursing University and the Bed and Breakfast Inn at Wendover, Kentucky.

== History ==
=== Establishment of FNS and early years ===
The organization was founded in 1925 in Leslie County, Kentucky by Mary Breckinridge (1881–1965) shortly after she had witnessed the operation of the Highlands and Islands Medical Service which had been founded in Scotland twelve years earlier. Before choosing Leslie County, she surveyed Leslie, Knott, and Owsley counties to assess the needs of women and families, interviewing local midwives and documenting their backgrounds and practices. On her travels, she spoke with midwives, recording data such as age, birthplace, literacy status, number of years in practice, cleanliness, and number of children reared for each midwife she spoke to. Breckinridge, a 1910 graduate of St. Luke's Hospital of Nursing in New York, chose the region because of its remote location, lack of licensed physicians, and her family's longstanding ties to Kentucky. Breckinridge served as Director until her death in 1965.

Breckinridge established the Frontier Nursing Service to improve maternal and child healthcare in rural Appalachia after the deaths of her two young children, Polly, who died four hours after her birth, and Breckie, who died four days after his fourth birthday. At the time, maternal and infant mortality rates in the United States remained high, and debates over whether physicians or midwives should oversee childbirth were ongoing. Frontier Nursing Service was the first group in the United States to employ nurses who were also qualified midwives. Because there were no midwifery schools in the United States, FNS was able to secure qualified staff by offering scholarships to American nurses to study in Great Britain or by hiring qualified midwives from Great Britain. Originally, the organization was known as the Kentucky Committee for Mothers and Babies.

The Frontier Nursing Service grew rapidly during its first five years. With the help of two nurses, Edna Rockstroh and Freda Caffin, Breckinridge opened the group's first clinic in Hyden, Kentucky in 1925. The demand for the clinic grew rapidly, and within the first month of operation, Breckinridge and two nurse-midwives served 233 patients. By December of that year Breckinridge had raised a log house in Wendover, Kentucky, called the Big House, that became her home and the Frontier Nursing Service's headquarters. The Hyden Hospital and Health Center opened its doors in 1928 and was followed by nine outpost nursing centers in Leslie County and the Red Bird River section of Clay County, Kentucky. To center the outposts, Breckinridge did not use the county boundaries, instead, she located the outposts nine to twelve miles away from each other on the waterways and the natural routes of travel and trade. By that time, FNS covered 60 miles of territory.

Because of the remote location of the service and the communities it served, nurses had to travel by horseback. With this being said, Mary Breckinridge recruited couriers for the Frontier Nursing Service. The couriers were companions for the nurses. When they needed to go to a case the couriers were knowledgeable of the surrounding areas and trails and helped the nurses stay on track. Even on a ride late at the night, the nurses were never alone. In an article written by Anne Cockerham, she mentions that couriers were more than a GPS. A courier could be described as a right-hand man to the nurse. Whether it is taking them places, setting up their supplies, or just being there for support, couriers are very important for the Frontier Nursing Service. During these early years, nurses with equestrian experience had to be recruited from Great Britain, where Breckinridge had learned about modern midwifery, because there were no midwifery schools in the United States. She did send interested American women abroad tor education, paying for all of their expenses, provided they agreed to work for the Frontier Nursing Service for two years. The women who worked for the service traveled to remote locations, many without running water or electricity, providing care to people who were considered wild or even "foreign" to Americans in more populated areas.

=== Development of the Frontier Graduate School of Midwifery ===
Upon the outbreak of World War II Breckinridge no longer could send American nurses to Britain where they had been going for midwifery training. To prevent this from slowing its operations, the Frontier Nursing Service quickly established the Frontier Graduate School of Midwifery. The first class matriculated in November 1939, and the school has operated ever since. The 6-month course was based on the curriculum of the Central Midwives Board of England and Scotland, and every student was required to participate in 20 midwifery cases. The first two classes were paid for by scholarships. Reva Rubin who was one of the first specialists in maternity nursing worked here. FNS trained students and for other agencies. By 1952, 122 graduates worked in the U.S. and foreign countries such as the Philippines, Japan, Alaska, India, Thailand, Africa, South Africa, and Latin America. By 1966, 285 qualified nurse-midwives worked in the U.S. and abroad, including The Philippines, New Guinea, Thailand, South Korea, Canada, France and some parts of Africa and South America. In 1970, the school's name was changed to the Frontier School of Midwifery and Family Nursing (FSMFN). Now named Frontier Nursing University, it offers distance education to train its students. The Frontier Nursing Service was the subject of the 1931 documentary film, The Forgotten Frontier.

=== Addition of Family Nursing Education ===
As the number of births decreased in Leslie County during the 1980s it became difficult to support a traditional midwifery program. During this time period, the Community-based Nurse-midwifery Education Program (CNEP) began as a pilot project funded by the PEW Foundation. The development of the CNEP was originally a cooperative effort of the Maternity Center Association (MCA), the National Association of Childbearing Centers (NACC), Frances Payne Bolton School of Nursing, Case Western Reserve University (FPBSON/CWRU) and the Frontier Nursing Service (FNS). The goal was to enable nurses to remain in their communities while obtaining graduate education as nurse-midwives and ultimately increase the number of practicing nurse-midwives working in underserved areas. Through an affiliation with FPBSON/CWRU students completed a certificate education with FSMFN and attained a master's degree in nursing by completing nine credits on the FPBSON/CWRU campus in Cleveland, Ohio. The pilot project was very successful. In 1990, the FSMFN recognized that the CNEP model of education matched its own goals and mission. The President of the School and the Board of Directors voted to adopt the CNEP as its nurse-midwifery education program in 1991. Since then, FSMFN has graduated over 1000 nurse-midwives.

In the late 1960s, the Frontier Nursing Service recognized that as health care options became more complex, a broader based education was necessary for nurses to be able to provide comprehensive primary care to all family members. At this time the FSMFN developed the first certificate program to prepare family nurse practitioners. In 1970, the name of the school was changed to the Frontier School of Midwifery and Family Nursing (FSMFN) to reflect the addition of the FNP program. The last class to graduate from the combined family nurse-midwifery program was in August 1990. The Community-based Family Nurse Practitioner (CFNP) education program was reestablished in 1999 using the CNEP distance education model. With the acceptance of CFNP class 1 in 1999, the Frontier School of Midwifery and Family Nursing comes full circle in its mission to educate nurses to provide primary care that is comprehensive, safe, and culturally sensitive.

The Frontier Nursing Service Complex was listed on the National Register of Historic Places in 1991. The listing included four contributing buildings and nine contributing structures.

=== Frontier Nursing University ===
In 2000, recognizing that students desired to complete their entire education at FSMFN using distance education methods, the board of directors approved a plan for FSMFN to pursue full accreditation as an independent graduate school which would grant a Master of Science in nursing. There was much work to be done including a complete curriculum revision and the preparation of the faculty at the doctoral level. On December 6, 2004, the school was accredited by the Southern Association of Colleges and Schools to grant a Master of Science in Nursing Degree. The American College of Nurse-Midwives granted institutional accreditation as well as programmatic accreditation for the nurse-midwifery program in February 2005. National League for Nursing accreditation followed in March 2005. In 2011, the school changed its name to Frontier Nursing University to emphasize its capacity to offer graduate degrees in nursing.

Today the university offers several programs geared towards nurses who desire to pursue preparation as a nurse-midwife or nurse practitioner. These include a Master of Science in Nursing degree with tracks as a nurse-midwife, family nurse practitioner and women's health nurse practitioner. FSMFN also offers post-masters certificates in these specialties. In July 2016, the university added an online program for nurse-midwives and nurse practitioners for post-graduate certification in psychiatric-mental health nursing. FSMFN now has graduates representing every state in the United States and seven foreign countries.

In 2024 Frontier Nursing Service partnered with Ob Hospitalist Group to make the nursing program stronger. For the FNS clinical rotations, many of the students had to travel far and were not close to home. With this new connection the OBHG provides more clinical locations around the United States so that all students can work hard, while not having to travel an insane amount of miles to learn. There are already 22 programs placed around the country and they are still expanding to this day.

== Impact ==
- During its first thirty years of operation, all of the Frontier Nursing Service's maternal and infant outcome statistics were better than for the country as a whole. For example:

The maternal mortality rate for Frontier Nursing Services was 9.1 per 10,000 births, compared with 34 per 10,000 births for the United States as a whole. Only 3.8 percent of babies tended by the Frontier Nursing Service had low birth weight, compared with 7.6 percent for the country overall.

- From 1938 to 1939, FNS field nurses carried 8,377 people, 4,978 of which were children. There were 25,135 visits at nursing centers.
- By 1959, Frontier Nursing Service nurse-midwives had attended over 10,000 births
- From 1964 to 1965, FNS nurses attended 10,446 patients in 12 districts. The nurse-midwives and students provided prenatal, childbirth care during labor and delivery, and postpartum care to 369 women.

- In 1972, the Service opened the forty-bed Mary Breckinridge Hospital and Health Center in Leslie County.
- In 2011 after years of operating in the red and stopping services, Frontier Nursing Service sold Mary Breckenridge Hospital to Appalachian Regional Healthcare, completed on October 10, 2011.
- In 2017, the Frontier Nursing Service purchased a campus in Versailles, KY. Since then, Frontier Nursing has talked about moving its entire nursing school to Versailles.
- On September 26, 2019, a post on social media from a board of directors meeting created a major public backlash when the meeting minutes showed the board was considering moving the cabin where Breckenridge used to practice nursing and live, the Breckenridge House.

== Relocation of Frontier Nursing University ==
In 2018, the Frontier Nursing University (FNU) fully moved out of Leslie County and to Versailles, Kentucky, despite its founder's mission to serve the mountain people of rural Kentucky. Their institutional mission statement reads, "Our mission is to provide accessible nurse-midwifery and nurse practitioner education that integrates the principles of diversity, equity, and inclusion. We transform healthcare by preparing innovative, ethical, compassionate, and entrepreneurial leaders to work with all people with an emphasis on rural and underserved communities."

In a statement about the move, FNU claimed "the new 67-acre campus in that FNU purchased in Versailles will continue to keep the University in a rural county but is also less than ten minutes from the Lexington Bluegrass Airport and accessible from major highways." Woodford County, Kentucky, the county where Versailles resides, is classified as a metro area according to the USDA Economic Research Service, not rural.

In addition to moving all FNU operations to metro Versailles, Kentucky, FNU attempted to remove a stained glass window belonging to the St. Christopher's Chapel in Hyden, Kentucky to be installed at their new campus in Central Kentucky leading to Congressman Hal Rogers to make this statement, "Quite frankly, the action taken by this board to quietly remove the stained-glass window, as well as the educational operations from Leslie County, does not align with Mary Breckinridge’s legendary heart of service and courageous action for the Appalachian people." A petition on change.org called for the return of the stained glass window to the chapel and had garnered over 3,700 signatures. Return of the stained glass window to the original chapel in Hyden, Kentucky has not been confirmed.

== Kentucky Law ==
In 2019, the General Assembly of the Commonwealth of Kentucky passed Senate Bill 84 to provide certification and regulation for midwives, as well as creating a new public council to implement new licensure requirements. Kentucky stopped certifying midwives in 1975, and there have been no clear regulations on the practice for more than thirty years. The advisory council is set up under the Board of Nursing, which will promulgate regulations to establish standards for training programs, licensing, transfer of care from a midwife to a hospital, disciplinary actions, and more, as well as define a list of conditions that require the collaboration, consultation or referral of a client to a physician or other appropriate healthcare provider.

The law also criminalizes unlicensed midwife services, although it does provide exceptions for traditional birth attendants for religious or cultural purposes and for family members and friends providing uncompensated care. It is unclear how these statutory terms will be interpreted and enforced.
