= List of Teachers College, Columbia University alumni =

Following is a list of notable alumni of Teachers College, Columbia University.

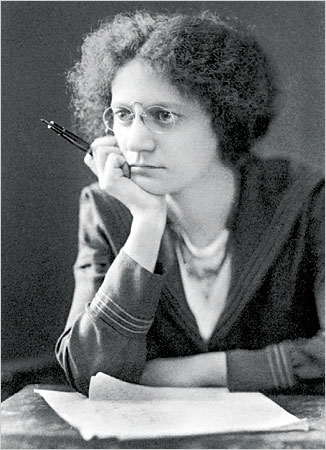
Mary Antin

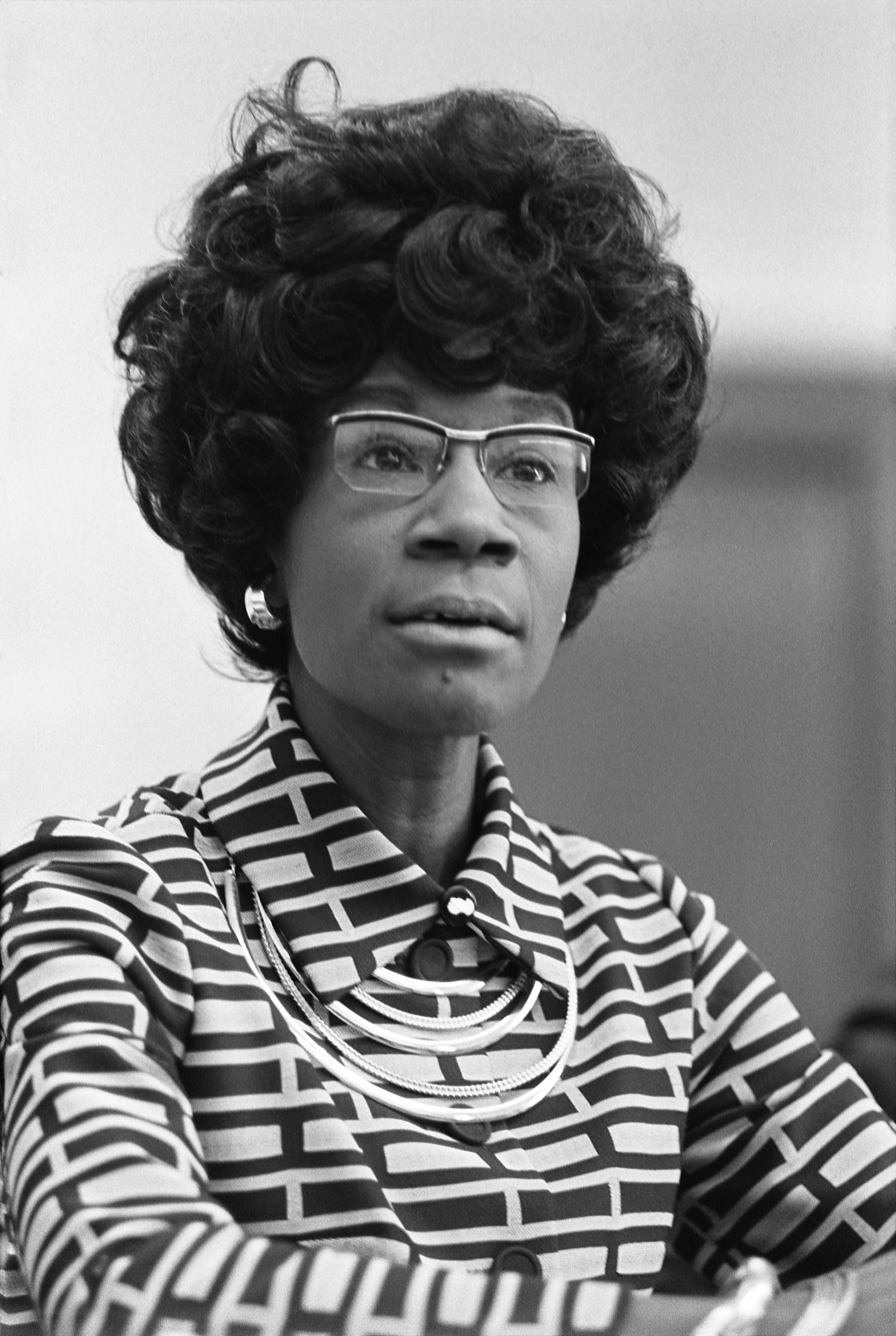
Shirley Chisholm

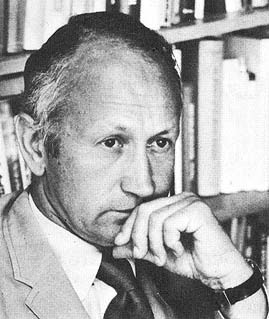
Norman Cousins

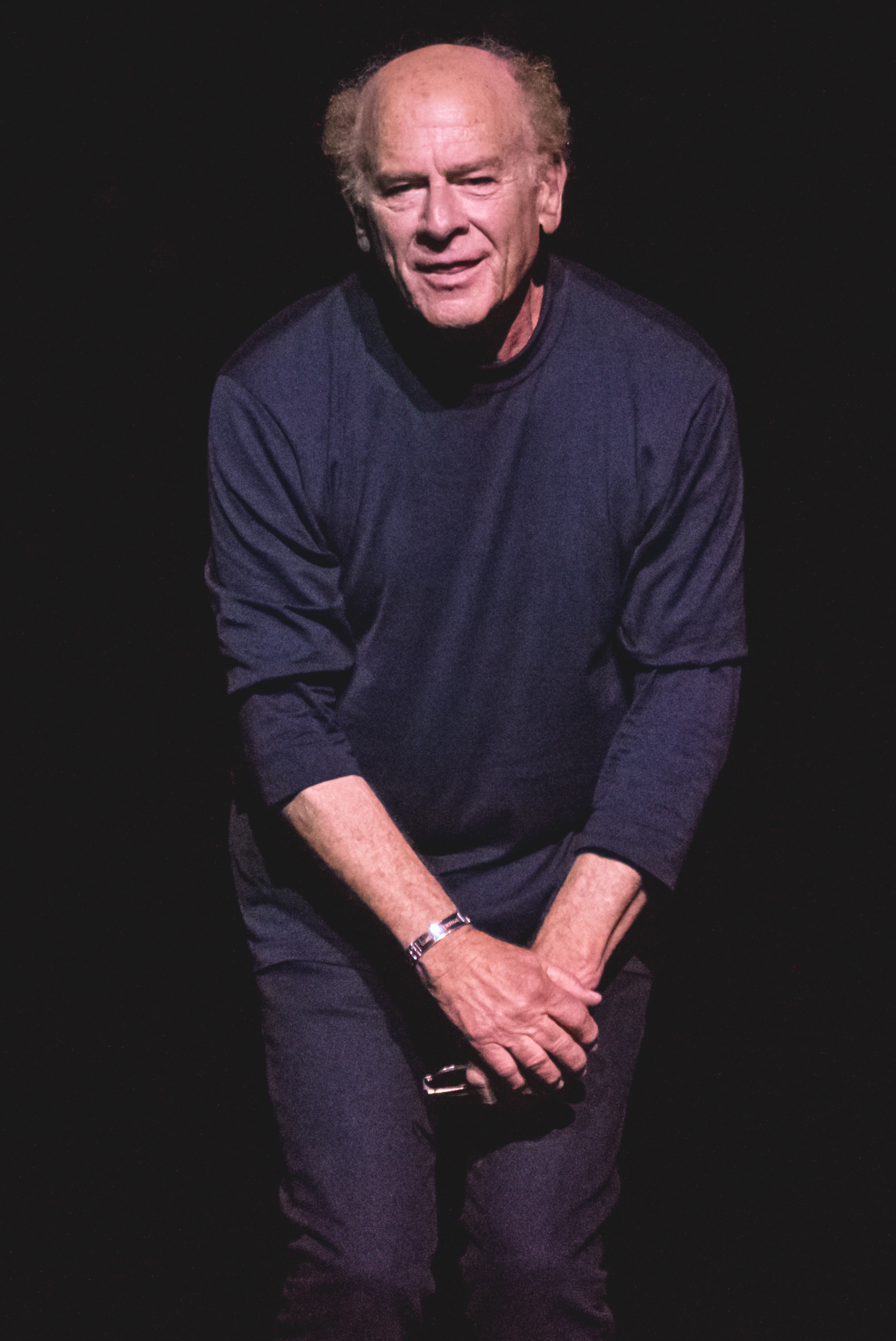
Art Garfunkel

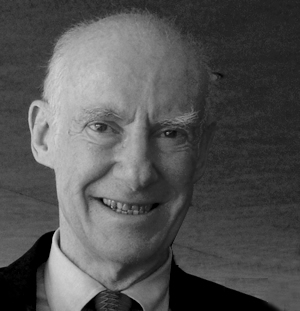
Martin Haberman

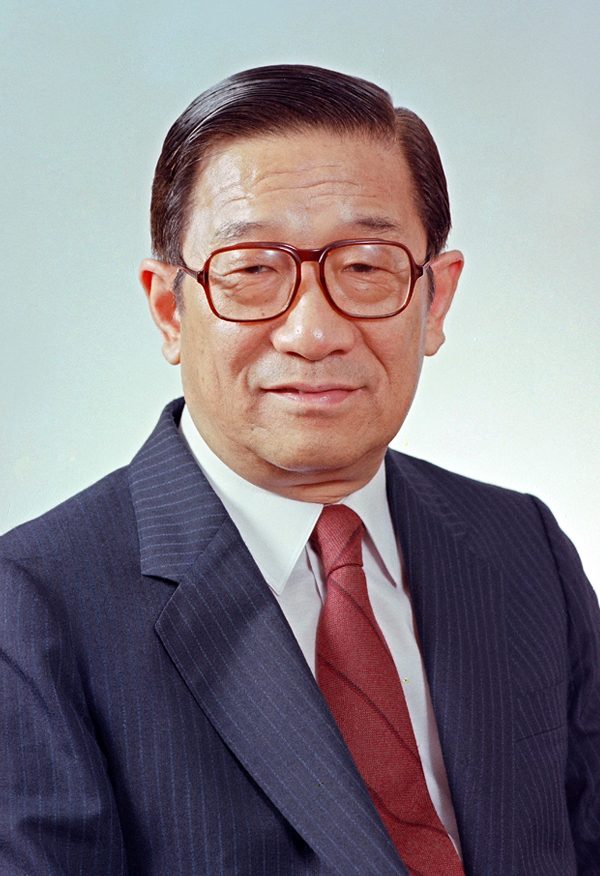
Lee Huan

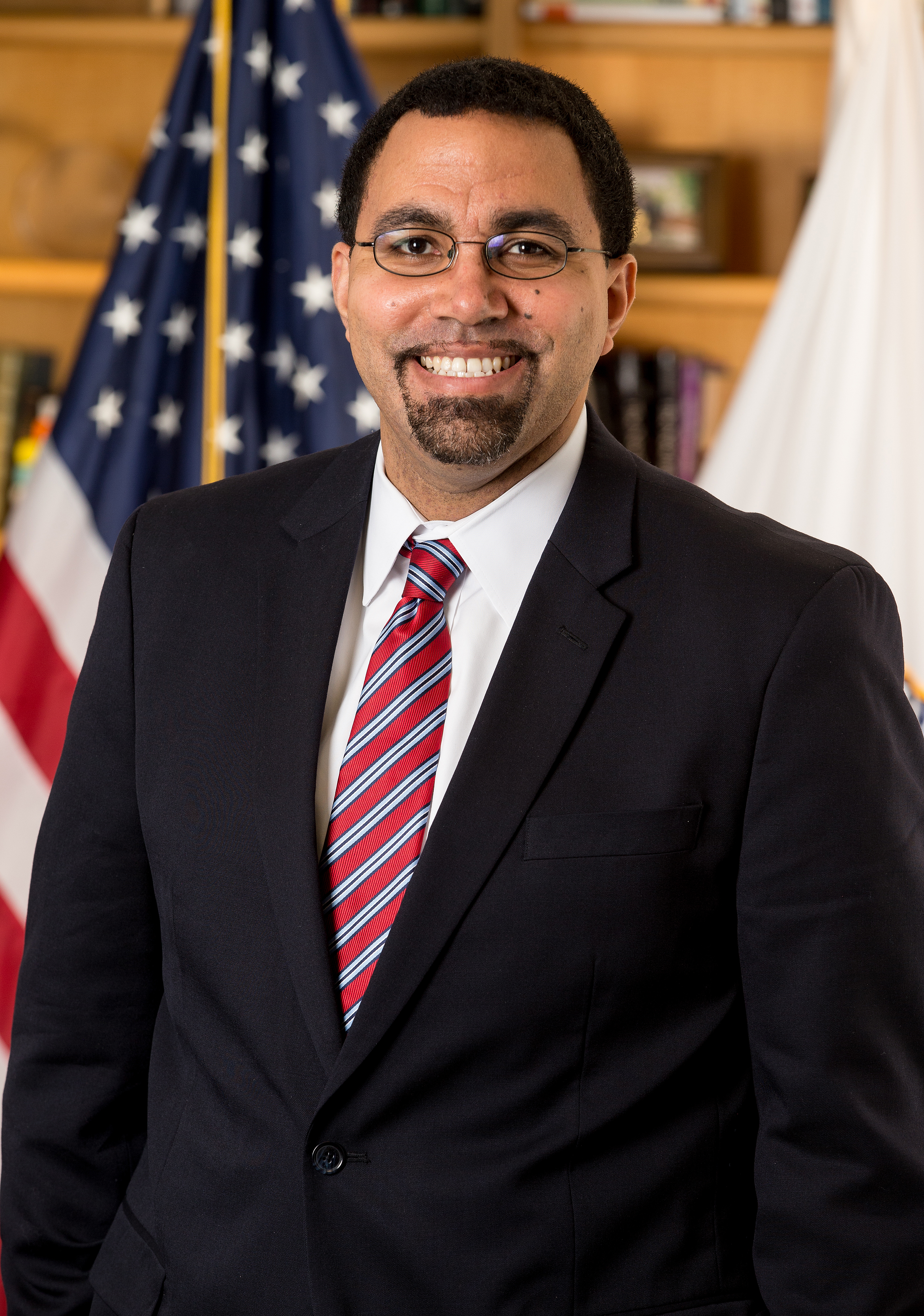
John King Jr.

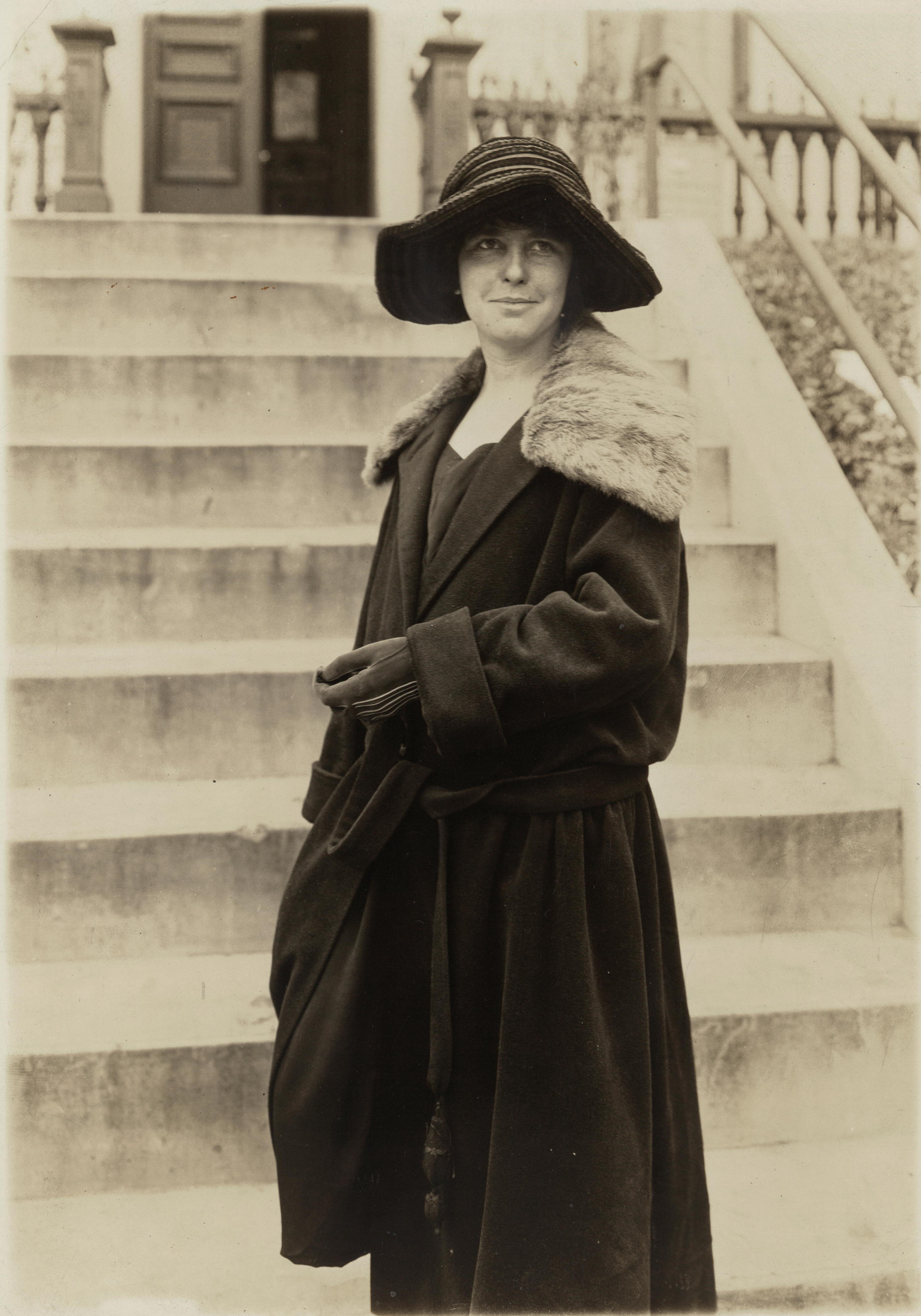
Anita Pollitzer

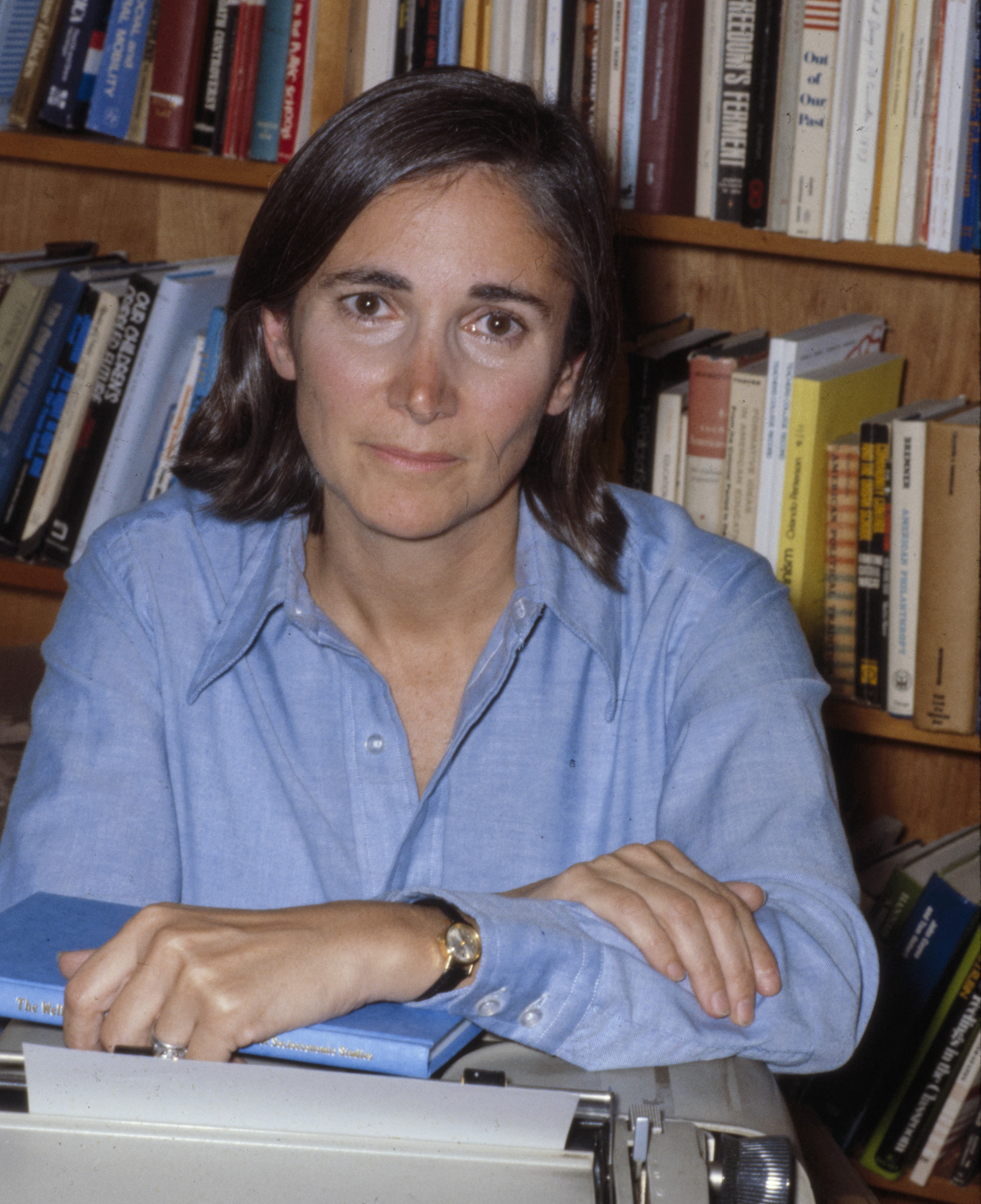
Diane Ravitch

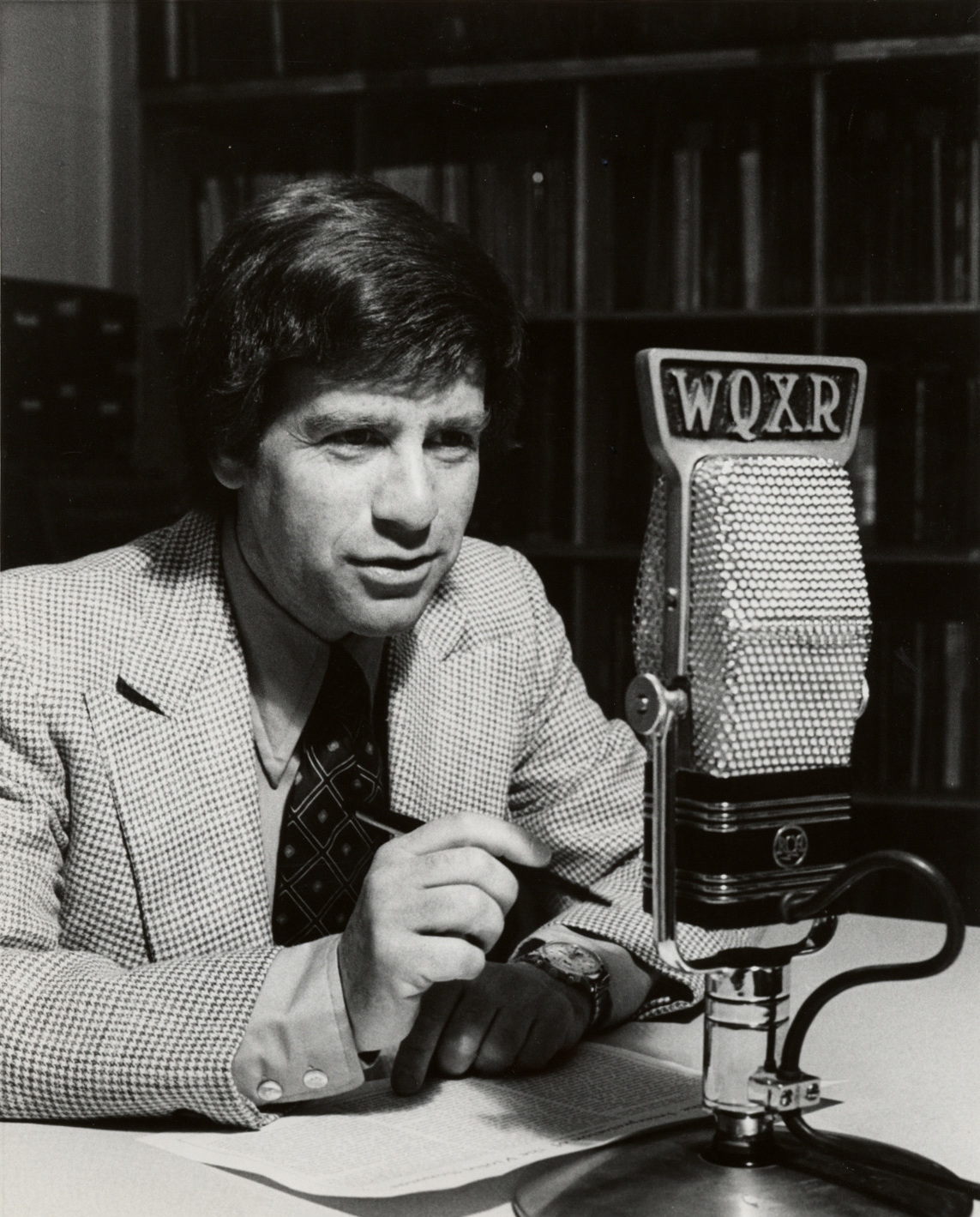
Robert Sherman

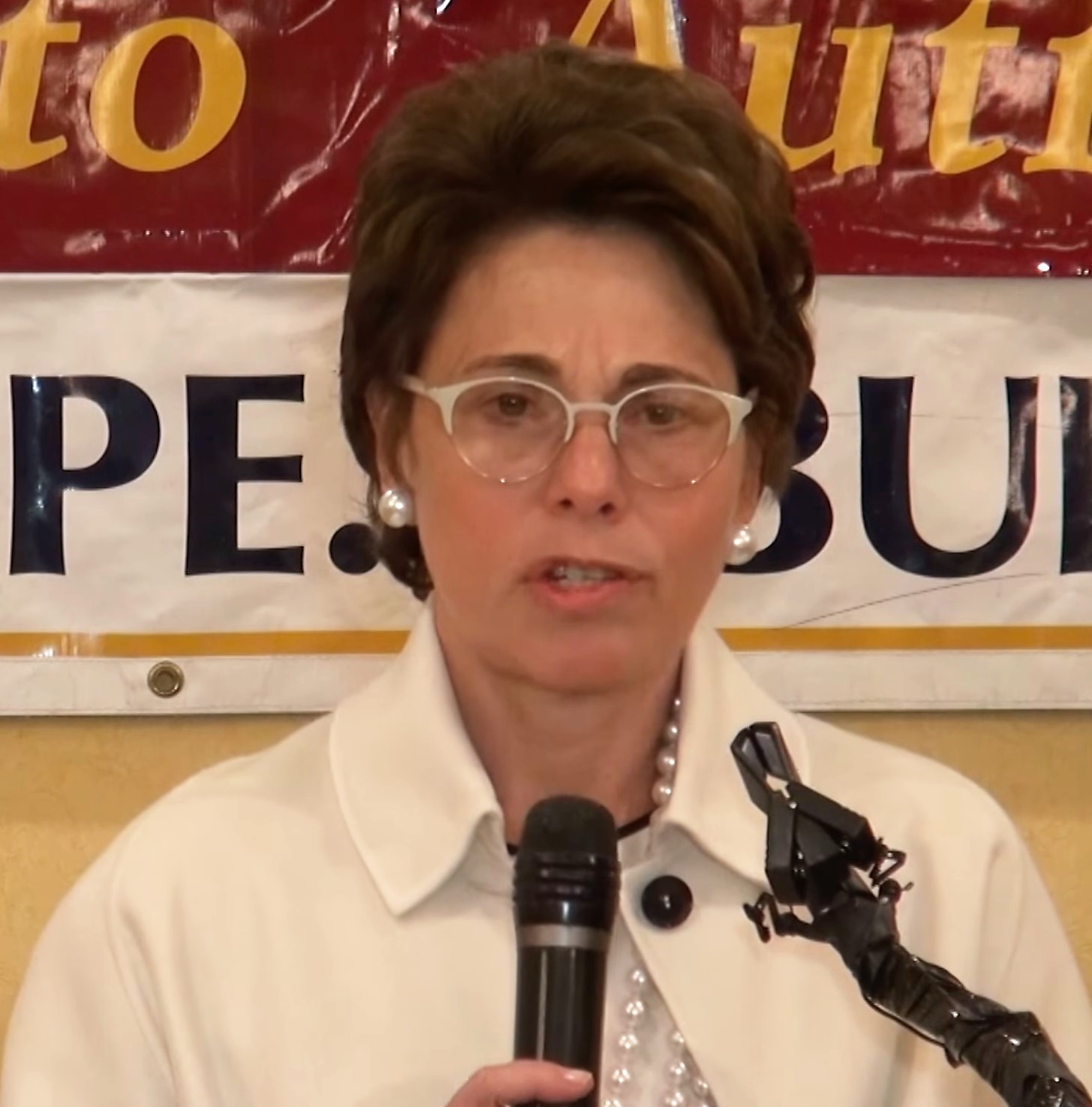
Merryl Tisch

== Art and architecture ==
- Charles Alston (MFA 1931), artist
- Aaron Douglas (MA 1944), painter, illustrator, and major figure in the Harlem Renaissance
- Maude Kerns (MA 1906), pioneering abstract artist and teacher
- Audrea Kreye (MA), metalsmith and jewelry designer
- Ryah Ludins (BS 1921), artist and art teacher
- Agnes Martin (BA 1942), artist
- Georgia O'Keeffe (1914), artist
- Raphael Montañez Ortiz (EdD 1982), artist and founder of El Museo del Barrio
- Frank Shifreen (2001), artist; curator; teacher
- Elaine Sturtevant (MA), artist
- Marius Sznajderman, painter, printmaker, and scenic designer
- Hilda Taba (PhD 1932), architect; curriculum theorist; curriculum reformer and teacher educator
- Alma Thomas (MA 1934), expressionist painter and art educator
- Lynd Ward (1926), illustrator and artist known for his series of wordless novels using wood engraving

== Academia ==
=== President ===
- Michael Apple (EdD 1970), professor of educational policy studies
- Louis T. Benezet (PhD 1942), former president of Claremont Graduate University
- Zhang Boling (1917), founder and president of National Nankai University
- Paul G. Bulger (EdD 1951), president of Buffalo State College
- Betty Castor (1963), president of the University of South Florida, member of the Florida Senate, and Florida education commissioner
- Margaret Mordecai Jones Cruikshank (1911), president of St. Mary's Junior College
- Bidhu Bhusan Das (MA 1947), university president/vice chancellor and ranking government official from India
- Marjorie Housepian Dobkin (MA), Barnard College professor and dean
- Edward C. Elliott (MA), educational researcher and president of Purdue University
- Claire Fagin (MA), first woman to serve as president of an Ivy League university
- Abraham S. Fischler (EdD 1959), academic; second president of Nova Southeastern University
- Edward Fitzpatrick (BS 1906, M.A. 1907, PhD 1911), president of Mount Mary College
- William Trufant Foster (PhD 1911), economist; first president of Reed College
- Susan Fuhrman (PhD 1977), first female president of TC; former UPenn dean
- Mildred García (EdD 1987), president of the American Association of State Colleges and Universities
- Gordon Gee (EdD 1972), president of Ohio State University
- Andy Holt (PhD 1937), president of University of Tennessee
- George Ivany (MA 1962), president of the University of Saskatchewan
- Dock J. Jordan (AB, 1925, M.A. 1928), president of Edward Waters University and Kittrell College
- J. Paul Leonard (1901–1995), university president, educator
- Morris Meister (PhD 1921), first president of Bronx Community College and first principal of Bronx High School of Science
- Jiang Menglin (PhD), president of Peking University; minister of education for the Republic of China
- Mary Eileen O'Brien (MA 1983), president of Dominican University New York
- Regina Peruggi (EdD 1984), president of Kingsborough Community College
- Thomas Granville Pullen Jr. (EdM.; EdD 1926), president University of Baltimore; Maryland state superintendent of education
- William Schuman (BS 1935, MA 1937), former president of the Juilliard School of Music and the Lincoln Center for the Performing Arts
- Floyd Wilcox (MA 1920), third president of Shimer College
- John Davis Williams (EdD 1940), chancellor of the University of Mississippi
- Sidney David Williams (MA 1930), president of Elizabeth City State Teachers College
- Lloyd P. Young (MA 1929, Ph.D. 1931), president of Keene State College

=== Faculty ===
- Randy E. Bennett (MA 1977, EdM 1978, EdD 1979), educational researcher
- Josephine Thorndike Berry (BS 1904, AM 1910), college professor and home economist
- John Seiler Brubacher (MA, PhD), educational philosopher; professor at Yale
- Edith Buchanan (EdD 1953), nursing educator, professor, and principal of the College of Nursing (now Rajkumari Amrit Kaur College of Nursing), New Delhi, India
- Arthur W. Chickering (PhD 1958), educational researcher in student development theory
- Satis N. Coleman (PhD 1931), music educator and professor at Teachers College, Columbia University
- Erick Gordon (EdM 1992), founding director of the Student Press Initiative at Teachers College, Columbia University
- Joan Dye Gussow (EdD 1975), professor emerita and former chair of the Nutrition Education Program at Teachers College, Columbia University
- Martin Haberman (EdD 1962), dean and distinguished professor at the University of Wisconsin–Milwaukee
- Margaret H'Doubler (1916), dance instructor who created the first dance major at the University of Wisconsin
- Martha Hill (BS 1929), first director of dance at the Juilliard School
- Percy Hughes (MA, PhD), leading figure in the Philosophy, Education, and Psychology Department at Lehigh University
- Seymour Itzkoff (PhD 1965), professor emeritus of education and child study at Smith College
- Yoshi Kasuya (MA 1930, PhD 1933), educator at Tsuda College in Kodaira, Tokyo
- William Heard Kilpatrick (PhD 1912), philosopher of education; professor at Teachers College, Columbia University
- Herbert Kliebard (EdD 1963), historian of education and professor at the University of Wisconsin–Madison
- Kuo Ping-Wen (MA 1912, PhD 1914), chancellor of the Shanghai College of Commerce
- Julius B. Maller (PhD 1929), professor and research sociologist
- John C. McAdams (MA), associate professor of political science at Marquette University
- Jane Ellen McAllister (PhD 1929), college professor and first African American woman to earn a PhD in education in the United States
- Lin Mosei (PhD 1929), dean of Arts at the National Taiwan University and the first Taiwanese to receive a PhD degree
- Jerome T. Murphy (MA), dean emeritus at the Harvard Graduate School of Education
- Thomas S. Popkewitz (MA 1964), professor of curriculum theory at the University of Wisconsin-Madison
- Louise M. Powell (BS 1922), nurse and educator who led the University of Minnesota School of Nursing during its formative years
- Robert Bruce Raup (PhD 1926), philosophy of education professor emeritus and critic of the American education system
- Betty Reardon (EdD 1985), founder and director of the Peace Education Center at Teachers College, Columbia University
- Agnes L. Rogers (PhD 1917), educational psychologist; professor of education
- Juanita Jane Saddler (MA 1935), dean of women at Fisk University
- Irma Salas Silva (PhD 1930), head of the Department of Education of the University of Chile's Faculty of Philosophy and Education
- Rawley Silver (EdD 1936), art therapist
- Lucy Diggs Slowe (MA 1915), first Black woman to serve as dean of women at an American University; one of the founders and first president of Alpha Kappa Alpha
- Samuel Totten (EdD 1985), genocide scholar and professor at the University of Arkansas, Fayetteville
- William E. Warner (PhD 1928), industrial arts professor at Ohio State University and founder of Epsilon Pi Tau honor society
- Joel Westheimer, professor of citizenship education at the University of Ottawa
- Marion Thompson Wright (PhD 1940), professor at Howard University and first African-American woman in the United States to earn Ph.D. in History

== Activism ==
- Thelma C. Davidson Adair (MA 1945, EdD 1959), advocate for human rights; peace; and justice
- Mary Antin (1902), immigration rights activist; author of The Promised Land
- Belle Moskowitz (attended in 1894), social activist
- Esther Peterson (MA 1930), consumer rights activist; 1981 Presidential Medal of Freedom recipient
- Anita Pollitzer (1913), suffragette and national chairman of the NWP
- Henrietta Rodman (1904), teacher; feminist activist
- Jill Sheffield (MA 1963), women's reproductive rights advocate
- Leon Sullivan (MA 1947), civil rights leader and social activist; 1991 Presidential Medal of Freedom recipient
- Ruth C. Sullivan (MA 1953), autism activist

== Business ==
- William Vincent Campbell Jr. (EdM 1974), board director for Apple Inc.; CEO for Claris; Intuit Inc. and GO Corporation
- Richard Robinson (attended, 1963), former CEO of Scholastic Corporation
- Carmen Rita Wong (MA 2000), personal finance expert

== Education ==
- Millie Almy (MA 1945, PhD 1948), psychologist and "Grandame of early childhood education"
- Florence E. Bamberger (PhD 1922), pedagogue; school supervisor; progressive education advocate
- Sarah Bavly (MS 1929, PhD 1947), Dutch-Israeli nutrition education pioneer in Israel
- June Dobbs Butts (EdD), educator, writer, and sex therapist
- Katherine M. Cook (MA 1912), chief, Division of Rural Education, Bureau of Education; chief, Division of Special Problems, Office of Education, HEW
- Frank W. Cyr (PhD 1930), educator and author known for his contribution to school busing
- Sarah Louise Delany (BA 1920, EdM 1925), first African-American permitted to teach high school science in New York
- Florence Dunlop (PhD 1935), pioneer in education for special-needs children
- Blanche General Ely (MA 1923), principal and founder of multiple schools in Broward County, Florida
- John D. Kendall (MA), promulgated the Suzuki method in the United States
- Deborah Kenny (PhD 1994), CEO of Harlem Village Academies
- H. S. S. Lawrence (MA; Ed.D. 1950), Indian educationist
- Daisy Nwachukwu (MA, MEd, EdD), Nigerian academic and theologian
- Caroline Pratt (BA 1894), progressive educator; founder of City and Country School in the Greenwich Village
- Tao Xingzhi (1917), Chinese educator and author of children's literature
- Katharine Whiteside Taylor (PhD 1937), educator and pioneer for the cooperative preschool movement.

== Entertainment ==
- Sara Benincasa (MA), comedian and author
- Donald Byrd (PhD 1982), jazz and fusion trumpet player; music educator
- Ennis Cosby (EdM 1995), murder victim and son of comedian Bill Cosby
- Arthur Cunningham (MA 1957), composer
- Patricia DiMango (MA), judge; star of CBS' Hot Bench
- William Patrick Foster (EdD 1955), bandmaster, composer, and author
- Agnes Moore Fryberger, educational director of the Minneapolis Symphony Orchestra and of the St. Louis Symphony Orchestra
- Art Garfunkel (MA 1967), singer, Rock and Roll Hall of Fame inductee; poet; actor
- Samuel E. Goldfarb, composer
- Ellie Krieger (MS 1994), nutritionist; host of Healthy Appetite with Ellie Krieger and Ellie's Real Good Food
- Eda LeShan (BS 1944), writer; television host; counselor; educator; playwright
- Mort Lindsey (MA 1948, Ed.D. 1974), orchestrator; composer; pianist; conductor; musical director
- Margaret McFarland (PhD 1938), child psychologist, chief consultant to Mister Rogers' Neighborhood
- Annie-B Parson (MA 1983), dancer, choreographer, founder of Big Dance Theater
- Soon-Yi Previn (EdM, 1998), wife of filmmaker Woody Allen
- David Randolph (MA 1942), conductor; music educator; radio host
- Helen Reichert (MA 1931), talk show personality; professor
- Marvin Rosen (EdM, EdD), pianist; educator; musicologist; Classical Discoveries radio host
- Angela Santomero (MA), television executive producer and creator
- Morton Schindel (MA 1947), educator and film producer
- Robert Sherman (MA 1953), radio broadcaster; author; educator
- Karl Struss (BA 1912), photographer and cinematographer; pioneer in 3D films
- Bobby Susser (MA 1987), children's songwriter; record producer; performer
- Ellen R. Thompson (MA), composer and music educator
- Marion Verhaalen (EdD, 1971), composer and musicologist
- Ruth Westheimer (EdD, 1970), sex therapist known as "Dr. Ruth", talk show host, author, professor

== Literature and journalism ==
- Pam Allyn (MA 1988), literacy expert
- Carolyn Sherwin Bailey (1896), author of Miss Hickory; winner of the 1947 Newbery Medal
- Norman Cousins (BA), editor, peace activist
- Ella Cara Deloria (BS 1915), novelist and Yankton Sioux ethnologist
- Rudolf Flesch (PhD 1955), author who inspired Dr. Seuss to write The Cat in the Hat
- Neil Postman (MA 1955, EdD 1958), author and cultural critic
- Miriam Roth (EdM), Israeli writer and scholar of children's books; educator
- Tao Xingzhi (1917), Chinese educator and author of children's literature
- Grace Steele Woodward, writer and historian
- Anzia Yezierska (1905), novelist

== Medicine and psychology ==
- Louie Croft Boyd (1909), nurse and hospital superintendent of nurses
- Augusta Fox Bronner (BS 1906, MA 1909, PhD 1914), psychologist and co-director of the first child guidance clinic
- May Edward Chinn (BS 1921), first Black woman to graduate from Bellevue Hospital Medical College
- Peter T. Coleman (PhD), psychologist; executive director of the Morton Deutsch ICCCR and the AC4
- Diane DiResta (MS 1977), media trainer; speech coach; certified speech pathologist
- Patricia Lynne Duffy (MA 1981), synesthesia expert
- Albert Ellis (MA 1943, PhD 1947), cognitive behavioral therapist
- Haim Ginott, child psychologist and psychotherapist, and parent educator
- Edmund Gordon (EdD), psychologist
- Tsuruko Haraguchi (PhD 1912), psychologist
- Virginia Henderson (BS 1932, MA 1934), nurse; researcher; theorist; the "first lady of nursing"
- Lois Holzman (PhD 1977), psychologist, director, and co-founder of the East Side Institute
- David W. Johnson (EdD 1966), social psychologist
- Imogene King (EdD), pioneer of nursing theory development
- Eleanor C. Lambertsen (BS 1949, MA 1950, EdD 1957), revolutionized nursing and health care organization and delivery
- Harriet Lerner (MA), clinical psychologist
- Ruth Lubic (BS 1959, MA 1961, EdD 1979), leader of the nurse-midwifery movement in the US
- Rollo May (PhD 1949), existential psychologist
- Margaret McFarland (PhD 1938), child psychologist, chief consultant to Mister Rogers' Neighborhood
- Hildegard Peplau (MA, PhD), nurse and nurse theorist who led the way toward the humane treatment of patients with behavior and personality disorders
- June Reinisch (MA 1970, PhD 1976), psychologist and director of the Kinsey Institute
- Carl Rogers (MA 1928, PhD 1931), psychologist
- Martha E. Rogers (MA 1945), nursing theorist; creator of the Science of Unitary Human Beings
- Celestine Smith (EdD 1952), first Black woman to become certified as a Jungian psychoanalyst, in 1964
- Ian K. Smith (MA 1993), physician and author
- Edward Thorndike (PhD 1898), psychologist
- Robert L. Thorndike (MA 1932, PhD 1935), psychologist
- Wang Xiuying (MA 1936), Chinese nurse, educator, and public health advocate
- Darlene Yee-Melichar (MS 1984, EdD 1985), gerontologist
- Shirley Zussman (1937), sex therapist

== Military ==
- Anna Mae Hays (BS 1958), first woman in the U.S. Armed Forces to be promoted to general officer rank
- Olivia Hooker (MA 1947), first African-American woman to serve in the U.S. Coast Guard
- Hazel Johnson-Brown (MA 1963), first female African-American general in the United States Army

== Politics and government ==
- Muhammad Fadhel al-Jamali (MA 1930, PhD 1934), prime minister of Iraq
- Hafizullah Amin (MA), president of Afghanistan
- Nahas Gideon Angula (MA 1978, EdM 1979), Prime Minister of Namibia
- William Ayers (EdM; EdD 1987), founder of Weather Underground; professor of education
- C. Louise Boehringer (BS 1911), first woman to be elected to office in Arizona
- Peter L. Buttenwieser (PhD), Democratic donor and fundraiser
- Betty Castor (1963), Florida Senate, Florida education commissioner, and president of the University of South Florida
- P. C. Chang (PhD), philosopher and diplomat
- Shirley Chisholm (MA. 1952), first African American woman elected to Congress and former US presidential candidate
- Betsy Gotbaum (MA 1967), public advocate for New York City
- Hu Shih (PhD 1917), Chinese diplomat
- Lee Huan (MA), premier of the Republic of China
- Kevin Jennings (MA 1994), former assistant deputy secretary at the U.S. Department of Education
- Thomas Kean (MA 1963), former governor of New Jersey
- John King Jr. (EdM; EdD 2008), 10th United States secretary of education, 15th chancellor of the State University of New York
- Guillermo Linares (EdD), first Dominican elected to public office in the US
- Olga A. Mendez (MA 1960), first Puerto Rican woman elected to a US state legislature
- Jiang Menglin (PhD), president of Peking University; minister of education for the Republic of China
- Chester Earl Merrow (1937), educator; U.S. representative from New Hampshire
- Yvonne B. Miller (MA 1962), first African-American woman to be elected to the Virginia state house
- Richard P. Mills (EdD 1977), former commissioner of education for Vermont and New York
- Diane Ravitch (PhD 1975), historian of education; former U.S. Assistant secretary of education
- Tian-Ming Sheu (EdD 1993), president of the National Academy for Educational Research in Taiwan
- Merryl Tisch (EdD), chancellor of the New York State Board of Regents, presiding over University of the State of New York and the New York State Education Department
- Deborah Wolfe (MS 1938, EdD 1945), education chief of the US House of Representatives Committee on Education and Labor

== Religion ==
- Barnett R. Brickner (MA), rabbi
- Carl Henry Clerk (1926), fourth synod clerk of the Presbyterian Church of the Gold Coast
- Minnie Vautrin (MA 1919), educator and missionary
- Moshe Weinberger, rabbi and author

== Science ==
- George Albert Llano (MA 1939), polar explorer and lichenologist with the National Academy of Sciences

== Sports ==
- Clarence Gaines (MA 1950), hall of fame basketball coach of Winston-Salem State University
- Maya Lawrence (MA 2010), Olympic fencer
- Sid Luckman, quarterback in the Pro Football Hall of Fame
- Adolph Rupp (MA), hall of fame basketball coach of the University of Kentucky
- Henry Wittenberg (MA), Olympic wrestling champion
