= Deborah Kenny =

American educator

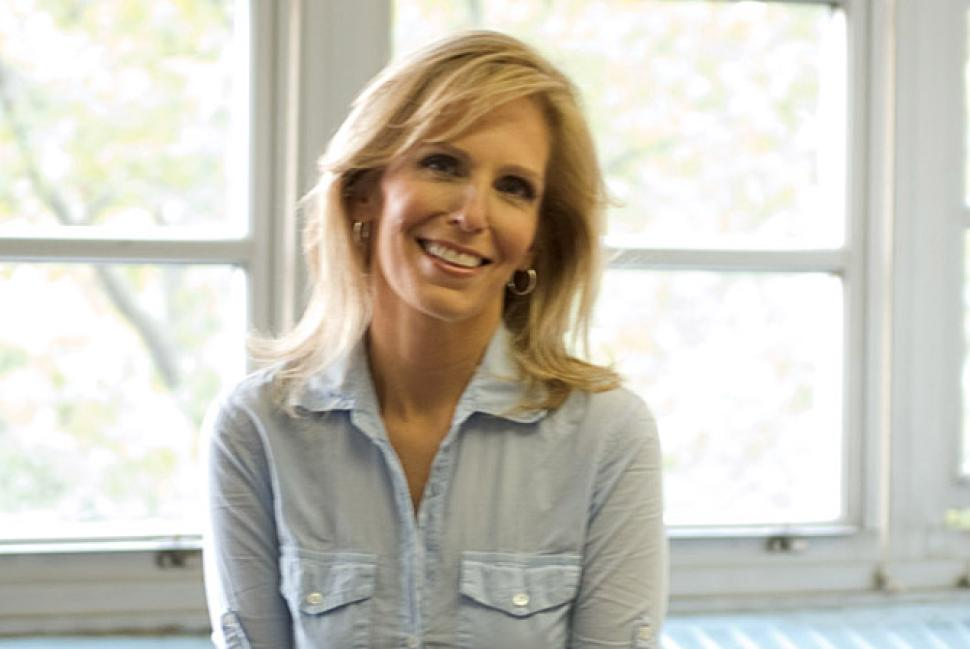
- Kenny in 2012
- Education: University of Pennsylvania; Teachers College, Columbia University
- Occupations: Founder and CEO of the Harlem Village Academies; Author of The Well-Educated Child and Born to Rise

Deborah Kenny is an American educator, author of The Well-Educated Child and Born to Rise. Kenny is the founder and Chief Executive of Harlem Village Academies, a network of charter schools in Harlem, New York, and founder of the Deeper Learning Institute, a graduate school and learning lab embedded in the HVA campus. Kenny has advocated for the importance of deeper learning in PreK-12 education, including performance assessment, student agency, restorative discipline, and intrinsic motivation.

== Background ==
Kenny started the Harlem Village Academies charter schools shortly after her husband died of leukemia in 2001 as the founding principal of the flagship Harlem Village Academy. Previously, Kenny served as Group President of Sesame Street Publishing, and as Vice President of Marketing and Business Development of Time Warner's Parenting Group, where she designed educational guides for expectant and new mothers. She is a former classroom teacher with experience in youth leadership training and curriculum development.

== Education ==
Kenny holds a Ph.D. and M.A. from Teachers College, Columbia University in comparative international education, and a B.A. magna cum laude from the University of Pennsylvania.

== Work with Harlem Village Academies ==
=== Overview ===
Kenny is founder and Chief Executive Officer of Harlem Village Academies (HVA), a network of five charter schools based in Harlem: two elementary schools, two middle schools, and one high school, and the Deeper Learning Institute (DLI). HVA is the only group of charter schools in New York State offering the Montessori program as well as the International Baccalaureate (IB) for all students.

=== History ===
In 2002, the Harlem Village Academies charters were submitted and subsequently approved by the Charter Schools Institute of the State University of New York. In its early years HVA partnered with a local community based organization, the East Harlem Council for Community Improvement (EHCCI).

In 2003, the first HVA was opened as a middle school in Harlem with Dr. Kenny serving as founding principal. The first class of students entered the school in 5^{th} grade. In 2005, the second HVA middle school was opened. The two middle schools are called HVA West Elementary and HVA East Elementary.

In August 2007, HVA opened its third school: a high school called HVA High. The high school was initially located inside the EHCCI community center, and eventually developed a new school facility built through a public-private partnership. In 2009, with 400 students on the wait list for its middle schools, Mayor Michael Bloomberg called HVA “the poster child for this country” and a model of President Obama’s educational aspirations.

In 2012, HVA opened its fourth and fifth schools: the two HVA elementary schools. The first class of elementary students entered in kindergarten. These schools are known as HVA East Elementary and HVA West Elementary.

In 2016, consistent with Kenny’s vision of deeper learning, HVA began offering the International Baccalaureate (IB), and in 2020 shifted to “IB for All” in which all students are engaged in a rigorous course of study. In 2020, as part of Kenny’s expansion of the organization’s focus on deeper learning at all grade levels, Kenny conceived of the idea of opening a PreK based on the Montessori method. The first HVA Montessori PreK program opened in 2021.

=== Organization ===
Kenny has been the academic leader of HVA since founding the schools. She has written a landmark book about K-12 education, The Well-Educated Child, based on her decades of educational experience.

Kenny is a proponent of respecting teachers. She has said, "The respect for teachers has declined and that is not ok. As a nation we have to respect teachers more. Give the teachers a chance to be their best. You have to treat them as professionals."

== Work with Deeper Learning Institute ==
In 2013, Kenny founded the Deeper Learning Institute to offer NY State initial certification in childhood grades 1–6 and students with disabilities, as well as a master’s degree in childhood and special education. The Deeper Learning Institute trains teachers to instruct children in developing critical thinking skills. Graduate students complete their training through immersion programs in K-12 classrooms located on the campus.

== Educational philosophy ==
=== General ===
Kenny’s educational philosophy was informed by the Quaker schooling tradition that seeks to “nurture a person rooted as much in the unseen as in the seen” and by the conviction that all children deserve an education of the finest caliber. The founding document of HVA, its charter application, described a vision for schools that foster student agency, intellectual engagement, and intrinsic motivation.

Kenny is supportive of Martin Haberman’s denunciation of the pedagogy of poverty: “overly directive, mind-numbing, mundane, anti-intellectual acts” such as isolated drills, rote learning, worksheets, and presentations that make minimal cognitive demands. Her philosophy of deeper learning centers on ideas such as: intrinsic motivation, performance assessment, restorative discipline, student self-direction, application of knowledge, culturally responsive teaching, mindfulness, compelling curriculum, and independent thinking.

Her strategy for how to achieve this vision was presented in a Wall Street Journal article in 2010 called "A Teacher Quality Manifesto" in which she discusses workplace culture and how it impacts public education. In this, Kenny sets out her approach to creating workplace culture. She describes three components of culture: ownership, teamwork and learning that have been the key to elevating teacher quality at her schools, and she believes the only way to fundamentally change public education is to build a culture in schools that attracts talent, brings out passion and holds teachers accountable for results. She has spoken out against an overemphasis on teacher evaluation. Kenny is a proponent of the charter model and has said in order to promote education reform we need to "charterize" the country.

Kenny wrote the book Born to Rise about her life and the founding of the schools. Over a period of eight years, Kenny also wrote The Well-Educated Child, a book that describes her vision for an optimal K-12 education and explains what children need to thrive and excel.

=== Montessori ===
In order to implement her deeper learning vision from a younger age, in 2020 Kenny started a PreK Montessori school in Harlem, a program informed by the Montessori method—an approach to curriculum that fosters student independence, concentration, persistence, and intellectual curiosity, and teaches responsibility and courtesy.

=== International Baccalaureate (IB) ===
Since the Regents exams and AP exams were not aligned with her pedagogical vision, Kenny determined that HVA would be an International Baccalaureate school. The International Baccalaureate (IB) is a program which focuses on deeper learning, including performance assessment, in-depth research projects, and an emphasis on extended essays and oral exams. This program aligns with Kenny's vision of each student becoming intellectually sophisticated, wholesome in character, an avid reader, an independent thinker, and a compassionate individual who graduates from college and makes a meaningful contribution to society.

== Writing ==
Kenny wrote the book Born to Rise published in 2012, about her life and the founding of the schools in Harlem. The title of the book was inspired by the HVA school song, “We Rise,” written by John Legend. Over a period of eight years, Kenny wrote The Well-Educated Child (2026) a book that describes her vision for an optimal K-12 education and explains what children need to thrive and excel.

In The Well-Educated Child, Dr. Deborah Kenny offers a vision for education that cultivates intelligent, happy, morally grounded young people. David Adams, the CEO of Urban Assembly, said: “Deborah Kenny's book stopped me in my tracks. Her humility and passion for excellence literally jump off the page. It is a beautiful book filled with wisdom and depth. I'm a better person for having read it." She has authored op-eds for The New York Times, the Washington Post, the Wall Street Journal, and more.

== Awards, speaking, and media ==
Kenny was selected and profiled by Bill Cosby in Oprah Winfrey's "O" 2010 power list. She was also featured in Esquire's annual Best & Brightest. She was honored as "Educator of the Year" at a presentation by New York City Schools Chancellor Joel Klein, and received the national "Educators who Perform" award at the Center for Education Reform gala in Washington, DC gala in Washington, DC. In addition, Kenny was honored with the Distinguished Alumni award from Columbia University Teachers College.

Kenny is a frequent guest on Morning Joe with Joe Scarborough. She has appeared on NBC Nightly News, CBS Evening News, the TODAY show, Fox & Friends, and CBS This Morning.

She has been a keynote speaker at national education conferences, and a featured speaker at universities such as the Harvard Graduate School of Education and the Yale School of Management, as well as at leadership gatherings including at the Allen and Company Sun Valley Conference.

== Criticism ==
According to the Daily News, "An unusually high number of younger students either drop out or are held back. In school year 2003-04, the year the school opened, only 48 of 73 fifth graders made it to sixth grade. In school year 2006-07, 46 of 68 moved on; in 2007-08, just 40 of 76 fifth graders made it to sixth grade." However, most recent publicly available data shows that Kenny's schools are now a model for exemplary student attrition with only 12% from 2009-10 to 2010-11, compared to a 22% average for traditional public schools in Harlem (District 5).

The New York City Department of Education reported that in 2011, 100% of students at HVA Middle school passed the eighth grade math test. While some columnists criticize the fact that the cohort started out with 75 students, and only 44 students took the test, this is consistent with the average student attrition of the school district.

The issue of teacher attrition has been debated, with some pointing to exemplary teacher satisfaction and others claiming high rates. In a Huffington Post blog, Leonie Haimson wrote that "...Harlem Village Academy has some of the highest teacher turnover rates in the city, according to the NY State report cards. One of her charters had annual attrition rates of 60% and 53%, for the two most recent years for which data is available; the other had teacher attrition rates of 71% and 42%." The reason for the inconsistency, according to the New York Charter Center, is that the data do not capture many key factors including how many teachers "left the classroom because they were promoted within the same charter school or network."

In 2008, Kenny was among the highest paid education executives in New York State. Her salary of $442,807 was second only to Geoff Canada, CEO of Harlem Children's Zone. According to Edward Lewis, HVA Board chair, founder of Essence Communications, Kenny's salary comes entirely from privately raised funds. It is not funded by government revenue. By 2018, Kenny's salary had risen to $619,463 according to Harlem Village Academies' tax return filed with the Internal Revenue Service.

== Personal life ==
Kenny's mother was a homemaker and freelance writer; her father was a teacher, editor, and copy editor before becoming a stock broker. Kenny's mother attended school in France and took the Baccalaureate exam in Strasbourg.

Kenny was widowed at age 38. She is the mother of three grown children and lives in New York City.
