= Richard Alton Graham =

American equal rights leader

Richard Alton Graham (November 6, 1920 – September 24, 2007) was an American equal rights leader, one of the inaugural group of five members of the United States Equal Employment Opportunity Commission (EEOC). He was the founding director of the National Teachers Corps. He was also one of the founders of the National Organization for Women (NOW), becoming one of its initial officers.

== Early life ==
Graham was born in Chicago, Illinois; but he was raised in Lima, Ohio and Milwaukee, Wisconsin. During World War II, he served in the Army Air Forces in Iran. After the war, he worked with his father developing a variable speed drive transmission for electric motors. Father and son ran a small manufacturing business in Minominnee, Minnesota, until the younger Graham embarked on a career of public service.

=== Educational background ===
Graham was awarded a bachelor's degree in engineering from Cornell University in 1942. He earned a master's degree in education from Catholic University in 1970; and he continued his studies, earning a Ph.D. in philosophy in 1972 from what was then the "Union Graduate School", now the Union Institute and University in Cincinnati, Ohio.

== Public service ==
In 1961, Graham became the deputy of Sargent Shriver, the first director of the Peace Corps; and then he left Washington to serve as the Peace Corps country director in Tunisia (1963–1965).

In 1965, President Lyndon Johnson named Graham as one of the first Commissioners of the Equal Employment Opportunity Commission. He was readily confirmed by Congress. He was a registered Republican in 1965—he later changed party affiliation—and he was named to EEOC to add political balance. Among other activities, he was prominent in promoting the EEOC guidelines, including those prohibiting discrimination on the basis of gender. He would later say he "learned on the job" to become a feminist; and soon became one of the more outspoken commissioners along with the only female member, Aileen Hernandez, a future NOW founder and president.

He was the founding vice president of the National Organization for Women when it was first organized in 1966. He was a male supporter of women's rights at a time when such public support was less common; and, according to the 2007 NOW President Kim Gandy, Graham's decision to become a leader of the organization in its infancy gave NOW a certain level of credibility. In 1966, he was sworn in as the first director of the National Teachers Corps, with an underfunded initial budget of $7.5 million for 1,250 teachers in 125 schools. This meant that from the outset, Graham's top priority became lobbying Congress for additional appropriations to bridge the gap between the program's funding and its projected per capita costs of $8,100 per teacher. By 1968, the Teacher Corps had expanded into 200 schools; and the program had earned modest bi-partisan support. Graham continued to head the Teacher Corps in the early years of the Nixon administration until early 1971.

In the mid-1970s, he became director of the Center for Moral Education at the Harvard Graduate School of Education. He served as President of Goddard College in Plainfield, Vermont (1975–1976); and he helped found the Goddard-Cambridge Center for Social Change.

From the mid-1980s until his death, Graham was an adviser to the Council for Research in Values and Philosophy in Washington, D.C.

Dick Graham married Nancy Aring Graham on December 21, 1949, and enjoyed 57 years of marriage until his death in 2007. Together they raised five children: Peggy Sue (Busy), Charles Louis (Hoey), Richard (Dicker), Nan and John.
