= Haimson =

Haimson is a surname. Notable people with the surname include:

- Leonie Haimson, American educational advocate
- Leopold H. Haimson (1927–2010), American historian

== See also ==
- George Haimsohn (1925–2003), American writer and photographer
