= Sarah Bavly =

Dutch–Israel nutritionist, educator, researcher and author

Dr. Sarah Bavly
- שרה בבלי
- Born: October 18, 1900; Amsterdam, Netherlands
- Died: 1993 (age 92–93); Jerusalem, Israel
- Other names: Sara Bavli
- Education: M.S., chemistry, University of Amsterdam; M.S., Columbia University Teachers College, 1929; PhD, nutrition, Columbia University Teachers College, 1947
- Spouse: Dr. Yehuda Meir Bromberg
- Children: 2
- Scientific career
- Fields: Nutrition, chemistry
- Institutions: Hadassah Medical Center; College of Nutrition and Home Economics
- Thesis: Family Food Consumption in Palestine: A comparison of consumption by the Jewish urban population in 1943 and in 1946, and a study of methods conducive to improvement of food selection (1948)

Sarah Bavly (Hebrew: שרה בבלי, also spelled Sara Bavli) (October 18, 1900 – 1993) was a Dutch–Israeli nutritionist, educator, researcher, and author. Having immigrated from the Netherlands to British Mandatory Palestine in 1926, she became the chief dietitian for Hadassah hospitals and head of Hadassah's school lunch program. Her 1939 book Tzunatenu (Our Nutrition) was a standard elementary-school textbook for nearly 30 years. She founded and directed the Institute of Nutrition Education in 1952 and was founder and dean of the College of Nutrition and Home Economics in Jerusalem from 1953 to 1965. After her retirement, she continued to engage in research and conducted periodic nutrition surveys for the Israel Central Bureau of Statistics.

== Early life and education ==
Sarah Bavly was born in Amsterdam to Nathan and Lina-Leah Bavly. She was the youngest of five children in a religious Jewish family. She and her siblings all belonged to the Zionist youth movement, and all made aliyah to Palestine between 1919 and 1926.

Sarah received her M.S. in chemistry at the University of Amsterdam in 1925. On the recommendation of a friend who had already made aliyah, she spent the following year acquiring specialized training in nutrition and economics in order to bring useful work skills to Palestine.

== Career ==
Her first position in Palestine was as a teacher of nutrition and chemistry at a WIZO school in Nahalal, where she taught young women in their twenties. In April 1927 she left the moshav for a position as dietitian at the Hadassah hospital in Tel Aviv. Shortly afterward, she was engaged as a teacher of nutrition and dietetics at the Hadassah Nursing School in Jerusalem, becoming the first educator in the country to teach these subjects.

In 1928 she was offered the position of chief dietitian for all five Hadassah hospitals in Jerusalem, Tel Aviv, Haifa, Safed, and Tiberias, including the set-up and managing of dietary departments at each location. Before assuming this post, she was sent abroad by the Hadassah directorship for a study year abroad. She interned briefly at the Montefiore Medical Center in New York and then enrolled at Columbia University Teachers College, where she completed her M.S. in one year. In addition, she gained practical experience in school lunch programs with a one-month stint at a diet clinic in Boston.

Bavly returned to Palestine in August 1929. In addition to her new role as chief dietitian for Hadassah hospitals, she was asked to open a nutrition department at the recently constructed Nathan Straus Health Center in Jerusalem. However, the 1929 Palestine riots broke out at this time and she and other residents were forced to take shelter in the Straus Center for a week. In this and other emergency situations over the coming two decades, Bavly's department supervised and provided food for immigrants and for paramilitary and military forces.

In 1930 she was named director of the Hadassah school lunch program, which furnished 1,000 children in eight schools and 12 kindergartens with a daily meal. (Note: By 1948 this program was serving 28,000 children in 300 schools.) She also supervised nutrition education programs for the public. She and other Hadassah educators called for the creation of a "national diet" by combining locally available food sources with nutrition science. She encouraged immigrants to leave behind the eating habits of their native countries and add locally-grown foodstuffs to their diets, saying, "The new immigrant must not only learn, he must also forget". In 1939 she published the book Tzunatenu (Our Nutrition), which became a standard elementary school textbook for nearly 30 years. Raviv notes that the book had outdated itself by the 1960s since it promoted the foodstuffs used primarily by European immigrants to pre-state Israel, without mentioning the foods and spices used by Jews from Arab lands who immigrated en masse after the founding of the state.

Foreseeing the need to develop formal training programs and courses for dietitians and nutritionists in the Hadassah system after the establishment of the State of Israel, Bavly asked for and received a scholarship to return to Columbia University in 1946. She earned her PhD in nutrition in August 1947. Her doctoral thesis, "Family Food Consumption in Palestine", was reprinted in 1972 by AMS Press.

In 1950 she founded and served as director of the Institute of Nutrition Education, a research institute underwritten by Hadassah. Hadassah transferred the Institute to the State of Israel in 1952.

In the 1950s the Ministry of Education and Culture took over the management of the Hadassah school lunch program and home economics courses, with Bavly serving as head of the Ministry's Nutrition Department. In 1953, under the Ministry's auspices, Bavly helped found the College of Nutrition and Home Economics in Jerusalem, a teacher training college for nutritionists who would work in hospitals, clinics, schools, and retirement homes. She became the college's full-time dean in 1960. In 1959 the college was noted for conducting a national survey on nutrition among immigrant families in conjunction with UNICEF and the World Health Organization. Under Bavly's direction, senior students interviewed 800 immigrant families on the subject of dietary habits, illness, and infant mortality. The College operated independently until 1981.

Bavly retired from the College of Nutrition and Home Economics in 1965. She continued to engage in research and conducted periodic nutrition surveys for the Israel Central Bureau of Statistics. She made pottery as a hobby and was recognized for her artistic talent by the Jerusalem House of Design. In 1984 the Jerusalem Municipality named her an honorary Citizen of Jerusalem.

== Other activities ==
Bavly served on several government commissions, including those concerning poverty and the teaching of home economics. She was a frequent speaker at international meetings and congresses.

== Personal life ==
Bavly married Dr. Yehuda Meir Bromberg (1902–1943), accountant-general of Hadassah, in April 1930. Bromberg later became assistant director-general of the Hadassah Medical Organization in Palestine. The couple had one son and one daughter.

She died in 1993. Her papers are stored in File A520 at the Central Zionist Archives in Jerusalem.

== Selected publications ==
- Kligler, J.; Geiger, A.; Bromberg-Bavly, S.; Gurevich, D. (1931). An Inquiry into the Diets of Various Sections of the Urban and Rural Population of Palestine. The Palestine Economic Society.
- Bavly, Sarah (1943), "Nutritional Inquiry", in Bachi, Roberto (ed.), Inquiry into Poverty and Malnutrition among the Jews of Jerusalem: Appendices on Glossotis and Tuberculosis, Hadassah Emergency Committee
- Bavly, Sarah (1952). רמת התזונה בישראל, 1951 [Level of Nutrition in Israel, 1951] (in Hebrew). Israel Central Bureau of Statistics.
- Bavly, Sarah (1960). "Food Consumption and Levels of Nutrition of Urban Wage and Salary Earners' Families in Israel 1956–1957". Israel Central Bureau of Statistics.
- Cohen, A.M.; Bavly, Sarah; Poznansky, Rachel (23 December 1961). "Change of Diet of Yemenite Jews in Relation to Diabetes and Ischaemic Heart-Disease". The Lancet. 2 (7217): 1399–401. doi:10.1016/S0140-6736(61)91215-6. PMID 13880218.
- Bavly, Sarah; Mundel, G.; Gugenheim, K.; Halevi, H.S. (1962). Survey of Food Consumption and Nutritional Status Among the Rural Population in Israel, 1959–1960. Ministry of Health.
- Bavly, Sarah (1966). Levels of Nutrition in Israel 1963–1964: Urban Wage and Salary Earners. Jerusalem Post Press.
- Bavly, Sarah (1964). Food Habits and their Changes in Israel. Ministry of Education and Culture.
- Bavly, Sarah (1966). Nutritional Patterns Among 7 Rural Communities in Israel, 1963. Ministry of Education and Culture.
- Bavly, Sarah (1969). Evaluation of Nutrition Education Programmes in Israel. Ministry of Education and Culture.
- Bavly, Sarah (1972). Levels of Nutrition in Israel, 1968–1969. Israel Central Bureau of Statistics.
- Bavly, Sarah (1973). "Food Intake of Yemenite and Kurdish Jews in Israel". Philosophical Transactions of the Royal Society B. 266 (876): 121–126. Bibcode:1973RSPTB.266..121B. doi:10.1098/rstb.1973.0041. PMID 4148282.
- Bavly, Sarah (1974). "Nutritional Patterns of Rural Yemenite and Kurdish Jews in Israel". Ministry of Education and Culture.
- Bavly, Sarah; Poznanski, Rachel; Kaufmann, Nathan (1980). Levels of Nutrition in Israel.

== Sources ==
- Levin, Marlin; Kustanowitz, Esther (2002). It Takes a Dream: The Story of Hadassah. Gefen Publishing House. ISBN 978-9652293008.
- Raviv, Yael (2015). Falafel Nation: Cuisine and the making of national identity in Israel. University of Nebraska Press. ISBN 978-0803290211.
- Tene, Ofra (2015), "'The New Immigrant Must Not Only Learn, He Must Also Forget': The making of Eretz Israeli Ashkenzi Cuisine", in Helman, Anat (ed.), Jews and Their Foodways, Oxford University Press, ISBN 978-0190265434
