= Pam Allyn =

American literacy expert and author

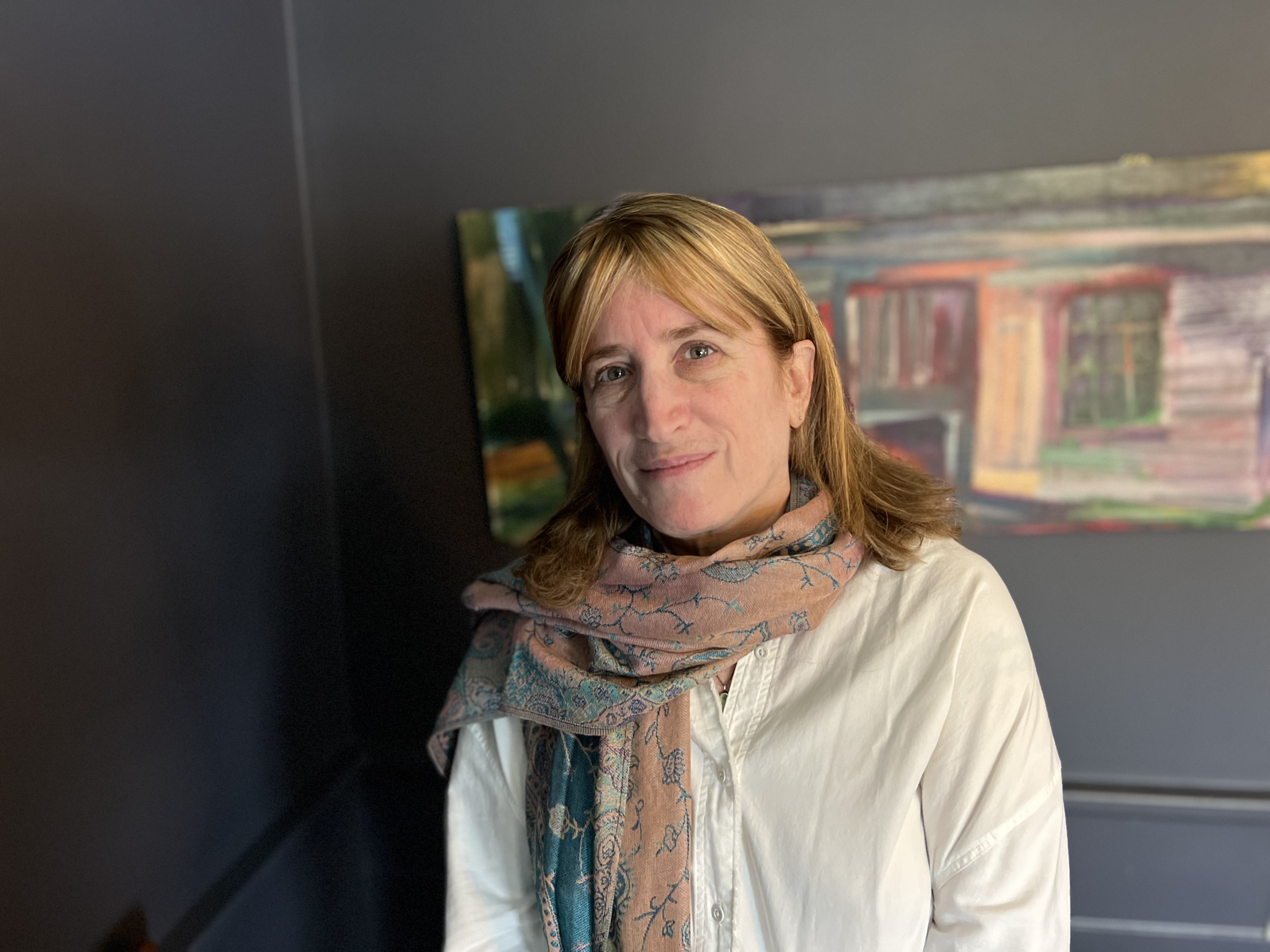
- Education: Amherst College (BA); Teachers College, Columbia University (MA)
- Occupations: Author; Literacy Expert
- Spouse: Jim Allyn (m. 1988)
- Writing career
- Period: 1984 – present
- Website: pamallyn.com

Pam Allyn is an American literacy expert and author. She is the founder and CEO of Dewey, a learning program and platform for parents and carers to support their children. Allyn founded LitWorld, a global literacy initiative, and LitLife, a consulting group working with schools to improve the teaching of reading and writing. She has worked as a social impact and education strategist.

Allyn is the author of 27 books and over 100 book chapters and articles on children’s literary advocacy, childhood development, and educational trends. Her work has been featured on Good Morning America, The Today Show, Oprah Radio, The Huffington Post, CNN International, and in The New York Times, among others.

Allyn was previously a spokesperson for BIC Kids, championing BIC's 2014 "Fight For Your Write" campaign.

== Career ==
Allyn pursued her Master’s in Deaf Education from Teachers College, Columbia University, graduating in 1988. Allyn continued to teach in the New York City Public Schools system and served as the Director of Funded Projects for The Teachers College Reading and Writing Project for nearly a decade after graduation, where she worked alongside NYC schoolteachers as a coach and literacy leader.

After Allyn left Teachers College, she set up the program Books for Boys in 1999 at The Children's Village, a residential treatment center for foster care children. Allyn said in a 2003 interview that she wanted the boys at The Children’s Village “to know that whatever experience they’re having, they can read about it. They can find a book that relates to that experience; they can write their own stories about it. Anything can become an opportunity to create or find a good story.” As of 2023, the program is open to all genders and is called Open Door. The program has been praised for its work with at-risk youth and has been replicated in other foster care agencies. Allyn founded LitLife in 2002 with her husband, Jim Allyn, and it now operates across 13 states and 18 countries.

== International advocacy and LitWorld ==
Allyn set up LitWorld in 2007: a non-profit focused on cultivating global literacy leaders through transformational literacy experiences. The organization develops adaptable programs that promote leadership and strengthen children and their communities. In a 2013 interview with News 4 New York, Allyn said, “We started LitWorld in the spirit that all children deserve the right to read and write, no matter where they live, no matter where they’ve come from or are going to; everybody can use literacy for their own dreams…it’s one of those causes that everybody can belong to.”

LitWorld's LitClub and LitCamp programs, which run during the school year and out-of-school times, aim to empower emerging leaders, storytellers, and academic achievers. The program’s success led to the development of the 7 Strengths Framework, which became the basis for LitWorld’s activities.

In 2010, Allyn and LitWorld established World Read Aloud Day (WRAD), an advocacy day focusing on the right to read and write. The idea came from a LitClub child who asked his teacher, “Why can’t we create a birthday party for the read-aloud?” LitWorld launched the program in partnership with Scholastic, with Allyn stating that “the best, most successful initiatives in education happen when we listen to the voices of children.” The event is hosted on the first Wednesday of February, with live celebrations, virtual read-alouds, book lists, at-home activities, and read-a-thons with readers reporting worldwide. World Read Aloud Day is celebrated by over 90 million people in 170 countries and 50 states. Allyn remained part of the LitWorld team as executive director until 2017. As of 2020, LitWorld has reached over 1.12 million children across more than 30 countries worldwide.

== Women and girls' advocacy ==
Allyn and the LitWorld team created a Girls LitClub Initiative in Kisumu, Kenya, in the summer of 2011, with over 100 girls in attendance at the first Girls LitClub meeting. LitClubs specific to girls were launched in Ghana, Nepal, Uganda, and India, aiming to build community, friendships, and tools for innovation. Allyn described the importance of the clubs as “life and death work.”.

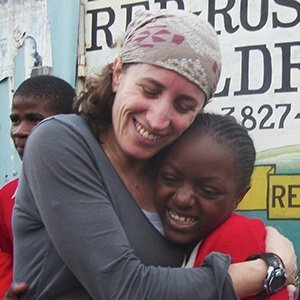
Allyn with a LitClub student in Kisumu, Kenya in 2011

She wrote “The girls in LitWorld’s LitClubs read and write to find out who they are, to see that stories can inspire them, and make them feel less alone. They can read and write to look out at the world, to imagine it as a possibility for themselves and for their families. Through these programs, the world becomes a hopeful place.”

In response to the United Nations General Assembly’s adoption of Resolution 66/170, Allyn and LitWorld launched Stand Up for Girls in 2012, a worldwide rally in recognition of the International Day of the Girl. Each year on October 11th, LitWorld clubs conduct empowerment activities, talk about the girls and women that inspire them, and help them become leaders in their communities. At noon in their time zones, celebrants are asked to rise to symbolically stand for girls’ rights. LitWorld celebrates International Day of the Girl annually and often uses the time to highlight girls in LitClubs worldwide.

LitWorld collaborated with Global G.L.O.W (Girls Leading Our World), a non-profit creating mentorship programs for girls’ self-advocacy and community building, to create the Global HerStory Summit in 2016. The summit took place each International Women’s Day at different locations in the United States in 2016, 2017, and 2018, allowing girls and women from across Global G.L.O.W and LitWorld programs to meet, collaborate, and share their experiences. The initial summit in New York City involved 90 girls aged 10–16 and 49 mentors from 10 countries. The two organizations continued collaborating on the HerStory Campaign through 2018, hosting conversations with UN Women and other girls’ advocacy groups.

== Publisher partnerships ==
Allyn’s publishing partnership with Scholastic Corporation began when she released her first book, The Complete 4 for Literacy, in 2007. Several of her works, including Best Books for Boys (2011) and Every Child a Super Reader (2015, 2022), were launched through their publishing house. Scholastic designated her as the Global Ambassador for Scholastic's "Read Every Day. Lead a Better Life." campaign for the 2012-13 academic year, advocating for reading and access to books on all platforms, and as the National Ambassador for Open a World of Possible from 2015 to 2018. Allyn was also a frequent guest contributor to the Scholastic On Our Minds Blog, sharing the importance of listening to children and their needs for creating effective learning curricula. Upon Scholastic’s purchase of LitCamp and its licensing from LitWorld in 2016, LitCamp programs were expanded to include millions of children worldwide. Allyn joined Scholastic full-time as their Senior Vice President of Innovation and Business Development from 2018 to 2020.

Allyn also collaborated with Pearson PLC in creating the “Core Ready” instructional framework to help schools meet the Common Core educational standards. The books were used in partnership with LitLife to help implement the common core standards in schools.

Allyn has a longstanding relationship with ASCD and frequently contributes to both their online publications and their print publication EL Magazine.

Allyn is the CEO and Founder of Dewey, an educational publisher dedicated to "[making] learning joyful, purposeful and successful for children, schools and families."

== Selected books ==
Year	Title	Publisher	ISBN	Notes
2007	The Complete 4 For Literacy	Scholastic	9780439026444	Written debut. Provides an organizational framework, detailed models, lessons and practical support for mapping and building grade-specific curricula.
2008	The Complete Year in Reading and Writing	Scholastic	9780545046336	Second author; co-authored with Karen McNally. Lesson sets. Provides one year of monthly units of study focusing on four essentials of reading and writing.
2009	What to Read When: The Books and Stories to Read with Your Child - and All the Best Times to Read Them	Penguin Books	9781583333341	A book for parents, teachers, and caregivers celebrating the power of reading aloud with children.
2010	The Great Eight: Management Strategies for the Reading and Writing Classroom	Scholastic	9780545173537	First author; co-authored with Jaime Margolies and Karen McNally. Maximizing classroom productivity with management tactics.
2011	Pam Allyn's Best Books for Boys: How to Engage Boys in Reading in Ways that Will Change Their Lives	Scholastic	9780545204552	The “must-read titles” for even the “most reluctant readers.” Addresses the challenges boys face as readers and assists parents and caregivers in making sure boys read passionately.
2011	Your Child's Writing Life: How to Inspire Confidence, Creativity, and Skill at Every Age	National Geographic Books	9781583334393	Utilizes the "five keys" to help kids W.R.I.T.E.: Word Power, Ritual, Independence, Time, and Environment.
2012	Be Core Ready: Powerful, Effective Steps to Implementing and Achieving the Common Core State Standards	Pearson	9780132907460	Lesson sets. From LitLife’s Core Ready collaboration with Pearson.
2015	The Road to Knowledge: Information and Research	Pearson	9780132907514	Lesson sets. From LitLife’s Core Ready collaboration with Pearson.
2015	Every Child a Super Reader: 7 Strengths to Open a World of Possible	Scholastic	9780545948715	First author; co-authored with Dr. Ernest Morrell. Utilizes LitWorld’s 7 Strengths Framework to build a learning lifestyle and help children experience “bookjoy.”
2017	Taming the Wild Text: Literacy Strategies for Today's Reader	Shell Education	9781425816964	First author; co-authored with Monica Burns. Focuses on building critical habits to support a lifelong love and connection with reading.
2022	Tell Your Story: Teaching Students to Become World-Changing Thinkers and Writers	Association for Supervision and Curriculum Development	9781416631521	First author; co-authored with Dr. Ernest Morrell. Shares “principles and strategies to help students use their own stories.”
2022	Every Child a Super Reader, 2nd Edition: 7 Strengths for a Lifetime of Independence, Purpose, and Joy	Scholastic	9781338832341	First author; co-authored with Dr. Ernest Morrell. Updated edition of the 2015 book of the same name.

== Selected awards ==
Year	Award	Category	Result	Ref.	Notes
2007	James Patterson	Page Turner Award	Won		With "Open Door" program at The Children's Village
2007	The Children's Village	Legacy of Service Award	Won		
2009	Disney, Points of Light	Points of Light Foundation Award	Won		With Jim, Katie, and Charlotte Allyn
2013	Scholastic	Literacy Champion Award	Won		
2017	The Brock Institute	Brock Prize in Education Innovation	Nominated		
2017	Teachers College, Columbia University	Distinguished Alumni Career Award	Won		
2018	National Council of Teachers of English	CEL Kent Williamson Exemplary Leader Award	Won		
2024	Titan Women In Business Awards	Entrepreneur of the Year (New Start Up)	Won		
