= Rawley Silver =

American art therapist, artist, author, and educator

Rawley Silver is an American art therapist, artist, author and educator. She has worked with different populations with her strong belief in using art as a form of language. She has created tests to screen for cognitive and emotional disturbances in children with hearing impairments, stroke patients and individuals with learning disabilities and those with emotional issues such as aggression and depression. Through her work in the field, Silver has contributed over eighty published works, including journal articles, books and other publications, and she has presented at over seventy conferences and universities. A collection of her journal articles is archived with the American Art Therapy Association, The National Museum of Women in the Arts and with the Smithsonian Institution. Two traveling exhibits, held by the Smithsonian Institution, circulated her work with artwork from both children and adults with hearing impairments - "Shout In Silence" - and adult stroke patients - "Art As Language". Silver has been an honorary member of the American Art Therapy Association (AATA) since 1983, and has earned awards for her research in the field in 1976, 1989, 1992 and 1996. Silver is an honorary lifetime member of AATA and has been further honored by AATA creating an award in her name, the Rawley Silver Award for Excellence. This award is given to one student every year that has been accepted into an art therapy program and has at least a 3.5 grade point average. Silver finds passion and appreciation with the use of art in art therapy within her assessments and in her own artwork. She urges that a passion for art does not have to lose its importance while pursuing a career path as an art therapist. Her artwork creations consist of portraits including poetic verses as well as nature related paintings. Some of these were exhibited at the George Washington University Art Therapy Gallery during summer 2014.

== Life and work ==
Silver graduated from Cornell University in 1939 with a bachelor's degree in philosophy and studio art. She went on to study at the School of Social Work at Smith College from 1940 to 1941. Silver worked as a medical social worker and volunteered to work in a school that had no art teacher. In 1962, she attended the Teachers College of Columbia University, where she received her Doctorate of Education and Masters’ of Arts degree in fine arts and fine arts education in 1966.

During this time, Silver began working with individuals with disabilities, especially children with auditory disorders. Silver discovered at this time that communication is a problem not only for those persons who have language disorders, but also for those who work with them. Temporarily deaf herself during a period in her life, she was able to personally understand that difficulty in the communication. Due to this barrier, she began utilizing stimulating drawings in her work with patients. Due to this barrier, she began utilizing stimulating drawings in her work with patients. In her book, Art as Language, Silver stated one could use drawings to bypass language problems and assess cognitive skills. She went on to conduct research projects on this subject, supported by the U.S. Office of Education and the National Institute of Education, among others.

== Silver Drawing Assessments ==
During her work in the field, Silver created two assessments: the Silver Drawing Test and Draw a Story. Her assessments use stimulus drawings to bypass language disorders in assessing cognitive skills, and to provide access to emotions and attitudes. The Silver Drawing Test, which measures perceptions essential to mathematics and reading, has three subtests: drawing from imagination, drawing from observation and predictive drawing. The Drawing from Imagination test in the Silver Drawing Test is similar to Silvers’ assessment, Draw a Story.

The Silver Drawing Test and Draw a Story assessments provide quantitative findings of reliability, validity, normative data and outcome studies that assess changes in cognitive skills or emotional states following remedial programs. In addition, they provide case studies and drawing responses by children, adolescents and adults in clinical and non-clinical populations. The assessments use stimulus drawings to elicit responses. Responses are scored on 5-point rating scales that range from low to high levels of Ability to Select, Combine, and Represent, and from strongly negative to strongly positive Emotional Content, Self-Image, and when appropriate, Use of Humor. The findings, by mental health professionals and educators not only in the USA but also in Europe, Asia and South America, include age, gender and cultural difference and similarities. The three subtests of the Silver Drawing Test assess the three concepts said to be fundamental in reading and mathematics: Drawing from Imagination assesses concepts of class inclusion; Predictive Drawing, concepts of sequential order; and Drawing from Observation, concepts of space. The Draw A Story assessment is used to screen for masked depression that may lead to suicide, and reactive or predatory aggression that may lead to violence in schools.

Predictive Drawing assesses clients' grasp of the concepts of sequential order, horizontality and verticality. In this test, there are three separate tests. One, which measures sequential order, shows an ice cream float in a clear glass and six empty glasses. The client is directed to draw lines in the empty glasses to show how the glasses would appear if the float were drunk with a straw. The next one, which measures horizontality, shows two empty bottles. One is upright, and the other tilted to the side. The client draws lines in the bottles to show where water would be with the bottles filled up halfway. The last test, which measures verticality, presents the clients with a drawing of a house sitting on top of a mountain. Clients draw the way the house would look if it moved to the spot marked with an “X” on the slope. Once these are finished, the assessment is complete.

The Draw a Story test, used most often on children and adolescents, is used to screen for depression by looking at negative and positive themes to responses. The client chooses two pictures from two forms that contain stimulus drawings, and imagine a story between them. They are then directed to draw a story between them.

== Books by Rawley Silver ==
- The Silver Drawing Test and Draw A Story: Assessing Depression, Aggression, and Cognitive Skills
- Aggression and Depression Assessed Through Art
- Art as Language, Access to Thoughts and Feelings Through Stimulus Drawings
- Three Art Assessments
- Developing Cognitive and Creative Skills Through Art
