= Harlem Village Academies =

Network of charter schools in New York City

- New York, NY; United States

Information
- Grades: PreK-12
- Website: https://harlemvillageacademies.org/

Harlem Village Academies (HVA) is a group of five charter schools in Harlem, New York serving students from PreK through 12th grade. HVA is known for its deeper learning philosophy, and is the only group of charter schools in New York State offering Montessori early childhood education and the International Baccalaureate (IB) program. It has produced high levels of academic performance, ranking at the very top compared to state, city, charter, and district averages.

== Mission ==
Harlem Village Academies prepares students to become intellectually sophisticated, wholesome in character, avid readers, fiercely independent thinkers, and compassionate individuals who graduate from college and make a meaningful contribution to society.

== Academic Performance ==
Harlem Village Academies has consistently posted strong academic outcomes. According to the New York State Department of Education, for the most recent state tests in 2025, 90% of HVA students scored proficient in reading (English Language Arts), compared to a statewide average of 53%, and 94% of students scored proficient in mathematics, compared to 55% statewide.

The schools report that 100% of their seniors are accepted to 4-year colleges.

== History ==
In 2002, after two years of field research, fundraising, education design, and startup planning by the founder Dr. Deborah Kenny, the Harlem Village Academies charters were submitted and subsequently approved by the Charter Schools Institute of the State University of New York. In its early years HVA partnered with a local community based organization, the East Harlem Council for Community Improvement (EHCCI).

In 2003, the first HVA was opened as a middle school in Harlem with Dr. Kenny serving as founding principal. The first class of students entered the school 5th grade. In 2005, the second HVA middle school was opened. The two middle schools are called HVA West Middle and HVA East Middle. "The majority of the youngsters come into the middle schools performing at three to four years behind their grade levels." In thinking about the design for the schools, "It never crossed Ms. Kenny's mind that a rich and abiding intellectual life was out of the reach of the kids growing in a tough urban environment."

In August 2007, HVA opened its third school: a high school called HVA High. The high school was initially located inside the EHCCI community center, and eventually developed a new school facility build through a public-private partnership. In 2009, with 400 students on the wait list ofr its middle schools, Mayor Michael Bloomberg called HVA "the poster child for this country" and a model of President Obama's educational aspirations.

In 2012, HVA opened its fourth and fifth schools: the two HVA elementary schools. The first class of elementary students entered in kindergarten. These schools are known as HVA East Elementary and HVA West Elementary. The vision for the kindergarten program was inspired by early childhood development experts such as Nancy Carlsson-Paige. The HVA kindergarten promoted the idea that, "Play is not a break from learning or a way to fill time for the little ones: play, imagination and discovery are how kindergartners learn."

In 2013, it established the Deeper Learning Institute (DLI), a graduate program resulting in a master's degree and certifications in both elementary and special education, to support instructional practices.

In 2016, consistent with Kenny's vision of deeper learning, HVA began offering the International Baccalaureate (IB), and in 2020 shifted to "IB for All" in which all students are engaged in a rigorous course of study. In 2020, as part of Kenny's expansion of the organization's focus on deeper learning at all grade levels, Kenny conceived of the idea of opening a PreK based on the Montessori method. The first HVA Montessori PreK program opened in 2021.

== Schools ==
Schools in the network include:

| School | Grades Served | Location |
|---|---|---|
| HVA East Elementary | PreK-4 | 2351 1st Avenue |
| HVA West Elementary | PreK-4 | 74 West 124th Street |
| HVA East Middle | 5-8 | 2351 1st Avenue |
| HVA West Middle | 5-8 | 244 West 144th Street |
| HVA High | 9-12 | 35 West 124th Street |

== Instructional Approach ==
The schools emphasize a deeper learning approach focused on critical thinking, intrinsic motivation, problem solving, student self-direction, and challenging curriculum, including:

=== Montessori PreK ===
HVA operated a Montessori-based PreK progrma designed to promote student independence, concentration, and self-directed learning. The program emphasized extended periods of focused work, student responsibility, and the use of specialized instructional materials.

The Montessori program was introduced in the 2021-22 school year. As of 2026, HVA is pursuing accreditation by the American Montessori Society, which would make it one of just 16 AMS public member schools that have completed this rigorous process.

=== International Baccalaureate ===
HVA High School offers the International Baccalaureate (IB) Diploma Programme. The school follows an "IB for All" model, in which all students complete the requirements of the IB diploma sequence as a condition of graduation.

The IB curriculum includes advanced coursework across mathematics, science and technology, English, literature, language acquisition, history, civics, and the arts, as well as unique core components including theory of knowledge, extended essays, and interdisciplinary assessments.
