= Audrea Kreye =

American educator and artist (1919–2010)

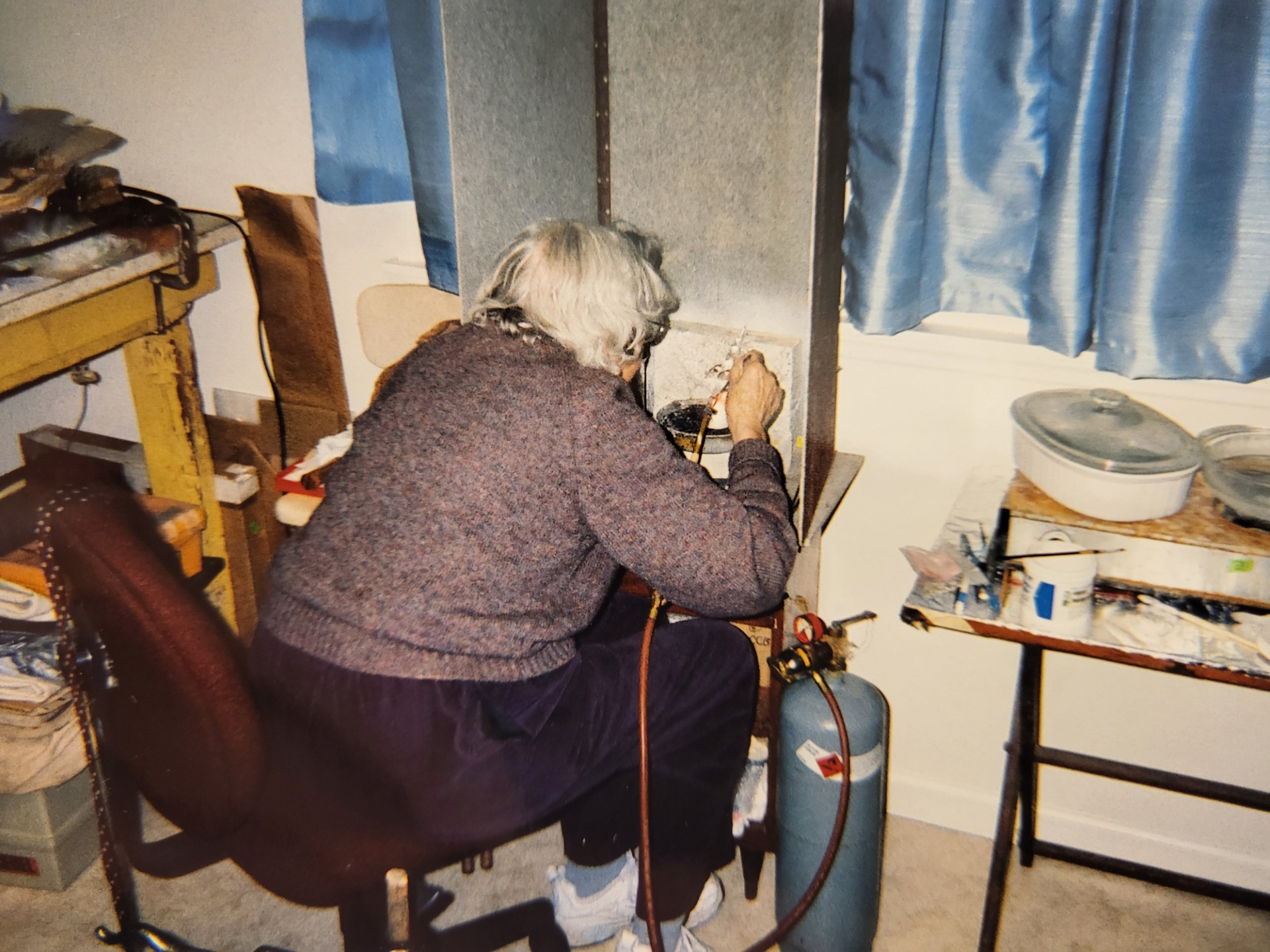
- Kreye working
- Born: Lillian Audrea Coddington; February 16, 1919; Plainfield, New Jersey, US
- Died: April 3, 2010 (aged 91); Dayton, Ohio, US
- Education: Keuka College, Columbia University
- Known for: Jewelry, metalworking, silversmithing
- Movement: anticlastic design

Lillian Audrea Coddington Kreye (February 16, 1919 – April 3, 2010), known professionally as Audrea Kreye, was an American educator, artist, metalsmith, and jewelry designer. She was particularly known for her anticlastic and enameled jewelry, as well as her liturgical and religious metalworks in silver.

== Early life ==
Kreye was born in Plainfield, New Jersey, the daughter of Lillian Fedderman and William Coddington.

Kreye graduated from Plainfield High School in 1935 and received her B.A. from Keuka College in Keuka, New York, and her M.A. from Columbia University's Teacher's College in New York City. She began her career teaching French, history, and civics in New Jersey at Bound Brook High School, located in Bound Brook, New Jersey, from 1943 to 1960. She left her position due to her marriage to Warren C. Kreye and their move to Dayton, Ohio.

Though she began her career as a public school teacher, she had been interested in jewelry design and manufacture for many years. Some sources date that interest to the early 1930s when she was a teenager. She began designing and making her own jewelry, and her first known public exhibition was in 1955 at the Barbizon Plaza Art Gallery in New York City with members of the Craft Students League of the Plainfield Y.W.C.A.

== Career ==
Kreye was a student of the Finnish-American metalsmith, Heikki Seppä. She became known for her work making anticlastic jewelry, where individual pieces were formed out of single sheets of metal, primarily copper or silver. In the late 1960s and early 1970s, her husband, a chemist, helped her devise methods of using electroplating in her work. During this period, she experimented with mixing glass and stained glass into her pieces, as noted in The Complete Book of Creative Glass Art by Polly Rothenberg (1974).

By the early 1970s, Kreye was teaching jewelry making at the YWCA in Kettering, Ohio. In the mid-1970s, she also began teaching copper enameling at the Dayton Senior Citizens’ Center. From roughly 1982 until the early 2000s, Kreye was a regular instructor at the Riverbend Art Center in Dayton, during which time her work was featured in American Craft Magazine. While at Riverbend, she taught numerous local artists the techniques of metalworking and jewelry making.

== Death ==
Kreye died on April 3, 2010, in a long-term care facility near Dayton and was interred in Woodland Cemetery and Arboretum.

In 2023, Sloane Square Gallery, an arts and antiques gallery located in Huntington, West Virginia, acquired a portion of her estate and is currently offering it for sale.

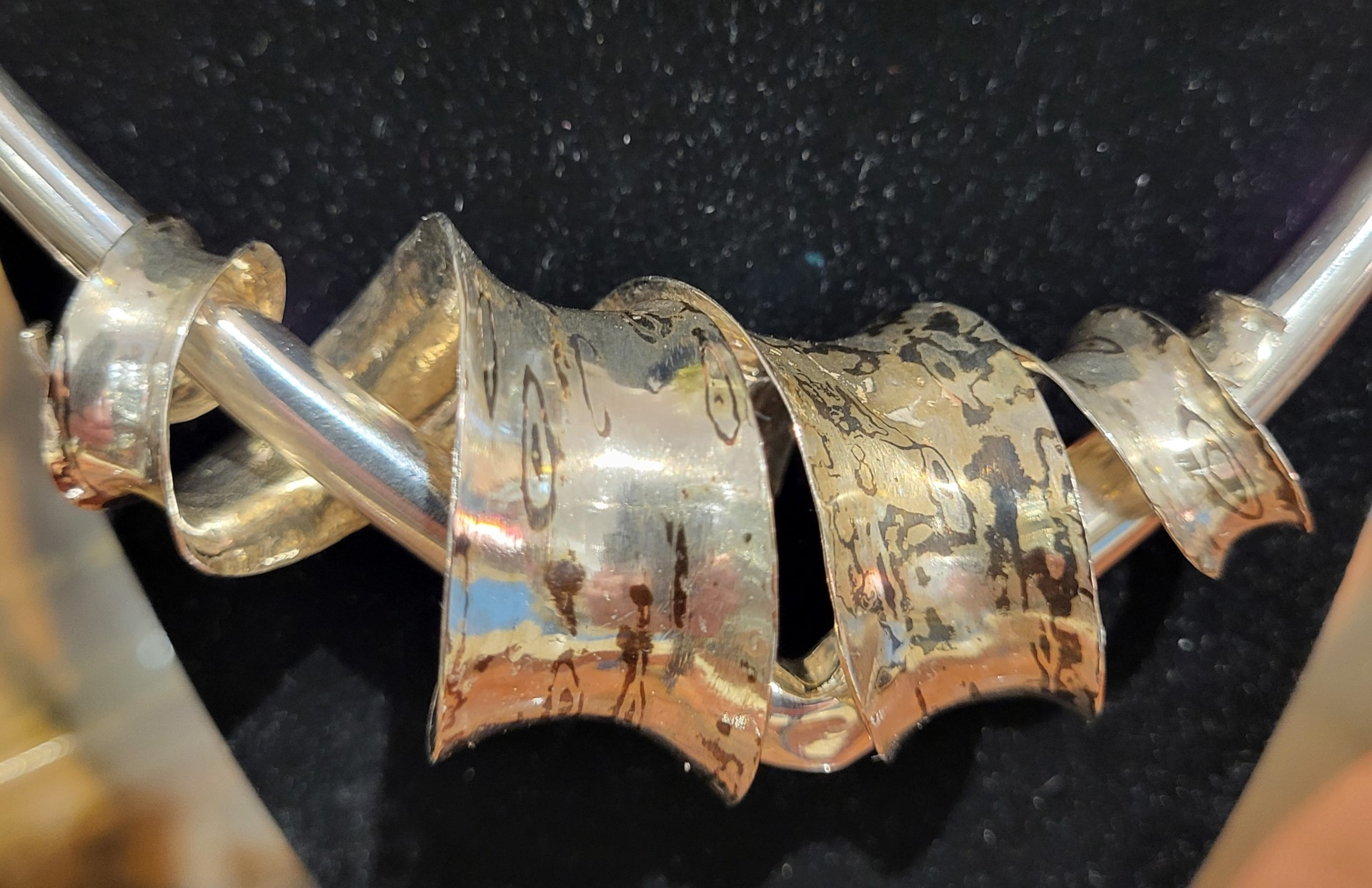
Audrea Kreye, Anticlastic silver ringlet necklace

== Exhibitions ==
- 1955 – Barbizon Plaza Art Gallery, New York City, with members of the Craft Students League of the Plainfield Y.W.C.A.
- 1975 – “Liturgical Art V,” Schumacher Gallery at Capital University, Columbus, Ohio.
- 1980 – Fifth Street Gallery, Dayton, Ohio.
- 1984 – Dayton Art Institute (where she demonstrated her technique outside the Museum Store).
- 1984 – “Religious Art ‘84, Midwest Biennial II,” St. Paul's Church Mart, Cincinnati, Ohio (where she received a Best-in-Show).
- 1991 – exhibiting and demonstrating jewelry making at the Stillwater Trading Company, Dayton, Ohio.
- 1993 – UNKNOWN EXHIBITION: Reviewed in the New Art Examiner: “Audrea Kreye's silver serpentine chalice and Laura Marth's giddy aluminum menorahs are celebratory paraphrases of traditional ceremonial vessels…”
- 1998 – “Works of Faith: Contemporary Judaic Art,” Troy-Hayner Cultural Center, Troy, Ohio.
- 1999 – “16th Biennial Juried Exhibition of the Liturgical Art Guild,” Schumacher Gallery at Capital University, Columbus, Ohio.
- 1999 – Wetlands Gallery, Dayton, Ohio (where she was one of the founders).
- 2001 – “Art in the Park,” DeWeese Park, Dayton, Ohio.
- 2003 – “Spirited Vessel,” exhibition by Kentucky Guild of Artists and Craftsmen at the Yeiser Arts Center, Paducah, Kentucky.
- 2006 – “Painting with Fire: Masters of Enameling in America, 1930-1980,” Long Beach Museum of Art, Long Beach, California, 2006 (discussed in catalog).

== Gallery ==
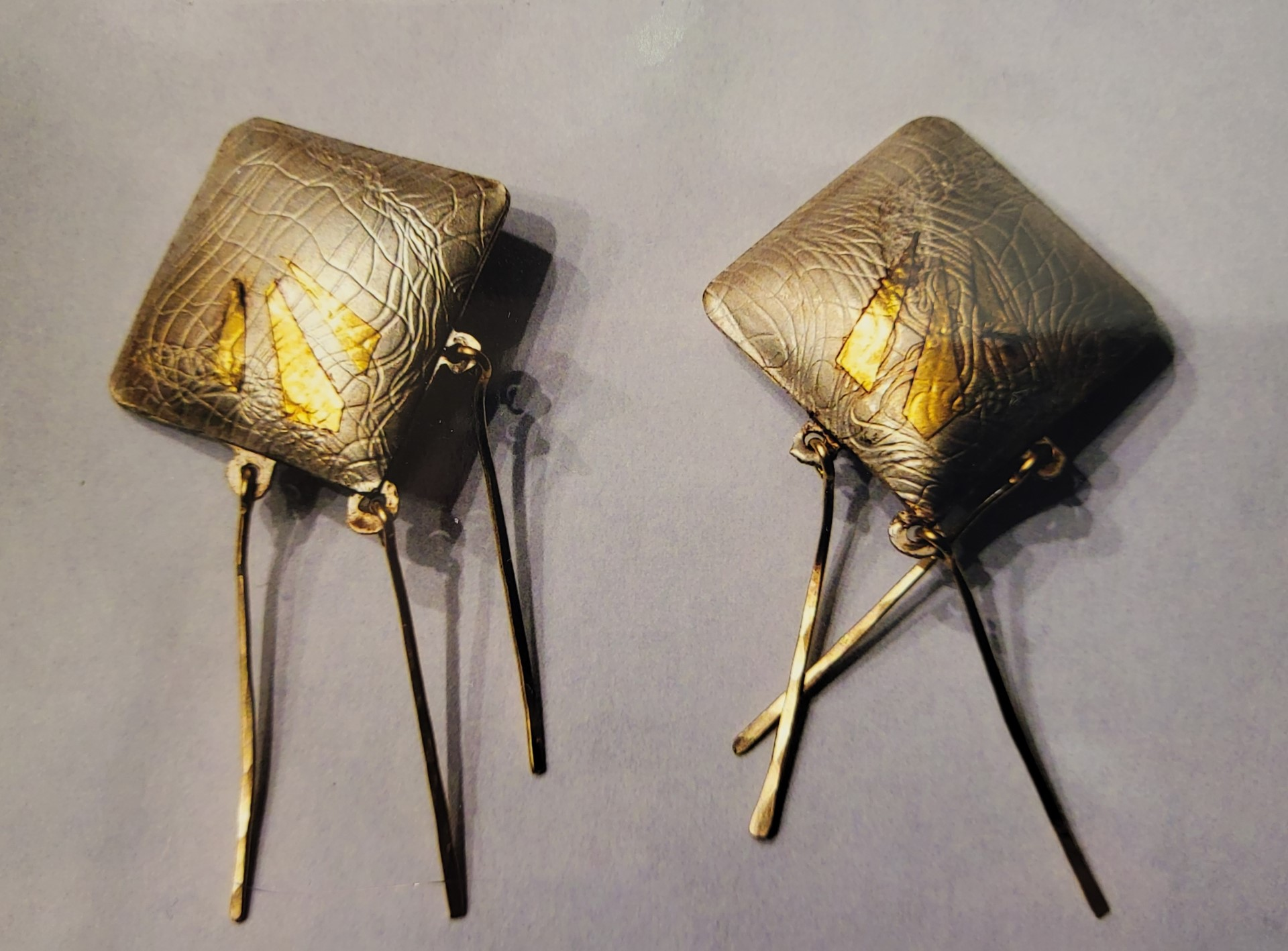
A pair of mixed metal earrings

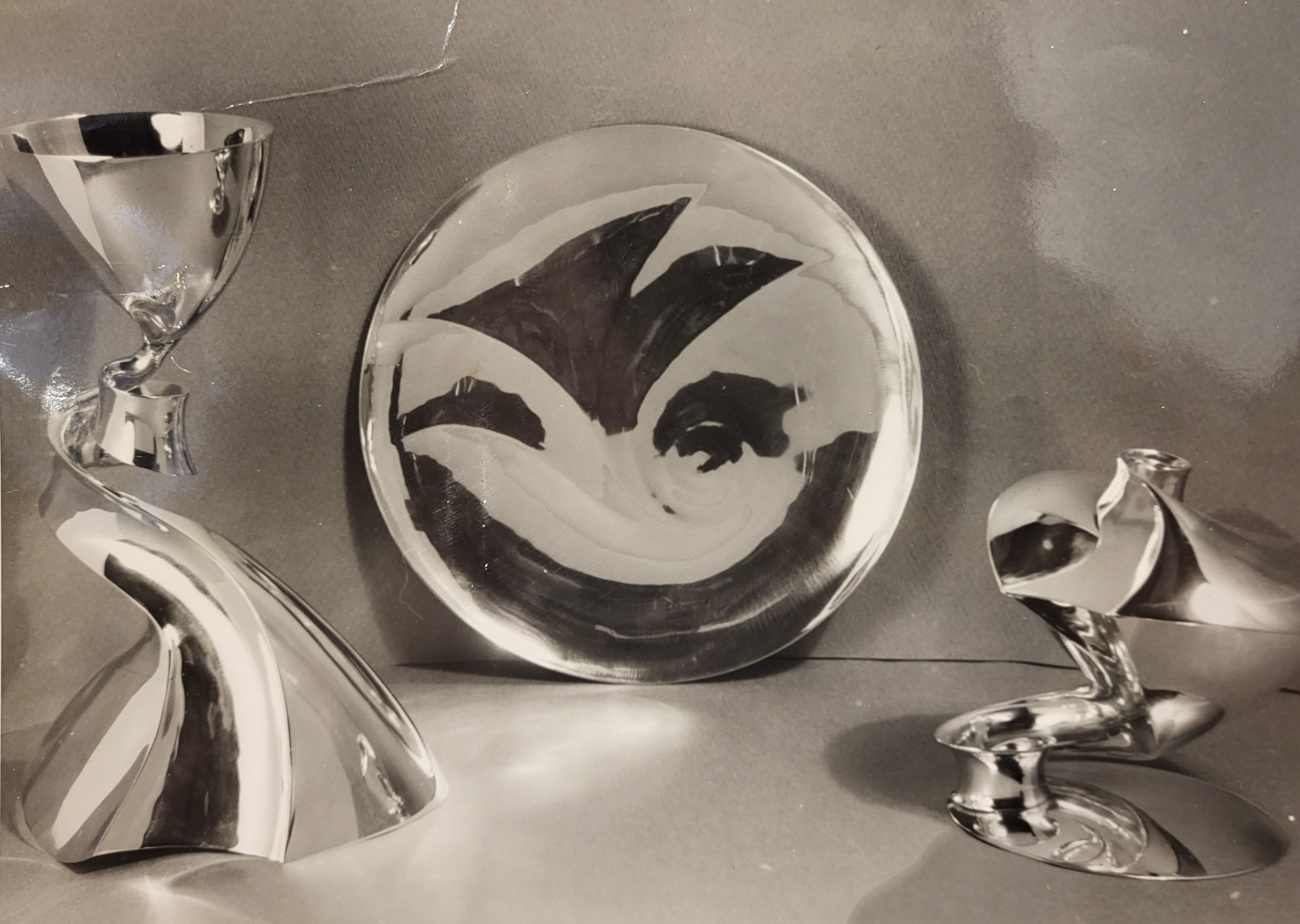
Examples of Kreye's early liturgical works in silver

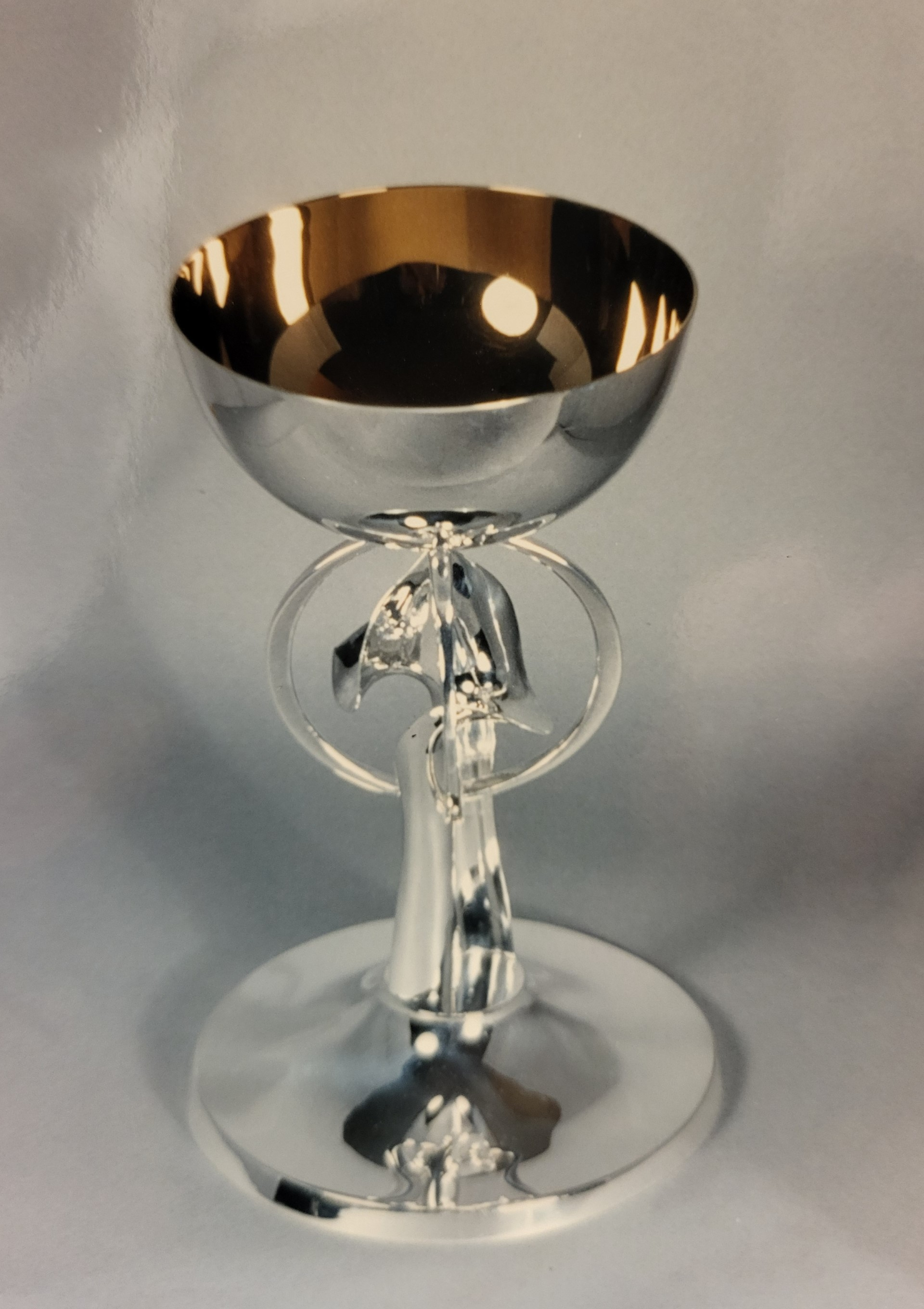
A silver chalice with gold washed interior

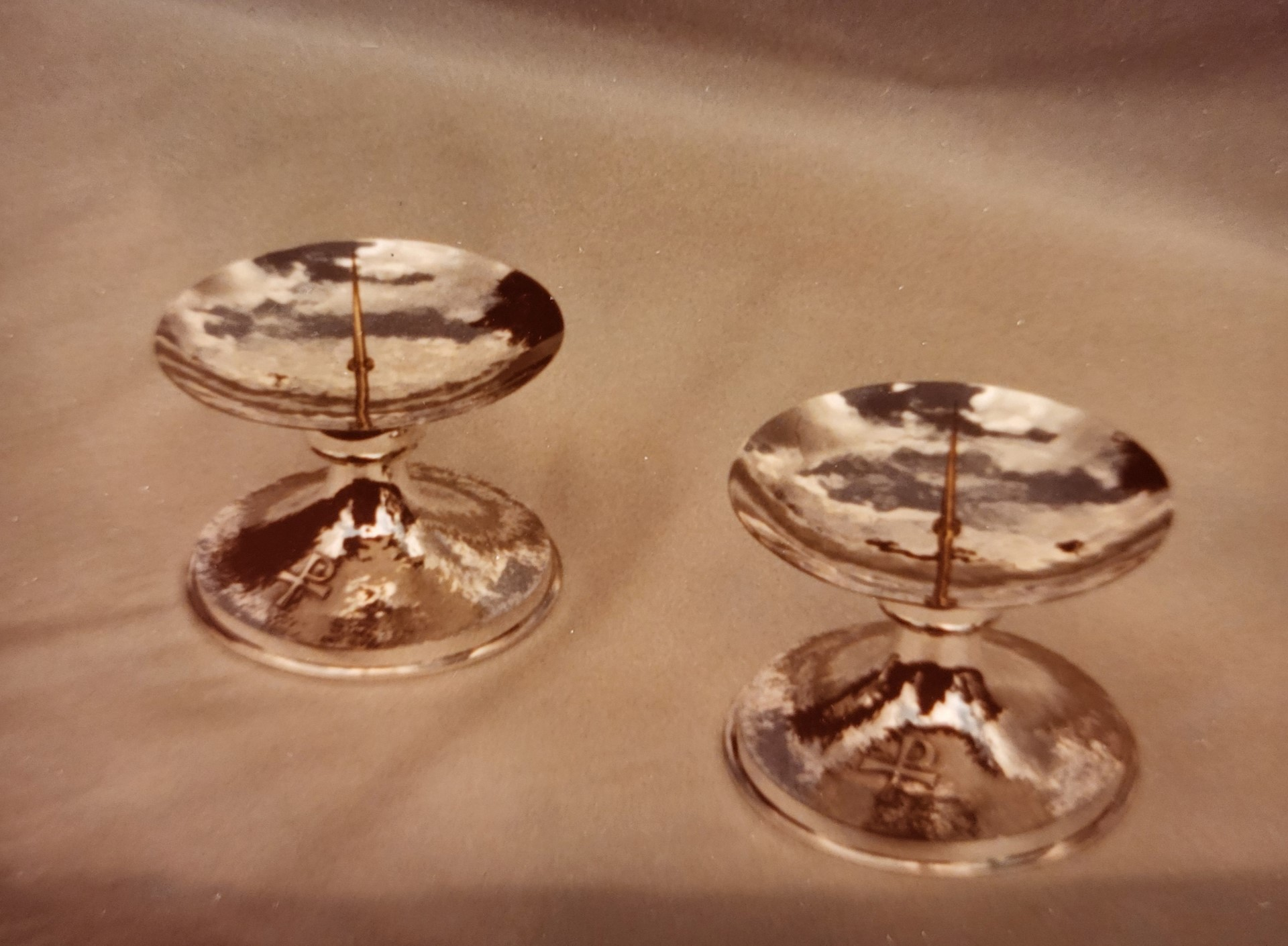
A pair of silver candlesticks

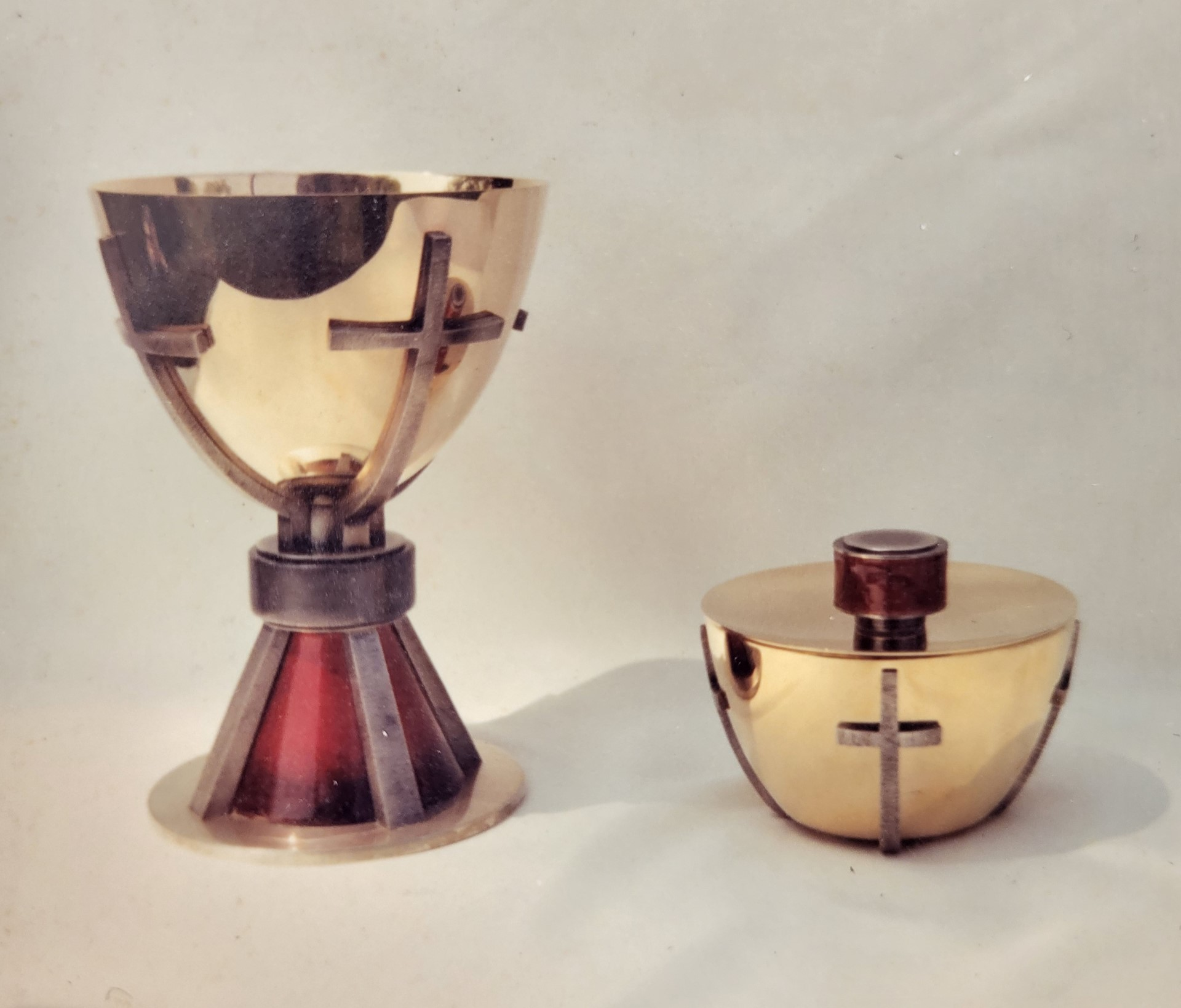
A chalice and covered communion bowl
