= Percy Hughes (philosopher) =

American philosopher and teacher (1872–1852)

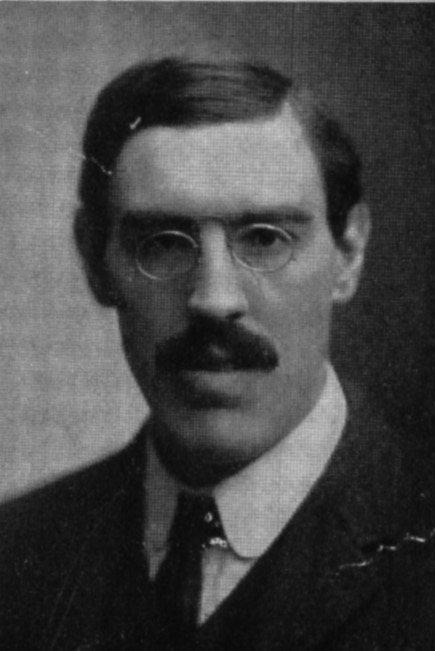
- Born: 1872; Peshawar in British India
- Died: 1952 (aged 79–80)

Academic background
- Education: Alfred University, Columbia University

Academic work
- Discipline: Psychology

Percy Hughes (1872–1952) was a philosopher and teacher, and a leading figure in the Philosophy, Education, and Psychology department at Lehigh University.

== Life ==
Hughes was born in Peshawar in British India. A child of missionary Anglican parents, Hughes lived in London before arriving to the United States at the age of 16. He received his A.B degree from Alfred University, and his MA and Ph.D. degrees from the Teachers College at Columbia University under John Dewey, who would become a lifelong friend.

Hughes joined Lehigh University in 1907 as an assistant professor of philosophy, education and psychology, and remained there until his retirement in 1942. A prolific writer, he published extensively in a variety of topics, including philosophy, education and psychology.

== Publications ==
- Hughes, Percy (1928). An Introduction to Psychology: From the standpoint of life-career. Bethlehem, Pa.: Lehigh University Supply Bureau.
