= John Seiler Brubacher =

John Seiler Brubacher (October 18, 1898 – March 8, 1988) was an American scholar who was a professor at Yale University (1928–58) and the author of many books on the subjects of philosophy of education and history of education.

== Biography ==
Brubacher was born in 1898 in Easthampton, Massachusetts. His parents were Rosa (née Haas), who had taught music, and Abram Royer Brubacher, an administrator of public schools who became president of the New York State Teachers College at Albany.

He attended public high school in Schenectady, New York and graduated from The Albany Academy after his family moved to Albany. He graduated from Yale University with a B.A. degree (1920) and Harvard Law School with a J.D. degree (1923), and spent a short period practising law. He then attended Columbia University Teachers College, gaining an M.A. degree (1924). In August 1924 he married Winifred Wemple. He taught briefly before returned to Teachers College to gain his PhD (1925–27).

In 1928 he joined the faculty at Yale, where he remained until 1958. He was at the Center for the Study of Higher Education of the University of Michigan (1958–69). His books include Modern Philosophies of Education; Higher Education in Transition: A History of American Colleges and Universities, 1636–1976 (with Willis Rudy); A History of the Problems of Education; and On the Philosophy of Higher Education. He served as president of the Philosophy of Education Society (1942–46).

In retirement he lived in Bridgeport, Connecticut. In 1972, after his first wife had died, he married Dorothy Kohler. Brubacher died on March 8, 1988.
