= Diane DiResta =

American speech pathologist

- Occupation: Communications consiltant
- Website: Official website

Diane DiResta is an American speech coach and speech pathologist.

== Career ==
DiResta started her career as a speech therapist at the NYC Board of Education, and later started a communications consultancy company. DiResta has also served as the president of the National Speakers Association.

DiResta has authored a book on public speaking, “Knockout Presentations: How to Deliver Your Message With Power, Punch, and Pizzazz.”
