= Jane Ellen McAllister =

American educator

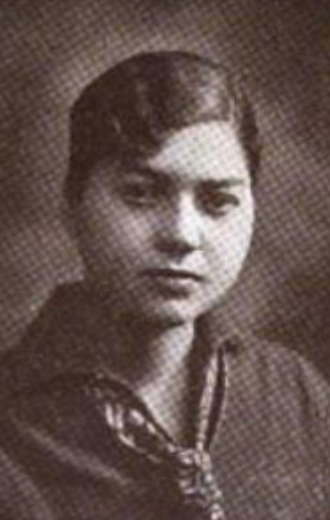
- Jane Ellen McAllister, from a 1928 publication
- Born: 24 October 1899; Vicksburg, Mississippi
- Died: 10 January 1996 (aged 96)
- Occupation: Educator
- Known for: Being the first African American woman in the United States to earn her doctorate in education

Jane Ellen McAllister (24 October 1899 – 10 January 1996) was an American educator. She was the first African American woman to earn a PhD in Education in the United States, and the first African American female in the world to be a doctoral candidate in Education.

== Life and education ==
McAllister was born in Vicksburg, Mississippi to Flora McClelland McAllister and Richard McAllister. Her father was a postman who worked in Vicksburg, and her mother was a Vicksburg public school teacher. Her mother and father both graduated from Jackson State College. Jane was extremely smart in school, and as a second-grader she even helped to teach first graders. Her school was ill-equipped, so her parents helped her learn the necessary language and math prerequisites for college by tutoring her at night using books her father borrowed. Jane graduated high school at age 15. Jane enrolled in Talladega College in Alabama, and graduated with honors in 1919. She went to the University of Michigan and earned her M.A. in 1921. In 1929, she earned her doctorate in Education from Columbia University, and was the first African American woman in the United States to earn her doctorate in education. She had one sister and one brother. McAllister was a member of Alpha Kappa Alpha sorority.

After her retirement in 1969, she lived in her home in Vicksburg, Mississippi, where she also cared for stray animals and for her sick neighbors. She died in 1996.

== Career ==
McAllister began to teach in the summer of 1919 after receiving her A.B. degree from Talladega College. She taught at Emerson College in Mobile, Alabama and at Straight University in New Orleans. She spent 25 years at Miner Teachers College now called University of the District of Columbia in Washington, D.C., where she served as Professor of Education and Chairman of the Division. In 1940 and 1941, she also was a curriculum consultant for Jackson College. This appointment was at the request of then-President of the college, Jacob L. Reddix.

McAllister taught at Jackson State University from 1952 to 1967. She was also the first person to bring tele-lecture technology to the university. During her career, she worked to help enhance teacher education programs for African American teachers at Historically black colleges and universities. She also organized many different programs to aid disadvantaged children to be better able to attend college, and also served on many boards of education and as a delegate to conferences. McAllister also authored numerous articles in journals on education. Additionally, over her career, she taught at Southern University, Grambling State University, Fisk College, Virginia State University, Dillard University, and many more universities until her 1970 retirement. She continued to mentor students after her retirement in 1969.

== Awards ==
McAllister was a Dean's Scholar at Columbia University in 1949. She was also an observer at the White House Conference on Education in 1955. In 1989, Jackson State University dedicated a women's hall of residence to McAllister and her colleague, Mary Whiteside. McAllister also has a university lecture series named in her honor at Jackson State University. In 2011, plans were entered for her home to become a museum in her honor.
