= Teacher Corps =

Education program

Teacher Corps, whose correct title was the National Teacher Corps, was a program established by the United States Congress in the Higher Education Act of 1965 to improve elementary and secondary teaching in predominantly low-income areas.

The program was based on The Metropolitan Milwaukee Teacher Education Program model created by Dr. Martin Haberman.

Individual Teacher Corps projects were developed by "institutions of higher education" (colleges or universities with a teacher-training program) in partnership with local school districts. The local director was a college professor, and courses specific to teaching inner city students and disadvantaged students were developed by the college and used in the master's level education program. Teams of interns under the supervision of master teachers worked in the district's schools to help carry out project goals. The purpose of the Teacher Corps was to train and retain teachers for disadvantaged school districts, who would work with the communities they served. Some of the interns became teachers in the communities they had worked in after the program ended. Others took jobs elsewhere teaching disadvantaged students, usually in their home states. Interns worked on community projects in addition to teaching. One of the Trenton, NJ community programs that continued for years after the program ended, was an annual carnival fundraiser to raise money for the Mott Elementary School library.

The director of the Trenton Teacher Corps was Dr. Bernard Schwartz of Trenton State University. The Coordinator, who represented the Trenton Public Schools, was Bernice J. Munce. The interns were trained by the following team leaders: Daisy Morgan, Elise Collins, James Lodge, Anna Eure and Catherine Johnson. This program ended in 1970 with 21 interns completing the program.

Some of the participants were volunteers coming from Vista and Peace Corps programs, who had taught people and done community outreach, but who lacked formal training in teaching. When the revolution that brought Gaddafi to power in Libya broke out in September, 1969, he accused the Peace Corps volunteers of being CIA agents, and they had to leave the country. Some of these volunteers entered the Teacher Corps.

Originally one of Lyndon Johnson's Great Society programs, Teacher Corps, along with more than 40 other programs related to education, was replaced by block grants under the Education Consolidation and Improvement Act of 1981.

A 1974 study examining 20 Teacher Corps projects that began in 1971 found that half involved elementary school children, half secondary school children. While many projects involved inner-city schools, others involved children in rural areas like the Flint Hills of Kansas or Indian reservations.

Before its demise, the Corps enlisted local colleges, public schools and poverty organizations to provide training to future teachers to train them in the cultural and social traits of low income, socially disadvantaged persons to enable them to more effectively teach in the inner city elementary schools.

The interns and their team leaders participated in and developed community involvement activities in the various neighborhoods where their schools were located. They taught full-time, worked on a master's degree full-time, and did community service work to provide enrichment for the children they taught and to enhance the communities they lived in. They modified their curriculum to eliminate deficits and adjustment problems to school caused by social and educational deprivation. The interns and their team leaders created community outreach programs to get the community involved and to bring more community resources into the schools.

The idea of a teachers corps was reestablished as the non-profit organization Teach for America, which receives federal support as an AmeriCorps program. Reestablishing a National Teachers Corps has been suggested by the Democratic Leadership Council. In his 2006 State of the Union address George W. Bush proposed an effort to train more K-12 math and science teachers as part of the American Competitiveness Initiative.

== See also ==
Teach For America
