= Daisy Nwachukwu =

Nigerian academic

- Born: Daisy Nwachukwu; 1942 (age 83–84); Ihie Isiala Ngwa
- Citizenship: Nigerian
- Occupation: Professor of Education
- Title: Professor
- Children: 5
- Parent(s): Robert and Mabel Nwachukwu
- Awards: Honor student Awards at the university of Nigeria Mission scholarship from the Niger Delta

Academic background
- Education: Phd- Colombia University Teachers College Master of Education- Colombia university Teachers college Master of Arts -Colombia university Teachers college
- Alma mater: Colombia University Teachers College

Academic work
- Discipline: Education
- Institutions: University of Calabar Nigeria
- Main interests: Education, Counselling and Theology

Daisy Nwachukwu (born 1942) was a Nigerian scholar, counsellor and theologian. She was the first female professor in the Department of Education at the University of Calabar and the third female professor at the university. She was a pioneering member of the Circle of Concerned African Women Theologians and the founder of the Robert Institute for Mission and Development (RIMAD), an organization affiliated with Ajayi Crowther University, Oyo State. She wrote on education, counselling and theology, with a focus on issues affecting women in Africa.

== Early life and family ==
Nwachukwu was born in 1942 in Ihie, Isiala Ngwa, present-day Abia State, Nigeria to Robert and Mabel Nwachukwu, who were missionaries in the Anglican Church. She has five children and other adopted sons and daughters.

== Educational background ==
Nwachukwu attended various primary and secondary schools in the Eastern region of Nigeria. After completing her General Certificate of Education (O and A Levels), she joined the University of Nigeria Nsukka in 1965, and pursued a bachelor's degree in French and English. Despite interruptions caused by the Nigerian Civil War, she completed her bachelor's degree and graduated in 1972. Nwachukwu then furthered her studies at Teachers College, Columbia University in New York where she earned three degrees: Master of Arts (M.A), Master of Education (M.ed) and Doctor of Education (Ed.D.). She also did her Ph.D studies in pastoral counselling.

== Career ==
Nwachukwu returned to Nigeria after completing her postgraduate studies and joined the National Commission for UNESCO Nigeria, under the Federal Ministry of Education in Lagos, where she held leadership roles in Education. She later moved into academia at the University of Calabar, where she served as the Head of Department of Educational Foundation and Administration. She also helped establish a sub-department of Library Studies. At the University of Calabar, she became the first woman to serve as Dean of any faculty and was appointed as the first female professor in the Faculty of Education, making her the third woman to hold a professorship in the entire institution.

Nwachukwu also served as the University Orator and delivered the institution's 39th inaugural lecture. She helped design the institution's practicum framework for guidance and counselling at both undergraduate and postgraduate levels. She also introduced new postgraduate courses such as PhD in Pastoral Counselling. Nwachukwu supervised students including 21 doctoral graduates, many of whom went on to become professors, provosts, and Vice Chancellors. She also developed a novel therapeutic framework known as the 'Five Faces' of Man, encompassing both spirituality and psychotherapy. At a seminar during the inception of the Circle of Concerned African Women Theologians, she presented a paper titled 'The Context of African Women's Life' in which she opposed the unfair treatment of women and the stigmatization they faced. Among her most notable works is Women and Religion, which examines the challenges faced by women in society.

Nwachukwu was a member of several professional and academic bodies, including: the Circle of Concerned African Women Theologians, the Counselling Association of Nigeria, the American Psychological Association, the American Association of Counselling Development, the Society for International Development, the African Association for Pastoral and Counselling Studies, the Women Health and Research Network in Nigeria, the International Women's Health Coalition, the Society of International Care and Counselling, American Educational Research Association, the Reading Association of Nigeria and the American Association for Pastoral Counselling. She also worked as a consultant in several African countries, including Senegal, Ghana, Benin, Cameroon, Kenya and South Africa, as well as in several European countries, such as France, Poland, Switzerland and Germany. She was an International Visiting Scholar at the University of Edinburgh, Scotland, in 1991, and served as a consultant to organizations including the World Council of Churches in Geneva, Lutheran World Federation, UNICEF, UNESCO, the Oxford Centre for Mission Studies in England, the Society for Intercultural Pastoral Care and Counselling (Germany), and the United Nations Women and Development Peace Education Program, USA.

== Community work ==
Nwachukwu founded the Robert Institute for Mission and Development (RIMAD), which blended spirituality with Psychotheraphy and partnered with Ajayi Crowther University to offer diplomas in Christian Counselling. She also served as a trustee of the Chapel of Redemption at the University of Calabar, inaugurated the Grace consulate, and was active in the Sisters Bethany Fellowship. Nwachukwu retired after 33 years of service at the University of Calabar. She was recognized in the 2018 Festschrift, Counselling, Globalization and Vocationalisation of Education in Multicultural Settings for her contributions in academia, faith, and community. Her legacy continues through her students, her writings, and her role in African Women's Theology and pastoral counselling.

Nwachukwu received scholarships and awards, including the Mission Scholarship from the Niger Delta, Diocese of the Anglican Communion (1965–1966), an Honoured Student Award at the University of Nigeria,Nsukka (1966–1967), the Federal Government of Nigeria Scholarship (1978–1980), and the Columbia University Graduate Research Fellowship. She participated in 53 Conferences – 23 international, 14 national, and 13 state-level.Nwachukwu co-authored 83 articles published in recognized national and international journals.

== Selected works ==
- Nwachukwu, D.N. Women and Religion. Series: Ecumenical Decade of Churches with Solidarity with Women.
- Nwachukwu, D.N. The Context of African Women's Life.
- Nwachukwu, D.N. Jubilee in the Milieu of Tension ( Religious, Social, Economic and Political): The African Woman's Dilemma.
