= Jerome T. Murphy =

American professor

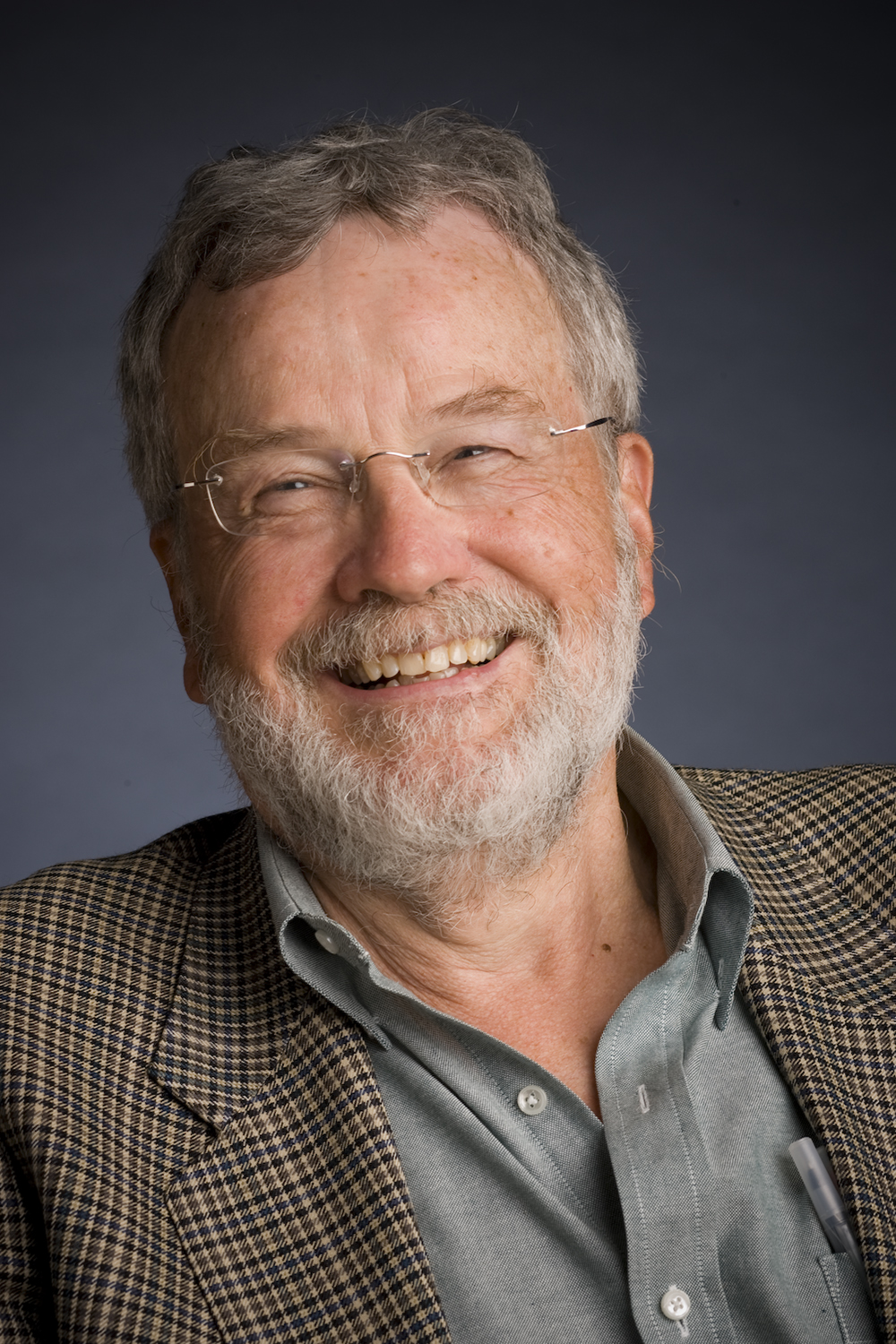
- Jerome T. Murphy
- Born: 1938 (age 87–88); New York City, NY
- Education: Columbia & Harvard

Jerome T. (Jerry) Murphy (born 1938) is the Harold Howe II Professor of Education Emeritus and Dean Emeritus at the Harvard Graduate School of Education. Jerry Murphy's current teaching and research focuses on the inner life of education leaders and how to find meaning and vitality in the midst of stress and strain.

== Life and career ==
Murphy has two degrees from Columbia University; a B.A. from Columbia College and a M.A. from Teachers College. He also has an Ed.D. from the Harvard Graduate School of Education.

Murphy started his career with two years as a public school math teacher in Manhasset, New York. He then worked for the federal government as part of the War on Poverty. He was part of a team that helped develop the Elementary and Secondary Education Act of 1965, and he later spent a year as the associate director of the White House Fellows program and Associate Staff Director of the National Advisory Council on the Education of Disadvantaged Children.

After the election of Richard Nixon, Murphy left his position and became a doctoral student at the Harvard Graduate School of Education, where he has been ever since.

Murphy has studied and written about the everyday realities of education. He became a specialist in the politics of education, with a focus on government policy, program implementation and evaluation, organizational leadership, and qualitative methodology. Murphy conducted some of the earliest studies of the implementation of the Great Society education programs and the role of the states in educational policy and governance, and contributed to novel data-collection techniques in educational evaluation. He has written books and articles about these topics as well as about schools of education, about the lives of education leaders, and about the changing roles of school superintendents and chief state school officers.

Notable Published Works:

- The Unheroic Side of Leadership: Notes from the Swamp. San Francisco, CA In The Jossey-Bass Reader on Educational Leadership (pp. 51–62) John Wiley & Sons, Inc. 2007
- Embracing Confusion: What Leaders Do When They Don’t Know What to Do. (co-author) Phi Delta Kappan, Volume 86, No. 5, January 2005, (pp. 358–366)
- State Leadership in Education: On Being a Chief State School Officer. (Editor) Washington, DC: Institute for Educational Leadership, 1980
- Getting the Facts: A Fieldwork Guide for Evaluators and Policy Analysts. Santa Monica, CA: Goodyear Publishing Company, 1980
- The Education Bureaucracies Implement Novel Policy: The Politics of Title I ESEA 1965-1972. Boston, MA: Little, Brown and Company Policy and Politics in America edited by Allan P. Sindler, 1973

Murphy has also examined educational policy and practices in Australia, China, Colombia, England, Japan, and South Africa, and has given presentations at international exchange meetings in Denmark, Israel, Norway, Russia, Saudi Arabia, Sweden, and Thailand.

For nearly 20 years, Murphy was a full-time administrator at the Harvard Graduate School of Education, first as associate dean from 1982 to 1991 and then as dean from 1992 to 2001. As dean, Murphy led the development of new initiatives in learning technologies, arts education, neuroscience, and school leadership. He also led a capital campaign, which raised almost twice the anticipated goal. For his efforts at the Harvard Graduate School of Education he was honored with an endowed chair named after him.

In 2016 Harvard Education Press published Murphy's book, Dancing in the Rain: Leading with Compassion, Vitality, and Mindfulness in Education, a guide for education leaders in applying mindfulness and self-compassion for developing inner strengths.
