= Martin Haberman =

American academic

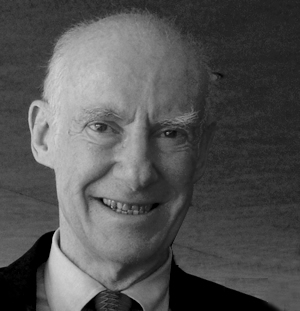
Martin Haberman

Martin Haberman (1932 – January 1, 2012) was an educator who developed interviewing techniques for identifying teachers and principals who will be successful in working with poor children. The most widely known of his programs was (The National) Teacher Corps, which was based on his intern program in Milwaukee. He was an advisor to alternative certification programs around the United States and developed ways of bringing more minorities into teaching. His developmental efforts were focused on helping to resolve the crises in urban schools serving fifteen million at-risk students by helping these school districts "grow their own" teachers and principals. Haberman was a distinguished professor at the University of Wisconsin–Milwaukee. He served six years as editor of the Journal of Teacher Education, and eleven years as a dean in the University of Wisconsin–Milwaukee. The Haberman Educational Foundation was established to promote his methods.

Haberman was the author of several books and is widely cited in news media as an education expert, specializing in teaching training and the factors contributing to teacher success.
