= Leonie Haimson =

Haimson in 2018

Leonie Haimson is the founder and executive director of Class Size Matters, a non-profit organization based in New York City that advocates nationally for smaller classes. The New York Times education editor, Alison Mitchell, acknowledged her as New York City's “leading proponent of smaller classes.” She has also been active in other civic aspects of school education.

== Biography ==
Haimson is a graduate of Harvard College with a BA in Social Studies. She was a public school parent for fifteen years, and became involved in advocating for smaller classes when her first child was in first grade. She worked for the Educational Priorities Panel until she started Class Size Matters in 2000. She lives in New York City and is married to climate scientist Michael Oppenheimer. They have two children.

== Work ==
Haimson founded Class Size Matters, a non-profit based in New York City, which advocates for class size reduction in New York City public schools and nationally. The organization provides information on the benefits of smaller classes, particularly for at-risk children, to boost student learning, engagement, and graduation rates, and lower disciplinary referrals.

She co-founded Parents Across America, and is currently a board member of the Network for Public Education. She is on the Steering Committee of New York State Allies for Education, a coalition of groups which led the state exam opt-out movement across NY State; 20% of children did not participate in 2015.

She was a prominent figure in the nationwide privacy fight against inBloom Inc., designed as a repository of data collected about individual school students. The corporation received $100 million in start up funding from the Gates Foundation. After every district and state withdrew from inBloom because of parent protests, the corporation closed its doors in April 2014. In July 2014, she co-founded the Parent Coalition for Student Privacy.

In 2012, she brought attention to an absurd passage and its associated questions, which had been recycled on numerous Pearson-produced state exams. The story, about unanswerable questions for a passage about a talking pineapple, went viral. The passage was regarded as emblematic of the lack of oversight and accountability of standardized exams. In May 2015, John Oliver discussed the Pineapple passage during his HBO show.

In 2015, she alerted elected officials and the media to an inflated $1.1 billion New York City education contract. The company had been involved in a kickback scheme just a few years before, and was the highest cost bidder. The cost of the contract was reduced within 24 hours by about $500 million. Although the contract was then awarded, this award was later revoked; an unbundled rebidding process resulted in further substantial savings.

== Awards ==
In 2007, she received the John Dewey award from the United Federation of Teachers. She was named one of the city's “family heroes” by NYC Family Magazine in 2008, and was honored as an “Extraordinary Advocate for our Children” by Advocates for Justice in 2012. In 2014, she received the “Parent Voice” award from Parents Across America for her work defeating inBloom Inc. In 2015, she was cited as one of the ten most influential people in education technology by Tech and Learning magazine.
