= Anice =

Anice is a given name. Notable people with the name include:

- Anice Badri (born 1990), Tunisian footballer
- Anice Das (born 1985), Indian-born Dutch speed skater
- Anice George, Indian nurse and academic
- Anice Johnson (1919–1992), American politician
- Anice Ladd Whitney (1877–1950), American writer on labor issues

Fictional characters with the name include:

- Anice Farm, from the anime television series Sonic Soldier Borgman
