= Edith Buchanan =

Canadian nurse (died 2003)

- Died: 2003
- Occupations: Nurse; Nurse educator Academic

Academic background
- Education: University of Toronto, McGill University, Teachers College, Columbia University

Academic work
- Discipline: Nursing
- Institutions: Rajkumari Amrit Kaur College of Nursing, University of Delhi, Royal Victoria Hospital, Montreal Lady Hardinge Medical College, New Delhi

Edith Buchanan (born Mary Edith Mckay) was a Canadian nurse who devoted her professional career to the development of nursing education in India. She is considered a pioneer who laid the foundation for nursing research and doctoral education in the field of nursing in India.

== Professional career ==
Buchanan worked as a Sister-Tutor at the Lady Hardinge Medical College Hospital in Delhi. In 1943, she was appointed as Vice-Principal at the School of Nursing Administration in New Delhi. When the College of Nursing, New Delhi (now Rajkumari Amrit Kaur College of Nursing)was established in 1946, she became its Vice-Principal. In 1958 on the retirement of Margaretta Craig, Buchanan was appointed the Principal. She retired from service in 1964 and returned to Canada where she lived until her death in 2003.

== Awards and honors ==
Florence Nightingale Medal by the International Committee of the Red Cross (ICRC) in 1959.
