= Rajkumari Amrit Kaur College of Nursing =

Nursing college in India

- Established: 1946
- Founder: Margaretta Craig
- Affiliations: University of Delhi
- Location: Lajpat Nagar, Delhi, India
- Website: rakcon.com

Rajkumari Amrit Kaur College of Nursing is a public funded institute administratively governed by the Ministry of Health and Family Welfare, Government of India. It is a constituent college of University of Delhi. The college ranked second in India for Nursing Education (2016).

== History ==
The history of Rajkumari Amrit Kaur College of Nursing can be traced back to the School of Nursing Administration founded in 1943.

As a temporary campus, the college was allotted the vacated American Army Barracks and its Ccensor's block at, Jaswant Singh Road, and FEB Hostel at Curzon Road Delhi walkable distance from India Gate. College of Nursing, Delhi since its inception is a constituent college of University of Delhi. In 1971, the President of India Shri. V.V. Giri laid the foundation stone for a new college campus consisting of Teaching & Administrative block, UG & PG hostels, Residential quarters/family accommodation for teachers, non-teaching staff and a playground. In July 1973 the college shifted to its permanent campus at Lajpat Nagar, Delhi.

== Etymology ==
The School of Nursing Administration amalgamated into the College of Nursing in 1946. In 1973, College of Nursing in Delhi was renamed as ‘Rajkumari Amrit Kaur College of Nursing’ after Rajkumari Amrit Kaur independent India's first Health Minister who was instrumental in the development of the college as well as the nursing profession in India.

== Campus ==
The campus is located in South East Delhi, Lajpat Nagar, adjacent to Moolchand metro station and Central School, Andrewsganj, Delhi.

== Academics ==
The college offers Undergraduate and graduate programs in nursing.

- BSc.(Hons.) Nursing
- MSc. Nursing
- M.Phil. in Nursing
- Ph.D. in Nursing

Apart from the regular academic programs, the college also serves as a study center for Indira Gandhi National Open University (IGNOU). The college is also designated as regional center for Ph.D. in Nursing program of Indian Nursing Council, a World Health Organization (WHO) supported initiative.

== Department ==
- Nursing Arts
- Medical & Surgical Nursing
- Pediatric Nursing
- Obstetrics & Obstetrical Nursing
- Psychiatric Nursing
- Nursing Research
- Community Health Nursing
- Continuing Education
- Child Guidance Clinic
- Rural Field Teaching Centre Chhawla

== Students ==
Students from almost every state & UT of India are on the rolls, international students are mainly from SAARC countries, Sub-Saharan African countries and the Middle-East. International students have to apply through the Ministry of External Affairs, Government of India.

== Successive principals ==
- Margaretta Craig OBE (1946–1958)
- Edith Buchanan (1958-1964)
- Sulochana Krishnan
- Anna Gupta (née Mathews)
- Aparna Bhaduri
- Bandana Bhattacharya
- Asha Sharma
- Kalpana Madal
- Santosh Mehta
- Harinderjeet Goyal

== Notable alumni ==
- Dr. Anice George
- Dr. Aparna Bhaduri
