= Anice George =

Indian academic (born 1961)

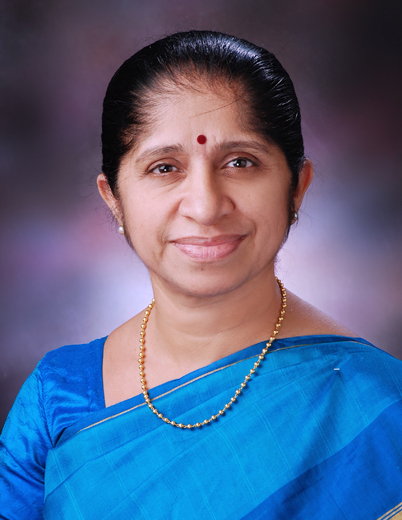
- Born: 1961 (age 64–65); Kozhikode, India
- Occupations: Nurse; Nurse Educator; Academic
- Awards: Dr. S. Thanikachalam Endowment Oration

Academic background
- Education: Christian Medical College Vellore; University of Delhi; Manipal Academy of Higher Education
- Doctoral advisor: Aparna Bhaduri

Academic work
- Discipline: Nursing
- Institutions: Manipal Academy of Higher Education
- Main interests: Nursing Education; Nursing Research
- Website: manipal.edu/mcon-manipal/about-mcon-manipal/leadership/dr-anice-george.html

Dr. Anice George, is an Indian nurse and an academician who was former Dean of Manipal College of Nursing, Manipal, and currently adjunct professor of child health nursing. She is also the academic advisor of nursing education, at Manipal Academy of Higher Education, (MAHE) Manipal, India (formerly known as Manipal University). She is a nurse educator, administrator, researcher and a registered nurse who values caring as a fundamental core of the nursing profession.

== Education ==
Dr. Anice George completed Bachelor of Science in Nursing from the College of Nursing, CMC Vellore in 1983 and Master of Science in Nursing from the same school in 1987, then a Master of Philosophy in Nursing from Rajkumari Amrit Kaur College of Nursing New Delhi , in 1993 and Doctor of Philosophy in Nursing from MAHE Manipal in 1998. She was the first Nursing professional to complete her PhD from MAHE, Manipal.

== Professional life ==
She joined the manipal group in 1991, initially as Vice Principal of the College of Nursing and served as Dean for more than a decade and currently as adjunct faculty of the Manipal College of Nursing, MAHE, which, under her stewardship has grown to be recognised as 3rd among the top Nursing Colleges in India. Formerly she served as the Assistant Dean for Preclinical Affairs at College of Nursing, Sultan Qaboos University and as Assistant Deputy Director for Nursing Education at King Khalid University Hospital, Kingdom of Saudi Arabia.

As Dean of Manipal College of Nursing, Dr. Anice George served for over a decade, during which the college expanded its academic and research activities. During her tenure, MCON Manipal strengthened its focus on nursing education and research. As a nurse educator, she has been involved in the training and professional development of nursing professionals, with an emphasis on continuing education and research capacity building. She has also contributed to mentoring and supporting nurses in their professional progression from entry-level practice to advanced roles.

In 1996, along with her mentor Prof. (Dr.) Aparna Bhaduri, she initiated the MPhil Nursing program, making MCON Manipal, the first institution to start this course in private sector. Dr George served as a member of Board of Studies at Manipal University, Yenepoya University, NITTE University, University of Mysore, and Rajiv Gandhi University of Health Sciences (RGUHS).

With an aim to develop new relationships and collaborations with institutions and universities abroad, Memorandum of Understandings (MOU) were established between Manipal College of Nursing Manipal and other institutions in the United States, United Kingdom, Singapore, and Oman.

== Research ==
She has published more than 116 scientific articles in various international and national journals and has been cited more than 470 times, giving her an H index of 12 as per Google Scholar. She serves on the editorial boards or as a reviewer at four peer-reviewed journals. She is the founding executive editor for the Manipal Journal of Nursing and Health Sciences. She was formerly the associate editor for BMC Nursing.

Her doctoral research has given new insights into role of yoga in managing dysmenorrhea and its associated symptoms among adolescent girls. Her other areas of research interests include Nursing Education, Evidence-based nursing, Palliative Care, and Pediatric Nursing. She is an approved Ph.D Guide at Manipal University and has guided more than six doctoral scholars. Dr George was invited as an expert member in the Ph.D. committees of Indira Gandhi National Open University (IGNOU), New Delhi, National Institute of Mental Health and Neuro-Sciences (NIMHANS) Bangalore and Kerala University of Health Sciences, Thrissur.

== Collaborative projects ==
Dr George is the principal investigator for a capacity building program for Nurse Educators on Geriatric Health Care and Research, funded by the Indian Council of Medical Research (ICMR) and Department of Health Research (DHR). In 2013, an endowed chair on Participatory Action Research was established at Manipal University in collaboration with Prof Basanti Majumdar from Mcmaster University, Canada. The core areas of research under this project were HIV/AIDS, Migrant Health, and Diabetes Mellitus.The project endeavored to empower nursing faculty with skills in participatory action research, in order to improve health and health care for individuals, families, communities, and society.

Dr George was one of the principal coordinators for the HIV/AIDS and ART training program for staff nurses, a collaborative project funded by the Indian Nursing Council (INC) and the Global Fund to Fight AIDS, Tuberculosis and Malaria (GFATM) from 2008 to 2013. The objective of the program was to strengthen human and institutional capacities of the national health system to enable accelerated growth of the National AIDS Control Programme. Manipal College of Nursing has bagged the first place in the implementation of this project for the year 2011 at national level.

During 2004-2005 she served as the Principal Investigator counterpart from Manipal University for the Canadian International Development Agency (CIDA) funded collaborative research with McMaster University on " Empowering village women - focus group on HIV & AIDS prevention".

== Publications ==
Some publications of Dr. George are

- George, A., Bhaduri, A., Sen, S., & Choudhry, V. P. (1997). Physical growth parameters in thalassemic children. Indian journal of pediatrics, 64(6), 861–871. https://doi.org/10.1007/BF02725513
- George, A., Roach, E. J., & Andrade, M. (2011). Nursing education: opportunities and challenges. The Nursing journal of India, 102(6), 136–139.
- Renjith, V., Pai, M. S., Castelino, F., George, A., & Pai, A. (2016). Engel's Model as a Conceptual Framework in Nursing Research: Well-being and Disability of Patients With Migraine. Holistic nursing practice, 30(2), 96–101. https://doi.org/10.1097/HNP.0000000000000136
- Kumar, S., Adiga, K. R., & George, A. (2014). Impact of Mindfulness-based Stress Reduction (MBSR) on Depression among Elderly Residing in Residential Homes. The Nursing journal of India, 105(6), 248–251.

Dr Anice George has authored a book Yoga Therapy for Dysmenorrhea, which was published on 14 September 2016.
