= Refugee health =

Health effects experienced by people who have been displaced

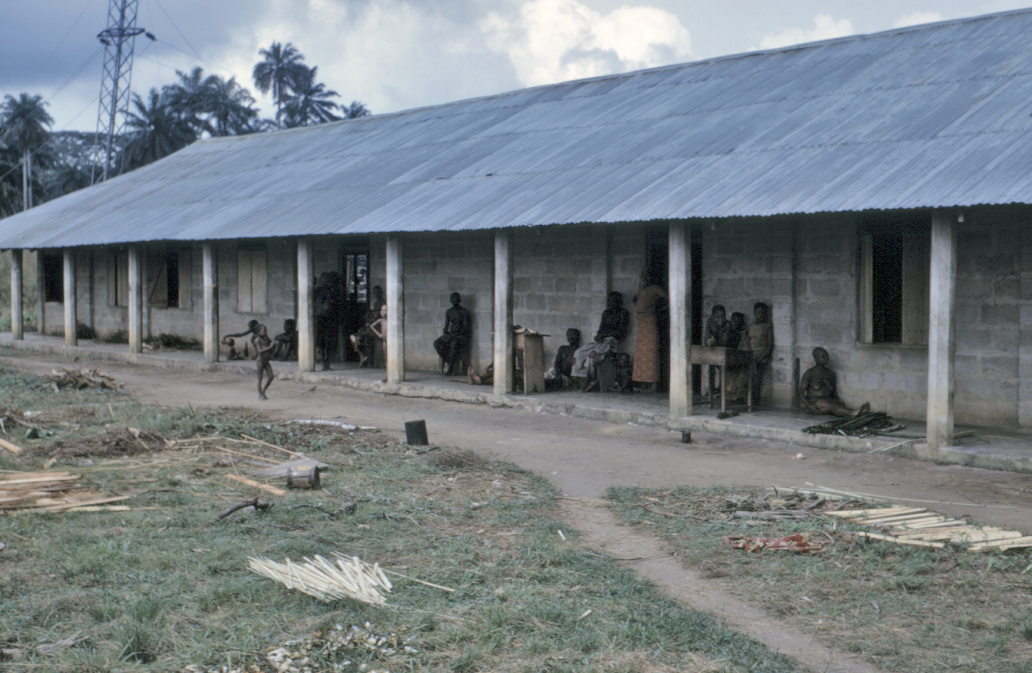
A hospital in a camp for refugees of the Nigerian-Biagfran Civil War, late 1960s (CDC)

Refugee health is the field of study on the health effects experienced by people who have been displaced into another country or even to another part of the world, as a result of unsafe circumstances such as war or persecution. People who have been displaced can be affected by infectious diseases or some chronic diseases that are uncommon in the country in which they eventually settle. Mental health is an important consideration and can greatly impact people who are displaced. The health status of refugee's can be tied to factors such as the person who migrated's geographic origin, conditions of refugee camps or urban settings where they lived, and personal, physical, and psychological conditions of the person, either pre-existing or acquired while traveling from their homeland to a camp or eventually to their new home.

== Major health concerns ==
In general, people who come from other countries to more wealthier or developed countries are less likely to use general health services but are at greater risk of poor mental health and dying prematurely compared with native populations. People who are refugees are at a higher risk for contracting certain diseases or having other health problems due to factors such as poor nutrition, poor sanitation and lack of adequate medical care.

=== Non-communicable diseases ===
A non-communicable disease is a medical condition that is not transmissible and not infectious. It is caused by individual and environmental behaviors. According to the WHO, these diseases lead to an estimated 40 million deaths per year, 70% of deaths worldwide. Development and control of these conditions is directly linked with nutrition and healthy behaviors. Non-communicable diseases have accounted for 19-46% of mortality from the top five refugee-producing countries in 2015. Reports indicate that more than half of Syrian refugee households (resettled in Lebanon) have a member suffering from a non-communicable disease.

==== Diabetes ====
Diabetes is a group of chronic metabolic diseases that affect the body's use of blood sugar. There are two main forms of diabetes: type 1 and type 2. Type 1 diabetes is characterized by insulin deficiency and requires daily administered doses of insulin. Causes of Type 1 diabetes are unknown and are currently, not preventable. It is typically onset at an early age. Type 2 diabetes is characterized by the body's inability to properly utilize insulin. Type 2 diabetes is typically onset in adults and is linked with unhealthy behaviors. Another common form of diabetes is gestational diabetes. This occurs in pregnant women and does not necessarily lead to Type 1 or Type 2 diabetes permanently.

Refugees are at an increased risk of developing diabetes because of the tendency towards inadequate nutritional behaviors. According to the CDC, amongst Syrian refugees, there is a 6.1% prevalence of adult-onset diabetes. Iraqi refugees saw a 3% prevalence and Congolese refugees faced less than 1%. A literary analysis on diabetes risk amongst refugee populations suggests that increased diabetes risk among adult refugees may be associated with longer migration histories. The analysis also links increased diabetes prevalence with the transition from traditional, agricultural lifestyles with potentially protective foods, to urbanized, westernized lifestyles that come with migration.

==== Anemia ====
Anemia is a condition in which an individual does not have enough healthy red blood cells. This will consequently lead to reduced oxygen flow to the body's organs. Most commonly, this is caused by not consuming enough iron. Anemia is used as a marker for overall micronutrient deficiency. Symptoms usually involve overall fatigue and tiredness, as a result of reduced oxygen flow. There are various treatments for anemia, including iron supplements and vitamin B supplements. Blood transfusions may also be used if blood production is low.

According to the CDC, "an evaluation of anemia prevalence in the Zaatari refugee camp and surrounding areas showed that 48.4% of children younger than 5 years of age, and 44.8% of women 15-49 years of age suffered from anemia". Amongst Congolese refugees, Sickle Cell Anemia (SCD) is of a much larger concern. In Central America, refugees coming from El Salvador, Guatemala, and Honduras show the highest incidence of anemia cases. The CDC reports that the prevalence for children under 5 years old is 30% in El Salvador, 47% in Guatemala, and 40% in Honduras. In Guatemala, 22% of pregnant women are also anemic. These cases are mostly credited to poor nutrition or a chronic parasitic infection.

==== Cardiovascular disease and hypertension ====
Cardiovascular disease is a general term for various heart conditions such as coronary artery disease, cardiac arrest, arrhythmias, and many more. Hypertension is high blood pressure—this is usually defined as blood pressure over 130/80. Cardiovascular disease and hypertension are associated with poor nutrition/diet, sedentary lifestyles, and genetic risk factors.

Amongst Syrian refugees, 4.1% of adults suffered from cardiovascular disease and 10.7% suffered from hypertension. There is also substantial risk amongst Congolese refugees. According to the CDC, amongst Iraqi refugees in Jordan, 33% of those over 15 years of age had hypertension. Another 42% were pre-hypertensive. Bhutanese refugee adults had a 3% prevalence of hypertension, and nearly 1% prevalence of chronic obstructive pulmonary disorder.

=== Communicable diseases ===
==== Tuberculosis ====
Tuberculosis (TB) is a bacterial infection that mainly affects the lungs. As an airborne disease, TB is spread via inhalation of the bacteria, which subsequently travel to the lungs and other body parts to manifest infection. Once a person is infected, TB can either become latent or active. If latent, the disease is asymptomatic and non-contagious; however, latent TB can become active at any point. Active TB is symptomatic and contagious. Either way, TB should be treated immediately, as untreated infections can be fatal.

An estimated third of the world's population is infected with Mycobacterium tuberculosis. This high incidence necessitates that those conducting the overseas exam (Panel Physicians) screen all refugees for TB and further test anyone suspected of having active TB. Screening for tuberculosis generally involves a tuberculin skin test, followed by a chest X-ray when necessary, and laboratory testing depending on those results. Anyone between the ages of 2 and 14, living in a country with a tuberculosis incidence rate of 20 or more cases per 100,000 people (as identified by the WHO), is required to have a tuberculin skin test. Those aged 15 and older must have a chest x-ray.

In the US, refugee individuals identified as having active tuberculosis must complete treatment before being permitted to enter. Upon arriving in the US, the CDC recommends that all refugees be screened for tuberculosis using a tuberculin skin test. A follow-up chest x-ray is required if the tuberculin skin test is positive, or if the refugee was identified as having TB (either Class A or Class B) in their overseas exam, or if they are infected with HIV.

Over 2 billion people are infected with TB worldwide. Specifically amongst refugee populations, the risk of contracting TB are higher than in the general population, as overcrowding and international travel is higher and more frequent. According to the WHO, as of 2016, the TB incidence rate in Syria is 17 per 100,000 people. Compare this to 3.1 per 100,000 people in the United States.

==== Infectious hepatitis ====
There are multiple types of hepatitis, which most broadly can be described as viral infections of the liver. The most common types are viral hepatitis A, B, and C. Hepatitis B and C can result in chronic infections, while Hepatitis A is solely infectious. As such, Hepatitis A is also referred to as Infectious Hepatitis, and is caused by the Hepatitis A Virus (HAV). HAV can be spread directly or indirectly via fecal contact, causal contact, sexual contact, and foodborne or waterborne pathways. Because of this, refugee populations are more susceptible to this infection. According to a 2016 study conducted in Greece, the rate of Infectious Hepatitis amongst Syrian refugees in certain Greek facilities is 152 per 1,000 people; rates in refugees from Afghanistan and Iraq were much lower, at 8 per 1,000 and 9 per 1,000 people, respectively. The disproportionately higher rate in Syrian refugees can be attributed to the higher proportion of Syrian refugees in the camps, as compared to refugees from other countries of origin. There is no treatment for HAV infections, so hygienic intervention measures and vaccinations are of the highest priority in preventative measures. However, health care is often not prioritized in refugee populations and resources are limited, thus making it difficult to properly control the rate and spread of infection.

==== Hepatitis B ====
Hepatitis B infection is endemic in Africa, Southeast Asia, East Asia, Northern Asia, and most of the Pacific Islands. According to the CDC, the rate of chronic infection among persons emigrating to the US from these areas is between 5% and 15%. Many states require or recommend that all refugees be screened for hepatitis B, and proceed with immunizations for all who are susceptible to this infection. In regions where the Hepatitis vaccine is not regulated, new infections occur predominately among infant and young children. As a result, 25% of people who become chronically infected as infants and 15% of people who become chronically infected at an older age die of Hepatitis B related health conditions.

==== Sexually transmitted infections ====
Refugees can be at a higher risk for contracting sexually transmitted infections because of a lack of access to protection and/or treatment, as well as the circumstances of war and flight, making them subject to higher incidences of rape and sexual abuse. Refugees are regularly screened for syphilis, gonorrhea, chlamydia, and HIV infection when they relocate.

==== COVID-19 ====
As the COVID-19 pandemic advances across the world, refugees are among the most vulnerable populations. Coronavirus disease 2019 is a highly-contagious respiratory and vascular disease, caused by Severe acute respiratory syndrome coronavirus 2 (SARS-CoV-2). Due to social and economic conditions, resettled refugees face many of the same challenges that lead to poorer health for some racial and ethnic minority groups in the United States and in other countries. Refugees also face the challenges of a new healthcare system and finding health information they can understand. The density in population of refugee camps, in addition to lack of clean water, social distancing, and sanitation may impact exposure to COVID-19.

=== Parasitic infections ===
Intestinal parasites are a major health problem for many groups, including refugees, and the presence of pathogenic parasites requires medical attention. "Over one billion persons worldwide are estimated to be carriers of Ascaris. Approximately 480 million people are infected with Entamoeba histolytica. At least 500 million carry Trichuris. At present, 200 to 300 million people are infected with one or more of the Schistosoma species and it is estimated that more than 20 million persons throughout the world are infected with Hymenolepis nana". Consequences of parasitic infection can include anemia due to blood loss and iron deficiency, malnutrition, growth retardation, invasive disease, and death. Refugees are particularly at risk given the likelihood of poor or contaminated water and poor hygienic conditions in camps. Since 1999, the CDC has recommended that US-bound refugee populations from Africa and Southeast Asia undergo presumptive treatment for parasitic infections prior to departure. The US Protocol includes a single dose of albendazole. In many states, the domestic health screening exam recommends that all refugees be screened for parasitic infections whether or not they appear symptomatic. Screening often includes two stool specimens obtained more than 24 hours apart and/or a CBC with differential for evaluation of eosinophilia.

==== Malaria ====
Malaria is considered endemic in the Americas from as far north as Mexico to as far south as Argentina, in Africa from Egypt to South Africa, in Asia from Turkey to Indonesia, and in the islands of Oceania. It is estimated that 300 to 500 million people are infected each year with malaria, and over one million people die every year from the disease, predominantly in sub-Saharan Africa. Based on the high prevalence of asymptomatic malaria in sub-Saharan Africa, the CDC recommends that US-bound refugee populations from this region undergo presumptive treatment prior to departure to the US. For those refugee arrivals from sub-Saharan Africa with no pre-departure treatment documentation, the CDC recommends either they receive presumptive treatment on arrival (preferred) or have laboratory screening to detect Plasmodium infection. For refugees from other areas of the world where asymptomatic malaria is not prevalent, the CDC recommends that any refugee with signs or symptoms of malaria should receive diagnostic testing for Plasmodium, and subsequent treatment for confirmed infections, but not presumptive treatment.

==== Giardiasis ====
Giardiasis is an intestinal parasitic infection, where the protozoa is in its flagellate mode of movement. It is most commonly spread through contaminated water and food in developing countries. Symptoms are rather mild, and include abdominal pain, flatulence, and loose stool. Studies have found that Giardiasis is common amongst refugee populations, specifically those coming from Afghanistan. However, the parasite is not particularly adept at sustaining infection within children.

==== Leishmaniasis ====
Leishmaniasis is another parasitic infection with a high burden of disease amongst refugee populations. It is a vector-borne parasite, commonly spread by the bite of an infected sand flies. There are two common types of manifestation: cutaneous (skin lesions) and visceral leishmaniasis (infection of internal organs). In 2012, there was an outbreak of Leishmaniasis amongst Syrians. Leishmaniasis is of major concern in the eastern Mediterranean, which is home to the majority of the globe's prevalence (≈57%). Leishmaniasis is most common in this region, as well as in Afghanistan, Iraq, and the Syrian Arab Republic. Thus, refugees coming from these regions, which is the majority of all refugees, are highly susceptible to becoming infected by this parasite. Additionally, refugees from other countries are put at a high risk of contraction, as they often share temporary settlements with refugees from Syria, Afghanistan, and Iraq. As a preventative measure, refugees are administered, when available, albendazole and ivermectin prior to their asylum seeking journey to other countries like the United States. Upon arrival, refugees are typically screened for these infections in order to prevent spread and fatality.

==== Scabies ====
Scabies is a contagious parasitic skin condition caused by the mite Sarcoptes scabiei. It spreads mostly through direct skin-to-skin contact, but can also be passed on through items like bedding and clothing. Scabies has been one of the most frequently observed medical conditions in refugee camps, including in Europe. For example, in Germany, it was the third most frequent disease outbreak reported in shelters for asylum seekers. In the Calais "Jungle" camp in France, the organization Doctors of the World UK estimated that up to 40% of people they treated had scabies. Health care staff working in camps across Europe reported barriers to scabies control included: (1) Lack of water and hygiene facilities – People may not have enough access to showers to properly remove treatment creams, or the ability to wash clothes and bedding, which can lead to reinfection. (2) Social issues – Language barriers, the stigma around the condition, and the constant movement of people make it hard to track and treat cases effectively. (3) Healthcare limitations – There are often shortages of medicines to treat scabies, a lack of private spaces for medical exams, and staff who may not be trained to recognize or manage the condition. (4) Organisational problems – Overcrowding, poor coordination between aid groups, and lack of support or even obstruction from authorities can make matters worse. To better control scabies outbreaks in these settings, it has been recommend using clear diagnostic guidelines and treating large groups of people at once with oral medication like ivermectin.

=== Mental health ===
As mental illnesses are not necessarily tangible or easily quantifiable, it is easy to disregard the real ramifications that poor mental health can have on a person. These repercussions can materialize in any aspect of a person's life, whether that be physical, social, financial, etc. Further, the manifestations of poor mental health are deeply rooted when trauma is experienced at a young age. Thus, populations vulnerable to traumatic experiences are at a concerningly high risk of mental illnesses and poor mental health.

Prior to World War II, immigrants were mainly driven from their countries by forces such as unemployment, famine and poverty, often combined with various forms of prejudice and oppression whilst war and ethnopolitical conflict were less common causes for emigration. They have known social oppression, including inadequate education, lack of job opportunities, inability to practice their faith or marry whom they wished, and inability to live where they want. Beginning with World War II, however, civilians were increasingly targeted as a strategy of warfare, and since then most newcomers (especially refugees) have been victims of war and/or political repression. Many of them have also experienced or witnessed government-sponsored torture and/or terror. That said, refugees are often survivors who possess amazing resiliency, strength and resourcefulness. An assessment of mental health may be included in a refugee's domestic health screening.

Refugee mental health and integration into a new society are exquisitely interwoven. Traumatic experiences that occurred in the home country or during the resulting flight from that country are common. These experiences, in addition to the stresses of resettling in the host country, increase the chances of a less successful adjustment to the society of the host country. Mental health problems are one of the key barriers to the labor market integration of refugees in host societies. The influence of these traumatic and stressful events may be temporary and manageable with straightforward solutions or may be disabling and enduring.

High rates of mental health concerns have been documented in various refugee populations. Most studies reveal high rates of post-traumatic stress disorder (PTSD), anxiety, depression, and somatization among newly arrived refugees. Variations reported in the prevalence of PTSD and depression may be ascribed to a number of factors, including prior life in their homeland, the experience of flight from that homeland, life in refugee camps, and stressors during and after resettlement in a third country. More specifically, socioeconomic status, educational background, and gender all affect levels of mental illness. A 2005 Lancet review found that 9% (99% CI 8–10%) of refugees in western countries had post-traumatic stress disorder and 5% (4–6%) had major depression In 2015, a study focused on the impacts of traumatic events on displaced persons from Syria, Lebanon, Turkey, and Jordan. It revealed that 54% of the population studied suffered from a severe emotional disorder. Of the children who participated in the study, 44% revealed depressive symptoms, and 45% showed signs of PTSD. Compared to other children around the globe, these statistics show a 10-fold increase in mental health disorders. Similarly to topics surrounding menstrual health, mental health is considered to be another taboo topic amongst certain cultures. This prevents people from seeking psychiatric help. Currently, there is only one functioning mental health hospital in Syria that tends to psychiatric needs. In 2016, a Syrian-American doctor named M.K. Hamza coined a new term to more accurately describe the effects felt by nearly all refugees affected by the ongoing crisis—human devastation syndrome. There is a severe lack of, and a dire need for, mental health attention and care. These traumatic events typically worsen and amplify progressively in the years following.

Refugees do not access mental health services even when resettled in developed countries, with one study finding that refugees are less likely to utilise mental health services than the national population except for a few specific conditions such as PTSD Hence, it is critical that mental health issues be addressed in the screening process. Leaving behind all that is familiar and starting a new life in a new country with a different language and culture in addition to previous trauma and dislocation produces an immediate challenge that can have long-term effects. This is true whether an individual is coming from Europe, sub-Saharan Africa, Central America, or elsewhere in the world. Many refugees will not share a Western perspective or vocabulary, so questions will need to be explained through specific examples or re-framed in culturally congruent terms with the assistance of an interpreter or bicultural worker. One option is to administer an efficient and valid screener for emotional distress, such as the Refugee Health Screener - 15, in the context of the overall health screening.

Methods of treatment for refugees with mental health issues must also be culturally congruent. Western psychiatric methods may not applicable to individuals who do not conceive of the body and mind in the same way as people in the United States. For example, studies of Tibetan refugees have shown how important the Tibetan religion of Buddhism is in helping the refugees cope with their situation. The religion provides them with an explanation for their situation and hope for a better future. In some cases, indigenous methods of coping and psychological therapy can be integrated with Western methods of therapy to provide a wide spectrum of mental help to refugees.

The evidence supporting different interventions to try and improve symptoms of post traumatic stress disorder in and other trauma related to their symptoms in refugees, asylum seekers, and people who are dislaced within their own country is weak. It is not clear if interventions that are based in the person's new community that are aimed to help children and adolescents are effective and should be implemented.

Additionally, refugee children face unique barriers to adequate psychological health support due to significant trauma during their vulnerable developmental years.

=== Women's health ===
Every woman from every country experiences her own menstrual process. However, some countries are more adept than others at providing proper resources and accessibility for women to easily maintain good hygiene. Menstrual health requires constant and proper upkeep in order to avoid subsequent infections. Menstruation requires attentive care and proper hygienic supplies. Thus, it is no wonder that while in the high income countries, menstrual health is not a major public health concern, but in developing countries or in times of crises, menstruation can pose a distinct problem for women in vulnerable populations.

Proper menstrual care includes washing oneself with soap on a daily basis, and changing menstrual supplies (such as pads or tampons) multiple times per day. Improper care can cause progressive infections, such as bacterial vaginosis (BV) or reproductive tract infection (RTI). With limited access to clean, running water and hygienic supplies (soap, pads, tampons) within refugee camps, monthly periods create health problems for women and girls.

As such, studies have been conducted in various refugee camps to assess the degree of burden that menstruation has on women. Refugees staying in temporary settlements in Myanmar reported poor latrine conditions, describing them as unsafe and dirty, with locks on the doors being a rare occurrence. Additionally, many young girls reported dark, unlit paths at nighttime causing unwarranted assaults by intruders in the camps. Thus, girls reportedly would not use the bathroom once it was dark outside, even if in need of a shower or a fresh pad.

Another obstacle that refugee women face in maintaining their menstrual health is limited to no access to an adequate amount of sanitary supplies. Many refugees do not have the luxury of changing their pads every few hours per day, so a buildup of bacteria is common. Other studies have revealed that when desperate, women will resort to using leaves or old pads to absorb the discharged blood, according to a report by Sommer's team in the journal Conflict and Health.

In addition to limited supplies and sanitary facilities, cultural attitudes towards menstruation create a difficult, taboo environment surrounding the topic. Thus, women and girls may feel too uncomfortable to seek help or advice on tending to their personal needs.

=== Occupational health ===
Demand for labor is an important reason for migration. Despite the difficulty in researching immigrant populations, there is evidence that occupational health is an area in which immigrants face disparities. Many migrant or foreign-born workers fill low-wage, temporary or seasonal work in industries and jobs that may pose greater risks for worker health and safety such as agriculture, construction and services. In the United States, agriculture sector occupational risks such as asthma are more likely to affect immigrant workers. For refugee health in the United States, clinic structure and hours often overlap with working hours and require long waiting times that exceed what refugees can set aside, which can serve as a structural barrier to healthcare. Overall, immigrants have higher rates of occupational morbidity and mortality than those who are native born, including higher rates of fatal and non-fatal injury. Evidence from Southern Europe points to higher rates of occupational risks such as working many hours per day and extreme temperatures and greater exposure to poor employment conditions and job precariousness. Health prevention and training programs related to occupational safety and health may not reach immigrants due to language, cultural and/or economic barriers. However, interventions tailored to their needs have been shown to be effective. Developing partnerships with institutions in the immigrant communities is one way of improving access to information and resources to immigrant workers. Improving work conditions can also improve other aspects of immigrant health however the work is often underutilized in efforts to promote migrant health. An emerging occupational health issue for immigrants relates to the health risks faced by people who are trafficked into situations of forced labor and debt bondage.

== Interventions ==
=== Health literacy ===
Health literacy is a crucial component to preventative healthcare and improved public health. A cross-sectional study conducted amongst refugees in Sweden, found that 60% of those assessed had inadequate functioning health literacy and 27% of them had inadequate comprehensive health literacy. The study concluded that health literacy should be taken into consideration when assessing refugee health and that more research is needed to assess the current dynamics and develop strategies to overcome the gaps in health literacy amongst refugees. Through the provision of targeted, adequate health literacy tool kits, populations are more likely to adhere to treatment plans and prevention efforts—particularly in the realm of infectious disease. These health literacy tools must be relevant to the communities, administered in familiar language and vocabulary, and must truly take into account the competencies and limitations of the target audience. Within health literacy initiatives, collaborative learning and social support could contribute to people's understanding and ability to judge, sift and use health information. Consequently, adding these practices to the definition of critical health literacy could prove to be hugely beneficial to patient communities.

=== Civic orientation ===
In some countries, e.g. EU and OECD countries, information about the host society is offered to refugee migrants in connection with applying for or obtaining a residence permit. Civic orientation usually include information about the country's history, political system, laws, health, culture and everyday life. Most countries combine the civic orientation with other introduction activities such as language courses. Civics and language courses are commonly test based, meaning that a pass grade is required to obtain a residency or citizenship status.

=== Non-communicable diseases ===
When addressing the needs of NCD patients within humanitarian crises, there needs to be a more epidemiological approach to assessing prevalence of NCDs to ensure a better understanding of the local needs and risks. After such assessment is made, those new understandings must be targeted to create novel, innovative approaches to mitigate risks and promote healthy behaviors—in an infectious manner. Finally, in order to adequately provide such resources, there must be strong guidance and education continuously available.

=== Immunizations ===
Refugees arrive in their new countries with a variety of immunization needs. While refugees may have had vaccinations in their country of origin, often they lack documentation because they were forced to depart their home country in haste. Some may have received immunizations as part of their overseas exam, and some may have received no immunizations. Recommendations by the World Health Organization's (WHO) Expanded Program on Immunizations (EPI) are generally followed by countries worldwide with minor variations in vaccine schedules, spacing of vaccine doses, and documentation. The majority of vaccines used worldwide are from reliable local or international manufacturers, and no potency problems have been detected, with the occasional exception of tetanus toxoid and the oral polio vaccine (OPV).

In the United States, entering refugees are not required to have vaccinations. However, it is mandated that at the time of applying for adjustment of status from legal temporary resident to legal permanent resident, a refugee must be fully vaccinated in accordance with recommendations of the Advisory Committee on Immunization Practices (ACIP). A list of required vaccines in the US can be found on the vaccine schedule page.

=== Social support ===
Social support can be very helpful in preventing mental health issues and for coping with living in a new land, so refugees from the same areas should be able to live close to each other. However, even in this case, it may be necessary for social support to be offered by statutory or voluntary agencies from outside the refugees' and asylum seekers' communities in line with local informal and formal structures and networks. One model for such support was proposed by British authors in 2014, the WAMBA process, in which five essential components of support for refugees and asylum seekers were identified:

- Welcome: a person-centred and benign enquiry as to the asylum seeker's history in a friendly setting and with the use of interpreters if necessary.
- Accompaniment: the availability of social support in an asylum-seeking client's life (amongst other presences such as an exilic community and intimate attachments) may foster assurance that moments of crisis can be negotiated by asylum seeker and support worker together.
- Mediation: offering a type of humanitarian solidarity and care which will offset some of the negative consequences of the asylum-seeking process and the hegemonic order which it represents and mediating between the individual asylum seeker and the systemic constraints of the asylum process.
- Befriending: Befriending is another side to the relationship of accompaniment and which seeks to mitigate the political reality within which asylum seekers find themselves and which is distinctly unfriendly: tightly controlled, suspicious, rebarbative and highly hostile.
- Advocacy: The professional helping relationship between worker and client can potentially diminish the isolation brought about by the circumstances within which some asylum seekers may live by giving time to hear the voice of the individual and providing support that attends to the individual's needs.

=== COVID-19 response ===
Disease surveillance in refugee camps was already a major part of outbreak response. Contact tracing in refugee camps has become especially important to minimize COVID-19 transmission. In places like Cox's Bazar, the largest refugee settlement in the world, the World Health Organization now tests over 500 samples for COVID-19 a day. Just like any other healthcare facility, infection prevention and control measures are now especially important in refugee health centers. These measures contribute to the prevention of COVID-19 transmission in refugee camps.

But unlike the rest of the world, measures like physical distancing are difficult in refugee camps. Most refugee camps are more densely populated than the Diamond Princess, a cruise ship where an outbreak of COVID-19 led to transmission four times faster than in Wuhan. Additionally, low literacy levels make distribution of health and safety information difficult. In some refugee camps, the UNHCR is addressing these challenges using Community Outreach Members and recorded voice messages sent to mobile phones. Both of these platforms allow the communication of information about mask usage, contact tracing, and quarantine and isolation.

Ultimately, COVID-19 is affecting minorities and low income communities disproportionately. This is especially true for refugees. Evidence shows that an inclusive approach to COVID-19 response is required. Important factors for COVID-19 planning for refugees include creating sanitary and less crowded living conditions, as well as ensuring that refugees are not trapped by states of emergency and lockdowns.

== See also ==
- Refugee health in the United States
- Refugee health in Uganda
- Refugee health care in Canada
- Refugee children
