= Margaretta Craig =

American nurse and missionary (1902–1963)

Margaretta Craig OBE
- Born: 1902
- Died: 1963 (aged 60–61)
- Occupations: Nurse; Nurse Educator; Academic

Academic background
- Education: College of Wooster, Johns Hopkins School of Nursing, Columbia University

Academic work
- Discipline: Nursing
- Institutions: Rajkumari Amrit Kaur College of Nursing, University of Delhi, Christian Medical College, Ludhiana, Wanless Hospital, Miraj, Maharashtra

Margaretta Craig OBE (1902–1963) was an American nurse and a missionary of the Presbyterian Church who served as Principal of the School of Nursing Administration, New Delhi (1943–1946) and later as the Principal of College of Nursing, New Delhi (now Rajkumari Amrit Kaur College of Nursing), (1946–1958).

== Professional career ==
Craig left for India in 1930 and remained in India for the rest of her professional career. She joined Wanless Hospital, Miraj in western India in 1930 where she worked until she was called by the Government of India in 1943 to head the newly established School of Nursing Administration in New Delhi. She served as Principal of the School of Nursing Administration, New Delhi (1943-1946) and later as the Principal of College of Nursing (now Rajkumari Amrit Kaur College of Nursing), New Delhi (1946–1958).

After her retirement in 1958 from the College of Nursing, New Delhi (now Rajkumari Amrit Kaur College of Nursing), Margaretta Craig joined Christian Medical College, Ludhiana as Nursing Superintendent where she worked until her death in 1963. Ms. Craig was instrumental in establishing the Nursing School at Christian Medical College, Ludhiana.

== Awards and honours ==
- OBE (civil division) in January 1948
- Florence Nightingale Medal by International Committee of the Red Cross (ICRC) in 1955

== Legacy ==
- Margaretta Craig hostel in the main campus of Christian Medical College, Ludhiana is named after her.
- Margaretta Craig Scholarship is available for students of Rajkumari Amrit Kaur College of Nursing, New Delhi
- Margaretta Craig memorial prize instituted by The Trained Nurses' Association of India
