= Anice Ladd Whitney =

American labor journalist (1877–1950)

- Born: April 9, 1877; Rushville, New York, U.S.
- Died: May 5, 1950 (aged 73); Washington, D.C., U.S.
- Occupations: Writer, editor
- Employer: Bureau of Labor Statistics

Anice Ladd Whitney (April 9, 1877 – May 5, 1950) was an American writer and editor, focused on industrial safety and health issues. She was one of the first staff members of the Monthly Labor Review, when it began publication in 1915.

== Biography ==
Whitney was born in Rushville, New York, the daughter of Albert Darwin Whitney and Florence Cecilia Ladd Whitney. Her parents were educators. She graduated from Syracuse University's Conservatory of Music in 1899, with further studies in New York and Berlin.

Whitney taught music as a young woman, at Maryville College and privately. She was an original staff member of the Monthly Labor Review, a publication of the Bureau of Labor Statistics. She worked for the Bureau for more than thirty years. She was a member of the Daughters of the American Revolution and Kappa Alpha Theta.

Whitney lived in Washington D.C., where her older brother Mark Ladd Whitney was a patent examiner. She fell on a sidewalk in January 1950 and died from her injuries in May 1950, at the age of 73.

== Publications ==
- "Medical, Hospital, and Surgical Treatment for Employees" (1917)
- "Rest and Recreation Rooms and Rest Periods for Employees" (1917)
- "Clubs, Gymnasiums, and Recreation Grounds for Employees" (1917)
- "Lunch Rooms for Employees" (1917)
- "Administration and Costs of Industrial Betterment for Employees" (1918)
- "Communal Kitchens in European Countries" (1918)
- "Development of Shop Committee Systems" (1919)
- "Labor Unrest in Spain" (1921)
- "Labor Unrest in Japan" (1921)
- "Labor Unrest in Scandinavian Countries and Finland" (1921)
- "Health and Welfare Activities in the Government Printing Office" (1923)
- "Operation of Unemployment-Benefit Plans in the United States up to 1934" (1934)
- "Social Insurance in Latin America" (1939)
- "Wartime Methods of Dealing with Labor in Great Britain and the Dominions" (1942, with Margaret H. Schoenfeld)
