= Refugee health in the United States =

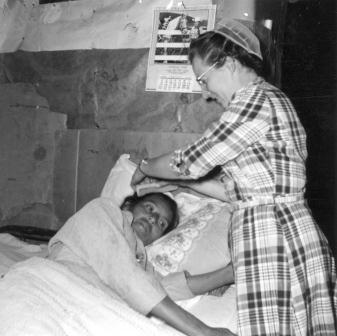
A nurse tends to a woman in an Arizona migrant camp, 1961.

Special considerations are needed to provide appropriate medical treatment for refugee migrants to the United States, who often face extreme adversity, violent and/or traumatic experiences, and travel through perilous regions. Such considerations include screenings for communicable diseases, vaccinations, posttraumatic stress disorder, and depression.

The United States has rigorous health screening guidelines for refugees and immigrants entering the country. The 1980 Federal Refugee Act enabled the US Public Health Service to facilitate health screenings for all immigrants and refugees before they depart their country of origin. The screening effort is overseen by the Office of Refugee Resettlement (ORR), housed in and funded by the U.S. Department of Health and Human Services (HHS).

Both in their countries of origin and after arriving in the U.S., refugees often face obstacles in accessing medical care. In their countries of origin, weak healthcare infrastructure and a scarcity of medical resources may prevent them from obtaining needed care prior to their departure. Often, that lack of adequate healthcare contributes to an increased likelihood of major diseases as compared to other immigrants. Upon arrival in the U.S., healthcare barriers including cognitive, structural, and financial barriers can limit access to timely, appropriate, and culturally competent care. Programs like video interpretation services, preventative care, and English language classes have been suggested to combat these barriers.

== Special health considerations for refugees ==
Because of the often hasty circumstances of their departures from their origin countries, refugees usually lose access to their medical records, and continuity of care is difficult to establish upon entry to the United States. In addition, the living conditions of resettlement or housing insecurity upon coming to the United States further impact refugees' health by inserting them into communities or situations where access to care is limited. This is a significant problem, especially for refugees with chronic and mental health conditions. Unlike most of the immigrant population, refugee health is of particular concern because the conditions of their immigration include experiences that may negatively impact their physical or mental health. Further, after arrival in the U.S., refugees may face obstacles to accessing care because of limited English proficiency and uncertainty of how to navigate the U.S. healthcare system. Once accessing care, ensuring that the treatment refugees receive is culturally appropriate may serve as another obstacle to maintaining a healthy life after resettlement.

There are various barriers to both accessing healthcare and achieving treatment or services that many refugees experience upon entering the country. In efforts to access care, having the correct documentation may make it difficult to qualify for care in the first place. With documentation, navigating the healthcare system and their health insurance policies can make obtaining treatment confusing and difficult. The US health insurance system is complicated - especially for refugees - in that they only receive 8 months of general care after resettlement and there are many different federal, private, and nonprofit organizations that are involved in this process. If individuals need any form of more specialized care, it is difficult to obtain.

Once gaining coverage, utilizing the available care introduces other obstacles. Language may serve as another complication, because if an individual is unable to communicate with their medical provider, receiving appropriate treatment is difficult. Having access to an interpreter and one that speaks the appropriate language is generally uncommon. Many find it difficult to have the money and the means of transportation to get coverage and treatment, as well. In the case of treatment, especially among individuals with chronic or mental health conditions, having care that is culturally appropriate can impact the refugee experience with healthcare too. Differences in cultural background and experience can mean that refugees may have different ideas about when to ask for care, assessing health concerns and associated treatment. As a result, many refugees are less inclined to access care because the United States healthcare model may not align with their cultural beliefs or values. In a 2017 study, a Somali woman's struggle to get pills that were Kosher in order to respect her religious beliefs is an example of how culturally appropriate care and treatment is a barrier to refugee individuals adequately being treated by the healthcare system.

With these barriers in mind, there are steps being taken to improve the process for acquiring care and promote a positive healthcare experience. For instance, there are individuals who act as "cultural brokers" to help refugees to access medical services, locate pharmacies, learn about their medications, and schedule follow-up treatment. Establishing communication between policymakers, frontline providers of refugee medical care, and refugees can allow for improvements in refugee health policy outcomes. Also, making sure that refugees receive continuing, thorough assessments of their mental and physical health, health promotion materials in their own language, and access to specialist services (especially in cases of torture or violence) can improve the standard of health among refugee populations. The main healthcare refugees receive is public insurance rather than private, and the majority of this healthcare is available immediately upon arrival and resettlement, but is harder to access later down the line.

=== Mental health ===
As of 1997, states are required to provide a comprehensive health screening for all newly arrived refugees in the United States, which includes a mental evaluation, as well as a physical examination. This approach has resulted in a significant number of mental health referrals and treatments, indicating a need for increased psychological support for newly arrived refugees. The most frequently diagnosed mental condition in refugee populations is post-traumatic stress disorder (PTSD), which is commonly a result of violence. Experts have found that drug therapy, through the use of serotonin uptake inhibitors, as well as cognitive therapy have been effective treatments during resettlement. However, there still exists a lack of culturally appropriate psychiatric care that prevents adequate treatment.

The mental health of refugees remains an issue long after their resettlement in the United States. Resettled clients commonly face stressors categorized into two main groups within the refugee population: Pre-migration stressors and Post-migration stressors. Pre-migration stressors typically involve potentially traumatic experiences in the individual's country of origin, often encompassing the compelling reasons for seeking asylum. On the other hand, Post-migration stressors comprise experiences and stressors within their host country. Refugees often experience further mental trauma after migrating due to hostility from native citizens, or even authorities at detention centers and ports of entry, which is further exacerbated by long wait times for asylum application decisions. This process generally takes anywhere from 18 months to well over two years. In a study of Cambodian refugees (one of the largest refugee groups in the United States), it was found that, despite the passage of more than two decades since the end of the Cambodian civil war and refugee resettlement in the US, members of the group continue to have high rates of psychiatric disorders associated with trauma. Within the Cambodian refugee group, higher rates of PTSD and major depression were associated with factors such as old age, having poor English-speaking proficiency, unemployment, being retired or disabled, and living in poverty. Researchers have identified a number of factors contributing to mental illness in refugee populations, including language barriers, family separation, hostility, social isolation, and trauma prior to migration. However, few doctors in the US are equipped to address these issues, and thus, there have been calls for a refugee-specific strategy for health care that ensures equal access to services for refugees, as well as universal training for physicians to handle refugee-specific conditions and circumstances. Several barriers prevent Western mental health protocols and categorizations from effectively evaluating and treating refugees. For example, bereavement and demoralization are often labeled as depression in Western mental health. Moreover, access to mental health resources is often time-limited for newly arrived refugees, which poses another challenge for health professionals attempting to deliver effective and culturally appropriate care, which takes into account the unique history and cultural diversity of the refugee population. Approaches in addressing specific mental health needs amongst resettled refugees have focused on trauma-informed frameworks with centered themes in "enabling safety, trust, choice, empowerment, and collaboration" While intentionally a holistic framework, trauma-informed care has been critiqued for its neoliberal constraints that often depoliticizes refugee experiences into individual medicalized needs. This is especially prevalent in relation to post-migration stressors, where the majority of trauma-informed focuses have targeted war exposure on mental health. Experts have also tied connections between post-migration stressors or "daily stressors" to exacerbated mental health challenges among refugee individuals. These critiques have brought to the rise of incorporating "trauma and violence informed" approaches to refugee mental health services that aim in acknowledging the sources of psychological stressors within structural, cultural, and systemic inequities. This includes acknowledging experiences of racism, colonization, and other systemic injustices.

According to a study in 2013, Latino (Mexican, Cuban, Puerto Rican, or Other) women were significantly affected by pre-migration measures (migration itself and unplanned migration) that resulted in higher levels of psychological distress, but not Latino men. The study also found that both men and women were more likely to report fair or poor physical health if they migrated to the United States in an unplanned manner.

=== Dental health ===
Poor oral health is the most common health-related issue among refugee children and is the second most common health issue among refugee adults. Poor oral health has a negative effect on quality of life and can increase the risk for chronic diseases through common risk factors mechanism Dental caries, or tooth decay puts refugee children at a higher risk for experiencing oral pain, abnormal eating patterns, slow weight gain, speech issues, and learning difficulties. Refugees from Hispanic and Asian origins are at the highest risk for dental caries, followed by those from African, Eastern European and Middle Eastern countries. Refugee children in the U.S. have been shown to have poorer oral health on average, due to many factors including country of origin, parent knowledge, inevitable diet change, access to traditional oral health tools from their home country, time spent in refugee camps, English language skills, and access to dental care once in the U.S. In the larger U.S. population, access to preventative and restorative dental services plays an important role in oral health status. Due to the complexity of these barriers, oral health problems are often diagnosed late and children receive little aftercare. Health access is influenced by factors such as limited literacy, socioeconomic status and insurance. There is limited evidence supporting current oral health interventions for refugee children in the United States, with lack of participation being a major barrier.

=== Lead poisoning ===
Lead poisoning is an important health issue for children all around the world. The prevalence of elevated blood lead levels (i.e., BLLs ≥ 10 μg/dL) among newly resettled refugee children is substantially higher than the 2.2% prevalence for US children. A 2001 Massachusetts study found as many as 27% of newly arrived refugee children with elevated BLLs, making refugees one of the highest risk groups. Refugees may be exposed to lead from a number of sources which can include: leaded gasoline, herbal remedies, cosmetics, spices that contain lead, cottage industries that use lead in an unsafe manner, and limited regulation of emissions from larger industries. The detrimental effects of lead on children may occur with no overt symptoms and blood lead testing is the only way to determine exposure or poisoning. Lead poisoning is typically treated by identifying the lead source, eliminating that source, and regularly receiving testing to ensure that blood lead levels are decreasing. For extremely high blood lead levels (i.e., BLLs ≥ 45 μg/dL), chelation therapy may recommended for refugee children. The CDC recommends lead testing for newly arrived refugee children younger than 16 years of age. Guidelines for testing vary among states, ranging from testing children younger than six years of age to the CDC age limits of testing those younger than 16 years of age.

=== Infant mortality ===
A study done in 2007 found that infants born to Mexican-immigrant women in the United States had a 10% lower mortality rate than infants born to non-Hispanic women in the United States. This research further support for the Hispanic paradox. Although Palestine refugee communities face socioeconomic hardship and have high fertility rates, their infant and childhood mortality rates are among the lowest in the Arab world. The causes of neonatal mortality among Palestine refugees are proportionally similar to those found in the most developed regions of the world. Non-communicable diseases are the leading causes of infant, and particularly neonatal deaths, among Palestine refugees, as they are among industrialized countries in Europe and North America.

Poor oral health has a negative effect on quality of life and can increase the risk for chronic diseases through common risk factors mechanism. Poor oral health has a negative effect on quality of life and can increase the risk for chronic diseases through common risk factors mechanism.

=== Diet ===
US refugees have elevated rates of chronic diseases, including obesity, diabetes, hypertension, malnutrition, and anemia, compared with US-born residents or first-generation immigrants. First, refugees encounter language barriers: they need time to acculturate to unfamiliar language and food environments in the United States. Second, refugee beliefs and home-country culture, in conjunction with postresettlement socioeconomic status (SES; which is often lower), influence what types of food can be purchased and consumed. Third, limited information about foods, shopping, and recipes in the United States creates another barrier to purchasing healthy foods. Fourth, high intake of processed and energy-dense foods in the United States contributes to chronic disease risk. A study that based its research on the New Immigrant Survey (NIS) found that Hispanic immigrants that have been in the United States the longest have experienced greater changes in their diet. Of these Hispanics with the greater change in their diet since moving to the U.S., the ones who have reported the worst health are the ones who have spent more time in the United States. Also, Hispanic immigrants who have spent the most time in the U.S. and reported worse health were also more likely to report the use of English language in their workplace. These findings demonstrate some correlation between Hispanic-immigrant health and their assimilation to American behavior in the United States. Another study reported that only 13% of refugees studied felt they ate generally healthy diets in the United States. They also reported difficulties locating preferred foods. Lack of healthy food options in the past shaped their dietary habits and food choices poorly after resettlement. For example, 32% of Bhutanese refugees had vitamin B-12 deficiencies, likely due to a scarcity of meat, eggs, and dairy in their Nepal diets.

=== Women's health ===
Refugee women have unique and challenging concerns in terms of accessing healthcare after resettlement in the United States. This includes reproductive and maternal health, mental health, and domestic violence. Culturally influenced gender roles may influence health concerns and access to treatment for female refugees, especially within the realm of reproductive, domestic violence, and psychological care. It can be difficult to obtain appropriate preventative or specialized care to treat these medical concerns with the limited healthcare options available to refugee women.

This is especially apparent in terms of reproductive healthcare, where there is a low number of women screened for cervical and breast cancer compared to the large women with reproductive health needs. These screenings, in addition to other preventative services like STD testing and birth control options are important ways to assess sexual health, but many women are not able to receive these services for cultural or systemic reasons and may develop more serious health conditions as a result. In addition to birth control, female refugees were less likely to access prenatal and maternal care than native-born or other immigrant US populations despite receiving equal coverage in the United States. While refugee mothers are less likely to access prenatal and maternal services due to social and economic barriers, they are often more susceptible to cesarean sections, low birth rates, and other health issues.

Mental health is another issue faced by many refugee women which may result from their experience in their home country and the process of migrating and settling in the US. In a study conducted by Chris Brown in 2010, the results highlight that language proficiency, economic stress, and maternal stress all impact the mental health of Vietnamese female refugees. They also point out that much of this stress can be associated with the traumatic experiences or the stress to adapt and conform to the new culture of the United States that these women have experienced. While many men, women, and children are exposed to traumatic situations, women are more likely to experience PTSD, anxiety and other mental health conditions as a result because they are more prone to inter-personal trauma such as family separation, domestic violence or rape.

Another health issue that affects refugee women disproportionately is sexual and gender-based violence. While men also experience sexual violence, women are an especially vulnerable population because of shifting gender roles and power dynamics as they flee their home country and migrate and resettle in a new place. Gender-based violence is prevalent in both the home country and the country of resettlement as an instrument of war, in resettlement camps, and in families and communities throughout the resettlement process. This sexual violence is also present for refugee women through the form of trafficking during migration from their home country. Refugee women are exposed to many forms of gender-based violence in addition to the experience of domestic violence, and attaining care can be difficult due to failure to report these issues because of cultural taboo or unstable home life and the lack of support and service related to domestic violence and receiving help as reported by the refugee women. In addition to personal and social barriers to reporting their experiences, refugee women simply do not have access to appropriate medical and psychological services needed for treatment, which continues to make them a vulnerable population after resettlement.

== Medical screening for entry to the United States ==
The Centers for Disease Control and Prevention provides two major categories of refugee health guidelines:

- The overseas medical screening guidelines provide panel physicians guidance on the overseas pre-departure presumptive treatments for malaria and intestinal parasites. These screenings are usually conducted days to weeks before the refugee departs from his or her country of asylum.
- The domestic medical screening guidelines are provided for state public health departments and medical providers in the United States who conduct the initial medical screening for refugees. These screenings are usually conducted 30–90 days post-arrival in the United States.

=== Overseas protective actions ===
Three medical interventions are either required or recommended in order to contain infectious diseases and reduce the medical burdens that may be associated with refugee resettlement. First is a mandatory overseas screening for all refugees and immigrants, then a recommended domestic screening for refugees, and finally a required medical component to the Adjustment of Status (Green Card) process.

These medical exams are performed by approximately 400 physicians (called Panel Physicians) selected by the US Department of State (DOS) consular officials. The CDC Division of Global Migration and Quarantine (DGMQ) provides technical instructions and guidance to the physicians conducting overseas exams. The screening is primarily aimed at detecting infectious diseases of public health concern. The overseas exam includes a medical history inquiry, physical exam, chest x-ray for persons older than 14 years of age (Southeast Asian refugees older than 2 years of age), and specific lab tests. Testing routinely includes screening for syphilis and HIV in people over 15 years of age.

==== Laws ====
The CDC's Division of Global Migration and Quarantine is responsible for providing the US Department of State and the United States Citizenship and Immigration Services (USCIS) with medical screening guidelines. The guidelines are developed in accordance with Section 212(a)(1)(A) of the Immigration and Nationality Act (INA), which outlines the reasons an alien is ineligible for a visa or admission to the United States, specifically based on health grounds. "The health-related grounds include those aliens who have a communicable disease of public health significance, who fail to present documentation of having received vaccination against vaccine-preventable diseases, who have or have had a physical or mental disorder with associated harmful behavior, and who are drug abusers or addicts." Medical conditions recognized in refugees are categorized as Class A or Class B and are described below. If a refugee is found to have an inadmissible health-related condition, a waiver is required for the applicant to come to the US.

==== Class conditions ====
The health-related grounds for the exclusion of refugees and immigrants set forth in the law are implemented by a regulation, "Medical Examination of Aliens" (42 CFR, Part 34). The regulation lists certain disorders that, if identified during the overseas medical examination, are grounds for exclusion (Class A condition) or represent such significant health problems (Class B condition) that they must be brought to the attention of consular authorities.

The purpose of the medical examination is to determine whether an alien has 1) a physical or mental disorder (including a communicable disease of public health significance or drug abuse/addiction) that renders him or her ineligible for admission or adjustment of status (Class A condition); or 2) a physical or mental disorder that, although not constituting a specific excludable condition, represents a departure from normal health or well-being that is significant enough to possibly interfere with the person's ability to care for themselves, or to attend school or work, or that may require extensive medical treatment or institutionalization in the future (Class B condition).

Class A conditions	Class B conditions
Conditions which preclude entry to the US, including communicable diseases of public health significance, mental illnesses associated with violent behavior, and drug addiction	Conditions identified as amounting to a substantial departure from normal well-being.
If a Class A condition is indicated, refugees must undergo treatment before they are eligible for entry to the U.S.	If a Class B condition is indicated, refugees will likely receive treatment prior to departure from their country of origin, as well as follow-up care upon arrival in the U.S.
Active or infectious tuberculosis; Untreated syphilis; Untreated chancroid; Untreated gonorrhea; Untreated granuloma inguinale; Untreated lymphogranuloma venereum; Human immunodeficiency virus (HIV); Hansen's disease (Leprosy); Addiction or abuse of a specific substance without harmful behavior and/or any physical or mental disorder with harmful behavior or history of such behavior, along with the likelihood that the behavior will recur	Inactive or noninfectious tuberculosis; Treated syphilis; Other sexually transmitted diseases; Pregnancy; Treated, tuberculoid, borderline or paucibacillary Hansen's disease; Sustained, full remission of abuse of specific substances (including amphetamines, cannabis, cocaine, hallucinogens, inhalants, opioids, phencyclidines, sedative hypnotics and anxiolytics) and/or any physical or mental disorder (excluding addiction or abuse of specific substances, but including other substance-related disorders) without harmful behavior or a history of such behavior considered unlikely to recur

=== Domestic preventative actions ===
When refugees enter the United States, they must enter through one of the authorized ports of entry that have Quarantine Stations. At these locations, US Public Health Service personnel review refugees' medical documents and perform limited inspections to look for obvious signs of illness. Through an electronic notification system maintained by the CDC, state health officials in the destination state are notified and sent copies of the overseas medical exam.

Upon arrival in the US, it is recommended that refugees complete a domestic health screening that seeks to reduce health-related barriers to successful resettlement and protect the health of the US population. Domestic health exams focus on infectious disease screening, but can also offer diagnosis and treatment for other health conditions identified. The parameters of the screening are based upon the 1995 Office of Refugee Resettlement Medical Screening Protocol, but new guidance is forthcoming.

==== Laws ====
The Refugee Act of 1980, which amended the Immigration and Nationality Act to establish a domestic refugee resettlement program, has outlined several public health activities with regards to refugee resettlement. First, all state or local health officials are to be notified of each refugee's arrival so that they can provide timely treatment for health conditions of public health significance identified overseas. The Director of ORR has the authority to make grants to state or local health agencies to help them meet the costs of providing medical screening and initial medical treatment to refugees. In this way, states can provide domestic health assessment services with federal refugee funding support. To qualify for this funding, the state health assessments need to be in accordance with ORR requirements and approved by the ORR director. It is recommended that a refugee receive a health screening within 90 days of entering the United States. The screening protocols are left to state health officials with the approval of ORR.

==== Domestic health assessment ====
A Medical Screening Protocol for Newly Arriving Refugees was developed by ORR in collaboration with CDC in 1995. Many states have added requirements in addition to the ORR protocol. DHHS is now drafting guidance for an expanded domestic protocol for screening refugees. The scope of the domestic health exam includes:

- Follow up (evaluation, treatment and/or referral) of Class A and B conditions identified during the overseas medical exam
- Identification of persons with communicable diseases of potential public health importance that were not identified during, or developed subsequent to the overseas exam
- Introduction of incoming refugees and eligible clients to the US healthcare system, and
- Identification of conditions that could present a barrier to self-sufficiency

=== Adjustment of status exam ===
Refugees are eligible to apply for adjustment of status after one year in the US. While most immigrants are required to have a full medical exam at the time of applying for adjustment of status, refugees are an exception. Refugees who arrived without a Class A condition only require vaccinations with their adjustment of status; the full medical examination is not required. A full medical exam is only required for refugees if a Class A condition existed prior to arrival in the US.

== Sample U.S. programs ==
Because each state is responsible for coordinating refugee health screenings, protocols vary by state. A sampling of information about various state Refugee Health Programs is listed below:

- Arizona (http://azdhs.gov/preparedness/epidemiology-disease-control/disease-integration-services/refugee-health/index.php)
- California (https://www.cdph.ca.gov/programs/Pages/RefugeeHealthProgram.aspx)
- Florida (http://www.doh.state.fl.us/disease_ctrl/refugee/index.html)
- Maryland (http://phpa.dhmh.maryland.gov/OIDPCS/OIH/Pages/Home.aspx)
- Minnesota (https://www.health.state.mn.us/refugee/)

== Healthcare barriers ==
Resettled refugee communities find themselves particularly vulnerable to healthcare barriers and are often unable to attain and sustain health and wellbeing for themselves and their families due to structural inequities, poor social determinants of health, and a lack of access to health care resources. According to a 2009 study by Morris et al., refugees face a higher risk of low birth weight, poor educational outcomes, and higher rates of chronic physical and mental illnesses compared to United States Citizens.

A 2012 study conducted by Kullgren et al. found that the most prevalent reasons for delayed and/or unmet healthcare for adults in the United States were lack of affordability and accommodation. For example, worries about cost and inability to make time due to work or other commitments serve as the most and second most prevalent reasons for inadequate adult healthcare. The study also found that non-financial barriers including those in accommodation, availability, accessibility, and acceptability create more delays in adult healthcare than barriers in affordability.

According to a 2011 paper by Carrillo et al., healthcare disparities between races and ethnic groups affect health status and access, and healthcare access barriers can play a role in understanding the reasons behind these disparities. The paper described how healthcare barrier models like the Health Care Access Barriers (HCAB) model provide a framework for analyzing, categorizing, and detailing the determinants of health status. The HCAB model categorizes measurable healthcare barriers into financial, structural, and cognitive groups. Researchers have used this model to analyze the root causes for refugee health barriers and aid in interventions. For example, a 2016 study conducted by researchers in Jordan found that the common perceived structural barriers for Syrian refugees in Jordan included long waiting times, extensive service procedures and long distances. According to the study, financial barriers consisted of high costs of medical service, medicine and transportation. Cognitive barriers consisted of lack of trust, discrimination, and knowledge of the location and structure of the health care systems. These barriers are also stated in refugee studies in the United States and other countries as well. The paper by Carrillo et al. also detailed other health care access models like the Anderson's Behavioral Model of Health Services Use and its variations which have also been used to model access barriers.

According to a health assessment report based in San Diego, the five most major perceived health care barriers consisted of language, transportation, lack of insurance, cultural barriers, and lack of knowledge of the U.S. healthcare system. A 2011 clinical review stated how those barriers apply to many of the three million refugees who have entered the United States over the past three decades. And in just the last decade, around 600,000 refugees have arrived in the United States. A 2018 patient-centered review stated that poor health care access before arrival, discrimination, and trauma have contributed to the increased likelihood of major health issues in refugees as compared to other immigrants. The 2011 study by Asgary and Segar, which involved interviews with asylum seekers and expert providers/representatives of advocacy organizations, proposed that all levels of the healthcare system from the refugees and providers to the policymakers should work together to address healthcare barriers. To do so, the paper suggested that governmental, non-governmental, medical and legal organizations all work together to provide accessible medical care for refugees. A Metropolitan Policy Program has suggested that the maintenance and formation of local, state, and nationwide health assistance should include health care access and language skills.

As a result of the COVID-19 pandemic, a survey conducted in 2021 found that refugee communities primarily composed of African and Southeast Asian were suffering disproportionately from the effects of the pandemic. Specifically, 76% reported difficulty paying for food, housing and healthcare, 70% reported lost income, and 58% indicated concern about paying bills. A later national study using the 2020-2022 Annual Survey of Refugees found that perceived discrimination was one of the strongest predictors of healthcare access barriers among refugee newcomers in the United States, with barriers varying across intersections of race and sex.

=== Cognitive barriers ===
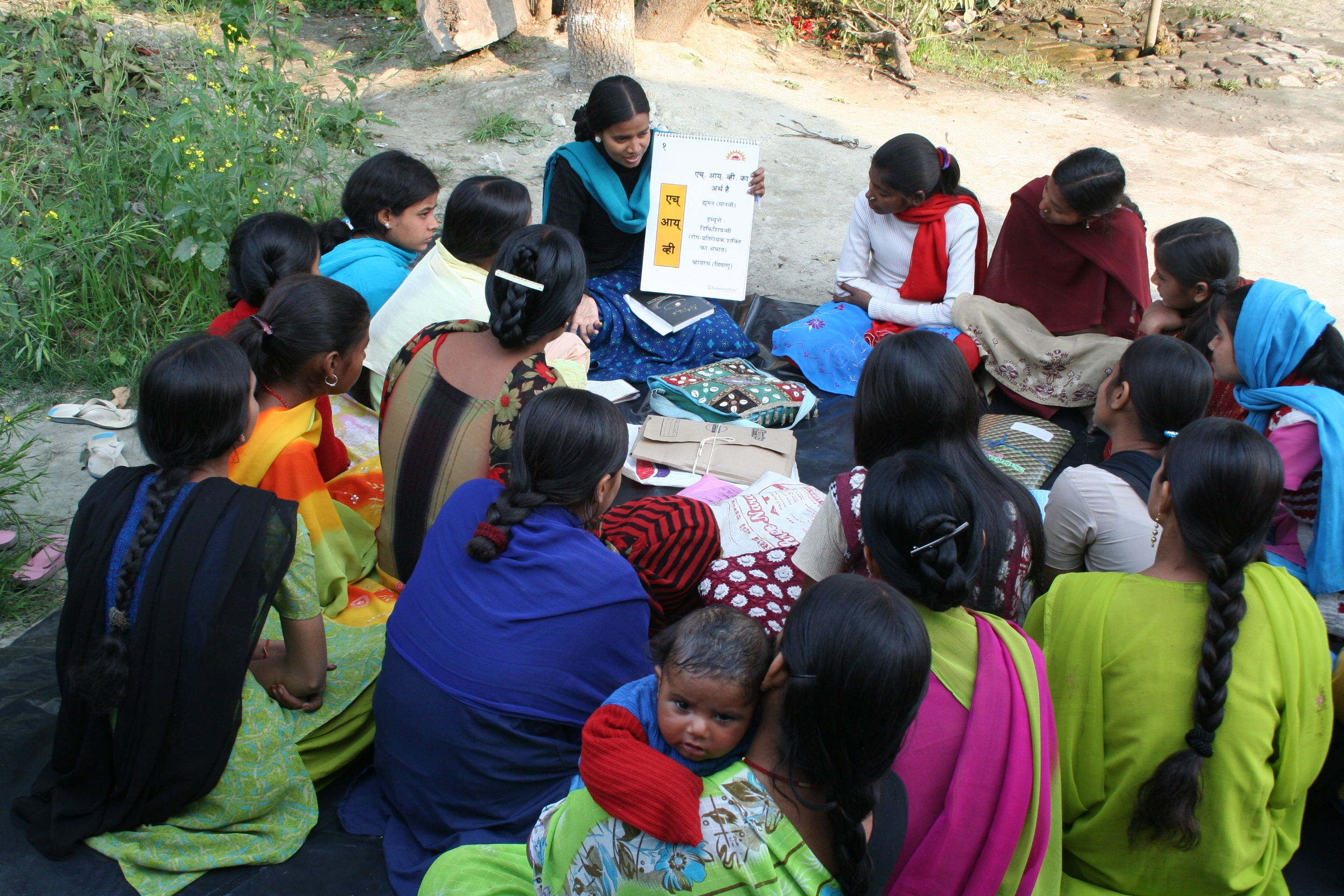
A woman teaches women's literacy class

Cognitive Barriers include but are not limited to insufficient knowledge, language, communication and health literacy. A 2009 study conducted by Morris et al. in California, found that unawareness of the cause and effect relationship between lifestyle choices, preventative actions, and health consequences can also lead to an unhealthy mentality towards health. Refugees unfamiliar to the culture and language of the United States face cognitive barriers at all levels of health care access. A 2019 review on healthcare challenges for refugees stated that communication is a prevalent issue. According to the review, adequate communication is needed to understand the reason for patient arrival, the underlying symptoms, the diagnosis, the future diagnostic tests required, and the prognosis and treatment plan. Results from a 2011 interview centered study has shown that linguistic and cultural cognitive barriers constitute the biggest hurdles in providing equitable care for refugees. The paper recommended an increase of professional interpreters and intercultural mediators into existing routines is recommended.

The 2019 review on refugee healthcare challenges also found that interpreter availability and quality can be directly associated with improved and increased health care use by refugees. The paper recommended professional interpreters for their knowledge on the healthcare system and health care vocabulary over using family and friends due to privacy reasons as well as biases that could impact patient decisions. The 2009 study by Morris et al. found that most refugees rely on family and friends for interpretation rather than professional services which can lead to misinterpretation issues. As a solution, refugee serving organizations have proposed that healthcare providers and clinics provide professional interpretation services. Both healthcare providers and refugee serving organizations face difficulties in establishing this service due to factors like cost and inconvenience. Other suggestions include AT&T language line services, improved interpretation quality, increased English language classes, and video interpretation services to name a few.

According to multiple studies on refugee language proficiency, language barriers can hinder appointment scheduling, prescription filling, and clear communications, and have been associated with health declines, which can be attributed to reduced compliance and delays in seeking care. Doctor patient interactions can become strained through the use of unfamiliar medical jargon. The Immigrant Access to Health and Human Services project states that the persistence of these cognitive barriers may be due in part to the lack of strong health care, social, and provider networks. It found that knowledge of services is primarily spread through word of mouth, so limited networks can constitute a significant barrier. A 2019 public health review found that the limited networks and lack of knowledge that refugees have on the U.S. healthcare system leave them with inequalities in healthcare access. Currently, it states that there are not many policies or practices aimed at overcoming these cognitive barriers for refugees. It recommends that communication strategies and services targeted at these inequalities should be put in place.

The United States does have federal legislation on Culturally and Linguistically Appropriate Standards (CLAS), which is legislation aimed at reducing healthcare inequities through culturally competent care. The 2011 study by Asgary and Segar stated that even with this legislation, many refugees are hesitant to access those resources for fear of being misunderstood or being unable to access quality interpretation services for their language. It also found that no legislative bodies hold hospitals up to the standards of CLAS, and the enforcement of laws relies on complaints.

The 2019 review on healthcare challenges for refugees and migrants found that health care and health literacy could be compromised without knowledge on the healthcare system.

=== Structural barriers ===
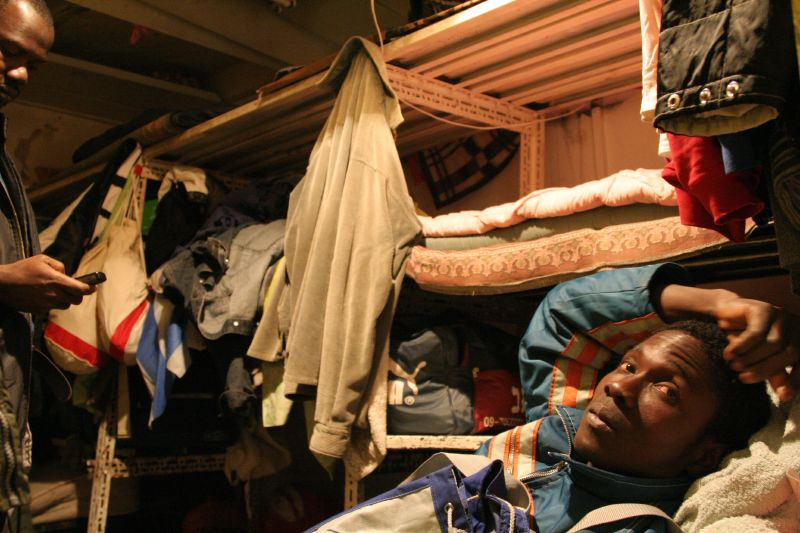
A refugee man sleeps on a shelf

A qualitative 2018 study by Sian et al. stated that structural barriers include transportation, geographical distance, waiting times, service availability, and general health infrastructure and organization. All of those barriers could physically hinder health access. A 2012 research brief found that structural barriers could also overlap with economic and cognitive barriers. For example, lack of interpretation services and the literacy to pass a drivers test would constitute as both structural and cognitive barriers.

The Immigrant Access to Health and Human Services project found that both rural and urban areas may lack adequate public transportation systems or be too expensive to navigate through taxis. According to the study conducted by Asgary and Segar, patients often do not have the time off work to access healthcare services. They found that refugees often prioritize employment, shelter and food over healthcare services. A book on nursing research states that clinic structure and hours constitute a structural barrier because they overlap with working hours and require long waiting times that exceed what refugees can set aside. The immigrant health project stated that providers are often unable to understand a refugee's specific experiences and style and language of communication. They suggest the inclusion of research based education for providers to better empathize with their patients.

Common characteristics of refugee communities include larger families living in crowded housing, low-paid front line workers in a variety of industries, limited English skills, poor access to and use of healthcare services, high degrees of financial and food insecurity, low rates of health insurance and high degrees of stress. Factors such as these exemplify the poor social determinants of health that may lead to adverse health outcomes in resettled refugee populations.

==== The Healthy Migrant Effect ====
The "healthy migrant effect" is a phenomenon wherein first-generation born immigrants arrive in the United States with an overall better quality of health than U.S. born citizens of the same racial or ethnic background. A longitudinal study conducted in 2001 by Singh et al. found that immigrant men and women had significantly lower risks of mortality than their U.S. born counterparts. A 2002 study that compared the hospital utilization records and mortality rates of foreign born and U.S. born New York residents discovered that immigrants were healthier and had longer life expectancies than U.S. born citizens. However, structural inequities faced by refugees such as lack of access to housing, employment, education, and healthcare eventually reduce the immigrant health advantage, leaving them with worse health outcomes than the general population.

=== Financial barriers ===
Resettled refugees face financial barriers to food, housing, and healthcare which can result in adverse health outcomes. Data has shown that approximately 21 percent of immigrant children in the U.S. live in poverty as opposed to 14 percent of native-born children. The low socioeconomic status of refugees is associated with numerous health risks such as malnutrition, smoking, injuries, unemployment, family dysfunction, psychosocial stress, and more.

A 2016 study on refugee insurance access stated that financial barriers for refugees made healthcare less accessible and affordable and could include differing state health insurance coverage policies, inadequate income, and insurance restrictions by employers. For the first eight months, most refugees have access to a health insurance called Refugee Medical Assistance (RMA). Other refugees may be eligible for more long term coverage through health insurance plans like Medicaid or the Children's Health Insurance Program, which last for several years. To allow refugees to look for cheaper health insurances, The Affordable Care Act created the Marketplace. According to the 2016 study, policies like the Patient Protection Act and Affordable Care Act have aimed at expanding health insurance coverage to refugees through the Medicaid program or health insurance marketplaces, but healthcare access differ between states because the states have implemented their health insurance programs differently. The paper suggests that the Department of Health and Human Services could provide subsidies to refugees seeking to purchase health exchanges, and during the screening process, federal agencies could also consider health status when resettling refugees and place them into states with more suitable health insurance policies.

Moreover, lack of insurance is associated with reduced access to healthcare and according to data from the National Survey of American Families, 22 percent of immigrant children are uninsured, more than twice the rate for U.S. born citizens.
